= 2026 United States House of Representatives elections in Texas =

- November 3, 2026

All 38 Texas seats to the United States House of Representatives
	Majority party	Minority party
Party	Republican	Democratic
Last election	25	13
Seats won	24	14
Seat change	▼1	▲1
Popular vote	4,590,522	5,145,910
Percentage	46.94%	52.62%
Swing	▼11.47%	▲12.23%
Republican
50–60%
60–70%
Democratic
50–60%
60–70%
70–80%
80–90%
Democratic
Hold
Gain
Republican
Hold
Gain
Republican
50–60%
60–70%
70–80%
80–90%
>90%
Democratic
40–50%
50–60%
60–70%
70–80%

The 2026 United States House of Representatives elections in Texas were held on November 3, 2026, to elect the thirty-eight U.S. representatives from the state of Texas, one from each of the state's thirty-eight congressional districts. The elections coincided with other elections to the House of Representatives, elections to the United States Senate, and various state and local elections. The primary elections took place on March 3, 2026, and in races where no candidate receives over 50% in a primary, runoff elections took place on May 26. This marked the first time since 1992 that the Democrats won the popular vote in Texas's U.S. House races.

== Redistricting ==
On July 9, 2025, the Texas state government announced that during a planned special session on July 21 of that year, it would consider mid-decade redistricting. This had been pushed privately by the White House to help Republicans keep control of the House in 2026, and critics have labeled it a gerrymander.

On August 20, 2025, the Texas House passed congressional maps that would target five Democratic-held seats. The vote was 88–52, a party-line vote. The new map changes the territory of Democratic representatives Marc Veasey, Vicente Gonzalez, Lloyd Doggett, Julie Johnson, and Al Green. On August 23, 2025, the Texas Senate passed the map with a vote 18–8. Governor Greg Abbott signed the map into law, and it was therefore the active map used in the 2026 House elections in Texas.

On November 18, 2025, a federal court blocked Texas from using its newly drawn congressional map in the 2026 midterms, ruling that the map was likely an unconstitutional "racial gerrymander". Three days later on November 21, Supreme Court Justice Samuel Alito granted the request by the state to pause the court's ruling that reverts the election back to using the maps drawn in 2021 until the full Supreme Court of the United States could make a decision. On December 4, the Supreme Court ruled that Texas could use the new map in the 2026 midterm elections, striking down the lower court's ruling.

Map of Texas's congressional districts, as passed by Governor Greg Abbott on August 29, 2025 Interactive map version

== Statewide polling ==
Poll source	Date(s) administered	Sample size (Note: Key: A – all adults RV – registered voters LV – likely voters V – unclear)	Margin of error	Republican	Democratic	Other	Undecided
Univision/YouGov	October 13–21, 2026	1,000 (RV)	± 3.8%	48%	45%	–	6%
Verasight/VoteHub	October 1–20, 2026	509 (LV)	± 4.3%	47%	43%	10%	
Verasight/VoteHub	October 1–20, 2026	509 (LV)	± 4.3%	49% (Note: With voters who lean towards a given candidate)	45%	6%	
Verasight/VoteHub	October 1–20, 2026	517 (RV)	± 4.3%	48%	41%	11%	
Verasight/VoteHub	October 1–20, 2026	517 (RV)	± 4.3%	50%	43%	7%	
Texas Public Opinion Research	October 15–18, 2026	969 (LV)	± 3.9%	51%	49%	–	–
ReconMR/Siena University	October 5–8, 2026	617 (LV)	± 4.4%	46%	47%	1%	6%
University of Texas/Texas Politics Project	September 25 – October 5, 2026	861 (LV)	± 3.3%	48%	47%	2%	3%
The New York Times/Siena University	September 21–30, 2026	615 (LV)	± 4.5%	47%	48%	—	5%
Big Data Poll	September 24–26, 2026	698 (LV)	± 4.0%	45%	41%	6%	9%
Big Data Poll	September 24–26, 2026	793 (RV)	± 4.0%	48%	42%	5%	6%
Stratus Intelligence (R) (Note: Poll sponsored by Texans for a Conservative Majority)	September 22–24, 2026	856 (LV)	± 3.5%	50%	46%	—	4%
Marist University	September 17–20, 2026	1,139 (RV)	± 4.4%	46%	49%	1% (Note: "Another party's candidate" & "No response" with 1%)	2%
Univision/YouGov	August 27 – September 4, 2026	1,000 (RV)	± 3.6%	46%	48%	1%	6%
Overton Insights (R) (Note: Poll sponsored by Texas Public Policy Foundation)	August 24–26, 2026	1,167 (LV)	± 2.9%	46%	44%	10%	—
University of Texas/Texas Politics Project	August 5–13, 2026	1,200 (RV)	± 2.83%	48%	44%	2%	6%
Texas A&M University/ReconMR/Siena University	July 27–30, 2026	619 (LV)	± 4.7%	47%	45%	1%	6%
The New York Times/Siena University	June 19–27, 2026	656 (LV)	± 4.5%	51%	45%	–	4%
University of Texas/Texas Politics Project	June 5–12, 2026	1,200 (RV)	± 2.8% (Note: ±3.4% adjusted for weighting)	49%	43%	3%	5%
Texas A&M University/ReconMR	June 1–4, 2026	807 (LV)	± 4%	49%	43%	1%	7%
University of Texas/Texas Politics Project	April 10–20, 2026	1,200 (RV)	± 2.83% (Note: ±3.35% adjusted for weighting)	43%	41%	3%	13%
University of Texas/Texas Politics Project	February 2–16, 2026	1,300 (RV)	± 5.1%	42%	42%	3%	13%

== District 1 ==
2026 Texas's 1st congressional district election
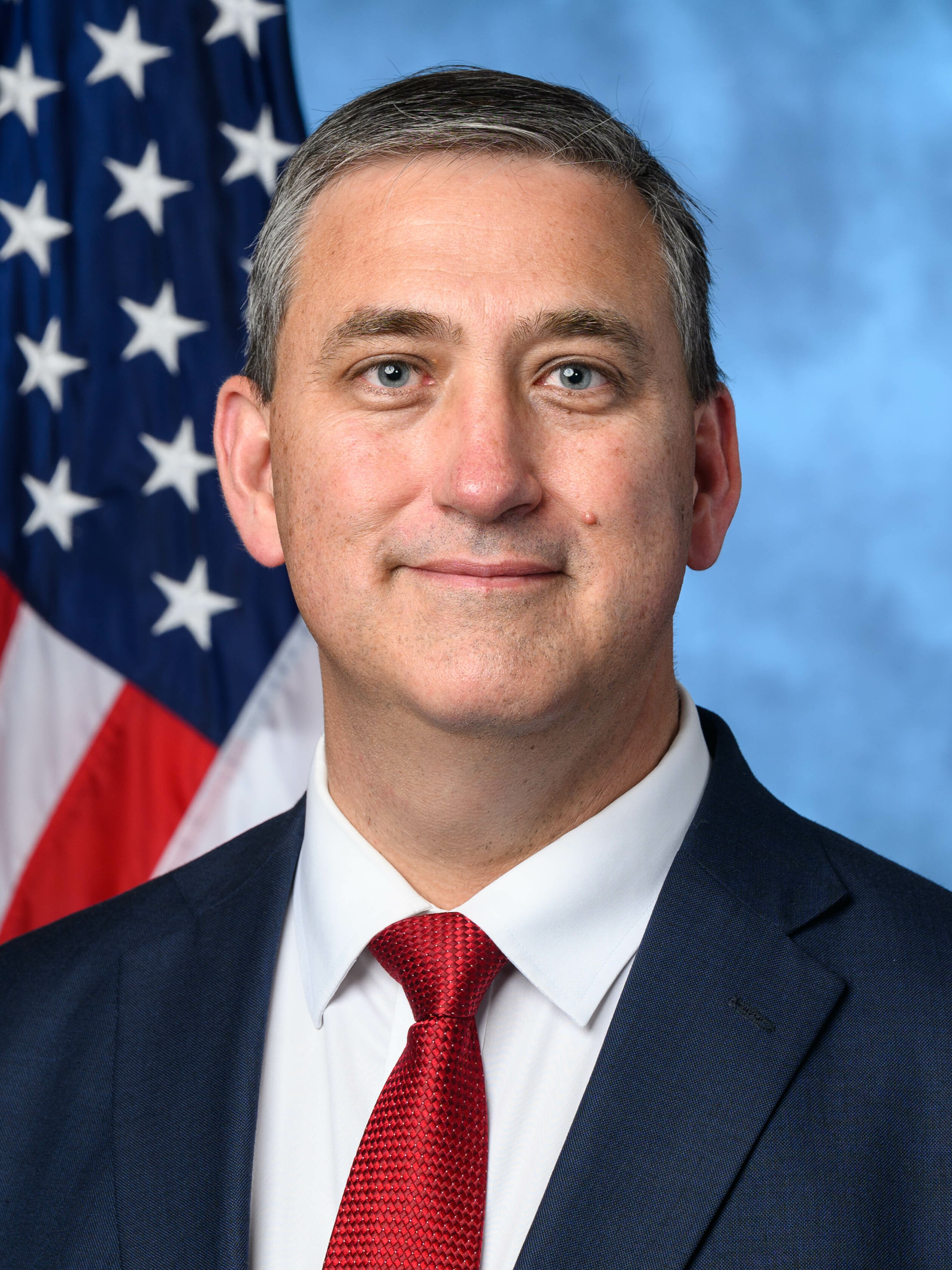

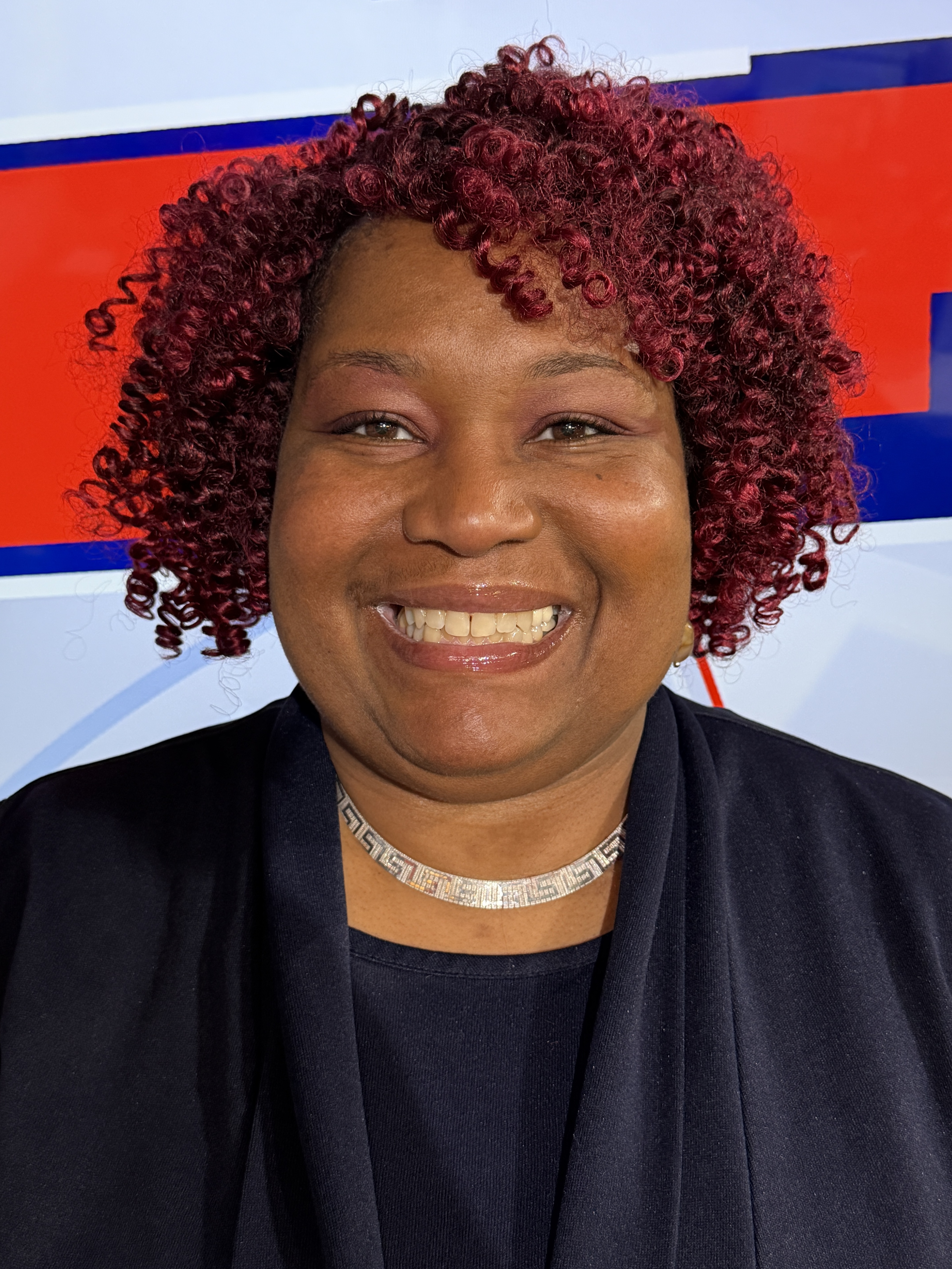
Nominee	Nathaniel Moran	Yolanda Prince
Party	Republican	Democratic
Popular vote	181,987	81,598
Percentage	69%	31%
U.S. Representative before election
Nathaniel Moran
Republican
Elected U.S. Representative
Nathaniel Moran
Republican

Texas's 1st congressional district boundary from the 2026 elections Interactive map version

The new 1st district encompasses much of East Texas, including Tyler, Longview, Nacogdoches and Texarkana. The incumbent is Republican Nathaniel Moran, who was re-elected unopposed in 2024. Donald Trump and Ted Cruz won the district in 2024 with 74.3% and 72.5% of the vote, respectively, in 2024.

=== Republican primary ===
==== Nominee ====
- Nathaniel Moran, incumbent U.S. representative

==== Withdrawn ====
- Ryan Nichols, participant in the January 6 Capitol attack

==== Endorsements ====
Nathaniel Moran

Executive branch officials

- Donald Trump, 45th and 47th president of the United States (2017–2021, 2025–present)

U.S. representatives

- Mike Johnson, speaker of the House (2023–present) from LA-04 (2017–present)

Statewide officials

- Greg Abbott, governor of Texas (2015–present)

Organizations

- AIPAC

==== Fundraising ====
Campaign finance reports as of February 11, 2026
Candidate	Raised	Spent	Cash on hand
Nathaniel Moran (R)	$1,138,149	$970,515	$548,580
Source: Federal Election Commission

==== Results ====
Republican primary results
Party	Candidate	Votes	%
Republican	Nathaniel Moran (incumbent)	80,547	100.0
Total votes		80,547	100.0

=== Democratic primary ===
==== Nominee ====
- Yolanda Prince, project manager and candidate for Texas's 6th House of Representatives district in 2018

==== Eliminated in runoff ====
- Dax Alexander, software developer

==== Eliminated in primary ====
- Tracy Andrus, nonprofit founder
- Masika Ray, realtor

==== Endorsements ====
Dax Alexander

Organizations

- Smith County Young Democrats
Yolanda Prince

Labor unions

- Texas AFL-CIO

==== Fundraising ====
Campaign finance reports as of February 11, 2026
Candidate	Raised	Spent	Cash on hand
Dax Alexander (D)	$10,766	$8,706	$2,060
Masika Ray (D)	$18,843 (Note: $13,484 of this total was self-funded Ray)	$18,064	$778
Source: Federal Election Commission

==== Results ====
Democratic primary results
Party	Candidate	Votes	%
Democratic	Yolanda Prince	15,713	44.5
Democratic	Dax Alexander	7,760	22.0
Democratic	Tracy Andrus	6,672	18.9
Democratic	Masika Ray	5,159	14.6
Total votes		35,304	100.0

==== Runoff results ====
Democratic primary runoff results
Party	Candidate	Votes	%
Democratic	Yolanda Prince	5,240	72.3
Democratic	Dax Alexander	2,011	27.7
Total votes		7,251	100.0

=== Independent and third party candidates ===
==== Filed paperwork ====
- Sonia Canchola (Independent)
- Michael Morton (Independence Party)

=== General election ===
==== Predictions ====
Source	Ranking	As of
Decision Desk HQ	Safe R	July 14, 2026
The Cook Political Report	Solid R	February 6, 2025
Inside Elections	Solid R	March 7, 2025
Sabato's Crystal Ball	Safe R	September 18, 2025
Silver Bulletin	Solid R	October 22, 2026

==== Fundraising ====
Campaign finance reports as of April 26, 2026
Candidate	Raised	Spent	Cash on hand
Nathaniel Moran (R)	$1,385,301	$1,131,997	$634,251
Yolanda Prince (D)	$8,160	$1,002	$2,059
Sonia Canchola (I)	$0	$0	$0
Source: Federal Election Commission

==== Results ====
2026 Texas's 1st congressional district election results
Party	Candidate	Votes	%
Republican	Nathaniel Moran (incumbent)		
Democratic	Yolanda Prince		
Independent	Sonia Canciola		
Total votes			100

== District 2 ==
2026 Texas's 2nd congressional district election
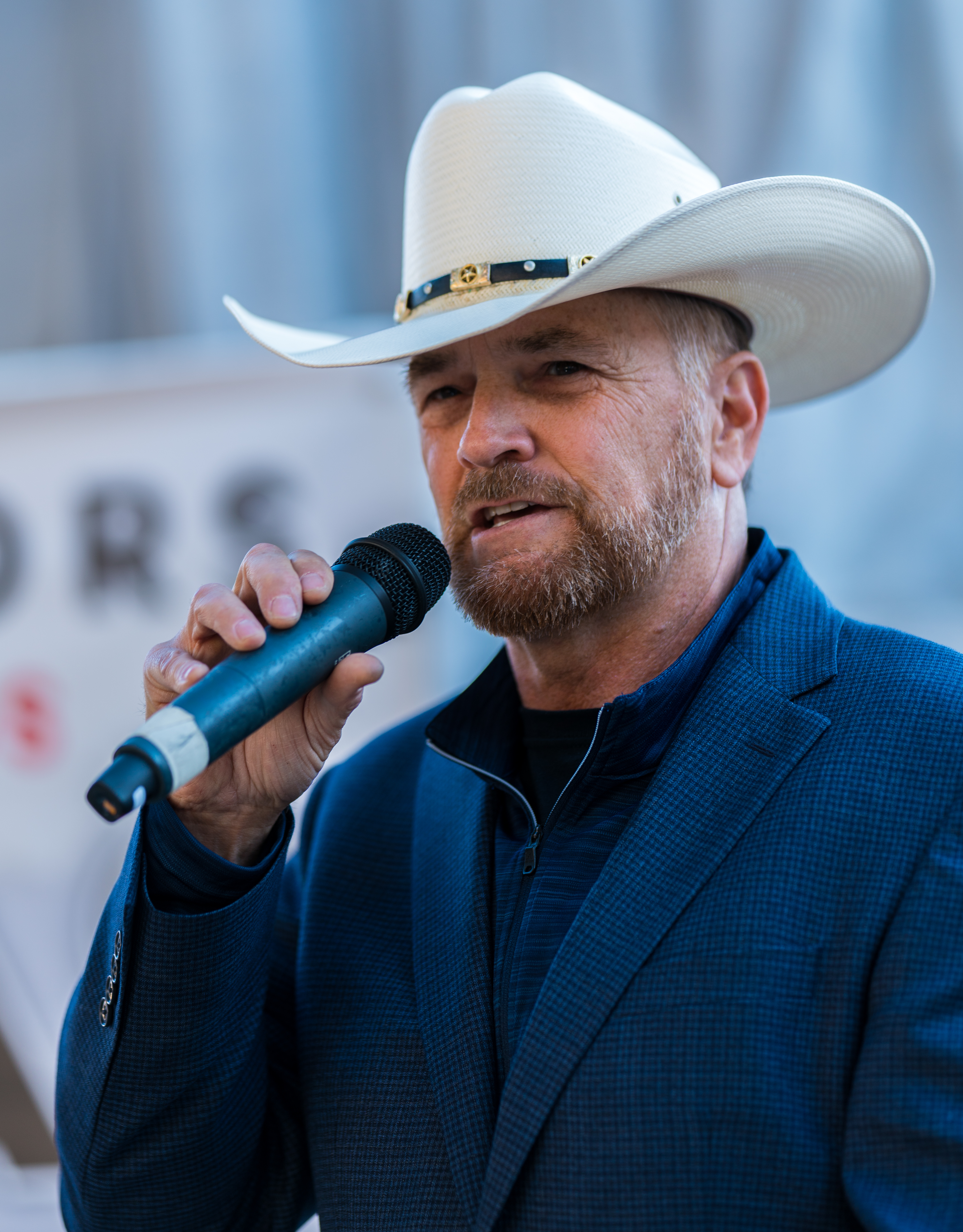

Nominee	Steve Toth	Shaun Finnie
Party	Republican	Democratic
Popular vote	144,748	139,167
Percentage	51%	49%
U.S. Representative before election
Dan Crenshaw
Republican
Elected U.S. Representative
Steve Toth
Republican

Texas's 2nd congressional district boundary from the 2026 elections Interactive map version

The new 2nd district encompasses most of the northern and northeastern suburbs of Houston, including The Woodlands, Spring, New Caney, Humble, and Atascocita, as well as the Kingwood and Willowbrook areas of Houston itself. The incumbent is Republican Dan Crenshaw, who was re-elected with 65.7% of the vote in 2024, will not be on the general election ballot since he was defeated in the primary by State Representative Steve Toth. Donald Trump and Ted Cruz won 60.8% and 58.0% of the vote, respectively, in this district in 2024.

=== Republican primary ===
==== Nominee ====
- Steve Toth, state representative from the 15th district (2013–2015, 2019–present) and candidate for the 8th Congressional district in 2016

==== Eliminated in primary ====
- Dan Crenshaw, incumbent U.S. representative
- Martin Etwop, Christian missionary and candidate for this district in 2022
- Nicholas Lee Plumb, retail manager

==== Withdrawn ====
- Jon Bonck, mortgage broker (running in the 38th district)
- Valentina Gomez, financial strategist and candidate for Missouri secretary of state in 2024 (ran in the 31st district)
- Nick Tran, businessman (ran in the 8th district)

==== Declined ====
- Jameson Ellis, marketing executive and candidate for this district in 2022 and 2024

==== Endorsements ====
Dan Crenshaw

U.S. representatives

- Jim Jordan, OH-04 (2007–present)
- Anna Paulina Luna, FL-13 (2023–present)

State legislators

- Charles Cunningham, state representative from the 127th district (2023–present)
- Sam Harless, state representative from the 126th district (2019–present)

Labor unions

- National Border Patrol Council

Organizations

- AIPAC
- NRA Political Victory Fund
- Texas Alliance for Life

Newspapers

- Houston Chronicle
Steve Toth

U.S. senators

- Ted Cruz, Texas (2013–present)

State legislators

- Nate Schatzline, state representative from the 93rd district (2023–present)
- 20 other state legislators

Individuals

- Jim McIngvale, businessman

Organizations

- Freedom Caucus Fund
- Gun Owners of America Texas
- Texas Gun Rights
- Turning Point Action

==== Fundraising ====
Campaign finance reports as of February 11, 2026
Candidate	Raised	Spent	Cash on hand
Dan Crenshaw (R)	$2,138,124	$2,051,280	$556,151
Martin Etwop (R)	$13,787	$10,400	$995
Nicholas Lee Plumb (R)	$9,244	$6,216	$3,028
Steve Toth (R)	$589,340 (Note: $13,000 of this total was self-funded by Toth)	$324,371	$264,968
Source: Federal Election Commission

==== Polling ====
Poll source	Date(s) administered	Sample size	Margin of error	Dan Crenshaw	Martin Etwop	Steve Toth	Other	Undecided
Meeting Street Research (R) (Note: Poll sponsored by Crenshaw's campaign)	October 21–23, 2025	400 (LV)	± 4.9%	47%	1%	19%	5% (Note: Manning and Zolari with 2%; Plumb with 1%)	25%

==== Results ====
2026 GOP primary results by county: Toth: 50–60%; 60–70%

Republican primary results
Party	Candidate	Votes	%
Republican	Steve Toth	36,830	55.8
Republican	Dan Crenshaw (incumbent)	26,859	40.7
Republican	Martin Etwop	1,216	1.8
Republican	Nicholas Lee Plumb	1,106	1.7
Total votes		66,011	100.0

=== Democratic primary ===
==== Nominee ====
- Shaun Finnie, investment banker

==== Endorsements ====
Shaun Finnie

Labor unions

- Texas AFL-CIO

==== Fundraising ====
Campaign finance reports as of February 11, 2026
Candidate	Raised	Spent	Cash on hand
Shaun Finnie (D)	$2,308,251 (Note: $1,718,000 of this total was self-funded by Finnie)	$756,806	$1,551,445
Source: Federal Election Commission

==== Results ====
Democratic primary results
Party	Candidate	Votes	%
Democratic	Shaun Finnie	48,700	100.0
Total votes		48,700	100.0

=== General election ===
==== Predictions ====
Source	Ranking	As of
Decision Desk HQ	Likely R	October 30, 2026
The Cook Political Report	Solid R	February 6, 2025
Inside Elections	Solid R	March 7, 2025
Sabato's Crystal Ball	Safe R	September 18, 2025
Silver Bulletin	Solid R	October 22, 2026

==== Post-primary endorsements ====
Shaun Finnie (D)

Newspapers

- Houston Chronicle

==== Fundraising ====
Campaign finance reports as of September 30, 2026
Candidate	Raised	Spent	Cash on hand
Steve Toth (R)	$976,355	$808,744	$167,611
Shaun Finnie (D)	$3,131,705	$2,717,536	$414,170
Source: Federal Election Commission

==== Polling ====
Poll source	Date(s) administered	Sample size	Margin of error	Steve Toth (R)	Shaun Finnie (D)	Undecided
Impact Research (D) (Note: Poll sponsored by Finnie's campaign)	September 29 – October 4, 2026	501 (LV)	± 4.4%	46%	37%	16%

==== Results ====
2026 Texas's 2nd congressional district election
Party	Candidate	Votes	%	±%
Republican	Steve Toth			
Democratic	Shaun Finnie			
Total votes				

== District 3 ==
2026 Texas's 3rd congressional district election
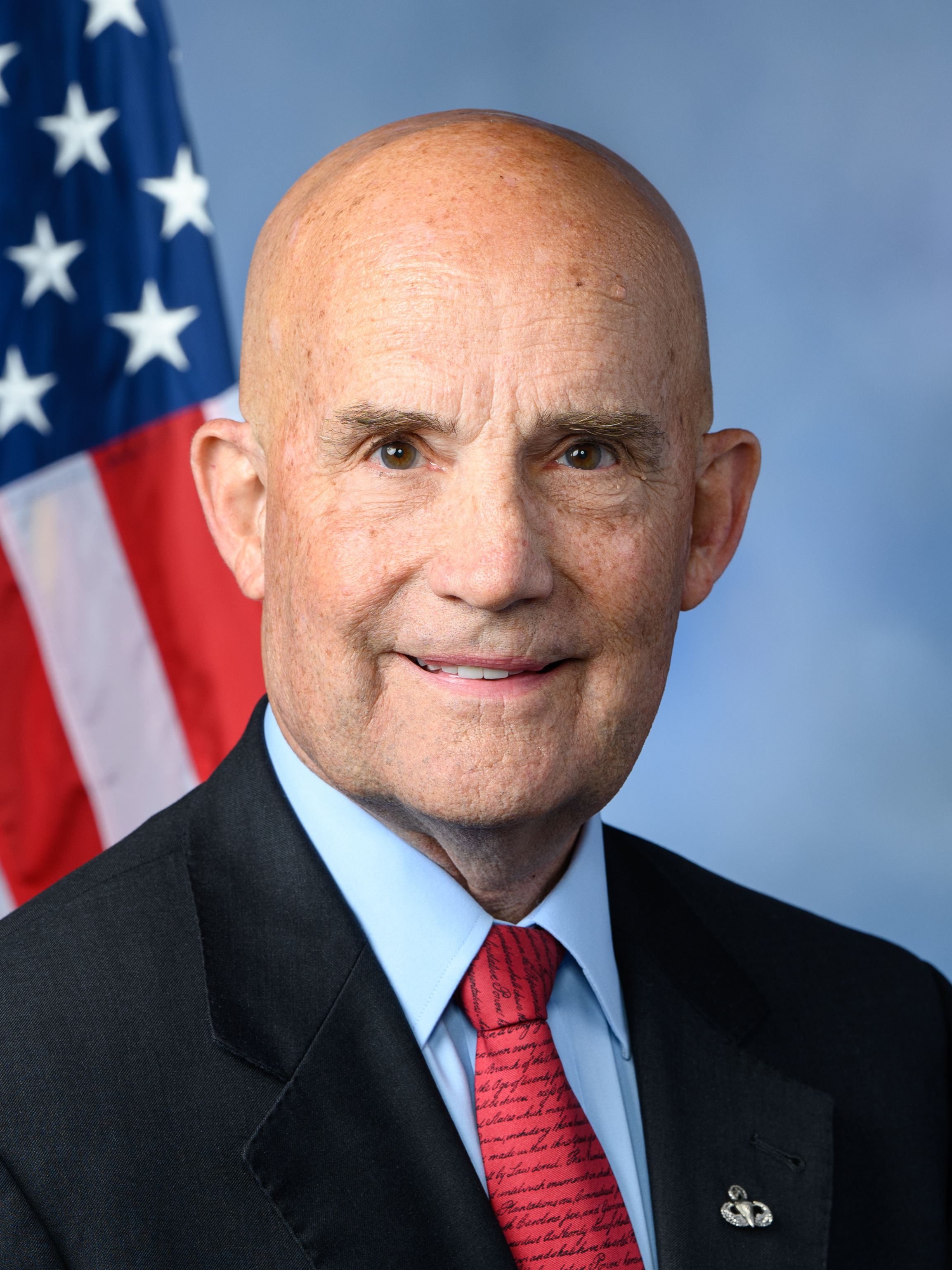

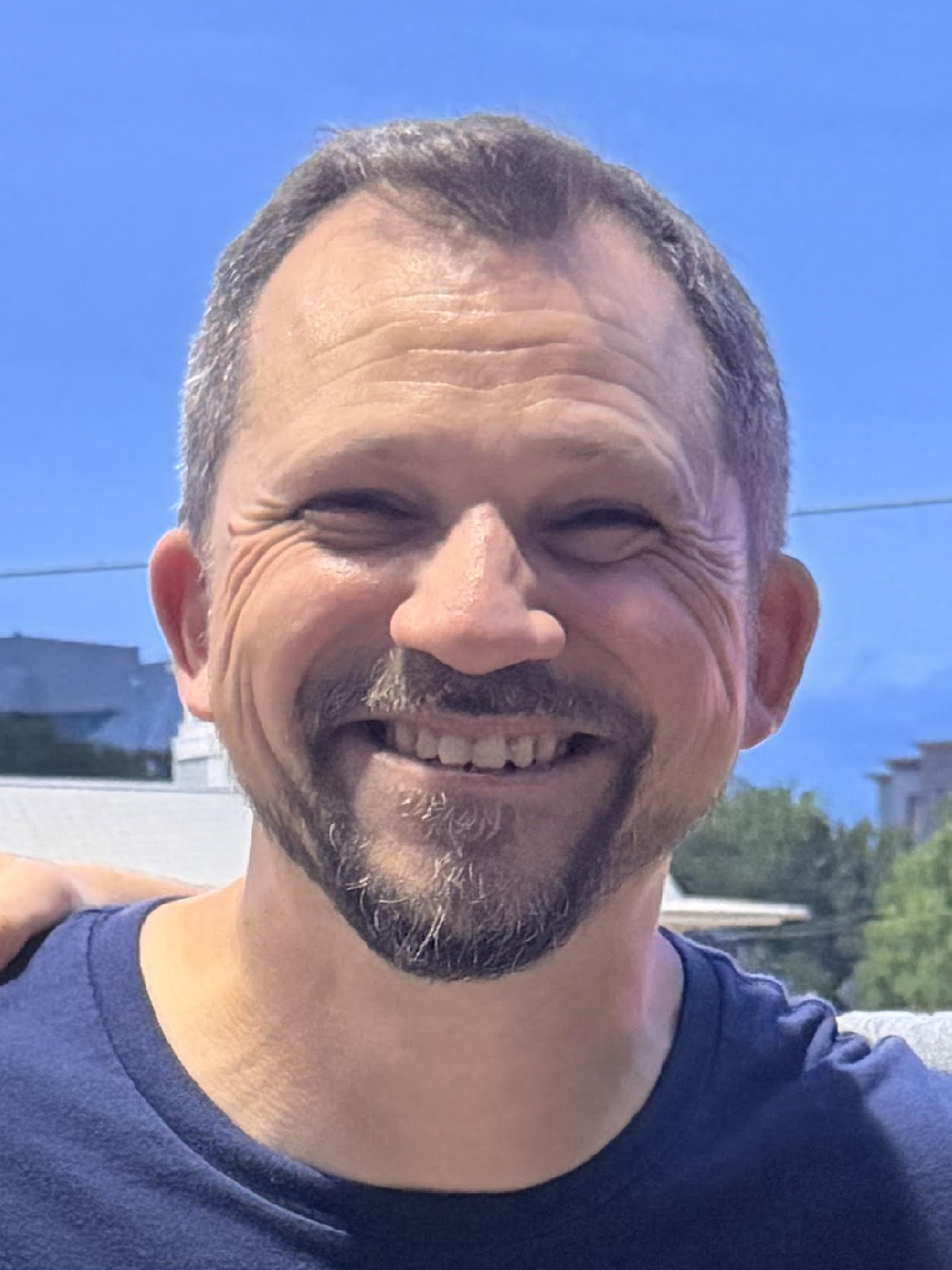
Nominee	Keith Self	Evan Hunt
Party	Republican	Democratic
Popular vote	169,243	151,667
Percentage	52.7%	47.3%
U.S. Representative before election
Keith Self
Republican
Elected U.S. Representative
Keith Self
Republican

Texas's 3rd congressional district boundary from the 2026 elections Interactive map version

The new 3rd district encompasses much of Collin County and Hunt County in the Dallas–Fort Worth Metroplex, including eastern Plano, McKinney, Allen, Wylie and Greenville, as well as much of the I-30 corridor to the east including Sulphur Springs and Mount Pleasant. The incumbent is Republican Keith Self, who was re-elected with 62.5% of the vote in 2024. Donald Trump and Ted Cruz each respectively won 60.3% and 57.7% of the vote here in 2024.

=== Republican primary ===
==== Nominee ====
- Keith Self, incumbent U.S. representative

==== Eliminated in primary ====
- Mark Newgent, U.S. Army veteran

==== Endorsements ====
Keith Self

Executive branch officials

- Donald Trump, 45th and 47th president of the United States (2017–2021, 2025–present)

Statewide officials

- Greg Abbott, governor of Texas (2015–present)

Organizations

- AIPAC
- Turning Point Action

==== Fundraising ====
Campaign finance reports as of February 11, 2026
Candidate	Raised	Spent	Cash on hand
Mark Newgent (R)	$128,343 (Note: $109 of this total was self-funded by Newgent)	$100,983	$27,359
Keith Self (R)	$406,033	$260,292	$255,081
Source: Federal Election Commission

==== Results ====
Republican primary results
Party	Candidate	Votes	%
Republican	Keith Self (incumbent)	63,747	80.2
Republican	Mark Newgent	15,761	19.8
Total votes		79,508	100.0

=== Democratic primary ===
==== Nominee ====
- Evan Hunt, retired Air Force lieutenant colonel

==== Withdrawn ====
- Jordan Wheatley, behavior health technician

==== Fundraising ====
Campaign finance reports as of February 11, 2026
Candidate	Raised	Spent	Cash on hand
Evan Hunt (D)	$279,905 (Note: $75,000 of this total was self-funded by Hunt)	$259,484	$20,420
Source: Federal Election Commission

==== Results ====
Democratic primary results
Party	Candidate	Votes	%
Democratic	Evan Hunt	48,800	100.0
Total votes		48,800	100.0

=== General election ===
==== Predictions ====
Source	Ranking	As of
Decision Desk HQ	Safe R	July 14, 2026
The Cook Political Report	Solid R	February 6, 2025
Inside Elections	Solid R	March 7, 2025
Sabato's Crystal Ball	Safe R	September 18, 2025
Silver Bulletin	Solid R	October 22, 2026

==== Fundraising ====
Campaign finance reports as of April 26, 2026
Candidate	Raised	Spent	Cash on hand
Keith Self (R)	$504,420	$482,950	$130,812
Evan Hunt (D)	$336,981	$305,935	$31,046
Source: Federal Election Commission

==== Results ====
2026 Texas's 3rd congressional district election
Party	Candidate	Votes	%	±%
Republican	Keith Self (incumbent)			
Democratic	Evan Hunt			
Total votes				

== District 4 ==
2026 Texas's 4th congressional district election
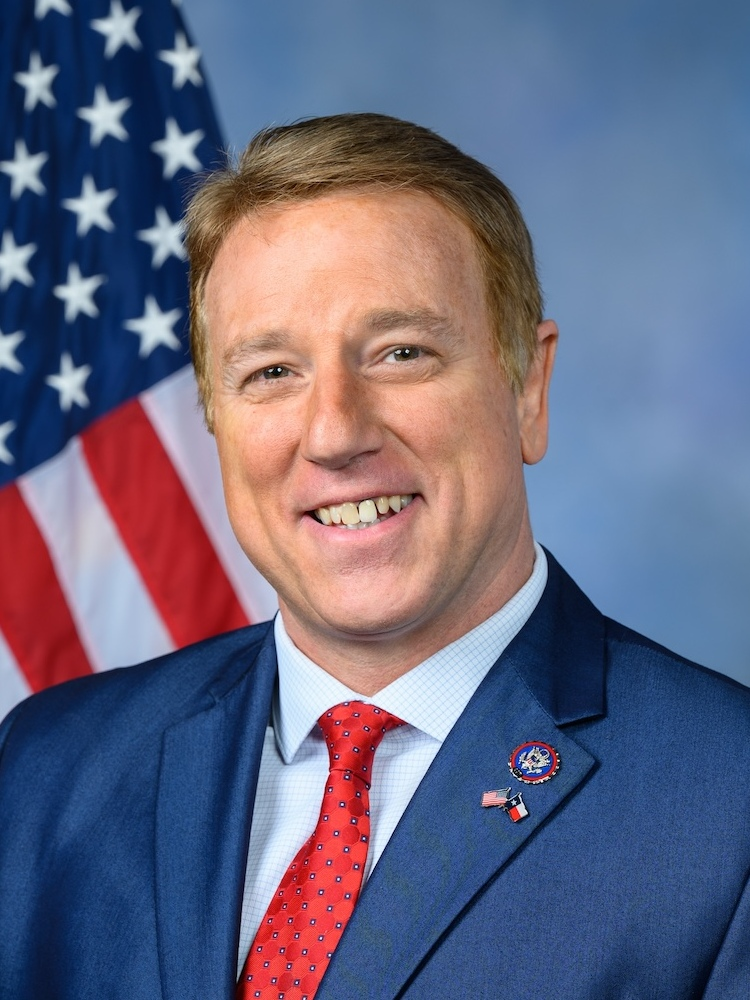

Nominee	Pat Fallon	Jason Pearce
Party	Republican	Democratic
Popular vote	171,652	134,563
Percentage	56.1%	43.9%
U.S. Representative before election
Pat Fallon
Republican
Elected U.S. Representative
Pat Fallon
Republican

Texas's 4th congressional district boundary from the 2026 elections Interactive map version

The new 4th district encompasses most of the counties in the eastern part of the Texoma region along the Red River, including the communities of Sherman and Paris, as well as some sections of the suburban and exurban DFW Metroplex including Frisco, most of Plano and the Collin County portion of Dallas. The incumbent is Republican Pat Fallon, who was re-elected with 68.4% of the vote in 2024. Donald Trump and Ted Cruz each respectively won 61.2% and 59.0% of the vote here in 2024.

=== Republican primary ===
==== Nominee ====
- Pat Fallon, incumbent U.S. representative

==== Eliminated in primary ====
- Don Horn, farmer and candidate for this seat in 2024

==== Endorsements ====
Pat Fallon

Executive branch officials

- Donald Trump, 45th and 47th president of the United States (2017–2021, 2025–present)

Statewide officials

- Greg Abbott, governor of Texas (2015–present)

Organizations

- AIPAC

==== Fundraising ====
Campaign finance reports as of February 11, 2026
Candidate	Raised	Spent	Cash on hand
Pat Fallon (R)	$594,809	$254,577	$1,000,309
Source: Federal Election Commission

==== Results ====
Republican primary results
Party	Candidate	Votes	%
Republican	Pat Fallon (incumbent)	59,828	80.6
Republican	Don Horn	14,383	19.4
Total votes		74,211	100.0

=== Democratic primary ===
==== Nominee ====
- Jason Pearce, construction project manager

==== Eliminated in primary ====
- Andrew Rubell, teacher

==== Fundraising ====
Campaign finance reports as of February 11, 2026
Candidate	Raised	Spent	Cash on hand
Jason Pearce (D)	$9,294 (Note: $8,609 of this total was self-funded by Pearce)	$7,320	$1,974
Andrew Rubell (D) (Note: Did not file pre-primary report)	$3,715	$3,658	$56
Source: Federal Election Commission

==== Results ====
Democratic primary results
Party	Candidate	Votes	%
Democratic	Jason Pearce	23,552	52.0
Democratic	Andrew Rubell	21,779	48.0
Total votes		45,331	100.0

=== General election ===
==== Predictions ====
Source	Ranking	As of
Decision Desk HQ	Safe R	July 14, 2026
The Cook Political Report	Solid R	February 6, 2025
Inside Elections	Solid R	March 7, 2025
Sabato's Crystal Ball	Safe R	September 18, 2025
Silver Bulletin	Solid R	October 22, 2026

==== Fundraising ====
Campaign finance reports as of April 26, 2026
Candidate	Raised	Spent	Cash on hand
Pat Fallon (R)	$685,489	$283,212	$1,062,356
Jason Pearce (D)	$11,783	$10,906	$877
Source: Federal Election Commission

==== Results ====
2026 Texas's 4th congressional district election
Party	Candidate	Votes	%	±%
Republican	Pat Fallon (incumbent)			
Democratic	Jason Pearce			
Total votes				

== District 5 ==
2026 Texas's 5th congressional district election
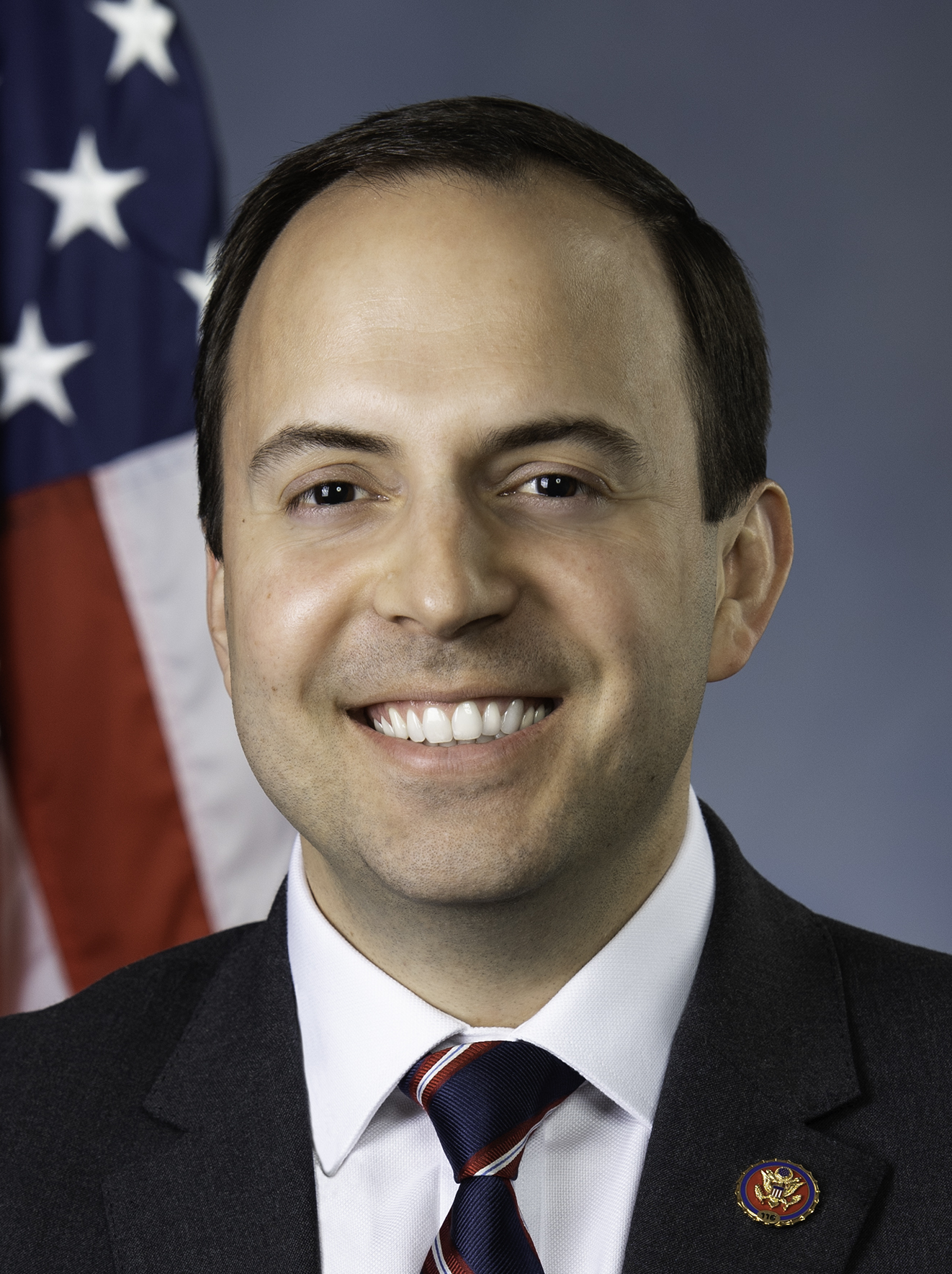

Nominee	Lance Gooden	Chelsey Hockett
Party	Republican	Democratic
Popular vote	130,278	122,855
Percentage	51.5%	48.5%
U.S. Representative before election
Lance Gooden
Republican
Elected U.S. Representative
Lance Gooden
Republican

Texas's 5th congressional district boundary from the 2026 elections Interactive map version

The new 5th district encompasses the southeastern parts of the Dallas–Fort Worth Metroplex and points south, including Mesquite, Terrell, Palestine, Athens, Canton, Kaufman, the southern halves of Garland and Rowlett, and the Lakewood and Lake Highlands portions of Dallas. The incumbent is Republican Lance Gooden, who was re-elected with 64.1% of the vote in 2024. Donald Trump and Ted Cruz each respectively won 60.1% and 56.9% of the vote in this district in 2024.

=== Republican primary ===
==== Nominee ====
- Lance Gooden, incumbent U.S. representative

==== Disqualified ====
- Travis Edwards, teacher

==== Withdrawn ====
- James Ussery, telecom technician (ran in the 32nd district)

==== Endorsements ====
Lance Gooden

Executive branch officials

- Donald Trump, 45th and 47th president of the United States (2017–2021, 2025–present)

Statewide officials

- Greg Abbott, governor of Texas (2015–present)

Organizations

- AIPAC

==== Fundraising ====
Campaign finance reports as of February 11, 2026
Candidate	Raised	Spent	Cash on hand
Travis Edwards (R)	$17,628	$17,883	$27
Lance Gooden (R)	$860,024	$509,492	$1,067,888
Source: Federal Election Commission

==== Results ====
Republican primary results
Party	Candidate	Votes	%
Republican	Lance Gooden (incumbent)	50,424	100.0
Total votes		50,424	100.0

=== Democratic primary ===
==== Nominee ====
- Chelsey Hockett, stay-at-home mom

==== Eliminated in runoff ====
- Ruth Torres, HR consultant and nominee for this district in 2024

===== Eliminated in primary =====
- Forrest Lumpkin, aerospace engineer

==== Endorsements ====
Chelsey Hockett

Labor unions

- Texas AFL-CIO

==== Fundraising ====
Campaign finance reports as of February 11, 2026
Candidate	Raised	Spent	Cash on hand
Chelsey Hockett (D)	$7,816	-$6,459	$5,970
Ruth Torres (D)	$10,625 (Note: $10,000 of this total was self-funded by Torres)	$9,387	$1,512
Source: Federal Election Commission

==== Results ====
Democratic primary results
Party	Candidate	Votes	%
Democratic	Chelsey Hockett	23,972	45.9
Democratic	Ruth Torres	21,721	41.6
Democratic	Forrest Lumpkin	6,569	12.6
Total votes		52,262	100.0

==== Runoff results ====
Democratic primary runoff results
Party	Candidate	Votes	%
Democratic	Chelsey Hockett	5,665	53.0
Democratic	Ruth Torres	5,023	47.0
Total votes		10,688	100.0

=== Independents ===
==== Filed paperwork ====
- Deadra Marsh-Foy

=== General election ===
==== Predictions ====
Source	Ranking	As of
Decision Desk HQ	Safe R	October 20, 2026
The Cook Political Report	Solid R	February 6, 2025
Inside Elections	Solid R	March 7, 2025
Sabato's Crystal Ball	Safe R	September 18, 2025
Silver Bulletin	Solid R	October 22, 2026

==== Fundraising ====
Campaign finance reports as of April 26, 2026
Candidate	Raised	Spent	Cash on hand
Lance Gooden (R)	$1,170,230	$554,887	$1,337,500
Chelsey Hockett (D)	$11,105	$-9,690	$1,056
Source: Federal Election Commission

==== Results ====
2026 Texas's 5th congressional district election
Party	Candidate	Votes	%	±%
Republican	Lance Gooden (incumbent)			
Democratic	Chelsey Hockett			
Total votes				

== District 6 ==
2026 Texas's 6th congressional district election
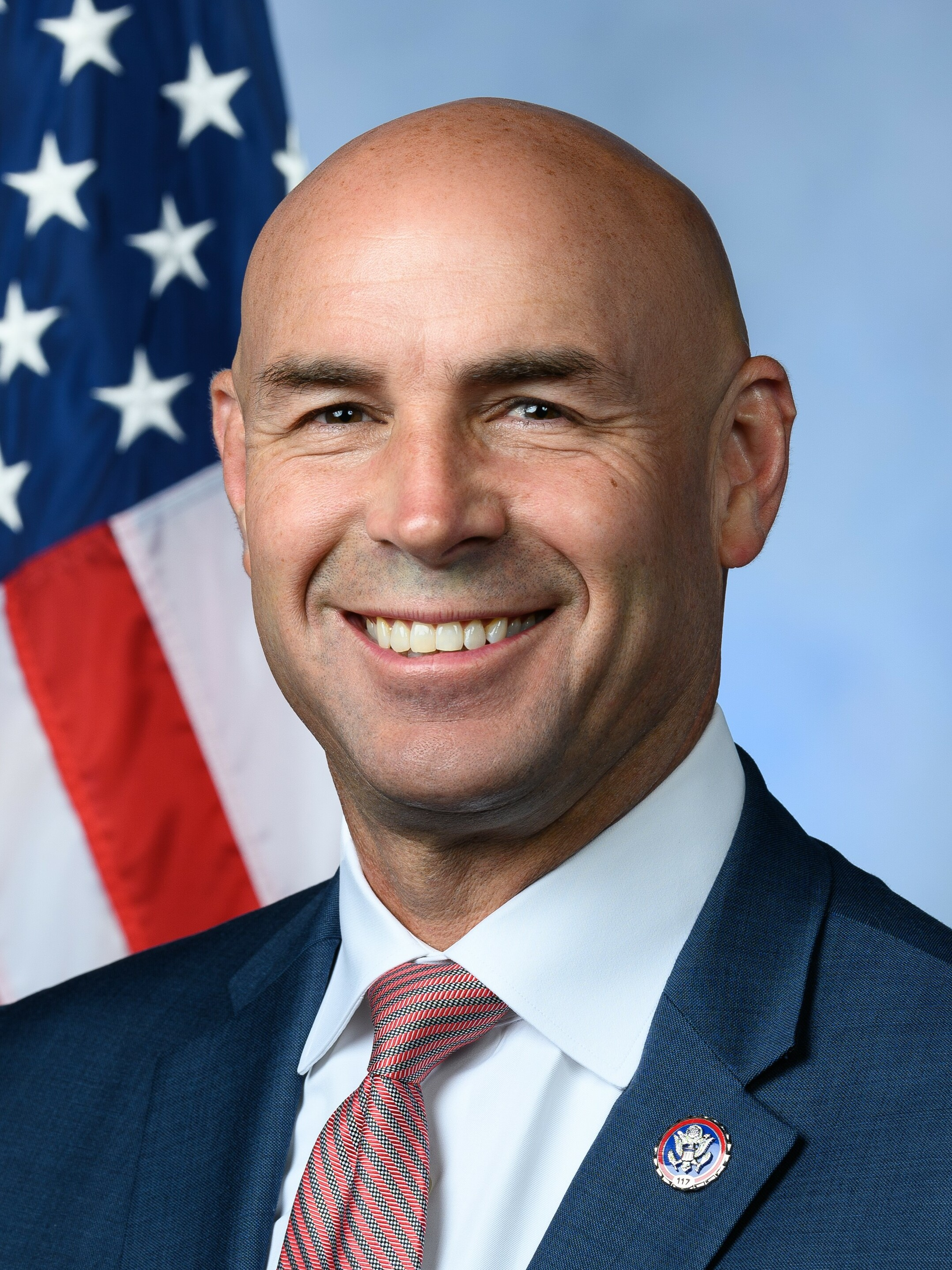

Nominee	Jake Ellzey	Danny Minton
Party	Republican	Democratic
Popular vote	140,014	128,394
Percentage	52.2%	47.8%
U.S. Representative before election
Jake Ellzey
Republican
Elected U.S. Representative
Jake Ellzey
Republican

Texas's 6th congressional district boundary from the 2026 elections Interactive map version

The new 6th district encompasses most of the southern parts of the Dallas–Fort Worth Metroplex, including most or all of the suburbs of Midlothian, Mansfield, Burleson, Waxahachie and Corsicana, as well as most of the west side of Arlington and south and central Irving. The incumbent is Republican Jake Ellzey, who was re-elected with 66.4% of the vote in 2024. Donald Trump and Ted Cruz won 60.4% and 57.4%, respectively, in this district in 2024.

=== Republican primary ===
==== Nominee ====
- Jake Ellzey, incumbent U.S. representative

==== Eliminated in primary ====
- James Buford, pastor and candidate for this district in 2022 and 2024
- Brian Stahl, Covington city councilman

==== Endorsements ====
Jake Ellzey

Executive branch officials

- Donald Trump, 45th and 47th president of the United States (2017–2021, 2025–present)

Statewide officials

- Greg Abbott, governor of Texas (2015–present)

Organizations

- AIPAC
- Texas Alliance for Life

==== Fundraising ====
Campaign finance reports as of February 11, 2026
Candidate	Raised	Spent	Cash on hand
James Buford (R)	$66,861	$65,733	$1,161
Jake Ellzey (R)	$3,101,985	$2,295,098	$1,902,334
Brian Stahl (R)	$179,439	$145,069	$34,369
Source: Federal Election Commission

==== Results ====
2026 GOP primary results by county: Ellzey: 50–60%; 60–70%; 70–80%

Republican primary results
Party	Candidate	Votes	%
Republican	Jake Ellzey (incumbent)	42,230	66.3
Republican	James Buford	12,660	19.9
Republican	Brian Stahl	8,813	13.8
Total votes		63,703	100.0

=== Democratic primary ===
==== Nominee ====
- Danny Minton, sales representative

==== Fundraising ====
Campaign finance reports as of February 11, 2026
Candidate	Raised	Spent	Cash on hand
Danny Minton (D)	$12,840 (Note: $3,125 of this total was self-funded by Minton)	$7,374	$5,465
Source: Federal Election Commission

==== Results ====
Democratic primary results
Party	Candidate	Votes	%
Democratic	Danny Minton	45,306	100.0
Total votes		45,306	100.0

=== General election ===
==== Predictions ====
Source	Ranking	As of
Decision Desk HQ	Safe R	July 14, 2026
The Cook Political Report	Solid R	February 6, 2025
Inside Elections	Solid R	March 7, 2025
Sabato's Crystal Ball	Safe R	September 18, 2025
Silver Bulletin	Solid R	October 22, 2026

==== Post-primary endorsements ====
Jake Ellzey (R)

Organizations

- U.S. Chamber of Commerce
Danny Minton (D)

Organizations

- Track AIPAC

==== Fundraising ====
Campaign finance reports as of April 26, 2026
Candidate	Raised	Spent	Cash on hand
Jake Ellzey (R)	$3,705,546	$2,700,452	$2,100,542
Danny Minton (D)	$25,133	$15,752	$9,381
Source: Federal Election Commission

==== Results ====
2026 Texas's 6th congressional district election
Party	Candidate	Votes	%	±%
Republican	Jake Ellzey (incumbent)			
Democratic	Danny Minton			
Total votes				

== District 7 ==
2026 Texas's 7th congressional district election
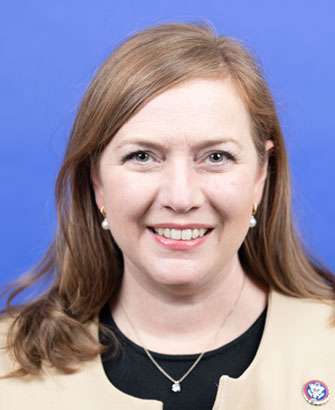

Nominee	Lizzie Fletcher	Alexander Hale
Party	Democratic	Republican
Popular vote	160,454	62,387
Percentage	70.8%	27.5%
U.S. Representative before election
Lizzie Fletcher
Democratic
Elected U.S. Representative
Lizzie Fletcher
Democratic

Texas's 7th congressional district boundary from the 2026 elections Interactive map version

The new 7th district encompasses a diverse southwestern stretch of the Greater Houston area across Harris and Fort Bend counties, including the Galleria area of Houston and the inner West Loop neighborhoods of Montrose, Meyerland, Rice Military, the Heights and Greenway Plaza, along with such diverse southwest Houston neighborhoods as Westchase, Sharpstown, Gulfton and Alief, and largely Asian and Hispanic portions of western Sugar Land and Mission Bend in Fort Bend County. The incumbent is Democrat Lizzie Fletcher, who was re-elected with 61.2% of the vote in 2024. The diverse district gave 60.3% to Kamala Harris and 63.1% to Colin Allred in 2024.

=== Democratic primary ===
==== Nominee ====
- Lizzie Fletcher, incumbent U.S. representative

==== Endorsements ====
Lizzie Fletcher

Labor unions

- National Education Association'
- Texas AFL-CIO

Organizations

- AIPAC
- Democratic Majority for Israel
- EMILY's List
- Jewish Democratic Council of America
- Joint Action Committee for Political Affairs
- Planned Parenthood Action Fund
- Population Connection
- Reproductive Freedom for All

==== Fundraising ====
Campaign finance reports as of February 11, 2026
Candidate	Raised	Spent	Cash on hand
Lizzie Fletcher (D)	$1,030,466	$535,841	$1,811,286
Source: Federal Election Commission

==== Results ====
Democratic primary results
Party	Candidate	Votes	%
Democratic	Lizzie Fletcher (incumbent)	61,930	100.0
Total votes		61,930	100.0

=== Republican primary ===
==== Nominee ====
- Alexander Hale, consultant

==== Eliminated in runoff ====
- Tina Blum Cohen, furniture company owner and candidate for this district in 2022 and 2024

==== Eliminated in primary ====
- Alexander Kalai, CFO of Amerapex
- Erin Montgomery, funeral director

==== Endorsements ====
Alexander Hale

Newspapers

- Houston Chronicle

==== Fundraising ====
Campaign finance reports as of February 11, 2026
Candidate	Raised	Spent	Cash on hand
Tina Blum Cohen (R)	$25	$35,066	$58,842
Alexander Hale (R)	$38,560 (Note: $3,610 of this total was self-funded by Hale)	$17,544	$21,016
Alexander Kalai (R)	$182,034 (Note: $134,294 of this total was self-funded by Kalai)	$156,033	$26,001
Source: Federal Election Commission

==== Results ====
Republican primary results
Party	Candidate	Votes	%
Republican	Alexander Hale	10,028	45.3
Republican	Tina Blum Cohen	5,940	26.8
Republican	Erin Montgomery	3,423	15.5
Republican	Alexander Kalai	2,761	12.5
Total votes		22,152	100.0

==== Runoff results ====
Republican primary runoff results
Party	Candidate	Votes	%
Republican	Alexander Hale	11,164	64.3
Republican	Tina Blum Cohen	6,195	35.7
Total votes		17,359	100.0

=== Green convention ===
==== Candidates ====
- Espoir Ngabo, IT analyst

=== General election ===
==== Predictions ====
Source	Ranking	As of
Decision Desk HQ	Safe D	July 14, 2026
The Cook Political Report	Solid D	February 6, 2025
Inside Elections	Solid D	March 7, 2025
Sabato's Crystal Ball	Safe D	September 18, 2025
Silver Bulletin	Solid D	October 22, 2026

==== Post-primary endorsements ====
Lizzie Fletcher (D)

Labor unions

- American Federation of Government Employees

Organizations

- Black Economic Alliance PAC
- Giffords

==== Fundraising ====
Campaign finance reports as of May 26, 2026
Candidate	Raised	Spent	Cash on hand
Lizzie Fletcher (D)	$1,229,657	$795,425	$1,750,894
Alexander Hale (R)	$61,761	$55,729	$6,031
Espoir Ngabo (G)	$3,133	$3,125	$8
Source: Federal Election Commission

==== Results ====
2026 Texas's 7th congressional district election
Party	Candidate	Votes	%	±%
Democratic	Lizzie Fletcher (incumbent)			
Republican	Alexander Hale			
Green	Espoir Ngabo			
Total votes				

== District 8 ==
2026 Texas's 8th congressional district election
Nominee	Jessica Steinmann	Laura Jones
Party	Republican	Democratic
Popular vote	141,786	124,680
Percentage	53.2%	46.8%
U.S. Representative before election
Morgan Luttrell
Republican
Elected U.S. Representative
Jessica Steinmann
Republican

Texas's 8th congressional district boundary from the 2026 elections Interactive map version

The 8th district includes most of the northern and northwestern exurbs of Houston, including Conroe, part of Huntsville, Willis, Magnolia, Brookshire and Hempstead, along with parts of west Houston including Briar Forest, the western end of the Energy Corridor and most of the Bear Creek and Addicks areas in west Harris County. The incumbent is Republican Morgan Luttrell, who was elected with 68.2% of the vote in 2024. Luttrell is not seeking reelection in the heavily Republican district, which gave Donald Trump 63.2% and Ted Cruz 60.1% of the vote in 2024 and is a plurality White district with a 31.3% Hispanic voting age population.

=== Republican primary ===
==== Nominee ====
- Jessica Steinmann, attorney

==== Eliminated in primary ====
- Jay Fondren, nonprofit official
- Stephen Long
- Nick Tran, businessman (previously ran in the 2nd district)
- Deddrick Wilmer, mortage broker (previously ran in the 9th district)

==== Withdrawn ====
- Brett Jensen, businessman (remained on ballot)

==== Declined ====
- Morgan Luttrell, incumbent U.S. representative (endorsed Steinmann)

==== Endorsements ====
Jessica Steinmann

Executive branch officials

- David Bernhardt, United States Secretary of the Interior (2019–2021)
- Donald Trump, president of the United States (2017–2021, 2025–present)

U.S. senators

- Ted Cruz, Texas (2013–present)

U.S. representatives

- Jake Ellzey, TX-06 (2021–present)
- Tom Emmer, House majority whip (2023–present) from MN–08 (2015–present)
- Brandon Gill, TX–26 (2025–present)
- Lance Gooden, TX-05 (2019–present)
- Kevin Hern, OK-01 (2018–present)
- Ronny Jackson, TX-13 (2021–present)
- Mike Johnson, speaker of the House (2023–present) from LA-04 (2017–present)
- Jim Jordan, OH-04 (2007–present)
- Morgan Luttrell, TX–08 (2023–present)
- Kenny Marchant, former TX-24 (2005–2021)
- Lisa McClain, MI-09 (2021–present)
- Troy Nehls, TX–22 (2021–present)
- August Pfluger, TX-11 (2021–present)
- Ted Poe, former TX-02 (2005–2019)
- Steve Scalise, House majority leader (2023–present) from LA-01 (2008–present)
- Randy Weber, TX-14 (2013–present)
- Jerry Weller, former IL-11 (1995–2009)

Statewide officials

- Greg Abbott, governor of Texas (2015–present)
- Brenna Bird, attorney general of Iowa (2023–present)
- Kris Kobach, attorney general of Kansas (2023–present)
- Steve Marshall, attorney general of Alabama (2017–present)
- John McCuskey, attorney general of West Virginia (2025–present)
- Dan Patrick, lieutenant governor of Texas (2015–present)
- Rick Perry, former governor of Texas (2000–2015)
- Todd Rokita, attorney general of Indiana (2021–present)

Individuals

- Brandon Creighton, chancellor of the Texas Tech University System (2025–present)

Organizations

- U.S. Chamber of Commerce
Nick Tran

U.S. representatives

- Allen West, former FL-22 (2011–2013)

Organizations

- Veterans for America First
Deddrick Wilmer

Newspapers

- Houston Chronicle

==== Fundraising ====
Campaign finance reports as of February 11, 2026
Candidate	Raised	Spent	Cash on hand
Jessica Steinmann (R)	$1,432,342 (Note: $500,000 of this total was self-funded by Steinmann)	$1,003,015	$429,326
Nick Tran (R)	$235,702 (Note: $1,500 of this total was self-funded by Tran)	$195,679	$40,023
Deddrick Wilmer (R)	$46,032	$38,214	$7,817
Source: Federal Election Commission

==== Results ====
Republican primary results
Party	Candidate	Votes	%
Republican	Jessica Steinmann	42,636	68.0
Republican	Brett Jensen (withdrawn)	7,936	12.6
Republican	Nick Tran	7,663	12.2
Republican	Stephen Long	2,069	3.3
Republican	Jay Fondren	1,553	2.5
Republican	Deddrick Wilmer	883	1.4
Total votes		62,740	100.0

=== Democratic primary ===
==== Nominee ====
- Laura Jones, former chair of the San Jacinto County Democratic Party and nominee for this district in 2022 and 2024

==== Eliminated in primary ====
- Keith Coleman, retired USMC officer

==== Endorsements ====
Laura Jones

Organizations

- Houston LGBTQ+ Political Caucus

Newspapers

- Houston Chronicle

==== Fundraising ====
Campaign finance reports as of February 11, 2026
Candidate	Raised	Spent	Cash on hand
Keith Coleman (D)	$11,315	$6,729	$4,586
Laura Jones (D)	$8,910	$7,783	$3,627
Source: Federal Election Commission

==== Results ====
Democratic primary results
Party	Candidate	Votes	%
Democratic	Laura Jones	27,865	65.7
Democratic	Keith Coleman	14,560	34.3
Total votes		42,425	100.0

=== General election ===
==== Predictions ====
Source	Ranking	As of
Decision Desk HQ	Safe R	July 14, 2026
The Cook Political Report	Solid R	February 6, 2025
Inside Elections	Solid R	March 7, 2025
Sabato's Crystal Ball	Safe R	September 18, 2025
Silver Bulletin	Solid R	October 22, 2026

==== Fundraising ====
Campaign finance reports as of September 30, 2026
Candidate	Raised	Spent	Cash on hand
Jessica Steinmann (R)	$2,366,299	$2,149,365	$216,934
Laura Jones (D)	$29,899	$26,830	$5,570
Source: Federal Election Commission

==== Results ====
2026 Texas's 8th congressional district election
Party	Candidate	Votes	%	±%
Republican	Jessica Steinmann			
Democratic	Laura Jones			
Total votes				

== District 9 ==
2026 Texas's 9th congressional district election

Nominee	Leticia Gutierrez	Alex Mealer
Party	Democratic	Republican
Popular vote	98,079	72,340
Percentage	57.6%	42.4%
U.S. Representative before election
None
(New seat)
Elected U.S. Representative
Leticia Gutierrez
Democratic

Texas's 9th congressional district boundary from the 2026 elections Interactive map version

The new 9th district, which previously encompassed southern portions of Houston and such suburbs as Missouri City and was represented by incumbent Democrat Al Green, has been relocated to the eastern portions of the Houston area as a result of redistricting; Green ran for reelection in the newly redrawn 18th district.

The new district, which has a 58.6% Hispanic voting age population, covers such east and southeast Houston neighborhoods as Denver Harbor, Magnolia Park, Park Place and Edgebrook, as well as most of the suburbs of Pasadena, Baytown, Deer Park, La Porte, Galena Park, Channelview and Crosby, and exurban Liberty County including Cleveland, Liberty and Dayton. Donald Trump carried the district in all three of his elections - a 49.8% plurality in 2016, 53.7% in 2020, and 59.5% in 2024, and the district also gave Ted Cruz 54.4% of the vote in 2024.

However, the election would go to Gutierrez by 15.2 points, in what was considered an upset.

=== Democratic primary ===
==== Nominee ====
- Leticia Gutierrez, environmental justice advocate

==== Eliminated in primary ====
- Earnest Clayton, public health professional
- Peter Filler, teacher and nominee for the 2nd district in 2024
- Todd Ivey, physician
- Marty Rocha, deputy sheriff and nominee for Texas's 28th House of Representatives district in 2024
- Terry Virts, retired United States Air Force pilot and NASA astronaut (previously ran for U.S. Senate)

==== Endorsements ====
Earnest Clayton

Organizations

- Houston LGBTQ+ Political Caucus
Todd Ivey

Labor unions

- Texas AFL-CIO
Terry Virts

U.S. representatives

- Adam Kinzinger, former IL-11 (2011–2023) (Republican)

Newspapers

- Houston Chronicle

==== Fundraising ====
Campaign finance reports as of February 11, 2026
Candidate	Raised	Spent	Cash on hand
Peter Filler (D)	$4,143	$4,002	$198
Leticia Gutierrez (D)	$18,423 (Note: $500 of this total was self-funded by Gutierrez)	$10,111	$8,311
Todd Ivey (D)	$168,026	$72,713	$95,312
Terry Virts (D)	$621,046 (Note: $53,125 of this total was self-funded by Virts)	$576,157	$44,888
Source: Federal Election Commission

==== Polling ====
Poll source	Date(s) administered	Sample size	Margin of error	Earnest Clayton	Peter Filler	Leticia Gutierrez	Todd Ivey	Marty Rocha	Terry Virts	Undecided
University of Houston	February 3–10, 2026	400 (LV)	± 4.9%	5%	1%	24%	2%	2%	5%	61%

==== Results ====
Democratic primary results
Party	Candidate	Votes	%
Democratic	Leticia Gutierrez	18,703	53.6
Democratic	Earnest Clayton	5,673	16.3
Democratic	Terry Virts	5,095	14.6
Democratic	Todd Ivey	2,462	7.1
Democratic	Marty Rocha	2,374	6.8
Democratic	Peter Filler	558	1.6
Total votes		34,865	100.0

=== Republican primary ===
==== Nominee ====
- Alex Mealer, METRO board member and nominee for Harris County judge in 2022 who moved districts in order to run in the newly gerrymandered Texas 9th district

==== Eliminated in runoff ====
- Briscoe Cain, state representative from the 128th district (2017–present)

==== Eliminated in primary ====
- Jaimy Blanco, real estate investor
- Michael Curran, professor
- Crystal DeLeon-Sarmiento, Manvel city councilor
- Dan Mims, San Jacinto College trustee
- Steve Stockman, former U.S. representative from the 36th district (2013–2015) and this district (1995–1997) and candidate for U.S. Senate in 2014
- Terry Thain, railcar terminal operations manager

==== Withdrawn ====
- Alexandria Butler, businesswoman (running for state house)
- Mayra Guillén, nonprofit founder and sister of Vanessa Guillén
- Dwayne Stovall, business owner and candidate for U.S. Senate in 2020 (endorsed Mims, remained on ballot)
- Deddrick Wilmer, mortage broker (ran in the 8th district)

==== Endorsements ====
Briscoe Cain

U.S. representatives

- Tom DeLay, former House majority leader (2003–2005) from TX-22 (1985–2006)
- Lance Gooden, TX-05 (2019–present)
- Kent Hance, former TX-19 (1979-1985)
- Kenny Marchant, former TX-24 (2005–2021)
- Bob McEwen, former OH-06 (1981–1993)
- Troy Nehls, TX-22 (2021–present)
- Pete Sessions, TX-17 (1997–2019, 2021–present)
- Van Taylor, former TX-03 (2019–2023)
- Randy Weber, TX-14 (2013–present)

Statewide officials

- Greg Abbott, governor of Texas (2015–present)
- Dawn Buckingham, land commissioner of Texas (2023–present)
- Wayne Christian, railroad commissioner of Texas (2017–present)
- Jim Wright, railroad commissioner of Texas (2021–present)

State legislators

- 34 state representatives (Note: Daniel Alders, state representative from the 4th district (2025–present); Ernest Bailes, former state representative from the 18th district (2017–2025); Cecil Bell Jr., state representative from the 3rd district (2013–present); Ben Bumgarner, state representative from the 63rd district (2023–present); David Cook, state representative from the 96th district (2021–present); Charles Cunningham, state representative from the 127th district (2023–present); Stan Gerdes, state representative from the 17th district (2025–present); Ryan Guillen, state representative from the 31st district (2003–present); Cody Harris, state representative from the 8th district (2019–present); Richard Hayes, state representative from the 57th district (2023–present); Janis Holt, state representative from the 18th district (2025–present); Andy Hopper, state representative from the 64th district (2025–present); Carrie Isaac, state representative from the 73rd district (2023–present); Helen Kerwin, state representative from the 58th district (2025–present); Mitch Little, state representative from the 65th district (2025–present); Janie Lopez, state representative from the 37th district (2023–present); José Manuel Lozano, state representative from the 43rd district (2011–present); AJ Louderback, state representative from the 30th district (2025–present); Shelley Luther, state representative from the 62nd district (2025–present); Don McLaughlin, state representative from the 80th district (2025–present); Will Metcalf, state representative from the 16th district (2014–present); Brent Money, state representative from the 2nd district (2025–present); Mike Olcott, state representative from the 60th district (2025–present); Tom Oliverson, majority leader of the Texas House of Representatives (2024–present) from the 130th district (2017–present); Dennis Paul, state representative from the 129th district (2015–present); Keresa Richardson, state representative from the 61st district (2025–present); Nate Schatzline, state representative from the 93rd district (2023–present); Mike Schofield, state representative from the 132nd district (2015–2019, 2021–present); Alan Schoolcraft, state representative from the 44th district (2025–present); Joanne Shofner, state representative from the 11th district (2025–present); Valoree Swanson, state representative from the 150th district (2017–present); Ellen Troxclair, state representative from the 19th district (2023–present); Cody Vasut, state representative from the 25th district (2021–present); Wesley Virdell, state representative from the 53rd district (2025–present))

Local officials

- Robert Eckels, former Harris County judge (1995–2007)

Party officials

- Cathie Adams, former chair of the Texas Republican Party (2009–2010)
- James Dickey, former chair of the Texas Republican Party (2017–2020)
- Matt Rinaldi, former chair of the Texas Republican Party (2021–2024)

Individuals

- Abby Johnson, activist
- Troy Newman, president of Operation Rescue
- Frank Pavone, director of Priests for Life

Labor unions

- Baytown Professional Firefighters Association

Organizations

- Concerned Women for America
- Gun Owners of America
- NRA Political Victory Fund
- Students for Life of America
- Texas Gun Rights
- Texas Right to Life PAC

Newspapers

- Houston Chronicle
Alex Mealer

Executive branch officials

- Donald Trump, president of the United States (2017–2021, 2025–present)

U.S. representatives

- Brian Babin, TX-36 (2015–present)
- Tom Emmer, House majority whip (2023–present) from MN–08 (2015–present)
- Jim Jordan, OH-04 (2007–present)
- David McIntosh, former IN-02 (1995–2001)
- Steve Scalise, House majority leader (2023–present) from LA-01 (2008–present)

Individuals

- Jim McIngvale, businessman

Labor unions

- Baytown Municipal Police Association
- Deer Park Police Association
- Houston Police Retired Officers Association
- Pasadena Police Officer's Union

Organizations

- Club for Growth
- Maggie's List
- With Honor Fund
Dan Mims

Individuals

- Dwayne Stovall, business owner and former candidate for this district

==== Fundraising ====
Campaign finance reports as of February 11, 2026
Candidate	Raised	Spent	Cash on hand
Jaimy Blanco (R)	$112,048	$109,941	$3,125
Briscoe Cain (R)	$430,919 (Note: $100,000 of this total was self-funded by Cain.)	$273,639	$157,280
Alex Mealer (R)	$1,224,831	$752,647	$472,183
Dan Mims (R)	$353,414 (Note: $300,000 of this total was self-funded by Mims.)	$283,052	$70,361
Crystal Sarmiento (R)	$78,009 (Note: $12,000 of this total was self-funded by Sarmiento.)	$48,281	$29,727
Steve Stockman (R)	$180,608 (Note: $153,932 of this total was self-funded by Stockman.)	$151,816	$28,791
Terry Thain (R)	$5,250 (Note: $5,200 of this total was self-funded by Thain.)	$3,397	$1,858
Source: Federal Election Commission

==== Polling ====
Poll source	Date(s) administered	Sample size	Margin of error	Briscoe Cain	Alex Mealer	Dan Mims	Steve Stockman	Other	Undecided
Pulse Decision Science (R) (Note: Poll sponsored by Club for Growth, which has endorsed Mealer's campaign)	February 9–11, 2026	400 (LV)	± 4.9%	25%	29%	6%	6%	9% (Note: Stovall with 3%; Others with 6%)	25%
University of Houston	February 3–10, 2026	400 (LV)	± 4.9%	26%	34%	10%	4%	7% (Note: Stovall with 4%; "Other Four Candidates Combined" with 3%)	19%
Pulse Decision Science (R)	December 15–17, 2025	400 (LV)	± 4.9%	25%	19%	2%	6%	17% (Note: Stovall with 3%; "Other Four Candidates Combined" with 14%)	31%
McLaughlin & Associates (R) (Note: Poll sponsored by Cain's campaign)	October 21–23, 2025	400 (LV)	± 4.9%	37%	16%	3%	–	5% (Note: Stovall with 3%; Butler and Van Emmert with 1%; Wilmer with 0%)	40%

==== Results ====
Republican primary results
Party	Candidate	Votes	%
Republican	Alex Mealer	11,343	35.8
Republican	Briscoe Cain	9,886	31.2
Republican	Steve Stockman	5,196	16.4
Republican	Dan Mims	2,608	8.2
Republican	Crystal DeLeon-Sarmiento	788	2.5
Republican	Dwayne Stovall (withdrawn)	724	2.3
Republican	Jaimy Blanco	498	1.6
Republican	Michael Curran	351	1.1
Republican	Terry Thain	291	0.9
Total votes		31,685	100.0

==== Runoff polling ====
Poll source	Date(s) administered	Sample size	Margin of error	Briscoe Cain	Alex Mealer	Undecided
University of Houston	May 5–9, 2026	400 (LV)	± 4.9%	41%	50%	9%

==== Runoff results ====
Republican primary runoff results
Party	Candidate	Votes	%
Republican	Alex Mealer	15,625	68.3
Republican	Briscoe Cain	7,257	31.7
Total votes		22,882	100.0

=== Independents ===
==== Filed paperwork ====
- Roy Morales, retired USAF lieutenant colonel

=== General election ===
==== Predictions ====
Source	Ranking	As of
Decision Desk HQ	Likely R (flip)	July 14, 2026
The Cook Political Report	Likely R (flip)	September 25, 2026
Inside Elections	Lean R (flip)	October 29, 2026
Sabato's Crystal Ball	Likely R (flip)	September 22, 2026
Silver Bulletin	Likely R (flip)	October 22, 2026

==== Fundraising ====
Campaign finance reports as of September 30, 2026
Candidate	Raised	Spent	Cash on hand
Leticia Gutierrez (D)	$152,003	$59,037	$92,966
Alex Mealer (R)	$2,676,806	$2,197,456	$479,350
Source: Federal Election Commission

==== Polling ====
Poll source	Date(s) administered	Sample size	Margin of error	Leticia Gutierrez (D)	Alex Mealer (R)	Undecided
DCCC	October 20–22, 2026	490 (LV)	± 4.4%	47%	48%	5%
University of Houston	October 3–7, 2026	677 (LV)	± 3.8%	42%	48%	10%
Public Policy Polling (D) (Note: Poll sponsored by Gutierrez's campaign)	September 18–19, 2026	—	—	39%	45%	16%

==== Results ====
2026 Texas's 9th congressional district election
Party	Candidate	Votes	%	±%
Democratic	Leticia Gutierrez	98,079	57.6	
Republican	Alex Mealer	72,340	42.4	
Total votes		170,419	100.0	
Democratic win (new seat)				

== District 10 ==
2026 Texas's 10th congressional district election
Nominee	Chris Gober	Caitlin Rourk
Party	Republican	Democratic
Popular vote	161,425	138,832
Percentage	53.8%	46.2%
U.S. Representative before election
Michael McCaul
Republican
Elected U.S. Representative
Chris Gober
Republican

Texas's 10th congressional district boundary from the 2026 elections Interactive map version

The incumbent is Republican Michael McCaul, who was re-elected in 2024 with 63.6% of the vote. McCaul is not seeking reelection. The district was redrawn during Texas's 2025 mid-decade congressional redistricting, which gave 60.5% of the vote to Donald Trump and 58.4% to Ted Cruz in 2024.

The new 10th district stretches from downtown and western Austin (including Lake Travis) through the Bryan–College Station area to a rural stretch of east-central Texas between Houston, Dallas and Tyler, including Crockett, Livingston and Madisonville.

=== Republican primary ===
==== Nominee ====
- Chris Gober, political-law attorney and former director and chief lawyer of Elon Musk's America PAC

==== Eliminated in primary ====
- Rob Altman, U.S. Army veteran
- Ben Bius, businessman, candidate for Texas's 12th House of Representatives district in 2022 and 2024, and nominee in 2000
- Rob Brown, pastor (previously ran in the 17th district)
- Brandon Hawbraker, software engineer
- Jessica Karlsruher, lobbyist (previously filed to run in the 21st district)
- Kara King, mayor of Bee Cave
- Scott MacLeod, U.S. Army veteran
- Jenny Garcia Sharon, volunteer caregiver
- Jeremy Story, minister

==== Withdrawn ====
- Philip Suarez, realtor

==== Declined ====
- Michael McCaul, incumbent U.S. representative

==== Endorsements ====
Rob Altman

Newspapers

- Austin American-Statesman
Chris Gober

Executive branch officials

- Donald Trump, president of the United States (2017–2021, 2025–present)

U.S. senators

- Ted Cruz, Texas (2013–present)

U.S. representatives

- Tom Emmer, House majority whip (2023–present) from MN-08 (2015–present)
- Mike Johnson, speaker of the House (2023–present) from LA-04 (2017–present)
- Jim Jordan, OH-04 (2007–present)
- Michael McCaul, TX-10 (2005–present)
- David McIntosh, former IN-02 (1995–2001)
- Steve Scalise, House majority leader (2023–present) from LA-01 (2008–present)

Statewide officials

- Greg Abbott, governor of Texas (2015–present)

Organizations

- Club for Growth
- Leading the Future
- Turning Point Action
Jessica Karlsruher

Organizations

- Maggie's List

==== Fundraising ====
Campaign finance reports as of February 11, 2026
Candidate	Raised	Spent	Cash on hand
Rob Altman (R)	$193,487 (Note: $175,000 of this total was self-funded by Altman)	$35,004	$158,483
Ben Bius (R)	$459,535 (Note: $428,750 of this total was self-funded by Bius)	$49,114	$299,483
Rob Brown (R)	$7,753	$6,302	$1,307
Chris Gober (R)	$1,151,762 (Note: $500,000 of this total was self-funded by Gober)	$1,047,102	$104,660
Brandon Hawbraker (R)	$6,702 (Note: $4,587 of this total was self-funded by Hawbraker)	$6,286	$416
Jessica Karlsruher (R)	$165,533 (Note: $9,911 of this total was self-funded by Karlsruher)	$106,081	$59,452
Kara King (R)	$230,097 (Note: $100,000 of this total was self-funded by King)	$70,414	$159,683
Scott MacLeod (R)	$166,390 (Note: $106,000 of this total was self-funded by MacLeod)	$87,096	$79,294.
Jenny Garcia Sharon (R)	$19,272 (Note: $17,000 of this total was self-funded by Sharon)	$10,216	$9,055
Jeremy Story (R)	$25,624 (Note: $5,674 of this total was self-funded by Story)	$10,065	$15,559
Source: Federal Election Commission

==== Results ====
Republican primary results
Party	Candidate	Votes	%
Republican	Chris Gober	38,541	51.2
Republican	Ben Bius	10,507	14.0
Republican	Rob Altman	5,660	7.5
Republican	Jessica Karlsruher	5,352	7.1
Republican	Scott MacLeod	5,051	6.7
Republican	Jeremy Story	3,401	4.5
Republican	Kara King	2,147	2.9
Republican	Jenny Garcia Sharon	1,790	2.4
Republican	Rob Brown	1,778	2.4
Republican	Brandon Hawbraker	977	1.3
Total votes		75,204	100.0

=== Democratic primary ===
==== Nominee ====
- Caitlin Rourk grew up near Washington, D.C., as the daughter of two public school teachers. She served as an intelligence officer in the Texas Army National Guard and U.S. Army Reserve, participating in full-time missions supporting disaster response, border operations, and public health programs. Early in her career, Rourk engaged in bipartisan public policy work focused on deficit reduction and energy security, later leading corporate communications at Dell Technologies. A resident of Central Texas for over a decade, she lives in the Eanes Independent School District, where her children attend public school.

==== Eliminated in primary ====
- Dawn Marshall, college professor
- Bernie Reyna, veterinary professional

==== Withdrawn ====
- Sarah Eckhardt, state senator from the 14th district (2020–present) (running for comptroller of public accounts)

==== Endorsements ====
Caitlin Rourk

Organizations

- National Women's Political Caucus
- League of Independent Voters

Political parties

- Texas Forward Party

Labor unions

- Texas AFL-CIO
- Texas AFT

Newspapers

- Austin American-Statesman
- The Austin Chronicle

==== Voter-guide recommendations ====
Bernie Reyna

- McCallum Young Democratic Socialists of America — recommended Reyna for Texas's 10th congressional district in its 2026 Travis County Democratic primary student voter guide.

==== Fundraising ====
Campaign finance reports as of February 11, 2026
Candidate	Raised	Spent	Cash on hand
Dawn Marshall (D)	$11,466	$10,271	$1,195
Bernardo Reyna (D)	$3,182 (Note: $3,125 of this total was self-funded by Reyna)	$3,239	$0
Caitlin Rourk (D)	$179,189	$168,204	$10,984
Source: Federal Election Commission

==== Results ====
Democratic primary results
Party	Candidate	Votes	%
Democratic	Caitlin Rourk	32,716	60.8
Democratic	Dawn Marshall	12,184	22.6
Democratic	Bernardo Reyna	8,893	16.5
Total votes		53,793	100.0

=== General election ===
==== Predictions ====
Source	Ranking	As of
Decision Desk HQ	Likely R	September 25, 2026
The Cook Political Report	Solid R	February 6, 2025
Inside Elections	Solid R	March 7, 2025
Sabato's Crystal Ball	Safe R	September 18, 2025
Silver Bulletin	Solid R	October 22, 2026

==== Post-Primary endorsements ====
Caitlin Rourk (D)

Political parties

- Forward Party

==== Polling ====
Poll source	Date(s) administered	Sample size	Margin of error	Chris Gober (R)	Caitlin Rourk (D)	Undecided
Change Research (Note: Poll sponsored by Rourk's campaign)	September 18–22, 2026	613 (LV)	± 4.3%	48%	41%	11%

==== Fundraising ====
Campaign finance reports as of April 28, 2026
Candidate	Raised	Spent	Cash on hand
Chris Gober (R)	$2,271,919	$2,009,119	$262,800
Caitlin Rourk (D)	$243,994	$188,134	$55,860
Source: Federal Election Commission

==== Results ====
2026 Texas's 10th congressional district election
Party	Candidate	Votes	%	±%
Republican	Chris Gober			
Democratic	Caitlin Rourk			
Total votes				

== District 11 ==
2026 Texas's 11th congressional district election
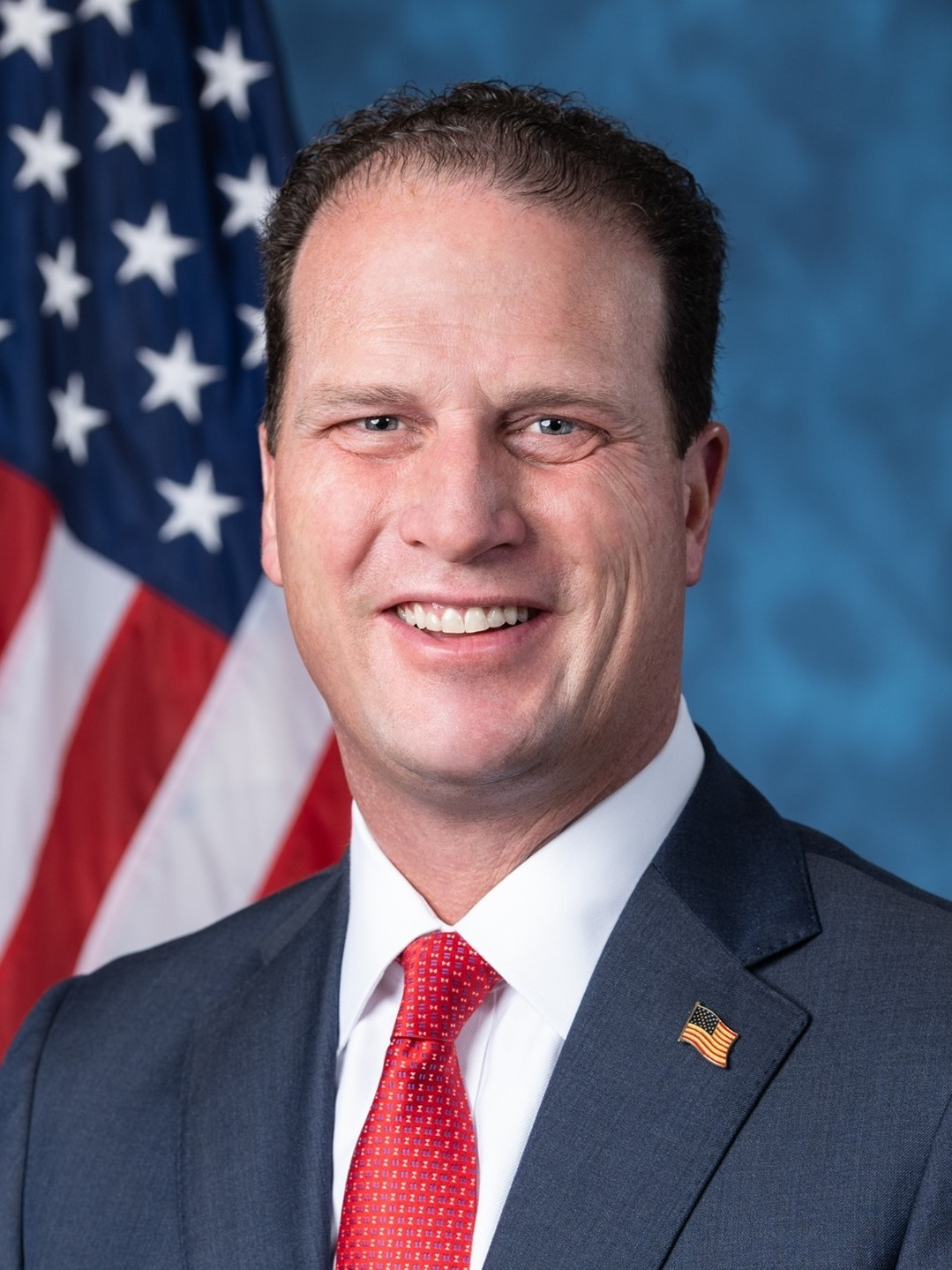

Nominee	August Pfluger	Claire Reynolds
Party	Republican	Democratic
Popular vote	138,627	94,353
Percentage	59.5%	40.5%
U.S. Representative before election
August Pfluger
Republican
Elected U.S. Representative
August Pfluger
Republican

Texas's 11th congressional district boundary from the 2026 elections Interactive map version

The new 11th district is based in midwestern Texas, including Midland, Odessa, San Angelo and Brownwood, and also includes a thin stretch of the Austin area along the Travis and Williamson county lines including Pflugerville and Horseshoe Bay. The incumbent is Republican August Pfluger, who was re-elected unopposed in 2024. The majority White district has a voting age population that is 35.3% Hispanic, and in 2024 gave Donald Trump 66.5% of the vote and Ted Cruz 64%.

=== Republican primary ===
==== Nominee ====
- August Pfluger, incumbent U.S. representative

==== Endorsements ====
August Pfluger

Executive branch officials

- Donald Trump, 45th and 47th president of the United States (2017–2021, 2025–present)

Statewide officials

- Greg Abbott, governor of Texas (2015–present)

Organizations

- AIPAC

==== Fundraising ====
Campaign finance reports as of February 11, 2026
Candidate	Raised	Spent	Cash on hand
August Pfluger (R)	$2,221,032	$1,854,062	$2,691,075
Source: Federal Election Commission

==== Results ====
Republican primary results
Party	Candidate	Votes	%
Republican	August Pfluger (incumbent)	59,885	100.0
Total votes		59,885	100.0

=== Democratic primary ===
==== Nominee ====
- Claire Reynolds, attorney

==== Eliminated in primary ====
- Pedro Ruiz, mental health counselor and U.S. Marine Corps veteran

==== Endorsements ====
Pedro Ruiz

Newspapers

- Austin American-Statesman
- The Austin Chronicle

==== Fundraising ====
Campaign finance reports as of February 11, 2026
Candidate	Raised	Spent	Cash on hand
Claire Reynolds (D)	$29,741	$19,246	$10,494
Source: Federal Election Commission

==== Results ====
Democratic primary results
Party	Candidate	Votes	%
Democratic	Claire Reynolds	21,787	57.6
Democratic	Pedro Ruiz	16,054	42.4
Total votes		37,841	100.0

=== General election ===
==== Predictions ====
Source	Ranking	As of
Decision Desk HQ	Safe R	July 14, 2026
The Cook Political Report	Solid R	February 6, 2025
Inside Elections	Solid R	March 7, 2025
Sabato's Crystal Ball	Safe R	September 18, 2025
Silver Bulletin	Solid R	October 22, 2026

==== Fundraising ====
Campaign finance reports as of April 28, 2026
Candidate	Raised	Spent	Cash on hand
August Pfluger (R)	$2,649,050	$2,201,577	$2,771,579
Claire Reynolds (D)	$42,201	$31,165	$11,036
Source: Federal Election Commission

==== Results ====
2026 Texas's 11th congressional district election
Party	Candidate	Votes	%	±%
Republican	August Pfluger (incumbent)			
Democratic	Claire Reynolds			
Total votes				

== District 12 ==
2026 Texas's 12th congressional district election
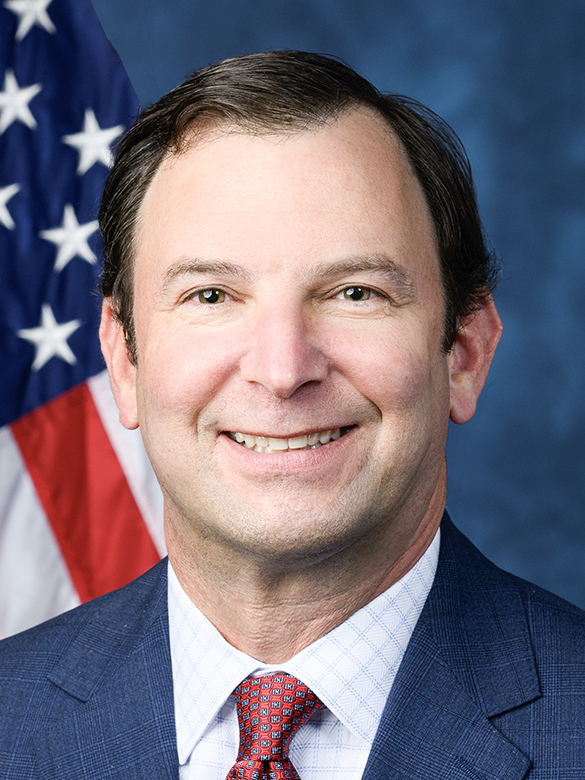

Nominee	Craig Goldman	Angela Rodriguez Prilliman
Party	Republican	Democratic
Popular vote	144,438	127,456
Percentage	53.1%	46.9%
U.S. Representative before election
Craig Goldman
Republican
Elected U.S. Representative
Craig Goldman
Republican

Texas's 12th congressional district boundary from the 2026 elections Interactive map version

The new 12th district is in the western part of the Dallas–Fort Worth metroplex, and takes in most of Parker County and western Tarrant County, including most of the western half of Fort Worth and such inner suburbs as Benbrook, Saginaw, and Haltom City, as well as Weatherford in Parker County. The incumbent is Republican Craig Goldman, who was elected with 63.5% of the vote in 2024. Donald Trump won 61.3% and Ted Cruz 57.9% in 2024.

=== Republican primary ===
==== Nominee ====
- Craig Goldman, incumbent U.S. representative

==== Endorsements ====
Craig Goldman

Executive branch officials

- Donald Trump, president of the United States (2017–2021, 2025–present)

Statewide officials

- Greg Abbott, governor of Texas (2015–present)

Organizations

- AIPAC
- Republican Jewish Coalition

==== Fundraising ====
Campaign finance reports as of February 11, 2026
Candidate	Raised	Spent	Cash on hand
Craig Goldman (R)	$1,046,254	$612,576	$969,575
Source: Federal Election Commission

==== Results ====
Republican primary results
Party	Candidate	Votes	%
Republican	Craig Goldman (incumbent)	54,931	100.0
Total votes		54,931	100.0

=== Democratic primary ===
==== Nominee ====
- Angela Rodriguez Prilliman, entrepreneur

==== Eliminated in primary ====
- Kenneth Morgan-Aguilera, nonprofit executive director and U.S. Army veteran

==== Endorsements ====
Kenneth Morgan-Aguilera

Newspapers

- Fort Worth Star-Telegram

==== Fundraising ====
Campaign finance reports as of February 11, 2026
Candidate	Raised	Spent	Cash on hand
Kenneth Morgan-Aguilera (D)	$10,350	$10,056	$0
Source: Federal Election Commission

==== Results ====
Democratic primary results
Party	Candidate	Votes	%
Democratic	Angela Rodriguez Prilliman	30,878	59.8
Democratic	Kenneth Morgan-Aguilera	20,770	40.2
Total votes		51,648	100.0

=== General election ===
==== Predictions ====
Source	Ranking	As of
Decision Desk HQ	Safe R	July 14, 2026
The Cook Political Report	Solid R	February 6, 2025
Inside Elections	Solid R	March 7, 2025
Sabato's Crystal Ball	Safe R	September 18, 2025
Silver Bulletin	Solid R	October 22, 2026

==== Fundraising ====
Campaign finance reports as of April 28, 2026
Candidate	Raised	Spent	Cash on hand
Craig Goldman (R)	$1,516,552	$659,713	$1,392,735
Angela Rodriguez Prilliman (D)	$0	$0	$0
Source: Federal Election Commission

==== Results ====
2026 Texas's 12th congressional district election
Party	Candidate	Votes	%	±%
Republican	Craig Goldman (incumbent)			
Democratic	Angela Rodriguez Prilliman			
Total votes				

== District 13 ==
2026 Texas's 13th congressional district election
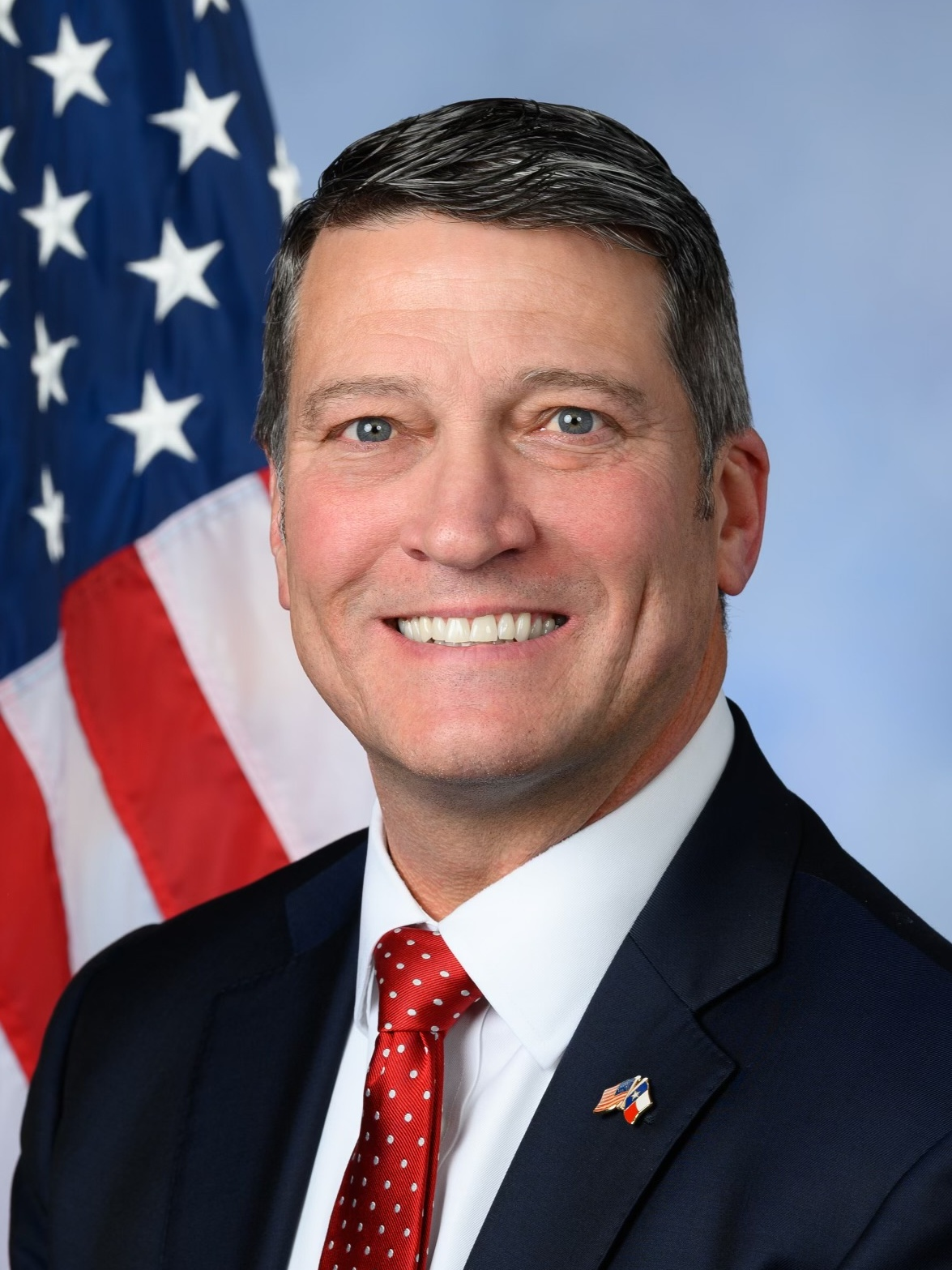

Nominee	Ronny Jackson	Mark Nair
Party	Republican	Democratic
Popular vote	158,134	84,197
Percentage	65.3%	34.7%
U.S. Representative before election
Ronny Jackson
Republican
Elected U.S. Representative
Ronny Jackson
Republican

Texas's 13th congressional district boundary from the 2026 elections Interactive map version

The new 13th district encompasses most of the Texas Panhandle and the western part of the Texoma region, containing the cities of Amarillo and Wichita Falls, as well as the college town of Denton in Denton County. The incumbent is Republican Ronny Jackson, who was re-elected unopposed in 2024. Donald Trump won 72.5% of the vote and Ted Cruz 70.3% in this district.

=== Republican primary ===
==== Nominee ====
- Ronny Jackson, incumbent U.S. representative

==== Eliminated in primary ====
- Chasity Wedgeworth, business owner

==== Endorsements ====
Ronny Jackson

Executive branch officials

- Donald Trump, 45th and 47th president of the United States (2017–2021, 2025–present)

Statewide officials

- Greg Abbott, governor of Texas (2015–present)

Organizations

- AIPAC

==== Fundraising ====
Campaign finance reports as of February 11, 2026
Candidate	Raised	Spent	Cash on hand
Ronny Jackson (R)	$2,549,763	$1,311,886	$4,639,824
Source: Federal Election Commission

==== Results ====
Republican primary results
Party	Candidate	Votes	%
Republican	Ronny Jackson (incumbent)	71,554	89.5
Republican	Chasity Wedgeworth	8,414	10.5
Total votes		79,968	100.0

=== Democratic primary ===
==== Nominee ====
- Mark Nair, former Amarillo city councilor

==== Endorsements ====
Mark Nair

Labor unions

- Texas AFL-CIO

==== Fundraising ====
Campaign finance reports as of February 11, 2026
Candidate	Raised	Spent	Cash on hand
Mark Nair (D)	$29,816	$23,824	$6,092
Source: Federal Election Commission

==== Results ====
Democratic primary results
Party	Candidate	Votes	%
Democratic	Mark Nair	28,198	100.0
Total votes		28,198	100.0

=== General election ===
==== Predictions ====
Source	Ranking	As of
Decision Desk HQ	Safe R	July 14, 2026
The Cook Political Report	Solid R	February 6, 2025
Inside Elections	Solid R	March 7, 2025
Sabato's Crystal Ball	Safe R	September 18, 2025
Silver Bulletin	Solid R	October 22, 2026

==== Fundraising ====
Campaign finance reports as of April 28, 2026
Candidate	Raised	Spent	Cash on hand
Ronny Jackson (R)	$2,792,675	$1,515,301	$4,679,322
Mark Nair (D)	$48,606	$44,605	$4,100
Source: Federal Election Commission

==== Results ====
2026 Texas's 13th congressional district election
Party	Candidate	Votes	%	±%
Republican	Ronny Jackson (incumbent)			
Democratic	Mark Nair			
Total votes				

== District 14 ==
2026 Texas's 14th congressional district election
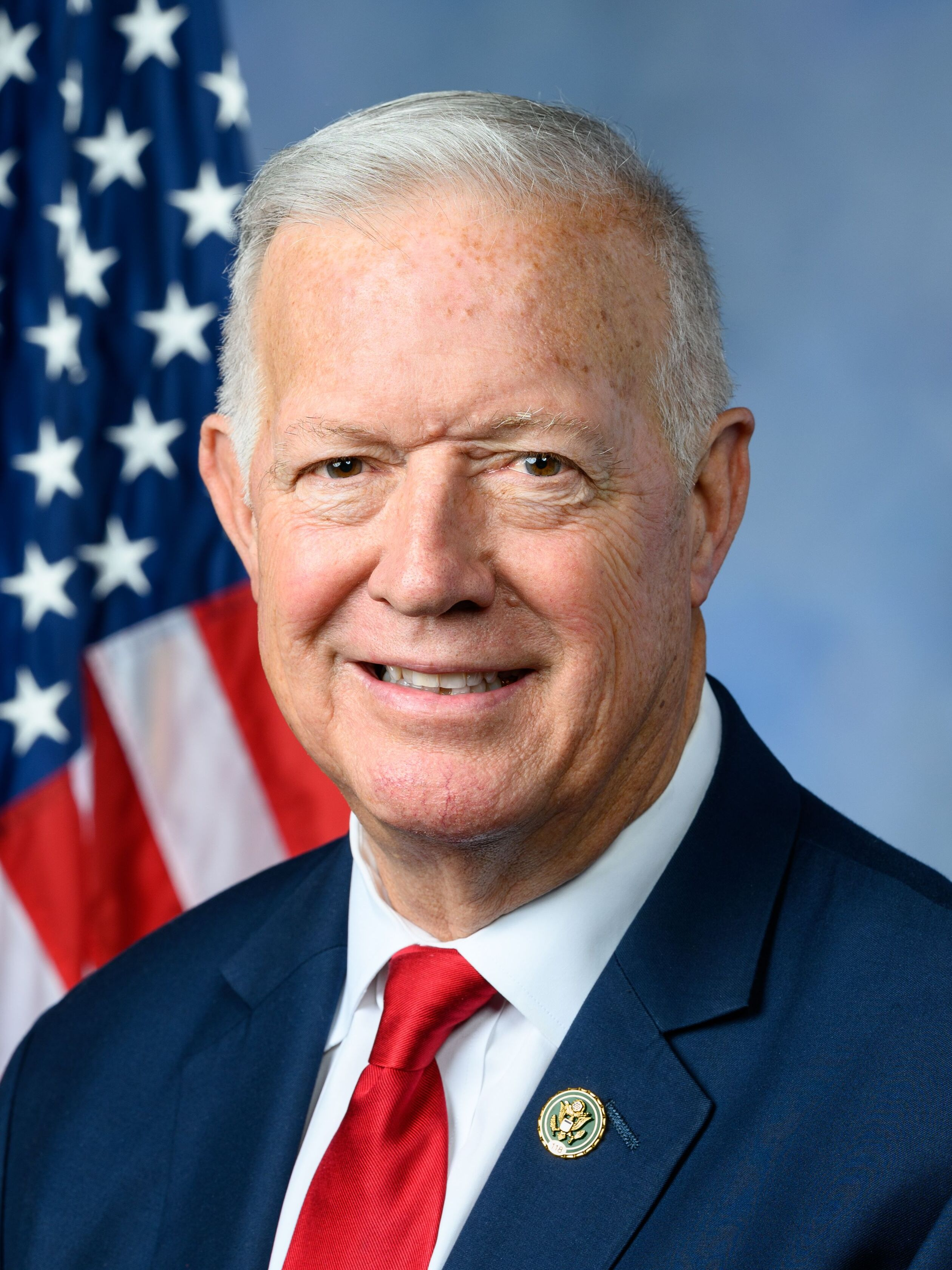

Nominee	Randy Weber	Thurman Bartie
Party	Republican	Democratic
Popular vote	152,619	129,934
Percentage	54%	46%
U.S. Representative before election
Randy Weber
Republican
Elected U.S. Representative
Randy Weber
Republican

Texas's 14th congressional district boundary from the 2026 elections Interactive map version

The new 14th district remains anchored in Galveston County in the southeast corner of Greater Houston, including Galveston, League City, Friendswood and Texas City, and also now extends westward to Manvel and Alvin in north central Brazoria County and southern Missouri City in Fort Bend County, as well east across Bolivar Peninsula to Port Arthur and Orange in the Golden Triangle area. The incumbent is Republican Randy Weber, who was re-elected with 68.7% of the vote in 2024. Donald Trump won 61.5 percent of the vote and Ted Cruz 58.6 in this district in 2024.

=== Republican primary ===
==== Nominee ====
- Randy Weber, incumbent U.S. representative

==== Eliminated in primary ====
- Jessica Forgy, preschool teacher

==== Endorsements ====
Randy Weber

Executive branch officials

- Donald Trump, 45th and 47th president of the United States (2017–2021, 2025–present)

Statewide officials

- Greg Abbott, governor of Texas (2015–present)

Organizations

- AIPAC
- Turning Point Action

==== Fundraising ====
Campaign finance reports as of February 11, 2026
Candidate	Raised	Spent	Cash on hand
Jessica Forgy (R) (Note: Has not filed since Q1 2025)	$3,000	$380	$3,619
Randy Weber (R)	$703,866	$371,818	$952,620
Source: Federal Election Commission

==== Results ====
Republican primary results
Party	Candidate	Votes	%
Republican	Randy Weber (incumbent)	55,800	88.6
Republican	Jessica Forgy	7,215	11.4
Total votes		63,015	100.0

=== Democratic primary ===
==== Nominee ====
- Thurman Bartie, former mayor of Port Arthur

==== Eliminated in runoff ====
- Richard Davis, small business owner

==== Eliminated in primary ====
- Konstantinos Vogiatzis, certified public accountant

==== Endorsements ====
Konstantinos Vogiatzis

Organizations

- Houston LGBTQ+ Political Caucus

==== Fundraising ====
Campaign finance reports as of February 11, 2026
Candidate	Raised	Spent	Cash on hand
Konstantinos Vogiatzis (D)	$12,879 (Note: $10,784 of this total was self-funded by Vogiatzis)	$9,052	$2,095
Source: Federal Election Commission

==== Results ====
Democratic primary results
Party	Candidate	Votes	%
Democratic	Richard Davis	22,705	44.3
Democratic	Thurman Bartie	16,015	31.3
Democratic	Konstantinos Vogiatzis	12,514	24.4
Total votes		51,234	100.0

==== Runoff results ====
Democratic primary runoff results
Party	Candidate	Votes	%
Democratic	Thurman Bartie	7,148	51.0
Democratic	Richard Davis	6,881	49.0
Total votes		14,029	100.0

=== General election ===
==== Predictions ====
Source	Ranking	As of
Decision Desk HQ	Safe R	July 14, 2026
The Cook Political Report	Solid R	February 6, 2025
Inside Elections	Solid R	March 7, 2025
Sabato's Crystal Ball	Safe R	September 18, 2025
Silver Bulletin	Solid R	October 22, 2026

==== Fundraising ====
Campaign finance reports as of April 28, 2026
Candidate	Raised	Spent	Cash on hand
Randy Weber (R)	$824,082	$576,878	$876,776
Thurman Bartie (D)	$14,423	$13,016	$957
Source: Federal Election Commission

==== Results ====
2026 Texas's 14th congressional district election
Party	Candidate	Votes	%	±%
Republican	Randy Weber (incumbent)			
Democratic	Thurman Bartie			
Total votes				

== District 15 ==
2026 Texas's 15th congressional district election
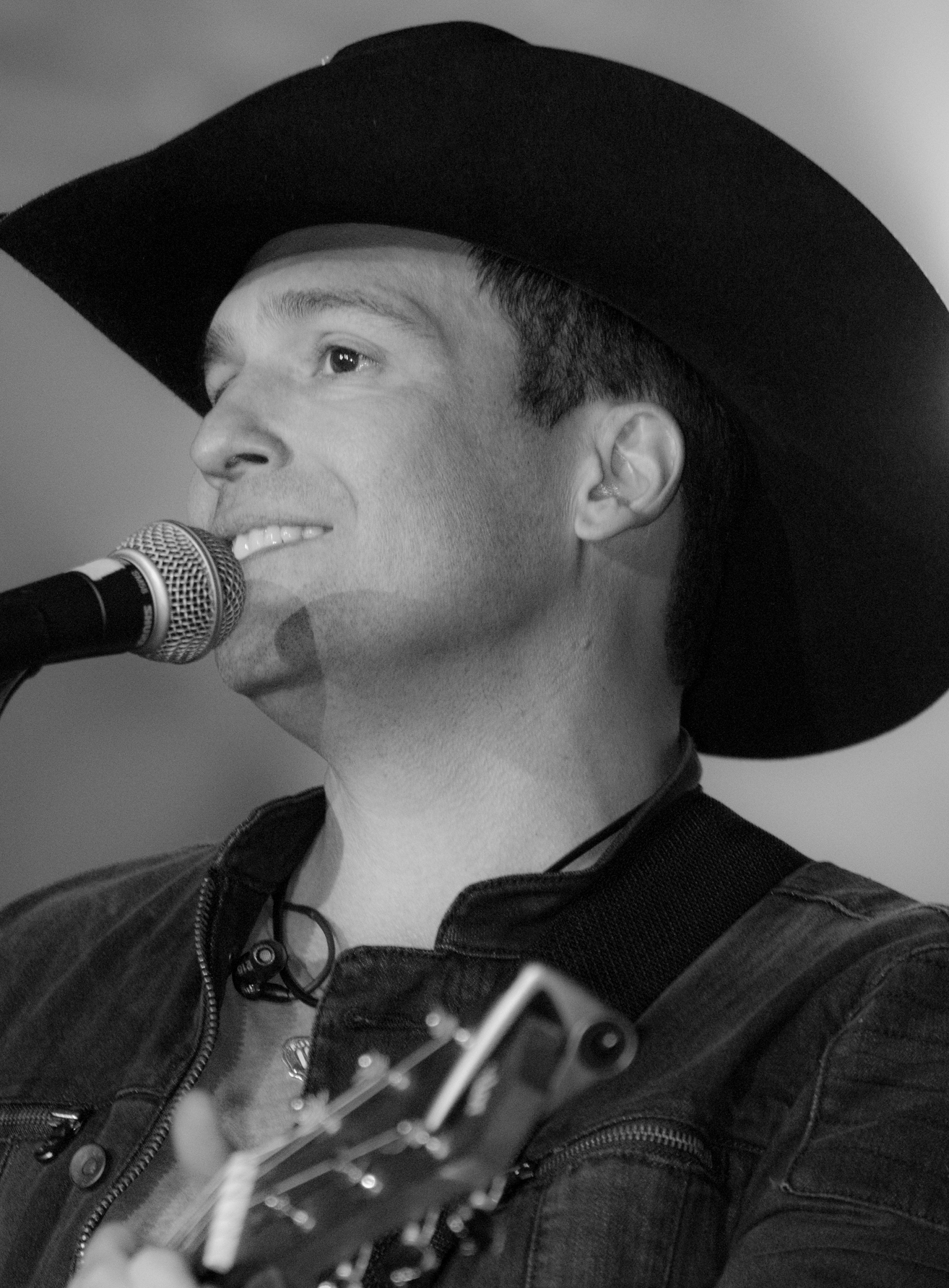

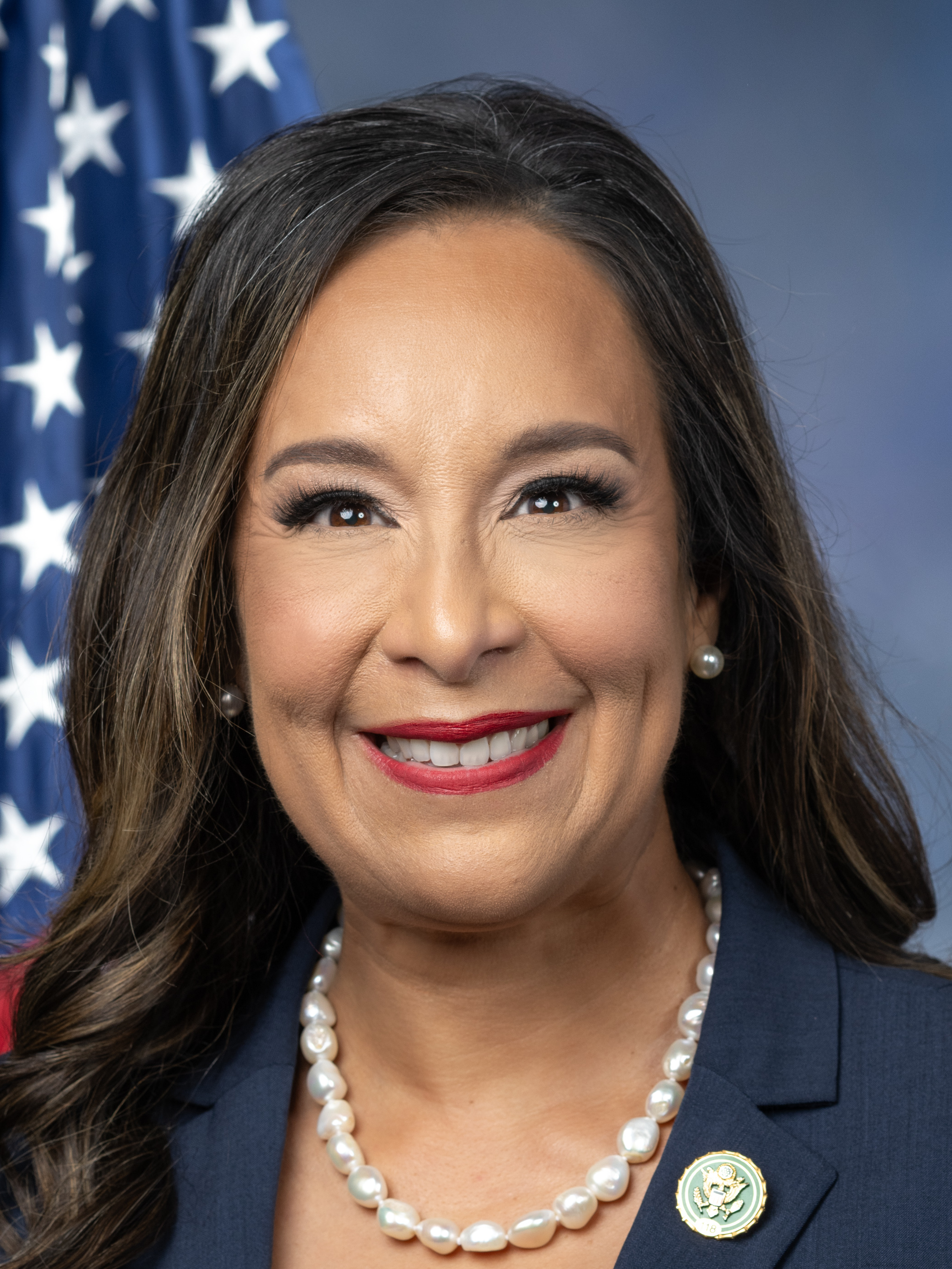
Nominee	Bobby Pulido	Monica De La Cruz
Party	Democratic	Republican
Popular vote	126,204	76,305
Percentage	62.3%	37.7%
U.S. Representative before election
Monica De La Cruz
Republican
Elected U.S. Representative
Bobby Pulido
Democratic

Texas's 15th congressional district boundary from the 2026 elections Interactive map version

The new 15th district stretches from Hidalgo County in the Rio Grande Valley (including Edinburg and Weslaco), and now extends northeasterly into several rural counties between Corpus Christi, San Antonio and Victoria, including such communities as Falfurrias, Alice, Sinton, Beeville, Cuero and Gonzales. The incumbent is Republican Monica De La Cruz, who was re-elected with 57.1% of the vote in 2024.

In 2024, Donald Trump won the district with 58.5% in the vote, at the same time Ted Cruz won it with 53.5%. The seat last voted for statewide Democrats in 2018 (Beto O'Rourke with 55.4%) and 2016 (Hillary Clinton with 55.0%). Despite those statewide margins, Pulido won in a landslide with more than 60 percent of the vote.

=== Republican primary ===
==== Nominee ====
- Monica De La Cruz, incumbent U.S. representative

==== Endorsements ====
Monica De La Cruz

Executive branch officials

- Donald Trump, president of the United States (2017–2021, 2025–present)

Statewide officials

- Greg Abbott, governor of Texas (2015–present)

Organizations

- AIPAC

==== Fundraising ====
Campaign finance reports as of February 11, 2026
Candidate	Raised	Spent	Cash on hand
Monica De La Cruz (R)	$3,518,456	$2,229,043	$1,903,383
Source: Federal Election Commission

==== Results ====
Republican primary results
Party	Candidate	Votes	%
Republican	Monica De La Cruz (incumbent)	30,083	100.0
Total votes		30,083	100.0

=== Democratic primary ===
==== Nominee ====
- Bobby Pulido, Tejano musician

==== Eliminated in primary ====
- Ada Cuellar, physician

==== Endorsements ====
Ada Cuellar

U.S. representatives

- Jasmine Crockett, TX-30 (2023–present)
Bobby Pulido

U.S. senators

- Ruben Gallego, Arizona (2025–present)

U.S. representatives

- Suzan DelBene, WA-01 (2012–present) (post-primary)

State legislators

- Gina Hinojosa, HD-49 (2017–present) and Democratic nominee for governor of Texas in 2026
- James Talarico, HD-50 (2018–present) and Democratic nominee for U.S. Senate from Texas in 2026

Organizations

- Blue Dog PAC
- Bold PAC
- Democratic Majority for Israel PAC
- Latino Victory Fund
- WelcomePAC
Declined to endorse

Labor unions

- Texas AFL-CIO

==== Fundraising ====
Campaign finance reports as of February 11, 2026
Candidate	Raised	Spent	Cash on hand
Ada Cuellar (D)	$980,567 (Note: $824,000 of this total was self-funded by Cuellar)	$943,433	$37,134
Bobby Pulido (D)	$1,044,744	$761,442	$283,302
Source: Federal Election Commission

==== Polling ====
Poll source	Date(s) administered	Sample size	Margin of error	Ada Cuellar	Bobby Pulido	Undecided
GBAO (D) (Note: Poll sponsored by Pulido's campaign)	January 24–27, 2026	500 (LV)	± 4.4%	19%	68%	13%

==== Results ====
Democratic primary results
Party	Candidate	Votes	%
Democratic	Bobby Pulido	36,957	67.5
Democratic	Ada Cuellar	17,757	32.5
Total votes		54,714	100.0

=== General election ===
==== Predictions ====
Source	Ranking	As of
Decision Desk HQ	Tossup	October 1, 2026
The Cook Political Report	Tossup	September 25, 2026
Inside Elections	Tilt D (flip)	October 29, 2026
Sabato's Crystal Ball	Lean D (flip)	October 27, 2026
Silver Bulletin	Lean D (flip)	October 22, 2026

==== Post-primary endorsements ====
Bobby Pulido (D)

Individuals

- Los Tigres del Norte, band
- Matthew Yglesias, journalist

Labor unions

- American Federation of Government Employees
- Texas AFL-CIO

Organizations

- CHC BOLD PAC
- DCCC Red to Blue
- Democrats for Education Reform
- J Street
- Leadership Now Project

==== Fundraising ====
Campaign finance reports as of September 30, 2026
Candidate	Raised	Spent	Cash on hand
Monica De La Cruz (R)	$6,551,097	$6,362,072	$802,995
Bobby Pulido (D)	$6,213,369	$4,839,657	$1,373,712
Source: Federal Election Commission

==== Polling ====
Poll source	Date(s) administered	Sample size	Margin of error	Monica De La Cruz (R)	Bobby Pulido (D)	Undecided
Texas Southern University (Note: Poll conducted for El Pais, Puente News Collaborative and the San Antonio Express-News)	October 13–16, 2026	(LV)	± 3.8%	44%	51%	5%
Normington Petts (D) (Note: Poll sponsored by House Majority PAC, which is focused on electing Democrats to the U.S. House of Representatives)	September 24–28, 2026	400 (LV)	± 4.9%	41%	54%	5%
Public Policy Research/Texas Southern University	August 18–22, 2026	700 (LV)	± 3.7%	45%	50%	5%
Normington Petts (D)	July 23–27, 2026	553 (LV)	–	45%	51%	4%
Applecart (D) (Note: Poll commissioned by WelcomePAC, which supports Pulido)	May 18–25, 2026	802 (LV)	± 4.1%	46%	48%	6%
Public Policy Polling (D)	September 10–11, 2025	533 (LV)	–	41%	38%	21%

Hypothetical polling

Generic Republican vs. generic Democrat

Poll source	Date(s) administered	Sample size	Margin of error	Generic Republican	Generic Democrat	Undecided
Applecart	May 18–25, 2026	802 (LV)	± 4.1%	49%	46%	5%

==== Results ====
2026 Texas's 15th congressional district election
Party	Candidate	Votes	%	±%
Republican	Monica De La Cruz (incumbent)			
Democratic	Bobby Pulido			
Total votes				

== District 16 ==
2026 Texas's 16th congressional district election
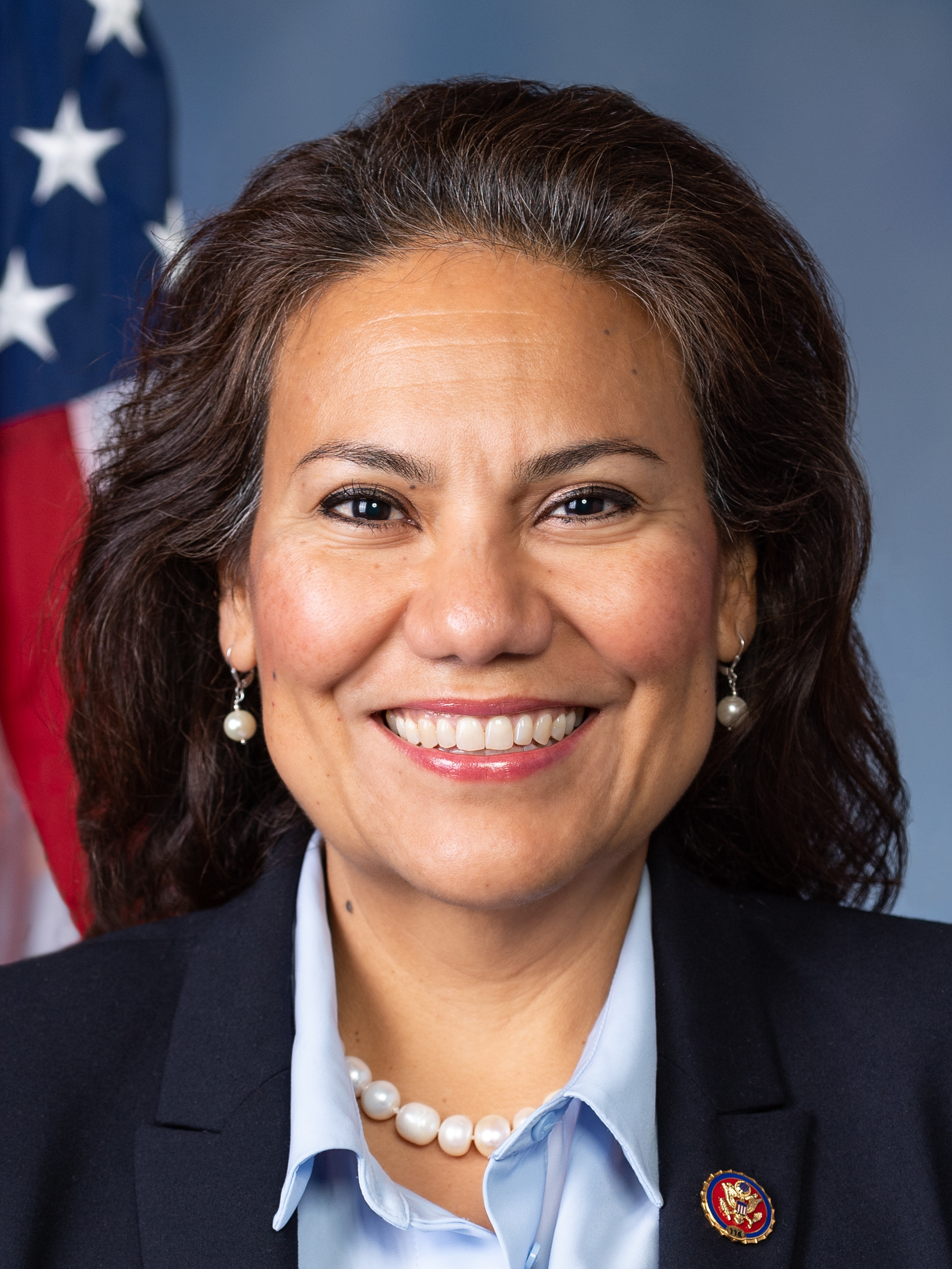

Nominee	Veronica Escobar	Adam Bauman
Party	Democratic	Republican
Popular vote	139,555	57,562
Percentage	70.8%	29.2%
U.S. Representative before election
Veronica Escobar
Democratic
Elected U.S. Representative
Veronica Escobar
Democratic

Texas's 16th congressional district boundary from the 2026 elections Interactive map version

The new 16th district is entirely within El Paso County, taking in El Paso and such surrounding suburbs as Socorro, Horizon City, and Anthony. The incumbent is Democrat Veronica Escobar, who was re-elected with 59.5% of the vote in 2024. In 2024, Kamala Harris won 57.4% of the vote in this heavily Hispanic district, where Colin Allred also won with 58.4% of the vote.

=== Democratic primary ===
==== Nominee ====
- Veronica Escobar, incumbent U.S. representative

==== Not on ballot ====
- Arturo Andujo, college physics graduate

==== Endorsements ====
Veronica Escobar

Labor unions

- Texas AFL-CIO

Organizations

- J Street
- Planned Parenthood Action Fund

==== Fundraising ====
Campaign finance reports as of February 11, 2026
Candidate	Raised	Spent	Cash on hand
Veronica Escobar (D)	$617,320	$488,080	$245,085
Source: Federal Election Commission

==== Results ====
Democratic primary results
Party	Candidate	Votes	%
Democratic	Veronica Escobar (incumbent)	54,031	100.0
Total votes		54,031	100.0

=== Republican primary ===
==== Nominee ====
- Adam Bauman, business owner

==== Eliminated in runoff ====
- Manuel Barraza, paralegal

==== Eliminated in primary ====
- Hector Cabildo, entrepreneur
- Raul Castaneda, retiree
- Marisela Chavez, retiree
- Deliris Montanez Berrios, retired medical worker and Democratic candidate for this district in 2022
- Ruben Rios, teacher

==== Fundraising ====
Campaign finance reports as of February 11, 2026
Candidate	Raised	Spent	Cash on hand
Hector Cabildo (R)	$10,964 (Note: $5,581 of this total was self-funded by Cabildo)	$5,702	$5,282
Deliris Montanez Berrios (R)	$6,580 (Note: $2,887 of this total was self-funded by Montanez Berrios)	$6,583	$1,220
Source: Federal Election Commission

==== Results ====
Republican primary results
Party	Candidate	Votes	%
Republican	Adam Bauman	4,738	27.9
Republican	Manuel Barraza	3,577	21.1
Republican	Ruben Rios	2,868	16.9
Republican	Raul Castaneda	2,337	13.8
Republican	Marisela Chavez	1,860	11.0
Republican	Deliris Montanez Berrios	1,591	9.4
Total votes		16,971	100.0

==== Runoff results ====
Republican primary runoff results
Party	Candidate	Votes	%
Republican	Adam Bauman	7,752	68.5
Republican	Manuel Barraza	3,557	31.5
Total votes		11,309	100.0

=== General election ===
==== Predictions ====
Source	Ranking	As of
Decision Desk HQ	Safe D	July 14, 2026
The Cook Political Report	Solid D	February 6, 2025
Inside Elections	Solid D	March 7, 2025
Sabato's Crystal Ball	Safe D	September 18, 2025
Silver Bulletin	Solid D	October 22, 2026

==== Post-primary endorsements ====
Veronica Escobar (D)

Labor unions

- American Federation of Government Employees

Organizations

- Giffords
- Progressive Democrats of America

==== Fundraising ====
Campaign finance reports as of April 26, 2026
Candidate	Raised	Spent	Cash on hand
Veronica Escobar (D)	$730,213	$557,795	$288,263
Adam Bauman (R)	$0	$0	$0
Source: Federal Election Commission

==== Results ====
2026 Texas's 16th congressional district election
Party	Candidate	Votes	%	±%
Democratic	Veronica Escobar (incumbent)			
Republican	Adam Bauman			
Total votes				

== District 17 ==
2026 Texas's 17th congressional district election
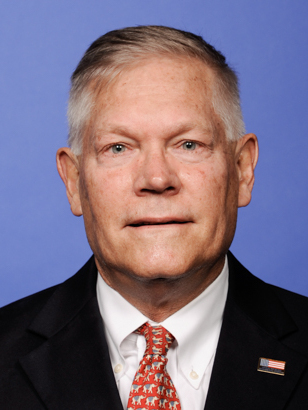

Nominee	Pete Sessions	Casey Shepard
Party	Republican	Democratic
Popular vote	143,523	124,480
Percentage	53.6%	46.4%
U.S. Representative before election
Pete Sessions
Republican
Elected U.S. Representative
Pete Sessions
Republican

Texas's 17th congressional district boundary from the 2026 elections Interactive map version

The new 17th district is anchored in Waco and its surrounding metropolitan area, with a small sliver of the district extending into the east side of Temple and a southern sliver of Williamson County, with the Austin suburb of Cedar Park connected to the rest of the district via a small sliver of Round Rock. The incumbent is Republican Pete Sessions, who was re-elected with 66.4% of the vote in 2024. The new district gave 60% of the vote to Donald Trump and 57.5% to Ted Cruz in 2024.

=== Republican primary ===
==== Nominee ====
- Pete Sessions, incumbent U.S. representative

==== Withdrawn ====
- Rob Brown, pastor (ran in the 10th district)

==== Endorsements ====
Pete Sessions

Executive branch officials

- Donald Trump, 45th and 47th president of the United States (2017–2021, 2025–present)

Statewide officials

- Greg Abbott, governor of Texas (2015–present)

Organizations

- AIPAC

==== Fundraising ====
Campaign finance reports as of February 11, 2026
Candidate	Raised	Spent	Cash on hand
Pete Sessions (R)	$816,844	$407,485	$850,294
Source: Federal Election Commission

==== Results ====
Republican primary results
Party	Candidate	Votes	%
Republican	Pete Sessions (incumbent)	59,724	100.0
Total votes		59,724	100.0

=== Democratic primary ===
==== Nominee ====
- Casey Shepard, attorney

==== Eliminated in runoff ====
- Milah Flores, nonprofit professional

==== Eliminated in primary ====
- James Gordon Mitchell, former school board trustee

==== Endorsements ====
Milah Flores

Labor unions

- Texas AFL-CIO
Casey Shepard

Newspapers

- Austin American-Statesman
Declined to endorse

Newspapers

- The Austin Chronicle

==== Fundraising ====
Campaign finance reports as of February 11, 2026
Candidate	Raised	Spent	Cash on hand
James Gordon Mitchell (D)	$16,692 (Note: $9,786 of this total was self-funded by Mitchell)	$12,540	$3,792
Casey Shepard (D)	$5,707 (Note: $5,000 of this total was self-funded by Shepard)	$1,631	$4,076
Source: Federal Election Commission

==== Results ====
Democratic primary results
Party	Candidate	Votes	%
Democratic	Milah Flores	20,420	42.6
Democratic	Casey Shepard	15,552	32.4
Democratic	James Gordon Mitchell	12,000	25.0
Total votes		47,972	100.0

==== Runoff results ====
Democratic primary runoff results
Party	Candidate	Votes	%
Democratic	Casey Shepard	5,122	59.9
Democratic	Milah Flores	3,432	40.1
Total votes		8,554	100.0

=== General election ===
==== Predictions ====
Source	Ranking	As of
Decision Desk HQ	Likely R	November 3, 2026
The Cook Political Report	Solid R	February 6, 2025
Inside Elections	Solid R	March 7, 2025
Sabato's Crystal Ball	Safe R	September 18, 2025
Silver Bulletin	Solid R	October 22, 2026

==== Fundraising ====
Campaign finance reports as of April 26, 2026
Candidate	Raised	Spent	Cash on hand
Pete Sessions (R)	$901,426	$454,306	$888,055
Casey Shepard (D)	$8,004	$5,620	$2,384
Source: Federal Election Commission

==== Results ====
2026 Texas's 17th congressional district election
Party	Candidate	Votes	%	±%
Republican	Pete Sessions (incumbent)			
Democratic	Casey Shepard			
Total votes				

== District 18 ==
2026 Texas's 18th congressional district election
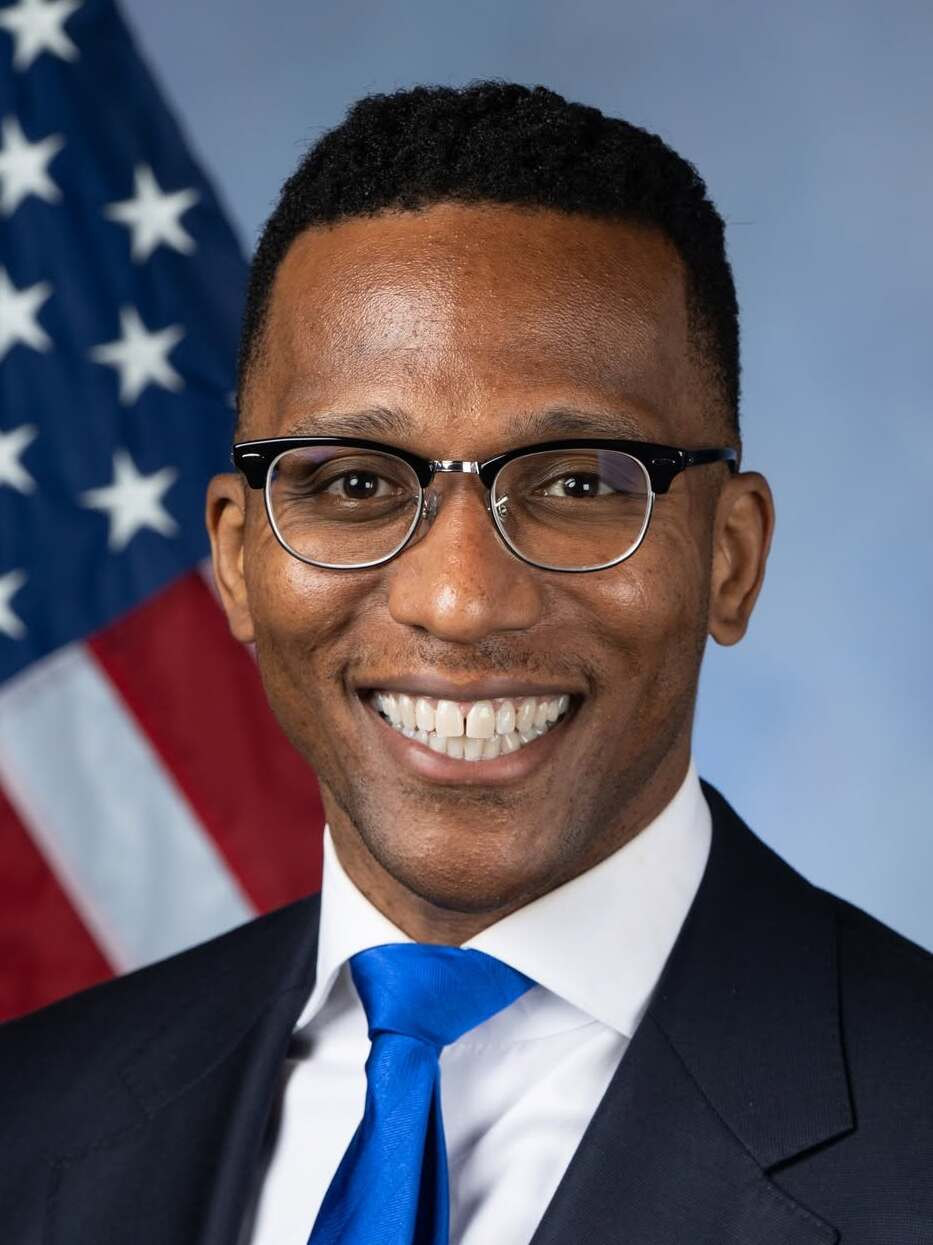

Nominee	Christian Menefee	Ronald Whitfield
Party	Democratic	Republican
Popular vote	193,149	31,334
Percentage	86%	14%
U.S. Representative before election
Al Green
Christian Menefee
Democratic
Elected U.S. Representative
Christian Menefee
Democratic

Texas's 18th congressional district boundary from the 2026 elections Interactive map version

The new 18th district has two incumbents: Democrat Al Green, who was re-elected unopposed in 2024 for the 9th district, and Christian Menefee who succeeded Sylvester Turner, who died unexpectedly in March 2025, in a special election runoff held in January 2026.

The new district, which has a voting age population that is 45% Black and 32.2% Hispanic, includes the Downtown, EaDo, Midtown, Third Ward and Fifth Ward portions of Houston as well as the Texas Medical Center, the Museum District and NRG Stadium, and extends northeast to Settegast and Fall Creek in northeast Houston, Sunnyside and Brays Oaks in south and southwest Houston, and northern Missouri City, Stafford and Fresno in Fort Bend County. In 2024, the district gave Kamala Harris 76.7% of the vote and 78.5% to Colin Allred.

=== Democratic primary ===
==== Nominee ====
- Christian Menefee, incumbent U.S. representative

==== Eliminated in runoff ====
- Al Green, incumbent U.S. representative from the 9th district

==== Eliminated in primary ====
- Gretchen Brown, defense analyst

==== Withdrawn ====
- Amanda Edwards, former at-large Houston city councilor (2016–2020), candidate for U.S. Senate in 2020, candidate for this district in 2024, and runner-up in the 2025–26 special election (remained on ballot)

==== Endorsements ====
Al Green

U.S. representatives

- Sanford Bishop, GA-02 (1993–present)
- Andre Carson, IN-07 (2008–present)
- Joaquin Castro, TX-20 (2013–present)
- Emanuel Cleaver, MO-05 (2005–present)
- Adriano Espaillat, NY-13 (2017–present)
- Cleo Fields, LA-06 (1993–1997, 2025–present)
- Jonathan Jackson, IL-01 (2023–present)
- Hank Johnson, GA-04 (2007–present)
- Stephen Lynch, MA-08 (2001–present)
- Kwesi Mfume, MD-07 (1987–1996, 2020–present)
- Bennie Thompson, MS-02 (1993–present)
- Maxine Waters, CA-43 (1991–present)

State legislators

- Ron Reynolds, state representative from the 27th district (2011–present)
- Gene Wu, minority leader of the Texas House of Representatives (2025–present) from the 137th district (2013–present)

Local officials

- Lina Hidalgo, Harris County judge (2019–present)

Labor unions

- American Federation of Government Employees

Organizations

- Planned Parenthood Action Fund
Christian Menefee

U.S. representatives

- Jasmine Crockett, TX-30 (2023–present)

State legislators

- Lauren Ashley Simmons, state representative from the 146th district (2025–present)

Organizations

- Houston LGBTQ+ Political Caucus
- Progressive Change Campaign Committee

Newspapers

- Houston Chronicle
Declined to endorse

Local officials

- Rodney Ellis, Harris County commissioner (2017–present)

Labor unions

- Texas AFL-CIO

==== Fundraising ====
Campaign finance reports as of February 11, 2026
Candidate	Raised	Spent	Cash on hand
Gretchen Brown (D)	$11,937	$1,400	$10,537
Al Green (D)	$940,155 (Note: $100,000 of this total was self-funded by Green)	$620,451	$538,789
Christian Menefee (D)	$2,668,708	$2,538,382	$130,326
Source: Federal Election Commission

==== Polling ====
Amanda Edwards vs. Al Green vs. Christian Menefee

Poll source	Date(s) administered	Sample size	Margin of error	Amanda Edwards	Al Green	Christian Menefee	Other	Undecided
	February 9, 2026	Edwards withdraws from the race						
University of Houston	February 3–8, 2026	1,000 (LV)	± 3.1%	9%	28%	52%	1% (Note: Gretchen Brown with 1%)	10%
Lake Research Partners (D) (Note: Poll sponsored by Menefee's campaign)	February 2–8, 2026	430 (LV)	± 4.7%	7%	29%	49%	0% (Note: Gretchen Brown with 0%)	15%
Lake Research Partners (D)	February 2–8, 2026	430 (LV)	± 4.7%	–	34%	52%	–	14%
Lake Research Partners (D)	December 15–21, 2025	455 (LV)	± 4.6%	–	42%	47%	–	9%
Lake Research Partners (D)	December 15–21, 2025	455 (LV)	± 4.6%	13%	35%	41%	–	7%
Lake Research Partners (D)	December 15–21, 2025	455 (LV)	± 4.6%	–	36% (Note: If Menefee wins the special election)	51%	–	11%

==== Results ====
Democratic primary results
Party	Candidate	Votes	%
Democratic	Christian Menefee (incumbent)	43,750	46.0
Democratic	Al Green (incumbent)	42,009	44.2
Democratic	Amanda Edwards (withdrawn)	7,339	7.7
Democratic	Gretchen Brown	1,941	2.0
Total votes		95,039	100.0

==== Runoff polling ====
Poll source	Date(s) administered	Sample size	Margin of error	Al Green	Christian Menefee	Undecided
University of Houston	May 5–8, 2026	800 (LV)	± 3.46%	43%	50%	7%

==== Runoff results ====
Democratic primary runoff results
Party	Candidate	Votes	%
Democratic	Christian Menefee (incumbent)	34,090	69.3
Democratic	Al Green (incumbent)	15,101	30.7
Total votes		49,191	100.0

=== Republican primary ===
==== Nominee ====
- Ronald Whitfield, landscaping contractor and candidate for this district in 2025

==== Eliminated in primary ====
- Elizabeth Vences, accountant

==== Endorsements ====
Elizabeth Vences

Newspapers

- Houston Chronicle

==== Results ====
Republican primary results
Party	Candidate	Votes	%
Republican	Ronald Whitfield	5,280	55.1
Republican	Elizabeth Vences	4,301	44.9
Total votes		9,581	100.0

=== General election ===
==== Predictions ====
Source	Ranking	As of
Decision Desk HQ	Safe D	July 14, 2026
The Cook Political Report	Solid D	February 6, 2025
Inside Elections	Solid D	March 7, 2025
Sabato's Crystal Ball	Safe D	September 18, 2025
Silver Bulletin	Solid D	October 22, 2026

==== Post-primary endorsements ====
Christian Menefee (D)

Labor unions

- American Federation of Government Employees

Organizations

- Giffords

==== Fundraising ====
Campaign finance reports as of April 26, 2026
Candidate	Raised	Spent	Cash on hand
Christian Menefee (D)	$3,463,829	$3,145,794	$318,035
Ronald Whitfield (R)	$0	$0	$0
Source: Federal Election Commission

==== Results ====
2026 Texas's 18th congressional district election
Party	Candidate	Votes	%	±%
Democratic	Christian Menefee (incumbent)			
Republican	Ronald Whitfield			
Total votes				

== District 19 ==
2026 Texas's 19th congressional district election

Nominee	Tom Sell	Kyle Rable
Party	Republican	Democratic
Popular vote	154,079	67,674
Percentage	69.4%	30.5%
U.S. Representative before election
Jodey Arrington
Republican
Elected U.S. Representative
Tom Sell
Republican

Texas's 19th congressional district boundary from the 2026 elections Interactive map version

The new 19th district, then as now, encompasses much of West Texas including Lubbock and Abilene along with Big Spring. The incumbent is Republican Jodey Arrington, who was re-elected with 80.7% of the vote in 2024. Arrington is not seeking reelection to a sixth term in the heavily Republican district, which gave 75.3% of the vote to Donald Trump and 73% to Ted Cruz in 2024, and is a majority White district with a voting age population that is 34.7% Hispanic.

=== Republican primary ===
==== Nominee ====
- Tom Sell, businessman

==== Eliminated in runoff ====
- Abraham Enriquez, outreach group founder

==== Eliminated in primary ====
- James Barbee, business owner
- Jason Corley, Lubbock County commissioner (2019–present) and candidate for this district in 2016
- Donald May, surgeon and candidate for this district in 2003, 2014, and 2016
- Matt Smith, roofing company owner
- Ryan Zink, convicted felon, participant in the January 6 United States Capitol attack, and candidate for this district in 2024

==== Declined ====
- Jodey Arrington, incumbent U.S. representative
- Ashley Cash, entrepreneur
- Carl Tepper, state representative from the 84th district (2023–present) (running for re-election)

==== Endorsements ====
Abraham Enriquez

Statewide officials

- Greg Abbott, governor of Texas (2015–present)

Organizations

- Conservative Political Action Conference
- Turning Point Action
Tom Sell

U.S. representatives

- Larry Combest, former TX-19 (1985–2003)
- Jake Ellzey, TX-06 (2021–present)
- Tom Emmer, House majority whip (2023–present) from MN–08 (2015–present)
- Jim Jordan, OH-04 (2007–present)
- Anna Paulina Luna, FL-13 (2023–present)
- Steve Scalise, House majority leader (2023–present) from LA-01 (2008–present)
- Pete Sessions, TX-17 (1997–2019, 2021–present)

Organizations

- U.S. Chamber of Commerce
Jodey Arrington (withdrawn)

Executive branch officials

- Donald Trump, president of the United States (2017–2021, 2025–present)
Declined to endorse

U.S. representatives

- Jodey Arrington, TX-19 (2017–present)

==== Fundraising ====
Campaign finance reports as of February 11, 2026
Candidate	Raised	Spent	Cash on hand
James Barbee (R)	$16,000	$14,156	$1,843
Jason Corley (R)	$37,240	$23,328	$13,911
Abraham Enriquez (R)	$434,048 (Note: $100,000 of this total was self-funded by Enriquez)	$281,897	$152,151
Donald May (R)	$102,445 (Note: $100,000 of this total was self-funded by May)	$67,369	$35,075
Tom Sell (R)	$1,226,626	$471,929	$754,696
Matt Smith (R)	$354,064 (Note: $320,000 of this total was self-funded by Smith)	$338,594	$15,470
Source: Federal Election Commission

==== Polling ====
Poll source	Date(s) administered	Sample size	Margin of error	Abraham Enriquez	Matt Smith	Tom Sell	Other	Undecided
Harper Polling (R) (Note: Poll sponsored by Sell's campaign)	February 10, 2026	400 (LV)	± 4.9%	8%	9%	28%	4% (Note: Corley with 2%; May and Zink with 1%; Barbee and Adams with 0%)	51%

==== Results ====
Primary results by county: Sell: 20–30%; 30–40%; 40–50%; 50–60%; 60–70%; Enriquez: 40–50%; Smith: 30–40%

Republican primary results
Party	Candidate	Votes	%
Republican	Tom Sell	31,447	40.4
Republican	Abraham Enriquez	14,585	18.8
Republican	Matt Smith	14,399	18.5
Republican	Jason Corley	8,123	10.4
Republican	Donald May	5,416	7.0
Republican	Ryan Zink	1,998	2.6
Republican	James Barbee	1,826	2.3
Total votes		77,794	100.0

==== Runoff polling ====
Poll source	Date(s) administered	Sample size	Margin of error	Abraham Enriquez	Tom Sell	Undecided
Harper Polling (R)	April 7–8, 2026	400 (LV)	± 4.9%	17%	57%	26%

==== Runoff results ====
Runoff results by county: Sell: 50–60%; 60–70%; 70–80%; 80–90%; Enriquez: 50–60%

Republican primary runoff results
Party	Candidate	Votes	%
Republican	Tom Sell	32,243	64.3
Republican	Abraham Enriquez	17,939	35.7
Total votes		50,182	100.0

=== Democratic primary ===
==== Nominee ====
- Kyle Rable, secretary of the Lubbock County Democratic Party

==== Endorsements ====
Kyle Rable

Labor unions

- Texas AFL-CIO

Organizations

- Track AIPAC

==== Fundraising ====
Campaign finance reports as of December 31, 2025
Candidate	Raised	Spent	Cash on hand
Kyle Rable (D)	$13,014	$8,672	$4,341
Source: Federal Election Commission

==== Results ====
Democratic primary results
Party	Candidate	Votes	%
Democratic	Kyle Rable	22,513	100.0
Total votes		22,513	100.0

=== General election ===
==== Predictions ====
Source	Ranking	As of
Decision Desk HQ	Safe R	July 14, 2026
The Cook Political Report	Solid R	February 6, 2025
Inside Elections	Solid R	March 7, 2025
Sabato's Crystal Ball	Safe R	September 18, 2025
Silver Bulletin	Solid R	October 22, 2026

==== Fundraising ====
Campaign finance reports as of April 26, 2026
Candidate	Raised	Spent	Cash on hand
Tom Sell	$2,014,494	$1,343,689	$670,805
Kyle Rable	$21,086	$12,557	$8,529
Source: Federal Election Commission

==== Results ====
2026 Texas's 19th congressional district election
Party	Candidate	Votes	%	±%
Republican	Tom Sell			
Democratic	Kyle Rable			
Total votes				

== District 20 ==
2026 Texas's 20th congressional district election
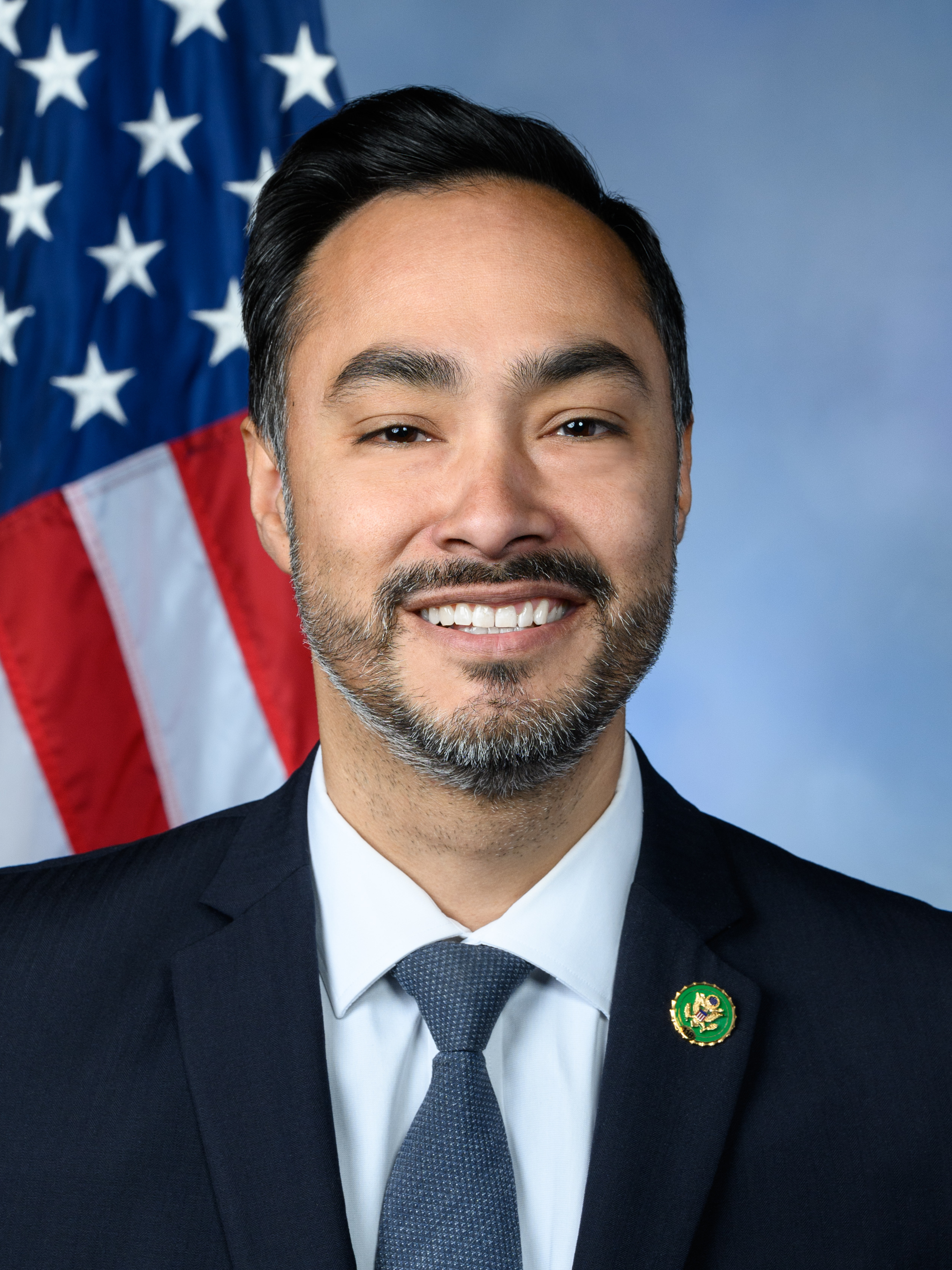

Nominee	Joaquin Castro	Edgardo Baez
Party	Democratic	Republican
Popular vote	149,397	43,097
Percentage	77.6%	22.4%
U.S. Representative before election
Joaquin Castro
Democratic
Elected U.S. Representative
Joaquin Castro
Democratic

Texas's 20th congressional district boundary from the 2026 elections Interactive map version

The new 20th district encompasses downtown San Antonio and extends eastward to its historically Black east side and the community of Kirby, as well as westward to Leon Valley and several neighborhoods north of Lackland AFB. The incumbent is Democrat Joaquin Castro, who was re-elected unopposed in 2024. Kamala Harris won the two-thirds Hispanic district with 63.5% of the vote and Colin Allred 66.6% in 2024.

=== Democratic primary ===
==== Nominee ====
- Joaquin Castro, incumbent U.S. representative

==== Eliminated in primary ====
- John Atwood, professor
- Kendra Wilkerson, teacher and candidate for San Antonio City Council in 2025

==== Endorsements ====
Joaquin Castro

Labor unions

- Texas AFL-CIO

Organizations

- J Street
- Planned Parenthood Action Fund

Newspapers

- San Antonio Express-News

==== Fundraising ====
Campaign finance reports as of February 11, 2026
Candidate	Raised	Spent	Cash on hand
Joaquin Castro (D)	$286,270	$343,027	$81,900
Source: Federal Election Commission

==== Results ====
Democratic primary results
Party	Candidate	Votes	%
Democratic	Joaquin Castro (incumbent)	58,260	88.2
Democratic	Kendra Wilkerson	6,191	9.4
Democratic	John Atwood	1,633	2.5
Total votes		66,084	100.0

=== Republican primary ===
==== Nominee ====
- Edgardo Baez, attorney

==== Fundraising ====
Campaign finance reports as of February 11, 2026
Candidate	Raised	Spent	Cash on hand
Edgardo Baez (R)	$31,345 (Note: $15,135 of this total was self-funded by Baez)	$27,073	$4,272
Source: Federal Election Commission

==== Results ====
Republican primary results
Party	Candidate	Votes	%
Republican	Edgardo Baez	9,240	100.0
Total votes		9,240	100.0

=== Independents ===
==== Filed paperwork ====
- Anthony Tristan, Democratic candidate for the 27th district in 2022 and 2024

=== General election ===
==== Predictions ====
Source	Ranking	As of
Decision Desk HQ	Safe D	July 14, 2026
The Cook Political Report	Solid D	February 6, 2025
Inside Elections	Solid D	March 7, 2025
Sabato's Crystal Ball	Safe D	September 18, 2025
Silver Bulletin	Solid D	October 22, 2026

==== Post-primary endorsements ====
Joaquin Castro (D)

Labor unions

- American Federation of Government Employees
- United Auto Workers

==== Fundraising ====
Campaign finance reports as of April 26, 2026
Candidate	Raised	Spent	Cash on hand
Joaquin Castro (D)	$397,397	$365,689	$170,365
Edgardo Baez (R)	$32,503	$27,073	$5,430
Source: Federal Election Commission

==== Results ====
2026 Texas's 20th congressional district election
Party	Candidate	Votes	%	±%
Democratic	Joaquin Castro (incumbent)			
Republican	Edgardo Baez			
Total votes				

== District 21 ==
2026 Texas's 21st congressional district election
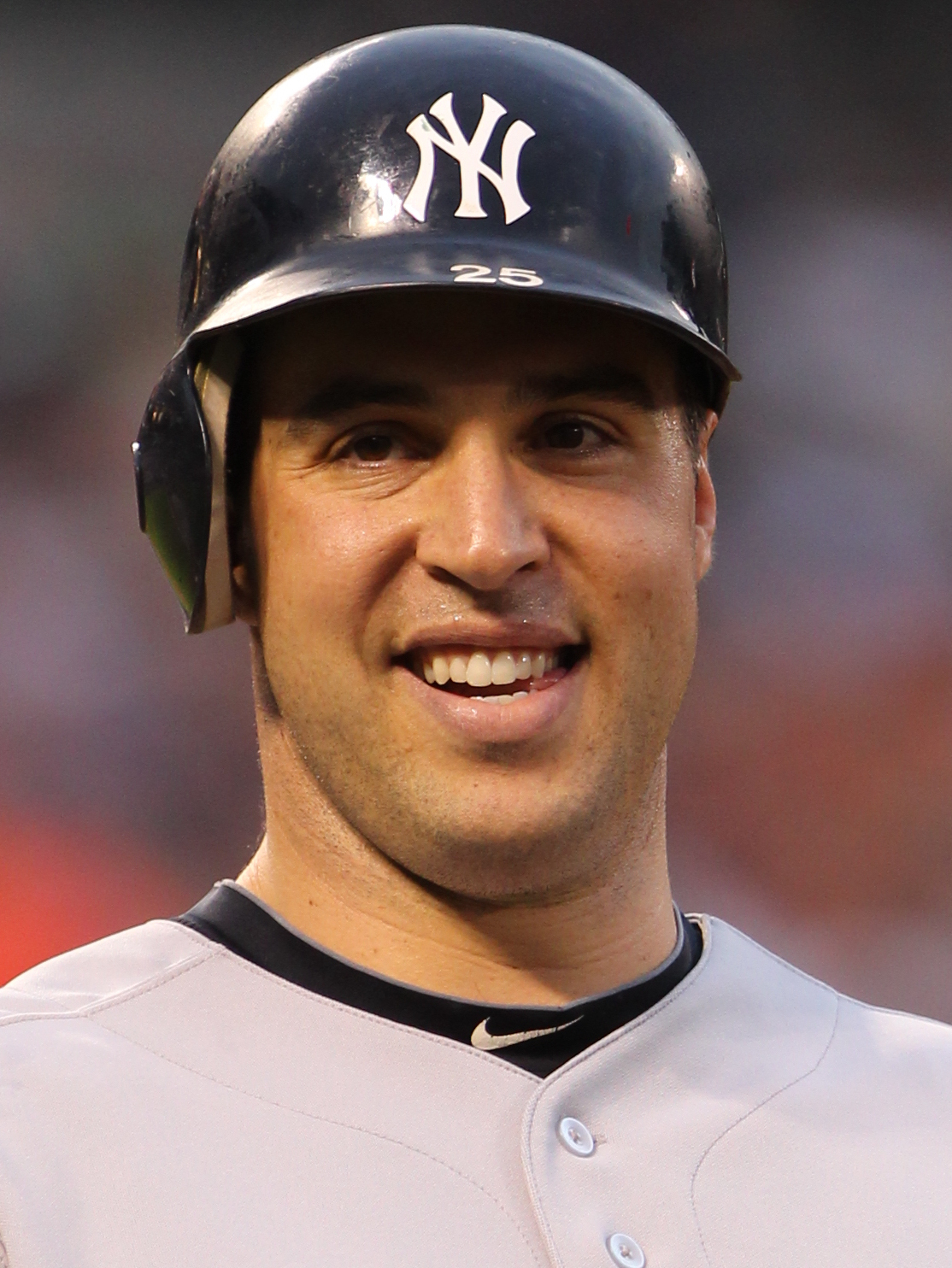

Nominee	Mark Teixeira	Kristin Hook
Party	Republican	Democratic
Popular vote	194,394	162,119
Percentage	54.5%	45.5%
U.S. Representative before election
Chip Roy
Republican
Elected U.S. Representative
Mark Teixeira
Republican

Texas's 21st congressional district boundary from the 2026 elections Interactive map version

The new 21st district takes in the Texas Hill Country, including Fredericksburg, Boerne, Kerrville and Bandera, along with Comal County including New Braunfels and most of Hays County including San Marcos, Wimberley and Dripping Springs, as well as most of northwest San Antonio along with Alamo Heights, Castle Hills, the eastern half of Stone Oak and Fort Sam Houston in Bexar County. The incumbent is Republican Chip Roy, who was elected with 61.9% of the vote in 2024 and ran for Texas Attorney General in 2026, but lost in the primary. A Republican-held district since 1978, Donald Trump won 60.3% of the vote in this largely exurban district, which also gave Ted Cruz 57.7%, both in 2024.

=== Republican primary ===
==== Nominee ====
- Mark Teixeira, former MLB player

==== Eliminated in primary ====
- Daniel Betts, attorney and nominee for Travis County district attorney in 2024
- Jason Cahill, businessman
- Jacques DuBose, former Boerne city councilman
- Zeke Enriquez, U.S. Marine Corps veteran (previously ran in the 23rd district)
- Weston Martinez, businessman
- Paul Rojas, engineer
- Heather Tessmer, attorney
- Trey Trainor, former commissioner from the Federal Election Commission (2020–2025)
- Peggy Wardlaw, engineer and candidate for this district in 2018
- Michael Wheeler, senior advisor to the Small Business Administration and former chair of the Kendall County Republican party

==== Withdrawn ====
- Kyle Sinclair, former vice chair of the Bexar County Republican Party, candidate for the 28th district in 2024 and nominee for the 20th district in 2022 (remained on ballot, endorsed Teixeira)

==== Declined ====
- Jessica Karlsruher, lobbyist (ran in the 10th district)
- Aaron Reitz, former U.S. assistant attorney general for the Office of Legal Policy (2025) (ran for attorney general)
- Chip Roy, incumbent U.S. representative (ran for attorney general)
- Marc Whyte, San Antonio city councilor from the 10th district (2023–present) and candidate for Texas's 121st House of Representatives district in 2018

==== Endorsements ====
Daniel Betts

U.S. senators

- Rick Santorum, former Pennsylvania (1995-2007)

U.S. representatives

- Keith Rothfus, former PA-12 (2013-2019)

Newspapers

- Austin American-Statesman
- San Antonio Express-News
Zeke Enriquez

U.S. representatives

- Barry Goldwater Jr., former CA-20 (1969–1983)
Weston Martinez

U.S. senators

- Markwayne Mullin, Oklahoma (2023–present)
Mark Teixeira

Executive branch officials

- Donald Trump, president of the United States (2017–2021, 2025–present)

U.S. representatives

- Brian Babin, TX-36 (2015–present)
- Jake Ellzey, TX-06 (2021–present)
- Tom Emmer, House majority whip (2023–present) from MN-08 (2015–present)
- Pat Fallon, TX-04 (2021–present)
- Brandon Gill, TX-26 (2025–present)
- Craig Goldman, TX-12 (2025–present)
- Jim Jordan, OH-04 (2007–present)
- David McIntosh, former IN-02 (1995–2001)
- Troy Nehls, TX-22 (2021–present)
- August Pfluger, TX-11 (2021–present)
- Steve Scalise, House majority leader (2023–present) from LA-01 (2008–present)
- Greg Steube, FL-17 (2021–present)
- Randy Weber, TX-14 (2013–present)
- Roger Williams, TX-25 (2013–present)

Statewide officials

- Greg Abbott, governor of Texas (2015–present)

Party officials

- Kyle Sinclair, former vice chair of the Bexar County Republican Party and former candidate for this district

Individuals

- Riley Gaines, conservative activist

Organizations

- Club for Growth PAC
- Turning Point Action
- U.S. Chamber of Commerce
Trey Trainor

Statewide officials

- Wayne Christian, Texas railroad commissioner (2017–present)

Party officials

- Cathie Adams, former chair of the Texas Republican Party (2009–2010)

Organizations

- Eagle Forum PAC

==== Fundraising ====
Campaign finance reports as of February 11, 2026
Candidate	Raised	Spent	Cash on hand
Daniel Betts (R)	$170,919	$84,775	$86,144
Jason Cahill (R)	$348,702 (Note: $260,000 of this total was self-funded by Cahill)	$291,977	$56,724
Zeke Enriquez (R)	$104,652 (Note: $36,152 of this total was self-funded by Enriquez)	$100,594	$0
Weston Martinez (R)	$19,906	$14,126	$5,780
Paul Rojas (R)	$165,026 (Note: $130,000 of this total was self-funded by Rojas)	$8,164	$156,861
Mark Teixeira (R)	$3,466,723 (Note: $2,750,000 of this total was self-funded by Teixeira)	$2,459,292	$1,007,430
Trey Trainor (R)	$139,665	$63,348	$76,316
Michael Wheeler (R)	$345,600 (Note: $224,891 of this total was self-funded by Wheeler)	$262,246	$83,354
Source: Federal Election Commission

==== Polling ====
Poll source	Date(s) administered	Sample size	Margin of error	Jason Cahill	Mark Teixeira	Trey Trainor	Michael Wheeler	Other	Undecided
Ragnar Research Partners (R) (Note: Poll sponsored by Teixeira's campaign)	February 5–7, 2026	400 (LV)	± 5.0%	7%	38%	3%	5%	6% (Note: Daniel Betts, Jacques DuBose, Zeke Enriquez, Weston Martinez, Paul Rojas, Kyle Sinclair, Heather Tessmer, and Peggy Wardlaw with a combined 6%)	40%

==== Results ====
Republican primary results
Party	Candidate	Votes	%
Republican	Mark Teixeira	58,180	60.9
Republican	Jason Cahill	9,043	9.5
Republican	Trey Trainor	8,497	8.9
Republican	Michael Wheeler	6,593	6.9
Republican	Weston Martinez	2,320	2.4
Republican	Kyle Sinclair (withdrawn)	1,947	2.0
Republican	Daniel Betts	1,941	2.0
Republican	Peggy Wardlaw	1,872	2.0
Republican	Heather Tessmer	1,575	1.7
Republican	Paul Rojas	1,559	1.6
Republican	Zeke Enriquez	1,302	1.4
Republican	Jacques DuBose	673	0.7
Total votes		95,502	100.0

=== Democratic primary ===
==== Nominee ====
- Kristin Hook, scientist and nominee for this district in 2024

==== Eliminated in primary ====
- Gary Taylor, teacher
- Regina Vanburg, psychologist

==== Endorsements ====
Kristin Hook

Labor unions

- Texas AFL-CIO

Newspapers

- The Austin Chronicle
- San Antonio Express-News
Regina Vanburg

Newspapers

- Austin American-Statesman

==== Fundraising ====
Campaign finance reports as of February 11, 2026
Candidate	Raised	Spent	Cash on hand
Kristin Hook (D)	$100,800 (Note: $1,417 of this total was self-funded by Hook)	$28,308	$76,849
Gary Taylor (D)	$16,487	$12,591	$3,895
Regina Vanburg (D)	$11,872 (Note: $2,750 of this total was self-funded by Vanburg)	$9,416	$2,293
Source: Federal Election Commission

==== Results ====
Democratic primary results
Party	Candidate	Votes	%
Democratic	Kristin Hook	39,779	60.1
Democratic	Regina Vanburg	18,614	28.1
Democratic	Gary Taylor	7,847	11.8
Total votes		66,240	100.0

=== Independents ===
- Eldon Dan McQueen, former mayor of Corpus Chrsti

=== General election ===
==== Predictions ====
Source	Ranking	As of
Decision Desk HQ	Likely R	November 3, 2026
The Cook Political Report	Solid R	February 6, 2025
Inside Elections	Solid R	March 7, 2025
Sabato's Crystal Ball	Safe R	September 18, 2025
Silver Bulletin	Solid R	October 22, 2026

==== Fundraising ====
Campaign finance reports as of April 26, 2026
Candidate	Raised	Spent	Cash on hand
Mark Teixeira (R)	$3,662,596	$3,385,261	$277,335
Kristin Hook (D)	$154,023	$106,520	$51,860
Source: Federal Election Commission

==== Results ====
2026 Texas's 21st congressional district election
Party	Candidate	Votes	%	±%
Republican	Mark Teixeira			
Democratic	Kristin Hook			
Total votes				

== District 22 ==
2026 Texas's 22nd congressional district election
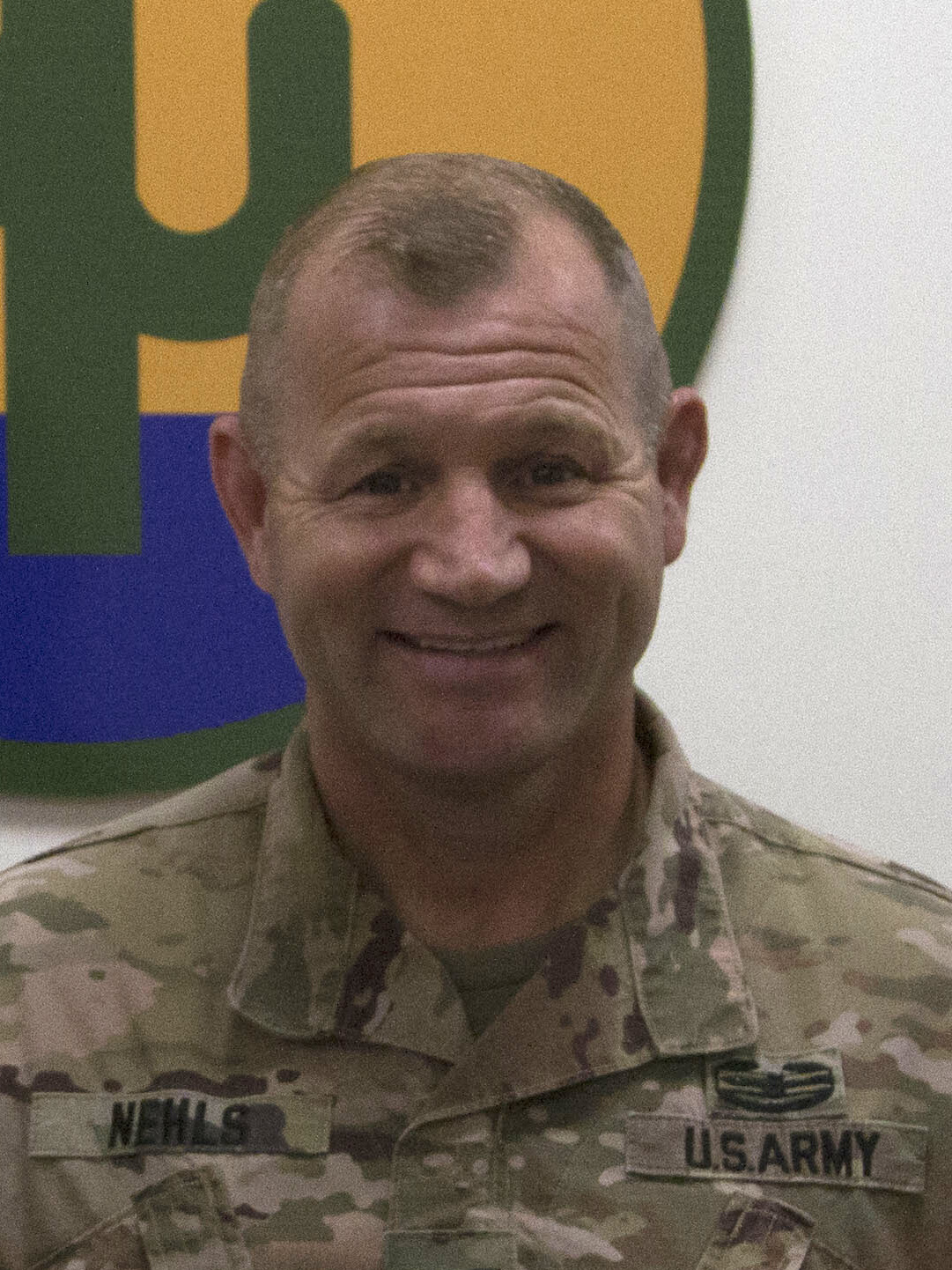

Nominee	Trever Nehls	Marquette Greene-Scott
Party	Republican	Democratic
Popular vote	150,166	139,611
Percentage	51.8%	48.2%
U.S. Representative before election
Troy Nehls
Republican
Elected U.S. Representative
Trever Nehls
Republican

Texas's 22nd congressional district boundary from the 2026 elections Interactive map version

The new 22nd district encompasses the southwest suburban corner of the Greater Houston metropolitan area across Harris, Fort Bend and Brazoria counties, including the southern Houston suburbs of Sugar Land, Rosenberg, Lake Jackson and Angleton, as well as the Katy and Fulshear areas in both Harris and Fort Bend counties. The incumbent is Republican Troy Nehls, who is not seeking reelection and was re-elected with 62.1% of the vote in 2024. That same year, Donald Trump won 59.9% and Ted Cruz 56.9% of the vote in the district, which is diverse with double-digit populations of White, Hispanic, Asian and Black residents (both voting age and overall).

=== Republican primary ===
==== Nominee ====
- Trever Nehls, former Fort Bend County constable from the 4th precinct (2013–2020) and brother of Troy Nehls

==== Eliminated in primary ====
- Rebecca Clark, geophysicist

==== Withdrawn ====
- Jacey Jetton, former state representative from the 26th district (2021–2025)

==== Declined ====
- Troy Nehls, incumbent U.S. representative (endorsed Trever Nehls)

==== Endorsements ====
Rebecca Clark

Newspapers

- Houston Chronicle
Trever Nehls

Executive branch officials

- Donald Trump, president of the United States (2017–2021, 2025–present) (previously endorsed Troy Nehls)

U.S. senators

- Ted Cruz, Texas (2013–present)

U.S. representatives

- Ronny Jackson, TX-13 (2021–present)
- Mike Johnson, speaker of the House (2023–present) from LA-04 (2017–present)
- Jim Jordan, OH-04 (2007–present)
- Troy Nehls, U.S. representative from Texas's 22nd congressional district (2021–present) (candidate's brother)
- Steve Scalise, House majority leader (2023–present) from LA-01 (2008–present)
- Randy Weber, TX-14 (2013–present)

Statewide officials

- Greg Abbott, governor of Texas (2015–present)
- Dan Patrick, lieutenant governor of Texas (2015–present)
Troy Nehls (declined)

Executive branch officials

- ~~Donald Trump, 45th and 47th president of the United States (2017–2021, 2025–present)~~ (switched endorsement to Trever Nehls after Troy Nehls withdrew)

==== Fundraising ====
Campaign finance reports as of February 11, 2026
Candidate	Raised	Spent	Cash on hand
Rebecca Clark (R)	$45,994 (Note: $15,000 of this total was self-funded by Clark)	$33,457	$12,536
Trever Nehls (R)	$108,938	$26,747	$82,191
Source: Federal Election Commission

==== Results ====
Republican primary results
Party	Candidate	Votes	%
Republican	Trever Nehls	47,839	75.7
Republican	Rebecca Clark	15,379	24.3
Total votes		63,218	100.0

=== Democratic primary ===
==== Nominee ====
- Marquette Greene-Scott, Iowa Colony city councilor and nominee for this district in 2024

==== Eliminated in primary ====
- Chris Fernandez, editor
- Sterling Gadison, engineer
- Robert Thomas, aerospace engineer
- Pearl Vuorinen, healthcare executive

==== Endorsements ====
Marquette Greene-Scott

Labor unions

- Texas AFL-CIO

Newspapers

- Houston Chronicle

==== Fundraising ====
Campaign finance reports as of February 11, 2026
Candidate	Raised	Spent	Cash on hand
Marquette Greene-Scott (D)	$36,570	$31,271	$3,938
Robert Thomas (D)	$5,400	$4,800	$600
Pearl Vuorinen (D)	$21,500	$14,307	$7,192
Source: Federal Election Commission

==== Results ====
Democratic primary results
Party	Candidate	Votes	%
Democratic	Marquette Greene-Scott	26,280	54.6
Democratic	Chris Fernandez	8,931	18.5
Democratic	Robert Thomas	7,269	15.1
Democratic	Pearl Vuorinen	3,093	6.4
Democratic	Sterling Gadison	2,574	5.3
Total votes		48,147	100.0

=== Third-party candidates ===
==== Filed paperwork ====
- Demile James (American Independent Party), HR recruiter

=== General election ===
==== Predictions ====
Source	Ranking	As of
Decision Desk HQ	Likely R	October 30, 2026
The Cook Political Report	Solid R	February 6, 2025
Inside Elections	Solid R	March 7, 2025
Sabato's Crystal Ball	Safe R	September 18, 2025
Silver Bulletin	Solid R	October 22, 2026

==== Fundraising ====
Campaign finance reports as of April 26, 2026
Candidate	Raised	Spent	Cash on hand
Trever Nehls (R)	$182,538	$146,145	$36,393
Marquette Greene-Scott (D)	$41,012	$40,531	$116
Source: Federal Election Commission

==== Results ====
2026 Texas's 22nd congressional district election
Party	Candidate	Votes	%	±%
Republican	Trever Nehls			
Democratic	Marquette Greene-Scott			
Total votes				

== District 23 ==
2026 Texas's 23rd congressional district election

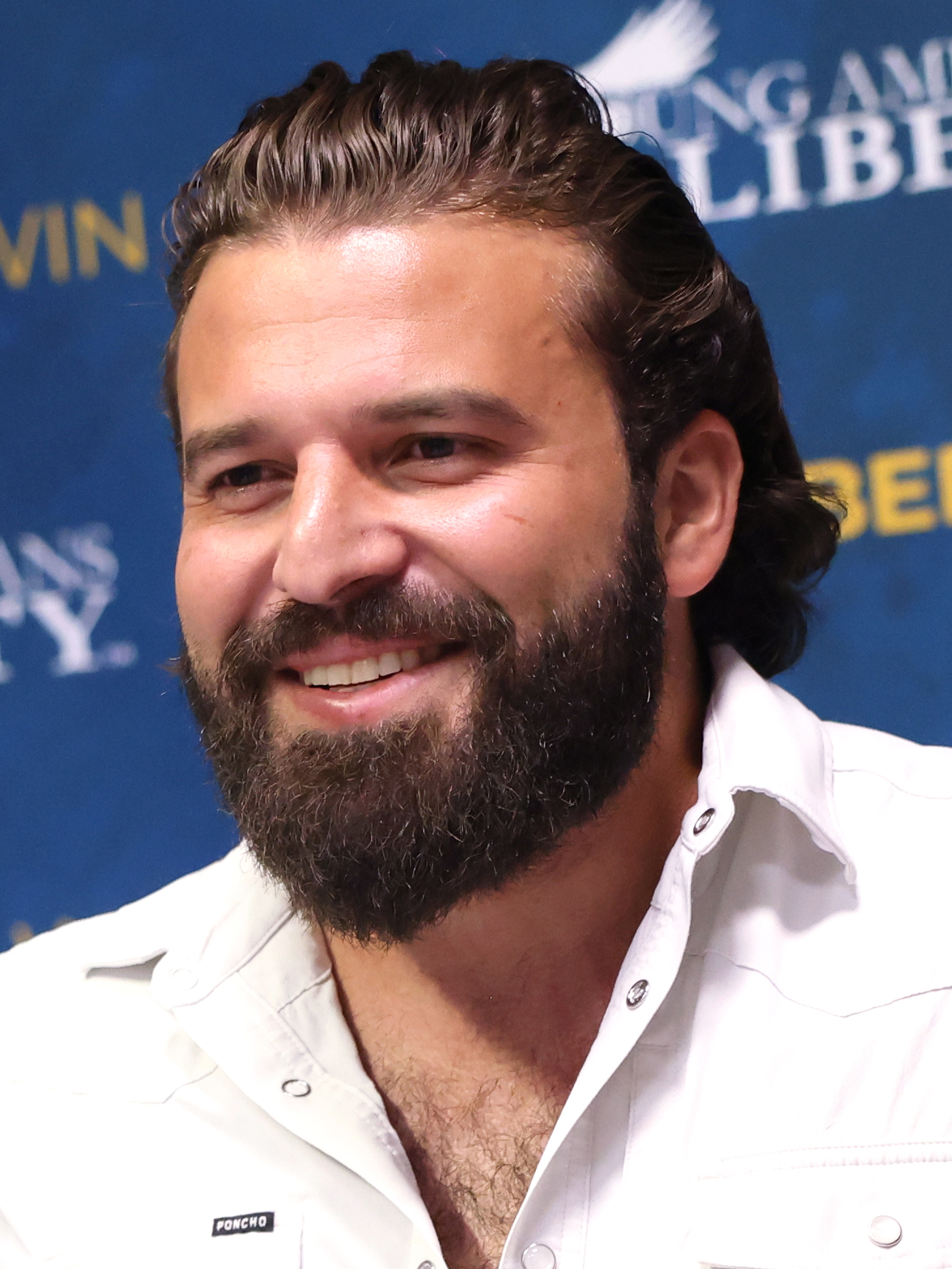
Nominee	Katy Padilla Stout	Brandon Herrera
Party	Democratic	Republican
Popular vote	142,116	119,822
Percentage	52.1%	44%
- County results Stout: 40–50% 50–60% 60–70% 70–80% Herrera: 50–60% 60–70% 70–80% 80–90%
U.S. Representative before election
Tony Gonzales
Republican
Elected U.S. Representative
Katy Padilla Stout
Democratic

Texas's 23rd congressional district boundary from the 2026 elections Interactive map version

The new 23rd district covers southwestern Texas, including the Big Bend, and stretches eastward through Del Rio and Uvalde to the northern San Antonio suburbs including the west side of Stone Oak, Shavano Park and Camp Bullis with a small finger extending eastward to Lackland AFB in southwest San Antonio, and also westward to the eastern fringes of the El Paso suburbs. The majority Hispanic district gave Donald Trump and Ted Cruz 56.8% and 52.9% of the vote, respectively, in 2024.

The incumbent was Republican Tony Gonzales, who was re-elected with 62.3% of the vote in 2024. Republican leaders called on Gonzales to end his re-election campaign after he admitted to having a sexual relationship with a former staff member who later died by suicide, following his earlier denial of the allegations. Gonzales ended his campaign on March 5, leading to the cancellation of the runoff and making challenger Brandon Herrera the Republican nominee.

Gonzales later resigned on April 13 after he was expected to face an expulsion vote alongside Democratic representative Eric Swalwell, who was accused of sexual assault. Swalwell similarly had announced his resignation on April 13, hours before Gonzales' announcement. Despite multiple other vacancies which occurred around the same time having been filled by August, governor Greg Abbott never called an emergency special election to fill this seat, leaving it vacant until January 2027.

=== Republican primary ===
==== Nominee ====
- Brandon Herrera, YouTuber, firearms manufacturer, and candidate for this district in 2024

==== Advanced to runoff ====
- Tony Gonzales, incumbent U.S. representative (withdrew before runoff)

==== Eliminated in primary ====
- Keith Barton, veteran, construction equipment manager
- Quico Canseco, former U.S. representative (2011–2013) and candidate for the 21st district in 2018

==== Withdrawn ====
- Zeke Enriquez, U.S. Marine Corps veteran (ran in the 21st district)
- Susan Storey Rubio, rancher

==== Declined ====
- Grant Moody, Bexar County commissioner from the 3rd precinct
- Kyle Sinclair, former vice chair of the Bexar County Republican Party, candidate for the 28th district in 2024 and nominee for the 20th district in 2022 (ran in the 21st district)

==== Endorsements ====
Brandon Herrera

Executive branch officials

- Donald Trump, president of the United States (2017–2021, 2025–present) (previously endorsed Gonzales)

U.S. representatives

- Lauren Boebert, CO-04 (2021–present)
- Eli Crane, AZ-02 (2023–present)
- Tom Emmer, House majority whip (2023–present) from MN–08 (2015–present) (previously endorsed Gonzales)
- Marjorie Taylor Greene, former GA-14 (2021–2026)
- Pat Harrigan, NC-10 (2025–present)
- Richard Hudson, NC-09 (2023–present)
- Mike Johnson, speaker of the House (2023–present) from LA-04 (2017–present) (previously endorsed Gonzales)
- Anna Paulina Luna, FL-13 (2023–present)
- Mary Miller IL-15 (2021–present)
- Chip Roy, TX-21 (2019–present)
- Steve Scalise, House majority leader (2023–present) from LA–01 (2008–present) (previously endorsed Gonzales)

State legislators

- Wesley Virdell, state representative from the 53rd district (2025–present)

Individuals

- Benny Johnson, political commentator
- James Fishback, 2026 Florida gubernatorial candidate and conservative political activist
- Tim Pool, political commentator
- Kyle Rittenhouse, Kenosha unrest shooter

Organizations

- Freedom Caucus Fund
- Gun Owners of America
- MAHA Action
- National Association for Gun Rights
- National Republican Congressional Committee
- Republican Liberty Caucus
- Republicans for National Renewal
- Rocky Mountain Gun Owners
- Young Republicans of Texas
Tony Gonzales (withdrawn)

Executive branch officials

- ~~Donald Trump, president of the United States (2017–2021, 2025–present)~~ (endorsed Herrera after Gonzales dropped out)

U.S. representatives

- ~~Tom Emmer, House majority whip (2023–present) from MN–08 (2015–present)~~ (endorsed Herrera after Gonzales dropped out)
- ~~Mike Johnson, speaker of the House (2023–present) from LA-04 (2017–present)~~ (endorsed Herrera after Gonzales dropped out)
- ~~Steve Scalise, House majority leader (2023–present) from LA–01 (2008–present)~~ (endorsed Herrera after Gonzales dropped out)

Organizations

- ~~AIPAC~~ (endorsement rescinded)

Newspapers

- ~~San Antonio Express-News~~ (endorsement rescinded)
Declined to endorse

Organizations

- AIPAC (previously endorsed Gonzales)

Newspapers

- San Antonio Express-News (previously endorsed Gonzales)

==== Fundraising ====
Campaign finance reports as of February 11, 2026
Candidate	Raised	Spent	Cash on hand
Quico Canseco (R)	$80,050 (Note: $48,050 of this total was self-funded by Canseco)	$6,250	$201,621
Tony Gonzales (R)	$1,949,598	$1,962,043	$1,446,542
Brandon Herrera (R)	$868,568 (Note: $100,000 of this total was self-funded by Herrera)	$866,742	$9,866
Source: Federal Election Commission

==== Polling ====
Poll source	Date(s) administered	Sample size	Margin of error	Tony Gonzales	Brandon Herrera	Other	Undecided
Political Intelligence (Note: Poll sponsored by Herrera's campaign)	February 18–20, 2026	543 (LV)	–	21%	45%	8% (Note: Barton and Canseco with 4%)	26%
Political Intelligence	December 17–22, 2025	422 (LV)	–	34%	43%	–	23%
Trafalgar Group (R)	October 31 – November 1, 2025	605 (LV)	± 3.9%	40%	35%	–	24%

==== Results ====
2026 GOP primary results by county: Gonzales: 30–40%; 40–50%; 50–60%; Herrera: 40–50%; 50–60%; 60–70%; Tie

Republican primary results
Party	Candidate	Votes	%
Republican	Brandon Herrera	23,932	43.3
Republican	Tony Gonzales (incumbent)	23,073	41.8
Republican	Keith Barton	4,696	8.5
Republican	Quico Canseco	3,562	6.4
Total votes		55,263	100.0

=== Democratic primary ===
==== Nominee ====
- Katy Padilla Stout, attorney

==== Eliminated in primary ====
- Gretel Enck, community organizer and writer
- Santos Limon, civil engineer and nominee for this district in 2024
- Bruce Richardson, accountant

==== Endorsements ====
Katy Padilla Stout

U.S. representatives

- Charlie Gonzalez, former TX-20 (1999–2013)

Labor unions

- Texas AFL-CIO

Newspapers

- San Antonio Express-News

==== Fundraising ====
Campaign finance reports as of February 11, 2026
Candidate	Raised	Spent	Cash on hand
Gretel Enck (D)	$64,258 (Note: $20,000 of this total was self-funded by Enck)	$46,464	$17,793
Santos Limon (D) (Note: Has not filed since Q2 2025)	$356,755 (Note: $354,400 of this total was self-funded by Limon)	$6,815	$349,940
Katy Padilla Stout (D)	$44,841 (Note: $7,392 of this total was self-funded by Stout)	$36,370	$8,470
Source: Federal Election Commission

==== Debate ====
2026 Texas' 23rd congressional district Democratic primary candidate forum
No.	Date	Host	Moderator	Link	Democratic	Democratic	Democratic	Democratic
Key: P Participant A Absent N Not invited I Invited W Withdrawn								
Key: P Participant A Absent N Not invited I Invited W Withdrawn					Gretel Enck	Santos Limon	Katy Padilla Stout	Bruce Richardson
1	Jan. 17, 2026	State Democratic Committee CD 23	Reagan Stone	YouTube	P	P	P	P

==== Results ====
2026 Democratic primary results by county: Stout: 30–40%; 40–50%; 50–60%; 60–70%; Limon: 30–40%; 40–50%; 50–60%; Richardson: 50–60%; Enck: 30–40%; 40–50%

Democratic primary results
Party	Candidate	Votes	%
Democratic	Katy Padilla Stout	30,828	52.1
Democratic	Santos Limon	16,077	27.1
Democratic	Bruce Richardson	6,968	11.8
Democratic	Gretel Enck	5,349	9.0
Total votes		59,222	100.0

=== Independents ===
==== Filed paperwork ====
- Patti Hale Ashe
- Veronica Williams, licensed professional counselor

=== General election ===
==== Predictions ====
Source	Ranking	As of
Decision Desk HQ	Lean R	October 26, 2026
The Cook Political Report	Lean R	October 23, 2026
Inside Elections	Likely R	March 12, 2026
Sabato's Crystal Ball	Lean R	October 20, 2026
Silver Bulletin	Tossup	October 22, 2026

==== Post-primary endorsements ====
Brandon Herrera (R)

Executive branch officials

- Donald Trump, 45th and 47th president of the United States (2017–2021, 2025–present)

U.S. representatives

- Tom Emmer, House majority whip (2023–present) from MN–08 (2015–present)
- Mike Johnson, speaker of the House (2023–present) from LA-04 (2017–present)
- Lisa McClain, Chair of the House Republican Conference (2025–present) from MI−09 (2021–present)
- Steve Scalise, House majority leader (2023–present) from LA–01 (2008–present)

Organizations

- MAHA Action
- MAHA PAC
Katy Padilla Stout (D)

Executive branch officials

- Pete Buttigieg, former secretary of transportation (2021–2025)

U.S. representatives

- Greg Casar, TX-35 (2023–present) and chair of the Congressional Progressive Caucus
- Maxwell Frost, FL-10 (2023–present)
- Pramila Jayapal, WA-7 (2017–present)

Labor unions

- Texas American Federation of Teachers

Organizations

- CHC BOLD PAC
- Congressional Progressive Caucus PAC
- EMILYs List
- Giffords
- J Street
- MoveOn
- Our Revolution

==== Fundraising ====
Campaign finance reports as of September 30, 2026
Candidate	Raised	Spent	Cash on hand
Brandon Herrera (R)	$3,108,608	$2,562,475	$554,174
Katy Padilla Stout (D)	$976,704	$548,625	$428,078
Source: Federal Election Commission

==== Polling ====
Poll source	Date(s) administered	Sample size	Margin of error	Brandon Herrera (R)	Katy Padilla Stout (D)	Undecided
Normington Petts (D)	October 5–7, 2026	400 (LV)	–	46%	46%	8%
Public Policy Polling (D)	March 10–11, 2026	521 (V)	–	42%	40%	18%

Hypothetical polling

Generic Republican vs. generic Democrat

Poll source	Date(s) administered	Sample size	Margin of error	Generic Republican	Generic Democrat	Undecided
Public Policy Polling (D)	March 10–11, 2026	521 (V)	–	47%	45%	8%

==== Debate ====
2026 Texas' 23rd congressional district debate
No.	Date	Host	Moderator	Link	Republican	Democratic
Key: P Participant A Absent N Not invited I Invited W Withdrawn						
Key: P Participant A Absent N Not invited I Invited W Withdrawn					Brandon Herrera	Katy Padilla Stout
1	Oct. 13, 2026		Robert Holguin; Yami Virgin	YouTube	P	P

==== Results ====
2026 Texas's 23rd congressional district election
Party	Candidate	Votes	%	±%
Republican	Brandon Herrera			
Democratic	Katy Padilla Stout			
Total votes				

== District 24 ==
2026 Texas's 24th congressional district election
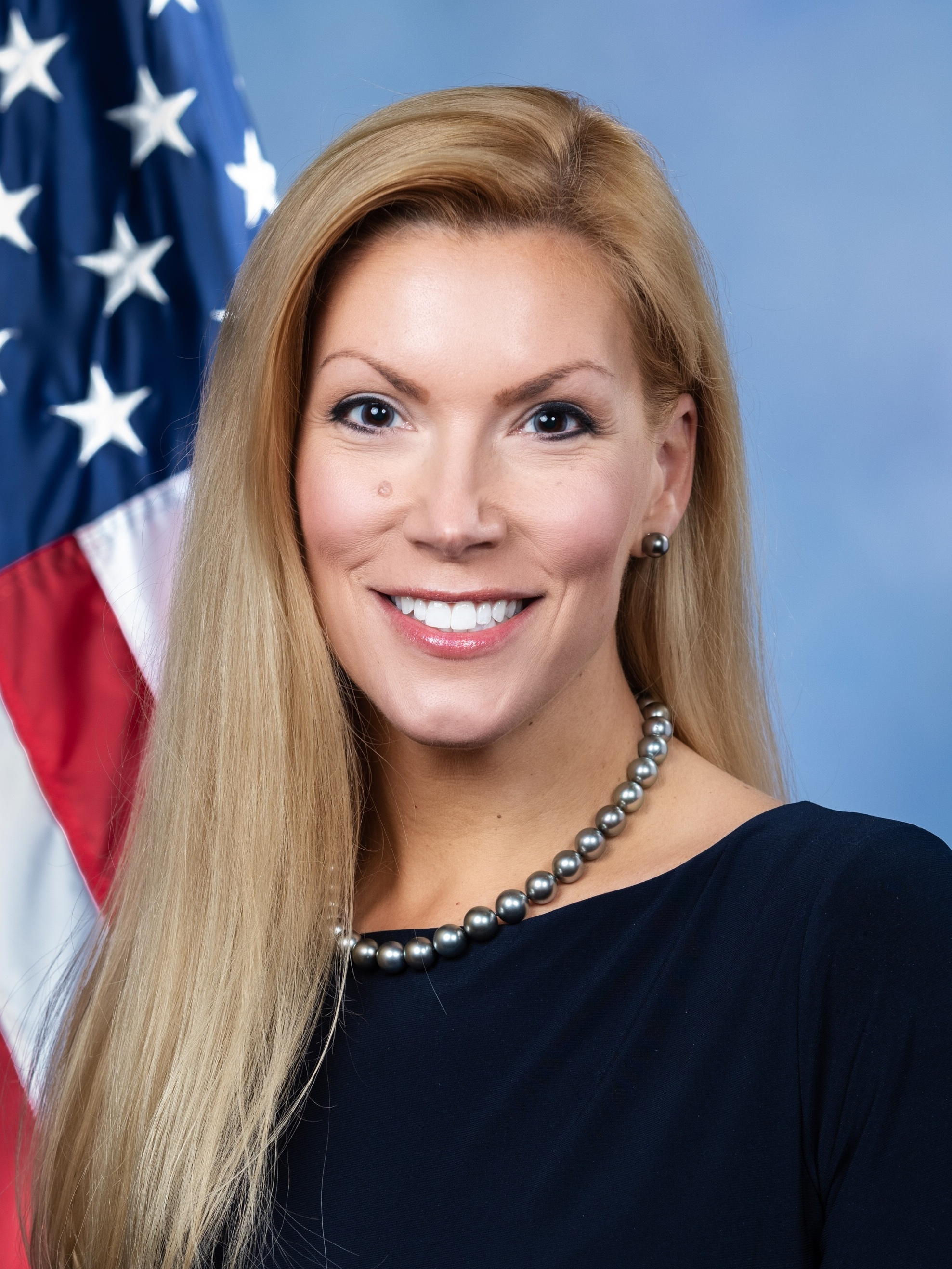

Nominee	Beth Van Duyne	Kevin Burge
Party	Republican	Democratic
Popular vote	171,751	149,697
Percentage	53.4%	46.6%
U.S. Representative before election
Beth Van Duyne
Republican
Julie Johnson
Democratic
Elected U.S. Representative
Beth Van Duyne
Republican

Texas's 24th congressional district boundary from the 2026 elections Interactive map version

The new 24th district, centered on Dallas Fort Worth International Airport in the heart of the Dallas–Fort Worth metroplex, encompasses the suburbs north of Fort Worth and Dallas, including Grapevine, Bedford, North Richland Hills and Southlake in northeast Tarrant County, and the wealthy Park Cities north of downtown Dallas, as well as the neighboring Knox Park and Lower Greenville neighborhoods and most of north Dallas (including Preston Hollow) in Dallas itself and the Dallas County suburbs of Farmers Branch and Coppell.

Due to redistricting, the district has two incumbents, Republican Beth Van Duyne, who was re-elected with 60.3% of the vote in 2024, and Democrat Julie Johnson, who was elected with 61.9% of the vote in 2024 from the old 32nd District. Donald Trump won 57.1% of the vote in this affluent district, which also gave Ted Cruz 54.6% of the vote that same year against Democrat Colin Allred, whom Johnson succeeded in Congress. Johnson has since decided to seek reelection in the newly redrawn 33rd district (see below).

=== Republican primary ===
==== Nominee ====
- Beth Van Duyne, incumbent U.S. representative

==== Endorsements ====
Beth Van Duyne

Executive branch officials

- Donald Trump, 45th and 47th president of the United States (2017–2021, 2025–present)

Statewide officials

- Greg Abbott, governor of Texas (2015–present)

Organizations

- AIPAC
- Log Cabin Republicans

==== Fundraising ====
Campaign finance reports as of February 11, 2026
Candidate	Raised	Spent	Cash on hand
Beth Van Duyne (R)	$1,783,552	$1,107,736	$2,636,687
Source: Federal Election Commission

==== Results ====
Republican primary results
Party	Candidate	Votes	%
Republican	Beth Van Duyne (incumbent)	71,506	100.0
Total votes		71,506	100.0

=== Democratic primary ===
==== Nominee ====
- Kevin Burge, IT security specialist

==== Eliminated in runoff ====
- TJ Ware, entrepreneur

==== Eliminated in primary ====
- Jon Buchwald, entrepreneur

==== Declined ====
- Julie Johnson, incumbent U.S. representative (ran in the 33rd district)

==== Endorsements ====
Kevin Burge

Labor unions

- Texas AFL-CIO

==== Fundraising ====
Campaign finance reports as of February 11, 2026
Candidate	Raised	Spent	Cash on hand
Jon Buchwald (D)	$195,319 (Note: $175,867 of this total was self-funded by Buchwald)	$150,254	$45,065
Kevin Burge (D)	$119,926	$94,380	$25,546
TJ Ware (D)	$95,181 (Note: $60,170 of this total was self-funded by Ware)	$88,744	$831
Source: Federal Election Commission

==== Results ====
Democratic primary results
Party	Candidate	Votes	%
Democratic	Kevin Burge	28,968	48.0
Democratic	TJ Ware	15,774	26.1
Democratic	Jon Buchwald	15,612	25.9
Total votes		60,354	100.0

==== Runoff results ====
Democratic primary runoff results
Party	Candidate	Votes	%
Democratic	Kevin Burge	10,656	78.1
Democratic	TJ Ware	2,983	21.9
Total votes		13,639	100.0

=== General election ===
==== Predictions ====
Source	Ranking	As of
Decision Desk HQ	Likely R	July 14, 2026
The Cook Political Report	Solid R	February 6, 2025
Inside Elections	Solid R	March 7, 2025
Sabato's Crystal Ball	Safe R	September 18, 2025
Silver Bulletin	Likely R	October 22, 2026

==== Fundraising ====
Campaign finance reports as of April 26, 2026
Candidate	Raised	Spent	Cash on hand
Beth Van Duyne (R)	$2,226,054	$1,360,432	$2,826,494
Kevin Burge (D)	$164,571	$148,875	$17,696
Source: Federal Election Commission

==== Results ====
2026 Texas's 24th congressional district election
Party	Candidate	Votes	%	±%
Republican	Beth Van Duyne (incumbent)			
Democratic	Kevin Burge			
Total votes				

== District 25 ==
2026 Texas's 25th congressional district election
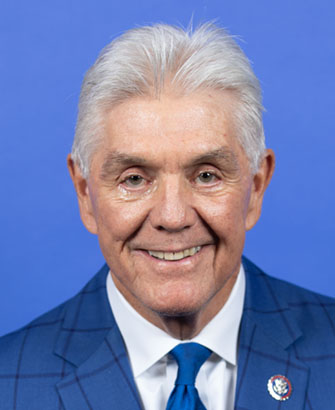

Nominee	Roger Williams	Dione Sims
Party	Republican	Democratic
Popular vote	142,721	122,854
Percentage	53.7%	46.3%
U.S. Representative before election
Marc Veasey
Democratic
Roger Williams
Republican
Elected U.S. Representative
Roger Williams
Republican

Texas's 25th congressional district boundary from the 2026 elections Interactive map version

The new 25th district runs from northern Arlington and southern and eastern Fort Worth in Tarrant County, whose portion is the only portion of the district considered even remotely competitive (and in fact, favorable) to Democrats, out to several heavily Republican exurban and rural areas south and west of Fort Worth and just east of Abilene, including Cleburne, Granbury, Willow Park, Mineral Wells, Stephenville, Jacksboro and Eastland.

Due to redistricting, the district has two incumbents, Republican Roger Williams, who was re-elected unopposed in 2024, and Democrat Marc Veasey, who was re-elected with 68.7% of the vote in 2024. Veasey, the incumbent from the old 33rd district (see below) decided to not seek reelection, instead pursuing a short-lived bid for Tarrant County judge before dropping out of that race. Donald Trump won 61.4% of the vote in this district in 2024, which also saw Ted Cruz win 58.4% of the vote.

=== Republican primary ===
==== Nominee ====
- Roger Williams, incumbent U.S. representative

==== Endorsements ====
Roger Williams

Executive branch officials

- Donald Trump, 45th and 47th president of the United States (2017–2021, 2025–present)

Statewide officials

- Greg Abbott, governor of Texas (2015–present)

Organizations

- AIPAC

==== Fundraising ====
Campaign finance reports as of February 11, 2026
Candidate	Raised	Spent	Cash on hand
Roger Williams (R)	$989,054	$690,710	$869,845
Source: Federal Election Commission

==== Results ====
Republican primary results
Party	Candidate	Votes	%
Republican	Roger Williams (incumbent)	60,296	100.0
Total votes		60,296	100.0

=== Democratic primary ===
==== Nominee ====
- Dione Sims, non-profit founder

==== Eliminated in primary ====
- William Marks, retired U.S. Navy commander

==== Declined ====
- Marc Veasey, incumbent U.S. representative (ran for Tarrant County judge)

==== Fundraising ====
Campaign finance reports as of February 11, 2026
Candidate	Raised	Spent	Cash on hand
William Marks (D)	$70,772 (Note: $30,000 of this total was self-funded by Marks)	$38,647	$32,125
Source: Federal Election Commission

==== Results ====
Democratic primary results
Party	Candidate	Votes	%
Democratic	Dione Sims	32,388	60.5
Democratic	William Marks	21,135	39.5
Total votes		53,523	100.0

=== General election ===
==== Predictions ====
Source	Ranking	As of
Decision Desk HQ	Safe R	July 14, 2026
The Cook Political Report	Solid R	February 6, 2025
Inside Elections	Solid R	March 7, 2025
Sabato's Crystal Ball	Safe R	September 18, 2025
Silver Bulletin	Solid R	October 22, 2026

==== Fundraising ====
Campaign finance reports as of April 26, 2026
Candidate	Raised	Spent	Cash on hand
Roger Williams (R)	$1,301,335	$767,016	$1,105,820
Dione Sims (D)	$0	$0	$0
Source: Federal Election Commission

==== Results ====
2026 Texas's 25th congressional district election
Party	Candidate	Votes	%	±%
Republican	Roger Williams (incumbent)			
Democratic	Dione Sims			
Total votes				

== District 26 ==
2026 Texas's 26th congressional district election
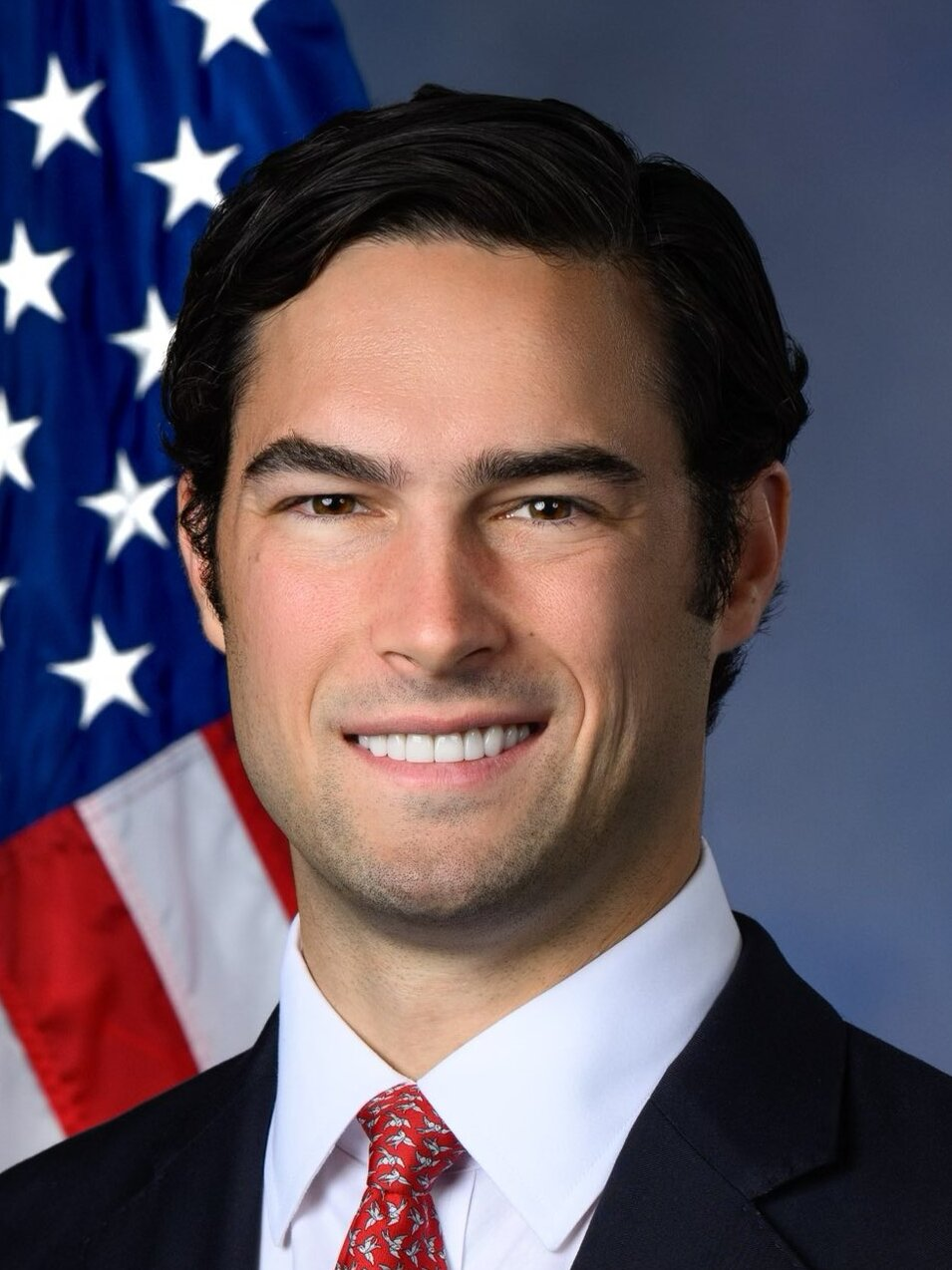

Nominee	Brandon Gill	Steven Shook
Party	Republican	Democratic
Popular vote	183,084	148,400
Percentage	54.5%	44.2%
U.S. Representative before election
Brandon Gill
Republican
Elected U.S. Representative
Brandon Gill
Republican

Texas's 26th congressional district boundary from the 2026 elections Interactive map version

The new 26th district is based in the northwestern corner of the Dallas–Fort Worth metroplex, centering on southern and eastern Denton County (including the county's share of Carrollton along with all of Lewisville, Flower Mound and Little Elm) and including Cooke County (Gainesville) and the southern two-thirds of Wise County including Decatur. The incumbent is Republican Brandon Gill, who was elected with 62.1% of the vote in 2024. That same year, the district gave 61.2% of the vote to Donald Trump and 58.4% to Ted Cruz.

=== Republican primary ===
==== Nominee ====
- Brandon Gill, incumbent U.S. representative

==== Eliminated in primary ====
- Robert Chick, managing director

==== Endorsements ====
Brandon Gill

Executive branch officials

- Donald Trump, 45th and 47th president of the United States (2017–2021, 2025–present)

Statewide officials

- Greg Abbott, governor of Texas (2015–present)

Organizations

- AIPAC
- Turning Point Action

==== Fundraising ====
Campaign finance reports as of February 11, 2026
Candidate	Raised	Spent	Cash on hand
Brandon Gill (R)	$2,423,547	$1,925,433	$625,937
Source: Federal Election Commission

==== Results ====
Republican primary results
Party	Candidate	Votes	%
Republican	Brandon Gill (incumbent)	73,610	91.1
Republican	Robert Chick	7,169	8.9
Total votes		80,779	100.0

=== Democratic primary ===
==== Nominee ====
- Steven Shook, nurse practitioner

==== Eliminated in primary ====
- Ernest Lineberger, industrial engineer and nominee for this district in 2024

==== Endorsements ====
Ernest Lineberger

Labor unions

- Texas AFL-CIO
Steven Shook

Organizations

- Track AIPAC

==== Fundraising ====
Campaign finance reports as of February 11, 2026
Candidate	Raised	Spent	Cash on hand
Ernest Lineberger (D)	$114,773 (Note: $5,000 of this total was self-funded by Lineberger)	$110,621	$7,644
Steven Shook (D)	$10,740	$10,298	$465
Source: Federal Election Commission

==== Results ====
Democratic primary results
Party	Candidate	Votes	%
Democratic	Steven Shook	29,172	51.1
Democratic	Ernest Lineberger	27,964	48.9
Total votes		57,136	100.0

=== Libertarian convention ===
==== Nominee ====
- Phil Gray, property manager and nominee in 2024

=== General election ===
==== Predictions ====
Source	Ranking	As of
Decision Desk HQ	Safe R	July 14, 2026
The Cook Political Report	Solid R	February 6, 2025
Inside Elections	Solid R	March 7, 2025
Sabato's Crystal Ball	Safe R	September 18, 2025
Silver Bulletin	Solid R	October 22, 2026

==== Fundraising ====
Campaign finance reports as of September 30, 2026
Candidate	Raised	Spent	Cash on hand
Brandon Gill (R)	$7,293,891	$5,466,469	$1,955,246
Steven Shook (D)	$32,061	$29,214	$2,515
Source: Federal Election Commission

==== Results ====
2026 Texas's 26th congressional district election
Party	Candidate	Votes	%	±%
Republican	Brandon Gill (incumbent)			
Democratic	Steven Shook			
Libertarian	Phil Gray			
Total votes				

== District 27 ==
2026 Texas's 27th congressional district election
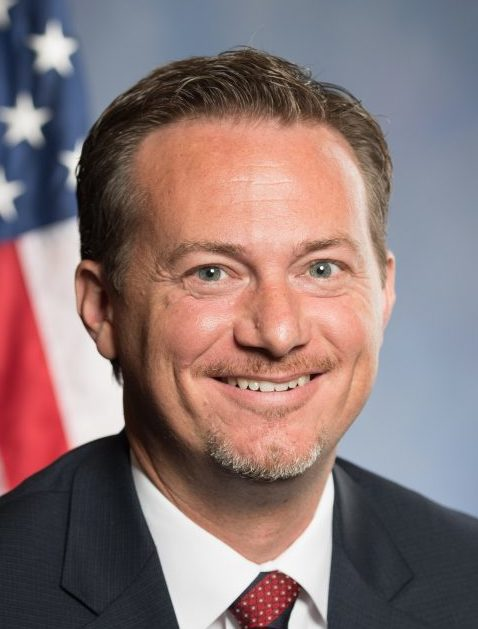

Nominee	Michael Cloud	Tanya Lloyd
Party	Republican	Democratic
Popular vote	144,471	137,928
Percentage	51.2%	48.8%
- Lloyd: 50–60% 60–70% 70–80% Cloud: 60–70% 70–80% 80–90%
U.S. Representative before election
Michael Cloud
Republican
Elected U.S. Representative
Michael Cloud
Republican

Texas's 27th congressional district boundary from the 2026 elections Interactive map version

The new 27th district stretches across the Coastal Bend, from downtown Corpus Christi and Port Aransas in the south, along with Victoria and the rural fringes of the Greater Houston area including Brenham, Bay City and Sealy, extending westward to La Grange along with the southern and eastern suburbs of Austin including Bastrop, Kyle and Lockhart along with an eastern sliver of Travis County (including the Circuit of the Americas).

The incumbent is Republican Michael Cloud, who was re-elected with 66.0% of the vote in 2024. A plurality White district whose voting age population is more than 40% Hispanic, Donald Trump won 60% of the vote and Ted Cruz 57.1% in 2024.

=== Republican primary ===
==== Nominee ====
- Michael Cloud, incumbent U.S. representative

==== Eliminated in primary ====
- Chris Hatley, U.S. Army veteran

==== Endorsements ====
Michael Cloud

Executive branch officials

- Donald Trump, 45th and 47th president of the United States (2017–2021, 2025–present)

Statewide officials

- Greg Abbott, governor of Texas (2015–present)

Organizations

- Turning Point Action

Newspapers

- Austin American-Statesman

==== Fundraising ====
Campaign finance reports as of February 11, 2026
Candidate	Raised	Spent	Cash on hand
Michael Cloud (R)	$738,192	$649,442	$225,62
Chris Hatley (R)	$47,114 (Note: $41,067 of this total was self-funded by Hatley)	$390	$46,724
Source: Federal Election Commission

==== Results ====
Republican primary results
Party	Candidate	Votes	%
Republican	Michael Cloud (incumbent)	49,156	73.0
Republican	Chris Hatley	18,215	27.0
Total votes		67,371	100.0

=== Democratic primary ===
==== Nominee ====
- Tanya Lloyd, teacher and nominee for this district in 2024

==== Eliminated in primary ====
- Eustaquio Castro-Mendoza, U.S. Navy veteran
- Wayne Raasch, teacher and candidate for the 22nd district in 2024

==== Endorsements ====
Tanya Lloyd

Labor unions

- Texas AFL-CIO

Organizations

- Track AIPAC

Newspapers

- Austin American-Statesman
- The Austin Chronicle

==== Fundraising ====
Campaign finance reports as of February 11, 2026
Candidate	Raised	Spent	Cash on hand
Tanya Lloyd (D)	$112,844	$100,987	$12,044
Source: Federal Election Commission

==== Results ====
Democratic primary results
Party	Candidate	Votes	%
Democratic	Tanya Lloyd	35,729	63.1
Democratic	Eustaquio Castro-Mendoza	16,657	29.4
Democratic	Wayne Raasch	4,227	7.5
Total votes		56,613	100.0

=== Third parties and independents ===
==== Declared ====
- Dan McQueen (Independent), former mayor of Corpus Christi (2016–2017)

=== General election ===
==== Predictions ====
Source	Ranking	As of
Decision Desk HQ	Likely R	September 8, 2026
The Cook Political Report	Solid R	February 6, 2025
Inside Elections	Solid R	March 7, 2025
Sabato's Crystal Ball	Safe R	September 18, 2025
Silver Bulletin	Solid R	October 22, 2026

==== Fundraising ====
Campaign finance reports as of April 26, 2026
Candidate	Raised	Spent	Cash on hand
Michael Cloud (R)	$902,570	$759,611	$279,837
Tanya Lloyd (D)	$122,818	$114,770	$8,234
Dan McQueen (I)	$0	$0	$0
Source: Federal Election Commission

==== Results ====
2026 Texas's 27th congressional district election
Party	Candidate	Votes	%	±%
Republican	Michael Cloud (incumbent)			
Democratic	Tanya Lloyd			
Independent	Dan McQueen			
Total votes				

== District 28 ==
2026 Texas's 28th congressional district election
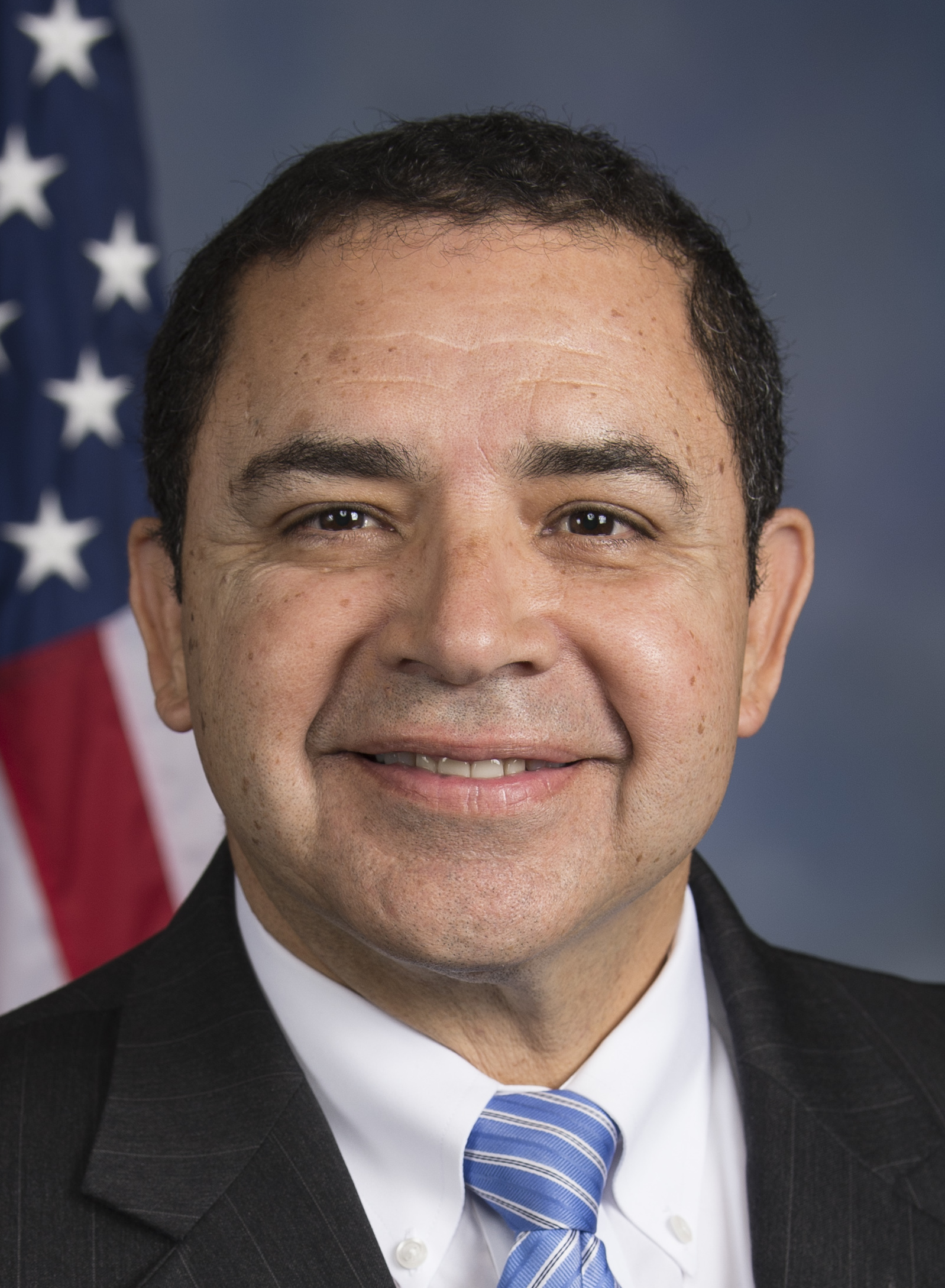

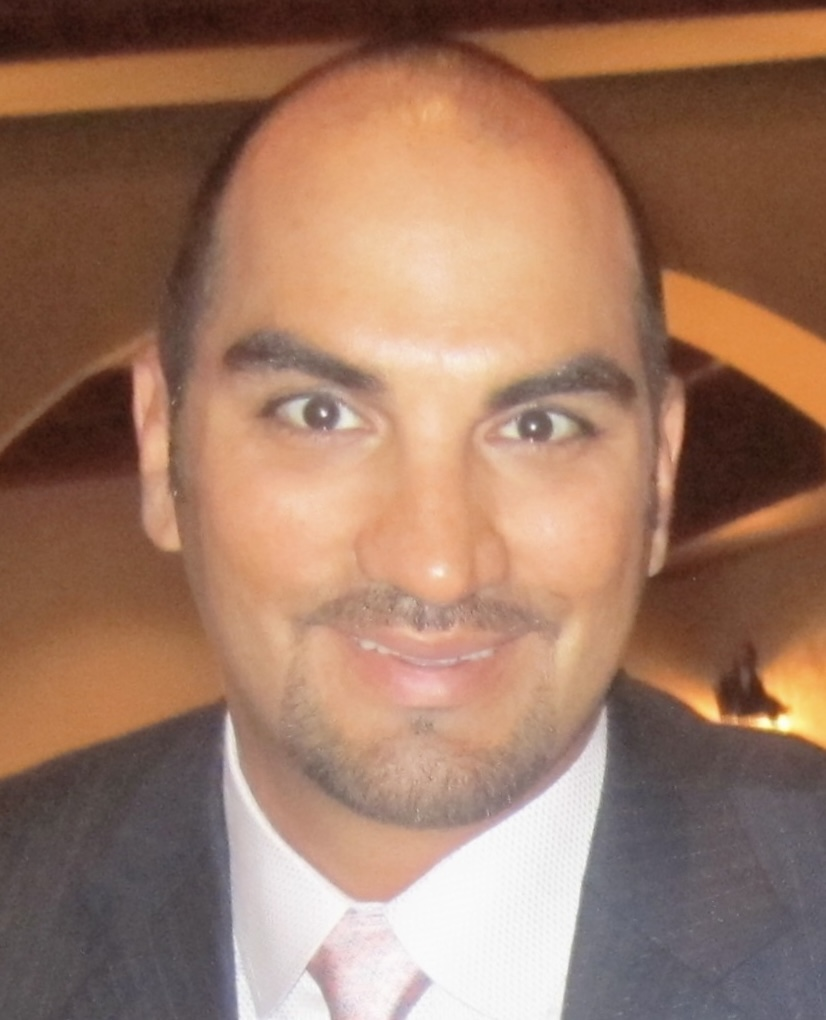
Nominee	Henry Cuellar	Tano Tijerina
Party	Democratic	Republican
Popular vote	113,315	51,065
Percentage	65.8%	29.6%
- Cuellar: 50–60% 60–70% 70–80% Tijerina: 50–60% 70–80%
U.S. Representative before election
Henry Cuellar
Democratic
Elected U.S. Representative
Henry Cuellar
Democratic

Texas's 28th congressional district boundary from the 2026 elections Interactive map version

The new 28th district is based in the Laredo area and stretches south to McAllen in the Rio Grande Valley and north to Atascosa County in the San Antonio area. The incumbent is Democrat Henry Cuellar, who was re-elected with 52.8% of the vote in 2024.

Historically a heavily Democratic district, Donald Trump won 54.8% of the vote in this overwhelmingly Hispanic district in 2024, which also saw Ted Cruz win a plurality of 48.8% (and a vote margin of only 228 votes) that same year; the district previously gave Democrats Joe Biden 54.3% in 2020 and Hillary Clinton 66.4% in 2016. In U.S. Senate races, John Cornyn lost the district twice in 2014 and 2020 for his seat, as did Cruz in his seat in 2018 against Beto O'Rourke, who won 65.8% of the vote that year.

=== Democratic primary ===
==== Nominee ====
- Henry Cuellar, incumbent U.S. representative

==== Eliminated in primary ====
- Andrew Vantine, businessman
- Ricardo Villarreal, physician and candidate for the 21st district in 2022

==== Endorsements ====
Henry Cuellar

Organizations

- AIPAC
- Democratic Majority for Israel

==== Fundraising ====
Campaign finance reports as of February 11, 2026
Candidate	Raised	Spent	Cash on hand
Henry Cuellar (D)	$1,189,858 (Note: $238,000 of this total was self-funded by Cuellar)	$754,500	$483,316
Ricardo Villarreal (D)	$64,098 (Note: $56,906 of this total was self-funded by Villarreal)	$27,174	$36,924
Source: Federal Election Commission

==== Results ====
Democratic primary results
Party	Candidate	Votes	%
Democratic	Henry Cuellar (incumbent)	39,228	58.1
Democratic	Ricardo Villarreal	24,968	37.0
Democratic	Andrew Vantine	3,375	5.0
Total votes		67,571	100.0

=== Republican primary ===
==== Nominee ====
- Tano Tijerina, Webb County judge (Note: County executive) (2014–present)

==== Eliminated in primary ====
- Eileen Day, businesswoman

==== Withdrawn ====
- Josh Cortez, former advisor to U.S. representative Monica De La Cruz (ran in the 35th district)
- Mayra Flores, former U.S. representative from the 34th district (2022–2023) (ran in the 34th district)
- Jay Furman, physician and nominee for this district in 2024 (ran in the 35th district)

==== Endorsements ====
Tano Tijerina

Executive branch officials

- Donald Trump, 45th and 47th president of the United States (2017–2021, 2025–present)

U.S. senators

- Ted Cruz, Texas (2013–present)

U.S. representatives

- Tom Emmer, House majority whip (2023–present) from MN-08 (2015–present)
- Richard Hudson, NC-09 (2013–present) (post-primary)
- Mike Johnson, speaker of the House (2023–present) from LA-04 (2017–present)
- Steve Scalise, House majority leader (2023–present) from LA-01 (2008–present)

Statewide officials

- Greg Abbott, governor of Texas (2015–present)

Organizations

- NRCC MAGA Majority (post-primary)

==== Fundraising ====
Campaign finance reports as of February 11, 2026
Candidate	Raised	Spent	Cash on hand
Tano Tijerina (R)	$303,084	$234,553	$68,531
Source: Federal Election Commission

==== Results ====
Republican primary results
Party	Candidate	Votes	%
Republican	Tano Tijerina	12,514	74.3
Republican	Eileen Day	4,319	25.7
Total votes		16,833	100.0

=== Libertarian convention ===
==== Withdrawn ====
- John E. Foddrill Sr., candidate for San Antonio City Council in 2015 (did not appear on ballot, ran in Alaska)

=== Green convention ===
==== Candidates ====
- Marlón Durán

=== General election ===
==== Post-primary endorsements ====
Henry Cuellar (D)

Executive branch officials

- Bill Clinton, president of the United States (1993–2001)

Labor unions

- American Federation of Government Employees

==== Predictions ====
Source	Ranking	As of
Decision Desk HQ	Likely D	July 14, 2026
The Cook Political Report	Likely D	October 23, 2026
Inside Elections	Lean D	October 29, 2026
Sabato's Crystal Ball	Lean D	December 10, 2025
Silver Bulletin	Likely D	October 22, 2026

==== Fundraising ====
Campaign finance reports as of September 30, 2026
Candidate	Raised	Spent	Cash on hand
Henry Cuellar (D)	$2,992,065	$1,989,930	$1,050,094
Tano Tijerina (R)	$1,778,798	$1,564,568	$214,230
Source: Federal Election Commission

==== Polling ====
Poll source	Date(s) administered	Sample size	Margin of error	Henry Cuellar (D)	Tano Tijerina (R)	Other	Undecided
DCCC	October 7–13, 2026	536 (LV)	± 4.2%	54%	34%	12%	
Public Policy Research/Texas Southern University	August 18–22, 2026	600 (LV)	± 4.0%	45%	34%	6% (Note: Marlón Durán (G) with 6%)	15%
Pulse Science Decision (R) (Note: Poll sponsored by Tijerina's campaign)	June 21–23, 2026	400 (LV)	± 4.9%	38%	46%	–	16%
Pulse Science Decision (R)	June 21–23, 2026	400 (LV)	± 4.9%	33%	42%	9% (Note: "Someone else" with 9%)	16%

==== Results ====
2026 Texas's 28th congressional district election
Party	Candidate	Votes	%	±%
Democratic	Henry Cuellar (incumbent)			
Republican	Tano Tijerina			
Total votes				

== District 29 ==
2026 Texas's 29th congressional district election
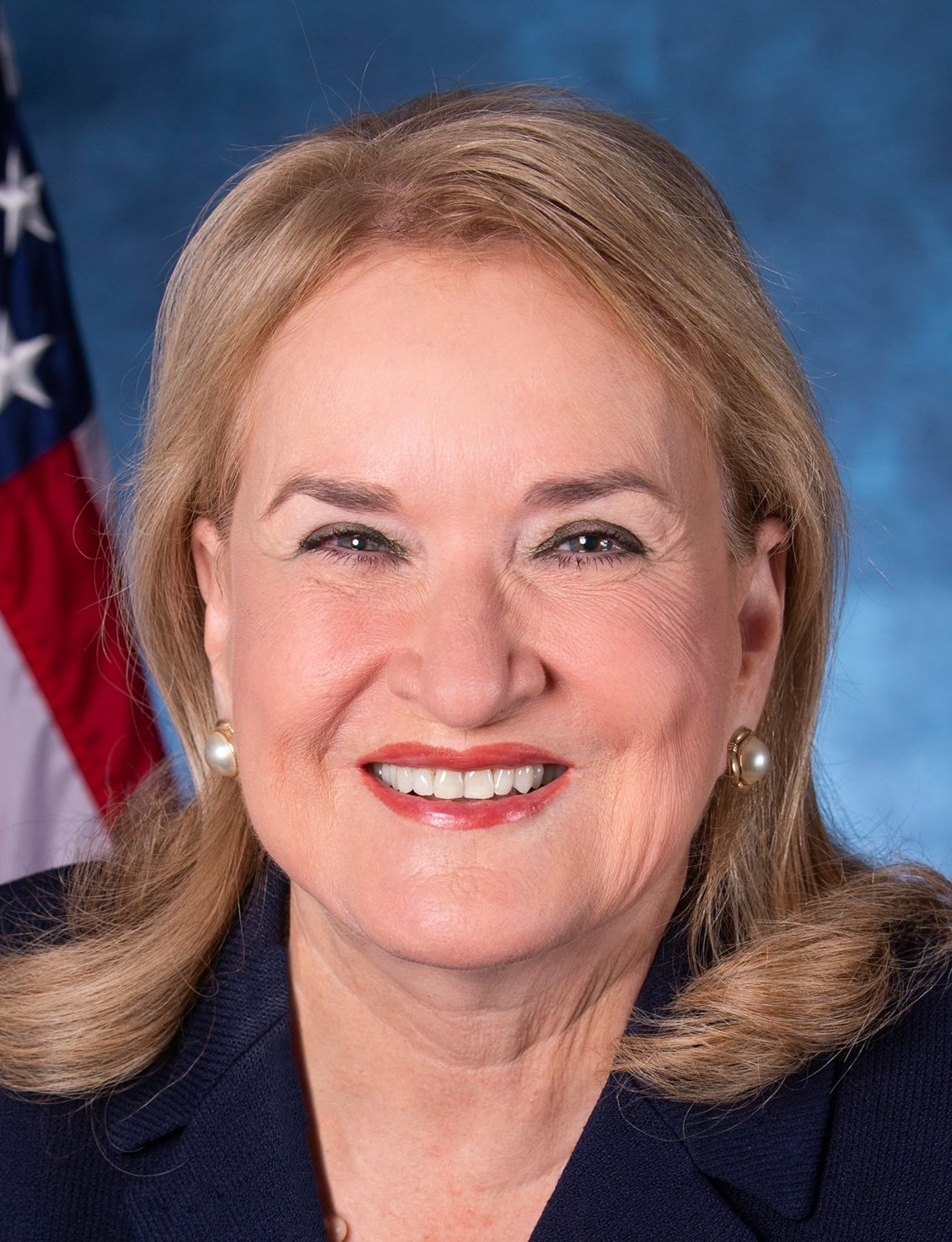

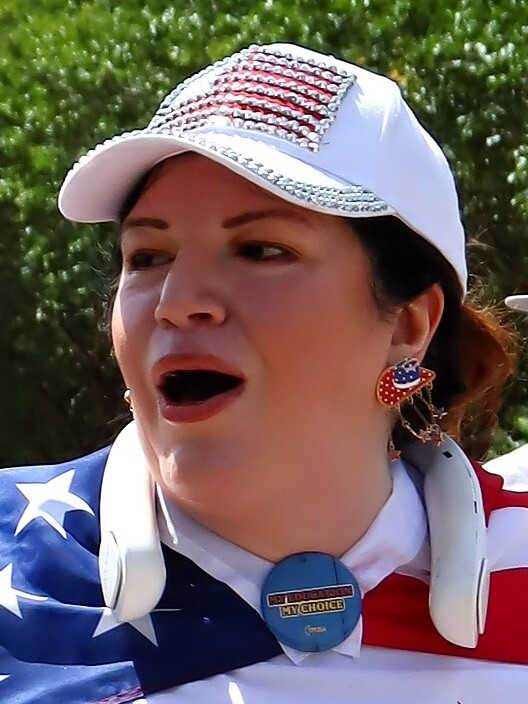
Nominee	Sylvia Garcia	Martha Fierro
Party	Democratic	Republican
Popular vote	133,989	33,619
Percentage	79.9%	20.1%
U.S. Representative before election
Sylvia Garcia
Democratic
Elected U.S. Representative
Sylvia Garcia
Democratic

Texas's 29th congressional district boundary from the 2026 elections Interactive map version

The new 29th district encompasses much of north Houston, taking in the heavily Latino Lindale Park and Northline areas along with historically Black Acres Homes and Independence Heights, as well as the Garden Oaks, Oak Forest and Fairbanks areas of northwest Houston, and the Aldine and Greenspoint areas of far north Houston including George Bush Intercontinental Airport. The incumbent is Democrat Sylvia Garcia, who was re-elected with 65.2% of the vote in 2024 in the majority Hispanic district, which was won by Kamala Harris (64.5%) and Colin Allred (67.6%) that same year.

=== Democratic primary ===
==== Nominee ====
- Sylvia Garcia, incumbent U.S. representative

==== Eliminated in primary ====
- Jarvis Johnson, former state representative from the 139th district (2016–2025), candidate for this district in 2010, candidate for Texas's 15th Senate district in the 2024 special and regular elections, and candidate for the 18th district in 2024
- Robert Slater, business owner and candidate for the 18th district in 2024 and 2025

==== Endorsements ====
Sylvia Garcia

Labor unions

- National Education Association

Organizations

- EMILYs List
- Houston LGBTQ+ Political Caucus
- J Street PAC
- League of Conservation Voters Action Fund
- Planned Parenthood Action Fund
- Reproductive Freedom for All

Newspapers

- Houston Chronicle
Declined to endorse

Labor unions

- Texas AFL-CIO

==== Fundraising ====
Campaign finance reports as of February 11, 2026
Candidate	Raised	Spent	Cash on hand
Sylvia Garcia (D)	$670,674	$815,473	$226,955
Jarvis Johnson (D)	$142,143 (Note: $100,000 of this total was self-funded by Johnson)	$47,713	$71,009
Robert Slater (D)	$33,892	$17,420	$12,808
Source: Federal Election Commission

==== Polling ====
Poll source	Date(s) administered	Sample size	Margin of error	Sylvia Garcia	Jarvis Johnson	Robert Slater	Undecided
University of Houston	February 3–10, 2026	500 (LV)	± 4.38%	46%	27%	2%	25%

==== Results ====
Democratic primary results
Party	Candidate	Votes	%
Democratic	Sylvia Garcia (incumbent)	30,803	58.2
Democratic	Jarvis Johnson	18,881	35.7
Democratic	Robert Slater	3,200	6.1
Total votes		52,884	100.0

=== Republican primary ===
==== Nominee ====
- Martha Fierro, director

==== Results ====
Republican primary results
Party	Candidate	Votes	%
Republican	Martha Fierro	9,633	100.0
Total votes		9,633	100.0

=== General election ===
==== Predictions ====
Source	Ranking	As of
Decision Desk HQ	Safe D	July 14, 2026
The Cook Political Report	Solid D	February 6, 2025
Inside Elections	Solid D	March 7, 2025
Sabato's Crystal Ball	Safe D	September 18, 2025
Silver Bulletin	Solid D	October 22, 2026

==== Post-primary endorsements ====
Sylvia Garcia (D)

Labor unions

- American Federation of Government Employees
- United Auto Workers

Organizations

- Giffords

==== Fundraising ====
Campaign finance reports as of April 26, 2026
Candidate	Raised	Spent	Cash on hand
Sylvia Garcia (D)	$903,166	$1,099,258	$175,662
Martha Fierro (R)	$0	$0	$0
Source: Federal Election Commission

==== Results ====
2026 Texas's 29th congressional district election
Party	Candidate	Votes	%	±%
Democratic	Sylvia Garcia (incumbent)			
Republican	Martha Fierro			
Total votes				

== District 30 ==
2026 Texas's 30th congressional district election
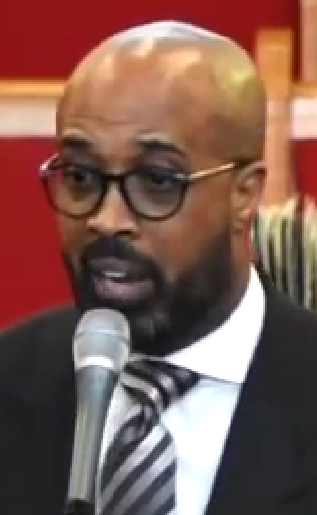

Nominee	Frederick Haynes III	Everett Jackson
Party	Democratic	Republican
Popular vote	186,871	39,247
Percentage	82.6%	17.4%
U.S. Representative before election
None
(New seat)
Elected U.S. Representative
Frederick Haynes III
Democratic

Texas's 30th congressional district boundary from the 2026 elections Interactive map version

The new 30th district is anchored in the southern portions of Dallas and encompasses South Dallas and Fair Park, stretching southward to such diverse south Dallas County suburbs as Lancaster, Duncanville, DeSoto, Wilmer, Cedar Hill and southern Grand Prairie. Prior to redistricting, the incumbent was Democrat Jasmine Crockett; however, Crockett was drawn out of the 30th district and into the 33rd and ultimately decided to run for the U.S. Senate. Kamala Harris won 72.7% of the vote in the district in 2024, as did Dallas native Colin Allred who won 75.1% in his losing Senate bid against Ted Cruz.

=== Democratic primary ===
==== Nominee ====
- Frederick Haynes III, pastor and former president and CEO of Rainbow/PUSH

==== Eliminated in primary ====
- Barbara Mallory Caraway, former state representative from the 110th district (2007–2013) and perennial candidate
- Rodney LaBruce, pastor

==== Declined ====
- Jasmine Crockett, incumbent U.S. representative from the 30th district (ran for U.S. Senate, endorsed Haynes III)
- Marc Veasey, incumbent U.S. representative from the 25th district (ran for Tarrant County judge)

==== Endorsements ====
Frederick Haynes III

U.S. representatives

- Greg Casar, TX-35 (2023–present)
- Jasmine Crockett, TX-30 (2023–present)
- Maxwell Frost, FL-10 (2023–present)
- Pramila Jayapal, WA-07 (2017–present)

State legislators

- Chris Turner, state representative from the 101st district (2009–2011, 2013–present)

Local officials

- Alisa Simmons, Tarrant County commissioner (2023–present)

Individuals

- Zeeshan Hafeez, technology executive

Labor unions

- Texas AFL-CIO

Organizations

- American Federation of Teachers in Texas
- American Priorities
- A New Policy PAC
- Congressional Progressive Caucus PAC
- Justice Democrats
- Our Revolution
- PAL PAC
- Track AIPAC

Newspapers

- Dallas Morning News
- Fort Worth Star-Telegram

==== Fundraising ====
Campaign finance reports as of February 11, 2026
Candidate	Raised	Spent	Cash on hand
Barbara Mallory Caraway (D)	$16,536 (Note: $2,010 of this total was self-funded by Mallory Caraway)	$11,990	$4,630
Frederick Haynes III (D)	$158,563	$23,015	$135,547
Rodney LaBruce (D)	$5,115 (Note: $3,125 of this total was self-funded by LaBruce)	$4,478	$3,040
Source: Federal Election Commission

==== Results ====
Results by county Haynes: 50–60%; 70–80%

Results by precinct Haynes: 40–50%; 50–60%; 60–70%; 70–80%; 80–90%; 90–100%; Caraway: 40–50%; 50–60%; 60–70%; 90–100%; Tie: 40-50%; 50%

Democratic primary results
Party	Candidate	Votes	%
Democratic	Frederick Haynes III	76,701	72.6
Democratic	Barbara Mallory Caraway	24,370	23.1
Democratic	Rodney LaBruce	4,546	4.3
Total votes		105,617	100.0

=== Republican primary ===
==== Nominee ====
- Everett Jackson, business owner

==== Eliminated in runoff ====
- Sholdon Daniels, attorney

==== Eliminated in primary ====
- Gregorio Heise, veteran
- Nils Walker, IT project coordinator

==== Endorsements ====
Sholdon Daniels

Newspapers

- Fort Worth Star-Telegram
Declined to endorse

Newspapers

- Dallas Morning News

==== Fundraising ====
Campaign finance reports as of February 11, 2026
Candidate	Raised	Spent	Cash on hand
Sholdon Daniels (R)	$353,563 (Note: $700 of this total was self-funded by Daniels)	$369,866	$0
Gregor Heise (R)	$158,473 (Note: $40,000 of this total was self-funded by Heise)	$127,309	$31,164
Everett Jackson (R)	$14,885 (Note: $200 of this total was self-funded by Jackson)	$9,018	$5,866
Source: Federal Election Commission

==== Results ====
Republican primary results
Party	Candidate	Votes	%
Republican	Everett Jackson	5,414	38.0
Republican	Sholdon Daniels	3,463	24.3
Republican	Gregor Heise	2,767	19.4
Republican	Nils Walker	2,594	18.2
Total votes		14,238	100.0

==== Runoff results ====
Republican primary runoff results
Party	Candidate	Votes	%
Republican	Everett Jackson	4,960	57.5
Republican	Sholdon Daniels	3,664	42.5
Total votes		8,624	100.0

=== Independents ===
==== Filed paperwork ====
- Oxford Nordberg, entrepreneur

=== General election ===
==== Predictions ====
Source	Ranking	As of
Decision Desk HQ	Safe D	July 14, 2026
The Cook Political Report	Solid D	February 6, 2025
Inside Elections	Solid D	March 7, 2025
Sabato's Crystal Ball	Safe D	September 18, 2025
Silver Bulletin	Solid D	October 22, 2026

==== Post-primary endorsements ====
Frederick Haynes (D)

Labor unions

- American Federation of Government Employees

Organizations

- Giffords
- J Street
- MoveOn

==== Fundraising ====
Campaign finance reports as of April 26, 2026
Candidate	Raised	Spent	Cash on hand
Frederick Haynes III (D)	$347,441	$222,592	$124,849
Everett Jackson	$16,948	$14,542	$2,406
Source: Federal Election Commission

==== Results ====
2026 Texas's 30th congressional district election
Party	Candidate	Votes	%	±%
Democratic	Frederick Haynes III			
Republican	Everett Jackson			
Total votes				

== District 31 ==
2026 Texas's 31st congressional district election
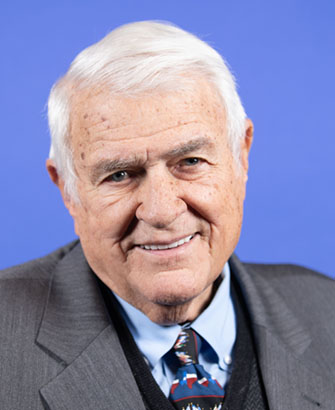

Nominee	John Carter	Justin Early
Party	Republican	Democratic
Popular vote	164,012	136,734
Percentage	53.8%	44.8%
U.S. Representative before election
John Carter
Republican
Elected U.S. Representative
John Carter
Republican

Texas's 31st congressional district boundary from the 2026 elections Interactive map version

The new 31st district is anchored in the northern exurbs of Austin (including Georgetown and Burnet) and stretches northward to Killeen and most of Temple along with Fort Hood, going as far north as Hamilton. The incumbent is Republican John Carter, who was re-elected with 64.5% of the vote in 2024. That same year, Donald Trump won 60.1% and Ted Cruz 57.6% of the vote, respectively.

=== Republican primary ===
==== Nominee ====
- John Carter, incumbent U.S. representative

==== Eliminated in primary ====
- William Abel, U.S. Army veteran
- David Berry, physician
- Steve Dowell, U.S. Army veteran
- Edward Ewald, retiree
- Abhiram Garapati, real estate investor
- Valentina Gomez, financial strategist and candidate for Missouri Secretary of State in 2024 (previously ran in the 2nd district)
- Raymond Hamden, real estate broker
- Elvis Lossa, policy coordinator
- Vince Offer, pitchman and comedian

==== Endorsements ====
John Carter

Executive branch officials

- Donald Trump, 45th and 47th president of the United States (2017–2021, 2025–present)

Statewide officials

- Greg Abbott, governor of Texas (2015–present)

Organizations

- AIPAC
Steve Dowell

Newspapers

- Austin American-Statesman

==== Fundraising ====
Campaign finance reports as of February 11, 2026
Candidate	Raised	Spent	Cash on hand
William Abel (R)	$7,670	$7,550	$0
David Berry (R)	$36,800 (Note: $25,100 of this total was self-funded by Berry)	$36,800	$0
John Carter (R)	$1,111,902	$827,394	$325,946
Steve Dowell (R)	$46,566	$42,936	$3,629
Abhiram Garapati (R)	$55,000 (Note: $55,000 of this total was self-funded by Garapati)	$16,000	$39,000
Valentina Gomez (R)	$112,522	$83,707	$0
Raymond Hamden (R)	$144,331 (Note: $110,000 of this total was self-funded by Hamden)	$39,444	$146
Elvis Lossa (R)	$11,382 (Note: $5,331 of this total was self-funded by Lossa)	$7,526	$3,856
Vince Offer (R)	$173,869 (Note: $156,100 of this total was self-funded by Offer)	$172,609	$1,259
Source: Federal Election Commission

==== Results ====
2026 GOP primary results by county: Carter: 40–50%; 50–60%; 60–70%

Republican primary results
Party	Candidate	Votes	%
Republican	John Carter (incumbent)	45,834	59.7
Republican	Valentina Gomez	8,401	10.9
Republican	Abhiram Garapati	5,036	6.6
Republican	Steve Dowell	4,729	6.2
Republican	Raymond Hamden	4,530	5.9
Republican	Vince Offer	3,187	4.2
Republican	William Abel	1,931	2.5
Republican	David Berry	1,739	2.3
Republican	Edward Ewald	790	1.0
Republican	Elvis Lossa	571	0.7
Total votes		76,748	100.0

=== Democratic primary ===
==== Nominee ====
- Justin Early, cybersecurity architect

==== Eliminated in primary ====
- Stuart Whitlow, attorney and nominee for this district in 2024

==== Withdrawn ====
- Caitlin Rourk, marketing employee (running in the 10th district)

==== Endorsements ====
Justin Early

Labor unions

- Texas AFL-CIO (co-endorsement with Whitlow)
Stuart Whitlow

Labor unions

- Texas AFL-CIO (co-endorsement with Early)

Newspapers

- Austin American-Statesman
- The Austin Chronicle

==== Fundraising ====
Campaign finance reports as of February 11, 2026
Candidate	Raised	Spent	Cash on hand
Justin Early (D)	$79,241 (Note: $32,800 of this total was self-funded by Early)	$52,426	$26,814
Stuart Whitlow (D)	$168,317 (Note: $155,855 of this total was self-funded by Whitlow)	$169,059	$2,907
Source: Federal Election Commission

==== Results ====
Democratic primary results
Party	Candidate	Votes	%
Democratic	Justin Early	31,881	57.6
Democratic	Stuart Whitlow	23,467	42.4
Total votes		55,348	100.0

=== Green convention ===
==== Candidates ====
- Greg Stoker, podcaster, anti-war activist and former Army Ranger

=== General election ===
==== Predictions ====
Source	Ranking	As of
Decision Desk HQ	Likely R	October 30, 2026
The Cook Political Report	Solid R	February 6, 2025
Inside Elections	Solid R	March 7, 2025
Sabato's Crystal Ball	Safe R	September 18, 2025
Silver Bulletin	Solid R	October 22, 2026

==== Post-primary endorsements ====
Justin Early (D)

Organizations

- Track AIPAC

==== Fundraising ====
Campaign finance reports as of June 30, 2026
Candidate	Raised	Spent	Cash on hand
John Carter (R)	$1,419,042	$1,289,654	$170,827
Justin Early (D)	$123,522	$106,122	$17,400
Source: Federal Election Commission

==== Results ====
2026 Texas's 31st congressional district election
Party	Candidate	Votes	%	±%
Republican	John Carter (incumbent)			
Democratic	Justin Early			
Total votes				

== District 32 ==
2026 Texas's 32nd congressional district election

Nominee	Jace Yarbrough	Dan Barrios
Party	Republican	Democratic
Popular vote	142,877	134,792
Percentage	51.5%	48.5%
U.S. Representative before election
None
(New seat)
Elected U.S. Representative
Jace Yarbrough
Republican

Texas's 32nd congressional district boundary from the 2026 elections Interactive map version

The new 32nd district covers several suburban areas directly north and northeast of Dallas, including most of the Dallas County portion of Carrollton and Addison along with all of Richardson (including the Collin County portion) and the northern halves of Garland and Rowlett, as well as the far north side of Dallas itself. The district then stretches eastward and crosses Lake Ray Hubbard to take in suburban Rockwall County and the Lake Tawakoni area, traveling all the way east to such northern Tyler exurbs as Mineola and Gilmer.

Prior to redistricting, the incumbent was Democrat Julie Johnson; however, Johnson was drawn out of the 32nd district and into the 24th, ultimately deciding to seek reelection in the 33rd district (see below) and leaving this district as an open seat. In 2024, the new district gave 57.7% of the vote to Donald Trump and 55.2% to Ted Cruz, with Democrats only considered competitive in the Dallas County and Richardson portion of the otherwise heavily Republican district.

=== Democratic primary ===
==== Nominee ====
- Dan Barrios, Richardson city councilor

==== Eliminated in primary ====
- Anthony Bridges, EMT

==== Declined ====
- Julie Johnson, incumbent U.S. representative from the 24th district (ran in 33rd district)
- Marc Veasey, incumbent U.S. representative from the 25th district (ran for Tarrant County judge)

==== Endorsements ====
Dan Barrios

U.S. representatives

- Colin Allred, former TX-32 (2019–2025)
- Julie Johnson, TX-32 (2025–present)

Newspapers

- Dallas Morning News

==== Fundraising ====
Campaign finance reports as of February 11, 2026
Candidate	Raised	Spent	Cash on hand
Dan Barrios (D)	$44,925	$26,527	$18,397
Source: Federal Election Commission

==== Results ====
Democratic primary results
Party	Candidate	Votes	%
Democratic	Dan Barrios	34,759	60.4
Democratic	Anthony Bridges	22,762	39.6
Total votes		57,521	100.0

=== Republican primary ===
==== Nominee ====
- Jace Yarbrough, attorney and candidate for Texas's 30th Senate district in 2024

==== Advanced to runoff ====
- Ryan Binkley, pastor and candidate for president in 2024 (withdrew before runoff)

==== Eliminated in primary ====
- Paul Bondar, insurance agency owner and candidate for Oklahoma's 4th congressional district in 2024
- Aimee Carrasco, U.S. Marine Corps veteran
- Darrell Day, former Arlington city councilor, candidate for this district in 2022, and nominee in 2024
- Gordon Heslop, retired educator
- Monty Montanez, U.S. Air Force veteran
- James Ussery, telecom technician (previously ran in the 5th district)
- Abteen Vaziri, lawyer

==== Withdrawn ====
- Tobey Pearson

==== Declined ====
- Genevieve Collins, business executive and nominee for this district in 2020
- Darrell Issa, incumbent U.S. representative from California's 48th congressional district
- Eric Johnson, mayor of Dallas (2019–present)
- Katrina Pierson, state representative from the 33rd district (2025–present) and candidate for this district in 2014 (running for re-election)

==== Endorsements ====
Ryan Binkley

U.S. representatives

- Jake Ellzey, TX-06 (2021–present)

Individuals

- Lance Wallnau, televangelist
Gordon Heslop

Newspapers

- Dallas Morning News
Jace Yarbrough

Executive branch officials

- Donald Trump, president of the United States (2017–2021, 2025–present)

U.S. representatives

- Tom Emmer, House majority whip (2023–present) from MN-08 (2015–present)
- Brandon Gill, TX-26 (2025–present)
- Lance Gooden, TX-05 (2019–present)
- Mike Johnson, speaker of the House (2023–present) from LA-04 (2017–present)
- Ralph Norman, SC-05 (2017–present)
- Steve Scalise, House majority leader (2023–present) from LA-01 (2008–present)
- Keith Self, TX-03 (2023–present)
- Greg Steube, FL-17 (2019–present)

Statewide officials

- Greg Abbott, governor of Texas (2015–present)

Organizations

- Freedom Caucus Fund
- Hunt County Young Republicans
- Rockwall County Young Republicans
- Turning Point Action

==== Fundraising ====
Campaign finance reports as of February 11, 2026
Candidate	Raised	Spent	Cash on hand
Ryan Binkley (R)	$1,933,131 (Note: $1,504,000 of this total was self-funded by Binkley)	$1,645,449	$287,682
Paul Bondar (R)	$1,908,969 (Note: $1,902,663 of this total was self-funded by Bondar)	$1,898,014	$10,955
Aimee Carrasco (R)	$34,575 (Note: $33,000 of this total was self-funded by Carrasco)	$33,951	$623
Darrell Day (R)	$102,105 (Note: $63,000 of this total was self-funded by Day)	$57,618	$133,820
Monty Montanez (R)	$39,224 (Note: $22,286 of this total was self-funded by Montanez)	$39,966	$0
Abteen Vaziri (R)	$63,461 (Note: $3,125 of this total was self-funded by Vaziri)	$64,785	$0
Jace Yarbrough (R)	$424,554 (Note: $207,000 of this total was self-funded by Yarbrough)	$226,219	$198,334
Source: Federal Election Commission

==== Polling ====
Hypothetical polling

Poll source	Date(s) administered	Sample size	Margin of error	Ryan Binkley	Darrell Day	Katrina Pierson	Will Douglas	Undecided
Stratus Intelligence (R)	September 24–26, 2025	411 (LV)	–	4%	9%	15%	5%	68%

==== Results ====
Republican primary results
Party	Candidate	Votes	%
Republican	Jace Yarbrough	33,874	49.0
Republican	Ryan Binkley	15,028	21.7
Republican	Paul Bondar	9,586	13.9
Republican	Darrell Day	4,030	5.8
Republican	James Ussery	1,959	2.8
Republican	Aimee Carrasco	1,834	2.7
Republican	Gordon Heslop	1,470	2.1
Republican	Monty Montanez	867	1.3
Republican	Abteen Vaziri	541	0.8
Total votes		69,189	100.0

=== Independents ===
==== Filed paperwork ====
- Charles Harper

=== General election ===
==== Predictions ====
Source	Ranking	As of
Decision Desk HQ	Likely R (flip)	July 14, 2026
The Cook Political Report	Solid R (flip)	August 23, 2025
Inside Elections	Solid R (flip)	August 28, 2025
Sabato's Crystal Ball	Safe R (flip)	August 29, 2025
Silver Bulletin	Likely R (flip)	October 22, 2026

==== Post-primary endorsements ====
Jace Yarbrough (R)

Organizations

- MAHA Action
- MAHA PAC

==== Fundraising ====
Campaign finance reports as of September 30, 2026
Candidate	Raised	Spent	Cash on hand
Dan Barrios (D)	$150,470	$122,598	$27,872
Jace Yarbrough (R)	$1,211,319	$918,755	$292,565
Source: Federal Election Commission

==== Results ====
2026 Texas's 32nd congressional district election results
Party	Candidate	Votes	%
Democratic	Dan Barrios		
Republican	Jace Yarbrough		
Total votes			100

== District 33 ==
2026 Texas's 33rd congressional district election
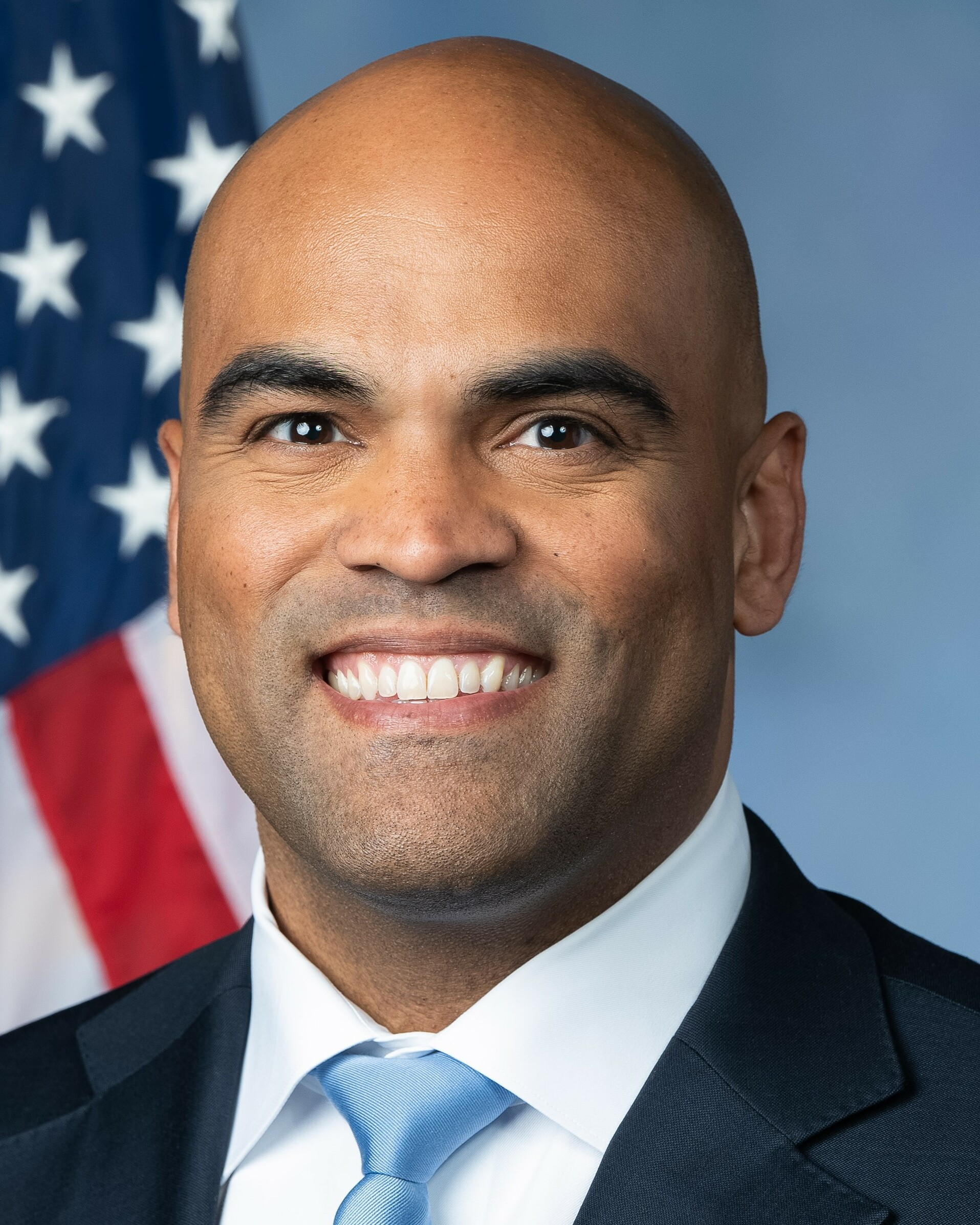

Nominee	Colin Allred	Patrick Gillespie
Party	Democratic	Republican
Popular vote	150,891	41,157
Percentage	78.6%	21.4%
U.S. Representative before election
Jasmine Crockett
Democratic
Elected U.S. Representative
Colin Allred
Democratic

Texas's 33rd congressional district boundary from the 2026 elections Interactive map version

The new 33rd district, previously encompassing mostly Hispanic parts of the Dallas–Fort Worth metroplex including Downtown Fort Worth, western Dallas, and parts of Grand Prairie, Irving, Carrollton, and Farmers Branch, has since been redrawn to be exclusively within Dallas County. Prior to redistricting, the incumbent was Fort Worth-based Democrat Marc Veasey. However, Veasey was drawn out of the 33rd district and into the 25th, and ultimately chose to pursue a short-lived bid for Tarrant County judge before abandoning that bid. The new incumbent is Democrat Jasmine Crockett, who was elected with 84.9% of the vote in 2024, in her previous District 30; however, Crockett chose to pursue a run for the United States Senate seat currently held by John Cornyn.

Former congressman and 2024 U.S. Senate nominee Colin Allred (who lost in the general election that year to Ted Cruz) and current 32nd District incumbent Julie Johnson ran for the Democratic nomination to represent this district, which is centered in Downtown and Uptown Dallas and also extends in four separate directions - northwest to Love Field and a northern section of Irving centered on the Valley Ranch area, northeast to the Swiss Avenue and Buckner Boulevard (east of White Rock Lake) corridors in east Dallas, southeast to southeast Dallas (including Pleasant Grove) and Balch Springs, and southwest to West Dallas as well as Cockrell Hill and central Grand Prairie. The new district gave 65.2% of the vote to Kamala Harris and 68.7% to Allred in 2024, and is over 50 percent Hispanic. Allred defeated Johnson in the runoff with 55% of the vote.

=== Democratic primary ===
==== Nominee ====
- Colin Allred, former U.S. representative from Texas's 32nd congressional district (2019–2025) and nominee for U.S. Senate in 2024 (previously ran for U.S. Senate)

==== Eliminated in runoff ====
- Julie Johnson, incumbent U.S. representative from the 32nd district

==== Eliminated in primary ====
- Zeeshan Hafeez, technology executive
- Carlos Quintanilla, perennial candidate

==== Declined ====
- Jasmine Crockett, incumbent U.S. representative (ran for U.S. Senate)
- Domingo García, former president of the League of United Latin American Citizens (2018–2024) and candidate for this district in 2012
- Marc Veasey, incumbent U.S. representative from the 25th district (ran for Tarrant County judge)

==== Endorsements ====
Colin Allred

U.S. representatives

- Jasmine Crockett, TX-30 (2023–present)

State legislators

- Rhetta Bowers, state representative from the 113th district (2019–present)
- Aicha Davis, state representative from the 109th district (2025–present)

Local officials

- John Wiley Price, Dallas County commissioner (1985–present)

Newspapers

- Dallas Morning News

Organizations

- J Street
Zeeshan Hafeez

U.S. representatives

- Marie Newman, former IL-03 (2021–2023)

State legislators

- Ana-Maria Ramos, state representative from the 102nd district (2019–present)
- Terry Meza, state representative from the 105th district (2019–present)

Individuals

- Frederick Haynes III, pastor and former president and CEO of Rainbow/PUSH
- Linda Sarsour, political activist

Organizations

- CAIR Action Texas
- Dallas County Young Democrats
- Progressive Democrats of America
- Progressive Victory
- Sunrise Movement
- Track AIPAC
- U.S. Council of Muslim Organizations
- Vote Common Good
Julie Johnson

U.S. representatives

- Pete Aguilar, CA-33 (2015–present)
- Yassamin Ansari, AZ-03 (2025–present)
- Becca Balint, VT-AL (2023–present)
- Julia Brownley, CA-26 (2013–present)
- Salud Carbajal, CA-24 (2017–present)
- Gil Cisneros, CA-31 (2025–present)
- Katherine Clark, House minority whip (2023–present) from MA-05 (2013–present)
- Rosa DeLauro, CT-03 (1991–present)
- Suzan DelBene, WA-01 (2012–present)
- Maxine Dexter, OR-03 (2025–present)
- Sarah Elfreth, MD-03 (2025–present)
- Lois Frankel, FL-22 (2013–present)
- Laura Friedman, CA-30 (2025–present)
- Sylvia Garcia, TX-29 (2019–present)
- Laura Gillen, NY-04 (2025–present)
- Vicente Gonzalez, TX-34 (2017–present)
- Maggie Goodlander, NH-02 (2025–present)
- Pablo Hernández Rivera, PR-AL (2025–present)
- Val Hoyle, OR-04 (2023–present)
- Hakeem Jeffries, House minority leader (2023–present) from NY-08 (2013–present)
- Tim Kennedy, NY-26 (2024–present)
- Sam Liccardo, CA-16 (2025–present)
- Ted Lieu, CA-36 (2015–present)
- Sarah McBride, DE-AL (2025–present)
- Kristen McDonald Rivet, MI-08 (2025–present)
- Jim McGovern, MA-02 (1997–present)
- Joe Morelle, NY-25 (2018–present)
- Kelly Morrison, MN-03 (2025–present)
- Alexandria Ocasio-Cortez, NY-14 (2019–present)
- Johnny Olszewski, MD-02 (2025–present)
- Jimmy Panetta, CA-19 (2017–present)
- Chellie Pingree, ME-01 (2009–present)
- Mark Pocan, WI-02 (2013–present)
- Emily Randall, WA-06 (2025–present)
- Luz Rivas, CA-29 (2025–present)
- Andrea Salinas, OR-06 (2023–present)
- Brad Schneider, IL-10 (2017–present)
- Hillary Scholten, MI-03 (2023–present)
- Eric Sorensen, IL-17 (2023–present)
- Greg Stanton, AZ-04 (2019–present)
- Mark Takano, CA-39 (2013–present)
- Jill Tokuda, HI-02 (2023–present)
- Ritchie Torres, NY-15 (2021–present)
- Lori Trahan, MA-03 (2019–present)
- Derek Tran, CA-45 (2025–present)
- Eugene Vindman, VA-07 (2025–present)
- George Whitesides, CA-27 (2025–present)

State legislators

- Nathan M. Johnson, SD-16 (2019–present) and 2026 nominee for Texas Attorney General
- James Talarico, HD-50 and 2026 nominee for U.S. Senate
- Gene Wu, HD-137 (2017–present) and minority leader of the Texas House of Representatives (2025–present)

Organizations

- AIPAC
- Christopher Street Project
- Elect Democratic Women
- EMILYs List
- Equality PAC
- League of Conservation Voters Action Fund
- LGBTQ Victory Fund
- New Democrat Coalition Action Fund
- Planned Parenthood Action Fund
- U.S. Chamber of Commerce
Declined to endorse

Labor unions

- Texas AFL-CIO

==== Fundraising ====
Campaign finance reports as of February 11, 2026
Candidate	Raised	Spent	Cash on hand
Colin Allred (D)	$5,412,502	$4,554,472	$858,029
Zeeshan Hafeez (D)	$409,934	$324,472	$85,462
Julie Johnson (D)	$1,554,059	$1,235,596	$549,366
Source: Federal Election Commission

==== Polling ====
Poll source	Date(s) administered	Sample size	Margin of error	Colin Allred	Julie Johnson	Undecided
GBAO (D) (Note: Poll sponsored by Allred's campaign)	December 14–17, 2025	500 (LV)	± 4.4%	58%	30%	12%

==== Results ====
Democratic primary results
Party	Candidate	Votes	%
Democratic	Colin Allred	31,482	44.0
Democratic	Julie Johnson (incumbent)	23,770	33.2
Democratic	Carlos Quintanilla	10,276	14.3
Democratic	Zeeshan Hafeez	6,083	8.5
Total votes		71,611	100.0

==== Runoff results ====
Results by precinct Allred: 50–60%; 60–70%; 70–80%; 80–90%; 90–100%; Johnson: 50–60%; 60–70%; 70–80%; 80–90%; 90–100%; Tie: 50%

Democratic primary runoff results
Party	Candidate	Votes	%
Democratic	Colin Allred	11,354	54.0
Democratic	Julie Johnson (incumbent)	9,677	46.0
Total votes		21,031	100.0

=== Republican primary ===
==== Nominee ====
- Patrick Gillespie, customs broker

==== Eliminated runoff ====
- John Sims, retired police officer

==== Eliminated in primary ====
- Monte Mitchell, physician
- Kurt Schwab, marketing consultant

Not on ballot

- Payton Jackson, credit specialist

==== Endorsements ====
Kurt Schwab

Newspapers

- Dallas Morning News

==== Fundraising ====
Campaign finance reports as of December 31, 2025
Candidate	Raised	Spent	Cash on hand
Kurt Schwab (R)	$10,130 (Note: $100 of this total was self-funded by Schwab)	$9,539	$590
Source: Federal Election Commission

==== Results ====
Republican primary results
Party	Candidate	Votes	%
Republican	Patrick Gillespie	4,654	35.5
Republican	John Sims	2,922	22.3
Republican	Monte Mitchell	2,850	21.7
Republican	Kurt Schwab	2,692	20.5
Total votes		13,118	100.0

==== Runoff results ====
Republican primary runoff results
Party	Candidate	Votes	%
Republican	Patrick Gillespie	5,020	57.1
Republican	John Sims	3,771	42.9
Total votes		8,791	100.0

=== General election ===
==== Predictions ====
Source	Ranking	As of
Decision Desk HQ	Safe D	July 14, 2026
The Cook Political Report	Solid D	February 6, 2025
Inside Elections	Solid D	March 7, 2025
Sabato's Crystal Ball	Safe D	September 18, 2025
Silver Bulletin	Solid D	October 22, 2026

==== Post-primary endorsements ====
Colin Allred (D)

Organizations

- Giffords

==== Fundraising ====
Campaign finance reports as of April 26, 2026
Candidate	Raised	Spent	Cash on hand
Colin Allred	$6,842,416	$6,175,185	$667,231
Patrick Gillespie	$0	$0	$0
Source: Federal Election Commission

==== Results ====
2026 Texas's 33rd congressional district election results
Party	Candidate	Votes	%
Democratic	Colin Allred		
Republican	Patrick Gillespie		
Total votes			100

== District 34 ==
2026 Texas's 34th congressional district election
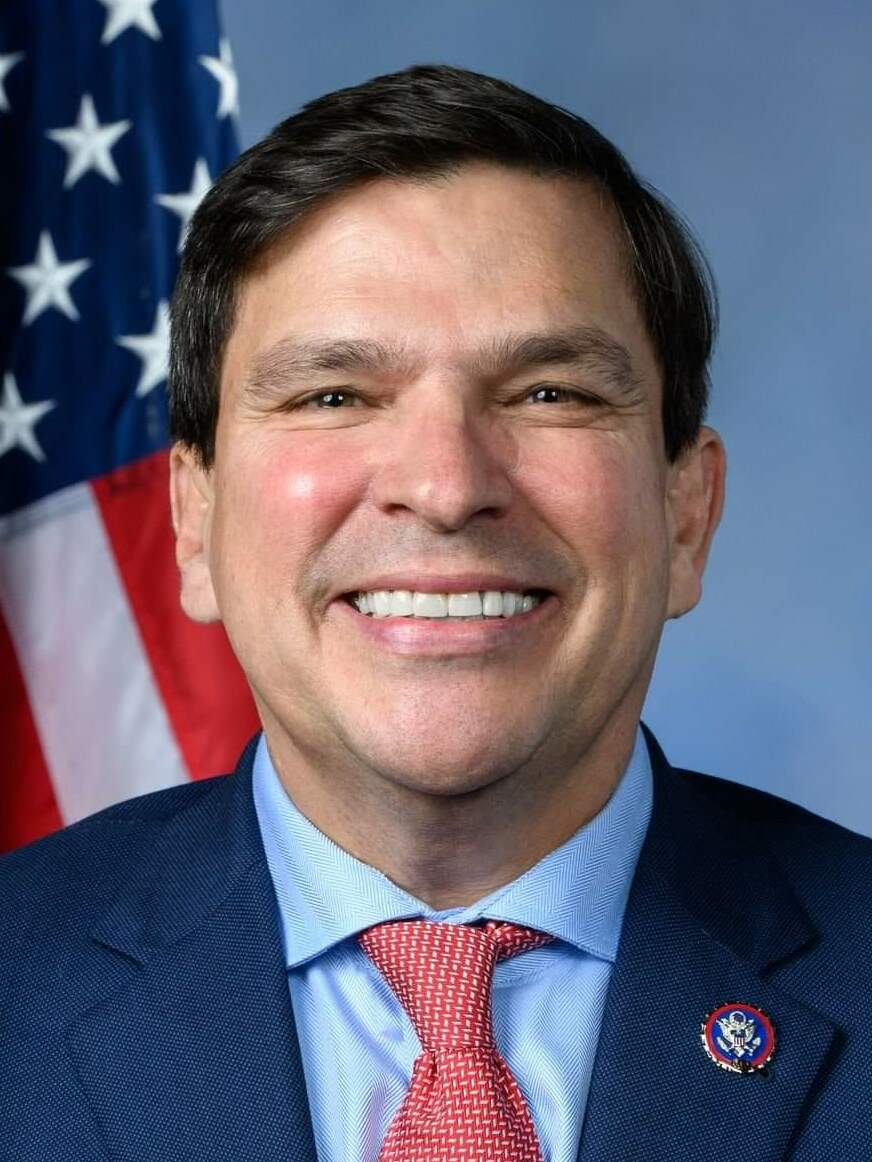

Nominee	Vicente Gonzalez	Eric Flores
Party	Democratic	Republican
Popular vote	112,667	80,572
Percentage	55.6%	39.8%
U.S. Representative before election
Vicente Gonzalez
Democratic
Elected U.S. Representative
Vicente Gonzalez
Democratic

Texas's 34th congressional district boundary from the 2026 elections Interactive map version

The new 34th district stretches from Brownsville in the Rio Grande Valley, northward along the Gulf Coast to most of Corpus Christi, covering all of Cameron, Willacy, Kenedy, Kleberg and most of Nueces counties, essentially a recreation of the old 27th district from its establishment in 1982 until the 2010 election. The incumbent is Democrat Vicente Gonzalez, who was re-elected with 51.3% of the vote in 2024.

Donald Trump won the district with 54.6% of the vote in 2024, having previously lost the district to Hillary Clinton and Joe Biden in 2016 and 2020, respectively, with Barack Obama winning the district twice in 2008 and 2012. Also, Ted Cruz won the district with a 49.7% plurality in 2024, even though the district gave 55% of the vote to Beto O'Rourke over Cruz in 2018.

The election was one of the most expensive congressional races in the 2026 elections, with over $30.8 million in spending.

=== Democratic primary ===
==== Nominee ====
- Vicente Gonzalez, incumbent U.S. representative

==== Eliminated in primary ====
- Etienne Rosas, public policy analyst

==== Endorsements ====
Vicente Gonzalez

Labor unions

- National Education Association

Organizations

- AIPAC
- Democratic Majority for Israel
- Latino Victory
Etienne Rosas

Organizations

- Democratic Socialists of America Rio Grande Valley
- Track AIPAC
Declined to endorse

Labor unions

- Texas AFL-CIO

==== Fundraising ====
Campaign finance reports as of February 11, 2026
Candidate	Raised	Spent	Cash on hand
Vicente Gonzalez (D)	$1,916,885	$930,093	$1,268,851
Etienne Rosas (D)	$33,160	$22,411	$7,931
Source: Federal Election Commission

==== Results ====
Democratic primary results
Party	Candidate	Votes	%
Democratic	Vicente Gonzalez (incumbent)	35,342	62.7
Democratic	Etienne Rosas	20,993	37.3
Total votes		56,335	100.0

=== Republican primary ===
==== Nominee ====
- Eric Flores, former federal prosecutor and son of former state representative Ismael Flores

==== Eliminated in primary ====
- Keith Allen, retail manager
- Luis Buentello, lobbyist
- Mayra Flores, former U.S. representative (2022–2023) (previously ran in the 28th district)
- Gregory Kunkle, musician and candidate for this district in 2022 and 2024

==== Withdrawn ====
- Fred Hinojosa, activist and brother of state senator Adam Hinojosa (endorsed Eric Flores, remained on ballot)
- Scott Mandel, businessman and candidate for the 27th district in 2024 (endorsed Eric Flores, remained on ballot)
- Jay Nagy, engineer (endorsed Eric Flores, remained on ballot)

==== Endorsements ====
Eric Flores

Executive branch officials

- Donald Trump, president of the United States (2017–2021, 2025–present)

U.S. representatives

- Monica De La Cruz, TX-15 (2023–present)
- Tom Emmer, House majority whip (2023–present) from MN-08 (2015–present)
- Richard Hudson, NC-09 (2013–present) (post-primary)
- Mike Johnson, speaker of the House (2023–present) from LA-04 (2017–present)
- Steve Scalise, House majority leader (2023–present) from LA-01 (2008–present)

Statewide officials

- Greg Abbott, governor of Texas (2015–present)

Organizations

- NRCC MAGA Majority (post-primary)
Mayra Flores

U.S. representatives

- Kat Cammack, FL-03 (2021–present)
- Juan Ciscomani, AZ-06 (2023–present)
- Pat Fallon, TX-04 (2021–present)
- Tony Gonzales, TX-23 (2021–present)
- Wesley Hunt, TX-38 (2023–present)
- Ronny Jackson, TX-13 (2021–present)
- Rich McCormick, GA-07 (2023–present)
- Elise Stefanik, NY-21 (2015–present)
- Beth Van Duyne, TX-24 (2021–present)
- Randy Weber, TX-14 (2013–present)

Organizations

- Maggie's List

==== Fundraising ====
Campaign finance reports as of February 11, 2026
Candidate	Raised	Spent	Cash on hand
Keith Allen (R)	$152,475 (Note: $90,363 of this total was self-funded by Allen)	$145,304	$8,115
Luis Buentello (R)	$40,104	$29,399	$10,704
Eric Flores (R)	$1,294,218 (Note: $487,500 of this total was self-funded by Flores)	$1,123,672	$170,546
Mayra Flores (R)	$1,367,938	$1,228,999	$141,767
Gregory Kunkle (R)	$9,155	$7,853	$1,301
Source: Federal Election Commission

==== Polling ====
Poll source	Date(s) administered	Sample size	Margin of error	Eric Flores	Mayra Flores	Other	Undecided
1892 Polling (R)	–	400 (LV)	± 4.9%	5%	38%	7% (Note: Morales with 4%; Allen with 2%; Cortez with 1%)	51%

==== Results ====
Republican primary results
Party	Candidate	Votes	%
Republican	Eric Flores	20,726	56.7
Republican	Mayra Flores	8,652	23.7
Republican	Luis Buentello	1,943	5.3
Republican	Scott Mandel	1,638	4.5
Republican	Fred Hinojosa	1,395	3.8
Republican	Keith Allen	1,378	3.8
Republican	Gregory Kunkle	690	1.9
Republican	Jay Nagy	159	0.4
Total votes		36,581	100.0

=== Libertarian convention ===
==== Nominee ====
- Chris Royal, attorney, independent candidate for this seat in 2020 and 2022

=== Green convention ===
==== Nominee ====
- Eddie Espinoza, teacher and nominee for railroad commission in 2024

=== General election ===
==== Predictions ====
Source	Ranking	As of
Decision Desk HQ	Likely D	October 30, 2026
The Cook Political Report	Lean D	October 23, 2026
Inside Elections	Tossup	August 28, 2025
Sabato's Crystal Ball	Lean D	September 10, 2026
Silver Bulletin	Likely D	October 22, 2026

==== Post-primary endorsements ====
Vicente Gonzalez (D)

Labor unions

- American Federation of Government Employees

Organizations

- Democrats for Education Reform

==== Fundraising ====
Campaign finance reports as of September 30, 2026
Candidate	Raised	Spent	Cash on hand
Vicente Gonzalez (D)	$4,956,873	$3,404,113	$1,834,820
Eric Flores (R)	$3,830,063	$3,544,942	$285,096
Source: Federal Election Commission

==== Polling ====
Poll source	Date(s) administered	Sample size	Margin of error	Vicente Gonzalez (D)	Eric Flores (R)	Other	Undecided
Washington Post/Schar School	October 14–19, 2026	626 (LV)	± 5.4%	50%	43%	3% (Note: Eddie Espinoza (G) with 2%; Chris Royal (L) with 1%)	4%
Public Policy Research/Texas Southern University	August 18–22, 2026	700 (LV)	± 3.7%	45%	42%	5% (Note: Eddie Espinoza (G) with 3% and Chris Royal (L) with 2%)	8%
Ragnar Research Partners (R) (Note: Poll sponsored by Flores's campaign)	June 14–16, 2026	400 (LV)	± 5.0%	41%	44%	–	15%
co/efficient (R) (Note: Poll commissioned by the National Republican Congressional Committee)	April 25–29, 2026	777 (LV)	± 3.5%	40%	41%	–	19%

Hypothetical polling

Generic Democrat vs generic Republican

Poll source	Date(s) administered	Sample size	Margin of error	Generic Democrat	Generic Republican	Undecided
co/efficient (R)	April 25–29, 2026	777 (LV)	± 3.5%	44%	48%	8%

==== Results ====
2026 Texas's 34th congressional district election results
Party	Candidate	Votes	%
Democratic	Vicente Gonzalez (incumbent)		
Republican	Eric Flores		
Green	Eddie Espinoza		
Libertarian	Chris Royal		
Total votes			100

== District 35 ==
2026 Texas's 35th congressional district election

Nominee	Johnny Garcia	Carlos De La Cruz
Party	Democratic	Republican
Popular vote	139,984	112,574
Percentage	55.4%	44.6%
U.S. Representative before election
None
(New seat)
Elected U.S. Representative
Johnny Garcia
Democratic

Texas's 35th congressional district boundary from the 2026 elections Interactive map version

The new 35th district previously connected eastern San Antonio to southeastern Austin, through the I-35 corridor. However, with the new redistricting the 35th has been moved significantly to the south and east; it now covers much of south and northeast San Antonio, plus such suburbs as Live Oak, Converse and Elmendorf along with Guadalupe (including Seguin and Schertz), Wilson and Karnes counties.

Prior to redistricting, the incumbent was Democrat Greg Casar; however, Casar was drawn out of the 35th district and into the 37th. The new district remains majority Hispanic, albeit with over 53.7% of the voting age population being Hispanic, and 34.6% of the voting age population being White. Donald Trump won 54.6% of the vote in this district in 2024, having won by single-digit margins here in both 2016 and 2020, while Ted Cruz won 50.6% of the vote in this district in 2024.

=== Democratic primary ===
==== Nominee ====
- Johnny C. Garcia, Bexar County sheriff's deputy

==== Eliminated in runoff ====
- Maureen Galindo, family therapist, housing advocate, and candidate for San Antonio City Council in 2025

==== Eliminated in primary ====
- John Lira, U.S. Marine Corps veteran and nominee for the 23rd district in 2022 (Note: Initially endorsed Galindo in the runoff, before rescinding his support in May 2026.)
- Whitney Masterson-Moyes, businesswoman (endorsed Galindo in runoff)

==== Declined ====
- Beto Altamirano, tech entrepreneur and candidate for mayor of San Antonio in 2025
- Greg Casar, incumbent U.S. representative from the 35th district
- Philip Cortez, state representative from the 117th district (2013–2015, 2017–present) (running for re-election)
- Roland Gutierrez, state senator from the 19th district (2021–present) and candidate for U.S. senate in 2024 (running for re-election)

==== Campaign ====
The Democratic runoff race for this district gained national attention in May 2026 after multiple comments made by candidate Maureen Galindo, who led the first round of the primary, were condemned by state and national Democrats for antisemitism. On social media, Galindo pledged to turn an ICE Detention Center into a "prison for American Zionists", and later suggested on a radio broadcast that primary rival Johnny Garcia should be tried for treason due to his alleged support from Israel.

Following the remarks, John Lira, a former primary opponent who had previously endorsed Galindo, rescinded his endorsement. Prominent Democrats directly rebuked Galindo's candidacy or endorsed Garcia, including U.S. Representatives Alexandria Ocasio-Cortez, Suzan DelBene and Hakeem Jeffries, alongside Texas state representatives James Talarico and Gina Hinojosa, who are the Democratic nominees in the concurrent Senate and the gubernatorial elections respectively.

==== Endorsements ====
Maureen Galindo

U.S. Representatives

- Cynthia McKinney, GA-04 (1993–2003, 2005–2007) (Green Party)

Organizations

- ~~Track AIPAC~~ (endorsement rescinded)
Johnny Garcia

Executive branch officials

- Pete Buttigieg, U.S. secretary of transportation (2021–2025)

U.S. representatives

- Alexandria Ocasio-Cortez, NY-14 (2019–present)
- Greg Casar, TX-35 (2023–present) and chair of the Congressional Progressive Caucus
- Joaquin Castro, TX-20 (2013–present)
- Suzan DelBene, WA-01 (2012–present)
- Lloyd Doggett, TX-37 (2023–present)
- Brad Schneider, IL-10 (2017–present)

State legislators

- James Talarico, HD-50 (2023–present) and Democratic nominee for the 2026 United States Senate election in Texas
- Gina Hinojosa, HD-49 (2017–present) and Democratic nominee for the 2026 Texas gubernatorial election

Labor unions

- Texas AFL-CIO (co-endorsement with Lira)

Organizations

- Blue Dog PAC
- DCCC Red to Blue
- Democratic Majority for Israel

Newspapers

- Houston Chronicle
- San Antonio Express-News
John Lira

Labor unions

- Texas AFL-CIO (co-endorsement with Garcia)

Newspapers

- The Austin Chronicle

==== Fundraising ====
Campaign finance reports as of February 11, 2026
Candidate	Raised	Spent	Cash on hand
Maureen Galindo (D)	$4,107	$8,214	$0
Johnny Garcia (D)	$159,289	$140,036	$19,253
John Lira (D)	$132,806	$127,786	$5,020
Whitney Masterson-Moyes (D)	$61,733 (Note: $30,000 of this total was self-funded by Masterson-Moyes)	$50,925	$10,808
Source: Federal Election Commission

==== Results ====
Democratic primary results
Party	Candidate	Votes	%
Democratic	Maureen Galindo	16,009	29.2
Democratic	Johnny Garcia	14,836	27.0
Democratic	Whitney Masterson-Moyes	12,825	23.4
Democratic	John Lira	11,186	20.4
Total votes		54,856	100.0

==== Runoff results ====
Democratic primary runoff results
Party	Candidate	Votes	%
Democratic	Johnny Garcia	13,017	63.8
Democratic	Maureen Galindo	7,374	36.2
Total votes		20,391	100.0

=== Republican primary ===
==== Nominee ====
- Carlos De La Cruz, gym owner and brother of U.S. representative Monica De La Cruz

==== Eliminated in runoff ====
- John Lujan, state representative from the 118th district (2016–2017, 2021–present)

==== Eliminated in primary ====
- Randy Adams, car dealership owner
- Josh Cortez, former advisor to U.S. representative Monica De La Cruz (previously ran in the 28th district)
- Mark Eberwine, home inspector
- Jay Furman, physician and nominee for the 28th district in 2024 (previously ran in the 28th district)
- Vanessa Hicks-Callaway
- Ryan Krause, executive coach
- Larry LaRose, veteran
- Rod Lingsch, retired pilot
- Steven Wright, retired deputy sheriff and nominee for this district in 2024

==== Withdrawn ====
- Christopher Schuchardt, businessman, runner-up for mayor of San Antonio in 2023, and candidate for Bexar County commissioner in 2024

==== Declined ====
- Grant Moody, Bexar County commissioner from the 3rd precinct
- Kyle Sinclair, former vice chair of the Bexar County Republican Party, nominee for the 20th district in 2022, and candidate for the 28th district in 2024 (ran in the 21st district)
- Marc Whyte, San Antonio city councilor from the 10th district (2023–present) and candidate for Texas's 121st House of Representatives district in 2018 (endorsed Lujan)

==== Endorsements ====
Carlos De La Cruz

Executive branch officials

- Donald Trump, president of the United States (2017–2021, 2025–present)

U.S. senators

- Markwayne Mullin, Oklahoma (2023-2026)

U.S. representatives

- Jodey Arrington, TX-19 (2017–present)
- Monica De La Cruz, TX-15 (2023–present) (candidate's sister)
- Tom Emmer, House majority whip (2023–present) from MN–08 (2015–present)
- Brandon Gill, TX-26 (2025–present)
- Mike Johnson, speaker of the House (2023–present) from LA-04 (2017–present)
- Rich McCormick, GA-07 (2023–present)
- John McGuire, VA-05 (2025–present)
- Derrick Van Orden, WI-03 (2023–present)
- Randy Weber, TX-14 (2013–present)
- Rudy Yakym, IN-02 (2022–present)
- Ryan Zinke, MT-01, (2023–present)
John Lujan

U.S. representatives

- Jake Ellzey, TX-06 (2021–present)

Statewide officials

- Greg Abbott, governor of Texas (2015–present)

Local officials

- Marc Whyte, San Antonio city councilor from the 10th district (2023–present)

Newspapers

- San Antonio Express-News

==== Fundraising ====
Campaign finance reports as of February 11, 2026
Candidate	Raised	Spent	Cash on hand
Randy Adams (R)	$22,957 (Note: $20,000 of this total was self-funded by Adams)	$2,327	$20,630
Josh Cortez (R)	$246,954 (Note: $12,000 of this total was self-funded by Cortez)	$169,477	$77,476
Carlos De La Cruz (R)	$294,169 (Note: $50,000 of this total was self-funded by De La Cruz)	$230,963	$63,205
Jay Furman (R)	$396,414 (Note: $240,000 of this total was self-funded by Furman)	$354,020	$47,315
Vanessa Hicks-Callaway (R)	$6,394	$5,114	$3,514
Ryan Krause (R)	$237,646 (Note: $185,282 of this total was self-funded by Krause)	$89,055	$148,590
John Lujan (R)	$370,118 (Note: $32,000 of this total was self-funded by Lujan)	$282,690	$87,428
Steven Wright (R)	$25,375 (Note: $25,375 of this total was self-funded by Wright)	$16,944	$26,079
Source: Federal Election Commission

==== Results ====
Republican primary results
Party	Candidate	Votes	%
Republican	John Lujan	15,530	33.0
Republican	Carlos De La Cruz	12,637	26.8
Republican	Jay Furman	6,182	13.1
Republican	Ryan Krause	3,986	8.5
Republican	Josh Cortez	2,052	4.4
Republican	Steven Wright	1,889	4.0
Republican	Randy Adams	1,754	3.7
Republican	Vanessa Hicks-Callaway	1,676	3.6
Republican	Mark Eberwine	752	1.6
Republican	Rod Lindsch	365	0.8
Republican	Larry La Rose	306	0.6
Total votes		47,129	100.0

==== Runoff results ====
Republican primary runoff results
Party	Candidate	Votes	%
Republican	Carlos De La Cruz	18,927	57.6
Republican	John Lujan	13,925	42.4
Total votes		32,852	100.0

=== General election ===
==== Predictions ====
Source	Ranking	As of
Decision Desk HQ	Tossup	October 8, 2026
The Cook Political Report	Tossup	October 23, 2026
Inside Elections	Tossup	October 29, 2026
Sabato's Crystal Ball	Lean D	November 2, 2026
Silver Bulletin	Tossup	October 22, 2026

==== Post-primary endorsements ====
Johnny Garcia (D)

Individuals

- Matthew Yglesias, journalist

Labor unions

- American Federation of Government Employees
- United Auto Workers

Organizations

- J Street
- League of Conservation Voters
- CHC BOLD PAC

==== Fundraising ====
Campaign finance reports as of September 30, 2026
Candidate	Raised	Spent	Cash on hand
Johnny Garcia (D)	$1,917,104	$1,407,347	$509,758
Carlos de la Cruz (R)	$1,892,231	$1,415,736	$476,496
Source: Federal Election Commission

==== Polling ====
Poll source	Date(s) administered	Sample size	Margin of error	Carlos De La Cruz (R)	Johnny Garcia (D)	Undecided
Washington Post/Schar School	October 14–19, 2026	606 (LV)	± 6.2%	48%	47%	5%
Emerson College (Note: Poll sponsored by Poll Vault)	October 12–14, 2026	417 (LV)	–	49%	51%	–
Normington Petts (D)	October 12–14, 2026	400 (LV)	–	45%	47%	8%
Normington Petts (D)	August 27–31, 2026	500 (LV)	± 4.4%	45%	44%	11%

==== Results ====
2026 Texas's 35th congressional district election results
Party	Candidate	Votes	%
Democratic	Johnny Garcia		
Republican	Carlos De La Cruz		
Total votes			100

== District 36 ==
2026 Texas's 36th congressional district election
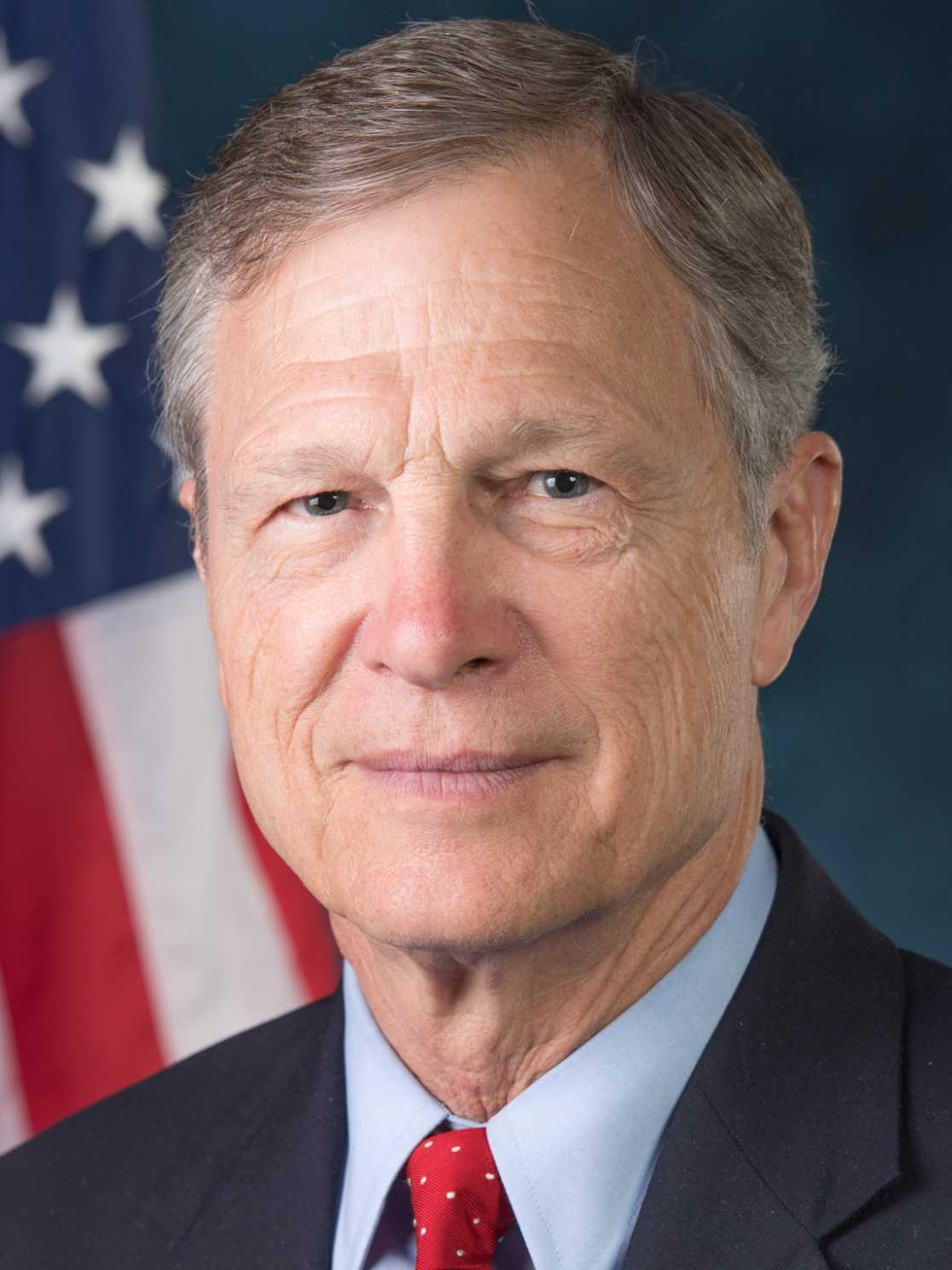

Nominee	Brian Babin	Rhonda Hart
Party	Republican	Democratic
Popular vote	138,008	119,681
Percentage	53.6%	46.4%
U.S. Representative before election
Brian Babin
Republican
Elected U.S. Representative
Brian Babin
Republican

Texas's 36th congressional district boundary from the 2026 elections Interactive map version

The new 36th district encompasses parts of Southeast Texas, including the Harris County side of the Clear Lake region of Houston. While largely unchanged from its previous iteration, the new iteration includes Lufkin and the surrounding Piney Woods region as well as Silsbee, Jasper and most of Beaumont, and also extends to almost all of Chambers County (including Mont Belvieu) east of Houston) before extending into southeast Houston (including Hobby Airport and Ellington Field, as well as Glenbrook Valley and the aforementioned Clear Lake City development) along with the southeast Harris County communities of Seabrook, Webster and Harris County's portion of Friendswood, and a small sliver of northern Brazoria County centered on most of Pearland.

The incumbent is Republican Brian Babin, who was re-elected with 69.4% of the vote in 2024. Donald Trump won 61.8% of the vote in the new district in 2024, as did Ted Cruz with 59.1% of the vote.

=== Republican primary ===
==== Nominee ====
- Brian Babin, incumbent U.S. representative

==== Eliminated in primary ====
- Jonathan Mitchell, pipeline worker and candidate for this district in 2024

==== Endorsements ====
Brian Babin

Executive branch officials

- Donald Trump, 45th and 47th president of the United States (2017–2021, 2025–present)

Statewide officials

- Greg Abbott, governor of Texas (2015–present)

Organizations

- AIPAC

Newspapers

- Houston Chronicle

==== Fundraising ====
Campaign finance reports as of February 11, 2026
Candidate	Raised	Spent	Cash on hand
Brian Babin (R)	$749,136	$525,433	$869,905
Source: Federal Election Commission

==== Results ====
Republican primary results
Party	Candidate	Votes	%
Republican	Brian Babin (incumbent)	51,074	81.1
Republican	Jonathan Mitchell	11,896	18.9
Total votes		62,970	100.0

=== Democratic primary ===
==== Nominee ====
- Rhonda Hart, homemaker and nominee for the 14th district in 2024

==== Eliminated in primary ====
- Doug Rogers, accountant

==== Endorsements ====
Doug Rogers

Labor unions

- Texas AFL-CIO

Newspapers

- Houston Chronicle

==== Fundraising ====
Campaign finance reports as of February 11, 2026
Candidate	Raised	Spent	Cash on hand
Rhonda Hart (D)	$6,125 (Note: $3,125 of this total was self-funded by Hart)	$0	$6,250
Doug Rogers (D)	$211,955 (Note: $200,000 of this total was self-funded by Rogers)	$18,651	$204,348
Source: Federal Election Commission

==== Results ====
Democratic primary results
Party	Candidate	Votes	%
Democratic	Rhonda Hart	30,587	64.2
Democratic	Doug Rogers	17,041	35.8
Total votes		47,628	100.0

=== General election ===
==== Predictions ====
Source	Ranking	As of
Decision Desk HQ	Safe R	July 14, 2026
The Cook Political Report	Solid R	February 6, 2025
Inside Elections	Solid R	March 7, 2025
Sabato's Crystal Ball	Safe R	September 18, 2025
Silver Bulletin	Solid R	October 22, 2026

==== Fundraising ====
Campaign finance reports as of April 26, 2026
Candidate	Raised	Spent	Cash on hand
Brian Babin (R)	$916,868	$632,559	$930,512
Rhonda Hart (D)	$6,550	$0	$3,937
Source: Federal Election Commission

==== Results ====
2026 Texas's 36th congressional district election results
Party	Candidate	Votes	%
Republican	Brian Babin (incumbent)		
Democratic	Rhonda Hart		
Total votes			100

== District 37 ==
2026 Texas's 37th congressional district election
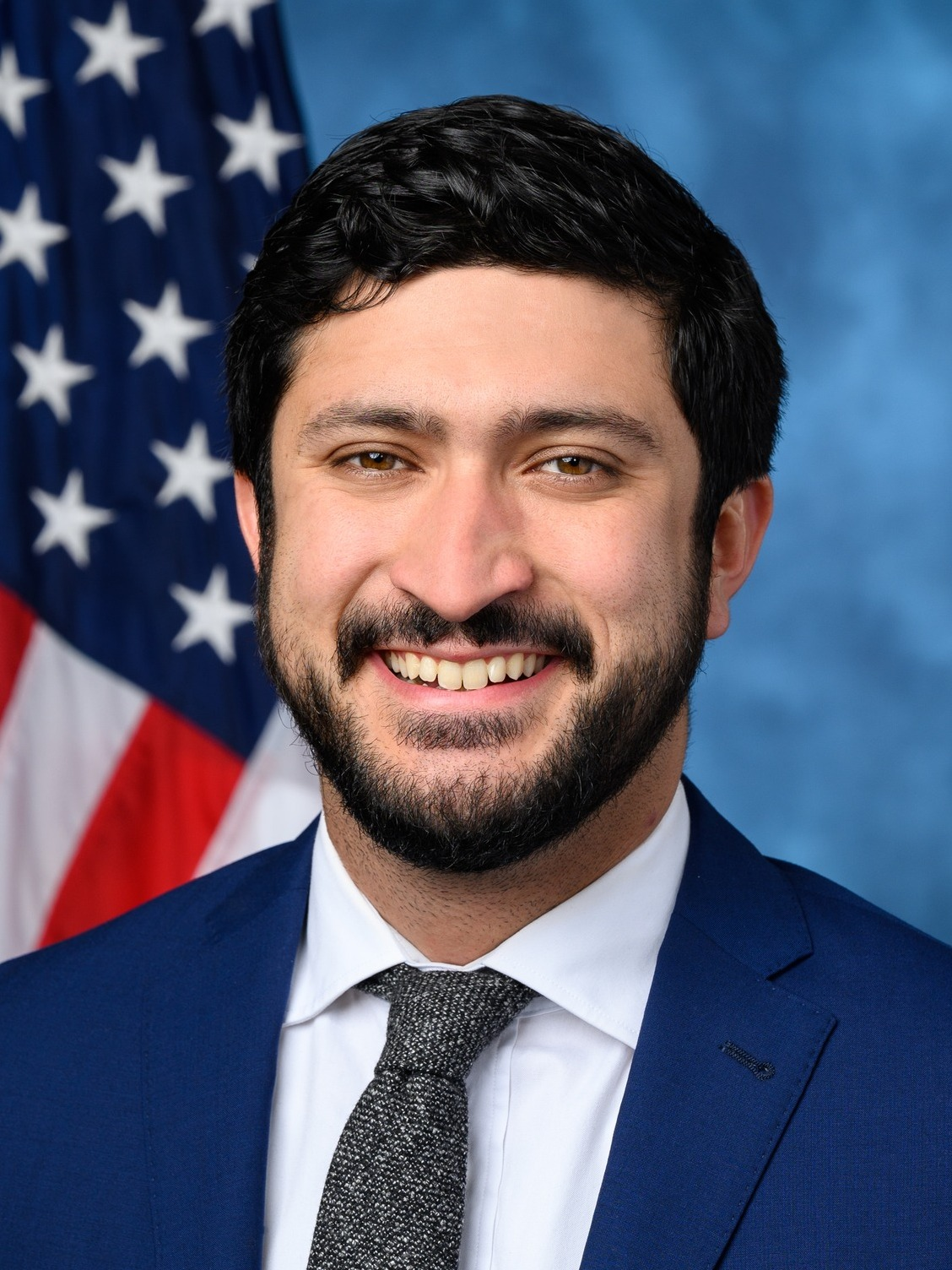

Nominee	Greg Casar	Lauren Peña
Party	Democratic	Republican
Popular vote	254,957	49,469
Percentage	83.8%	16.2%
U.S. Representative before election
Greg Casar
Democratic
Lloyd Doggett
Democratic
Elected U.S. Representative
Greg Casar
Democratic

Texas's 37th congressional district boundary from the 2026 elections Interactive map version

The new 37th district is based in all but the westernmost parts of Austin, with virtually all of the precincts of the exclusively Travis County-based district favoring Democrats to varying degrees; the new district has a White plurality with a 34% Hispanic voting age population. The incumbent is Democrat Lloyd Doggett, who was re-elected with 75.9% of the vote in 2024. On August 21, 2025, Doggett announced that he would not seek re-election due to mid-decade redistricting, and fellow Democratic Rep. Greg Casar being moved into the 37th district. On August 25, 2025, Casar announced his bid for re-election from this district. Kamala Harris won 76.8% of the vote in the new 37th District, which also gave 79.2% of the vote to Colin Allred; in both cases, the highest of any district amongst the state's new congressional districts.

=== Democratic primary ===
==== Nominee ====
- Greg Casar, incumbent U.S. representative

==== Eliminated in primary ====
- Esther Fleharty, program manager

==== Withdrawn ====
- Lloyd Doggett, incumbent U.S. representative

==== Declined ====
- Sarah Eckhardt, state senator from the 14th district (2020–present) (ran in the 10th district, then switched to comptroller of public accounts, endorsed Casar)

==== Endorsements ====
Greg Casar

U.S. representatives

- Beto O'Rourke, former U.S. representative from Texas's 16th congressional district (2013–2019)

Statewide officials

- Jim Hightower, former Texas Agriculture Commissioner (1983–1991)
- Garry Mauro, former Texas Land Commissioner (1983–1999)

State legislators

- Sheryl Cole, state representative from the 46th district (2019–present)
- Sarah Eckhardt, state senator from the 14th district (2020–present)
- Gina Hinojosa, state representative from the 49th district (2017–present)
- Donna Howard, state representative from the 48th district (2006–present)
- James Talarico, state representative from the 50th district (2018–present)

Local officials

- Kirk Watson, mayor of Austin (1997–2001, 2023–present)

Labor unions

- National Education Association
- Texas AFL-CIO

Organizations

- J Street PAC
- Justice Democrats
- League of Conservation Voters Action Fund
- Planned Parenthood Action Fund
- Progressive Democrats of America
- Track AIPAC
- University of Texas at Austin College Democrats

Newspapers

- Austin American-Statesman
- The Austin Chronicle

==== Fundraising ====
Campaign finance reports as of February 11, 2026
Candidate	Raised	Spent	Cash on hand
Greg Casar (D)	$929,283	$648,443	$651,678
Source: Federal Election Commission

==== Results ====
Democratic primary results
Party	Candidate	Votes	%
Democratic	Greg Casar (incumbent)	105,917	80.7
Democratic	Esther Fleharty	25,252	19.3
Total votes		131,169	100.0

=== Republican primary ===
==== Nominee ====
- Lauren Peña, paralegal

==== Eliminated in runoff ====
- Ge'Neill Gary, former Albany city councilwoman

==== Eliminated in primary ====
- Janet Malzahn, attorney

==== Fundraising ====
Campaign finance reports as of February 11, 2026
Candidate	Raised	Spent	Cash on hand
Ge'Neill Gary (R)	$3,929 (Note: $250 of this total was self-funded by Gary)	$3,697	$232
Janet Malzahn (R)	$5,254 (Note: $2,000 of this total was self-funded by Malzahn)	$1,509	$3,744
Lauren Peña (R)	$98,697	$94,240	$4,456
Source: Federal Election Commission

==== Results ====
Republican primary results
Party	Candidate	Votes	%
Republican	Ge'Neill Gary	5,382	35.3
Republican	Lauren Peña	5,328	35.0
Republican	Janet Malzahn	4,529	29.7
Total votes		15,239	100.0

==== Runoff results ====
Republican primary runoff results
Party	Candidate	Votes	%
Republican	Lauren Peña	6,567	58.2
Republican	Ge'Neill Gary	4,724	41.8
Total votes		11,291	100.0

=== General election ===
==== Predictions ====
Source	Ranking	As of
Decision Desk HQ	Safe D	July 14, 2026
The Cook Political Report	Solid D	February 6, 2025
Inside Elections	Solid D	March 7, 2025
Sabato's Crystal Ball	Safe D	September 18, 2025
Silver Bulletin	Solid D	October 22, 2026

==== Post-primary endorsements ====
Greg Casar (D)

Labor unions

- American Federation of Government Employees
- United Auto Workers

Organizations

- Giffords
- Our Revolution

==== Fundraising ====
Campaign finance reports as of April 26, 2026
Candidate	Raised	Spent	Cash on hand
Greg Casar (D)	$1,057,596	$705,499	$722,936
Lauren Peña (R)	$112,442	$111,242	$1,200
Source: Federal Election Commission

==== Results ====
2026 Texas's 37th congressional district election results
Party	Candidate	Votes	%
Democratic	Greg Casar (incumbent)		
Republican	Lauren Peña		
Total votes			100

== District 38 ==
2026 Texas's 38th congressional district election
Nominee	Jon Bonck	Melissa McDonough
Party	Republican	Democratic
Popular vote	157,261	144,397
Percentage	51.5%	47.3%
U.S. Representative before election
Wesley Hunt
Republican
Elected U.S. Representative
Jon Bonck
Republican

Texas's 38th congressional district boundary from the 2026 elections Interactive map version

The new 38th district, much like its original iteration first used in the 2022 election (and historically the base of the original Houston-based iteration of the 7th district from 1966 until the 2022 redistricting), is based in west Houston and northwest Harris County, including all or parts of the west Houston neighborhoods of River Oaks, Tanglewood, Memorial City, Spring Branch and the Energy Corridor, as well as the communities of Jersey Village, Copperfield, Cypress, Champion Forest, Klein and Tomball in northwest Harris County.

The incumbent is Republican Wesley Hunt, who was re-elected with 62.9% of the vote in 2024 and ran for the Republican nomination for U.S. Senate in 2026. Donald Trump won the district in 2024 with 59.5% of the vote, as did Ted Cruz (who resides in the district) with 56.6% of the vote.

=== Republican primary ===
==== Nominee ====
- Jon Bonck, mortgage broker (previously ran in the 2nd district)

==== Eliminated in runoff ====
- Shelly deZevallos, president of West Houston Airport

==== Eliminated in primary ====
- Craig Goralski, attorney
- Barrett McNabb, entrepreneur and U.S. Army veteran
- Carmen María Montiel, former Miss Venezuela and perennial candidate
- Michael Pratt, president of Tomball ISD School Board
- Larry Rubin, businessman
- Jennifer Sundt, attorney
- Jeff Yuna, pawnshop owner

==== Declined ====
- Mano DeAyala, state representative from the 133rd district (2023–present) (running for re-election)
- Wesley Hunt, incumbent U.S. representative (ran for U.S. Senate)

==== Endorsements ====
Jon Bonck

Executive branch officials

- Donald Trump, president of the United States (2017–2021, 2025–present)

U.S. senators

- Ted Cruz, U.S. senator from Texas (2013–present)

U.S. representatives

- Mark Alford, MO-04 (2023–present)
- Jodey Arrington, TX-19 (2017–present)
- Tim Burchett, TN-02 (2019–present)
- Eric Burlison, MO-07 (2023–present)
- Tom Emmer, House majority whip (2023–present) from MN–08 (2015–present)
- Brandon Gill, TX-26 (2025–present)
- Ronny Jackson, TX-13 (2021–present)
- Mike Johnson, speaker of the House (2023–present) from LA-04 (2017–present)
- Jim Jordan, OH-04 (2007–present)
- Lisa McClain, MI-09 (2021–present)
- David McIntosh, former IN-02 (1995–2001)
- Mary Miller, IL-15 (2021–present)
- Steve Scalise, House majority leader (2023–present) from LA-01 (2008–present)
- Pete Sessions, TX-17 (1997–2019, 2021–present)
- Roger Williams, TX-25 (2013–present)

Organizations

- Club for Growth PAC
- Turning Point Action
Shelley deZevallos

U.S. representatives

- John Culberson, former TX-07 (2001–2019)
- Jake Ellzey, TX-06 (2021–present)
- Sam Graves, MO-06 (2001–present)
- Troy Nehls, TX-22 (2021–present)
- Randy Weber, TX-14 (2013–present)
Larry Rubin

Newspapers

- Houston Chronicle

==== Fundraising ====
Campaign finance reports as of February 11, 2026
Candidate	Raised	Spent	Cash on hand
Jon Bonck (R)	$1,075,937 (Note: $330,000 of this total was self-funded by Bonck)	$679,301	$396,635
Shelly deZevallos (R)	$765,098 (Note: $350,000 of this total was self-funded by deZevallos)	$421,910	$343,187
Barrett McNabb (R)	$348,059 (Note: $225,100 of this total was self-funded by McNabb)	$325,625	$22,433
Carmen Maria Montiel (R)	$105,265	$90,093	$15,614
Michael Pratt (R)	$371,358 (Note: $280,000 of this total was self-funded by Pratt)	$68,294	$303,063
Larry Rubin (R)	$349,646 (Note: $164,000 of this total was self-funded by Pratt)	$272,196	$77,449
Jeff Yuna (R)	$85,738 (Note: $72,480 of this total was self-funded by Yuna)	$32,523	$4,008
Source: Federal Election Commission

==== Polling ====
Poll source	Date(s) administered	Sample size	Margin of error	John Bonck	Shelley deZavallos	Michael Pratt	Larry Rubin	Other	Undecided
University of Houston	February 03–10, 2026	800 (LV)	± 3.5%	22%	10%	8%	3%	7% (Note: Montiel with 3%; Others with 4%)	50%

==== Results ====
Republican primary results
Party	Candidate	Votes	%
Republican	Jon Bonck	28,762	46.8
Republican	Shelly deZevallos	11,575	18.8
Republican	Michael Pratt	6,561	10.7
Republican	Larry Rubin	4,316	7.0
Republican	Barrett McNabb	3,929	6.4
Republican	Jennifer Sundt	1,492	2.4
Republican	Carmen María Montiel	1,455	2.4
Republican	Jeff Yuna	1,422	2.3
Republican	Craig Goralski	967	1.6
Republican	Avery Ayers	930	1.5
Total votes		61,409	100.0

==== Runoff polling ====
Poll source	Date(s) administered	Sample size	Margin of error	John Bonck	Shelley deZavallos	Undecided
Pulse Decision Science (Note: Poll sponsored by the Club for Growth, which supports Bonck)	May 5–6, 2026	402 (LV)	± 4.9%	47%	16%	37%

==== Runoff results ====
Republican primary runoff results
Party	Candidate	Votes	%
Republican	Jon Bonck	31,855	64.8
Republican	Shelly deZevallos	17,340	35.3
Total votes		49,195	100.0

=== Democratic primary ===
==== Nominee ====
- Melissa McDonough, realtor and nominee for this district in 2024

==== Eliminated in primary ====
- Theresa Courts, high school counselor
- Marvalette Hunter, former chief of staff to then-Houston mayor Sylvester Turner

==== Endorsements ====
Marvalette Hunter

U.S. representatives

- Sylvia Garcia, TX-29 (2019–present)

Labor unions

- Houston LGBTQ+ Political Caucus
- Texas AFL-CIO
Melissa McDonough

Newspapers

- Houston Chronicle

==== Fundraising ====
Campaign finance reports as of February 11, 2026
Candidate	Raised	Spent	Cash on hand
Theresa Courts (D)	$4,435	$4,241	$96
Marvalette Hunter (D)	$128,389	$98,446	$29,942
Melissa McDonough (D)	$41,932	$29,009	$35,623
Source: Federal Election Commission

==== Results ====
Democratic primary results
Party	Candidate	Votes	%
Democratic	Melissa McDonough	27,073	51.6
Democratic	Marvalette Hunter	14,828	28.3
Democratic	Theresa Courts	10,517	20.1
Total votes		52,418	100.0

=== Independents and third-party candidates ===
==== Filed paperwork ====
- Alex McMenemy (Green)
- William Taggart (Independent), engineer and author

=== General election ===
==== Predictions ====
Source	Ranking	As of
Decision Desk HQ	Likely R	October 27, 2026
The Cook Political Report	Solid R	February 6, 2025
Inside Elections	Solid R	March 7, 2025
Sabato's Crystal Ball	Safe R	September 18, 2025
Silver Bulletin	Solid R	October 22, 2026

==== Fundraising ====
Campaign finance reports as of September 30, 2026
Candidate	Raised	Spent	Cash on hand
Jon Bonck (R)	$2,171,138	$1,840,998	$330,140
Melissa McDonough (D)	$117,069	$79,696	$60,074
Source: Federal Election Commission

==== Results ====
2026 Texas's 38th congressional district election results
Party	Candidate	Votes	%
Republican	Jon Bonck		
Democratic	Melissa McDonough		
Total votes			100

== Notes ==
Partisan clients
