= 2009 Houston mayoral election =

- November 3, 2009 (first round); December 12, 2009 (runoff)
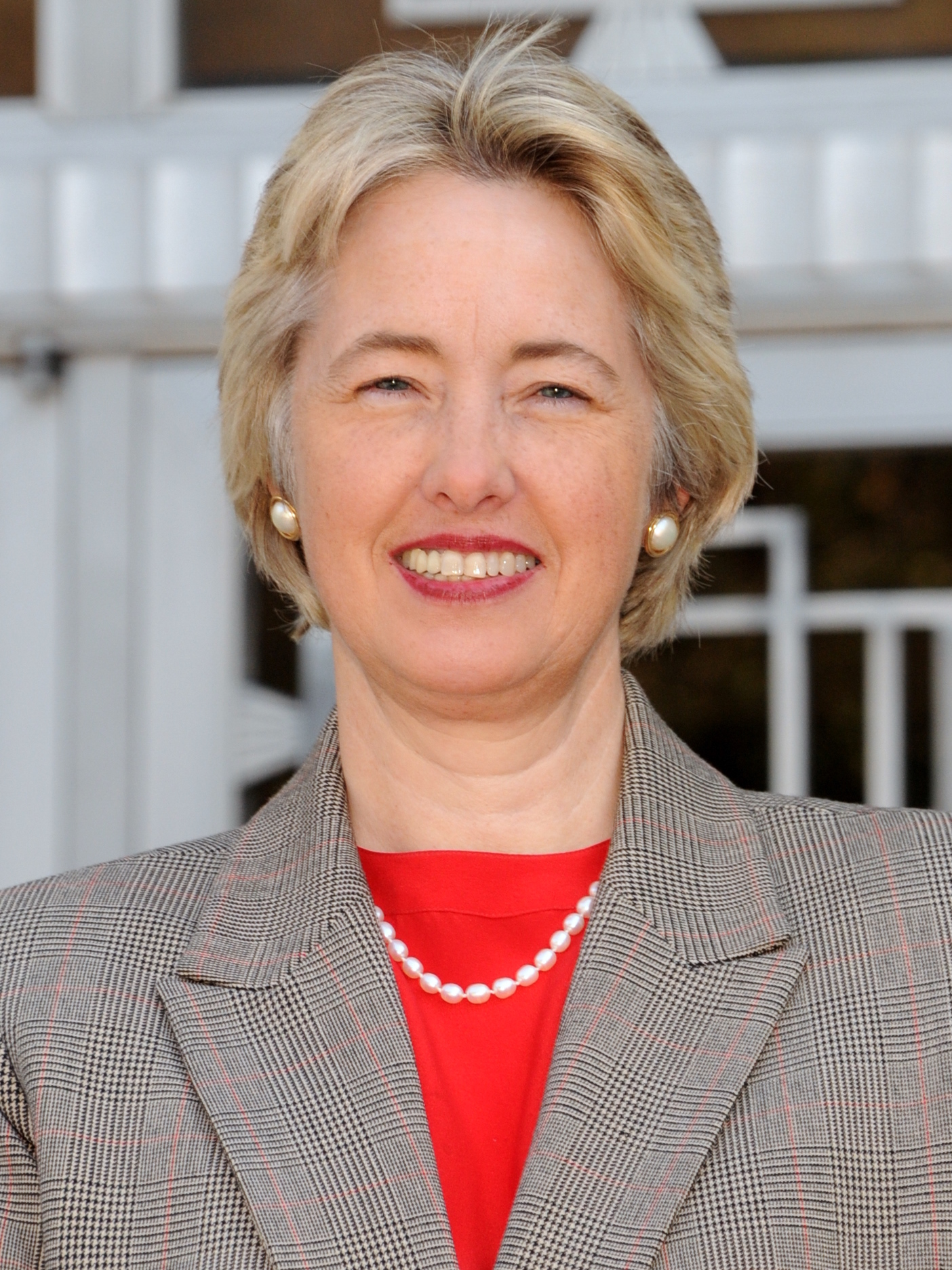

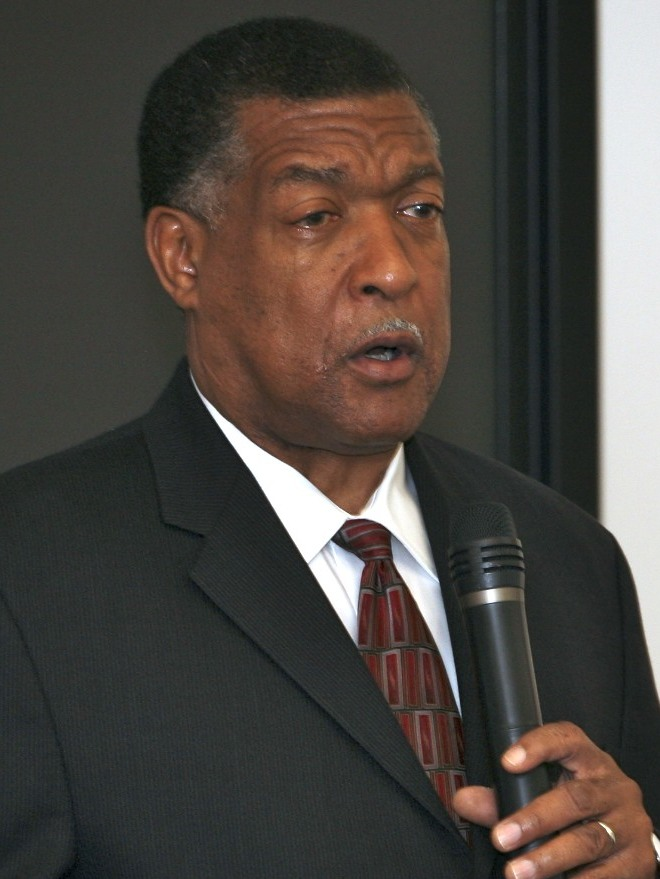

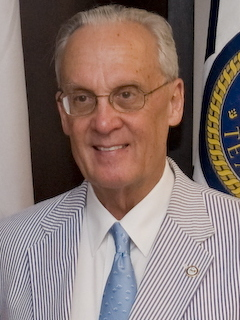

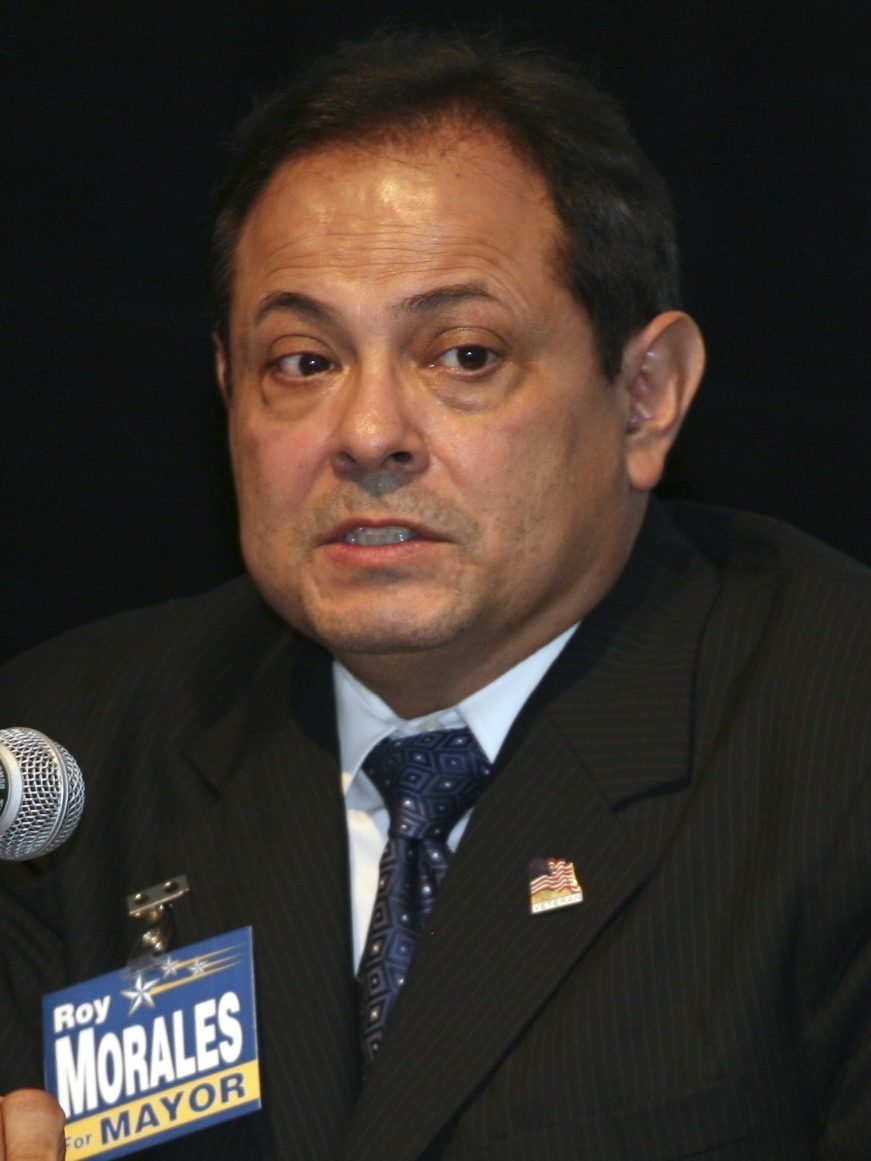
Candidate	Annise Parker	Gene Locke
First round	54,193; 30.62%	45,954; 25.97%
Runoff	81,743; 53.60%	70,770; 46.40%
Candidate	Peter Brown	Roy Morales
First round	39,904; 22.55%	35,925; 20.30%
Runoff	Eliminated	Eliminated
Mayor before election
Bill White
Elected mayor
Annise Parker

The 2009 Houston mayoral election took place on November 3, 2009, to elect the successor to incumbent Mayor Bill White. White was ineligible for re-election, having served three terms. The race is officially nonpartisan. After no candidate received a majority of the votes, the top two candidates – City Controller Annise Parker and former City Attorney Gene Locke – faced each other in a runoff election on December 12, 2009. On November 11, councilman Peter Brown (who finished third in the first round) publicly endorsed Parker in the Mayor's race. Annise Parker won the run-off.

With the election, Houston became the largest city to elect an openly gay mayor.

== Candidates ==
Candidates listed in order of how they appear on the official ballot.

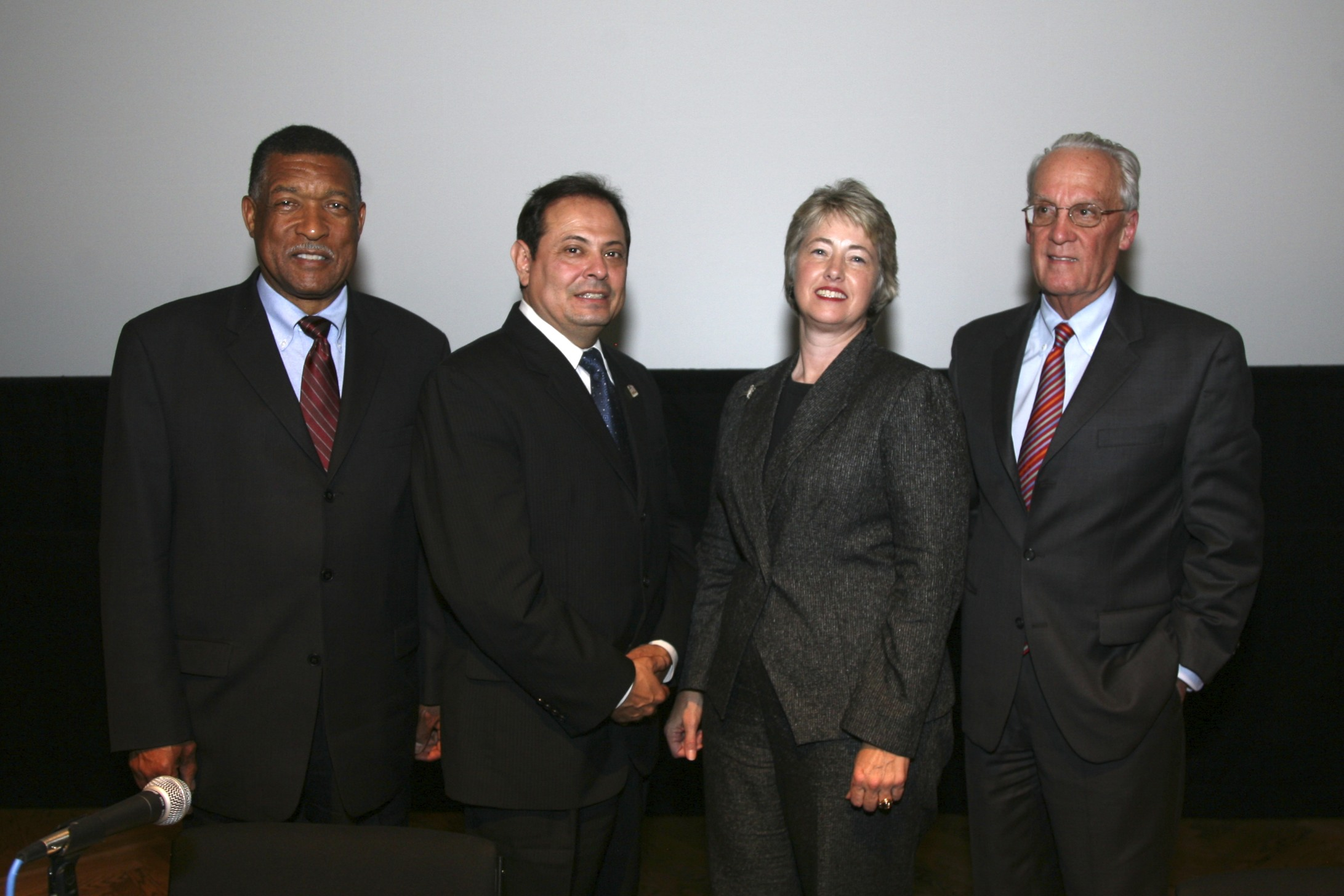
Houston mayoral candidates (from left to right) Gene Locke, Roy Morales, Annise Parker, and Peter Brown at a May 2009 debate.

- City Councilman Peter Brown
- Amanda Ulman
- Luis Ullrich
- Dan Cupp
- Education Trustee Roy Morales
- City Controller Annise Parker
- Former City Attorney Gene Locke

== Results ==
=== General election ===
2009 Houston mayoral election
Party	Candidate	Votes	%
Nonpartisan	Annise Parker	54,193	30.62
Nonpartisan	Gene Locke	45,954	25.97
Nonpartisan	Peter Brown	39,904	22.55
Nonpartisan	Roy Morales	35,925	20.30
Nonpartisan	Amanda Ulman	992	0.56
Total votes		176,968	100.00

=== Runoff results ===
2009 Houston mayoral election runoff
Party	Candidate	Votes	%
Nonpartisan	Annise Parker	81,743	53.60%
Nonpartisan	Gene Locke	70,770	46.40%
Total votes		152,513	100.00

== Endorsements ==
Peter Brown
- State Representative Alma Allen
- Former Houston Police Chief C.O. Bradford
- Former Ambassador Edward Djerejian
- Former City Councilman Jim Greenwood
- Houston Councilman Jarvis Johnson
- Former Congressman Nick Lampson
- Congressman Solomon Ortiz
- Harris County Attorney Vince Ryan
Gene Locke
- Activist Quanell X
- Former Mayor Lee Brown
- State Senator Rodney Ellis
- Congressman Al Green
- Former City Attorney Ben Hall
- Former Mayor Bob Lanier
Roy Morales
- Mayor of Katy Don Elder
- Former Mayoral Candidate TJ Huntley
- Former City Councilman Larry McKaskle
- Former State Representative Martha Wong
Annise Parker
- Former Congressman Chris Bell
- City Councilman and Former Mayoral Candidate Peter Brown
- Former City Councilman John Castillo
- Former City Controller Leonel Castillo
- State Representative Ellen Cohen
- State Representative Garnet Coleman
- State Representative Jessica Farrar
- State Representative Scott Hochberg
- City Councilwoman Toni Lawrence
- City Councilwoman Sue Lovell
- City Councilwoman Melissa Noriega
- State Representative Rick Noriega
- Former Ambassador Arthur Schechter
- Former Mayor Kathy Whitmire
- Houston Astros owner Drayton McLane

== Polling ==
=== Pre-election polling ===
Source	Error margin	Date	Peter Brown (D)	Gene Locke (D)	Roy Morales (R)	Annise Parker (D)
Houston Chronicle and Zogby International	+/- 4.1%	October 18, 2009	23.8%	13.1%	6.7%	19.0%
11 News/ KUHF Houston Public Radio poll	+/- 4.2%	October 27, 2009	24%	14%	5%	16%

== Aftermath ==
Parker was re-elected in 2011 and 2013. Locke served as Harris County interim commissioner in 2016, finishing the term of El Franco Lee, who had died unexpectedly in January of that year.

== See also ==
- 2009 Houston elections
