= 2009 Houston elections =

The 2009 Houston elections took place on May 9, June 12, and November 3, 2009. All City Council Posts, the City Controller, and the Mayor all had elections. All positions are non-partisan.

== Mayor ==
Candidates listed in order of how they appear on the official ballot.

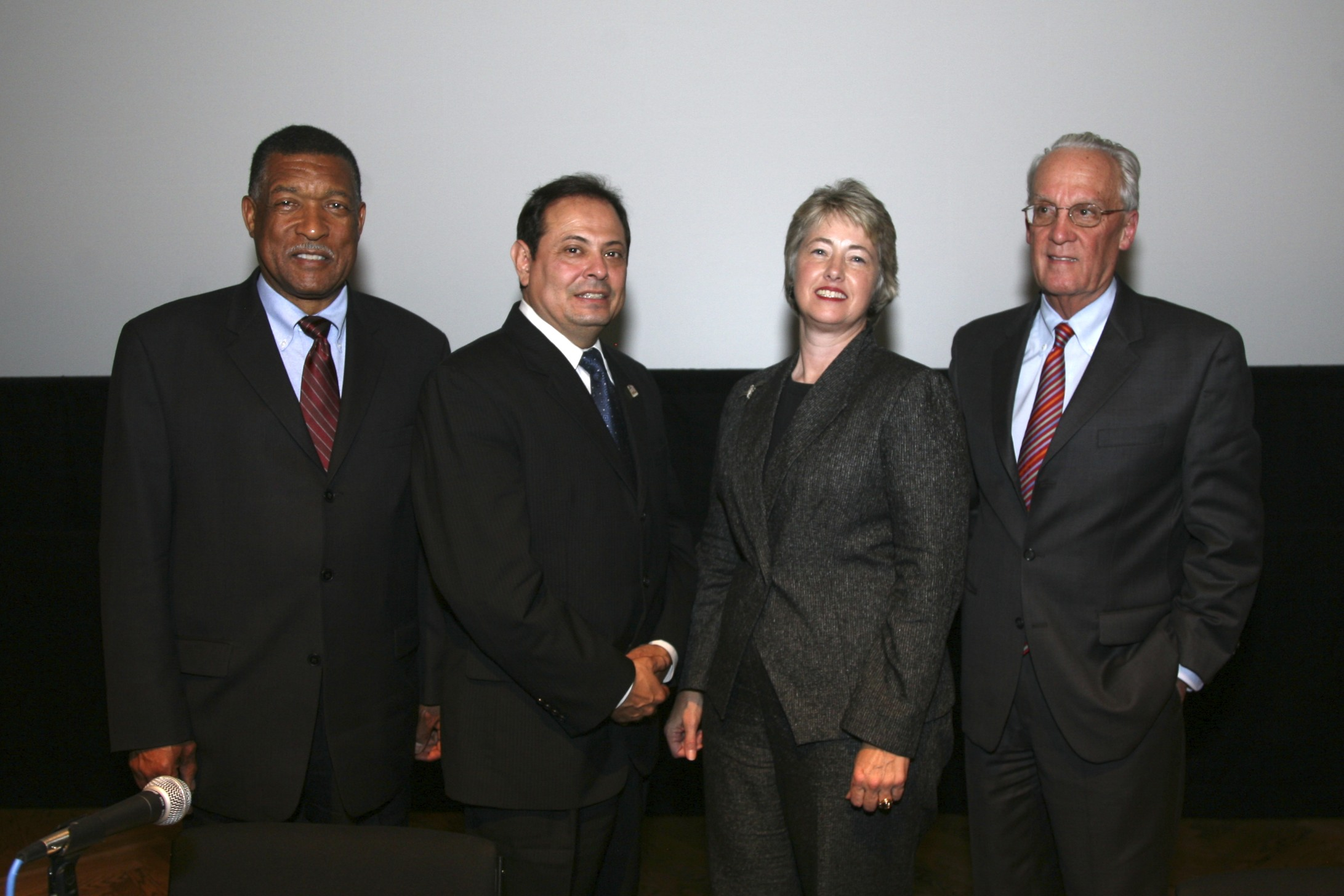
Houston mayoral candidates (from left to right) Gene Locke, Roy Morales, Annise Parker, and Peter Brown at a May 2009 debate.

- City Councilman Peter Brown
- Amanda Ulman
- Luis Ullrich
- Dan Cupp
- Education Trustee Roy Morales
- City Controller Annise Parker
- Former City Attorney Gene Locke

== City Controller ==
Incumbent Controller Annise Parker was unable to run for a fourth term due to term limits. She ran for Mayor.

=== Candidates ===
- City Councilman Ronald Green
- City Councilwoman Pam Holm
- City Councilman M. J. Khan

== City Council At-large 1 ==
Incumbent Peter Brown did not be seek a third term because he was running for Mayor.

=== Candidates ===
- Lonnie Allsbrooks
- Brad Batteau
- Don Cook
- Stephen Costello
- Karen Derr
- Education Trustee Herman Litt
- Kenneth Perkins
- Rick Rodriguez

=== Endorsements ===
List of people who endorsed Karen Derr

Derr's endorsers include:

- State Representative Jessica Farrar

List of people who endorsed Herman Litt

Litt's endorsers include:

- State Representative Alma Allen
- Former Congressman Chris Bell
- State Representative Ellen Cohen
- Former State Representative Paul Colbert
- Former Mayor Fred Hofheinz
- Former Mayor Bob Lanier
- City Councilwoman Melissa Noriega
- Former State Representative Rick Noriega
- Former City Councilman Gordon Quan
- Harris County Attorney Vince Ryan
- Former Ambassador Arthur Schechter
- Former State Representative Sue Schechter

List of people who endorsed Rick Rodriguez

Rodriguez's endorsers include:

- State Representative Carol Alvarado
- State Senator Mario Gallegos
- City Councilman James Rodriguez
- Former City Councilman Felix Fraga

=== Results ===
2009 Houston City Council At-large 1 election
Party	Candidate	Votes	%	±%
None	Stephen Costello	30,672	24%	
None	Karen Derr	25,227	20%	
None	Herman Litt	19,014	15%	
None	Rick Rodriguez	18,330	15%	
None	Don Cook	12,195	10%	
None	Kenneth Perkins	10,396	9%	
None	Brad Batteau	7,725	6%	
None	Lonnie Allsbrook	3,128	2%	

== City Council At-large 2 ==
Incumbent Sue Lovell will be seeking a third term.

=== Candidates ===
- Andrew Burks
- Michael Griffin
- Incumbent City Councilwoman Sue Lovell
- Rozzy Shorter

== City Council At-large 3 ==
Incumbent Melissa Noriega will be seeking a second full term. So far she is unopposed.

=== Candidates ===
- Incumbent City Councilwoman Melissa Noriega

== City Council At-large 4 ==
Incumbent Ronald Green will be unable to run for a fourth term due to term limits. He is running for City Controller.

=== Candidates ===
- Clarence Bradford
- Noel Freeman
- Curtis Garmon
- Deborah Shafto

=== Endorsements ===
List of people who endorsed Noel Freeman

Freeman's endorsers include:

- City Councilmember Melissa Noriega
- City Controller Annise Parker

== City Council At-large 5 ==
Incumbent Jolanda Jones will be seeking a second term.

=== Candidates ===
- Jack Christie
- Dr. Davetta Daniels
- Incumbent City Councilwoman Jolanda Jones
- Carlos Obando

=== Endorsements ===
List of people who endorsed Jolanda Jones

Jones's endorsers include:

- Mayor Bill White
- Former Mayor Lee Brown
- Former Congressman Chris Bell
- State Senator Mario Gallegos
- State Senator John Whitmire
- State Representative Carol Alvarado
- State Representative Garnet Coleman
- State Representative Jessica Farrar
- State Representative Senfronia Thompson
- Former City Councilmember Rob Todd

== City Council District A ==
Incumbent Toni Lawrence will be unable to run for a fourth term due to term limits.

=== Candidates ===
- Jeff Downing
- Lane Lewis
- Amy Peck
- Darrel Rodriguez
- Bob Schoellkopf
- Brenda Stardig
- Alex Wathen

=== Results ===
2009 Houston City Council District A election
Party	Candidate	Votes	%	±%
None	Brenda Stardig	5,745	32%	
None	Lane Lewis	3,929	22%	
None	Amy Peck	2,879	16%	
None	Jeff Downing	2,367	13%	
None	Darrell Rodriguez	1,387	8%	
None	Bob Schoellkopf	950	5%	
None	Alex Wathen	769	4%	

== City Council District B ==
Incumbent Jarvis Johnson will be seeking a third term. So far he is unopposed.

=== Candidates ===
- Roger Bowden
- Incumbent City Councilman Jarvis Johnson

=== Results ===
2009 Houston City Council District B election
Party	Candidate	Votes	%	±%
None	Jarvis Johnson	10,014	82%	
None	Roger Bowden	2,199	18%	

== City Council District C ==
Incumbent Anne Clutterbuck will be seeking a third term.

=== Candidates ===
- Incumbent City Councilwoman Anne Clutterbuck
- Randolph Locke

There also is an official write-in candidate for the District C race:

- Alfred Molison

=== Results ===
2009 Houston City Council District C election
Party	Candidate	Votes	%	±%
None	Anne Clutterbuck	17,644	82%	
None	Randy Locke	3,777	17%	
None	Alfred Molison	156	1%	

== City Council District D ==
Incumbent Wanda Adams will be seeking a second term.

=== Candidates ===
- Incumbent City Councilwoman Wanda Adams
- Larry McKinzie
- Jordan Otis

=== Results ===
2009 Houston City Council District D election
Party	Candidate	Votes	%	±%
None	Wanda Adams	15,995	78%	
None	Larry McKinzie	2,333	11%	
None	Jordan Otis	2,290	11%	

== City Council District E ==
Incumbent Mike Sullivan will be seeking a second term.

=== Candidates ===
- Wayne Garrison
- Incumbent City Councilman Mike Sullivan

=== Results ===
2009 Houston City Council District E election
Party	Candidate	Votes	%	±%
None	Mike Sullivan	14,801	74%	
None	Wayne Garrison	5,166	26%	

== City Council District F ==
Incumbent M. J. Khan will be unable to run for a fourth term due to term limits. He is running for City Controller.

=== Candidates ===
- Peter Acquaro
- Lewis Cook
- Joe Chow
- Al Hoang
- Robert Kane
- Khalid Khan
- Mike Laster

=== Results ===
2009 Houston City Council District F election
Party	Candidate	Votes	%	±%
None	Mike Laster	2,436	26%	
None	Al Hoang	2,351	25%	
None	Khalid Khan	1,859	19%	
None	Joe Chow	1,061	11%	
None	Lewis Cook	778	8%	
None	Robert Kane	536	6%	
None	Peter Acquaro	533	5%	

== City Council District G ==
Incumbent Pam Holm will be unable to run for a fourth term due to term limits. She is running for City Controller.

=== Candidates ===
- George Foulard
- Dexter Handy
- Oliver Pennington
- Richard Sedita
- Education Trustee Mills Worsham

=== Results ===
2009 Houston City Council District G election
Party	Candidate	Votes	%	±%
None	Oliver Pennington	15,880	59%	
None	Mills Worsham	4,772	18%	
None	George Foulard	2,870	11%	
None	Richard Sedita	1,679	6%	
None	Dexter Handy	1,675	6%	

== City Council District H ==
Before the end of his term, Adrian Garcia resigned to become the Harris County sheriff. After a crowded special election, Edward Gonzalez and Maverick Welsh went into a runoff. Gonzalez won the runoff and now is going to general election unopposed.

=== Candidates ===
==== Special election ====
- Gonzalo Camacho
- Yolanda Navarro Flores
- James Partsch-Galvan
- Lupe Garcia
- Edward Gonzalez
- Hugo Mojica
- Rick Rodriguez
- Maverick Welsh
- Larry Williams

==== General election ====
- Incumbent City Councilman Edward Gonzalez (Democratic)

=== Results ===
2009 Houston City Council District H special election
Party	Candidate	Votes	%	±%
None	Edward Gonzalez	1,298	31%	
None	Maverick Welsh	1,115	27%	
None	Yolanda Navarro-Flores	757	18%	
None	Rick Rodriguez	395	10%	
None	Larry Williams	310	7%	
None	Lupe Garcia	111	3%	
None	Gonzalo Camacho	109	3%	
None	Hugo Mojica	37	1%	

2009 Houston City Council District H special run-off election
Party	Candidate	Votes	%	±%
None	Edward Gonzalez	2,854	61%	
None	Maverick Welsh	1,826	39%	

2009 Houston City Council District H election
Party	Candidate	Votes	%	±%
None	Ed Gonzalez	9,379	100%	

== City Council District I ==
Incumbent James Rodriguez will be seeking a second term. So far he is unopposed.

=== Candidates ===
- Incumbent City Councilman James Rodriguez

=== Results ===
2009 Houston City Council District I election
Party	Candidate	Votes	%	±%
None	James Rodriguez	6,016	100%	
