= 2013 Houston mayoral election =

- November 5, 2013
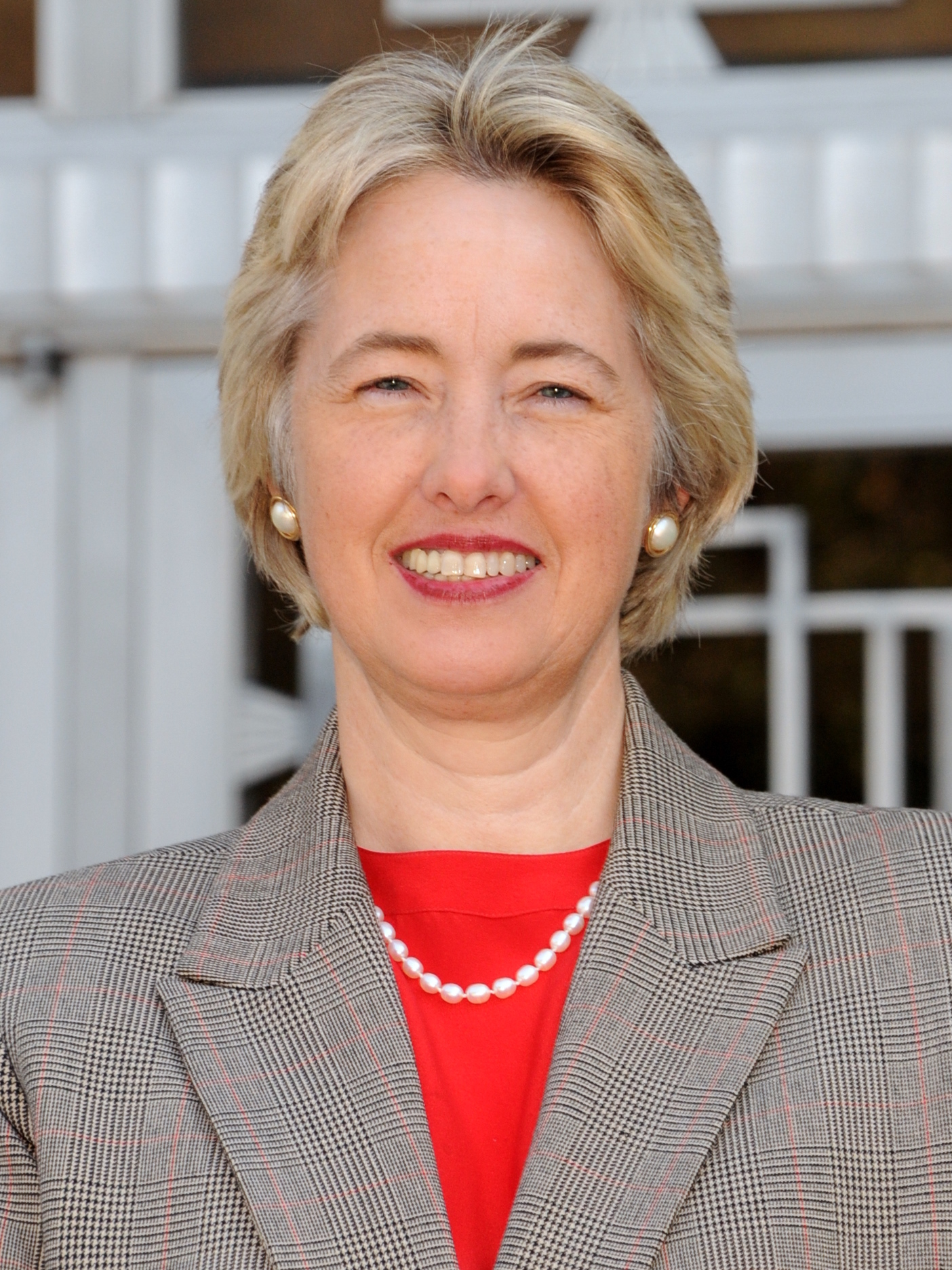

Candidate	Annise Parker	Ben Hall	Eric Dick
Popular vote	97,009	46,775	18,302
Percentage	57.22%	27.59%	10.79%
Mayor before election
Annise Parker
Elected mayor
Annise Parker

The 2013 Houston mayoral election took place on November 5, 2013. The incumbent Mayor Annise Parker was re-elected to a third, and final, two-year term in office.

== Candidates ==
Declared candidates included:

- Don Cook (Green)
- Eric Dick (Republican)
- Keryl Burgess Douglas
- Michael J. Fitzsimmons (Socialist)
- Ben Hall, former City Attorney (Democratic)
- Victoria Lane
- Annise Parker, incumbent Mayor (Democratic)

== Endorsements ==
List of people who endorsed Annise Parker

Parker's endorsers included:

Organizations:

- American Council of Engineering Companies – Houston
- Annie's List
- Christians For Better Government
- Democracy For America
- Democracy for Houston
- EMILY's List
- Gay & Lesbian Victory Fund
- Greater Harris County Democrats
- Greater Houston Home Builders' Association
- Harris County AFL-CIO
- Harris County Council of Organizations
- Harris County Tejano Democrats
- Houston Apartment Association
- Houston Association of Realtors
- Houston Building Owners and Managers Association (BOMA)
- Houston Contractor's Association
- Houston Educational Support Personnel (HESP) Union, Local 6315
- Houston Police Officers Union
- Houston Stonewall Young Democrats
- Houstonians for Responsible Growth
- Human Rights Campaign
- Ironworkers Local 84
- Key PAC
- LPAC
- Montrose Area Democrats
- Planned Parenthood
- Planned Parenthood Gulf Coast Action Fund
- Reinforcing Iron Workers Local 847
- Small Independent Motel Owners Association
- UNITE HERE! Local 23
- Women's Campaign Fund

Newspapers:

- Houston Chronicle

Individuals:

- Jay K. Aiyer, former HCC Trustee
- Chris Bell, former Congressman
- Peter Brown, former Councilmember
- Ryan Chase, radio host of 104.1 KRBE
- Roula Christie, radio host of 104.1 KRBE
- Ellen Cohen, Councilmember
- Garnet Coleman, State Rep.
- Stephen Costello, Councilmember
- Debra Danburg, former State Rep.
- Anna Eastman, HISD Trustee
- Ada Edwards, former Councilmember
- Jessica Farrar, State Rep.
- Sylvia Garcia, State Sen.
- Ed Gonzalez, Councilmember
- Paula Harris, HISD Trustee
- Ana Hernandez, State Rep.
- Al Hoang, Councilmember
- Scott Hochberg, former State Rep.
- Dwight Jefferson, former State District Judge
- Debby Kerner, HCDE Trustee
- Erica Lee, HCDE Trustee
- Glen Maxey, former State Rep.
- Borris Miles, State Rep.
- Richard Morrison, Ft. Bend County Commissioner
- Danny Nguyen, Missouri City Councilmember
- Barack Obama, U.S. President
- James Rodriguez, Councilmember
- Vince Ryan, Harris County Attorney
- Graciela Saen, former Councilmember
- Arthur Schechter, Ambassador
- Juliet Stipeche, HISD Trustee
- Kristi Thibaut, former State Rep.
- Diane Trautman, HCDE Trustee
- Gene Wu, State Rep.
List of people who endorsed Ben Hall

Hall's endorsers included:

Organizations:

- African-American Police Officers League

Individuals:

- Yolanda Adams
- Levi Benton, former judge
- Clarence Bradford, City Councilmember
- Lee P. Brown, former mayor
- Reuben Davis, Constable
- Carol Mims Galloway, HISD Trustee
- Al Green, Congressman
- Jarvis Johnson, former City Councilmember
- Michael Kubosh, City Council candidate
- Drayton McLane, former Houston Astros owner
- Chris Oliver, HCC Trustee
- Solomon Ortiz, former Congressman
- Rod Paige, former United States Secretary of Education
- Alan Rosen, Constable
- Mary Walker, Constable
- Walton and Johnson of KPRC 950, radio hosts
- Craig Washington, former Congressman
- David West, former judge
- Michael P. Williams, HCC Trustee
- Alvin Zimmerman, former judge

== Results ==
Candidate	Vote number	Vote percentage
Annise D. Parker (inc.)	97,009	57.22%
Ben Hall	46,775	27.59%
Eric B. Dick	18,302	10.79%
Victoria Lane	1,782	1.05%
Don Cook	1,720	1.01%
Keryl Burgess Douglas	1,192	0.70%
Michael Fitzsimmons	1,179	0.70%
Derek A. Jenkins	823	0.49%
Charyl L. Drab	767	0.45%

== See also ==
- Politics of Houston
- Houston City Council
