= 2005 Houston elections =

The 2005 Houston elections took place on November 8, 2005, with runoffs taking place on December 10, 2005. All City Council posts, the City Controller, and the Mayor all had elections. All positions were non-partisan.

== Mayor ==
See 2005 Houston mayoral election

== City Controller ==
The 2005 Houston City Controller election was a non disputed election with Incumbent Annise Parker being re-elected to a second term with 100% of the vote.

2005 Houston City Controller election
Party	Candidate	Votes	%	±%
None	Annise Parker	134,514	100%	

== City Council At-large 1 ==
In the 2005 Houston City Council At-large 1 election, Peter Hoyt Brown was elected to his first term without a runoff. Brown replaced Council Member Mark Ellis, who was term-limited.

2005 Houston City Council At-large 1 election
Party	Candidate	Votes	%	±%
None	Peter Hoyt Brown	77,793	51.03%	
None	Roy Morales	48,644	31.91%	
None	Michael "Griff" Griffin	26,003	17.06%	

== City Council At-large 2 ==
In the 2005 Houston City Council At-large 2 election, Sue Lovell was elected.

2005 Houston City Council At-large 2 election
Party	Candidate	Votes	%	±%
None	Sue Lovell		32.26%	
None	Jay Aiyer		26.19%	
None	Poli Acosta		17.51%	
None	John Elford		14.07%	
None	James B. Neal		9.97%	

2005 Houston City Council At-large 2 run-off election
Party	Candidate	Votes	%	±%
None	Sue Lovell		50.94%	
None	Jay Aiyer		49.06%	

== City Council At-large 4 ==
2005 Houston City Council At-large 4 election
Party	Candidate	Votes	%	±%
None	Ronald Green		100%	

== City Council District D ==
2005 Houston City Council District D election
Party	Candidate	Votes	%	±%
None	Ada Edwards		100%	

== City Council District E ==
2005 Houston City Council District E election
Party	Candidate	Votes	%	±%
None	Addie Wiseman		100%	

== City Council District G ==
2005 Houston City Council District G election
Party	Candidate	Votes	%	±%
None	Pam Holm		100%	
