= 2007 Houston mayoral election =

- November 6, 2007
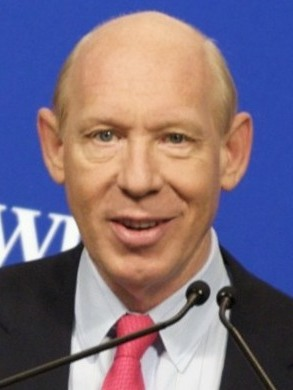

Candidate	Bill White	Amanda Ulman	Outlaw Jose Wales
Popular vote	101,277	8,798	7,023
Percentage	87%	7%	6%
Mayor before election
Bill White
Elected mayor
Bill White

The 2007 Houston mayoral election took place on November 6, 2007. Incumbent Mayor Bill White was re-elected to a third term. Officially the race was non-partisan, but Mayor White is a member of the Democratic Party.

== Candidates ==
- Incumbent Mayor Bill White:

White was the 60th Mayor of Houston. His platform included promoting energy efficient and affordable housing, reducing violent crime, and reductions to traffic congestion.

- Amanda Ulman:

Ulman, a meat-packing plant worker, represented the Socialist Workers Party. Her platform included amnesty for illegal immigrants, ending the Iraq War and public works projects to give jobs to the unemployed.

- Outlaw Josey Wales IV:

Wales, a contract engineer and professional wrestling promoter, ran as an independent. Wales legally changed his name to Outlaw Josey Wales in 1998. He had run for mayor before in 1999, having received 19,741 votes, around 10%. Wale's platform included increasing the pay of police officers, making it illegal to drive while using a cellphone, and stricter enforcement of carpool lanes.

== Results ==
Houston mayoral election, 2007
Party	Candidate	Votes	%	±%
None	Bill White (incumbent)	101,277	87%	
None	Amanda Ulman	8,798	7%	
None	Outlaw Josey Wales	7,023	6%	

== Aftermath ==
White served his third term as mayor and as ineligible for re-election in the 2009 mayoral elections. Ulman would run again that year, but received only 1% of the vote. She ran again in 2011, receiving 1,882 votes.

== See also ==
- 2007 Houston elections
- 2009 Houston mayoral election
- Elections in Texas
