= 2007 Houston elections =

The 2007 Houston elections took place on May 12, June 16, and November 6, 2007. All City Council posts, the City Controller, and the Mayor all had elections. All positions were non-partisan.

== Mayor ==
See 2007 Houston mayoral election

== City Controller ==
The 2007 Houston City Controller election was a non disputed election with Incumbent Annise Parker being re-elected to a third term with virtually 100% of the vote.

2007 Houston City Controller election
Party	Candidate	Votes	%	±%
none	Annise Parker	86,478	100%	

== City Council At-large 1 ==
In the 2007 Houston City Council At-large 1 election, Peter Hoyt Brown was re-elected to a second term with 100% of the vote.

2007 Houston City Council At-large 1 election
Party	Candidate	Votes	%	±%
none	Peter Hoyt Brown	88,192	100%	

== City Council At-large 2 ==
In the 2007 Houston City Council At-large 2 election, Sue Lovell was re-elected to a second term against opponent Michael Griffin (Not the former administrator of NASA).

2007 Houston City Council At-large 2 election
Party	Candidate	Votes	%	±%
none	Sue Lovell	50,037	53%	
none	Michael Griffin	44,594	47%	

== City Council At-large 3 ==
2007 was a rough year for At-large 3, First in May many candidates dove into a crowded special election, the top two, Melissa Noriega and Roy Morales, then ran in the run-off in June. Noriega won but later faced Morales again in November and was again successful.

2007 Houston City Council At-large 3 special election
Party	Candidate	Votes	%	±%
none	Melissa Noriega	15,957	47%	
none	Roy Morales	6,349	19%	
none	Tom Nixon	4,545	13%	
none	David Goldberg	2,325	7%	
none	Kendall Baker	1,640	5%	
none	Sara Owen-Gemoets	979	3%	
none	Noel Freeman	872	3%	
none	Andy Neill	599	2%	
none	Anthony Dutrow	231	1%	

2007 Houston City Council At-large 3 special run-off election
Party	Candidate	Votes	%	±%
none	Melissa Noriega	13,892	56%	
none	Roy Morales	11,062	44%	

2007 Houston City Council At-large 3 election
Party	Candidate	Votes	%	±%
none	Melissa Noriega	67,744	66%	
none	Roy Morales	34,758	34%	

== City Council At-large 4 ==
In the 2007 Houston City Council At-large 4 election, Ronald Green, was re-elected to a third term. He was given 100% of the vote from the voters.

2007 Houston City Council At-large 4 election
Party	Candidate	Votes	%	±%
none	Ronald Green	84,468	100%	

== City Council At-large 5 ==
In the 2007 Houston City Council At-large 5 election, Jolanda Jones was elected to an at-large position, after a run-off.

2007 Houston City Council At-large 5 election
Party	Candidate	Votes	%	±%
none	Jolanda Jones	28,056	28%	
none	Joe Trevino	19,100	19%	
none	Tom Nixon	13,947	14%	
none	Jack Christie	13,649	13%	
none	Zaf Tahir	10,712	11%	
none	John Gibbs	7,112	7%	
none	Ray Ramirez	4,397	4%	
none	Marlon Barabin	4,055	4%	

2007 Houston City Council At-large 5 run-off election
Party	Candidate	Votes	%	±%
none	Jolanda Jones	16,212	67%	
none	Joe Trevino	8,002	33%	

== City Council District A ==
In the 2007 Houston City Council District A election, Toni Lawrence was re-elected to a third term with 100% of the vote.

2007 Houston City Council District A election
Party	Candidate	Votes	%	±%
none	Toni Lawrence	9,985	100%	

== City Council District B ==
In the 2007 Houston City Council District B election, Jarvis Johnson was re-elected to a second term.

2007 Houston City Council District B election
Party	Candidate	Votes	%	±%
none	Jarvis Johnson	8,254	77%	
none	Kenneth Perkins	2,473	33%	

== City Council District C ==
In the 2007 Houston City Council District C election, Anne Clutterbuck was re-elected to a second term.

2007 Houston City Council District C election
Party	Candidate	Votes	%	±%
none	Anne Clutterbuck	11,994	77%	
none	Robert Glaser	2,700	17%	
none	Alfred Molison	893	6%	

== City Council District D ==
In the 2007 Houston City Council District D election, Wanda Adams was elected after a run-off.

2007 Houston City Council District D election
Party	Candidate	Votes	%	±%
none	Wanda Adams	6,509	33%	
none	Lawrence Allen	5,038	26%	
none	Michael Williams	3,795	20%	
none	Lana Edwards	2,309	12%	
none	Keith Caldwell	830	4%	
none	Larry McKinzie	515	2%	
none	Flo Cooper	503	2%	

2007 Houston City Council District D run-off election
Party	Candidate	Votes	%	±%
none	Wanda Adams	4,693	57%	
none	Lawrence Allen	3,501	43%	

== City Council District E ==
In the Houston City Council District E election, Mike Sullivan was elected after a run-off.

2007 Houston City Council District E election
Party	Candidate	Votes	%	±%
none	Mike Sullivan	5,444	40%	
none	Annette Dwyer	4,639	34%	
none	Manisha Mehta	2,000	15%	
none	William Williams	1,504	11%	

2007 Houston City Council District E run-off election
Party	Candidate	Votes	%	±%
none	Mike Sullivan	3,491	54%	
none	Annette Dwyer	2,764	46%	

== City Council District F ==
In the 2007 Houston City Council District F election, M. J. Khan was elected to a third term with 100% of the vote.

2007 Houston City Council District F election
Party	Candidate	Votes	%	±%
none	M. J. Khan	4,686	100%	

== City Council District G ==
In the 2007 Houston City Council District G election, Pam Holm was elected to a third term with 100% of the vote.

2007 Houston City Council District G election
Party	Candidate	Votes	%	±%
none	Pam Hom	14,733	100%	

== City Council District H ==
In the 2007 Houston City Council District H election, Adrian Garcia was elected to a third term with 100% of the vote. He resigned one year into his term to become the Harris County Sheriff.

2007 Houston City Council District H election
Party	Candidate	Votes	%	±%
none	Adrian Garcia	7,853	100%	

== City Council District I ==
In the 2007 Houston City Council District I election, James Rodriguez was elected as a new council member.

2007 Houston City Council District I election
Party	Candidate	Votes	%	±%
none	James Rodriguez	4,523	58%	
none	John Marron	2,991	35%	
none	Brad Batteau	579	7%	
