= 2006 Texas's 22nd congressional district elections =

2006 Texas's 22nd congressional district general election
- November 7, 2006
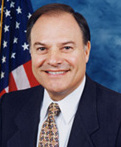

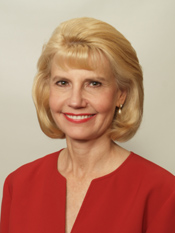

Nominee	Nick Lampson	Shelley Sekula-Gibbs (write-in)	Bob Smither
Party	Democratic	Republican	Libertarian
Popular vote	76,775	61,938	9,009
Percentage	51.79%	41.78%	6.08%
- County results Lampson: 40–50% 50–60% 60–70%
U.S. Representative before election
Tom DeLay
Republican
Elected U.S. Representative
Nick Lampson
Democratic

2006 ballot for the general election

The 2006 Texas 22nd congressional district election for the 110th Congress was held on November 7, 2006, and attracted considerable attention because this district was represented by former House Majority Leader Tom DeLay, a prominent member of the Republican Party, who resigned after being indicted and subsequently winning the Republican primary. Because of Texas state law (and court rulings interpreting it), Republicans, in order to hold on to the seat, would have had to win a write-in campaign, something that has only been done four other times in the history of U.S. congressional elections.

There were actually two elections held in the district on November 7: a special election to fill DeLay's vacant seat which expired in January 2007, and a general election which was for a two-year term starting in January 2007.

In the special election, there were five candidates—four Republicans—Shelley Sekula-Gibbs, Don Richardson, former US Representative Steve Stockman and Giannibecego Hoa Tran, and one Libertarian, Bob Smither. The Democrats were not represented with a candidate. Sekula-Gibbs won that race with approximately 63 percent of the vote and was sworn in as a Member of Congress on November 13, 2006.

In the general election there were three main candidates. Democrat and former US Representative Nick Lampson, Libertarian Party candidate Bob Smither, and Republican Sekula-Gibbs. Only Lampson's and Smither's names appeared on the ballot, as Shelley Sekula-Gibbs had to run as a write-in candidate because DeLay had previously won the Republican primary. In this race, Lampson captured 52% of the vote, to Sekula-Gibbs' 42%, and Smither collected 6%.

== Background ==
=== Tom DeLay's ethical problems ===
On September 28, 2005, DeLay was indicted on conspiracy charges by a grand jury in Travis County. As a result, he stepped down from his post as House Majority Leader.

=== 2006 primary ===
DeLay won the Republican primary on March 7, 2006, getting 62% of the vote in the four-way race. DeLay outspent his closest opponent, Tom Campbell, by a near 20–1 ratio. It was his lowest percentage of votes in a primary election and it prompted questions about whether he could win the general election.

=== Resignation and decision not to run for re-election ===
On April 3, 2006, three days after a former aide, Tony Rudy, pleaded guilty to various charges of corruption relating to the Jack Abramoff scandal, DeLay announced that he would withdraw from the race and not run for re-election. He explained that polls showed him beating Democratic opponent Nick Lampson in the general election, but that the possibility of losing the election was too risky. DeLay announced his resignation effective June 9, 2006. DeLay said that he planned to move to a condominium that he owns in Virginia near Washington, D.C. He stated that he could serve "the conservative cause" best by forming a lobbying firm that would work to support conservative issues. On May 24, 2006, DeLay's final bill, the Safe and Timely Interstate Placement of Foster Children Act of 2006, passed in the House with unanimous support. In his farewell speech on June 8 to the House, he defended the "pugnacious" political partisanship he'd championed.

=== Determination of eligibility and withdrawal of name ===
On June 12, 2006, Tom DeLay's voice was featured in a robocall that went to 11,000 homes in Northern Virginia announcing his endorsement for Republican Primary candidate Mark Ellmore. In the robocall, he mistakenly stated he lives in California which was featured in The Hill, "Recently I reregistered to vote in Northern California. My first action was to cast my vote for Mark Ellmore in tomorrow's Republican Primary." This prompted a challenge with the City of Alexandria Voter's Registrar, stating the vote was illegal since it was speculated that DeLay was still registered in Texas.

=== Placing another Republican on the ballot ===
Texas law stipulates that after a candidate wins a primary, the party may not replace him unless he is ineligible for re-election. DeLay asserted, when he resigned, that he moved to Virginia, rendering him ineligible. The Texas Republican Party chairwoman subsequently declared that DeLay was ineligible for re-election, and set about choosing a replacement candidate. Texas Democrats, however, filed a lawsuit arguing that the Republican Party could not legally name another candidate for the 2006 election because DeLay was still eligible for election.

In July 2006, a district judge ruled that DeLay was indeed still eligible, in part finding that allowing the Texas GOP to find DeLay ineligible based on his current residency would effectively impose an unconstitutional residency requirement. On August 3, 2006, a 3-member panel of the Fifth Circuit Court of Appeals unanimously upheld the decision and affirmed the District Court's constitutional argument. On August 7, the Texas Republican Party filed an application to Justice Antonin Scalia, who handles the Fifth Circuit, to stay the Court of Appeals ruling. Scalia denied the stay on the same day, ruling that DeLay's name must stay on the ballot pending an appeal. This effectively ended the efforts by the GOP to put a replacement name on ballot, as the Supreme Court could not hear and decide the case before the November election.

DeLay announced on August 8, 2006, that he would withdraw in order for the GOP to organize a campaign for a write-in candidate. The result is that no Republican was listed on the ballot for the two-year term that began in January 2007.

== Candidates in the general election ==
=== Democrat ===
On January 2, 2006, Lampson filed to challenge DeLay for the 2006 election, as a Democrat. Lampson represented an adjacent district (the Texas's 9th congressional district) until DeLay engineered the 2003 Texas redistricting; Lampson lost his seat to Ted Poe in 2004.

The 22nd had absorbed several parts of Lampson's former territory, including much of Galveston. DeLay, who was then the House Majority Leader had only managed a 14-point victory in 2004—far less than what is normally expected for a party leader in Congress. Many experts believed that the 22nd, long considered a rock-ribbed Republican district, had become much more competitive as a result of DeLay's attempts to make the other Houston-area districts more Republican. Most of the Democratic strength can be attributed to the portion of the district in Galveston County, home to large numbers of unionized petrochemical refinery workers.

Lampson announced on August 16, 2006, that three major police associations had endorsed him: the National Association of Police Organizations, the International Union of Police Associations, and the Texas State Police Coalition.

=== Libertarian ===
On March 25, 2006, Bob Smither won the nomination of the Libertarian Party to run in the 22nd District.

=== Republican write-in ===
The Texas GOP, resigned to the fact that they could not get another name on the ballot, decided to go the write-in route, scheduling a meeting of precinct chairs in the 22nd district on August 17. Before that meeting, Sugar Land mayor David Wallace, the presumed favorite before Scalia's denial of the appeal, filed as a write-in candidate with the Texas Secretary of State, vowing to run even without the support of the GOP.

At the August 17 meeting, the precinct chairs selected Houston councilwoman Shelley Sekula-Gibbs as the Republican write-in candidate. Wallace initially indicated he would remain in the race, suggesting that the endorsement of Sekula-Gibbs was unrepresentative of the district's "grass roots". But with national Republicans insisting that the only way they would fund the race—they were pledging $3 million—was if the GOP field was limited to one write-in candidate, Wallace withdrew in late August. Part of the decision to bypass Wallace may have been based on his decision to run against the incumbent Republican mayor of Sugar Land in 2002, a race that he won.

== Non-candidates ==
=== Independent ===
Former US Representative Steve Stockman, who had previously represented the 9th district, attempted to run as an independent, but failed to gather enough signatures to make the ballot.

== Fundraising and campaign expenditures ==
At the end of June 2006, Lampson had $2.2 million cash on hand and spent about $744,000. His campaign spokesman said Lampson should have more than $3 million in contributions and the campaign plans to use every bit of it. "It's not in our plans to have any money left over," Mike Malaise said. By contrast, Sekula-Gibbs had about $30,000 in the bank at the end of June, two months after she began raising money.

Texas GOP chairwoman Tina Benkiser told a group of the district's precinct chairs that the national Republican party would spend $3 million to $4 million in the race if only one Republican ran as a write-in, said Gretchen Essell, party spokeswoman. While Wallace did drop out, another Republican, Don Richardson, filed as a write-in candidate.

Eric Thode, former GOP chairman in Fort Bend County, which includes DeLay's hometown of Sugar Land, doesn't expect much outside money to be spent on the race. "Neither Republicans or Democrats are going to waste — emphasis on waste — three to four million on a nearly impossible write-in bid when you've got 20 or 30 close congressional races where the dynamics are near normal around the nation," he said.

== Outlook and polls ==
During the fall, this election was rated as among the more competitive in the country according to the National Journal. Two non-partisan political reports, the Cook Political Report and Larry Sabato's Crystal Ball, rated the race as Leans Democratic.

On August 16, 2006, the Hotline ranked Texas' 22nd Congressional District House race as 8th, from a previous ranking of 14th, in a list of the top 30 House races in the country. In late August CQPolitics.com changed their rating of the race from "No Clear Favorite" to Leans Democratic.

On October 30, 2006, a Zogby poll showed a statistical tie. Sekula-Gibbs received 28 percent, Lampson 36 percent and Smither 4 percent, based upon 500 respondents.

=== Polling ===
Source	Date	Lampson (D)	Sekula-Gibbs (R)	Smither (L)
Houston Chronicle/KHOU	October 30, 2006	36%	28%	4%

=== General election results ===
2006 U.S. House election: Texas district 22
Party	Candidate	Votes	%
Democratic	Nick Lampson	76,775	51.79%
Republican	Shelley Sekula-Gibbs (write-in)	61,938	41.78%
Libertarian	Bob Smither	9,009	6.08%
Write-In	Don Richardson	428	0.29%
Write-In	Joe Reasbeck	89	0.06%
Majority		14,841	8.01%
Turnout		148,239	
Democratic gain from Republican			

== Special election ==
=== Background ===
Texas Governor Rick Perry announced on August 29, 2006, that a special election would take place for the unexpired term of DeLay (November–December 2006), coinciding with the general election on November 7, 2006. This meant that voters would vote twice on that date, once for the special election, once for the general election—and it also meant that Sekula-Gibbs' name would be on a ballot for November 7.

On August 29, both Sekula-Gibbs and Nick Lampson said they would file for the special election. On August 31, Lampson decided not to file. "We want to be able to say, vote once for Lampson and then you're done," his campaign manager said. Lampson also said that his not running might eliminate the cost and confusion of a run-off, since no candidate might win the required majority in the special election. Sekula-Gibbs was asked if the special election would confuse voters. She replied, "People already know it's an unusual race." She also stated that having her name on one ballot would serve as "a memory jog."

In addition to Sekula-Gibbs, four others filed for the special election before the September 1 deadline: Republicans Sekula-Gibbs, Don Richardson, former Rep. Steve Stockman, and Giannibecego Hoa Tran along with Libertarian Bob Smither.

=== Results ===
Official results for the November 7 special election
Party	Candidate	Votes	%
Republican	Shelley Sekula-Gibbs	76,924	62.07%
Libertarian	Bob Smither	23,425	18.90%
Republican	Steve Stockman	13,600	10.97%
Republican	Don Richardson	7,405	5.98%
Republican	Giannibicego Hoa Tran	2,568	2.07%
Total votes		123,922	100%

In the special election Sekula-Gibbs won with 62% of the vote, and served the remaining 2 months of DeLays term In the general election for the full two-year term Lampson defeated Sekula-Gibbs 52% to 42%, and was sworn back into Congress on January 3rd 2007. In 2008, Sekula-Gibbs ran for the seat again, running in a crowded Republican primary field. While she received the most votes on primary day, she was defeated by a wide margin by Pete Olson, the former Chief of Staff to U.S. Senator John Cornyn and a veteran of the United States Navy. Olson went on to defeat Lampson in the general election.

== See also ==
- Special elections to the United States House of Representatives
