= 2011 Houston mayoral election =

- November 8, 2011
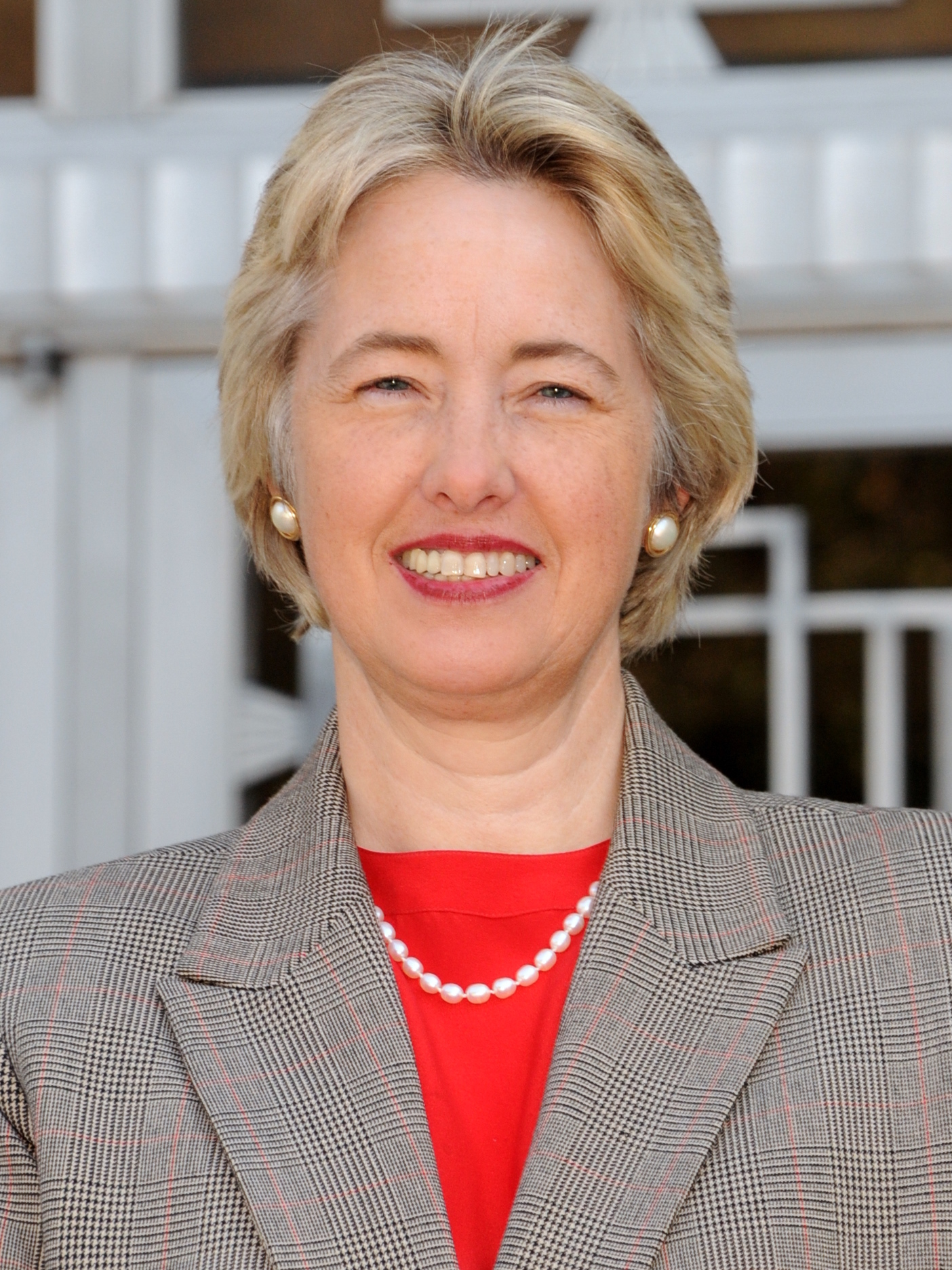

Candidate	Annise Parker	Jack O'Connor	Fernando Herrera
Popular vote	59,156	17,237	16,712
Percentage	50.83%	14.81%	14.36%
Candidate	Dave Wilson	Kevin Simms	Amanda Ulman
Popular vote	13,648	7,797	1,835
Percentage	11.73%	6.70%	1.58%
Mayor before election
Annise Parker
Elected mayor
Annise Parker

The 2011 Houston mayoral election took place on November 8, 2011.

Incumbent Mayor Annise Parker ran for a second two-year term in office and was re-elected. There were four other declared candidates: Longtime Houstonian Jack O'Connor, a manufacturing businessman; Houston Deputy Fire Chief Fernando Herrera; Kevin Simms, a former volunteer intern in Councilman Jarvis Johnson's office; and local businessman Dave Wilson.

== Results ==
Houston mayoral election results, 2011
Candidate		Votes	%	±
✓	Annise Parker (Inc.)	59,156	50.83%	
	Jack O'Connor	17,237	14.81%	
	Fernando Herrera	16,712	14.36%	
	Dave Wilson	13,648	11.73%	
	Kevin Simms	7,797	6.70%	
	Amanda Ulman	1,835	1.58%	
Turnout		116,385		

== See also ==
- Politics of Houston
- Houston City Council
