= Charlene Ward Johnson =

Texas politician

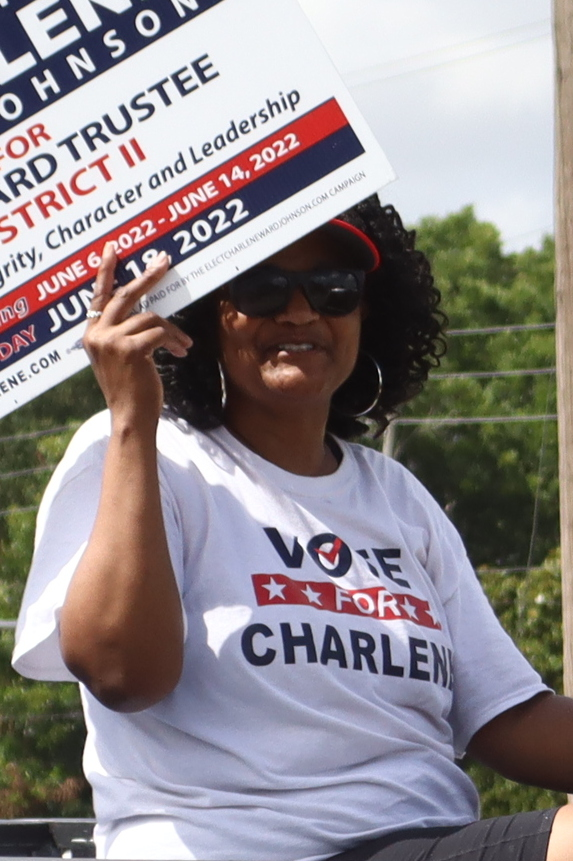

Member of the Texas House of Representatives from the 139th district
- Incumbent
- Assumed office January 14, 2025
- Preceded by: Jarvis Johnson

Personal details
- Born: Temple, Texas
- Party: Democratic
- Spouse: Jarvis Johnson (divorced)
- Children: 2
- Education: University of Houston(B.A.); University of Arizona Global Campus(Master's)
- Website: Campaign website

Charlene Ward Johnson is an American politician serving as a member of the Texas House of Representatives for the 139th district since 2025. A Democrat, she previously served as a Houston Community College Trustee.

== Early life and education ==
Ward Johnson was born in Temple, Texas. She graduated from the University of Houston in 1991 with a bachelor of science degree in technology, where she was a member of Alpha Kappa Alpha. In 2021, she received a Masters degree from the University of Arizona Global Campus in organizational management with a specialization in public administration.

== Personal life ==
Ward Johnson is a mother of two.
