= James A. Thompson (Texas politician) =

American politician

Mayor of Sugar Land
- In office 2008-?
- Preceded by: David G. Wallace

Sugar Land City Council Member
- In office 1996-2005

Personal details
- Spouse: Gay Thompson (m. 1970)
- Children: 3
- Education: Stephen F. Austin State University

James A. Thompson is an American politician from the state of Texas. He is the former mayor of Sugar Land, Texas.

== Personal life ==
James Thompson attended Bellaire High School in Houston. He graduated from Stephen F. Austin State University in Nacogdoches, Texas. He has served on the Board of Regents there since 2005.

He married his wife, Gay, in 1970. They have three children: Michael, Tara, and Meredith. He has lived in Sugar Land with his family since 1978.

== Political career ==
Thompson was a board member of Fort Bend Municipal Utility District #12. He then served 15 years on the Fort Bend County Commissioner's Court to Fort Bend Levee Improvement District #2. Thompson served nine years on the Sugar Land City Council, from 1996 to 2005, both as a District and At-Large council member.

During his political career, Thompson was assisted in projects for the expansion of Highway 59, improving local roads in Sugar Land, the creation of the Sugar Land Town Square, improving the Sugar Land Regional Airport; expanding the Sugar Land park system (creating the Imperial, Oyster Creek, and Eldridge parks), and acquiring land for the Brazos River Corridor.

Thompson was elected mayor of Sugar Land in 2008 after former mayor David G. Wallace stepped down from his office. The election was held on the June 21, 2008. 7,852 people voted in the election and Thompson won with a margin of over 1600.
