= Sarah Davis (politician) =

American politician (born 1976)

Member of the Texas House of Representatives from the 134th district
- In office January 11, 2011 – January 12, 2021
- Preceded by: Ellen Cohen
- Succeeded by: Ann Johnson

Personal details
- Born: May 18, 1976 (age 50) Charleston, West Virginia, US
- Party: Republican
- Spouse: Kent Adams
- Education: Baylor University (BA); University of Houston (JD)
- Occupation: Attorney/Of Counsel, Wilson Elser Moskowitz Edelman & Dicker

Sarah Davis (born May 18, 1976) is an American politician who served as a Republican member of the Texas House of Representatives; she was first elected in the Tea Party wave of 2010. Her district, the 134th, is located in Houston and includes The Galleria, Rice University, and the Texas Medical Center. Prior to her loss to Ann Johnson in 2020, Davis was the only pro-choice Republican in the Texas House.

Davis won election to her fifth term in the House in the general election held on November 6, 2018, when she defeated Democrat Allison Lami Sawyer, 47,164 votes (53.2 percent) to 41,486 (46.8 percent). In 2018, she ran 1,028 votes behind her showing two years earlier.

== Political views ==
Davis has served on multiple committees and is a former chairman of the House Ethics Committee. In her fourth-term election 2016, Davis polled 48,192 votes (53.6 percent) to defeat Democrat Ben Rose, who drew 38,958 (43.3 percent). Libertarian Gilberto "Gil" Velasquez Jr. received the remaining 2,831 votes (3.2 percent).

=== LGBT policy ===
Equality Texas gave Davis an "A+" on her scorecard for the 86th session, stating that she "was the only Republican in the legislature to co-author pro-equality bills — five in all. She also stood in solidarity with the House LGBTQ Caucus on the House floor and at public events."

In the 2018 election cycle, the Human Rights Campaign endorsed her. She was the only Republican to receive their endorsement.

In the 82nd legislature, Davis received an "F" from Equality Texas for supporting Republican Wayne Christian's attempts to end LGBT resource centers on college campuses during a legislative session marked by major reductions in funding across the board due to the depressed state economy. In the 83rd legislature, Davis received a "C" from Equality Texas. When asked about performing same-sex wedding ceremonies, Davis said "I believe marriage is a religious sacrament, and the government should not force congregations to perform the ceremonies, However I do not oppose two consenting adults entering into civil unions." In 2014, Equality Texas endorsed Davis while Davis was being challenged by another Republican, Bonnie Parker.

=== Guns ===
In 2015, Davis voted in favor of HB972, allowing guns on college campuses. This law also allowed guns to be brought into the buildings and dorms of universities in Texas. In 2013, Davis voted in favor of HB1076, prohibiting the enforcement of federal firearm regulations concerning firearm capacity, registration, or background checks. The bill did not become law.

Davis has received the endorsement of the NRA Political Victory Fund (NRA-PVF) and the Texas State Rifle Association. Davis authored a bill to reduce license fees for concealed carry licenses issued to retired military and law enforcement personnel. In 2010, the NRA and Texas State Rifle Association both gave her an "A" on her position on gun rights. She received an "A" grade and endorsement from the NRA-PVF in 2014, but this fell to a "C" grade in 2020.

Davis voted in favor of reducing the penalty for carrying a gun in a prohibited location, including a high school, college sporting event, a church, or a hospital. The penalty was reduced from a Class A misdemeanor to a Class C misdemeanor.

=== Education ===
The 2011 state budget, voted for by Davis, cut $5.4 billion from public schools. The budget resulted in the elimination of 10,000 teaching positions and widespread cuts to pre-kindergarten programs. In 2012, Davis claimed her vote on the budget did not reduce funding for public education. PolitiFact rated Davis' claim "Pants on Fire."

In 2015, Davis opposed limiting pre-kindergarten class sizes to 18 and opposed ensuring that teachers met certain qualifications. In that same session, Davis voted to table Amendment 4 on HB1 - meaning that the public education budget would be cut by $800,000,000.

=== Crime ===
Davis authored and passed a bill which strengthened the ability of prosecutors to pursue child pornography cases.

=== Health care ===
Davis is the only pro-choice Republican in the Texas legislature and has earned the endorsement of Planned Parenthood in previous races. In 2011, Davis voted against a bill to require physicians to conduct intra-vaginal sonograms, prior to even pharmaceutically induced abortions, citing her opposition to legislative interference in the doctor-patient relationship. Davis likened this legislation to the government takeover of the doctor-patient relationship by ObamaCare, and as a Republican who believes in limited government, personal freedom and individual responsibility, Davis said the government should not practice medicine. Davis voted for a bill that prohibits the state from funding facilities that perform abortions. In 2013, she voted against a bill that increases abortion facility requirements, regulates the administration of abortion inducing drugs, and prohibits abortions after 20 weeks of gestation. Davis stated at the time that the bill constituted a de facto ban on abortions and would not withstand constitutional scrutiny. During the 2013 debate on the abortion restriction bill, Davis offered an amendment to the abortion bill which retained the 20-week ban, but which deleted the unconstitutional facility restrictions, and instead incorporated exceptions for cases of rape, incest, danger to the mother's life and severe fetal abnormalities. The facility restrictions in the bill were found to be unconstitutional by the Supreme Court in Whole Woman's Health v. Hellerstedt.

=== Other ===
Davis has been named a "Fighter for Free Enterprise" by the Texas Association of Business. She voted to permanently exempt small businesses from paying the state margins tax. Davis voted to require drug screening of those seeking unemployment benefits. She voted to require photo identification to vote, voted to end sanctuary cities and she voted to fund increased border security.

=== Gubernatorial dispute ===
After Davis clashed with Governor Greg Abbott in the 2017 summer special session, Governor Abbott gave his first endorsement of the 2018 election cycle to her primary opponent Susanna Dokupil. Abbott has been an active and vocal opponent of Davis' campaign, even saying that Davis "completely disregards her very own constituents and puts her own personal, petty politics ahead of the greater good for the people of the state of Texas."

== Committee assignments ==
- Appropriations
  - Subcommittee on Article II (Chair)
- Calendars
- Corrections
- Economic Competitiveness, Select
- General Investigating & Ethics (Chair)

== Personal life ==
Davis is a breast cancer survivor, and is married to Kent Adams.

== Electoral history ==
=== Texas state house elections ===
==== 2010 ====
Texas primary election, 2010: House District 134
Party	Candidate	Votes	%	±%
Republican	Sarah Davis	4,379	54.55%	
Republican	Bonnie Parker	3,648	45.45%	
Majority		731	9.1%	−36.43%
Turnout		8027	100%	+2.74%

Texas general election, 2010: House District 134
Party	Candidate	Votes	%	±%
Republican	Sarah Davis	25,955	50.68%	+8.47%
Democratic	Ellen Cohen (incumbent)	25,254	49.31%	−6.15%
Majority		701	1.36%	−9.56%
Turnout		51,209	100%	−25.04%
Republican gain from Democratic		Swing	+8.47%	

==== 2012 ====
Texas primary election, 2012: House District 134
Party	Candidate	Votes	%	±%
Republican	Sarah Davis (incumbent)	9,796	100%	+55.29%
Majority		9,796	100%	+90.9%
Turnout		9,796	100%	+18.08%

Texas general election, 2012: House District 134
Party	Candidate	Votes	%	±%
Republican	Sarah Davis (incumbent)	43,823	54.64%	+3.96%
Democratic	Ann Johnson	36,366	45.35%	−3.96%
Majority		7457	9.29%	+7.93%
Turnout		80,189	100%	+56.59%
Republican hold		Swing	+3.96%	

==== 2014 ====
Texas primary election, 2014: House District 134
Party	Candidate	Votes	%	±%
Republican	Sarah Davis (incumbent)	8,050	70.95%	+16.4%
Republican	Bonnie Parker	3,296	29.04%	−16.41%
Majority		4,754	41.9%	−49%
Turnout		11,346	100%	+13.66%

Texas general election, 2014: House District 134
Party	Candidate	Votes	%	±%
Republican	Sarah Davis (incumbent)	32,092	61.18%	+6.54%
Democratic	Alison Ruff	20,364	38.82%	−6.54%
Majority		11,728	22.36%	+13.07%
Turnout		52,456	100%	−34.59%
Republican hold		Swing	+6.54%	

==== 2016 ====
Texas primary election, 2016: House District 134
Party	Candidate	Votes	%	±%
Republican	Sarah Davis (incumbent)	13,858	59.48%	−11.47%
Republican	David L. Palmer	9,439	40.52%	+11.47%
Majority		4,419	18.96%	−22.94%
Turnout		23,297		

Texas general election, 2016: House District 134
Party	Candidate	Votes	%	±%
Republican	Sarah Davis (incumbent)	48,192	53.56%	−7.62%
Democratic	Ben Rose	38,958	43.30%	+4.48%
Libertarian	Gilberto "Gil" Velasquez, Jr.	2,831	3.15%	+3.15%
Majority		9,234	10.26%	−12.10%
Turnout		89,981	100%	+71.54%
Republican hold		Swing	-7.62%	

==== 2018 ====
Texas primary election, 2018: House District 134
Party	Candidate	Votes	%	±%
Republican	Sarah Davis (incumbent)	8,081	56.31%	−3.17%
Republican	Susanna Dokupil	6,269	43.69%	+3.17%
Majority		1,812	12.62%	−6.34%
Turnout		14,350		

Texas general election, 2018: House District 134
Party	Candidate	Votes	%	±%
Republican	Sarah Davis (incumbent)	47,277	53.17%	−0.39%
Democratic	Allison Lami Sawyer	41,637	46.83%	+3.53%
Majority		5,640	6.34%	−3.92%
Turnout		88,914	100%	−1.19%
Republican hold		Swing	-0.39%	

==== 2020 ====
Texas general election, 2020: House District 134
Party	Candidate	Votes	%	±%
Democratic	Ann Johnson	56,895	52.3%	5.47%
Republican	Sarah Davis (incumbent)	51,960	47.7%	−5.47%
Majority		4,935	4.6%	−1.74%
Turnout		108,855	100%	+22.4%
Democratic gain from Republican		Swing	+10.94%	
