= 2005 Houston mayoral election =

- November 8, 2005
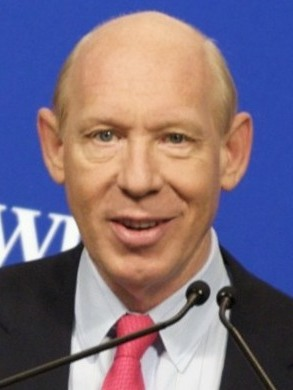
Candidate	Bill White
Popular vote	168,331
Percentage	91%
Mayor before election
Bill White
Elected mayor
Bill White

The Houston Mayoral Election of 2005 took place on November 8, 2005. Incumbent Mayor Bill White was re-elected to a second term. Officially the race was non-partisan. Houston was dealing with the lingering impact of Hurricane Katrina and the large number of displaced Louisiana residents.

== Candidates ==
- Incumbent Mayor Bill White
- Gladys House
- Jack Terence
- Luis Ullrich
- Anthony Dutrow

== Results ==
Houston mayoral election, 2005
Party	Candidate	Votes	%	±%
None	Bill White (incumbent)	168,331	91%	
None	Galdys House	7,941	4%	
None	Jack Terence	4,319	3%	
None	Luis Ullrich	2,579	1%	
None	Anthony Dutrow	1,797	1%	

== See also ==
- 2009 Houston mayoral election
- Elections in Texas
