= Jerry Davis (politician) =

American politician

Member of Houston City Council for District B
- In office 2012 – December 21, 2020
- Preceded by: Jarvis Johnson
- Succeeded by: Tarsha Jackson

Personal details
- Born: Jerry V. Davis; July 31, 1973 (age 53)
- Party: Democratic
- Spouse: Rachel Andress
- Children: 3
- Education: Washington College (BA); University of St. Thomas; Prairie View A&M; University (M.ED)
- Occupation: Politician; Business owner

Jerry V. Davis is a Texas politician that represented Houston City Council District B from 2012 to 2020. He also ran for the Texas House of Representatives in 2020, but was defeated in the primary.

== Personal life ==
In 1995, Davis graduated from Washington College with a BA and later earned his teaching certificate from the University of St. Thomas. He then worked for Houston area schools as a coach. While working as a coach, he attended Prairie View A&M University and earned a Masters in Education Administration. Additionally, with his older brothers, Davis owns 3 restaurants, the Breakfast Klub, the Reggae Hut, and the Alley Kat Bar & Lounge. He is married to Rachel Andress and has 3 children, Dean, Rylie and, Ryan.

== Political career ==
Davis is affiliated with the Democratic Party.

=== Houston City Council ===
He assumed office to represent District B of the Houston City Council in 2012. While on the council, he was co-sponsor of the Council District Service Fund (CDSF), which allows district council members to fund local projects in the districts they represent. He was a strong supporter of the 2012 Parks bond, which increased the cities funding into public parks. Additionally, he was appointed by his fellow council members to be mayor pro-tempore and has served the position for 2 terms. Davis was term limited on the council, in spite of this until District B held an election for a new representative Davis held the position. On December 21, 2020, Davis was succeeded by Tarsha Jackson.

=== Texas House of Representatives ===
In December 2019, Davis filed as a Democrat to run for district 142 of the Texas House of Representatives challenging incumbent Harold Dutton Jr. He was runner-up to Dutton Jr. in the Democratic primary.
