= Anne Clutterbuck =

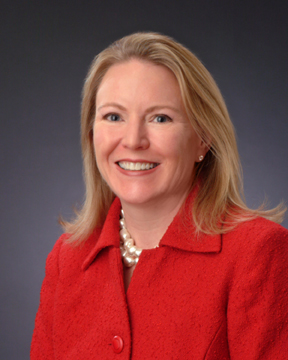

Member of the Houston City Council, representing District C
- In office January 2006 – December 2011
- Preceded by: Mark Goldberg
- Succeeded by: Ellen Cohen

Personal details
- Born: April 28
- Spouse: John Clutterbuck
- Education: Baylor University; University of Houston Law Center
- Occupation: Businesswoman attorney-at-law former city council member

Anne Clutterbuck is an attorney and former elected official living in Houston, Texas. She is a member of the board of managers of the Harris County Hospital District (also known as the Harris Health System), the governing body that oversees the public health system in the Harris County, Texas region.

Clutterbuck was elected to three terms on Houston City Council, where she served from January 2006 through 2011, when she was term limited. While on city council, she served as chair of the Budget & Fiscal Affairs Committee and as mayor pro tempore. She also represented the City of Houston as a director of the Houston-Galveston Area Council (H-GAC), where she was the vice chair of the Budget Committee and the Legislative Affairs Committee and chair of the Audit Committee.

Clutterbuck served as the president of the Southampton Civic Club for two years in 2004-5.

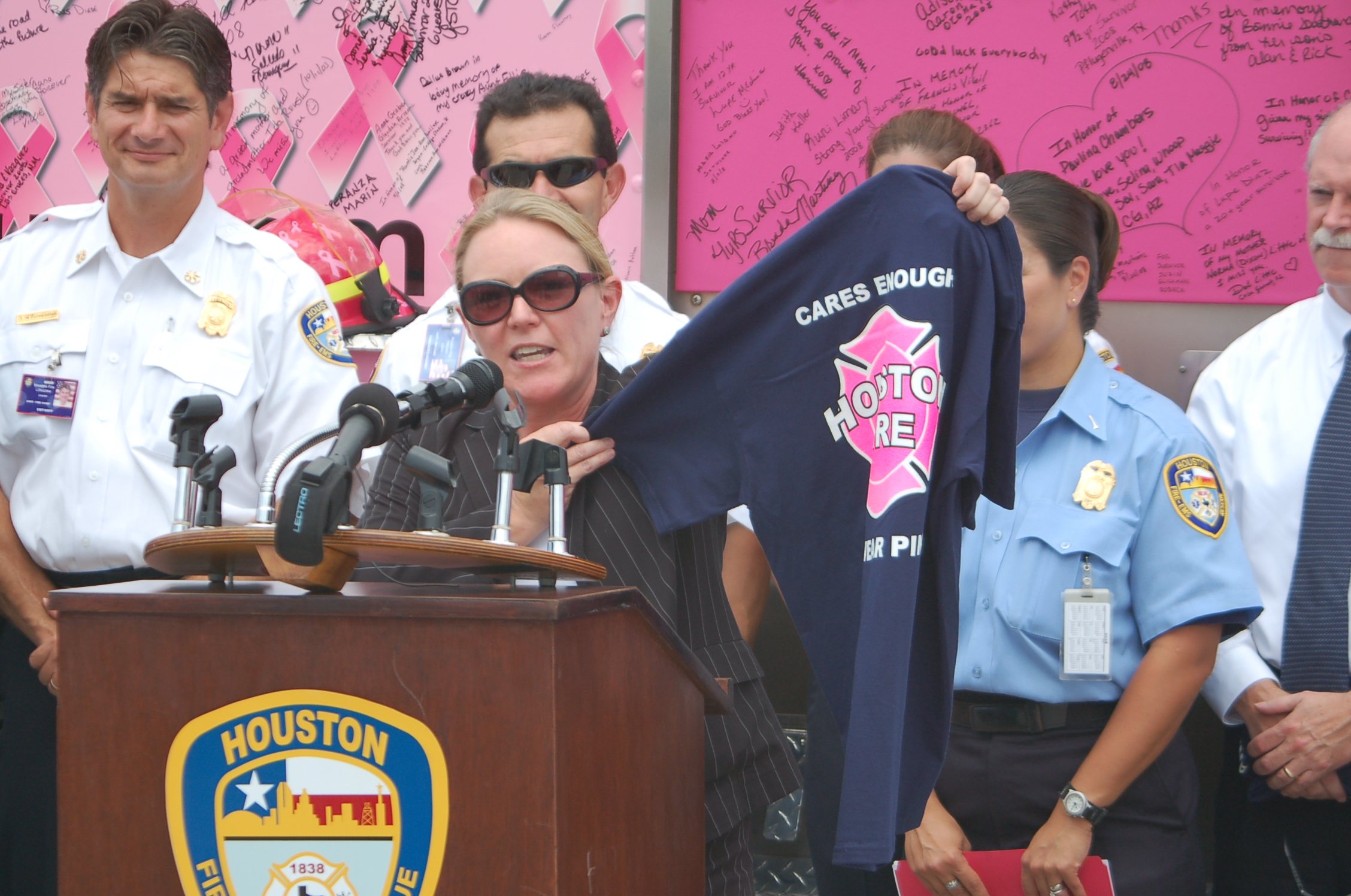
Clutterbuck speaks at the Houston Fire Department Breast Cancer Rally.

== Electoral history ==
=== 2005 ===
Houston City Council District C Election 2005
Candidate		Votes	%	±
	Judy Siverson	1,543	6.24%	
	Mark Lee	4,553	18.40%	
✓	George Hittner	4,912	19.86%	
✓	Anne Clutterbuck	4,954	20.03%	
	Brian Cweren	3,509	14.18%	
	Herman Litt	4,317	17.45%	
	Ray Jones	950	3.84%	

Houston City Council District C Election 2005, Runoff
Candidate		Votes	%	±
✓	Anne Clutterbuck	6,144	58.45%	
	George Hittner	4,368	41.55%	

=== 2007 ===
Houston City Council District C Election 2007
Candidate		Votes	%	±
	Alfred Molison	893	5.73%	
	Robert Glaser	2,700	17.32%	
✓	Anne Clutterbuck	11,994	76.95%	

=== 2009 ===
Houston City Council District C Election 2009
Candidate		Votes	%	±
✓	Anne Clutterbuck	17,660	81.78%	
	Randy Locke	3,778	17.50%	
	Alfred Molison (Write-in)	156	0.72%	
