= Texas's 139th House of Representatives district =

American legislative district

Texas's 139th State House of Representatives district
Representative
Charlene Ward Johnson; D–Houston
- Demographics: 13.4% White; 37.0% Black; 43.9% Hispanic; 5.9% Asian
- Population (2020) • Voting age: 202,150; 148,506

The 139th district of the Texas House of Representatives contains parts of northwestern Houston. The current representative is Charlene Ward Johnson, who was first elected in 2024.
