= Shelley Sekula-Gibbs =

American politician (born 1953)

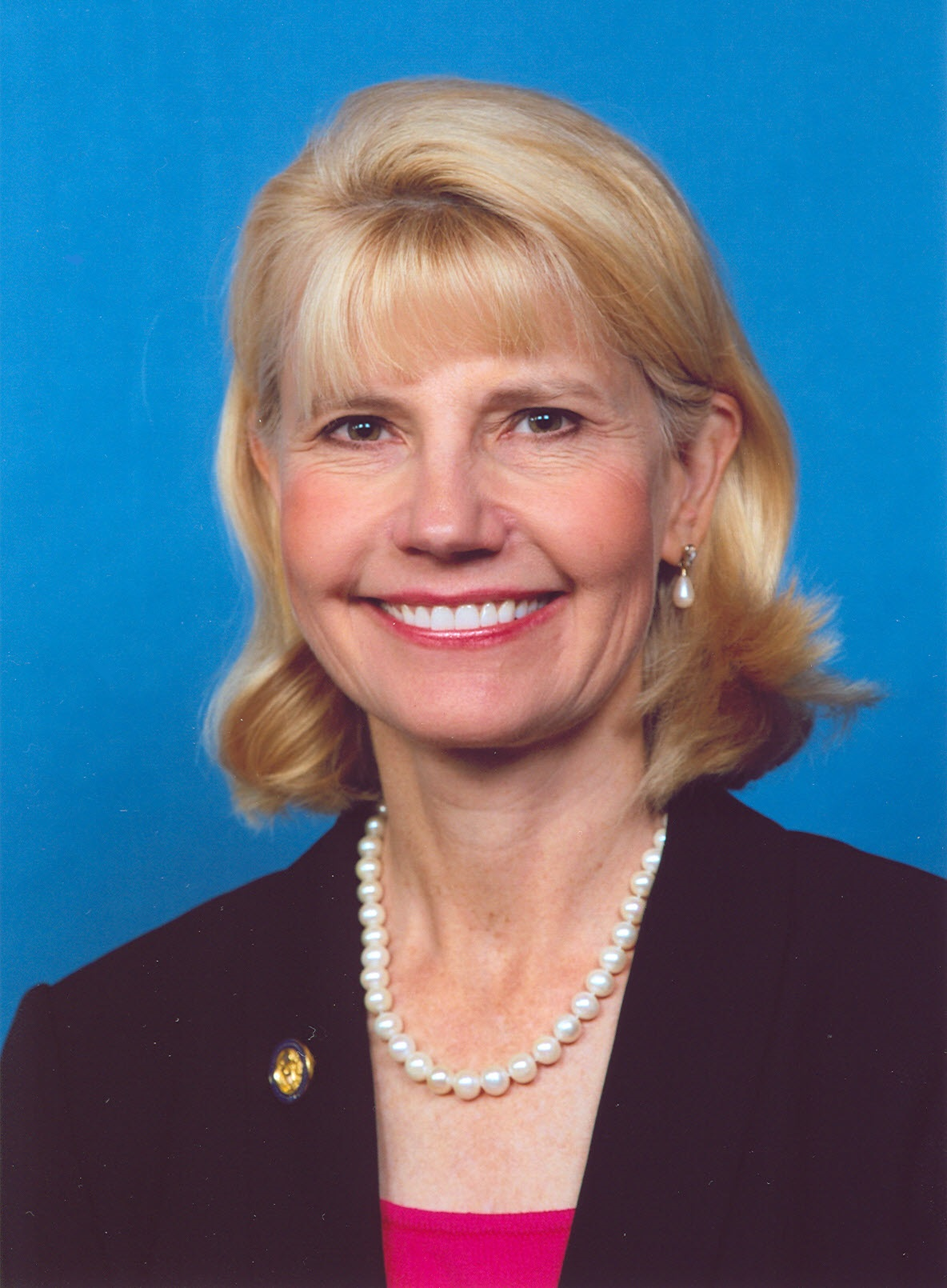

Member of the U.S. House of Representatives from Texas's 22nd district
- In office November 13, 2006 – January 3, 2007 (Note: Sekula-Gibbs's official service begins on the date of the special election, while she was not sworn in until November 13, 2006.)
- Preceded by: Tom DeLay
- Succeeded by: Nick Lampson

Member of the Houston City Council from the at-large district Seat 3
- In office January 2, 2002 – November 8, 2006
- Preceded by: Orlando Sanchez
- Succeeded by: Melissa Noriega

Personal details
- Born: Shelley Ann Sekula; June 22, 1953 (age 73) Floresville, Texas, U.S.
- Party: Republican
- Spouse: Robert Gibbs
- Education: Our Lady of the Lake University (BS); University of Texas, Galveston (MD)

Shelley Ann Sekula-Gibbs (born June 22, 1953) is an American physician and politician, who serves as a director of The Woodlands, Texas Township board of directors. She served as a member of the United States House of Representatives, representing Texas's 22nd congressional district in 2006. A Republican, she won the special election to fill the seat for the last few weeks of the 109th United States Congress. Dr. Sekula-Gibbs has the distinction of being the first dermatologist and female physician to serve in the U.S. House of Representatives. She previously served as a city councilwoman in Houston, Texas from 2002 to 2006.

== Early life and career ==
Sekula-Gibbs was born to parents of Czech, German and Polish ancestry. Sekula-Gibbs graduated from Our Lady of the Lake University in San Antonio, Texas with summa cum laude honors and a degree in chemistry. She later earned her Doctor of Medicine degree from the University of Texas Medical Branch in Galveston, Texas, and went on to residencies at the University of Florida in family practice, and Baylor College of Medicine in Houston, specializing in dermatology.

Sekula-Gibbs operated her own dermatology practice in the Clear Lake area of Houston. After selling her practice in 2015, she returned to practicing dermatology in November 2023. Sekula-Gibbs taught at Ben Taub Hospital and served as a clinical assistant professor at Baylor College of Medicine, both in the Texas Medical Center.

Sekula-Gibbs served on the Greater Houston Partnership as a member of the Health Care Advisory Committee and as a member of the Houston Galveston Area Council Emergency/Trauma Care Policy Council. She was also a part of the Friends of the Texas Medical Center Library, where she served on the board of directors.

== Political career ==
=== Houston City Council ===
Sekula-Gibbs won election to the At Large, Position Three on Houston City Council in 2001 as Shelley Sekula-Rodriguez, from her marriage to the late TV newscaster Sylvan Rodriguez. In 2005 she was re-elected under her present name. Sekula-Gibbs is the first physician to have ever been elected to serve on Houston City Council.

As a member of Houston City Council, Sekula-Gibbs served on the Quality of Life, Budget and Fiscal Affairs, Pension Review, Council Governance, Environment and Public Health, Ethics, and International Liaison and Protocol committees.

Sekula-Gibbs resigned her seat on the Houston city council on November 8, 2006, following her victory in the special election to fill the two-month unexpired term of Tom DeLay. A special election was held to fill her Council seat in May 2007; in runoff voting Democrat Melissa Noriega won the position.

=== 2006 Congressional Race ===
House Majority Leader Tom DeLay, who had represented Sekula-Gibbs's area of residence since it was redistricted into DeLay's district (see 2003 Texas redistricting) and was under indictment for conspiracy charges ─ of which he was acquitted in 2013, affirmed by the Texas Court of Criminal Appeals on October 1, 2014 ─ decided to retire from Congress instead of face a tough re-election campaign in the following November. After DeLay's announcement, Sekula-Gibbs expressed interest in the position, but waited for DeLay to complete the official withdrawal procedure before filing her papers.

On August 17, 2006, Sekula-Gibbs was selected as the endorsed Republican write-in candidate for District 22. A write-in candidate was necessary because the Republicans were unsuccessful in their efforts to replace DeLay's name on the ballot with another Republican's name. The courts ruled that replacing DeLay's name, especially after winning the state primary, violated Texas election laws. After the court defeat, DeLay chose to remove his name voluntarily from the ballot, essentially leaving the ballot without a Republican standard bearer. The precinct chairpersons voted to endorse one Republican for a write-in campaign. Four Republicans in all — Sekula-Gibbs, Tom Campbell, Tim Turner and David Wallace, the mayor of the Houston suburb of Sugar Land — expressed interest in the Republican endorsement of a write-in campaign. Two of Sekula-Gibbs' fellow Republican candidates, Campbell and Turner, decided to support Sekula-Gibbs in the general election immediately after her endorsement. However, Wallace, who was the first to launch a write-in campaign for the seat, decided initially to continue his campaign without the backing of GOP leaders in the district, which would have made election to Congress difficult for Sekula-Gibbs. In the end, Wallace dropped out of the race days after Sekula-Gibbs received the endorsement. Sekula-Gibbs faced Democratic ex-congressman Nick Lampson and Libertarian Bob Smither.

The district is heavily Republican in both the eastern portion of the district (where Sekula-Gibbs' base is located) and in the western portion (where Wallace comes from). The main counties in the district, Fort Bend, Galveston and Brazoria voted 61% for Bush and 38.5% for Kerry and the remainder to a third-party candidate. The district as a whole, including the sections of Harris that it covers, voted for Bush in 2004 with 64% of the vote. However, write-in candidates have historically failed to win in Texas, which made victory a challenge for Sekula-Gibbs. The Dallas Morning News noted that on the electronic machines used in District 22, voters would have to spell out any write-in candidate's name by using a wheel to move a cursor through the alphabet. The race was one of the most competitive races in the country according to the National Journal. Two nonpartisan political reports, the Cook Political Report and Larry Sabato's Crystal Ball, rated the race as Leans Democratic and CQPolitics.com rated the race Leans Democratic. Smither, the Libertarian candidate, has stated that "a vote for liberal Democrat Nick Lampson will be a vote for Nancy Pelosi as speaker of the House." Libertarian Ron Paul, 1988 Libertarian Party candidate for president, was a previous holder of the District 22 seat.

On October 30, 2006, a poll was released that was conducted by John Zogby and sponsored by the Houston Chronicle and KHOU, intended to gauge support for the various candidates in the district race. Sekula-Gibbs received support of 28 percent of respondents, compared to 36 percent support for Lampson, according to the poll of more than 500 likely voters in the 22nd Congressional District.

On November 7, 2006, Sekula-Gibbs lost the general election for the seat to Democrat Nick Lampson, but won the special election to fulfill the remainder of former Representative Tom DeLay's term in the final session of the 109th Congress.

=== Special election ===
Texas governor Rick Perry announced on August 29, 2006, that a special election would take place for the unexpired term of Tom DeLay, coinciding with the general election on November 7, 2006. That meant that voters chose twice for the same race but with a different set of candidates (only Libertarian Bob Smither was on both ballots). It set up a scenario in which the constituents of District 22 sent one person to Washington for the last two months of the 109th Congress and a different person to Congress for the two years following. It also means that Sekula-Gibbs was on the ballot for the special election (but not the general election, in which she remained a write-in). Sekula-Gibbs filed for the special election and appeared on the ballot, as did Bob Smither; however, Lampson chose not to file. Sekula-Gibbs was asked if the special election would confuse voters. She replied, "People already know it's an unusual race." She also stated that having her name on one ballot would serve as "a memory jog."

Sekula-Gibbs won the special election on November 7, 2006 and was sworn-in for the vacant seat on November 13. She said she would use her brief time in Congress, "For tax cuts. For immigration reform. To make sure we have a good solution for the war in Iraq." Her term expired on January 3, 2007, when Nick Lampson was sworn in to represent the district.

=== 2008 congressional race ===
Sekula-Gibbs ran again for the congressional seat in 2008. She won the first round with 29.72%--short of the majority needed to win the nomination outright. She advanced to a runoff in April against runner-up Pete Olson, a former aide to former U.S. senator Phil Gramm and chief of staff to Gramm's successor, U.S. senator and former Texas attorney general John Cornyn. Sekula-Gibbs criticized Olson as "a Washington insider ... [who] moved here just six months ago to run." Nevertheless, 12 of Texas's 19 Republican congressmen endorsed Olson in the primary. Gibbs' campaign manager in the 2008 primary was conservative activist Clymer Wright, father of the municipal term limits movement in Houston.

Olson won the April 8 runoff, taking 69 percent of the vote to Sekula-Gibbs' 31 percent. On November 4, 2008, Olson defeated Lampson with 52% of the vote to Lampson's 45%. Lampson carried the Galveston County portion of the district, but could not overcome a 15,900-vote deficit in favor of Olson in Harris County.

=== The Woodlands Township Board Elections ===
In July 2019, Sekula-Gibbs filed to run for The Woodlands Township Board of Directors, Position 5, succeeding John McMullan. She faced Walter C. Cooke, an attorney, and Rashmi Gupta. She said that her focus, as a director, was going to be "flood mitigation, incorporation, traffic and mobility and parks and recreation". Sekula-Gibbs defeated Cooke and Gupta by receiving 48.43% of the vote, outpacing her nearest rival by nineteen percent. She was sworn in as director on November 20, 2019 and was reelected to her second term on November 12, 2021.

Dr. Sekula-Gibbs won reelection to the Board on November 7, 2023, pulling ahead of opponent Tricia Danto with 51.38% of the vote. Sekula-Gibbs has served as alternate chairman of the One Water Task Force and on the Visit The Woodlands board of directors, the Parks and Recreation advisory council, audit, budget, and investment committees. She successfully lobbied for the creation of the new Upper Watershed position on the San Jacinto Regional Flood Planning Group. She is also a member of the North Houston Association Water Committee.

In the arena of transportation, Sekula-Gibbs is the township's representative on the Conroe/The Woodlands Urbanized Area (UZA) Transit Advisory Committee, where she currently serves as chairman.

In 2024, Sekula-Gibbs was selected to serve on the Houston-Galveston Area Council's (H-GAC) link to HGAC Transportation Advisory Committee (TAC), where she currently serves as: primary member for the TAC Environmental category; Regional Transportation (RTP) Subcommittee-alternate member for the Environmental category, and Transportation Air Quality (TAQ) Subcommittee-primary member for the Local Government category.

== Personal life ==
Sekula-Gibbs has been married three times. The first time to Alan Greenberg, the second time to KHOU-TV newscaster Sylvan Rodriguez, who died of pancreatic cancer in 2000. Before his death, Rodriguez inspired Sekula-Gibbs to run for public office. In June 2002, she married Robert W. Gibbs Jr., former director of corporate community relations at Reliant Energy, and president of Reliant Energy Foundation. Mr. Gibbs established the law department at Houston Lighting and Power. The couple live in The Woodlands, Texas. Sekula-Gibbs is the mother of two adult children. She is a Roman Catholic.

== See also ==
- Women in the United States House of Representatives

U.S. House of Representatives
Preceded by Tom DeLay	Member of the U.S. House of Representatives from Texas's 22nd congressional district 2006–2007	Succeeded by Nick Lampson
U.S. order of precedence (ceremonial)
Preceded by Trey Radel as Former U.S. Representative	Order of precedence of the United States as Former U.S. Representative	Succeeded by Mayra Flores as Former U.S. Representative
