= David G. Wallace =

American politician

Mayor of Sugar Land
- In office May 2002 – July 2008
- Preceded by: Dean A. Hrbacek
- Succeeded by: James A. Thompson

Personal details
- Party: Republican
- Education: University of North Texas
- Occupation: Businessman

David Gordon Wallace is an American businessman, politician, and author from the state of Texas.

== Personal life ==
David Wallace attended Union College in Schenectady, New York, and later received a scholarship at the University of Reading in England for international studies in Real Estate, Finance and Law, before graduating from the University of North Texas with a Bachelor of Business Administration in Real Estate Finance.

== Political career ==
In 2001, Wallace was elected to Sugar Land City Council as a Single District Member representing District Four.

During the first year of his first term as a member of City Council, Wallace decided to pursue a mayoral campaign against the three-term incumbent mayor Dean A. Hrbacek, also a Republican. Wallace gained support of the Fort Bend County Republican Party Chair Eric Thode and former Sugar Land Mayor Lee Duggan. Wallace defeated Hrbacek in May 2002, winning approximately 55% of the vote.

While mayor, Wallace negotiated with Minute Maid to relocate the company's headquarters to Sugar Land.

In 2004, Wallace was reelected with no opposition, and ran unopposed again in 2006. Wallace elected not to run again during 2008.

In 2005, while serving as mayor, Wallace sought out a private development company, Cherokee Investments, to redevelop the Imperial Sugar Company's original site constructed more than 160 years ago.

Cherokee Investments closed on the Imperial Sugar tract and began redevelopment in that place.

== 2006 congressional election ==
While Wallace ran unopposed in 2006, a political development was happening at the federal level in Sugar Land. On the night of April 3, 2006, former House Majority Leader Tom DeLay decided to retire from Congress instead of facing a difficult re-election bid (for a twelfth term). On June 9, 2006, he officially resigned from Congress. DeLay had been the focus of an indictment issued in Travis County, Texas stemming from his funding of Republican candidates through such groups as TRMPAC, which funded Texas candidates, and ARMPAC, which funded federal candidates.

Republican Party precinct chairs ultimately endorsed Wallace's opponent, Shelley Sekula-Gibbs, to face Democrat Nick Lampson, a former Congressman from Beaumont who moved to Stafford, north of Sugar Land, with the original intent of challenging DeLay before DeLay dropped out.

Although Wallace previously indicated that he would continue to run even if Sekula-Gibbs received the party's endorsement, Wallace announced on August 21, 2006 that he would abandon his write-in campaign and that he would endorse Sekula-Gibbs, who won the remainder of Tom DeLay's unexpired term in a special election. Nick Lampson won the general election, despite a strong showing by Sekula-Gibbs and a visit by President George W. Bush and U.S. Senator Kay Bailey Hutchison.

Wallace also announced that he would not run for re-election as mayor of Sugar Land.

== Wallace-Bajjali and personal bankruptcy ==
Wallace co-founded Wallace Bajjali Development Partners, L.P., a real estate development firm. Wallace was no longer the chief executive officer, as announced on January 7, 2015. On March 24, 2015, David Wallace filed personal Chapter 7 bankruptcy in the U.S. Bankruptcy Court in Houston and, on the same day, Houston Public Media reported that Wallace Bajjali Development Partners had "lost millions of dollars in the 2009 collapse of the BizRadio Ponzi Scheme".
