= Jarvis Johnson =

American politician (born 1971)

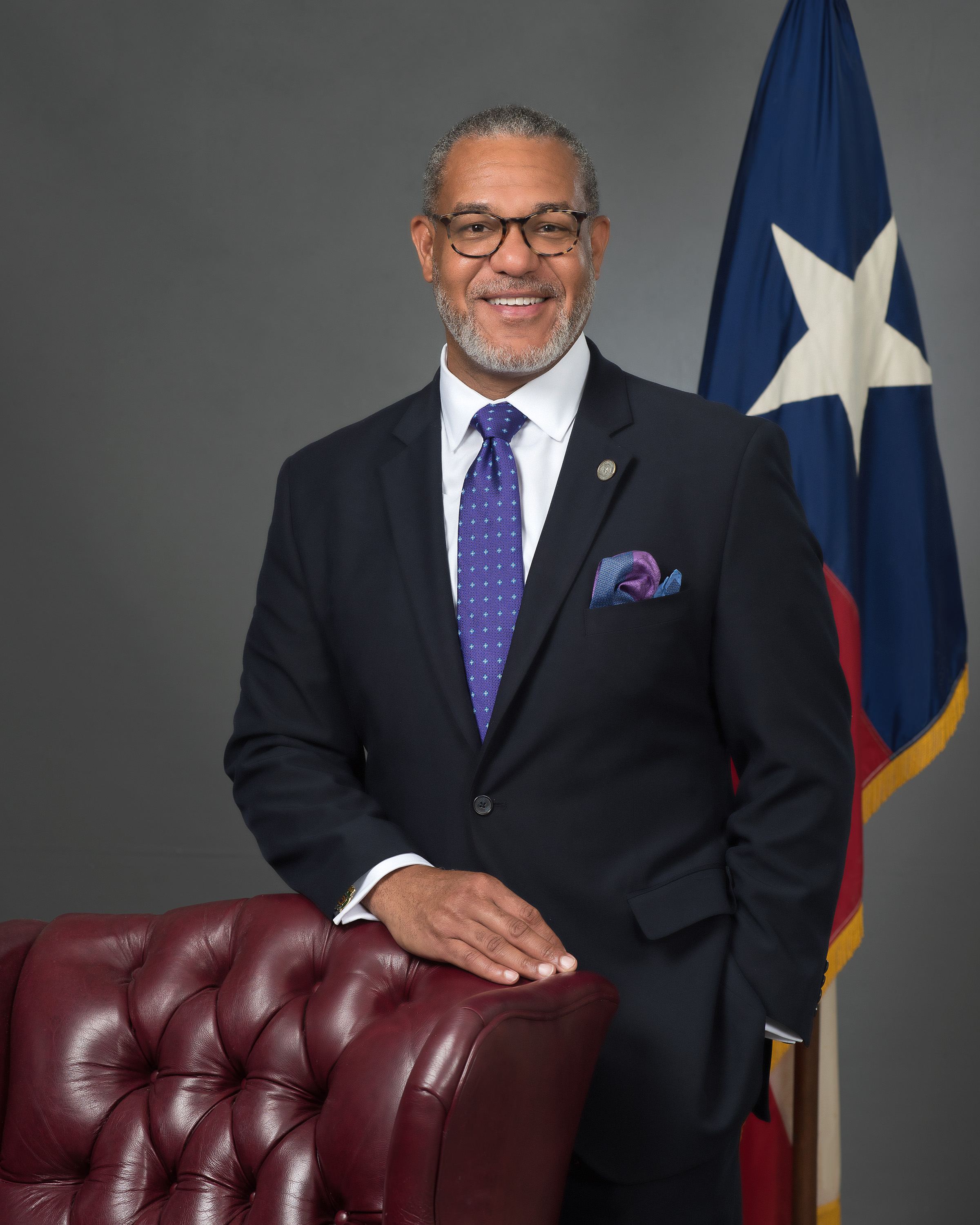
- Johnson in 2023

Member of the Texas House of Representatives from the 139th district
- In office May 19, 2016 – January 14, 2025
- Preceded by: Sylvester Turner
- Succeeded by: Charlene Ward Johnson

Member of the Houston City Council from the B District
- In office January 2, 2006 – January 2, 2012
- Preceded by: Carol Galloway
- Succeeded by: Jerry Davis

Personal details
- Born: Jarvis Diallo Johnson; September 27, 1971 (age 55) Houston, Texas, U.S.
- Party: Democratic
- Spouse: Charlene Ward (divorced)
- Education: Texas Southern University (BA)

Jarvis Diallo Johnson (born September 27, 1971) is an American entrepreneur and politician who served in the Texas House of Representatives from 2016 to 2025. A member of the Democratic Party, he previously served on the Houston City Council from 2006 to 2012.

== Early life and career ==
Johnson grew up in Houston's Fifth Ward.

In 1996, Johnson graduated from Texas Southern University with a degree in speech communications. In 1995, while in college, he became executive director of Phoenix Outreach Youth Center, ending his affiliation with them in 2005, the same year he was elected to the Houston City Council to represent District B.

== Political career ==
=== Houston City Council (2005–2009) ===
In 2005, Johnson ran for Houston City Council District B, a seat held by term limited Carol Mims Galloway. In an eight candidate race, Johnson received nearly 4,000 votes, earning a spot in the December run off election. In December 2005, Johnson won the Houston City Council District B race by over 60% of the vote. He was reelected in the 2007 elections and 2009 elections.

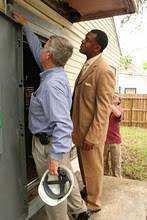
Johnson inspects a worn house in District B.

Johnson served as chair of the City of Houston's Human Services and Technology Access Committee. He also served on the Houston City Council's Committee on Budget and Fiscal Affairs, and the Housing and Community Development Committee, among others.

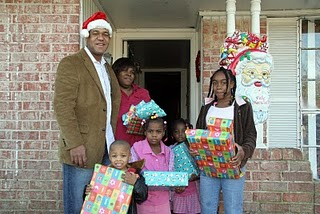
Johnson during the annual toy give away

In 2010, a police officer claimed Johnson failed to stop his vehicle when he tried to pull him over for speeding. He was arrested and charged with evading arrest, and later a grand jury cleared him of the charges, deciding there was not evidence that he did anything wrong.

=== 2010 U.S. House of Representatives campaign ===
On January 5, 2010, Johnson announced his candidacy for Texas's 18th Congressional District seat, a seat held by incumbent Sheila Jackson Lee.

Jackson Lee was in her third term on the Houston City Council in 1994 when she beat incumbent U.S. Representative Craig Washington on the theme that he was out of touch with his district. When Johnson announced his candidacy in 2010, he had just won a third term to a council seat within the 18th Congressional District. The congressional district encompasses much of urban Houston and is about 40% black with the remainder split between whites and Hispanics. It accounts for about a quarter of the city's more than 2 million residents.

=== Texas House of Representatives (2016–2025) ===
Johnson ran in the 2016 primary election, advanced to the runoff election, and won a special election called to determine an interim representative for 2016 and won the primary election runoff. Since he was unopposed in November 2016, Johnson winning the special election and runoff meant he was the District 139 state representative who would succeed Sylvester Turner. After 26 years, Turner stepped down from his state seat to become Houston's mayor.

Johnson won the May 7 special election, with 85% of the vote, to finish out the remainder of Turner's term as state representative of District 139. Turner swore him in, allowing Johnson to serve through December and immediately, fully assume former Turner's seniority status and his roles that include vice-chairman of the House Appropriations Committee.

When Johnson ran for the Texas Senate, his ex-wife, Charlene Ward Johnson won the Democratic primary to replace him. She ran unopposed, to be the district's state representative in 2025.

==== Legislation ====
Johnson advocated for education funding reform for Texas' HBCUs, noting disparity between them and other higher education institutions.

Johnson was the sole member to speak against HB 2908, a law codifying protections for police and peace officers, strongly opposing the bill on the grounds that it could make questioning an officer an act of resistance and therefore a hate crime.

For three consecutive legislative sessions (in 2019, 2021, and 2023), Johnson filed bills to end Confederate Heroes Day as a state holiday. The bills did not make it out of the House State Affairs Committee, and Speaker Dade Phelan who chaired the committee did not bring up the bill for a vote.

Johnson also filed multiple bills to apply pollution limits for concrete plants, which affect the air quality for districts such as the ones he represented, but these bills did not pass.

=== 2024 Texas Senate campaign ===
Johnson announced his campaign for the Texas Senate in the 15th district, the seat vacated by incumbent Democrat John Whitmire upon winning the 2023 Houston mayoral election. He placed first in the March 5 primary with 36% of the vote, advancing to a May runoff with Molly Cook. He was defeated in the runoff and in the Democratic primary to a full term by Cook.

=== 2026 U.S. House campaign ===
Following mid-decade redistricting by the Texas State Legislature of Texas's congressional districts in 2025, Johnson announced he would challenge incumbent Democratic U.S. representative Sylvia Garcia in the 29th district in 2026. Notably, The Texas Tribune reported that the newly-drawn district's shifting demographics could unearth racial tensions within the electorate as the Hispanic eligible voting population fell from 63% to 43% while the Black eligible voting population rose from 18% to 33% under the new lines. Johnson placed second in the March primary election, earning 35.7% to Garcia's 58.2% of the vote.

== Electoral history ==
=== 2005 ===
Houston City Council District B Election 2005
Candidate		Votes	%	±
	Willie J. Hunter	1,049	7.21%	
	Tommie Ruth Allen	1,456	10.01%	
	Anna Gray	426	2.93%	
	Charles A. Ingram	1,004	6.90%	
✓	Felicia Galloway-Hall	5,462	37.54%	
✓	Jarvis Johnson	3,830	26.33%	
	Angle S. Bush	326	2.24%	
	Robin German-Curtis	995	6.84%	

Houston City Council District B Election 2005, Runoff
Candidate		Votes	%	±
	Felicia Galloway-Hall	2,146	39.67%	
✓	Jarvis Johnson	3,264	60.33%	

=== 2007 ===
Houston City Council District B Election 2007
Candidate		Votes	%	±
✓	Jarvis Johnson	8,254	76.95%	
	Kenneth Perkins	2,473	23.05%	

=== 2009 ===
Houston City Council District B Election 2009
Candidate		Votes	%	±
	Roger Bowden	2,204	18.01%	
✓	Jarvis Johnson	10,033	81.99%	
