= Ellen Cohen =

American politician

Member of the Houston City Council from District C
- In office January 2, 2012 – January 2, 2020
- Preceded by: Anne Clutterbuck
- Succeeded by: Abbie Kamin

Member of the Texas House of Representatives from the 134th District
- In office January 11, 2007 – January 11, 2011
- Preceded by: Martha Wong
- Succeeded by: Sarah Davis

Personal details
- Born: 1940 (age 85–86) Cleveland, Ohio
- Party: Democratic (council is nonpartisan)
- Spouse: Lyon Cohen

Ellen Cohen is a Canadian American politician. She was a Democratic member of the Texas House of Representatives from District 134 from 2007 to 2011 and later a member of the Houston City Council.

== Personal life and career ==
Cohen was raised in Cleveland, Ohio. In 1966 she moved to Montreal, her husband's hometown, and raised her two children there. During her time in Montreal, she was diagnosed with breast cancer. This led her to found Reach to Recovery of Canada, a self-help post-mastectomy group.

In 1977, she and her husband moved to Houston. She served as the executive director of the American Jewish Committee from 1980 to 1990.

For 18 years, from 1990 to 2007, she served as president and CEO of the Houston Area Women's Center, which is dedicated to eliminating domestic and sexual violence. In that capacity she managed a $6.2 million budget and a 120-person staff, serving over 6,000 women, children, and men.

Cohen also serves or has served on the boards of Congregation Beth Israel; Faith Trust Institute; American Jewish Committee; American Leadership Forum; Houston Area Adult Protective Services and the National Violence Against Women Advisory Task Force. Cohen is also a former president of Leadership Houston and the board of the Medical Center Hospital.

== Political career ==
Endorsed by Houston Chronicle, the Sierra Club, the Texas State Teachers Association, and other local, regional and nationwide organizations, Cohen was elected State Representative District 134, which includes Bellaire, West University Place, River Oaks and parts of Meyerland and Neartown, in 2006.

Her competitors included incumbent Republican Martha Wong and Libertarian Mhair Dekmezian, a Rice University student. Cohen's campaign focused on improving public education, restoring children’s health insurance, finding solutions to the growing cost of college tuition and lowering homeowners’ insurance rate. During her 2006 campaign, Cohen out-raised incumbent Wong where the election was one of the most watched in the state - her opponent was elected in 2002 during redistricting making the district 55% Republican. Cohen stated during candidate forums where the district should have a representative who puts the residents, constituents, and the issues first, not partisanship first which Wong had done during her tenure. Several campaign ads circulated by Wong before the election attacked the following: the Children's Health Initiative Program (CHIP), immigration, and property taxes.

She was defeated in her 2010 bid for reelection by Sarah Davis.

== Awards ==
Cohen is the recipient of numerous awards for her contributions to the community. In July 2005, she was honored by the Equal Employment Opportunity Commission as an outstanding contributor to civil and human rights in Houston. In May 2008, she received the Woman of Wisdom Award from the Houston Area Women's Center. Other awards include the American Cancer Society's Texas Advocacy Award; the Vivian Miles Lifetime Achievement Award given by the Texas Association Against Sexual Assault; Texas Academy of Family Physicians 2008 Patient Advocacy Award; The Shattered Glass Award from Harris County Women's Political Caucus; Texas Executive Woman's Women on the Move Award; Celebration of Life Honoree by Woman's Hospital of Texas Research and Education Foundation; Leadership Houston Distinguished Alumnus Award; NAACP Outstanding Service Award; the American Jewish Committee's Max H. Nathan Award; an Oral History Honoree by Women of Achievement; the Outstanding Supporter Award from the Wind Coalition; and the Distinguished Leadership Award by the National Association for Community Leadership. In addition, she was named as one of Houston's 50 Most Influential Women by Houston Woman Magazine.

For her legislative accomplishments, Cohen received the "Best Freshman Performance as a Bill Sponsor" from the online political publication Capitol Inside for her work on House Bill 1751 which will provide $25 million toward sexual assault and prevention programs. She had previously been recognized by Capitol Inside for the Best General Election Challenger Campaign in 2006.

== Legislation ==
Cohen's first piece of legislation which passed into law was to fund sexual assault programs where patrons of sexually oriented businesses would charge an additional $5 - the money generated went to these programs.
