= Melissa Noriega =

American politician

Houston City Councillor At-large Seat #3
- In office July 2007 – December 2013
- Preceded by: Shelley Sekula-Gibbs
- Succeeded by: Michael Kubosh

Member of the Texas House of Representatives from the 145th District
- In office January 11, 2005 – August 28, 2005
- Preceded by: Rick Noriega
- Succeeded by: Rick Noriega

Personal details
- Born: July 14 Philadelphia, Pennsylvania
- Party: Democrat (council is nonpartisan)
- Spouse: Single
- Education: University of Houston
- Website: noriegafortexas.com

Melissa Meisgeier Noriega is a former member of the Houston City Council in Houston, Texas, having held At-Large Position 3. Noriega is an educator and civic leader in Houston and Harris County, Texas, as well as a former member of the Texas House of Representatives. She currently is part of the leadership team at BakerRipley, a community development non-profit.

== Educational work ==
Noriega was employed with the Houston Independent School District from 1981 to 2007 in various capacities.

== Tenure in the Texas House of Representatives ==
Noriega served as State Representative for Texas House District 145 in 2005 while her husband, State Representative Richard J. "Rick" Noriega, served in Afghanistan as part of Operation Enduring Freedom. She was sworn in on January 11, 2005. She filed eleven bills and succeeded at passing three into law. At the end of the legislative session, the House Democratic Caucus voted her freshman of the year. She relinquished the seat when her husband's tour of duty ended on August 26, 2005.

Preceded by Richard J. "Rick" Noriega	Member of the Texas House of Representatives from District 145 (Houston); January 11, 2005 – August 26, 2005	Succeeded by Richard J. "Rick" Noriega

== Houston City Council ==
Noriega was elected to At-Large Position 3 on the Houston City Council in a special election held on June 16, 2007. The seat had been vacated by Shelley Sekula-Gibbs when she won an earlier election to complete the term of Congressman Tom DeLay after he resigned from office. Noriega was subsequently elected to three two-year terms on the council, where she served as chair of the Public Safety Committee, vice-chair of the Development and Regulatory Affairs Committee, and on seven other council committees. In its endorsement of Noriega for a third term on the council, the Houston Chronicle praised Noriega for her effectiveness in dealing with Houston's pension issues and her efforts "to put Houston's infrastructure improvements on a more stable, pay-as-you-go basis." Noriega was blocked by term limits from seeking a fourth full term.

== Candidacy for Harris County Department of Education ==
In 2014, Noriega ran for At-Large Position 7 on the Harris County Department of Education, a body that supports Harris County's 26 independent school districts. Noriega, a Democrat, lost to Republican Don Sumners, a former Harris County Tax Assessor Collector.

== Candidacy for Texas House ==
Following State Representative Carol Alvarado's elevation to the Texas Senate in a special election on December 11, 2018, Noriega became a candidate in an eight-way race for Texas House District 145, the district she represented for several months while her then-husband, Rick Noriega was deployed to Afghanistan. In the January 29, 2019 special election, Noriega finished second behind Houston Planning Commissioner and funeral-home CEO Christina Morales, necessitating a runoff to pick the eventual winner.
