= Peter Hoyt Brown =

American politician (1936–2017)

Peter H. Brown
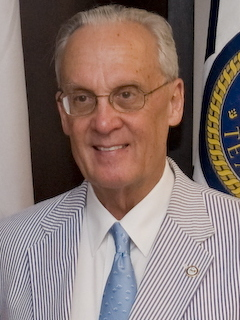
- Peter Brown

Member of the Houston City Council from the at-large #1 district
- In office January 2, 2006 – January 2, 2010
- Preceded by: Mark Ellis
- Succeeded by: Stephen Costello

Personal details
- Born: October 16, 1936 Houston, Texas
- Died: December 12, 2017 (aged 81) Houston, Texas
- Party: Democratic (council is nonpartisan)
- Spouse: Anne Brown
- Education: University of Houston; University of California, Berkeley; University of Pennsylvania
- Occupation: Architect, City planner

Military service
- Allegiance: United States
- Branch/service: United States Army
- Unit: Reserves

Peter Hoyt Brown (October 16, 1936 – December 12, 2017) was a politician who held office as an at-large council member in the city of Houston, Texas. Known locally as "Peter Brown," he was a candidate for the 2009 Houston mayoral race, to succeed then Mayor Bill White, who vacated the position due to term limits. Although an independent poll conducted by 11 News/ KUHF Houston Public Radio poll in late October 2009 showed Brown holding the lead in the mayor's race with a nine-point lead over his nearest opponent, he was eliminated in the November 3, 2009, election.

== Education and professional career ==
Brown grew up in Riverside Terrace in Houston, just north of Brays Bayou, in the North McGregor part of town, and attended St. John's School. He graduated with a bachelor's degree from the University of Houston, and went on to earn a master's degree in languages from University of California, Berkeley.

Upon graduation, Brown enlisted in the U.S. Army. After a year of active service, Brown entered the active reserves while attending the University of Pennsylvania. There, he earned master's degrees in architecture and urban planning. Today, he is the only city council member in Houston to have served in the U.S. military.

Brown began his career as an architect and urban planner in 1966, working on major projects in the northeast United States. In 1982 he moved back to Houston, and became a partner in an architecture and planning firm. A year later, he would found his own firm, which he grew into a successful national business. In 2003, Brown was elevated to Fellow of the American Institute of Architects, the profession's highest distinction. As an architect, has designed many municipal facilities, including affordable housing and traditional neighborhoods, fire and police stations, parks and recreation centers, jails and courthouses, libraries and health clinics, transit stations, and theaters.

Brown also served as an adjunct professor in the Department of Urban Planning & Environmental Policy graduate program at Texas Southern University.

Brown directed the Better Houston membership organization focused on improvements to local neighborhoods, transit, and urbanism.

== Political career ==
Brown first ran for an at-large seat on Houston City Council in 2003 against incumbent Council Woman Shelley Sekula-Gibbs. Brown narrowly lost to Sekula-Gibbs, receiving 48.5% of the vote, and raising more money than any previous city council candidate. In 2005, Brown ran again and won his seat, at-large position 1. In 2007, he was re-elected to his second term.

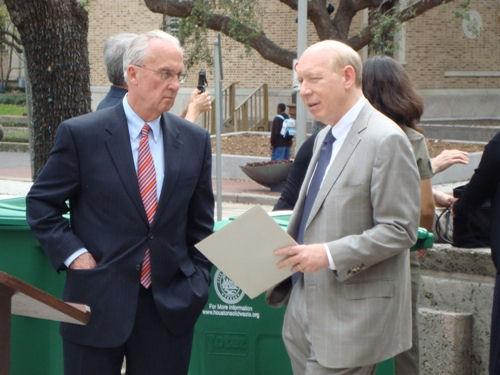
Brown chats with Mayor White moments before a press conference to announce a new single-stream recycling pilot program.

Starting when he took office in 2006, Brown was a neighborhood advocate, working for better street standards, making the city pedestrian-friendly, and instrumental in the creation of the Houston General Plan and the Houston Mobility Plan, and was involved in the creation of the Old Sixth Ward historic district.

Brown publicly supported a decentralized form of municipal government, and recently unveiled plans to decentralize the city government, and bring city services closer to neighborhoods. "We're a big, spread-out city and trying to run everything from a central, one central source, say downtown is not very cost-effective. To decentralize neighborhood services is something I think we need to take a close look at." Brown also supported a decentralized, restructured police department, saying that with centralized systems, “there is no accountability.” Brown has called this situation a “leadership opportunity for the next mayor to plow new ground.”

He also promoted and worked for more "green" initiatives including recycling, urban gardens and farming, and air quality standards. In January 2008, Mayor Bill White appointed Brown to chair the newly created Council Committee on Sustainable Growth. The committee considers strategies to promote environmental health, energy efficiency, and conservation of natural resources in the city of Houston. In October 2008, the Sustainable Growth Committee successfully initiated a program to recycle heavy organic yard waste which is expected to salvage 90,000 short tons (82,000 metric tons) annually, enough to fill the Chase Tower, the city's tallest structure. This, plus a new program to recycle scrap tires, will save Houston taxpayers over $1 million annually.

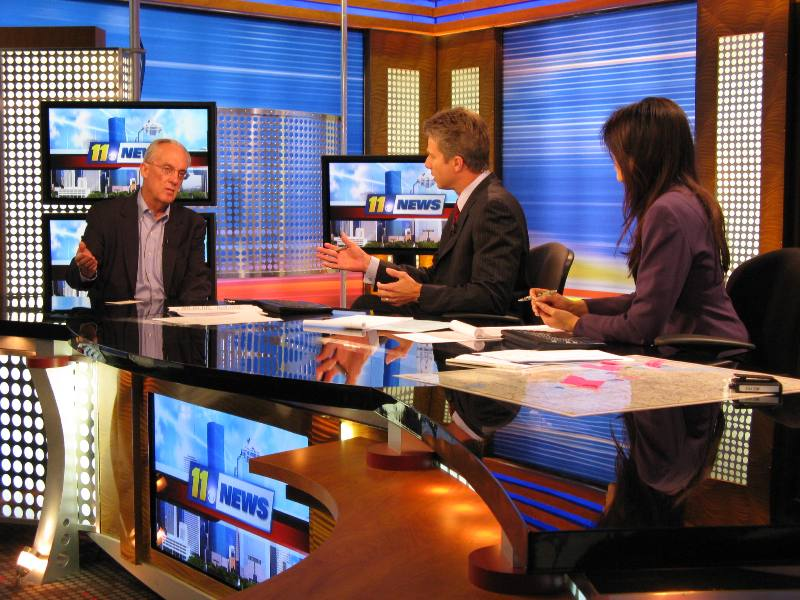
Brown appeared live on several news channels to speak on the city's hurricane recovery efforts.

In the aftermath of Hurricane Ike, Brown advocated for the importance of retrofitting the city's electrical infrastructure. The hurricane cut electric power to millions of customers in the Houston area for weeks. Brown called for the largest energy provider in Houston, CenterPoint Energy, to bury their overhead power lines and harden the city's electrical grid to prevent similar mass power outages from occurring in the future.

=== Houston mayoral race ===
In January 2008, Brown announced the creation of his mayoral exploratory committee. Since that announcement, Brown has received the public support and endorsement of several organizations and community leaders. On February 26, 2009, Brown officially announced his candidacy for Mayor of Houston, and succeed current term limited Mayor White, before supporters at Hermann Park in Houston. Other candidates include former City Attorney Gene Locke, Roy Morales, and City Controller Annise Parker.

Brown has focused much of his campaign around his experience as a businessman, architect and urban planner, and his "Blueprint for An Even Better Houston," which his campaign says "offers real solutions and real ideas for combatting traffic, crime, flooding and other challenges." The blueprint details policy agendas pertaining to the economy, public safety, transportation, flooding, energy, government efficiency and reform, and the environment.

Although his opponents are generally acknowledged to be more polished public speakers than he is, and some of them been politicians for much longer - building high name identification - observers have acknowledged that Brown seems to have outworked his opponents. The Chronicle's Rick Casey praised Brown's "energy" and wrote "Brown has campaigned harder and longer than any other candidate."

Brown's mayoral campaign reported raising over $477,000 in the first half of 2009, bringing his cash on hand amount at the time to $1.7 million, more than three times what his opponents reported. An independent poll conducted by the Houston Chronicle in late September showed Brown ahead of all of his opponents. A secondary independent poll conducted by 11 News/ KUHF Houston Public Radio poll in late October 2009, still showed Brown with a nine-point lead over his nearest opponent.

Although many independent polls showed Brown holding the lead in the mayor's race, he was eliminated in the November 3, 2009 election. The next week Brown publicly endorsed his former opponent, Annise Parker, in the mayor's race, an endorsement that was heavily sought after by both remaining candidates. Parker went on to win the mayor's race and was sworn in as mayor on January 4, 2010.

=== Mayoral results ===
Houston mayoral election, 2009
Party	Candidate	Votes	%	±%
Democratic	Annise Parker	54,193	31%	
Democratic	Gene Locke	45,954	26%	
Democratic	Peter Brown	39,904	22%	
Republican	Roy Morales	35,925	20%	
Socialist Workers	Amanda Ulman	992	1%	

== Electoral history ==
=== 2003 ===
Houston City Council At-Large Position 3 Election 2003
Candidate		Votes	%	±
✓	Shelley Sekula-Gibbs	104,204	41.62%	
✓	Peter Brown	64,113	25.61%	
	Jolanda (Jo) Jones	54,798	21.89%	
	Rene L. Hicks	27,238	10.88%	

Houston City Council At-Large Position 3 Election 2003, Runoff
Candidate		Votes	%	±
✓	Shelley Sekula-Gibbs	104,604	52.40%	
	Peter Brown	95,019	47.60%	

=== 2005 ===
Houston City Council At-Large Position 1 Election 2005
Candidate		Votes	%	±
✓	Peter Brown	77,793	51.03%	
	Roy Morales	48,644	31.91%	
	Michael "Griff" Griffin	26,003	17.06%	

=== 2007 ===
Houston City Council At-Large Position 1 Election 2007
Candidate		Votes	%	±
✓	Peter Brown		>99%	
