= Garnet Coleman =

American politician (1961–2026)

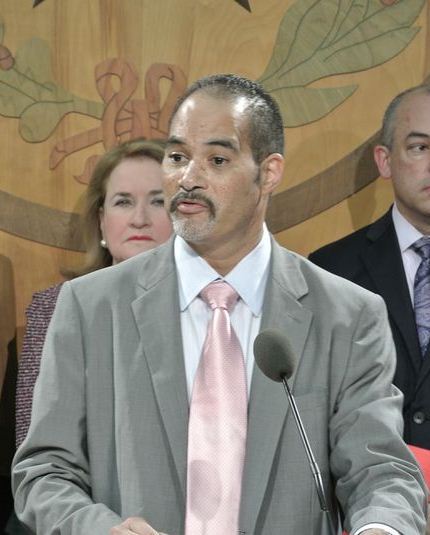
- Coleman in 2013

Member of the Texas House of Representatives from the 147th district
- In office October 18, 1991 – February 28, 2022
- Preceded by: Larry Q. Evans
- Succeeded by: Jolanda Jones

Personal details
- Born: Garnet Fredrick Coleman; September 8, 1961 Washington, D.C., U.S.
- Died: September 23, 2026 (aged 65)
- Party: Democratic
- Spouse: Angelique F. Coleman
- Children: 2
- Education: University of St. Thomas (BA)

Garnet Fredrick Coleman (September 8, 1961 – September 23, 2026) was an American politician. From 1991 to 2022, he was a member of the Texas House of Representatives for the 147th district, located entirely within Houston and Harris County.

== Early life and education ==
Coleman was born on September 8, 1961, in Washington, DC, and raised in Houston, Texas. His father was John B. Coleman, a Houston doctor. As of 2006, the family of Coleman's father had lived in Houston's Third Ward neighborhood for over 100 years.

He graduated from Jack Yates High School in Houston, and the University of Saint Thomas in Houston.

Coleman attended Howard University in Washington, D.C. and in 1990 graduated from the University of St. Thomas cum laude with a Bachelor of Arts. He also completed the Harvard University Senior Executive Program for State and Local Government.

== Political career ==
Coleman was elected to his first term as a state representative in 1991, at age 29. His district included Downtown Houston, the Hobby Airport area, Midtown Houston, Sagemont, and the Third Ward.

He was named Texas Monthly Ten Best Legislators List on two occasions. Most recently he received the 2005 Reintegration Award presented by Eli Lilly and Company, a national award given in acknowledgment of efforts to increase services and decrease the stigma associated with mental illness.

== Incident with police officer ==
On July 14, 2015, Coleman was stopped by a police officer for driving 94 miles per hour. Coleman later said of the incident, "He talked to me like I was a child... He was so rude and nasty. Even when he found out I was a legislator, he became more rude and nasty. And I didn't understand why this guy was continuing to go on and on and treat me like a child. And basically like I'm saying is treat me like a boy. I want to be very clear about that." Even so, Coleman was neither issued a citation for speeding nor charged with perjury. However, KHOU and the Houston Chronicle later reported an analysis of the audio from a dashcam recording of Coleman's accusations against the police officer which appeared to show the police officer treating Coleman with respect and Coleman asking for special treatment.

== Political positions ==
Coleman, in regards to the Third Ward, expressed his opposition to gentrification and a desire to keep the original residents in the neighborhood. Coleman had some control over the Midtown Tax Increment Financing District, which bought land in the Third Ward and enacted deeds restricting what may be done with the land, so that the land could indefinitely be used to house low income residents. In 2009, Coleman said "We learned a lot from the debacle in the Fourth Ward. So it would be stupid not to respond to the negative byproducts of rapid development. We want to find people who will make this community better by becoming part of its fabric, not by changing its fabric." In regards to the Fourth Ward in 2009, Coleman said that it cannot recapture the sense of community that it used to have. Coleman added "the residents got pushed to the suburbs, and the businesses got wiped away."

== Personal life and death ==
Coleman was diagnosed with bipolar disorder after periods of depression beginning when he was 16.

Garnet Coleman died on September 23, 2026, at the age of 65.

Texas House of Representatives
Preceded by Larry Q. Evans	Member of the Texas House of Representatives from the 147th district 1991–2022	Succeeded by Jolanda Jones
