= Annise Parker =

American politician

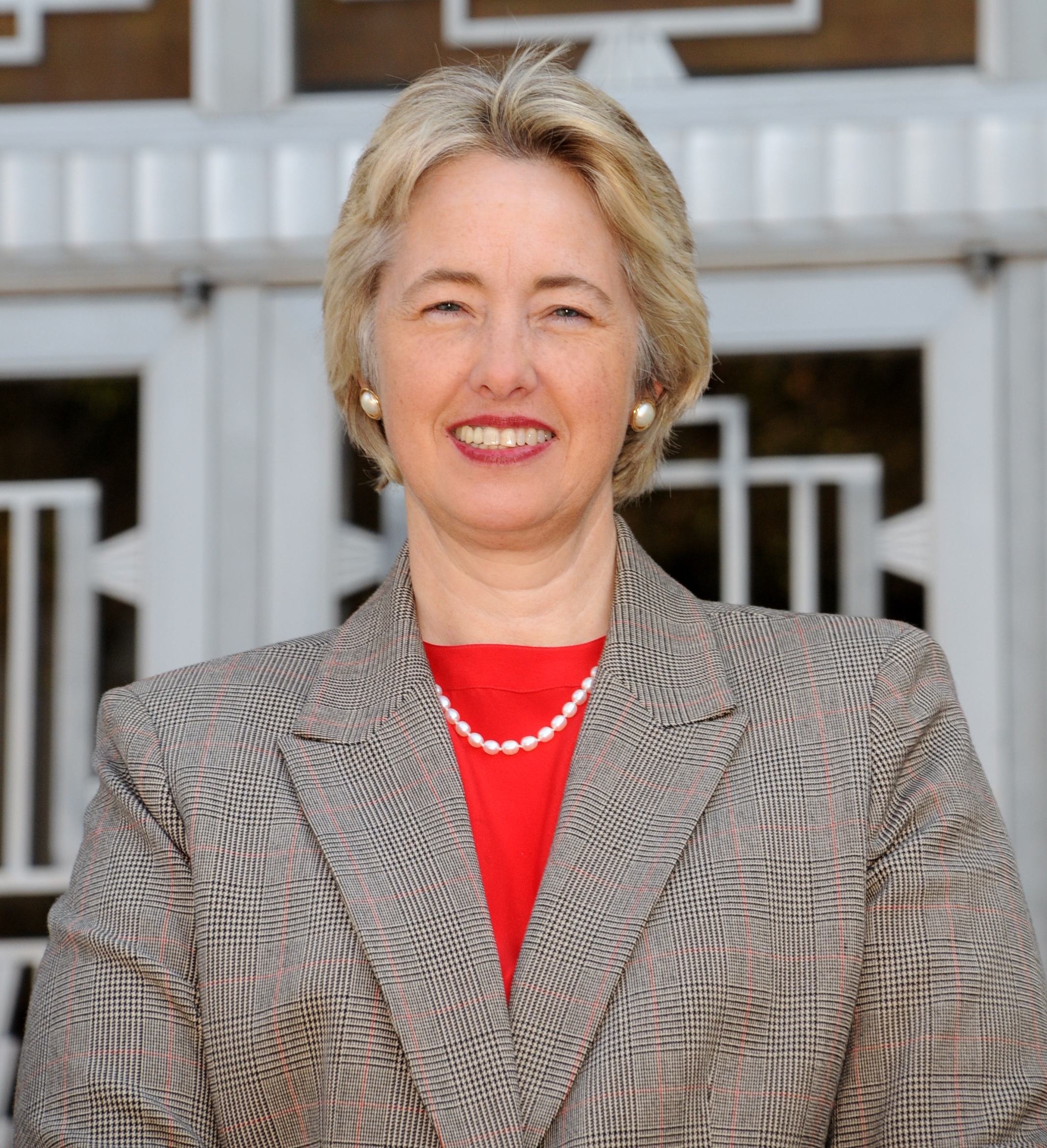
- Parker in 2008

61st Mayor of Houston
- In office January 2, 2010 – January 2, 2016
- Preceded by: Bill White
- Succeeded by: Sylvester Turner

14th City Controller of Houston
- In office January 2, 2004 – January 2, 2010
- Preceded by: Judy Johnson
- Succeeded by: Ronald Green

Member of the Houston City Council from the at-large district Position 1
- In office January 2, 1998 – January 2, 2004
- Preceded by: Gracie Saenz
- Succeeded by: Mark Ellis

Personal details
- Born: Annise Danette Parker; May 17, 1956 (age 70) Houston, Texas, U.S.
- Party: Democratic
- Spouse: Kathy Hubbard (m. 2014)
- Children: 2
- Education: Rice University (BA)
- Website: Campaign website

Annise Danette Parker (born May 17, 1956) is an American politician from the state of Texas. A Democrat, Parker served as the 61st Mayor of Houston, Texas, from 2010 until 2016. She also served as an at-large member of the Houston City Council from 1998 to 2003 and as city controller from 2004 to 2010.

Parker is Houston's second female mayor (after Kathy Whitmire). She is also one of the first openly gay mayors of a major U.S. city, with Houston being the most populous U.S. city to elect an openly gay mayor until Lori Lightfoot was elected mayor of Chicago in 2019.

== Early life and education ==
Parker was born in the Spring Branch community of Houston on May 17, 1956. Her mother, Kay Parker, was a bookkeeper. Parker was adopted by her mother's second husband, Ivy Leslie Parker, who worked for the Red Cross. She lived briefly in Mississippi and South Carolina. In 1971, when Parker was 15, her family moved to a U.S. Army post in Mannheim, Germany for two years. In Germany, she volunteered in the Red Cross youth service organization and worked at the post library.

Growing up, Parker was shy and suffered from extreme anxiety; her family nicknamed her "Turtle". She has maintained a turtle collection.

Parker graduated from Stall High School in North Charleston, South Carolina in 1974 and was named a National Merit Scholar. During her senior year of high school, Parker participated in the school’s National Honor Society, Ecology Club, and Christian Youth Fellowship and was a high jumper and long jumper on the track team.

Parker began attending Rice University in 1974, working several jobs to pay for her room and board. While at Rice, Parker founded a lesbian student group. A member of Baker College (a residential college at Rice), she graduated from Rice in 1978 with a bachelor's degree in anthropology, psychology and sociology. In 2005, Parker completed Harvard University's John F. Kennedy School of Government program for Senior Executives in State and Local Government as a David Bohnett LGBTQ Victory Institute Leadership Fellow.

== Career ==
Prior to serving as an elected official, Parker worked in the oil and gas industry as a software analyst for over 20 years, including 18 years at Mosbacher Energy. In addition, she co-owned Inklings Bookshop with business partner Pokey Anderson from 1989 until 1999, and served as president of the Neartown Civic Association from 1995 to 1997. In 1986 and 1987, she was president of the Houston GLBT Political Caucus.

=== Houston City Council ===
Parker ran unsuccessfully for Houston City Council in District C in 1991. In 1995, she ran for City Council again, finishing third in a special election for At-Large Position 4 after Sheila Jackson Lee vacated the seat upon her election to Congress. In 1997, Parker prevailed in the runoff election for At-Large Position 1 to become Houston's first openly gay elected official. She was re-elected twice to the same seat in 1999 and 2001 without being forced to a run-off.

=== Houston City Controller ===
In 2003, Parker was elected City Controller. She was re-elected in 2005 and 2007 unopposed. In addition, Parker also secured a seat for a controller's appointee on the Houston Municipal Pension System Board of Trustees, marking the first time the city's chief financial officer has had any involvement in the pension system."

=== Mayor of Houston ===
==== 2009 election ====
In 2009, Parker announced her candidacy for the office of Mayor of Houston in a video posted online to her campaign website. She was endorsed by several organizations and campaigned on a platform of better city security and financial efficiency. During the run-off election, Parker was endorsed by former rival Peter Hoyt Brown. The city's primary newspaper, the Houston Chronicle, endorsed Parker, citing her experience. Parker was elected mayor on December 12, 2009, and assumed office on January 2, 2010. Houston became the largest U.S. city ever to have an openly gay individual serve as mayor. After the election, Parker declared that the top priorities of her administration would be improving transportation, balancing the city's budget, and selecting a new police chief.

==== 2011 election ====
In the 2011 election, Parker won a second term as Houston's mayor by defeating Fernando Herrera, Jack O'Connor, Dave Wilson, Kevin Simms, and Amanda Ulman without a runoff.

==== 2013 election ====
In November 2013, Parker won a third term as Houston's mayor by winning 57.22% of the vote, making a runoff unnecessary.

==== Tenure ====
During her tenure as mayor, Parker addressed budget challenges following the recession while pursuing initiatives related to transportation and public services. Her administration also drew national attention for the passage and subsequent repeal of the Houston Equal Rights Ordinance (HERO).

On May 28, 2014, the Houston City Council passed the Houston Equal Rights Ordinance (HERO) which was authored by Parker, by a vote of 11 to 6. Mayor Parker had certified that "there exists a public emergency requiring that this Ordinance be passed finally on the date of its introduction". The measure banned discrimination on the basis of sexual orientation, gender identity, sex, race, color, ethnicity, national origin, age, religion, disability, pregnancy, genetic information, family, marital, and military status. It applied to housing, businesses that serve the public, private employers, city employment, and city contracting.

On July 3, 2014, opponents of HERO submitted 50,000 signatures to the city to force the ordinance to a vote of the public. The city announced that the opponents were 2,022 signatures short of the 17,269 needed to put the matter to a vote. HERO opponents filed a lawsuit against Mayor Parker and the city on August 5, 2014. In response, city attorneys defending the law filed subpoenas for sermons from local Christian pastors. Attorneys for the pastors called the subpoenas retaliation against Christians for opposing the ordinance. Parker maintained that the attorneys who dealt with the lawsuit for the city were outside lawyers (i.e., not city employees) and that she and City Attorney David Feldman had been unaware of the subpoenas. After what some news organizations called a "firestorm" of criticism over the subpoenas (Parker said that she had been "vilified coast to coast"), Parker directed the city's attorneys on October 29, 2014, to withdraw the subpoenas. After the subpoenas were withdrawn, local city pastors filed a civil rights lawsuit against Parker.

On November 3, 2015, Houston voters overturned HERO by a 61%-39% margin.

As mayor, Parker enacted an ordinance making it illegal to share food with the homeless in public spaces. Lawsuits continue over the ordinance, with a judge ruling in 2024 that local organization Food Not Bombs Houston could sue the city over it.

Due to term limits, Parker was not eligible to run for a fourth term in 2015.

=== Post-mayoral career ===
After leaving the office of Mayor in 2016, Parker has worked for nonprofit organizations in Houston. She was Senior Vice President and Chief Strategy Officer for community development nonprofit BakerRipley. From December 2017 to March 2025, Parker served as CEO and President of the LGBTQ+ Victory Fund and Leadership Institute. She is also a professor at the Doerr Institute for New Leaders at Rice University.

=== 2026 Harris County Judge campaign ===
Media reports in May 2024 indicated that Parker was considering a 2026 candidacy for county judge. On June 11, 2025, Parker announced her run on the steps of the Harris County Civil Courthouse. Incumbent county judge Lina Hidalgo later announced she would not seek a third term. Parker finished ahead of former Houston city councilor Letitia Plummer in the Democratic primary, but narrowly lost to Plummer in the runoff.

== Personal life ==
Parker and her wife, Kathy Hubbard, have been together since 1990. On January 16, 2014, Parker and Hubbard were married in Palm Springs, California. They have two adopted children together. In addition, the couple provided a home to a teenaged boy; they consider him their son as well.

== Awards and honors ==
In June 2020, in honor of the 50th anniversary of the first LGBTQ Pride parade, Queerty named Parker among the fifty heroes "leading the nation toward equality, acceptance, and dignity for all people."

== Electoral history ==
=== 2003 ===
Houston Controller Election 2003
Candidate		Votes	%	±
✓	Annise Parker	109,393	42%	
✓	Bruce Tatro	52,366	20%	
	Mark Lee	40,103	15%	
	Gabriel Vasquez	30,784	12%	
	Steve Jones	26,303	10%	

Houston Controller Election 2003, Runoff
Candidate		Votes	%	±
✓	Annise Parker	127,280	62.05%	
	Bruce Tatro	77,849	37.95%	

==== 2005 ====
Houston Controller Election 2005
Candidate		Votes	%	±
✓	Annise Parker			

==== 2007 ====
Houston Controller Election 2007
Candidate		Votes	%	±
✓	Annise Parker			

==== 2009 ====
Houston mayoral election, 2009
Candidate		Votes	%	±
✓	Annise Parker	53,919	30.82%	
✓	Gene Locke	43,974	25.14%	
	Peter Brown	39,456	22.56%	
	Roy Morales	35,802	20.47%	

Houston mayoral runoff election, 2009
Candidate		Votes	%	±
✓	Annise Parker	81,971	52.8%	
	Gene Locke	73,331	47.2%	

==== 2011 ====
Houston mayoral election, 2011
Candidate		Votes	%	±
✓	Annise Parker (Inc.)	59,156	50.83%	
	Jack O'Connor	17,237	14.81%	
	Fernando Herrera	16,712	14.36%	
	Dave Wilson	13,648	11.73%	
	Kevin Simms	7,797	6.70%	
	Amanda Ulman	1,835	1.58%	
Turnout		116,385		

==== 2013 ====
Houston mayoral election, 2013

Candidate	Vote Number	Vote Percentage
Annise D. Parker	97,009	57.22%
Ben Hall	46,775	27.59%
Eric B. Dick	18,302	10.79%
Victoria Lane	1,782	1.05%
Don Cook	1,720	1.01%
Keryl Burgess Douglas	1,192	0.70%
Michael Fitzsimmons	1,179	0.70%
Derek A. Jenkins	823	0.49%
Charyl L. Drab	767	0.45%

== See also ==
- LGBT community of Houston

Political offices
Preceded by Bill White	Mayor of Houston; 2010–2016	Succeeded by Sylvester Turner
