= Pete Olson =

American politician (born 1962)

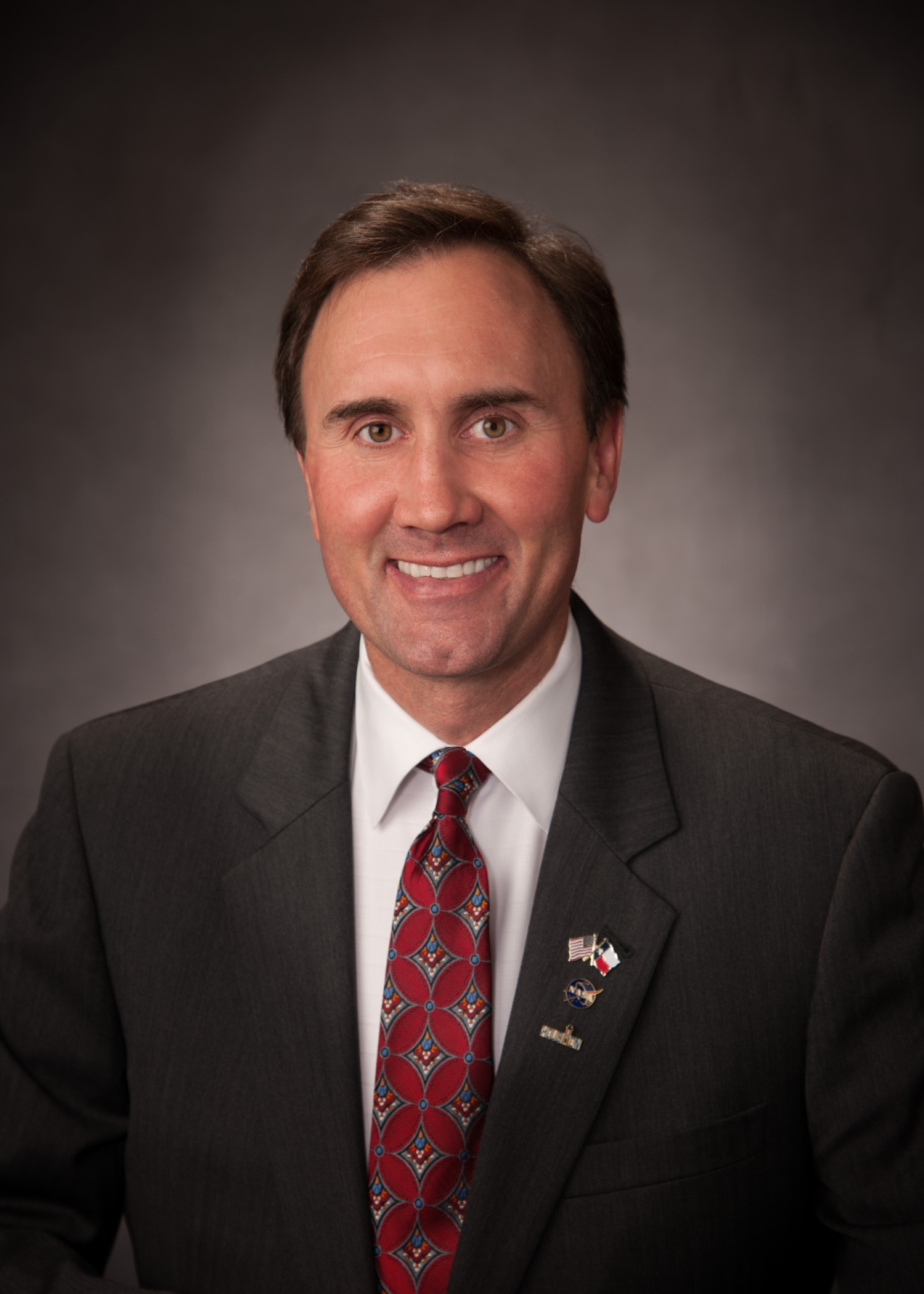

Member of the U.S. House of Representatives from Texas's 22nd district
- In office January 3, 2009 – January 3, 2021
- Preceded by: Nick Lampson
- Succeeded by: Troy Nehls

Personal details
- Born: Peter Graham Olson; December 9, 1962 (age 63) Fort Lewis, Washington, U.S.
- Party: Republican
- Spouse: Nancy Olson
- Children: 2
- Education: Rice University (BA); University of Texas, Austin (JD)

Military service
- Branch/service: United States Navy
- Years of service: 1988–1997 (active); 1997–2009 (reserve)
- Rank: Lieutenant Commander
- Awards: Joint Service Commendation Medal; Navy and Marine Corps Commendation Medal; Joint Service Achievement Medal; Armed Forces Expeditionary Medal; Southwest Asia Service Medal; Joint Chiefs of Staff Badge

Peter Graham Olson (born December 9, 1962) is an American politician who served as the U.S. representative for Texas's 22nd congressional district from 2009 to 2021. His district included much of southern Houston, as well as most of the city's southwestern suburbs such as Katy, Pearland, and Sugar Land. He is a member of the Republican Party. On July 25, 2019, Olson announced that he would retire at the end of his term. He was succeeded by fellow Republican Troy Nehls.

== Early life and education ==
Peter Graham Olson was born in 1962 in Fort Lewis, Washington. In 1972, Olson moved with his family to Seabrook, Texas, a suburb of Houston, where he attended public schools, graduating from Clear Lake High School in 1981. Olson attended college at Rice University, where he played college basketball his freshman year; he earned a Bachelor of Arts degree in computer science in 1985. He subsequently attended law school at the University of Texas at Austin, receiving his J.D. and being admitted to the State Bar of Texas in 1988.

== Career ==
He joined the United States Navy after graduating from law school and earned his Naval Aviator wings in March 1991. After earning his wings as a P-3C Orion pilot, post-Gulf War, he flew missions over the Persian Gulf, the Indian Ocean, and the Pacific. In 1994, he was assigned as a Naval liaison to the United States Senate, during which time he assisted Republican U.S. Senator Phil Gramm on several overseas trips. He served in the U.S. Navy for nine years.

After leaving active military duty, he joined Senator Gramm's staff in 1998. After Gramm's retirement from the Senate in 2002, Olson served as chief of staff to Gramm's successor, U.S. Senator and former Texas Attorney General John Cornyn, from December 2002 until May 2007.

== U.S. House of Representatives ==
=== Elections ===
==== 2008 ====
Olson defeated incumbent Democratic Representative Nick Lampson in the general election on November 4, 2008. Olson received 53% of the vote and Lampson received 45%. Olson won the Republican nomination by defeating former Congresswoman Shelley Sekula-Gibbs in the April 8, 2008, run-off election. Democratic candidate Nick Lampson won in 2006 when the 11-term Republican incumbent, former House Majority Leader Tom DeLay, was indicted. DeLay's resignation came too late for another Republican to replace him on the ballot, so Lampson defeated a Republican running as a write-in candidate.

An October 22, 2008, poll by John Zogby and The Houston Chronicle stated that Olson had a 17-point lead over Lampson. On October 30, 2008, Larry Sabato predicted in the Crystal Ball that Olson's congressional race would be a race that would be a "Republican Pick Up." Lampson was considered the most vulnerable Democratic incumbent in the House because of the heavily Republican tilt of the district. With a Cook Partisan Voting Index of R+15, it was the fourth most Republican district in the nation to be represented by a Democratic representative. U.S. President George W. Bush carried the 22nd with 64% of the vote in 2004.

Due to the unusual circumstances in District 22, the race attracted national attention. In 2007, Stuart Rothenberg called the district "arguably the best Republican takeover opportunity in the country". After Olson was nominated, the Electoral-vote.com website identified his campaign as "probably the GOP's best pickup opportunity for 2008."

The Hill, a leading Washington, D.C., political newspaper, opined that Olson's victory over Sekula Gibbs has set "up one of the top House races in the country in a conservative Houston district."

Republican primary race

In 2007, Olson announced he would run for the Republican nomination in the 22nd District. He was one of 10 Republicans in the field. Also running were Sekula-Gibbs, former Pasadena, Texas, mayor John Manlove, former Sugar Land mayor Dean Hrbacek, State Representative Robert Talton, Senior District Judge Jim Squier, Texas State Board of Education member Cynthia Dunbar, and three minor candidates. Sekula-Gibbs won the first round with 30%. Olson finished second, with 21%. As Sekula-Gibbs finished well short of the majority needed to win the nomination outright, Olson and Sekula-Gibbs advanced to a runoff in April. Sekula-Gibbs criticized Olson as "a Washington insider ... [who] moved here just six months ago to run." Nevertheless, 12 of Texas' 19 Republican congressmen endorsed Olson in the primary.

Olson won the April 8 runoff in a rout with 69 percent of the vote to Sekula-Gibbs' 31 percent.

General election race

Olson faced Lampson in the general election, and John Wieder, the Libertarian Party candidate. Many election experts considered the race one of the best opportunities for the Republicans to pick up a Democratic seat. Hastings Wyman's Southern Political Report placed the race on its watch list because the roots of the district are solidly Republican, and Lampson won the seat with only 52 percent against a write-in candidate. On June 20, 2008, the Washington Post's "The Fix" commented on the congressional race: "it's hard to see Rep. Nick Lampson (D) winning reelection. Lampson's slim hopes got even slimmer" with the nomination of Olson. Olson and Lampson agreed to a debate of the issues on October 20, 2008, in Rosenberg, Texas.

Fundraising efforts

At the end of March 2008, Olson's campaign was technically in debt, with almost $128,000 on hand and a debt to the candidate, who provided a personal loan of $175,000.

On June 5, 2008, outgoing Vice President Dick Cheney visited Houston to raise money for Olson's congressional campaign. The event took place at the home of Houston billionaire Dan Duncan. From July 1 to September 30, 2008, Olson raised more money than Lampson, $312,700 to $149,000. In the November 2008 election, Olson defeated Lampson with 53 percent of the vote to Lampson's 45%. He won four of the district's five counties.

==== 2010 ====
Olson won re-election in 2010 with 67 percent of the vote against Democratic challenger Kesha Rogers.

==== 2012 ====
Olson won election to a third term with 64% of the vote to Democrat Kesha Rogers' 32%.

==== 2014 ====
In the November 4 general election, Olson defeated Democratic nominee Frank Briscoe.

==== 2016 ====
Olson won his fifth term in the House in the general election held on November 8, 2016. He polled 181,864 votes (59.2 percent) to 123,670 (40.5 percent) for his Democratic opponent, Democrat Mark Gibson.

==== 2018 ====
Olson campaigned against Democrat Sri Preston Kulkarni, a former diplomat raised in Houston whose mother's family traces their ancestry back to Sam Houston, one of the founders of Texas. Olson refused to respond to a constituent's question on why he had called Kulkarni an "Indo-American who's a carpetbagger." Olson's untrue claim that Pakistanis attacked the US on 9/11 has been interpreted as an effort to exploit anti-Pakistani sentiment in his district. Olson won the election with 51.4% of the vote, to Kulkarni's 46.5%.

=== House tenure ===
During the 2008 campaign, Olson claimed he was a better fit for the district than Lampson. Olson told Wall Street Journal reporter Leslie Eaton that "I have conservative values, and he (Lampson) doesn't." Indeed, not long after being sworn in, Olson joined the Republican Study Committee, a caucus of conservative House Republicans. Olson opposed the current incarnation of Interstate 69, which since 2002 had been part of Governor Rick Perry's controversial Trans-Texas Corridor, and a project Phil Gramm did not provide funding for as a U.S. Senator. The previous incarnation of I-69 (which Gramm did fund) was slated to go through the current U.S. Highway 59 which passes through Houston and outlying suburbs such as Sugar Land and Humble. On July 24, 2013, Olson voted to continue funding NSA surveillance.

In mid-November 2013, Olson led a group of 19 other Republican congressmen in an effort to impeach Attorney General Eric Holder, charging that Holder had refused to comply with a subpoena issued by the House Committee on Oversight and Government Reform in 2011 and that he had failed to enforce laws defending the Defense of Marriage Act (which had been declared unconstitutional by the Supreme Court) or mandatory minimum sentencing for low-level drug offenders. Olson also charged that Holder had failed to enforce the Controlled Substances Act by not suing Washington and Colorado for deciding to regulate rather than criminalize marijuana.

On June 9, 2017, Olson stated during a radio broadcast that former President Bill Clinton had admitted to the murder of White House aide Vincent Foster and had threatened former Attorney General Loretta Lynch with similar violence if she did not drop an investigation of former Secretary of State Hillary Clinton. When subsequently asked for evidence to support his claims, Olson said: "In my discussion about Loretta Lynch and Vince Foster, I took the accusations a step too far. I regret my choice of words."

On August 15, 2018, Olson incorrectly claimed in a speech that "[on] September 11th, 2001, 3000 innocent Americans were killed by terrorists from Pakistan." In fact, none of the 9/11 hijackers were of Pakistani origin. Congressman Olson later told a reporter that he had misspoken when he made the claim. Critics maintain he did so on purpose to exploit anti-Pakistani sentiment in his district.

=== Committee assignments ===
- Committee on Energy and Commerce
  - Subcommittee on Commerce, Manufacturing and Trade
  - Subcommittee on Energy and Power

=== Caucus memberships ===
Congressional Constitution Caucus, Aerospace Caucus, General Aviation Caucus, Coal Caucus, Balanced Budget Amendment Caucus, Natural Gas Caucus, National Guard and Reserve Caucus, Beef Caucus, Gulf Coast Caucus, Cystic Fibrosis Caucus, Taiwan Caucus, Ports to Plains Caucus, Diabetes Caucus, Rice Caucus, Johnson Caucus, Congressional Arts Caucus, Congressional Western Caucus.

=== Civil Rights Uniformity Act ===
Olson sponsored the Civil Rights Uniformity Act of 2016 (HR 5812) which would strictly limit the definition of gender to the person's gender assigned at birth for the purposes of interpreting federal civil rights laws, federal administrative agency regulations, and other federal guidance. The proposed legislation would effectively remove transgender people as a protected class, but the bill died in committee. In 2017, Olson reintroduced the bill as the Civil Rights Uniformity Act of 2017 (HR 2796) with language identical to HR 5812, including a reference to "President Barack Obama's administration" which had, in the bill's language, "attempted to replace the word 'sex' with the phrase 'gender identity' for purposes of Federal antidiscrimination law and policy through a series of unilateral executive actions" and further, that "the Obama administration's actions are an affront to the rule of law, the separation of powers, the will of the people, language, history, safety, privacy, and biological realities." Olson argued that "only Congress has the constitutional authority to change laws" and that interpreting "sex" to include "gender identity" was not the original or explicit intent of the Civil Rights Act of 1964. Critics noted the effect of stripping federal protections from transgender people would only exacerbate existing discrimination and could lead to "a declaration of an open season for discrimination against transgender people."

In a press release following the introduction of HR 2796, Olson stated that gender identity should not be treated as a protected class unless explicitly established by Congress. "The Obama Administration strongly overreached by unilaterally redefining the definition of 'sex' with respect to the Civil Rights Act outside of the lawmaking process. We must reject the notion of false power stolen from Congress by a White House seeking to impose social policy on America. The Founding Fathers never intended unelected bureaucrats in federal agencies to make sweeping changes to the definition of gender." The arguments were consistent with Olson's prior statements following the introduction of HR 5812, which stated it "will ensure that gender identity is not treated as a protected class in Federal Law or Policy without the affirmative approval of the people's representatives in Congress."

== Electoral history ==
Texas's 22nd congressional district: 2008–2018 results
Year	Republican	Votes	Pct	Democratic	Votes	Pct	Libertarian	Party	Votes	Pct	Green	Party	Votes	Pct
2008	Pete Olson	161,600	51%	Nick Lampson	139,879	45%	John Wieder	Libertarian	6,823	2%				
2010	Pete Olson	140,537	67%	Kesha Rogers	62,082	30%	Steven Susman	Libertarian	5,538	3%				
2012	Pete Olson	160,668	64%	Kesha Rogers	80,203	32%	Steven Susman	Libertarian	5,986	2%	Don Cook	Green	4,054	2%
2014	Pete Olson	100,861	67%	Frank Briscoe	47,844	32%	Rob Lapham	Libertarian	2,861	2%				
2016	Pete Olson	181,864	60%	Mark Gibson	123,679	40%								
2018	Pete Olson	152,750	51%	Sri Preston Kulkarni	138,153	46%	John B. McElligott	Libertarian	3,261	1%	Kellen Sweny	Independent	3,241	1%

== Personal life ==
Olson lives in Sugar Land with his wife Nancy and their two children. Since leaving Congress he has been working for Hance Scarborough LLP.

U.S. House of Representatives
Preceded by Nick Lampson	Member of the U.S. House of Representatives from Texas's 22nd congressional district 2009–2021	Succeeded by Troy Nehls
U.S. order of precedence (ceremonial)
Preceded by Ciro Rodriguez as Former U.S. Representative	Order of precedence of the United States as Former U.S. Representative	Succeeded by Tom Tauke as Former U.S. Representative
