= Ken Legler =

American politician

Texas Representative for District 144
- Preceded by: Robert Talton
- Succeeded by: Barbara Legler

Personal details
- Born: December 27, 1957
- Died: June 1, 2012 (aged 54)
- Party: Republican
- Children: 3
- Education: San Jacinto College

Ken Legler (December 27, 1957 – June 1, 2012) was an American politician who served as a member of the Texas House of Representatives from 2009 to 2012. He died of an apparent heart attack in June, 2012. His wife, Barbara Legler, succeeded him and served the remainder of his term.

== Personal life ==
Ken Legler attended San Jacinto College. Legler was the President & Owner of House Wire Works. He was also a member of the Bush Strike Force Team, Chamber of Commerce Board, National Federation of Independent Business Board, and Texas Association of Business Board. He was a Christian and attended Zion Lutheran Church, in Pasanda, Texas. He and his wife Barbara had 3 kids, Joseph, Krystina, Kathryn.
