= Kesha Rogers =

American politician (born 1976)

- Born: December 9, 1976 (age 49); Houston, Texas, U.S.
- Education: Texas State University, San; Marcos
- Political party: Independent
- Spouse: Ian Overton (2011–present)

Lakesha D. Rogers (born December 9, 1976) is an American political activist in the Lyndon LaRouche Youth Movement, a former candidate in the Democratic primary for U.S. Senate in Texas, and a two-time Democratic Party nominee for Texas's 22nd congressional district. Rogers, an African American, is a follower of Lyndon LaRouche and his LaRouche movement. She called for the impeachment of U.S. President Barack Obama.

== Personal life ==
According to her campaign biography, Kesha Rogers was born to a "lower middle class family", with her father being a minister and construction worker and her mother working for the Houston Independent School District. She graduated from Texas State University in 2001 with a degree in Political Science and Speech Communications. She has criticized "the standard institutions of higher education" as "the biggest barrier towards students wanting a real classical education", and has expressed an interest in recruiting young people to the LaRouche Youth Movement.

On November 5, 2011, Rogers married her campaign manager, Ian Overton.

== LaRouche movement ==
Rogers is an active supporter of the LaRouche Youth Movement, and has been photographed holding a LaRouche campaign sign depicting President Obama with a Hitler mustache. Rogers attacked President Obama for allegedly trying to dismantle NASA (a big employer in the Houston area), and supported impeaching him. She has also criticized Obama for supporting health care reform proposals that she argued are fascist and will kill Americans. Rogers supports "a global Glass-Steagall", a reference to a banking reform law that was passed during the Great Depression and repealed in 1999.

== 2006 Texas Democratic Party Chairman election ==
Rogers ran unsuccessfully for chair of the Texas Democratic Party in 2006.

== 2010 United States House of Representatives election ==
On March 2, 2010, Rogers ran in the Democratic primary election for the US House Texas 22nd District against two opponents, Doug Blatt and Freddy John Wieder, Jr., winning the nomination with 7,467 of 14,281 votes. The win was compared to that of surprise Senate candidate Alvin Greene.

Following Rogers' primary victory, state and national Democratic leaders kept her at arm's length. A Texas Democratic Party spokesperson assured the Houston Press that "[Rogers's] campaign will not receive a single dollar from anyone on our staff," stating that Lyndon LaRouche followers are "not Democrats." The Chairman of the Harris County Democratic Party said, "One of the things the LaRouchites are able to do is to engage young people. If she can turn out young people to vote for Democrats, all the better." He voiced the opinion that Rogers' policies would appear more mainstream were it not for her association with LaRouche, stating with Rogers that LaRouche's support for "investment in public works, separating commercial from investment banking and opposition to corporatism" were similar to the programs of Franklin D. Roosevelt.

Subsequently, the Texas Democratic Party's state executive committee passed a resolution cutting ties with Rogers. Members were not required to support her, nor was she to be recognized at party meetings or mentioned on the party website's list of candidates. The resolution cited the "illegal activities, discriminatory proclamations and thuggish behavior" of the LaRouche movement. Rogers called the decision "arrogant".

Rogers' opponent in the general election was incumbent Pete Olson, who ran unopposed in the Republican primary. A spokesman for Olson's campaign said, "You never take an election for granted, but you, perhaps, wonder whether the Democrats in this district have profoundly changed their views on the president. She didn't hide her position." Rogers lost to Olson, 29.8% to 67.5%.

During her 2010 primary campaign for U.S. Representative, Rogers accused President Obama of "pissing on John F. Kennedy's legacy" by proposing to end NASA's Constellation program. She argues that London banking interests are trying to ruin America's economy.

Her campaign slogan was "Help send me to Congress, and we can send our grandchildren to Mars!", a reference to the LaRouche movement's strong support of space travel.

== 2012 United States House of Representatives election ==
Rogers continued to work on behalf of LaRouchePAC through 2011 and 2012. She once again won the congressional primary election on May 29, 2012, campaigning on a platform of impeaching Barack Obama "for gross violations of the Constitution in the service of Wall Street imperialism," restoring the Glass-Steagall Act, and reviving NASA. Rogers received 50.7% of the vote.

After Rogers announced her candidacy for the 2012 election, on 9 February the Democratic leadership in TX-22 started a "Stop Kesha Rogers" campaign. Meetings were held on February 18, 25, and 27, and March 3. The stated reason was because Rogers still wished to have Obama impeached (both Rogers and the Democrats assumed that Obama would win the 2012 election, which assumption proved accurate). The leadership and the local Democratic blogger Charles Kuffner endorsed instead KP George. Doug Blatt was also on the ballot.

Despite this, Rogers won the Democratic nomination by 103 votes. As in 2010, she was disavowed by state and national Democratic leaders. She was frequently seen on the campaign trail singing, "Twenty-fifth Amendment now--he is nuts! Obama is nuts!" She was referring to LaRouche's call to have Obama removed from office on the grounds of insanity. She lost to Olson again, taking 32% of the vote to Olson's 64%.

== 2014 United States Senate election ==
In December 2013, Rogers filed as a candidate in the Democratic primary race for U.S. Senate in Texas. In the March 4, 2014 primary election, she came in second in a field of five candidates, advancing to the May 27 run-off election where she lost to dentist David Alameel. Among the items on her campaign platform were opposition to fracking, support for single-payer health care, restoration of the Glass-Steagall Act, and other familiar themes from her earlier campaigns.
