= Texas's 22nd congressional district =

U.S. House district for Texas

Coordinates: 29°30′39″N 95°40′39″W

- Interactive map of district boundaries
- Representative: Troy Nehls; R–Richmond
- Distribution: 93.09% urban; 6.91% rural
- Population (2025): 944,258
- Median household income: $116,888
- Ethnicity: 42.3% White; 28.3% Hispanic; 14.1% Asian; 11.2% Black; 3.4% Two or more races; 0.7% other
- Cook PVI: R+9

Texas's 22nd congressional district of the United States House of Representatives covers a largely suburban southwestern portion of the Greater Houston metropolitan area. The district includes most of Fort Bend County, including most of the cities of Sugar Land, Rosenberg, Needville and the county seat of Richmond as well as the county's share of the largely unincorporated Greater Katy area west of Houston. In addition, the district also contains portions of northern Brazoria County, including most of Pearland and Alvin and all of Wharton and Matagorda counties, as well as a small portion of western Harris County centered on most of that county's share of the Greater Katy area.

The district is represented by Republican Troy Nehls, who was elected in 2020 over two-time challenger Democrat Sri Preston Kulkarni. From 2009-2021 Texas's 22nd Congressional District was represented by Pete Olson. From 1985 until 2006 the district was represented by former House Majority Leader Tom DeLay and before that, former Congressman and three-time presidential candidate Ron Paul briefly in 1976 and again from 1979 to 1985.

The Cook Partisan Voting Index, which derives its data from the two most recent presidential elections, gave the district a R+10 lean compared to the national average until its 2021 review, when it was lowered to R+4 before redistricting. The district is currently rated R+9.

== History ==
The district was originally created in 1958, replacing the abolished at-large district represented by Democrat Martin Dies, Jr. from 1953 to 1959. At the time, all of Texas's 254 counties had representation by one collective member of Congress. The new district was placed in Harris County, home to the city of Houston and previously represented in its entirely by Democrat Albert Thomas in the state's 8th congressional district, making Harris the first county in Texas since World War II to be divided into more than one congressional district.

The new 22nd district, largely made up of suburban territory outside of Houston along with southern portions of the city itself, was won by Democrat Robert R. Casey, a former Harris County Judge (a post equivalent to that of a county executive in Texas). The 8th and 22nd districts were separated by a boundary consisting roughly of what is now U.S. 290, the western and southern portions of Loop 610, and the portion of Buffalo Bayou east of downtown Houston including the Houston Ship Channel. All points south of this boundary were in the 22nd, while the remainder was in the 8th. These boundaries would remain effective until the 1964 elections.

After a federal court in Houston ruled Texas' congressional redistricting practices as unconstitutional in Bush v. Martin, effective with the 1966 elections, Harris County was split between three congressional districts. In addition to the existing 8th and 22nd districts, a new 7th district was created on the west side of Houston and Harris County. The new 7th would elect former Harris County Republican Party chairman (and future President) George H. W. Bush, while Casey's 22nd district was made the most compact of the three, stretching from southwest Houston to southeast Harris County, including Pasadena and Clear Lake City, and also encompassing the Johnson Space Center.

=== 1970 redistricting ===
Following the 1970 census, the 22nd lost some largely African-American portions to the newly realigned, majority African-American 18th district (which would elect Democrat Barbara Jordan), while other areas along the Houston Ship Channel went to the 8th district, now represented by Democrat Bob Eckhardt and primarily concentrated in north Houston.

Those areas were replaced by portions of rapidly growing Fort Bend and Brazoria counties, home to growing Republican constituencies of white upper-middle-class families — natives and transplants alike — moving to jobs in Houston's growing energy sector, as well as at the Johnson Space Center and the Texas Medical Center, and drawn to affordable housing and top-rated schools in the area's burgeoning master-planned communities. A mid-decade redistricting in 1974 added southern Waller County, with a similar character to Fort Bend and Brazoria. As with most growing exurban areas in the Southern United States, these new areas also had large blocs of conservative white Democrats disenchanted with their party's support for restoration of civil rights promoted by the administration of Lyndon B. Johnson and the national Democratic Party. While Casey continued to win reelection in 1972 and 1974 without significant opposition, his resignation following his appointment to the Federal Maritime Commission in 1976, combined with increased suburban growth in the aforementioned counties, opened the door for a Republican upset in the special election that followed.

Three months after Casey's resignation, on April 3, 1976, Republican Ron Paul, a physician and Air Force veteran who had moved from the Pittsburgh area in the previous decade with his wife and settled in Brazoria County, won a special election to fill the remainder of Casey's unexpired term. Paul had been Casey's Republican opponent in 1974. While Paul lost the general election later that year to Democratic State Senator Bob Gammage by fewer than 300 votes, in 1978 he defeated Gammage in a general election rematch by a 1,200-vote margin, coinciding with the election of Bill Clements as Texas's first Republican Governor since Reconstruction. In 1980, Paul would go on to win a second term, defeating Democratic attorney Mike Andrews, a former Harris County prosecutor, by a narrow margin.

=== 1980 redistricting ===
Following the 1980 census, rapid growth in the Houston area resulted in most of the more Democratic areas of the 22nd being transferred to the new 25th congressional district, which Mike Andrews won in 1982 and would hold for six terms before pursuing an unsuccessful run for the Democratic nomination for U.S. Senate in 1994.

The redistricting left Paul with a district comprising three major portions, all of which were strongly Republican. These included:

- all of Fort Bend County, by this time a booming suburban county anchored by the development of the First Colony master-planned community in Sugar Land, and also containing other booming suburbs including Missouri City, Stafford and Rosenberg.
- much of Paul's political base in Brazoria County, except for a tiny western portion around the communities of Sweeny and West Columbia located in the adjacent 14th district; and
- most of southwest Houston and Harris County along the Southwest Freeway, including the Westwood, Sharpstown and Fondren areas of Houston. This portion also included the Richmond Avenue entertainment corridor, The Galleria and the adjacent Transco Tower, the inner suburbs of Bellaire and West University Place, Houston Baptist University, and Greenway Plaza including The Summit (then the home of the NBA's Houston Rockets). Much of the area's retail activity, centered on the aforementioned Galleria as well as the Sharpstown and Westwood malls, along with most of southwest Houston's automotive dealerships (some of them among the top dealers in the nation), was also concentrated in the Harris County portion of the district and extended as far south as Stafford (then home to a major manufacturing facility for Texas Instruments).

This configuration would remain in effect for the remainder of the 1980s, including the first four terms of Republican Tom DeLay's tenure, as Paul unsuccessfully sought the Republican nomination for the United States Senate in 1984 against eventual winner Phil Gramm. DeLay served as chairman of the conservative Republican Study Committee and became a Republican whip while representing this configuration of the district.

=== 1990 redistricting ===
After the 1990 census, the 22nd remained largely unchanged. It covered all of Fort Bend County, all of Brazoria County save for its western and southern edges, and a small portion of southwest Houston around the Alief, Westchase and Sharpstown areas. The district was further reconfigured after the 2000 census, taking effect after the 2002 elections, when DeLay was re-elected and became House Majority Leader. The district lost Fort Bend County's share of Houston, but picked up a large slice of southeast Harris County, including portions of Clear Lake City, Pasadena, La Porte, Deer Park and Seabrook.

=== 2000 and 2003 redistricting ===
In 2003, following the Republican takeover of the Texas House of Representatives, the Texas Legislature engineered a mid-decade redistricting. The 22nd lost its share of Brazoria County except for Pearland, as well as communities on Fort Bend County's northern and western edges, to the 14th district. That district was now represented by Paul, who was elected and returned to Congress in 1997 after a 12-year absence. The 22nd district now included Pearland, almost all of southeast Harris County, including the Johnson Space Center, and a largely working-class western portion of Galveston County, including Santa Fe and La Marque, in addition to much of DeLay's political base in Sugar Land, Missouri City, Rosenberg and surrounding areas. The district would remain unchanged through the rest of the decade, but changed its incumbent three times after Tom DeLay resigned on June 9, 2006 in the wake of corruption allegations related to the 2003 redistricting.

As the result of a special election on November 7, 2006 to fill DeLay's vacant congressional seat, Republican Shelley Sekula-Gibbs filled the remainder of DeLay's term in late 2006, having lost the general election to Democrat Nick Lampson in a bizarre set of circumstances. Lampson had previously represented Texas's 9th congressional district, based in Beaumont and Galveston, before the 2003 redistricting resulted in that district being renumbered as the 2nd district and pushed into heavily Republican northern Houston. Lampson was defeated in the 2004 election by Republican Harris County district court judge Ted Poe. Ahead of the 2006 election, Lampson moved to Stafford, where his grandparents had settled after they immigrated from Italy. Additionally, the 22nd included a large slice of his former base; he'd previously represented much of the Galveston County portion of the district, as well as the area around the Johnson Space Center. Lampson benefited from Sekula-Gibbs being forced to run a write-in campaign, as DeLay had resigned one month after winning a contentious Republican primary against three challengers (one of whom won over 20 percent of the vote, but not enough to overcome DeLay's vote of over 60 percent). After just one term and despite a vigorous campaign, Lampson lost the seat to Republican Pete Olson in 2008. The district reverted to form, with Olson winning the district in 2010 by a double-digit margin.

=== 2010 redistricting ===
Following the 2010 census and resulting redistricting, the district included most of Fort Bend County, save for most of the communities of Stafford, Mission Bend, Fresno, northern Missouri City and the Fort Bend Houston "super neighborhood" in far southwest Houston. Also within the district were northern parts of Brazoria County, including Pearland and Alvin, and portions of southeast Houston and Harris County running along Interstate 45 south of the Sam Houston Tollway. The affluent residents of the district tended to vote strongly Republican with an average median household income of $82,899 as of the 2012 American Community Survey, making it the wealthiest congressional district in Texas and also a diverse district with sizable minority constituencies, who are educated and of the professional class. Mitt Romney won the district with 62% of the vote in 2012, with Republicans holding the overwhelming majority of elected offices in the district, which also voted for Donald Trump in 2016 despite Hillary Clinton becoming the first Democrat to carry Fort Bend County since 1964. The suddenly competitive nature of the district, in part due to Trump's populist economic stances and especially his campaign and presidential rhetoric, resulted in Olson narrowly winning a sixth term in a surprisingly close race against Democrat Sri Preston Kulkarni fueled by Democratic coattails (mostly involving straight ticket voting) from the Senate campaign of Beto O'Rourke, who won Fort Bend County and narrowly lost the 22nd district in his unsuccessful, but close bid against incumbent Republican Senator Ted Cruz. Olson retired after six terms, and Fort Bend County Sheriff Troy Nehls won another close race against Kulkarni.

=== 2020 redistricting ===
Due to Fort Bend County's recent status as a classic suburban "swing county" in state and national politics, as well as Democratic gains at the local level in the 2018 elections, many observers speculated that the district was poised to flip in future elections without drastic alterations. Indeed, following the 2020 census, the district was redrawn again and extended southward into heavily Republican Wharton and Matagorda counties, as well as northward into a western corner of Harris County centered on most of the county's share of the Greater Katy area and all of the city of Katy itself, save for its portion in Waller County. Several of Fort Bend and Brazoria counties' more Democratic portions in the 22nd were moved to nearby districts held by Democrats, including a largely Asian-American portion of Sugar Land in the former that was moved to the 7th District of Lizzie Fletcher and the largely diverse and Democratic west side of Pearland in the latter that was transferred to the 9th District of Al Green. This would leave the bulk of the new 22nd to be anchored in most of Sugar Land, Richmond, Rosenberg, Needville and the Greater Katy area in Fort Bend County and most of Pearland, Manvel and Alvin in Brazoria County; Nehls would easily win reelection to a second term in 2022 against a nominal Democratic challenger.

Democratic strength is largely concentrated in scattered majority Hispanic and Black precincts in these aforementioned cities that tend to vote Democratic; many of these precincts have largely tended to vote Democratic by margins of 50-60 percent or better. But these voting blocs are outnumbered by large blocs of suburban Republican voters in much of the district, including groups of moderate-leaning ethnic Asian voters centered on Sugar Land, along with some conservative-leaning Hispanic and African-American voters in more affluent parts of the district. While many of these suburban areas have trended Democratic in recent years due to backlash over Trump's campaign style and economic populism, not unlike the situation with many other similar districts of its kind in the Trump era, the district is not expected to be a target of House Democrats for the foreseeable future.

=== Demographics ===
According to the APM Research Lab's Voter Profile Tools (featuring the U.S. Census Bureau's 2019 American Community Survey), the district contained about 611,000 potential voters (citizens, age 18+). Of these, 54% are White, 23% Latino, 16% Black, and 16% Asian. Immigrants make up 22% of the district's potential voters. Median income among households (with one or more potential voter) is about $102,500. As for the educational attainment of potential voters in the district, 42% hold a bachelor's or higher degree.

== Recent election results from statewide races ==
=== 2023–2027 boundaries ===
Year	Office	Results
2008	President	McCain 66% - 33%
2012	President	Romney 70% - 30%
2014	Senate	Cornyn 75% - 25%
2014	Governor	Abbott 71% - 29%
2016	President	Trump 60% - 36%
2018	Senate	Cruz 58% - 41%
2018	Governor	Abbott 63% - 35%
2018	Lt. Governor	Patrick 59% - 39%
2018	Attorney General	Paxton 58% - 40%
2018	Comptroller of Public Accounts	Hegar 62% - 36%
2020	President	Trump 57% - 41%
2020	Senate	Cornyn 59% - 38%
2022	Governor	Abbott 59% - 39%
2022	Lt. Governor	Patrick 59% - 39%
2022	Attorney General	Paxton 59% - 39%
2022	Comptroller of Public Accounts	Hegar 62% - 36%
2024	President	Trump 59% - 39%
2024	Senate	Cruz 56% - 42%

=== 2027–2033 boundaries ===
Year	Office	Results
2008	President	McCain 67% - 33%
2012	President	Romney 71% - 29%
2014	Senate	Cornyn 76% - 24%
2014	Governor	Abbott 72% - 28%
2016	President	Trump 60% - 35%
2018	Senate	Cruz 59% - 40%
2018	Governor	Abbott 64% - 35%
2018	Lt. Governor	Patrick 60% - 38%
2018	Attorney General	Paxton 59% - 39%
2018	Comptroller of Public Accounts	Hegar 62% - 35%
2020	President	Trump 58% - 41%
2020	Senate	Cornyn 60% - 38%
2022	Governor	Abbott 61% - 38%
2022	Lt. Governor	Patrick 60% - 38%
2022	Attorney General	Paxton 60% - 37%
2022	Comptroller of Public Accounts	Hegar 63% - 35%
2024	President	Trump 60% - 38%
2024	Senate	Cruz 57% - 40%
2026	Senate	Talarico 51% - 46%
2026	Governor	Abbott 49–48%

== Current composition ==
For the 118th and successive Congresses (based on redistricting following the 2020 census), the district contains all or portions of the following counties and communities:

Brazoria County (7)

Alvin (part; also 14th), Brookside Village, Iowa Colony (part; also 9th), Manvel (part; also 9th), Pearland (part; also 9th; shared with Fort Bend and Harris counties), Rosharon, Sandy Point

Fort Bend County (22)

Arcola (part; also 9th), Beasley, Cinco Ranch (shared with Harris County), Cumings, Fairchilds, Fulshear, Houston (part; also 2nd, 7th, 8th, 9th, 18th, 29th, 36th, 38th; shared with Harris and Montgomery counties), Katy (part; also 8th and 10th; shared with Harris and Waller counties), Kendleton, Meadows Place, Missouri City (part; also 9th), Needville, Orchard, Pecan Grove, Pleak, Richmond (part; also 7th), Rosenberg, Sienna (part; also 9th), Simonton, Sugar Land (part; also 7th), Thompsons, Weston Lakes

Harris County (3)

Cinco Ranch (shared with Fort Bend County), Houston (part; also 2nd, 7th, 8th, 9th, 18th, 29th, 36th, 38th; shared with Fort Bend and Montgomery counties), Katy (part; also 8th and 10th; shared with Fort Bend and Waller counties),

Matagorda County (9)

All 9 communities

Wharton County (7)

All 7 communities

== Future composition ==
Beginning with the 2026 election, the 22nd district will consist of the following counties:

- Brazoria (part)
- Fort Bend (part)
- Harris (part)

== List of members representing the district ==
Member	Party	Years	Cong ress	Electoral history	District location
District established January 3, 1959
Robert R. Casey (Houston)	Democratic	January 3, 1959 – January 22, 1976	86th 87th 88th 89th 90th 91st 92nd 93rd 94th	Elected in 1958. Re-elected in 1960. Re-elected in 1962. Re-elected in 1964. Re-elected in 1966. Re-elected in 1968. Re-elected in 1970. Re-elected in 1972. Re-elected in 1974. Resigned when appointed to the Federal Maritime Commission.	1959–1967 [data missing]
Robert R. Casey (Houston)	Democratic	January 3, 1959 – January 22, 1976	86th 87th 88th 89th 90th 91st 92nd 93rd 94th	Elected in 1958. Re-elected in 1960. Re-elected in 1962. Re-elected in 1964. Re-elected in 1966. Re-elected in 1968. Re-elected in 1970. Re-elected in 1972. Re-elected in 1974. Resigned when appointed to the Federal Maritime Commission.	1967–1969 [data missing]
Robert R. Casey (Houston)	Democratic	January 3, 1959 – January 22, 1976	86th 87th 88th 89th 90th 91st 92nd 93rd 94th	Elected in 1958. Re-elected in 1960. Re-elected in 1962. Re-elected in 1964. Re-elected in 1966. Re-elected in 1968. Re-elected in 1970. Re-elected in 1972. Re-elected in 1974. Resigned when appointed to the Federal Maritime Commission.	1969–1973 [data missing]
Robert R. Casey (Houston)	Democratic	January 3, 1959 – January 22, 1976	86th 87th 88th 89th 90th 91st 92nd 93rd 94th	Elected in 1958. Re-elected in 1960. Re-elected in 1962. Re-elected in 1964. Re-elected in 1966. Re-elected in 1968. Re-elected in 1970. Re-elected in 1972. Re-elected in 1974. Resigned when appointed to the Federal Maritime Commission.	1973–1975 [data missing]
Robert R. Casey (Houston)	Democratic	January 3, 1959 – January 22, 1976	86th 87th 88th 89th 90th 91st 92nd 93rd 94th	Elected in 1958. Re-elected in 1960. Re-elected in 1962. Re-elected in 1964. Re-elected in 1966. Re-elected in 1968. Re-elected in 1970. Re-elected in 1972. Re-elected in 1974. Resigned when appointed to the Federal Maritime Commission.	1975–1983 [data missing]
Vacant		January 22, 1976 – April 3, 1976	94th		1975–1983 [data missing]
Ron Paul (Lake Jackson)	Republican	April 3, 1976 – January 3, 1977	94th	Elected to finish Casey's term. Lost re-election.	1975–1983 [data missing]
Robert Gammage (Houston)	Democratic	January 3, 1977 – January 3, 1979	95th	Elected in 1976. Lost re-election.	1975–1983 [data missing]
Ron Paul (Lake Jackson)	Republican	January 3, 1979 – January 3, 1985	96th 97th 98th	Elected again in 1978. Re-elected in 1980. Re-elected in 1982. Retired to run for U.S. Senator.	1975–1983 [data missing]
Ron Paul (Lake Jackson)	Republican	January 3, 1979 – January 3, 1985	96th 97th 98th	Elected again in 1978. Re-elected in 1980. Re-elected in 1982. Retired to run for U.S. Senator.	1983–1985 [data missing]
Tom DeLay (Sugar Land)	Republican	January 3, 1985 – June 9, 2006	99th 100th 101st 102nd 103rd 104th 105th 106th 107th 108th 109th	Elected in 1984. Re-elected in 1986. Re-elected in 1988. Re-elected in 1990. Re-elected in 1992. Re-elected in 1994. Re-elected in 1996. Re-elected in 1998. Re-elected in 2000. Re-elected in 2002. Re-elected in 2004. Ran for re-election, but resigned.	1985–1993 [data missing]
Tom DeLay (Sugar Land)	Republican	January 3, 1985 – June 9, 2006	99th 100th 101st 102nd 103rd 104th 105th 106th 107th 108th 109th	Elected in 1984. Re-elected in 1986. Re-elected in 1988. Re-elected in 1990. Re-elected in 1992. Re-elected in 1994. Re-elected in 1996. Re-elected in 1998. Re-elected in 2000. Re-elected in 2002. Re-elected in 2004. Ran for re-election, but resigned.	1993–1997; Parts of Brazoria, Fort Bend, and Harris
Tom DeLay (Sugar Land)	Republican	January 3, 1985 – June 9, 2006	99th 100th 101st 102nd 103rd 104th 105th 106th 107th 108th 109th	Elected in 1984. Re-elected in 1986. Re-elected in 1988. Re-elected in 1990. Re-elected in 1992. Re-elected in 1994. Re-elected in 1996. Re-elected in 1998. Re-elected in 2000. Re-elected in 2002. Re-elected in 2004. Ran for re-election, but resigned.	1997–2003; Parts of Brazoria, Fort Bend, and Harris
Tom DeLay (Sugar Land)	Republican	January 3, 1985 – June 9, 2006	99th 100th 101st 102nd 103rd 104th 105th 106th 107th 108th 109th	Elected in 1984. Re-elected in 1986. Re-elected in 1988. Re-elected in 1990. Re-elected in 1992. Re-elected in 1994. Re-elected in 1996. Re-elected in 1998. Re-elected in 2000. Re-elected in 2002. Re-elected in 2004. Ran for re-election, but resigned.	2003–2005; Parts of Brazoria, Fort Bend, and Harris
Tom DeLay (Sugar Land)	Republican	January 3, 1985 – June 9, 2006	99th 100th 101st 102nd 103rd 104th 105th 106th 107th 108th 109th	Elected in 1984. Re-elected in 1986. Re-elected in 1988. Re-elected in 1990. Re-elected in 1992. Re-elected in 1994. Re-elected in 1996. Re-elected in 1998. Re-elected in 2000. Re-elected in 2002. Re-elected in 2004. Ran for re-election, but resigned.	2005–2013 Parts of Brazoria, Fort Bend, Galveston, and Harris
Vacant		June 9, 2006 – November 13, 2006	109th		2005–2013 Parts of Brazoria, Fort Bend, Galveston, and Harris
Shelley Sekula-Gibbs (Houston)	Republican	November 13, 2006 – January 3, 2007	109th	Elected to finish DeLay's term. Lost election to full term.	2005–2013 Parts of Brazoria, Fort Bend, Galveston, and Harris
Nick Lampson (Stafford)	Democratic	January 3, 2007 – January 3, 2009	110th	Elected in 2006. Lost re-election.	2005–2013 Parts of Brazoria, Fort Bend, Galveston, and Harris
Pete Olson (Sugar Land)	Republican	January 3, 2009 – January 3, 2021	111th 112th 113th 114th 115th 116th	Elected in 2008. Re-elected in 2010. Re-elected in 2012. Re-elected in 2014. Re-elected in 2016. Re-elected in 2018. Retired.	2005–2013 Parts of Brazoria, Fort Bend, Galveston, and Harris
Pete Olson (Sugar Land)	Republican	January 3, 2009 – January 3, 2021	111th 112th 113th 114th 115th 116th	Elected in 2008. Re-elected in 2010. Re-elected in 2012. Re-elected in 2014. Re-elected in 2016. Re-elected in 2018. Retired.	2013–2023 Parts of Brazoria, Fort Bend, and Harris
Troy Nehls (Richmond)	Republican	January 3, 2021 – present	117th 118th 119th	Elected in 2020. Re-elected in 2022. Re-elected in 2024. Retiring at the end of term.	2013–2023 Parts of Brazoria, Fort Bend, and Harris
Troy Nehls (Richmond)	Republican	January 3, 2021 – present	117th 118th 119th	Elected in 2020. Re-elected in 2022. Re-elected in 2024. Retiring at the end of term.	2023–2027 Brazoria (part), Fort Bend (part), Harris (part), Matagorda, Wharton
Trever Nehls (Richmond)	Republican	Assuming office on January 3, 2027		Elected in 2026.	

== Recent elections ==
=== 1974 ===
Incumbent Democrat Robert R. Casey defeated ob/gyn Ron Paul, a delegate to the Texas Republican convention; Democrats won 1974 heavily.

=== 1976 special ===
After President Gerald Ford appointed Casey to head the Federal Maritime Commission, Paul won a 1976 special election against Democrat Robert Gammage to fill the empty seat; Paul was sworn in on April 3. Paul had decided to enter politics on August 15, 1971, when President Richard Nixon closed the "gold window" by implementing the U.S. dollar's complete departure from the gold standard.

Paul was the first Republican elected from the area since Reconstruction, and the first from the state since Bill Guill was elected from the 14th congressional district in 1950. He led the Texas Reagan delegation at the national Republican convention. His successful campaign against Gammage surprised local Democrats, who had expected to retain the seat easily following the Watergate scandal of President Richard Nixon. Gammage underestimated Paul's support among local women.

=== 1976 general ===
Gammage narrowly defeated Paul some months later in the general election, by fewer than 300 votes (0.2%).

=== 1978 ===
Paul defeated Gammage in a 1978 rematch. Paul would go on to win the 1980 and 1982 elections as well.

=== 1984 ===
In 1984, Paul chose to run for the U.S. Senate instead of re-election to the House. He was succeeded by former state representative and Republican Tom DeLay. DeLay would go on to win re-election from 1986 through 2004.

=== 2004 ===
Texas's 22nd congressional district, 2004
Party	Candidate	Votes	%
Republican	Tom DeLay (incumbent)	150,386	55.2
Democratic	Richard Morrison	112,034	41.1
Independent	Michael Fjetland	5,314	1.9
Libertarian	Tom Morrison	4,886	1.8
Total votes		272,620	100

=== 2006 special ===
On January 2, 2006, Nick Lampson, a Jefferson County tax assessor-collector, filed as a Democrat to challenge incumbent Tom DeLay for the 2006 general election. Lampson had represented the adjacent ninth district until DeLay engineered the 2003 Texas redistricting, after which Lampson lost his seat to Republican Ted Poe in 2004.

DeLay won the Republican primary on March 7, 2006, taking 62% of the vote in the four-way race. It was DeLay's weakest showing in a primary election, which prompted doubts about whether he could win the general election. On April 3, 2006, three days after his former aide Tony Rudy pleaded guilty to various charges of corruption relating to the Jack Abramoff scandal, DeLay announced that he would withdraw from the race.

Under Texas law, it was too late for the Republican Party to select another candidate for the ballot of the 2006 general election. DeLay announced on August 8, 2006 that he would withdraw in order to allow the party to organize a campaign for a write-in candidate. Texas Governor Rick Perry announced on August 29, 2006 that a special election would take place for the remainder of DeLay's term (November 2006 to January 2007).

The Texas Republican Party supported Houston City Councilwoman Shelley Sekula-Gibbs as their write-in candidate. Lampson chose not to run in the special election. Sekula-Gibbs won and was sworn in on November 13, 2006. She represented the district for the remaining few weeks of the 109th United States Congress. Sekula-Gibbs promised to fix health care, taxes, and immigration.

=== 2006 general ===
Due to DeLay's late announcement, no Republican was listed on the ballot for the two-year term that began in January 2007.

The special election was held concurrently with the general election on November 7, 2006. Voters cast votes twice on that date, once for the special election, once for the general election. This arrangement ensured that Sekula-Gibbs's name appeared on a November 7 ballot. Nonetheless, Lampson won the general election and was sworn in on January 4, 2007.

Texas's 22nd congressional district, 2006
Party	Candidate	Votes	%
Democratic	Nick Lampson	71,122	50.8
Republican	Shelley Sekula-Gibbs (write-in)	59,914	42.8
Libertarian	Bob Smither	8,482	6.1
Republican	Don Richardson (write-in)	408	0.3
Independent	Joe Reasbeck (write-in)	86	0.1
Total votes		140,012	100

=== 2008 ===
Democratic incumbent Nick Lampson sought re-election. The Republican primary was highly competitive, as Lampson's prior victory was seen as the result of Republicans being forced to run a write-in campaign. Former incumbent Shelley Sekula-Gibbs, former Navy pilot and former Senate liaison officer Pete Olson, state representative Robert Talton, former councilman and mayor of Pasadena John Manlove, and former councilman and mayor of Sugar Land Dean Hrbacek all competed in the primary. No candidate won the primary outright, leading to a run-off campaign between the top two finishers, Sekula-Gibbs and Olson. Olson won the run-off and the nomination.

Olson and Lampson faced each other in the November 4, 2008 general election, along with Libertarian candidate, Vietnam veteran, retired businessman, and community volunteer John Wieder. Olson won the election and was sworn into office in January 2009.

Republican primary results
Party	Candidate	Votes	%
Republican	Shelley Sekula-Gibbs	16,697	29.73
Republican	Pete Olson	11,634	20.71
Republican	John Manlove	8,399	14.95
Republican	Robert Talton	8,169	14.54
Republican	Dean Hrbacek	5,864	10.44
Republican	Cynthia Dunbar	2,116	3.77
Republican	Brian Klock	992	1.77
Republican	Jim Squier	989	1.76
Republican	Kevyn Bazzy	880	1.57
Republican	Ryan Rowley	424	0.75
Total votes		56,164	100.0

Republican run-off results
Party	Candidate	Votes	%
Republican	Pete Olson	15,511	68.52
Republican	Shelley Sekula-Gibbs	7,125	31.48
Total votes		22,636	100.0

Texas's 22nd congressional district, 2008
Party	Candidate	Votes	%
Republican	Pete Olson	161,996	52.4
Democratic	Nick Lampson (incumbent)	140,160	45.4
Libertarian	John Wieder	6,839	2.2
Total votes		308,995	100.0

=== 2010 ===
Republican incumbent Pete Olson sought re-election and defeated Democrat Kesha Rogers, a LaRouche Movement supporter, in the general election on November 2, 2010.

Texas's 22nd congressional district, 2010
Party	Candidate	Votes	%
Republican	Pete Olson (incumbent)	140,537	67.5
Democratic	Kesha Rogers	62,082	29.8
Libertarian	Steven Susman	5,538	2.2
Write-In	Johnny Williams	66	0
Total votes		208,223	100.0

=== 2012 ===
Two-term Republican incumbent Pete Olson sought re-election. He was challenged in the primary by conservative newspaper columnist Barbara Carlson, winning 76 percent of the vote.

Kesha Rogers, a political activist with ties to the Lyndon LaRouche movement and the 2010 Democratic nominee, narrowly won the Democratic Party's nomination by 103 votes. Rogers was disavowed by some local Democrats for her controversial platform, which included impeaching President Barack Obama and colonizing outer space.

Steven Susman again ran as the Libertarian candidate, and Don Cook ran as the Green Party candidate. Olson won the general election with 64% of the vote.

Texas's 22nd congressional district, 2012
Party	Candidate	Votes	%
Republican	Pete Olson (incumbent)	160,668	64.03
Democratic	Kesha Rogers	80,203	31.96
Libertarian	Steven Susman	5,986	2.39
Green	Don Cook	4,054	1.62
Total votes		250,911	100

=== 2014 ===
Three-term incumbent Republican Pete Olson sought re-election. Frank Briscoe and Mark Gibson ran for the Democratic Party's nomination; Briscoe won the primary. Libertarian Rob Lapham competed with Olson and Briscoe in the general election. Olson was re-elected with 66.55% of the vote.

Democratic primary
Party	Candidate	Votes	%
Democratic	Frank Briscoe	3,378	53.18
Democratic	Mark Gibson	2,973	46.81
Total votes		6,351	100

Republican primary
Party	Candidate	Votes	%
Republican	Pete Olson (incumbent)	33,167	100

Texas's 22nd congressional district, 2014
Party	Candidate	Votes	%
Republican	Pete Olson (incumbent)	100,861	66.55
Democratic	Frank Briscoe	47,844	31.57
Libertarian	Rob Lapham	2,861	1.89
Total votes		151,566	100

=== 2016 ===
Four-term incumbent Republican Pete Olson sought re-election. In the Democratic primary, Mark Gibson, who lost in the primary in 2014, and A. R. Hassan competed for the party's nomination; Gibson won the nomination with 76.16% of the vote. Olson was re-elected with 59.52% of the vote in the general election.

Democratic primary
Party	Candidate	Votes	%
Democratic	Mark Gibson	23,084	76.16
Democratic	A. R. Hassan	7,226	23.84
Total votes		30,310	100

Republican primary
Party	Candidate	Votes	%
Republican	Pete Olson (incumbent)	73,375	100
Total votes		73,375	100

Texas's 22nd congressional district, 2016
Party	Candidate	Votes	%
Republican	Pete Olson (incumbent)	181,864	59.52
Democratic	Mark Gibson	123,679	40.48
Total votes		305,543	100

=== 2018 ===
Five-term incumbent Republican Pete Olson sought re-election. In the Democratic primary, several candidates competed for the nomination, including former diplomat Sri Preston Kulkarni, dentist Letitia Plummer, and 2016 nominee Mark Gibson. No candidate won the Democratic nomination outright, leading to a run-off election between the top two finishers, Kulkarni and Plummer. Kulkarni won the run-off with 62% of the vote, and faced Olson, Libertarian John McElligott, and independent candidate Sara Kellen Sweney in the general election. Olson won the general election with 51.4% of the vote, his closest-ever victory.

Republican primary results
Party	Candidate	Votes	%
Republican	Pete Olson (incumbent)	35,782	78.4
Republican	Danny Nguyen	6,170	13.5
Republican	James Green	2,521	5.5
Republican	Eric Zmrhal	1,174	2.6
Total votes		45,647	100

Democratic primary results
Party	Candidate	Votes	%
Democratic	Sri Preston Kulkarni	9,466	31.8
Democratic	Letitia Plummer	7,230	24.3
Democratic	Steve Brown	6,246	21.0
Democratic	Margarita Ruiz Johnson	3,767	12.7
Democratic	Mark Gibson	3,046	10.2
Total votes		29,755	100

Democratic primary run-off
Party	Candidate	Votes	%
Democratic	Sri Preston Kulkarni	9.517	62.11
Democratic	Letitia Plummer	5,805	37.89
Total votes		15,322	100.0

Texas's 22nd congressional district, 2018
Party	Candidate	Votes	%
Republican	Pete Olson (incumbent)	152,750	51.4
Democratic	Sri Preston Kulkarni	138,153	46.4
Libertarian	John McElligott	3,261	1.1
Independent	Kellen Sweny	3,241	1.1
Total votes		297,405	100

=== 2020 ===
Six-term incumbent Republican Pete Olson announced he would not seek re-election in 2020, opening up a competitive contest for both major parties. On the Democratic side, 2018 nominee Sri Preston Kulkarni won the nomination again in the March 3 primary, while on the Republican side a large number of candidates ran, including Fort Bend County Sheriff Troy Nehls, GOP donor Kathaleen Wall, and Pierce Bush, a member of the Bush family. No candidate won the Republican primary outright, initiating a run-off contest between the top two finishers, Troy Nehls and Kathaleen Wall. Nehls defeated Wall in the July 14 run-off to win the nomination. Nehls defeated Kulkarni in the November election for the seat, which also featured Libertarian candidate Joseph LeBlanc Jr.

Democratic primary
Party	Candidate	Votes	%
Democratic	Sri Preston Kulkarni	34,664	53.07
Democratic	Derrick A. Reed	16,126	24.69
Democratic	Nyanza Davis Moore	9,449	14.47
Democratic	Carmine Petrillo III	5,074	7.77
Total votes		65,313	100.0

Republican primary
Party	Candidate	Votes	%
Republican	Troy Nehls	29,538	40.5
Republican	Kathaleen Wall	14,201	19.4
Republican	Pierce Bush	11,281	15.4
Republican	Greg Hill	10,315	14.1
Republican	Dan Mathews	2,165	3.0
Republican	Bangar Reddy	1,144	1.6
Republican	Joe Walz	1,039	1.4
Republican	Shandon Phan	773	1.1
Republican	Diana Miller	771	1.0
Republican	Jon Camarillo	718	1.0
Republican	Douglas Haggard	398	0.5
Republican	Howard Steele	283	0.4
Republican	Matt Hinton	274	0.4
Republican	Brandon T. Penko	96	0.1
Republican	Aaron Hermes	92	0.1
Total votes		73,133	100.0

Republican run-off
Party	Candidate	Votes	%
Republican	Troy Nehls	36,132	69.92
Republican	Kathaleen Wall	15,547	30.08
Total votes		51,679	100.0

Texas's 22nd congressional district, 2020
Party	Candidate	Votes	%
Republican	Troy Nehls	204,537	51.7
Democratic	Sri Preston Kulkarni	175,738	44.4
Libertarian	Joseph LeBlanc Jr.	15,452	3.9
Total votes			100.0

=== 2022 ===
Democratic primary results
Party	Candidate	Votes	%
Democratic	Jamie Kaye Jordan	20,818	100.0
Total votes		20,818	100.0

Republican primary results
Party	Candidate	Votes	%
Republican	Troy Nehls (incumbent)	50,281	87.2
Republican	Gregory Thorne	7,378	12.8
Total votes		57,659	100.0

Texas's 22nd congressional district, 2022
Party	Candidate	Votes	%
Republican	Troy Nehls (incumbent)	150,014	62.19
Democratic	Jamie Kaye Jordan	85,653	35.51
Libertarian	Joseph LeBlanc	5,378	2.23
Write-in	Jim Squires	170	0.07
Total votes		241,215	100.0

=== 2024 ===
2024 Texas's 22nd congressional district election
Party	Candidate	Votes	%
Republican	Troy Nehls (incumbent)	209,285	62.12
Democratic	Marquette Greene-Scott	127,604	37.88
Total votes		336,889	100.00
Republican hold			

== See also ==
- List of United States congressional districts
