= Troy Nehls =

American politician (born 1968)

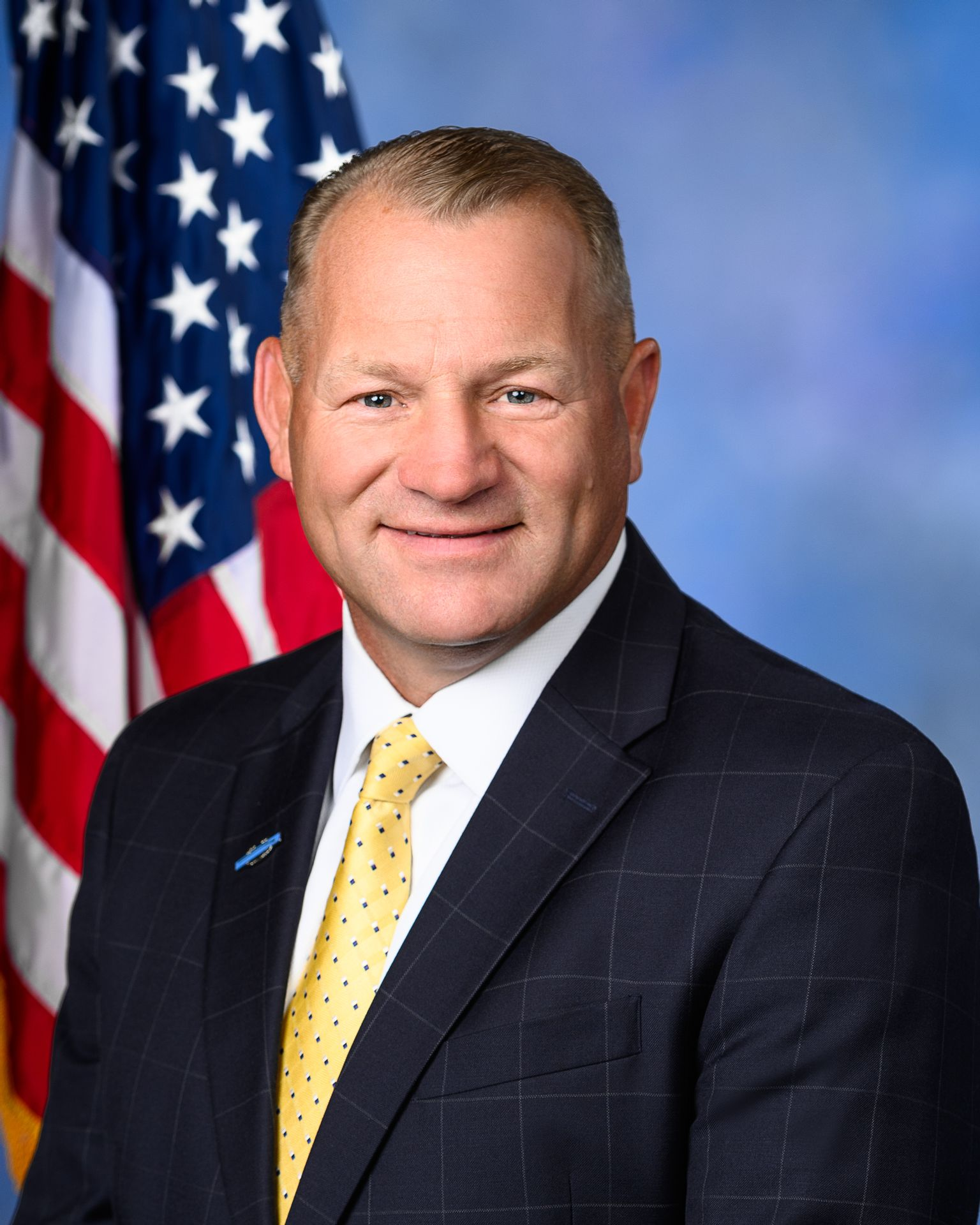
- Official portrait, 2020

Member of the U.S. House of Representatives from Texas's 22nd district
- Incumbent
- Assumed office January 3, 2021
- Preceded by: Pete Olson

Sheriff of Fort Bend County
- In office January 1, 2013 – January 1, 2021
- Preceded by: Milton Wright
- Succeeded by: Eric Fagan

Personal details
- Born: Troy Edwin Nehls; April 7, 1968 (age 58) Beaver Dam, Wisconsin, U.S.
- Party: Republican
- Spouse: Jill Broxson (m. 2009)
- Children: 3
- Relatives: Trever Nehls (brother)
- Education: Liberty University (BA); University of Houston, Downtown (MA)
- Website: House website Campaign website

Military service
- Branch/service: United States Army; U.S. Army Reserve
- Years of service: 1988–2009
- Rank: Major
- Unit: Civil Affairs
- Battles/wars: Iraq War; War in Afghanistan
- Awards: Bronze Star Medal (2)

Troy Edwin Nehls (/nɛlz/ NELZ; born April 7, 1968) is an American politician and former law-enforcement officer serving as the U.S. representative for Texas's 22nd congressional district since 2021. Before his election to Congress, he served as the sheriff for Fort Bend County, Texas from 2013 to 2021. Nehls is a member of the Republican Party.

Nehls is a strong supporter and defender of President Donald Trump, and has, among other things, called for renaming Dulles International Airport after Trump and called on the Republican Party to obediently support whatever Trump says and does.

On November 29, 2025, Nehls announced that he would not seek reelection in the 2026 elections in order to focus on his family.

== Early life and education ==
Nehls was born in Beaver Dam, Wisconsin. His father, Edwin Nehls, served in the Korean War and as sheriff of Dodge County, Wisconsin. Nehls enlisted in the United States Army Reserve in 1988. He served tours of duty in Bosnia, Iraq, and Afghanistan, and earned two Bronze Stars. He earned his bachelor's degree from Liberty University and a master's degree in criminal justice from University of Houston–Downtown.

== Career ==
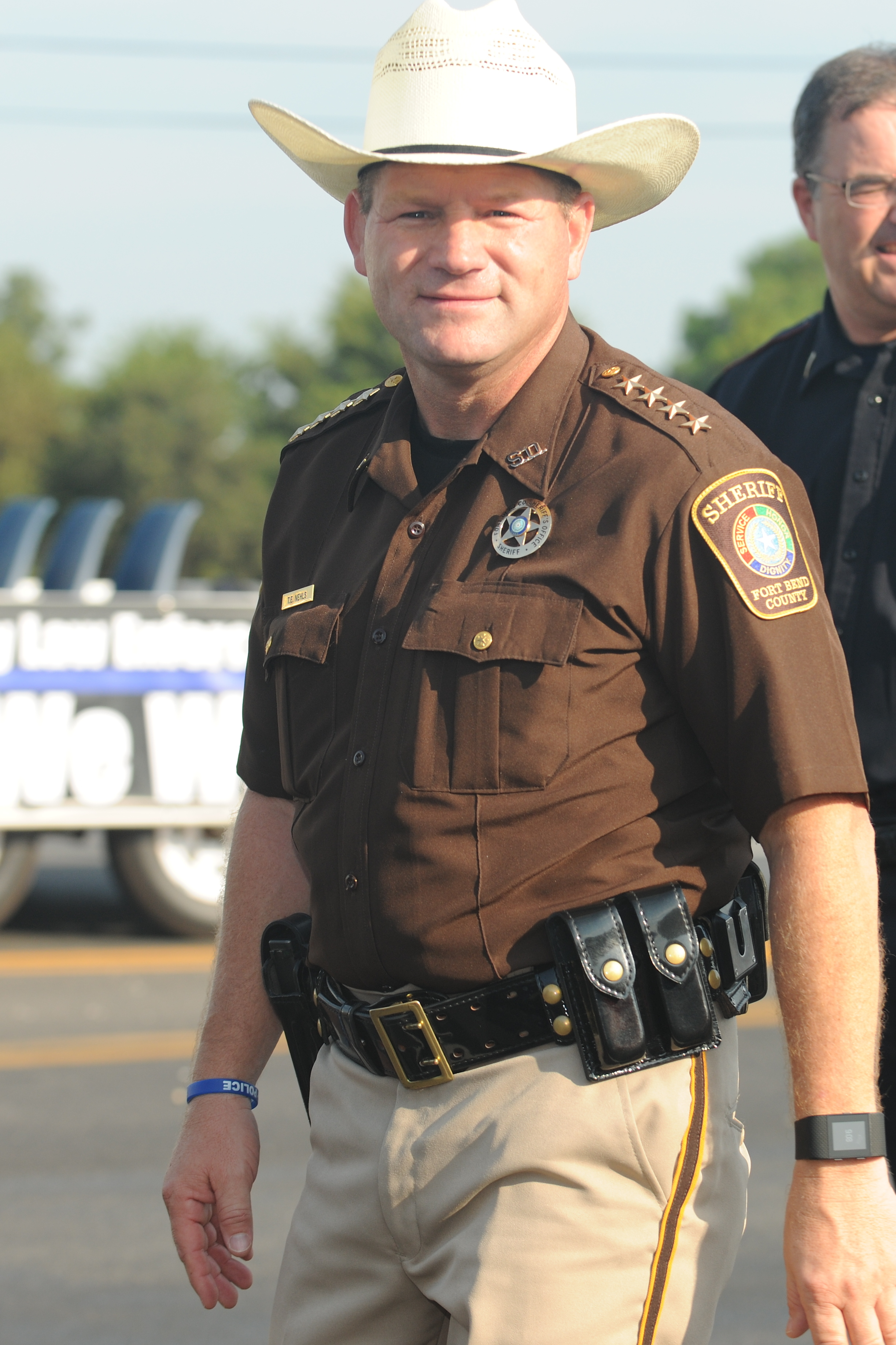
Nehls while serving as Sheriff of Fort Bend County, 2015

=== Military and law enforcement ===
In 1988, Nehls joined the Army Reserve. Nehls moved to Fort Bend County, Texas, in 1994, and joined the police department of Richmond, Texas. In 1998, he was fired for reasons including destruction of evidence.

In 2004, Nehls was elected constable for Fort Bend County, while he was serving as a reservist in Iraq.

In 2012, Nehls was elected sheriff of Fort Bend County, taking office in January 2013. He was reelected in 2016. In July 2019, he announced that he would not seek reelection as sheriff in November 2020.

In October 2008, Nehls was awarded the Combat Infantryman Badge (CIB) but the CIB was rescinded and he was awarded the Combat Action Badge (CAB) for his service in Afghanistan in March 2008. In March 2023, the military rescinded the award of the badge to Nehls, because he was not eligible to receive it – he was neither an infantryman nor a special forces operator, but was instead a civil affairs officer. The revocation became public in May 2024.

Nehls continued to wear the badge, saying that he disagreed with the revocation, and that he believed "this is a concerted effort to discredit my military service and continued service to the American people as a member of Congress." Nehls subsequently stopped wearing the badge owing in large part to these stolen-valor claims against him.

He separated from the Army Reserve with the rank of major in 2009.

=== Congress ===
Nehls formed an exploratory committee for Texas's 22nd congressional district for the 2018 elections, which would have pitted him against incumbent Republican Pete Olson, but decided in December 2017 not to run for that office.

In mid-July 2019, Nehls created a website where he asked Fort Bend County residents whether he should run for Congress in the 22nd congressional district, which covers Katy, Sugar Land, and Pearland. On July 25, 2019, Olson announced he would not seek re-election in 2020. In December 2019, Nehls announced that he would run for the seat.

== U.S. House of Representatives ==
=== 2020 election ===
Nehls finished first in the March 2020 Republican primary with 40.5% of the vote. In the July runoff, he defeated second-place finisher Kathaleen Wall, receiving 70% of the vote.

According to his campaign website, Nehls ran to improve mental and physical health care for veterans and to protect oil and gas jobs in Texas.

In the general election in November, Nehls faced Democratic nominee Sri Preston Kulkarni. He defeated Kulkarni, 52% to 45%, and assumed office on January 3, 2021.

=== 117th Congress ===
In his first week in the U.S. House, Nehls and other members of Congress were seen assisting U.S. Capitol Police in barricading the door to the House floor from protesters during the 2021 United States Capitol attack. Nehls admonished rioters trying to enter the House chamber.

On January 7, 2021, Nehls joined 121 other Republican members of Congress in objecting to counting certain electoral votes in the 2020 presidential election. On January 13, 2021, he voted against the second impeachment of President Donald Trump.

After President Joe Biden delivered a speech to a joint session of Congress in April 2021, Nehls approached Biden and said he wanted to work together on criminal-justice reform. Biden administration staff subsequently reached out to Nehls's office. On May 25, 2021, Nehls partnered with Representative Val Demings to introduce H.R. 3529, the Second Chance Opportunity for Re-Entry Education (SCORE) Act, to direct grant funds to county jails for career-training programs for nonviolent, incarcerated individuals to reduce jail recidivism.

On January 3, 2022, Nehls entered a full transcript of an interview on The Joe Rogan Experience with Robert W. Malone into the Congressional Record to circumvent what he said was censorship by social media.

In the wake of the FBI search of presidential records at Mar-a-Lago in 2022, Nehls announced his support for Donald Trump for president in 2024 and denounced the FBI and Department of Justice as "corrupt".

in 2022, Nehls published his book The Big Fraud: What Democrats Don't Want You to Know about January 6, the 2020 Election, and a Whole Lot Else, which laid out his thoughts on events around that presidential election.

=== 118th Congress ===
Nehls in January 2024 indicated that he would not support an immigration bill regarding the Mexico–United States border being negotiated by the Senate and the Biden administration, because the bill would "help Joe Biden's approval rating". Nehls further said, "Congress doesn't have to do anything to secure our southern border and fix it."

During the 2024 State of the Union Address, Nehls wore a shirt featuring Donald Trump's mug shot and the words "Never Surrender!" He later co-sponsored a bill to rename Dulles International Airport after Trump in April.

On March 26, 2024, the United States House Committee on Ethics announced Nehls was the subject of an investigation. The committee did not specify the focus of the investigation, but Nehls said it was related to his campaign's finances. On May 10, 2024, the independent Office of Congressional Ethics reported its findings that probable cause was determined, indicating that Nehls had converted campaign funds for personal use, and recommended further review.

On the issue of Trump's threatened tariffs, Nehls said, "If Donald Trump says tariffs work, tariffs work. Period. Because Donald Trump is really never wrong."

Following a GOP conference meeting with President-elect Trump on November 13, 2024, Nehls enthused to gathered news reporters:

"So now he's got a mission statement of his mission and his goals and objective. Whatever that is, we need to embrace it. All of it. Every single word. If Donald Trump says jump three feet high and scratch your head, we all jump three feet high and scratch our heads. And that's it. He's the greatest thing since sliced bread!"

=== 119th Congress ===
On January 22, 2026, during a hearing on former special counsel Jack Smith's investigations into Trump's mishandling of classified documents and role in the January 6 United States Capitol attack, Nehls blamed the attack on United States Capitol Police (USCP) rather than Trump, prompting USCP officer Michael Fanone to respond: "Go fuck yourself."

In April 2026, days after Donald Trump criticized Pope Leo XIV and shared a meme that depicted himself as Jesus Christ, Nehls compared Trump to the Second Coming of Christ. “I believe that Donald Trump is better than sliced bread. I think he’s almost the second coming, in my humble opinion,” Nehls said.

In June 2026, after being asked how he intends to make the case to his constituents that he’s fighting for affordability, Nehls replied “Affordability, what are you talking about? Over the Fourth, I'm going to get me a couple of big lobster tails; I'm going to get me some nice rib-eyes.” When a reporter followed up by asking “Do you think the 60% of Americans living paycheck to paycheck can afford lobster tails and rib eyes and all of that?”, he replied “Maybe not. Maybe the 60% of Americans don't work as hard as I do”.

=== Committee assignments ===
- U.S. House Committee on Transportation & Infrastructure
  - Subcommittee on Railroads, Pipelines, and Hazardous Materials (chairman)
  - Subcommittee on Highways and Transit
- United States House Committee on the Judiciary
- Committee on the January 6 Attack (retracted by Kevin McCarthy)

=== Caucus memberships ===
- Republican Study Committee
- Western Caucus
- Border Security Caucus
- Bipartisan Taskforce for Combating Antisemitism
- General Aviation Caucus

== Electoral history ==
Republican primary results, 2020
Party	Candidate	Votes	%
Republican	Troy Nehls	29,583	40.5
Republican	Kathaleen Wall	14,201	19.4
Republican	Pierce Bush	11,281	15.4
Republican	Greg Hill	10,315	14.1
Republican	Dan Mathews	2,165	3.0

Texas's 22nd congressional district: 2020 results
Year	Republican	Votes	Pct	Democratic	Votes	Pct	Libertarian	Party	Votes	Pct
2020	Troy Nehls	204,537	51.7%	Sri Preston Kulkarni	175,738	44.4%	Joseph LeBlanc	Libertarian	15,452	3.9%

Texas's 22nd congressional district: 2022 results
Year	Republican	Votes	Pct	Democratic	Votes	Pct	Libertarian	Party	Votes	Pct
2022	Troy Nehls	149,757	62.3%	Jamie Jordan	85,440	35.5%	Joseph LeBlanc	Libertarian	5,362	2.2%

Texas's 22nd congressional district: 2024 results
Year	Republican	Votes	Pct	Democratic	Votes	Pct	Libertarian	Party	Votes	Pct
2024	Troy Nehls	209,285	62.1%	Marquette Green-Scott	127,604	37.9%				

== Personal life ==
Nehls has a twin brother, Trever Nehls, who served in the Army Reserve for 24 years, including tours in Iraq and Afghanistan. Another brother, Todd, served in the Wisconsin Army National Guard and is a former sheriff of Dodge County. Trever succeeded Troy as a constable for Fort Bend County in 2013, and won the Republican nomination to succeed him as the sheriff of Fort Bend County in March 2020, however he was defeated in the general election.

Nehls and his wife, Jill, an educator, have three daughters.

Nehls is a Dispensationalist Protestant.

On May 18, 2023, the National Shooting Sports Foundation (NSSF) awarded Nehls its Real Solutions Champion award for "his contributions to keeping communities safe during his law enforcement and Congressional career".

U.S. House of Representatives
Preceded by Pete Olson	Member of the U.S. House of Representatives from Texas's 22nd congressional district 2021–present	Incumbent
U.S. order of precedence (ceremonial)
Preceded by Frank J. Mrvan	United States representatives by seniority 269th	Succeeded by Jay Obernolte
