= Robert R. Casey =

Texas politician (1915–1986)

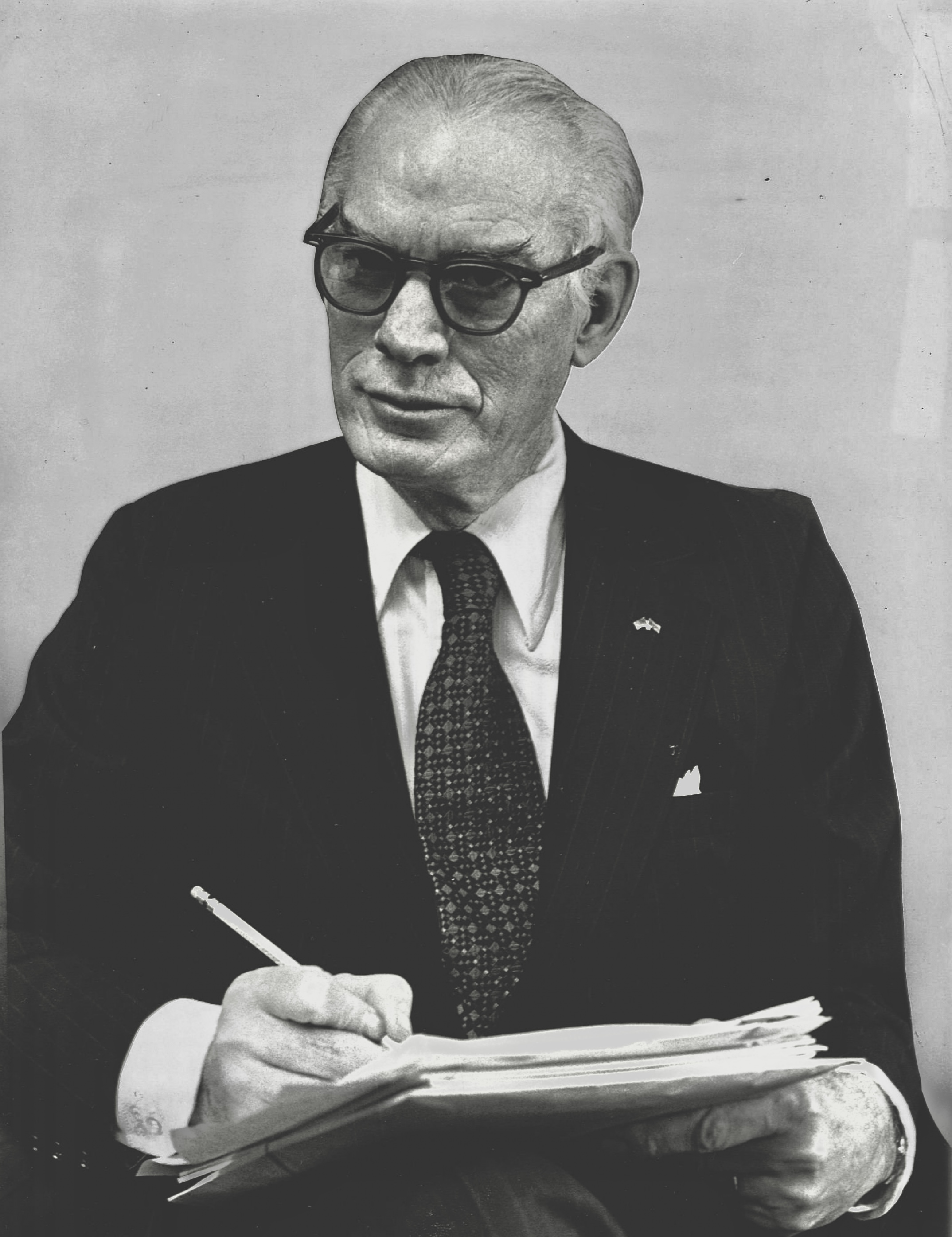

Member of the U.S. House of Representatives from Texas's 22nd district
- In office January 3, 1959 – January 22, 1976
- Preceded by: District created
- Succeeded by: Ron Paul

Member of the Texas House of Representatives from the 24th district
- In office January 1949 – January 1951

Personal details
- Born: Robert Randolph Casey; July 27, 1915 Joplin, Missouri, U.S.
- Died: April 17, 1986 (aged 70) Houston, Texas, U.S.
- Party: Democratic
- Education: University of Houston; South Texas College of Law
- Profession: Attorney

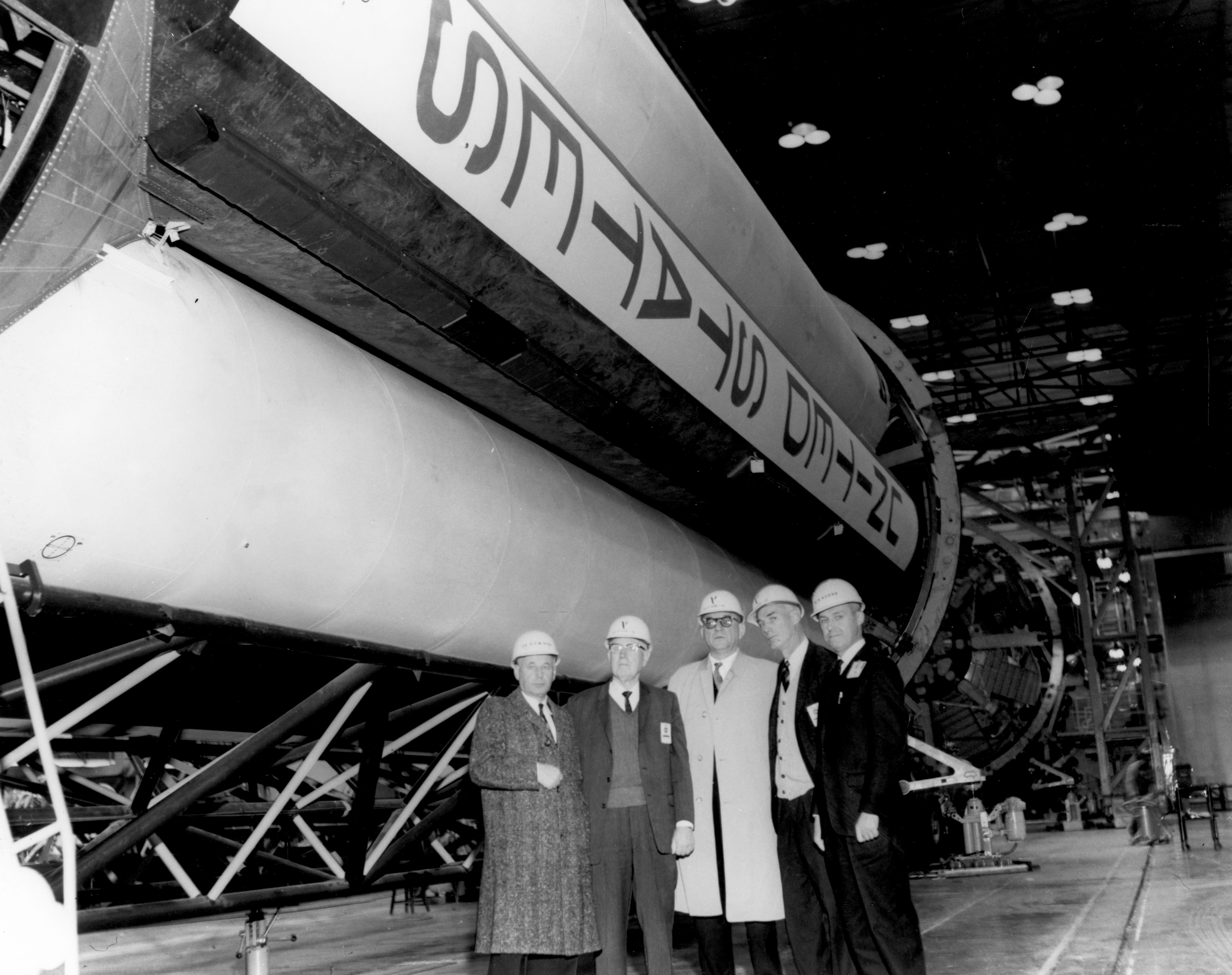
Representative Casey and other members of the House Committee on Science and Astronautics visited the Marshall Space Flight Center on January 3, 1962 to gather firsthand information of the nation's space exploration program.

Robert Randolph Casey (July 27, 1915 – April 17, 1986) was a member of the United States House of Representatives. He was a Democrat from Texas.

== Early life ==
Casey was born in Joplin, Missouri, but moved to Houston, Texas as a teenager, where he attended the city's San Jacinto High School. Casey earned his undergraduate degree from the University of Houston and a Juris Doctor from the South Texas College of Law. In 1940, he was admitted to the bar and established a private practice in Alvin, Texas. Two years later, he became the city attorney.

== Political career ==
In 1943, Casey returned to Houston to become Harris County's assistant district attorney. Casey first ran for office in 1948 when he was able to earn a seat in the Texas House of Representatives, representing the 24th district (Houston). However, he chose not to run for reelection to this post, instead spending the next eight years as Harris County Judge (equivalent to a county executive). He was also an administrator at South Texas College.

Casey was elected to the United States House in 1958 in the newly created 22nd district. He defeated the Republican Thomas Everton Kennerly, Sr. (1903-2000) by 43,660 (61.7%) to 23,317 (33%). (Kennerly subsequently went on to be his party's gubernatorial nominee in 1966 against John B. Connally, Jr.)

Casey was a member of the House Committee on Government Reform and the Committee on the Post Office and the Civil Service. In 1976, he left the House after his appointment to the Federal Maritime Commission by President Gerald R. Ford. He later returned to the practice of law for several years prior to his death.

Casey died in Houston on April 17, 1986. He is buried at Memorial Oaks Cemetery in Houston.

== Memorials ==
The Bob Casey Federal Courthouse, housing the United States District Court for the Southern District of Texas at 515 Rusk Street in Houston, is named after Bob Casey.

Texas House of Representatives
Preceded by unknown	Member of the Texas House of Representatives from District 24 (Houston); 1949 – 1951	Succeeded by unknown
U.S. House of Representatives
Preceded by District created	Member of the U.S. House of Representatives from Texas's 22nd congressional district 1959-1976	Succeeded by Ron Paul
