= Civil Rights Uniformity Act of 2017 =

Legislative history
- Bill citation: H.R. 2796
- Introduced by: Pete Olson [R-TX-22]
- Introduced: June 7, 2017

Summary
- Strict interpretation of "sex" and "gender" to refer to biological identity only for United States federal civil rights legislation

Keywords
- transgender rights, gender identity

House Resolution 2796 (HR 2796, The Civil Rights Uniformity Act of 2017) was a bill in the United States House of Representatives that was introduced on June 7, 2017, by Representative Pete Olson [R-TX-22] and originally cosponsored by Reps. Brian Babin [R-TX-36], Ralph Lee Abraham [R-LA-5], and Vicky Hartzler [R-MO-4]. The proposed legislation would prohibit the interpretation of the word "sex" or "gender" to include "gender identity," and would require the terms "man" or "woman" to refer exclusively to a person's biologically assigned gender in the interpretation of federal civil rights laws, federal administrative agency regulations, and federal guidance. The bill has attracted five additional cosponsors since its introduction.

== Overview ==
According to the bill summary,

This bill prohibits the word "sex" or "gender" from being interpreted to mean "gender identity," and requires "man" or "woman" to be interpreted to refer exclusively to a person's genetic sex, for purposes determining the meaning of federal civil rights laws or related federal administrative agency regulations or guidance.

No federal civil rights law shall be interpreted to treat gender identity or transgender status as a protected class, unless it expressly designates "gender identity" or "transgender status" as a protected class.

— HR 2796 Summary

Rep. Pete Olson stated "The Founding Fathers never intended unelected bureaucrats in federal agencies to make sweeping changes to the definition of gender."

HR 5812, a bill containing nearly identical text and co-sponsored by many of the same Representatives (in addition to Reps. Babin, Grothman, and Hartzler, HR 5812 was co-sponsored by Rep. Dave Brat [R-VA-7]), was introduced to the House on July 14, 2016, where it died in committee. The National Center for Transgender Equality did not recommend any action on HR 2796, as it was also likely to die in committee.

== Actions ==
HR 2796 was introduced to the house on June 7, 2017 from the House Committee on the Judiciary. It was later referred to the United States House Judiciary Subcommittee on the Constitution and Civil Justice on July 12, 2017.

== Sponsors ==
- Pete Olson [R-TX-22], sponsor (also sponsored HR 5812)
- Brian Babin [R-TX-36], original co-sponsor (also co-sponsored HR 5812)
- Ralph Lee Abraham [R-LA-5], original co-sponsor
- Vicky Hartzler [R-MO-4], original co-sponsor (also co-sponsored HR 5812)
- Trent Franks [R-AZ-8], co-sponsor June 8, 2017
- Steve King [R-IA-4], co-sponsor July 11, 2017
- Walter B. Jones Jr. [R-NC-3], co-sponsor July 17, 2017
- Louie Gohmert [R-TX-1], co-sponsor July 18, 2017
- Glenn Grothman [R-WI-6], co-sponsor July 18, 2017 (also co-sponsored HR 5812)
- Raúl Labrador [R-ID-1], co-sponsor July 24, 2017

== Bill Text ==
A BILL To repeal executive overreach, to clarify that the proper constitutional authority for social transformation belongs to the legislative branch.

Be it enacted by the Senate and House of Representatives of the United States of America in Congress assembled,

SECTION 1. SHORT TITLE.

This Act may be cited as the “Civil Rights Uniformity Act of 2017”.

SEC. 2. CONGRESSIONAL FINDINGS AND DECLARATION OF PURPOSE.

1. Findings.—Congress finds the following:
  1. Over the past half century, Congress has passed numerous civil rights laws prohibiting discrimination on the basis of “sex”, a designation long understood to be grounded in objective biology up to the present day. There is no evidence that Congress or the American people ever understood the word sex or gender in civil rights laws to include subjective self-identification.
  2. For years, advocates have pressed Congress to include a person’s subjective self-declared “gender identity” in Federal civil rights laws that prohibit sex discrimination. Congress has declined to do so except for the Shepard-Byrd Act of 2009 and the Violence Against Women Reauthorization Act of 2013 where gender identity is defined as “actual or perceived gender-related characteristics” with “gender”, there referring to characteristics associated with biological males and females.
  3. This demonstrates that when Congress wants to protect sex, it does so explicitly; when it wants to also elevate gender identity it does so explicitly; and when it does not want to elevate gender identity, it can do so either explicitly or by simply not disturbing the status quo.
  4. Despite the complete clarity of this point, President Barack Obama’s administration has attempted to effectively replace the word “sex” with the phrase “gender identity” for purposes of Federal antidiscrimination law and policy through a series of unilateral executive actions.
  5. For example, on December 15, 2014, Attorney General Eric Holder announced that the Department of Justice would reinterpret the ban on “sex” discrimination under title VII of the Civil Rights Act of 1964 to encompass “gender identity”. This was followed on March 27, 2015, by an Equal Employment Opportunity Commission decision holding that declining to use a female pronoun to address a male who identifies as female constituted “sex” discrimination under title VII.
  6. On May 9, 2016, the Obama administration sued the State of North Carolina and threatened it with fines and loss of Federal funding if it did not adopt the administration’s incorrect readings of title VII of the Civil Rights Act of 1964 and title IX of the Education Amendments of 1972.
  7. On May 13, 2016, the Departments of Justice and Education issued a “significant guidance” letter stating that under title IX of the Education Amendments of 1972 “when a school provides sex-segregated activities and facilities, transgender students must be allowed to participate in such activities and access such facilities consistent with their gender identity.” The guidance further states that schools “must treat a student’s gender identity as the student’s sex” including in the context of “sex-segregated restrooms, locker rooms, shower facilities, housing, and athletic teams, as well as single-sex classes.” In other words, the Departments consider it a title IX violation if a person of the male sex who self-identifies as a female is not granted unfettered access to women’s or girls’ dorms, showers, locker rooms, and bathrooms. This, despite assurance that such a thing would never happen from the likes of Ruth Bader Ginsburg who wrote in 1975 that “separate places to disrobe, sleep, perform personal bodily functions are permitted, in some situations required, by regard for individual privacy.” This position was codified in Federal regulations, 34 CFR 106.33, which state that recipients of Federal funds “may provide separate toilet, locker room, and shower facilities on the basis of sex,” with sex obviously referring to biology.
  8. Also on May 13, 2016, the Department of Health and Human Services finalized regulations that redefined the Affordable Care Act’s prohibition on “sex” discrimination in federally funded health programs and activities to cover “gender identity”, thereby opening health care professionals and insurers to extensive liability if they decline to participate in or pay for “gender transition” treatments or “sex change” operations.
  9. The Obama administration’s actions are an affront to the rule of law, the separation of powers, the will of the people, language, history, safety, privacy, and biological realities.
2. Purpose.—The purposes of this Act are—
  1. to prevent the executive branch from unilaterally rewriting Federal civil rights laws by enacting or implementing any policy or undertaking any enforcement action that is based on construing the term “sex” or “gender” to mean “gender identity”; and
  2. to ensure that gender identity is not treated as a protected class in Federal law or policy without the affirmative approval of the people’s representatives in Congress.

SEC. 3. PROHIBITION OF POLICIES REDEFINING SEX TO MEAN GENDER IDENTITY.

1. Rule Of Construction.—In determining the meaning of any Federal civil rights law, and of any related ruling, regulation, guidance, or interpretation of the various administrative bureaus and agencies of the United States, the words “sex” and “gender” and their equivalents shall not be interpreted to mean “gender identity” or its equivalent, and the words “man” and “woman” and their equivalents shall refer exclusively to a person’s genetic sex.
2. Rule Of Interpretation.—No Federal civil rights law shall be interpreted to treat gender identity or transgender status as a protected class, unless such law expressly designates “gender identity” or “transgender status” as a protected class.
3. Definition Of “Federal Civil Rights Law”.—For purposes of this Act, the term “Federal civil rights law” means any Federal law prohibiting discrimination on the basis of sex or gender, including title IX of the Education Amendments of 1972 (20 U.S.C. § 1681 et seq.), the Civil Rights Act of 1964 (42 U.S.C. § 2000a et seq.), the Fair Housing Act (42 U.S.C. § 3601 et seq.), the Patient Protection and Affordable Care Act (Pub. L. 111–148 (text) (PDF)), and any other Federal law or provision thereof prohibiting discrimination on the basis of sex or gender.

== See also ==
- Transgender disenfranchisement in the United States
- Identity documents in the United States
- History of transgender people in the United States
- LGBT rights in the United States
- Intersex rights in the United States
- Transgender rights
- Name change
- List of transgender-related topics
