= Trever Nehls =

American politician and sheriff (born 1968)

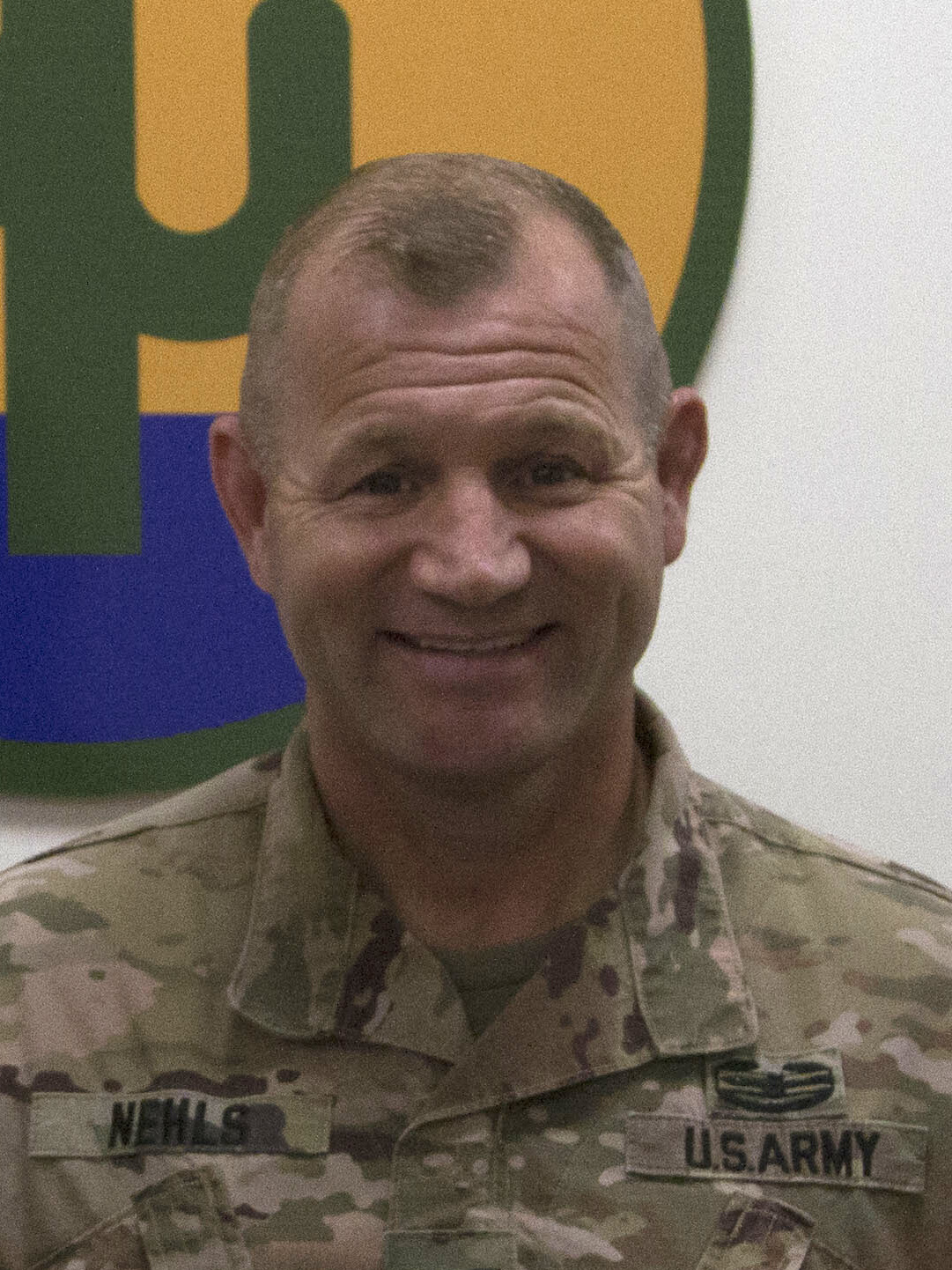
- Nehls in 2020

Member-elect of the U.S. House of Representatives from Texas's 22nd district
- Assuming office January 3, 2027
- Succeeding: Troy Nehls

Personal details
- Born: Trever Jay Nehls; April 7, 1968 (age 58) Beaver Dam, Wisconsin, U.S.
- Party: Republican
- Spouse: Kerri (m. 2000)
- Children: 3
- Relatives: Troy Nehls (brother)
- Education: University of Wisconsin, Platteville (BA); Central Michigan University (MPA); United States Army War College (MS)
- Website: Campaign website

Military service
- Branch/service: United States Army; U.S. Army Reserve
- Rank: Colonel
- Unit: Civil Affairs
- Battles/wars: Iraq War; War in Afghanistan
- Awards: Bronze Star Medal (3)

Trever Jay Nehls (/nɛlz/ NELZ; born April 7, 1968) is an American politician and former law-enforcement officer who served as a Fort Bend County constable from Precinct 4 from 2013 to 2020. Nehls is a member of the Republican Party and the twin brother of U.S. Representative Troy Nehls. He was elected in the 2026 election to replace his brother, which is the first time a member of Congress was succeeded by their identical twin.

== Early life and education ==
Nehls was born in Beaver Dam and grew up in Juneau, Wisconsin. His father, Edwin Nehls, served in the Korean War and as sheriff of Dodge County, Wisconsin. He enlisted in the US Army in 1988 and graduated from Command and General Staff College. He also graduated with master degrees in public administration from Central Michigan University and strategic studies from the United States Army War College.

== Career ==
=== Army and law enforcement ===
Nehls enlisted in the U.S. Army Reserves in 1988. He was a Provincial Reconstruction Team leader in Zabul, Afghanistan.

From 2004 to July 2005, Nehls was deployed for 11 months of active duty as a civil affairs team leader in Najaf, Iraq. In 2020, he was deployed to Kuwait on active duty until April. He retired with the rank of colonel and three Bronze Stars.

Nehls served as a sergeant in the Sugar Land police department.

=== Biotechnology and consulting ===
Nehls served as president of organic fertilizer company Texas Biotechnology. He founded Nehls Consulting LLC, a government affairs firm, in 2025.

== Political career ==
In October 2024, Nehls appeared with Donald Trump alongside his brothers at a rally in Wisconsin. In April 2026, Nehls was appointed in a chief of staff consulting role for interim Fort Bend county judge Daniel Wong. A judge appointed Wong, who is also the Republican nominee in the regularly scheduled county judge election in November 2026, to the role after incumbent KP George was suspended on money laundering charges. Both appointments were described as "unusual" by local political science professor Craig Goodman and media noted that Nehls would receive $13,380 per month from the county as part of his consultant contract.

=== Fort Bend County constable ===
In 2012, Nehls was elected to succeed his brother, Troy Nehls, as Fort Bend County constable in Precinct 4. He was unopposed for re-election in 2016. He was succeeded by Nabil Shike.

=== 2020 Fort Bend County sheriff campaign ===
In 2020, Nehls ran to succeed his brother, who ran for the U.S. House, as Fort Bend County sheriff. He won the Republican primary election in absentia, as he was deployed in Kuwait on active duty, defeating two opponents with 81% of the vote. He was defeated by Democrat Eric Fagan by 5.2% of the vote.

=== 2022 Fort Bend County judge campaign ===
Nehls waves at the 2022 Fort Bend County Fair parade.

In August 2021, Nehls announced his campaign for Fort Bend County judge against incumbent Democrat KP George in the 2022 election. He was defeated by George in a tight race, placing behind George by 3.2% of the vote.

=== 2026 U.S. House campaign ===
Following his brothers' announcement that he would not seek re-election, Nehls announced his campaign to succeed him representing Texas's 22nd congressional district in the 2026 election.

== Personal life ==
Nehls resides in Richmond, Texas, with his wife, Kerri, and their three children. He is the elder identical twin brother of U.S. Representative Troy Nehls. Additionally, has an elder brother, Todd, who served in the Wisconsin Army National Guard and is a former sheriff of Dodge County, and a sister, Tammy.

In September 2025, Nehls, his wife, and an associated business entity were defendants in a lawsuit brought by numerous Fort Bend County agencies alleging they owed $27,330.44 in unpaid property taxes.

== Electoral history ==
=== 2022 ===
2022 Fort Bend County Judge Republican primary election
Party	Candidate	Votes	%
Republican	Trever Nehls	38,617	92.36%
Republican	Ibifrisolam Max-Alalibo	3,195	7.64%
Total votes		41,812	100.0%

2022 Fort Bend County Judge general election
Party	Candidate	Votes	%	±%
Democratic	KP George	127,152	51.61%	−1.34%
Republican	Trever Nehls	119,242	48.39%	+1.34%
Total votes		246,394	100.0%	N/A

=== 2020 ===
2020 Fort Bend County sheriff Republican primary election
Party	Candidate	Votes	%
Republican	Trever Nehls	44,780	81.85%
Republican	John Minchew	7,901	14.44%
Republican	Siddiqi Muzaffar	2,027	3.71%
Total votes		54,708	100.0%

2020 Fort Bend County sheriff general election
Party	Candidate	Votes	%	±%
Democratic	Eric Fagan	179,670	52.62%	+4.67%
Republican	Trever Nehls	161,765	47.38%	−4.67%
Total votes		341,435	100.0%	N/A

U.S. House of Representatives
Preceded by Troy Nehls	Member of the U.S. House of Representatives from Texas's 22nd congressional district Taking office 2027	Elect
