= Dean A. Hrbacek =

American lawyer

Dean A. Hrbacek is an American attorney and Republican politician who served as the mayor of Sugar Land, Texas from 1996 to 2002. Before serving in that capacity, he served as a city council member. In 2008, he ran unsuccessfully for the Republican nomination in Texas's 22nd congressional district.

== Personal life ==
Hrbacek attended the University of Houston at Clear Lake City and graduated with a bachelor's degree in accounting. He then attended the University of Houston where he received his Doctor of Jurisprudence degree from the University of Houston Law Center. Hrbacek is an attorney and a Certified Public Accountant (CPA). He has a law firm specializing in taxation, based in Sugar Land.

=== Mayor of Sugar Land ===
In 1996, while serving as a City Council member for Sugar Land's affluent District Four, which included a large part of the First Colony master-planned community including Sweetwater Country Club (the one-time home of the LPGA), Hrbacek decided to run for the mayor's office being vacated by incumbent Lee Duggan who was term limited from seeking re-election after serving a total of ten years. Sugar Land city officials are subject to four terms of two years each, which totals eight years of service, though a member may run for mayor after serving on Council.

Hrbacek won the election and was re-elected for two subsequent terms. During the time that Hrbacek served as mayor and on City Council, Sugar Land was recognized and received multiple times for the quality of its management and innovative governance. The once sleepy company town grew into one of Houston's largest and most affluent suburbs as the city annexed several portions of First Colony, a large master-planned community that now comprises the vast majority of Sugar Land's southern area.

The development of the Sugar Land Town Square, seen as a strong economic engine for Sugar Land, began during the late 1990s with Hrbacek playing a major role in the development of the project. The establishment of the University of Houston System at Sugar Land, the creation of several regional parks, major economic growth, and the lowering the city property tax rate by over 30% were all highlights of his time in office.

== 2002 mayoral campaign ==
In 2002, Hrbacek faced a tough re-election campaign for a fourth term against City Council member David Wallace, a businessman who had built up a base of support and had just been elected to the same City Council district Hrbacek held before becoming mayor. Wallace won the election after receiving the backing of several Republican leaders with whom he was allied in Fort Bend County and a local newspaper.

=== "Mayor Osama" controversy ===
Hrbacek's re-election bid was damaged by former conservative Houston radio talk show host Jon Matthews. Matthews hosted a radio talk show on KSEV. He endorsed Wallace and attacked Hrbacek through weekly newspaper columns in a local paper.

Matthews referred to Hrbacek as "Mayor Osama" and "Dean Osama Hrbacek", a reference to terrorist, al-Qaida leader and suspected 9/11 mastermind Osama bin Laden. Columns attacking Hrbacek by both Mathews and the publisher of the paper, along with radio attacks, were made during the weeks before the May 2002 election campaign. Following the election, Hrbacek filed a lawsuit against Matthews and the newspaper publisher, B.K. Carter, over the comments, which claimed that the comments also damaged the reputation of Hrbacek's law firm. The lawsuit, filed in Fort Bend County District Court, Case ID 02-CV-127119, was dismissed.

== Post-mayoral life ==
Hrbacek has served as a precinct chair for the Fort Bend County Republican Party, and has become one of the more high-profile precinct chairs in the county Republican establishment. Hrbacek has also served as the President of the Fort Bend Republican Club., and also served as a delegate and caucus official at Senatorial District and State Republican Conventions since 2000.

Hrbacek was approached in 2006 by community leaders to consider running for the heavily Republican 26th District in the Texas House of Representatives, which comprises Sugar Land and several immediate areas such as the portion of the First Colony planned community in Missouri City. He decided that he would run at that time only if the incumbent Republican, Charlie Howard, chose not to run. When Howard indicated he would run in 2006, Hrbacek dropped out of the race.

=== Influence in 2006 congressional race (for Texas's 22nd congressional district) ===
Hrbacek served as a Precinct Chair delegate representing Fort Bend in the nomination process for the Republican write-in candidate to challenge Democratic ex-Congressman Nick Lampson and Libertarian Bob Smither in the general election to replace former House Majority Leader Tom DeLay. On April 3, 2006, DeLay decided not to seek re-election following an indictment related to campaign finances by District Attorney, Ronnie Earle, in Travis County. (As of February 2008, the case against DeLay is still pending.)

Hrbacek was among the majority of Fort Bend Precinct Chairs who rejected efforts by Sugar Land Mayor David Wallace to become the Republican nominee in 2006. Republican precinct chairs from four counties, including Harris, Brazoria, and Galveston in addition to Fort Bend, later nominated dermatologist and Houston city councilwoman Shelley Sekula-Gibbs as a candidate in 2006. She won a special election to fill the remainder of DeLay's term but lost in the write in campaign for the general election by 10 points to Lampson who was on the ballot.

== 2008 Congressional race (Texas's 22nd District) ==
Following Nick Lampson's 2006 victory, Hrbacek was strongly encouraged to run against Lampson, given the latter's vulnerability in a heavily Republican district due to its strongly conservative nature. In fact, it was the most conservative district in the country that fell to a Democrat, having given George W. Bush a 2-to-1 margin of victory over Democratic candidate John Kerry in 2004.

On October 4, 2007, Hrbacek formally announced his candidacy for Congress.

=== Media endorsements ===
Hrbacek has been endorsed by the Houston Chronicle, which praised his record as mayor and his support for expanded rail transit. He was also endorsed by the Fort Bend Independent.

=== Grassroots endorsements ===
Hrbacek's campaign has also been endorsed by a large number of grassroots leaders including over 40 precinct chairs and current and former elected officials across the district. Included among them are: State Republican Executive Committeewoman (SREC) District 17 - Terese Raia, Former SREC District 17 Committeeman - Tim Turner, Former Republican Party of Fort Bend County Chairman - Jim Stokes and Former Fort Bend County Judge - Mike Rozell. Former Sugar Land City Councilmembers from across the district have also endorsed Hrbacek. They include former Sugar Land Councilmembers Don Smithers, Brian Gaston and Mike Siweirka along with former Missouri City Councilmember Bob Burton.

=== Financial filings ===
As of February 29, 2008, Hrbacek's campaign is fourth with total fundraising at $266,086. This total includes a loan from Hrbacek to his campaign of $113,000.

In the October 2007 filing, the Hrbacek Campaign reported net contributions of $109,195 ranking his campaign fourth in 3rd quarter contributions. In the 2007 Year End filing, the Hrbacek campaign reported net contributions of $37,592 which was sixth most for the quarter. In the Pre-Primary filing covering 1 January through February 13, the Hrbacek campaign collected $6,299, which ranked eighth among all candidates filing.

The Hrbacek Campaign has made an effort to collect contributions from within the boundaries of Texas Congressional District 22 and with the exception of Political Action Committees, did not accept or solicit large contributions from lobbyists, D.C. insiders and special interests outside of CD 22.

=== Photoshop controversy ===
On January 19, 2008, a mailer containing a photo that was presented as a true image of Hrbacek was in reality a computerized composite of Hrbacek's face and someone else's slimmer figure, in suit and tie, from neck to knee. Campaign manager, Scott Broschart, confirmed that the image was fake, and that Hebacek didn't have time for a photoshoot.

=== Election results ===
In the 2008 Republican primary, Hrbacek collected 10.5 percent of the vote to finish in fifth place.
