= Robert Talton =

American politician (born 1945)

Member of the Texas House of Representatives from the 144th district
- In office January 12, 1993 – January 13, 2009
- Succeeded by: Ken Legler

Personal details
- Born: Robert Edwin Talton; June 27, 1945 (age 81) Pasadena, Texas, U.S.
- Party: Republican
- Spouse: Sue Talton
- Children: 2
- Education: University of Houston; South Texas College of Law Houston

Robert Edwin Talton (born June 27, 1945) is an American politician. He served as a Republican member for the 144th district of the Texas House of Representatives until 2009.

== Life and career ==
Born in Pasadena, Texas, Talton attended Pasadena High School. He went on to the University of Houston, where he earned his bachelor's degree, and the South Texas College of Law Houston, where he earned a Juris Doctor degree.

In 1993, he was elected to represent the 144th district of the Texas House of Representatives. In 2009, Talton was succeeded by Ken Legler.

Talton was a candidate for the 22nd district of Texas of the United States House of Representatives in 2008, but lost the election. He has also been a candidate to serve as the chief justice of the Supreme Court of Texas, running against Nathan Hecht.
