= 2024 Texas's 18th congressional district special election =

- November 5, 2024

Texas's 18th congressional district
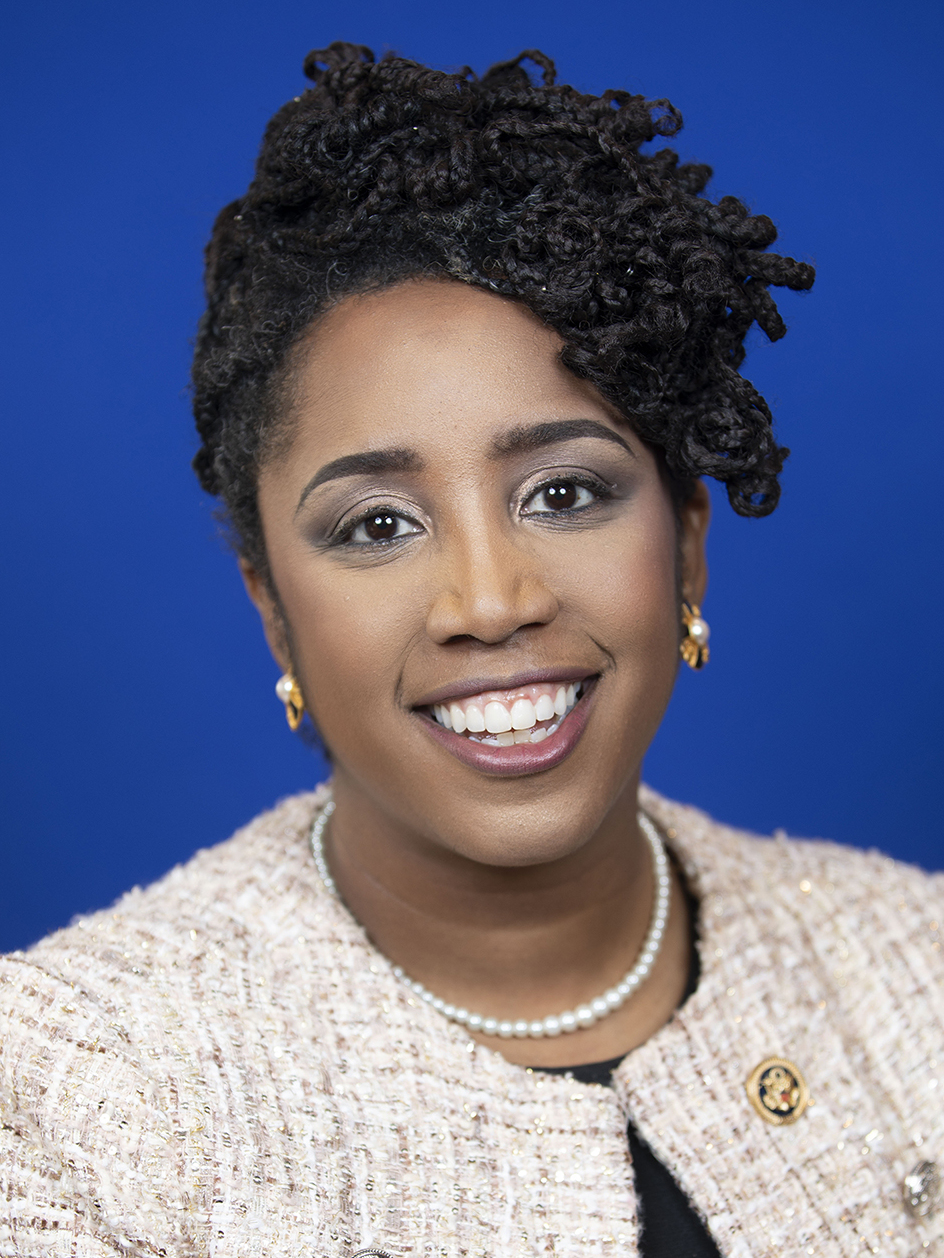

Nominee	Erica Lee Carter	Maria Dunn	Kevin Dural
Party	Democratic	Republican	Republican
Popular vote	146,413	47,835	21,257
Percentage	67.9%	22.2%	9.9%
- Carter: 40–50% 50–60% 60–70% 70–80% 80–90% >90% Dunn: 30–40% 40–50% No votes
U.S. Representative before election
Sheila Jackson Lee
Democratic
Elected U.S. Representative
Erica Lee Carter
Democratic

The 2024 Texas's 18th congressional district special election was a special election that was held on November 5, 2024, to choose a new member of the U.S. House of Representatives. The seat became vacant when incumbent Rep. Sheila Jackson Lee died on July 19, 2024.

The special election only filled the remainder of Jackson Lee's unexpired term, from November 2024 until January 2025. Harris County Democratic party precinct chairs convened on August 13 to nominate former Houston mayor Sylvester Turner as a replacement on the ballot in the general election, which took place the same day as the special election and decided a congressperson for the new term beginning in January 2025. Upon being selected as the nominee, Turner chose not to run in the special election and endorsed Erica Lee Carter, the daughter of Jackson Lee.

Candidates had until August 22 to declare their candidacy in the all-party special election. If no candidate received a majority of the vote, a runoff would have been held on a later date. As a deeply blue urban district, this race was considered safe for Democrats.

== Candidates ==
=== Democratic Party ===
==== Declared ====
- Erica Lee Carter, former Harris County Department of Education trustee and daughter of deceased incumbent Sheila Jackson Lee

==== Withdrawn ====
- Dwight Boykins, former Houston city councilor from district D (2014–2019) and candidate for mayor of Houston in 2019
- James Dixon, pastor and president of NAACP Houston (endorsed Lee Carter)
- Amanda Edwards, former at-large Houston city councilor (2016–2020), candidate for this district in the 2024 regular election, and candidate for U.S. Senate in 2020
- Sylvester Turner, former mayor of Houston (2016–2024) and nominee for this district in the general election (endorsed Lee Carter)

==== Declined ====
- Jolanda Jones, state representative from the 147th district (2022–present) (endorsed Turner)
- Christian Menefee, Harris County Attorney (2021–present) (endorsed Turner)

=== Republican Party ===
==== Declared ====
- Maria Dunn, retiree
- Kevin Dural, infrastructure project manager

== Endorsements ==
Erica Lee Carter (D)

Municipal officials

- Sylvester Turner, former mayor of Houston (2016–2024) and nominee for this district in the general election

== Polling ==
Poll source	Date(s) administered	Sample size (Note: Key: A – all adults RV – registered voters LV – likely voters V – unclear)	Margin of error	Amanda Edwards	Jarvis Johnson	Christina Morales	Letitia Plumber	Sylvester Turner	Undecided
Texas Victory Consulting	August 5–7, 2024	1,113 (V)	± 2.0%	33%	9%	3%	3%	34%	16%

== Results ==
2024 Texas's 18th congressional district special election
Party	Candidate	Votes	%
Democratic	Erica Lee Carter	146,413	67.94
Republican	Maria Dunn	47,835	22.20
Republican	Kevin Dural	21,257	9.86
Total votes		215,505	100.00
Democratic hold			

== See also ==
- 2024 United States House of Representatives elections
  - 2024 United States House of Representatives elections in Texas
- List of special elections to the United States House of Representatives
- List of United States representatives from Texas
- 118th United States Congress
