= 2025 Texas elections =

- November 4, 2025

Elections were held in Texas on November 4, 2025.

Texas voters statewide voted on 17 proposed amendments to the Texas Constitution. Special elections were also held for the Texas State Senate in District 9 and to the U.S. House of Representatives in Texas' 18th congressional district. In addition, numerous municipalities held mayoral and city council elections on May 3.

== Constitutional amendment election ==
There were 17 proposed amendments to the Texas Constitution which appeared on the November 4, 2025 general election ballot in Texas. All were approved, with most passing with over 60% of the votes in favor.

== Special elections ==
=== 18th congressional district special election ===
Incumbent Democrat Sylvester Turner died on March 5, 2025. A blanket primary was held on November 4, 2025 to fill his unexpired term. No candidate received a majority of the vote in the first round, leading to a runoff between the top two candidates: county attorney Christian Menefee and former city councilwoman Amanda Edwards. The runoff election was held on January 31, 2026 with Menefee winning by 37 points.

=== Senate District 9 special election ===
A special election was held on November 4, 2025, with a runoff on January 31, 2026, to fill the vacant 9th district in the Texas Senate. The district was vacant following the resignation of Republican Kelly Hancock to become the Texas Comptroller of Public Accounts. The election was won by Democrat Taylor Rehmet.

=== Houston City Council At-Large Position 4 special election ===
Incumbent Houston City Councilmember Letitia Plummer for At-Large Position 4 announced she would run for Harris County Judge in 2026. As Houston has enacted a resign-to-run law for councilmembers, she resigned her seat on July 8, 2025, but will serve until a replacement is elected. The election is nonpartisan and elected citywide.

2025 Houston city council special election, At-large Position 4
Candidate	Votes	%
Alejandra Salinas	37,997	21.22
Dwight Boykins	35,944	20.07
Jordan Thomas	28,660	16.00
Sonia Rivera	18,993	10.60
Angie Thibodeaux	11,730	6.55
Martina Lemond Dixon	7,933	4.43
Sheraz Mohammad Siddiqui	6,668	3.72
Miguel Herrera	5,957	3.37
Kathy L. Tatum	5,440	3.04
J. Brad Batteau	5,028	2.81
Cris Wright	3,930	2.19
Ethan Hale	3,785	2.11
Al Lloyd	3,488	1.95
Adrian Thomas Rogers	3,474	1.94
Kristal Mtaza-Lyons (write-in)	76	0.04
Total votes	179,103	100.00%

2025 Houston city council special election, At-large Position 4 (runoff)
Candidate	Votes	%
Alejandra Salinas	25,753	59.26
Dwight Boykins	17,705	40.74
Total votes	43,458	100.00%

== Local elections ==
=== Fort Worth mayoral election ===
Incumbent Republican mayor Mattie Parker won re-election to a third term with 66.68% of the vote on May 3.

=== Garland mayoral election ===
Incumbent mayor Scott LeMay was term-limited and unable to run for re-election. Dylan Hedrick was elected with 51.70% of the vote on June 7 after advancing to a runoff election against Deborah Morris on May 3.

=== Plano municipal elections ===
Incumbent mayor John Muns won re-election to a third term unopposed on May 3. The city council also held elections to Places 2, 4, and 8 as well as a special election to Place 5.

Bob Kehr won election to Place 2 with 55.68% of the vote, Chris Krupa Downs won election to Place 4 with 54.96% of the vote, Steve Lavine won a special election to Place 5 with 57.70% of the vote, and Vidal Quintanilla won election to Place 8 with 53.90% of the vote.

=== San Antonio mayoral election ===
Incumbent mayor Ron Nirenberg was term-limited and unable to run for re-election. Democrat Gina Ortiz Jones was elected with 54.3% of the vote on June 7 after advancing to a runoff election against Republican Rolando Pablos on May 3.

=== Other mayoral elections ===
- Amarillo, Texas: Incumbent Republican Cole Stanley won re-election to a second-term.
- Beaumont, Texas: Incumbent Roy West was re-elected to a second term.
- Grand Prairie, Texas: Incumbent Republican Ron Jensen won re-election to a fifth term.
- McKinney, Texas: Incumbent George Fuller is ineligible to run for re-election due to term limits. Bill Cox was elected mayor, beating former Republican member of the Texas House of Representatives Scott Sanford.
- Richardson, Texas: Incumbent Bob Dubey lost re-election to Democrat Amir Omar.
- Sugar Land, Texas: Incumbent Joe R. Zimmerman is ineligible to run for re-election due to term limits. Carol McCutcheon was elected as mayor.

== See also ==
- 2025 United States state legislative elections
