= Dwight Boykins =

Texan politician

Member of the Houston City Council for District D
- In office January 2, 2014 – 2019
- Preceded by: Wanda Adams
- Succeeded by: Carolyn Evans-Shabazz

Personal details
- Born: Dwight Anthony Boykins; 1962 or 1963 (age 61–62) Houston, Texas, U.S.
- Political party: Democratic
- Spouse: Genora
- Education: Texas Southern University (BBA)

Dwight Anthony Boykins is an American lobbyist and politician who served as a Democratic member of the Houston City Council representing District D from 2014 to 2019. He left the Council to run for Mayor of Houston in the 2019 election and is a candidate in the 2025 special election for At-Large Position 4.

== Early life and education ==
Boykins grew up with six brothers and a single mother in the South Union neighborhood of Houston, Texas. He attended Stephen F. Austin High School and received a bachelor's degree in business from Texas Southern University.

== Career ==
Boykins career experience includes working as a lobbyist and consultant in Houston, Austin, and Washington, DC. In January 2020, he joined the Harris County District Attorney Kim Ogg's office working on community outreach for a second-chance program. He currently works as a consultant focused on government relations.

=== Houston City Council ===
Boykins was elected to the Houston City Council from District D in 2013, replacing incumbent Wanda Adams. He placed first in the primary with 43% of the vote and advanced to a runoff election against Georgia Provost. He was unopposed for re-election in 2015.

In 2015, he supported a proposal to change the city's term limits laws from 3 two year terms to 2 four year terms. He voted against the Houston Equal Rights Ordinance, saying voters should decide.

In 2016, Boykins apologized after cursing at a local container homes developer in a recorded incident.

In 2018, Boykins considered running for governor, but ultimately opted to stay in his position.

=== 2019 mayoral campaign ===
On June 8, 2019, Boykins officially announced his campaign for Mayor of Houston, criticizing incumbent Sylvester Turner over a dispute over firefighter pay. The Houston Professional Fire Fighters Association had endorsed him a few days earlier and state representative Mary Ann Perez endorsed him at his campaign kick-off event. During a speech at a youth summit in July, multiple students reported Boykins had told them to "keep their legs closed" and joked about dating one of them leading to a recorded confrontation by students over his conduct. He placed fourth in the nonpartisan election with 5.90% of the vote.

=== 2024 congressional candidacy ===
In 2024, Boykins announced his intention to run in the regular and special election to replace the late U.S. representative Sheila Jackson Lee but ultimately withdrew.

=== 2025 At-Large Position 4 special election campaign ===
Following incumbent At-Large Position 4 councilmember Letitia Plummer's announcement that she would run for county judge of Harris County in 2026, Boykins announced his campaign in the ensuing November 2025 special election caused by the city's resign-to-run laws. One of his opponents, attorney Alejandra Salinas, accused Boykins of copying her campaign platforms with an artificial intelligence large language model.

== Personal life ==
Boykins is a lifelong Democrat, but voted in the Republican primary in 2010 and previously contributed to Republican candidates such as Rick Perry. He resides in the Riverside Terrace neighborhood of Houston and owns a 12-acre property in Conroe with horses alongside his wife, retired attorney Genora. They are members of the Windsor Village United Methodist Church.

== Electoral history ==
Houston mayoral election, 2019
Candidate		Votes	%	±
✓	Sylvester Turner	111,789	46.38%	Runoff
✓	Tony Buzbee	69,361	28.78%	Runoff
	Bill King	33,772	14.01%	
	Dwight Boykins	14,212	5.90%	
	Victoria Romero	2,933	1.22%	
	Sue Lovell	2,932	1.22%	
	Demetria Smith	1,694	0.70%	
	Roy J. Vasquez	1,556	0.65%	
	Kendall Baker	982	0.41%	
	Derrick Broze	686	0.28%	
	Naoufal Houjami	560	0.23%	
	J. T. Taylor	555	0.23%	
Turnout		241,032	22.56%	
