= 2025–26 Texas's 18th congressional district special election =

- November 4, 2025 (first round); January 31, 2026 (runoff)

Texas's 18th congressional district
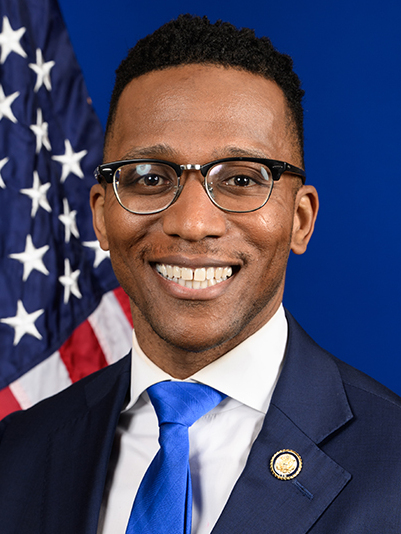

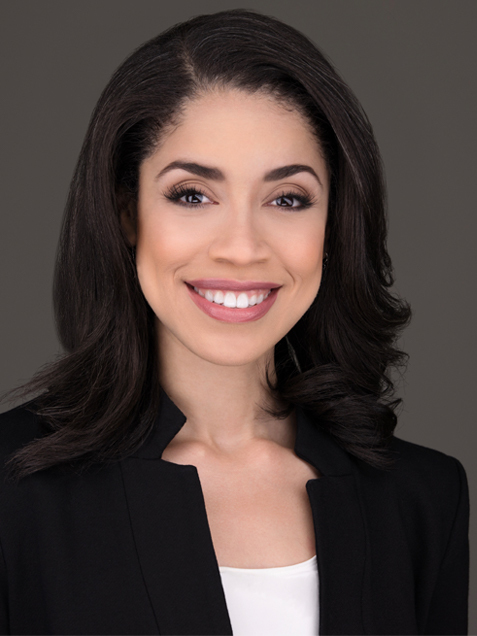

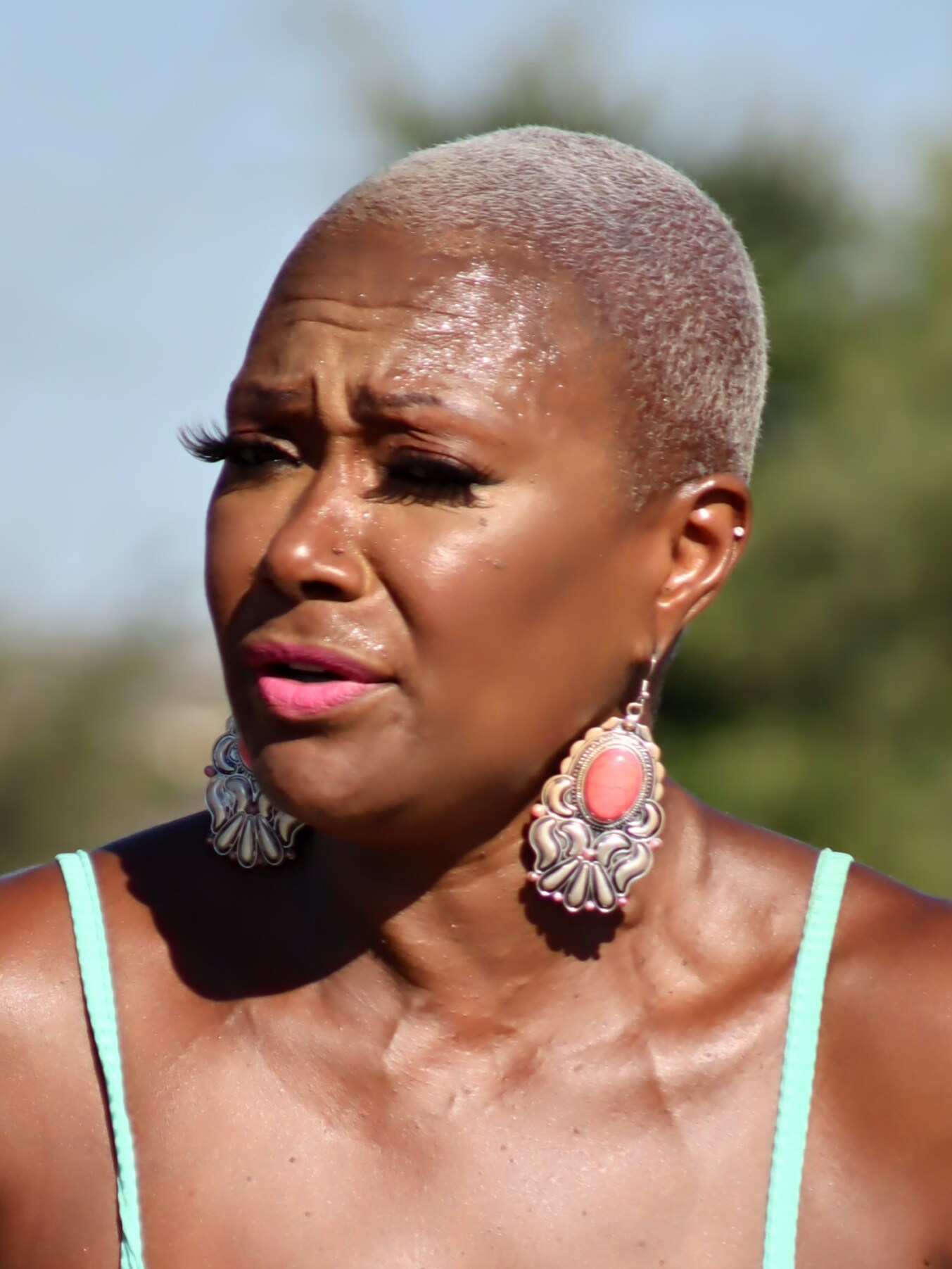

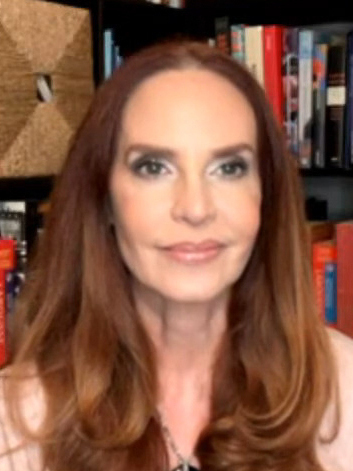

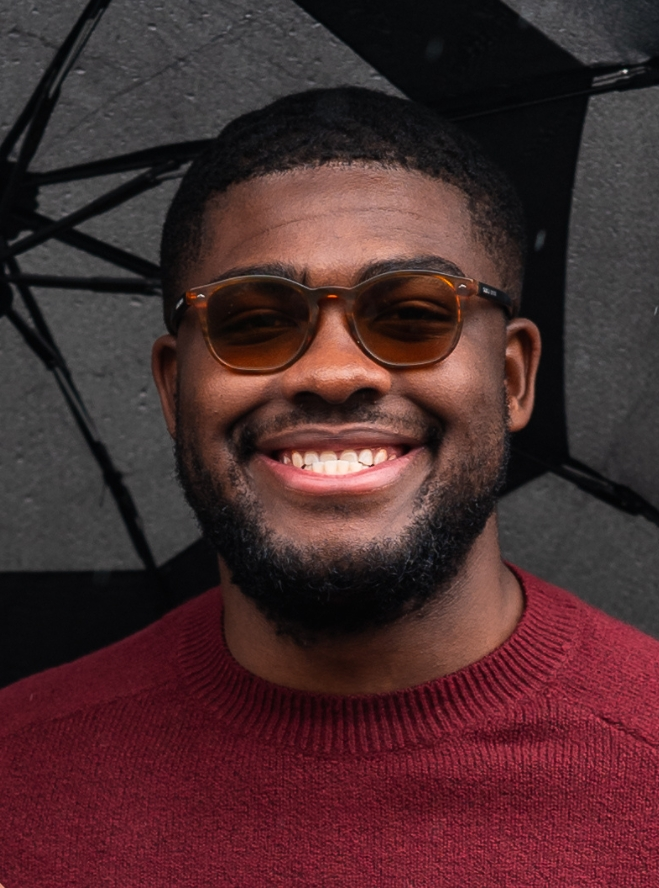
Candidate	Christian Menefee	Amanda Edwards	Jolanda Jones
Party	Democratic	Democratic	Democratic
First round	22,022; 28.90%	19,467; 25.55%	14,549; 19.10%
Runoff	18,646; 68.86%	8,434; 31.14%	Eliminated
Candidate	Carmen María Montiel	Isaiah Martin
Party	Republican	Democratic
First round	5,110; 6.71%	4,337; 5.69%
Runoff	Eliminated	Eliminated
- Menefee: 20–30% 30–40% 40–50% 50–60% 60–70% >90% Edwards: 20–30% 30–40% 40–50% Jones: 20–30% 30–40% 40–50% 50–60% Montiel: 20–30% 50–60% Tie 20–30% 30–40%
U.S. Representative before election
Sylvester Turner
Democratic
Elected U.S. Representative
Christian Menefee
Democratic

The 2025–26 Texas's 18th congressional district special election to determine the member of the United States House of Representatives for Texas's 18th congressional district was held on November 4, 2025. The seat became vacant following the death of Democrat Sylvester Turner on March 5, 2025. It is considered a safely Democratic district. This was the second special election to this seat in almost one year, the first being held in November 2024 after the July 2024 death of Representative Sheila Jackson Lee.

No candidate received a majority of the vote in the first round, leading to a runoff between the top two candidates: county attorney Christian Menefee and former city councilwoman Amanda Edwards. The runoff election was held on January 31, 2026 and Menefee was selected to succeed Turner to finish the term.

== Background ==
Incumbent Sylvester Turner died in office on March 5, 2025 from health complications, according to a statement released by his family. Turner had been elected in 2024 to Congress after serving as a two-term mayor of Houston. District 18 is a deeply blue urban district, with Turner winning the district with 69.4% of the vote. More than a month later, Governor Greg Abbott called for the special election to take place on November 4. Texas has no legal deadline for when special elections must take place, and many Democrats criticized Abbott, alleging he intentionally delayed the election to aid congressional Republicans, who hold a narrow majority in the House of Representatives.

The special election was conducted with all candidates on the ballot and was followed by a runoff because no candidate received a majority of the vote in the first round.

== Candidates ==
=== Democratic Party ===
==== Advanced to runoff ====
- Amanda Edwards, former at-large Houston city councilor (2016–2020), candidate for this district in the 2024 special and regular elections, and candidate for U.S. Senate in 2020
- Christian Menefee, Harris County attorney (2021–2026)

==== Eliminated in primary ====
- Feldon Bonner II, minister
- Stephen Huey, healthcare software engineer
- Jolanda Jones, state representative from the 147th district (2022–present) (endorsed Edwards in runoff)
- Isaiah Martin, government contract consultant and candidate for this district in 2024
- Valencia Williams, philanthropist

==== Withdrawn ====
- Zoe Cadore, former director of federal and regulatory affairs for Calpine
- Ebony Rain Eatmon, community advocate (endorsed Menefee)
- James Joseph, former director of civic engagement and community outreach for state senator Borris Miles (running for state house in 2026)
- Corisha Rogers, political organizer (endorsed Menefee)
- Robert Slater, president of the Southern Christian Leadership Conference Texas Chapter and candidate for this district in 2024 (running for the 29th district in 2026)

==== Declined ====
- Erica Lee Carter, former U.S. representative (2024–2025) (endorsed Menefee)
- Al Green, U.S. representative from Texas's 9th congressional district (2005–present) (Note: New mid-decade maps enacted by the Texas Legislature place Green in the new 18th district starting in 2027.)

=== Republican Party ===
==== Eliminated in primary ====
- Theodis Daniel, disabled veteran
- Ollie Knox, retiree
- Carmen María Montiel, former Miss Venezuela, candidate for Texas's 29th congressional district in 2018, and nominee for this district in 2022
- Carter Page, petroleum consultant and former foreign policy advisor for Donald Trump
- Ronald Whitfield, landscaping contractor

=== Green Party ===
==== Eliminated in primary ====
- Tammie Rochester, social worker

=== Independents ===
==== Eliminated in primary ====
- Reyna Anderson, former advisor to the Holy See Permanent Observer Mission to the U.N. (Note: Affiliated with the American Solidarity Party but listed on the ballot as an independent)
- Vince Duncan, carpentry contractor
- George Foreman IV, television personality and son of professional boxer George Foreman

== Primary ==
=== Endorsements ===
Amanda Edwards (D)

U.S. representatives

- Lois Frankel, U.S. representative from Florida's 22nd congressional district (2013–present)
- Jennifer McClellan, U.S. representative from Virginia's 4th congressional district (2023–present)
- Lateefah Simon, U.S. representative from California's 12th congressional district (2025–present)

Organizations

- Elect Democratic Women
- Emerge America
- EMILY's List
- Vote Common Good
Jolanda Jones (D)

U.S. representatives

- Bonnie Watson Coleman, U.S. representative from New Jersey's 12th congressional district (2015–present)
- Mark Takano, U.S. representative from California's 39th congressional district (2013–present)
- Ritchie Torres, U.S. representative from New York's 15th congressional district (2021–present)
- Craig Washington, former U.S. representative from Texas's 18th congressional district (1989–1995)

Organizations

- Equality PAC
- LGBTQ+ Victory Fund
Christian Menefee (D)

U.S. representatives

- Colin Allred, U.S. representative from Texas's 32nd congressional district (2019–2025)
- Erica Lee Carter, U.S. representative from Texas's 18th congressional district (2024–2025)
- Greg Casar, U.S. representative from Texas's 35th congressional district (2023–present)
- Jasmine Crockett, U.S. representative from Texas's 30th congressional district (2023–present)
- Lizzie Fletcher, U.S. representative from Texas's 7th congressional district (2019–present)
- Maxwell Frost, U.S. representative from Florida's 10th congressional district (2023–present)
- Pramila Jayapal, U.S. representative from Washington's 7th congressional district (2017–present)
- Beto O'Rourke, former U.S. representative from Texas's 16th congressional district (2013–2019)

State legislators

- Alma Allen, state representative from the 131st district (2005–present)
- Ana Hernandez, state representative from the 143rd district (2005–present)
- Jon Rosenthal, state representative from the 135th district (2019–present)
- James Talarico, state representative from the 50th district (2018–present)
- Armando Walle, state representative from the 140th district (2009–present)
- Royce West, former president pro tempore of the Texas Senate (2006–2007) from the 23rd district (1993–present)

County officials

- Rodney Ellis, Harris County commissioner (2017–present)
- Lina Hidalgo, Harris County judge (Note: County executive) (2019–present)

Local officials

- Dwight Boykins, former Houston city councilor from district D (2014–2019)
- Ronald Green, former Houston city controller (2010–2016)
- Chris Hollins, Houston city controller (2024–present)

Party officials

- David Hogg, former vice chair of the Democratic National Committee (2025)

Labor unions

- National Nurses United
- Texas Gulf Coast Area Labor Federation

Organizations

- Center for Freethought Equality
- College Democrats of America
- Congressional Progressive Caucus PAC
- Patriotic Millionaires
- People for the American Way
- Leaders We Deserve

Newspapers

- Houston Chronicle

=== Fundraising ===
Campaign finance reports as of October 15, 2025
Candidate	Raised	Spent	Cash on hand
Amanda Edwards (D)	$1,266,234	$935,650	$331,799
Stephen Huey (D)	$37,857	$26,092	$11,764
Jolanda Jones (D)	$341,647	$314,314	$27,333
Isaiah Martin (D)	$1,054,746	$961,678	$267,702
Christian Menefee (D)	$1,539,610	$1,146,989	$392,621
Carmen María Montiel (R)	$61,174	$41,065	$20,551
Reyna Anderson (I)	$8,225	$3,616	$4,609
George Foreman IV (I)	$8,454	$759	$7,695
Source: Federal Election Commission

=== Polling ===
Poll source	Date(s) administered	Sample size (Note: Key: A – all adults RV – registered voters LV – likely voters V – unclear)	Margin of error	Amanda Edwards (D)	George Foreman IV (I)	Jolanda Jones (D)	Isaiah Martin (D)	Christian Menefee (D)	Carmen Maria Montiel (R)	Other	Undecided
University of Houston/YouGov	October 7–11, 2025	1,200 (LV)	± 2.8%	23%	4%	15%	4%	27%	6%	8% (Note: Carter Page (R) with 3%; Ronald Whitfield (R) and "Seven Others (<1%)" with 2%; Theodis Daniel (R) with 1%)	13%
Blueprint Polling (D) (Note: Poll sponsored by Jones's campaign)	September 8–9, 2025	454 (V)	± 4.6%	10%	2%	25%	4%	14%	19%	2% (Note: "Someone else" with 2%)	25%
Lake Research Partners (D) (Note: Poll sponsored by Menefee's campaign)	August 20–25, 2025	400 (LV)	± 4.9%	15%	4%	22%	5%	22%	15%	–	14%
Brilliant Corners Research & Strategies (D) (Note: Poll sponsored by Edwards's campaign)	July 20–23, 2025	500 (LV)	± 4.4%	18%	6%	11%	3%	10%	12%	4%	36%
University of Houston	July 9–18, 2025	400 (LV)	± 4.9%	19%	4%	14%	3%	19%	14%	–	27%

=== Results ===
Special election results
Party	Candidate	Votes	%
Democratic	Christian Menefee	22,022	28.90
Democratic	Amanda Edwards	19,467	25.55
Democratic	Jolanda Jones	14,549	19.10
Republican	Carmen María Montiel	5,110	6.71
Democratic	Isaiah Martin	4,337	5.69
Republican	Ollie Knox	3,131	4.11
Democratic	Stephen Huey	1,415	1.86
Republican	Ronald Whitfield	1,175	1.54
Republican	Carter Page	943	1.24
Republican	Theodis Daniel	937	1.23
Democratic	Valencia Williams	915	1.20
Independent	George Foreman IV	828	1.09
Democratic	Feldon Bonner II	555	0.73
Independent	Vince Duncan	407	0.53
Independent	Reyna Anderson	263	0.35
Green	Tammie Rochester	135	0.18
Total votes		76,189	100.00

Per his constitutional duties as governor of Texas, Greg Abbott announced January 31, 2026, as the date for the runoff election. The announcement was made two weeks after the first round was held.

== Runoff ==
=== Post-primary endorsements ===
Amanda Edwards (D)

State legislators

- Jolanda Jones, state representative from the 147th district (2022–present) and former candidate for this district
Christian Menefee (D)

Labor unions

- Texas AFL-CIO

Organizations

- Sierra Club

Newspapers

- Houston Chronicle (Note: The Houston Chronicle endorsed Menefee prior to the primary, then formally re-endorsed him for the runoff.)

=== Fundraising ===
Campaign finance reports as of January 11, 2026
Candidate	Raised	Spent	Cash on hand
Amanda Edwards (D)	$1,740,159	$1,460,807	$280,565
Christian Menefee (D)	$2,225,235	$1,836,495	$388,739
Source: Federal Election Commission

=== Polling ===
Poll source	Date(s) administered	Sample size	Margin of error	Amanda Edwards (D)	Christian Menefee (D)	Other	Undecided
Lake Research Partners (D) (Note: Poll sponsored by Menefee's campaign)	December 8–14, 2025	437 (LV)	± 4.7%	30%	43%	–	13%
University of Houston/YouGov	October 7–11, 2025	1,200 (LV)	± 2.8%	34%	36%	10% (Note: "Not voting" with 10%)	20%

Hypothetical polling

Amanda Edwards vs. Jolanda Jones

Poll source	Date(s) administered	Sample size	Margin of error	Amanda Edwards (D)	Jolanda Jones (D)	Other	Undecided
University of Houston/YouGov	October 7–11, 2025	1,200 (LV)	± 2.8%	44%	26%	11% (Note: "Not voting" with 11%)	19%

Jolanda Jones vs. Christian Menefee

Poll source	Date(s) administered	Sample size	Margin of error	Jolanda Jones (D)	Christian Menefee (D)	Other	Undecided
University of Houston/YouGov	October 7–11, 2025	1,200 (LV)	± 2.8%	26%	43%	12% (Note: "Not voting" with 12%)	19%

=== Results ===
Special election runoff results
Party	Candidate	Votes	%
Democratic	Christian Menefee	18,646	68.86
Democratic	Amanda Edwards	8,434	31.14
Total votes		27,080	100.00
Democratic hold			

== See also ==
- 2025 United States House of Representatives elections
- 2026 United States House of Representatives elections
- List of special elections to the United States House of Representatives
- List of United States representatives from Texas
- 119th United States Congress

== Notes ==
Partisan clients
