= Erica Lee Carter =

American politician (born 1980)

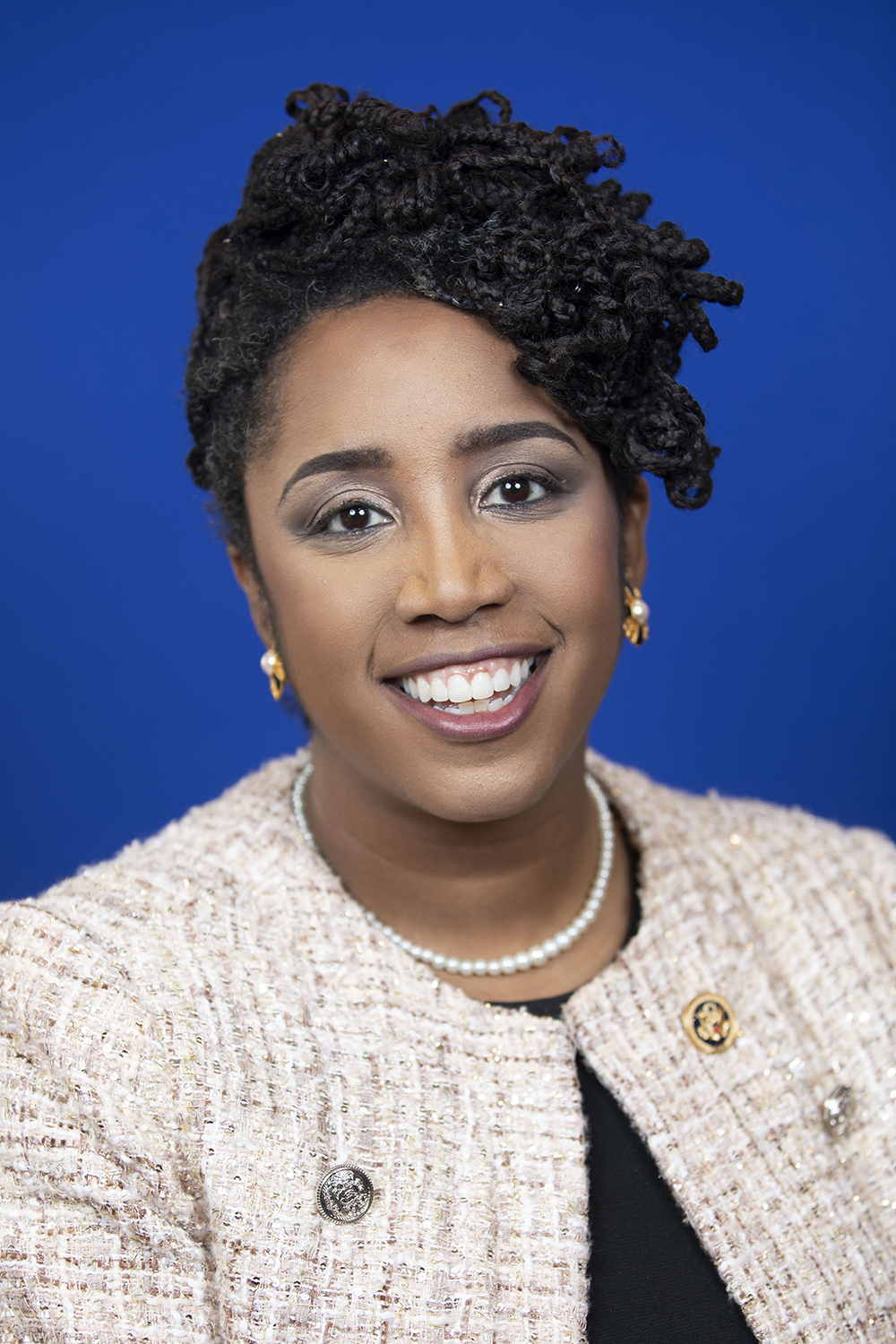
- Official portrait, 2024

Member of the U.S. House of Representatives from Texas's 18th district
- In office November 12, 2024 – January 3, 2025 (Note: Lee Carter's official service began on the date of the special election, but she was not sworn in until November 12, 2024.)
- Preceded by: Sheila Jackson Lee
- Succeeded by: Sylvester Turner

Personal details
- Born: Erica Shelwyn Lee; February 2, 1980 (age 46) Harris County, Texas, U.S.
- Party: Democratic
- Spouse: Roy Lee Carter Jr. (m. 2012)
- Children: 2
- Parent: Sheila Jackson Lee (mother)
- Education: University of North Carolina, Chapel Hill (BA); Duke University (MPP)

Erica Shelwyn Lee Carter (née Lee; born February 2, 1980) is an American politician who served as the U.S. representative for Texas's 18th congressional district as a member of the Democratic Party from 2024 to 2025.

The daughter of Sheila Jackson Lee, she worked as a teacher and quality coordinator before entering politics, serving on the board of trustees of the Harris County Department of Education from 2013 to 2019. In 2016, she ran to replace Borris Miles as a member of the Texas House of Representatives from the 146th district but lost when precinct chairs selected Shawn Thierry. After her mother's death in 2024, she initially endorsed Sylvester Turner to succeed Jackson Lee in both the special and general elections. However, she later announced her candidacy for the special election to finish her mother’s term, with Turner, who ran in the general election, withdrawing and endorsing her.

== Early life and education ==
Erica Shelwyn Lee was born on February 2, 1980 in Harris County, Texas, to Sheila Jackson Lee, a lawyer and politician, and Elwyn Lee, a law professor. Her brother is Jason Cornelius Bennett Lee.

She graduated with honors from the University of North Carolina at Chapel Hill with an undergraduate degree and later earned a Master of Public Policy from Duke University.

== Political career ==
Before running for office, she was a regional quality coordinator for a nonprofit public health organization and a teacher in the Houston Independent School District. She was on a team that helped prepare a $21 billion education budget for Eliot Spitzer when he was the governor of New York.

In 2011, Lee Carter filed to run for the first precinct of the Harris County Department of Education, saying that her decision to run was partly inspired by her family's involvement in public service. She went into a runoff with Jarvis Johnson, a former member of the Houston City Council, but thousands of voters were prevented from casting ballots due to a county error. She won the Democratic Party primary runoff election, although Johnson planned legal action on behalf of the voters who were excluded by the error. She faced Juliette Bartlett-Pack in the general election, whom Lee Carter later defeated to become a trustee.

In 2016, Lee Carter was a candidate to be a member of the Texas House of Representatives from the 146th district to replace Borris Miles, who had been selected to replace Rodney Ellis as a member of the Texas Senate from the 14th district. However, she was defeated by Shawn Thierry when the precinct chairs voted for the replacement.

She later became a policy director for Ellis.

== U.S. House of Representatives ==
On July 19, 2024, Sheila Jackson Lee died, leaving her congressional seat vacant. Greg Abbott, the governor of Texas, announced that a special election to fill the seat would be held on Election Day. Sylvester Turner, the former mayor of Houston, had been chosen as the Democratic Party's nominee for the election, with Lee Carter and her brother both endorsing him. However, Lee Carter later said she received encouragement from members of the community and community leaders to run for the election, and days after endorsing Turner she confirmed that she would be running to complete her mother's term in Congress, with Turner withdrawing from the special election and endorsing her. Lee Carter won the seat on November 5, 2024, and was sworn in on November 12, 2024, representing the 18th district until January 3, 2025. She was a member of the United States House Committee on the Judiciary in the 118th United States Congress.

2024 Texas's 18th congressional district special election
Party	Candidate	Votes	%
Democratic	Erica Lee Carter	146,413	67.94%
Republican	Maria Dunn	47,835	22.20%
Republican	Kevin Dural	21,257	9.86%
Total votes		215,505	100.00%
Democratic hold			

== Post-U.S. House of Representatives career ==
Lee Carter's successor Sylvester Turner died unexpectedly on March 5, 2025, and she was reported as a potential candidate for the special election. She declined, instead announcing that she would endorse and serve as honorary campaign chairperson for Harris County Attorney Christian Menefee.

On July 7, 2025, Lee Carter announced her intention to run for county judge of Harris County if the incumbent judge, Lina Hidalgo, chose not to run for re-election. Following Hidalgo's retirement announcement in September, Lee Carter stated she would not run.

== Personal life ==
She married Roy Lee Carter Jr. in November 2012 in Houston, with a reception attended by various Democratic politicians. She has two children, who are twins, Ellison Bennett Carter and Roy Lee Carter III.

U.S. House of Representatives
Preceded by Sheila Jackson Lee	Member of the U.S. House of Representatives from Texas's 18th congressional district 2024–2025	Succeeded by Sylvester Turner
U.S. order of precedence (ceremonial)
Preceded by Mayra Flores as Former U.S. Representative	Order of precedence of the United States as Former U.S. Representative	Succeeded by Katie Hill as Former U.S. Representative
