= Clint Hackney =

American politician (1952–2026)

Member of the Texas House of Representatives from the 139th district
- In office January 11, 1983 – January 10, 1989
- Preceded by: District created
- Succeeded by: Sylvester Turner

Member of the Texas House of Representatives from the 84th district
- In office January 13, 1981 – January 11, 1983
- Preceded by: Herman E. Lauhoff
- Succeeded by: Foster Whaley

Personal details
- Born: March 5, 1952 Lufkin, Texas, U.S.
- Died: October 21, 2026 (aged 74) Austin, Texas, U.S.
- Party: Democratic

Clint Hackney (March 5, 1952 – October 21, 2026) was an American politician who served in the Texas House of Representatives from 1981 to 1989.

Hackney died in Austin, Texas, on October 21, 2026, at the age of 74.
