= Houston LGBTQ+ Political Caucus =

U.S. civil rights organization

The Houston LGBTQ+ Political Caucus (also officially known as the HLGBTQPC) is the South's oldest civil rights organization dedicated solely to the advancement of gay, lesbian, bisexual and transgender rights. It was founded in 1975, and is the largest LGBTQ political organization in the city of Houston and Harris County. It is known locally simply as "The Caucus". The Caucus is nonpartisan and endorses candidates on the basis of their support for LGBTQ rights, regardless of political party or candidate's sexual orientation.

== Etymology ==
In 1977 it was known as the Texas Gay Political Caucus.

From 1980 to 1985 was known as the Houston Gay Political Caucus or simply the Gay Political Caucus. By 1991 it was known as the Houston Gay and Lesbian Political Caucus. On September 1, 2021, the membership of the organization voted to change the name from Houston GLBT Political Caucus to Houston LGBTQ+ Political Caucus in the spirit of diversity and inclusion.

== History ==
=== Founding and early years ===
The Caucus was founded in June 1975 by four dedicated gay and lesbian activists (Pokey Anderson, Bill Buie, Hugh Crell, and Keith McGee) long before gay rights became a major national issue. From its earliest moments, the organization emphasized electing candidates who were gay-friendly and had made specific commitments to support issues important to Houston's LGBTQ community. Its first president was Gary Van Ooteghem, who served from 1975 through the middle of 1977. A Houston Chronicle photo of early LGBTQ advocates Ray Hill, Pokey Anderson, Jerry Miller, and Rev. Bob Falls is often mistaken for being a picture of the founders of The Caucus because many early activists, including some of the true founders were very closeted and were afraid to have their photo published.

Don Hrachovy, who served as president in 1977 until his employer sent him to Saudi Arabia, worked to compile names and voter information for members of Houston's gay community and used it to build a mailing list. "The List" allowed the organization to mobilize effectively the gay community during elections and remains a powerful organizing tool today.

The screening committee was first chaired by Leland Marsters, who represented Precinct 34 (lower Westheimer) on the Harris County Democratic Executive Committee. His political experience was quite valuable to the new organization. For example, many leaders planned to attend a conference in San Antonio one weekend in May 1976. The Democratic primary was held on Saturday; it was crucial to re-elect state Rep. Ron Waters in the Montrose/Heights district. Marsters astutely urged everyone going out of town to vote absentee. He was a driving force in getting the Caucus involved in local politics.

In its early years, the group struggled to find candidates who would actively seek its endorsement, but members persisted in grassroots efforts, from printing endorsement cards to working the polls and many other activities. As the group demonstrated its ability to turn out LGBTQ and LGBTQ-friendly voters, more politicians sought its endorsement. The group made endorsements in the Houston municipal election, fall of 1975, and contributed to the re-election of Houston Mayor Fred Hofheinz. In 1977 it endorsed Kathy Whitmire, who won her race for City Controller.

In 1979, it endorsed Eleanor Tinsley, who was running for an at-large seat on city council; she defeated an incumbent who had been outspoken against LGBTQ rights. Sue Lovell, who was a leader in The Caucus at the time, recalls: "The then-Gay Political Caucus approached Eleanor Tinsley wanting to endorse her in her race for City Council At-Large Position 2 against 12-year incumbent Frank Mann. Many of the people who worked on her campaign advised her not to take the endorsement, because she would lose a lot of votes. Her response was, 'I believe I will gain more votes than I will lose, and it's the right thing to do. I want to be on the forefront of this civil rights movement.' Tinsley went on to win that race, becoming the first woman elected to Houston's city council in an at-large seat.

In 1981, the group experienced a turning point of sorts when it played an integral role in the election of Democrat Kathy Whitmire, who became the city's first woman mayor. Her support for LGBTQ issues drew criticism from conservatives in the city, but she refused to recant it and won four more elections with the group's support.

=== Success of openly gay candidates ===
By the 1990s, The Caucus was one of the most important political organizations in the city, with many candidates seeking its endorsement, especially on the Democratic side. In 1997, the group experienced another milestone with the election of Annise Parker to an at-large seat on Houston's city council. Parker had served as president of The Caucus in 1986. With the support of The Caucus, she became the first openly gay individual elected to citywide office in Houston. She was reelected to two more terms on city council, and in 2003 she launched a bid to become city controller, the second highest office in city government. She won that race, instantly becoming one of the highest-ranking gay officials in the country. In 2009 she was elected Mayor, re-elected 2011 and 2013.

In 2005, The Caucus enjoyed another important victory when Sue Lovell was elected to an at-large seat on city council. Another past president of The Caucus (fall 1984 through 1985), she became the second openly gay person to win citywide election. She was reelected in 2007 and 2009 with the support of The Caucus and served through 2011, when the City Charter limited her terms in office.

Lane Lewis was president of The Caucus in 1997. He was appointed as Chair of the Harris County Democratic Party to fill a vacancy, re-elected May 2012 and May 2014.

=== Annise Parker becomes mayor ===
By far the biggest triumph of the organization was the election of Annise Parker as mayor of Houston in 2009. The Caucus endorsed Parker early in her bid to become the first openly gay mayor of a major American city, and its members provided much of the grassroots strength of her campaign. She led the general election and earned a spot in the run-off, where she defeated lawyer Gene Locke by a 53–47 margin to make history. Her election was particularly meaningful to the city's LGBTQ community, given the fact that conservative organizations attacked her on the basis of her sexual orientation during the campaign. While she never sought support solely on the basis of her orientation, she also never shied away from it, insisting that, "Voters will elect me knowing that I'm gay and that it will mean a lot to my community."

However, when Parker left office in January 2016, despite her strong commitment and substantial financial support of the organization, then-president of The Caucus, Maverick Welsh publicly rebuked her in an article published by the Houston Chronicle, stating:

She was very contemptuous, not just of council. I didn't have a conversation with her in the two years I was president of The Caucus. She's a very smart woman, but I think if you're going to be a really successful mayor you have to have a much more collaborative style. This tendency to micromanage and try to control the outcome, that builds up resistance over time.

== Current role ==
The Caucus continues to mobilize the city's LGBTQ and LGBTQ-friendly voters, elect pro-equality candidates, and influence local, state, and national elections. Although the organization is nonpartisan, Republican candidates have mostly shied away from seeking its endorsement. But The Caucus continues to welcome any candidate who is willing to stand against discrimination and to support equal rights for LGBTQ individuals.

The main roles that the organization fills are screening and endorsing candidates, registering voters, organizing efforts to turn out the LGBTQ vote (including block walks, phone banks, and other grassroots activities), and holding elected officials accountable for their actions once in office. One of the most prominent current issues facing The Caucus is an effort to enact local protections against discrimination for the LGBTQ community.

On January 6, 2016, The Caucus membership elected attorney Fran Watson as its president. Watson is the first African-American woman to serve as president. Mike Webb was elected as president in 2018 and is the organization's first genderqueer identifying president.
