= 2019 Houston mayoral election =

American municipal election

- November 5, 2019 (first round); December 14, 2019 (runoff)
- Turnout: 22.56% (first round); 18.73% (runoff)
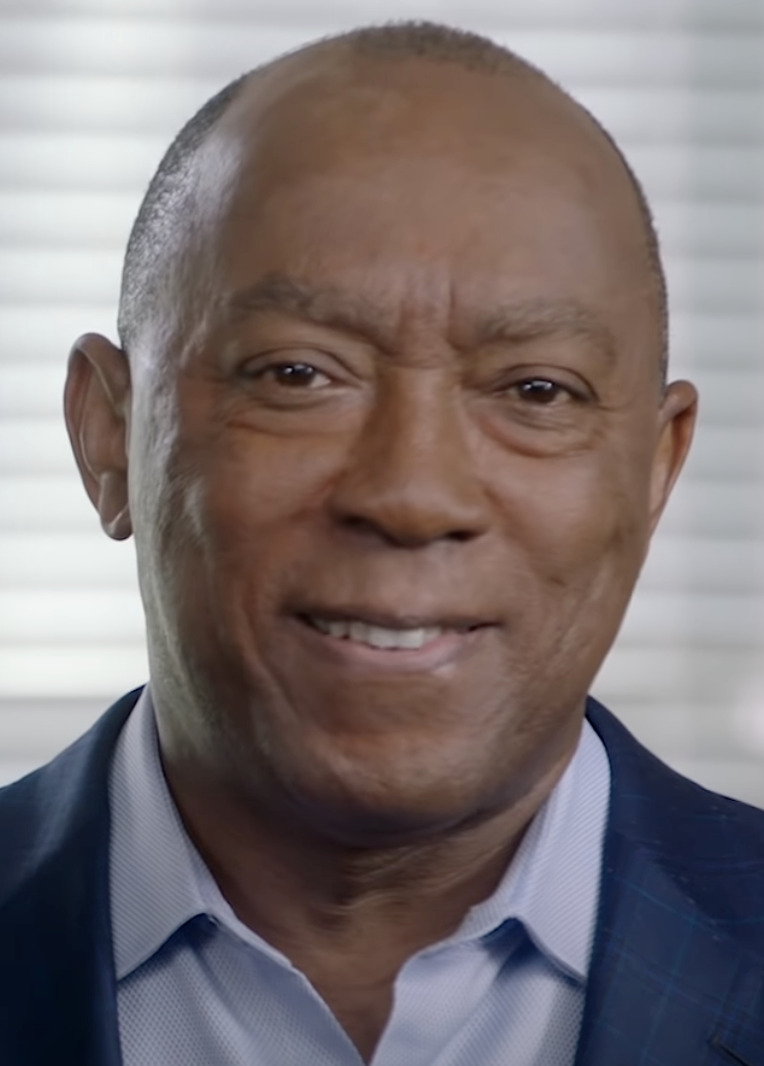

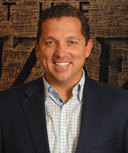

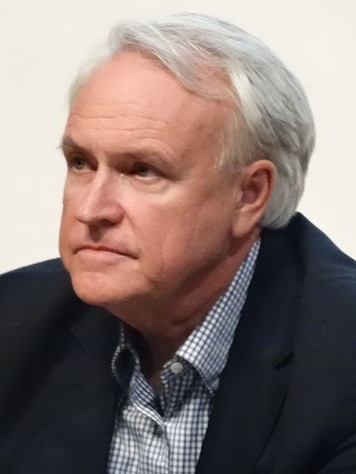
Candidate	Sylvester Turner	Tony Buzbee
First round	111,789; 46.38%	69,361; 28.78%
Runoff	113,262; 56.04%	88,844; 43.96%
Candidate	Bill King	Dwight Boykins
First round	33,772; 14.01%	14,212; 5.90%
Runoff	Eliminated	Eliminated
Mayor before election
Sylvester Turner
Elected mayor
Sylvester Turner

The 2019 Houston mayoral election was decided by a runoff that took place on December 14, 2019. Incumbent mayor Sylvester Turner defeated attorney Tony Buzbee in the runoff by a margin of 56.04% to 43.96%. No candidate won a majority of the vote during the general election on November 5, 2019, when Turner received 46% of the vote and Buzbee received 29%.

== Declared candidates ==
The following candidates ran for mayor of Houston in 2019:

=== Candidates ===
==== Incumbent ====
- Sylvester Turner, Mayor of Houston, elected to his first term in the 2015 mayoral election

==== Challengers ====
In September 2019, it was announced that Mayor Turner and 11 other candidates would appear on the mayoral ballot.

- Derrick Broze, author and activist
- Tony Buzbee, attorney
- Bill King - businessman, former mayor of Kemah, and 2015 mayoral candidate
- Booker T, professional wrestler, promoter, and color commentator. By September 2019, his legal name of Booker Huffman was not among those who applied for the ballot.
- Dwight Boykins, current Houston City Councilman, District D
- Sue Lovell, former Houston City Councilwoman, at-large seat 2

== Election results ==
Held November 5, 2019 -- 50% needed to avoid runoff

Houston mayoral election, 2019
Candidate		Votes	%	±
✓	Sylvester Turner	111,789	46.38%	Runoff
✓	Tony Buzbee	69,361	28.78%	Runoff
	Bill King	33,772	14.01%	
	Dwight Boykins	14,212	5.90%	
	Victoria Romero	2,933	1.22%	
	Sue Lovell	2,932	1.22%	
	Demetria Smith	1,694	0.70%	
	Roy J. Vasquez	1,556	0.65%	
	Kendall Baker	982	0.41%	
	Derrick Broze	686	0.28%	
	Naoufal Houjami	560	0.23%	
	J. T. Taylor	555	0.23%	
Turnout		241,032	22.56%	

Held December 14, 2019

Houston mayoral runoff election, 2019
Candidate		Votes	%	±
✓	Sylvester Turner	113,262	56.04%	
	Tony Buzbee	88,844	43.96%	
Turnout		202,106	18.73%	
