= Letitia Plummer =

American politician

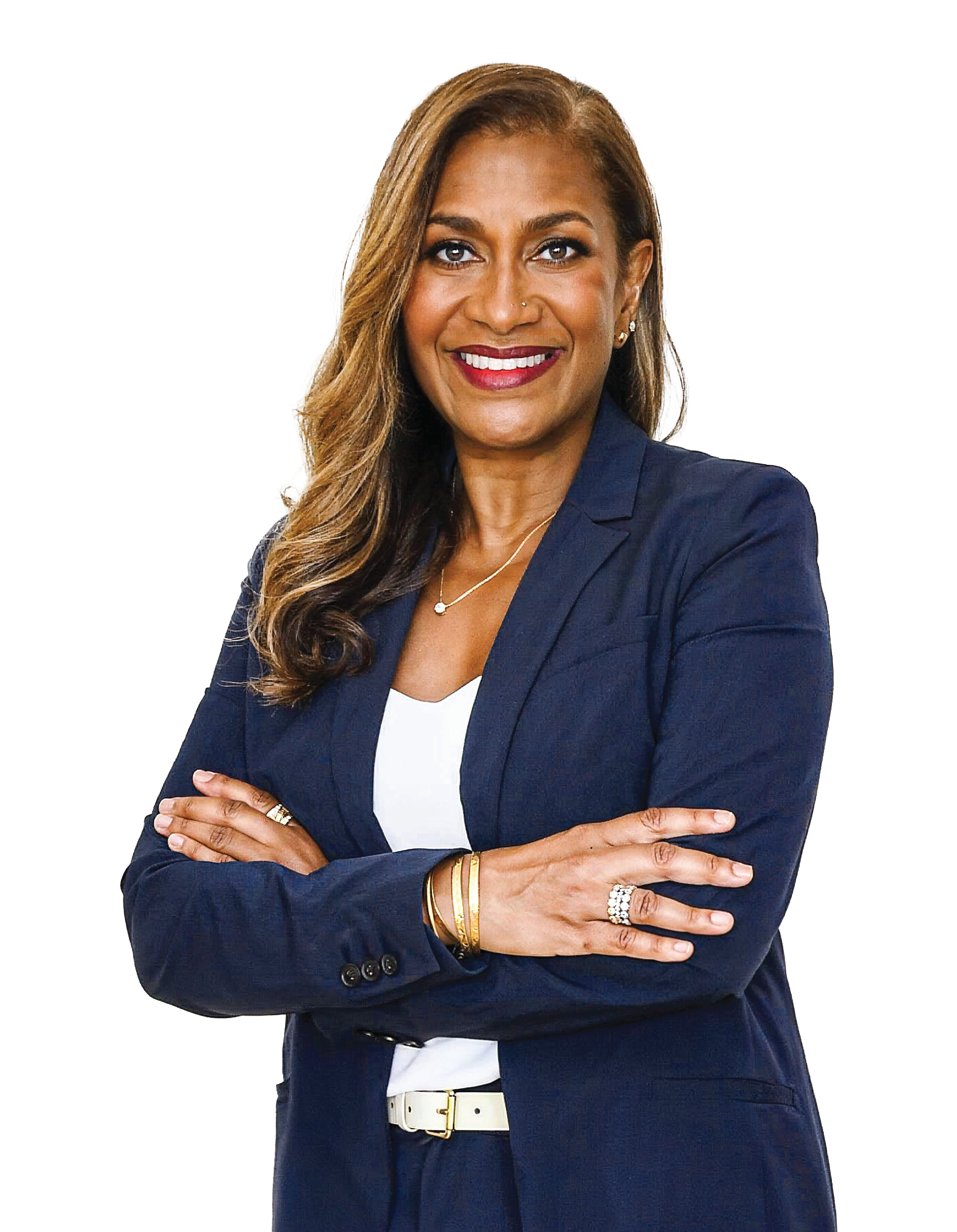
- Plummer in 2026

Harris County Judge-elect
- Assuming office January 1, 2027
- Succeeding: Lina Hidalgo

Member of Houston City Council from the at-large district Position 4
- In office January 2, 2020 – December 2025
- Preceded by: Amanda Edwards
- Succeeded by: Alejandra Salinas

Personal details
- Born: 1970 (age 55–56)
- Party: Democratic
- Children: 3
- Education: Spelman College (BA); Baylor College of Dentistry (DDS)

Letitia Latifa Plummer (born 1970) is an American dentist and politician who served as a member of the Houston City Council representing the At-Large Position 4 from 2020 to 2025. She is the first Muslim woman to be elected to the council. In July 2025, she announced her campaign for County Judge of Harris County in 2026. Due to Texas's resign-to-run laws for local offices, she resigned her seat on the city council on July 8, 2025, but remained in the position until Alejandra Salinas was elected in a December 2025 special election. She was elected in November 2026.

== Early life, education, and career ==
Plummer was born in 1970 to a Zanzibar-born Yemeni-Indian and Persian mother and an African American father. The two met while her father served in the Peace Corps. Her paternal grandfather was a civil rights lawyer who represented Muhammad Ali and U.S. Representative Mickey Leland was a family friend.

The family moved to Houston in 1973 and she grew up in the Linkwood neighborhood, where Plummer graduated from the DeBakey High School for Health Professions. She went on to graduate from the historically black Spelman College, where she was a member of the Alpha Kappa Alpha sorority, and then from the Baylor College of Dentistry.

Plummer practiced dentistry with the Harris Health System then opened her own practice in 2001. She currently has two offices in Pearland and Houston. She founded the nonprofit, Career Smiles, to repair people's teeth when they are searching for jobs.

== Political career ==
Plummer waves at the Acres Homes Annual Juneteenth Parade on June 21, 2025.

Prior to running for public office, Plummer had worked on political campaigns, lobbied the Texas Legislature on adoption and surrogacy rights, and worked on Hillary Clinton's 2016 presidential campaign as a fundraiser and was a member of its small business task force.

=== Congressional campaigns ===
==== 2018 ====
Plummer ran for the U.S. House of Representatives in 2018, running for the Democratic nomination in Texas's 22nd congressional district. She placed second in the primary election behind by former diplomat Sri Preston Kulkarni, who defeated her in the primary runoff election.

==== 2024 ====
Following Sheila Jackson Lee's death, Plummer sought the Harris County Democrat's nomination to replace her on the November 2024 general election ballot. She was eliminated on the first round at the party's convention, placing third with 5 votes behind eventual winner Sylvester Turner and runner-up Amanda Edwards respectively.

=== Houston City Council ===
Plummer ran for the Houston City Council's At-Large Position 4 in a 2019 special election to replace Amanda Edwards, who resigned to run for U.S. Senate in 2020. She advanced from the nonpartisan primary alongside Republican Anthony Dolcefino then narrowly defeated him in a run-off election with 51.9% of the vote. She was sworn in on January 2, 2020, and became the first Muslim to serve in the body.

During the COVID-19 pandemic, Plummer and other city councilmembers supported an emergency eviction grace period for tenants which mayor Sylvester Turner opposed.

In 2022, Plummer voted against the city adopting ShotSpotter but later stated her support for the technology a year later. She criticized Houston Metro board of directors' decision to postpone the METRORapid University Line in 2024.

Due to Texas' resign-to-run law, Plummer automatically resigned from the council on July 8, 2025, but will serve in the position until a successor is named. Plummer timed her campaign announcement to allow a special election to be held alongside the regularly scheduled 2025 Texas elections on November 4, avoiding the extra cost of a standalone election paid by the city.

=== 2026 Harris County Judge campaign ===
On July 8, 2025, Plummer officially announced her campaign for County Judge of Harris County in the 2026 elections. She stated she was running as a progressive, emphasizing disaster preparedness and securing infrastructure funding if elected. She joins former mayor of Houston Annise Parker in the Democratic primary race. Incumbent Judge Lina Hidalgo is retiring. On May 26, 2026, she won her primary run-off election against Annise Parker and will face Republican candidate Orlando Sanchez in the November general election. Plummer won in the general election.

== Personal life ==
Plummer is Muslim and has described herself as coming from a mixed-faith family. She has three sons and had a fourth via surrogacy in 2014; her ex-husband, an attorney, received full custody of the fourth during their divorce after never filing to give Plummer her parental rights.

Her brother, Farouk, worked as an unpaid advisor in her council office until he had his credentials revoked for posting pictures of councilmembers' personal cars online when he alleged they had violated the Texas Open Meetings Act in 2020.

== Electoral history ==
=== 2018 ===
2018 Texas' 22nd congressional district Democratic primary results
Party	Candidate	Votes	%
Democratic	Sri Preston Kulkarni	9,466	31.8
Democratic	Letitia Plummer	7,230	24.3
Democratic	Steve Brown	6,246	21.0
Democratic	Margarita Ruiz Johnson	3,767	12.7
Democratic	Mark Gibson	3,046	10.2
Total votes		29,755	100.0

2018 Texas' 22nd congressional district Democratic primary runoff results
Party	Candidate	Votes	%
Democratic	Sri Preston Kulkarni	9,502	62.1
Democratic	Letitia Plummer	5,794	37.9
Total votes		15,296	100.0

=== 2019 ===
2019 Houston city council election, At-large Position 4
Candidate	Votes	%
Anthony Dolcefino	39,627	20.90
Letitia Plummer	20,223	15.94
Nick Hellyar	24,068	12.69
Ericka McCrutcheon	21,195	11.18
Bill Baldwin	20,276	10.69
Javier Gonzalez	15,912	8.39
Jennifer Laney	11,589	6.11
James "Joe" Joseph	11,054	5.83
Jason Rowe	6,347	3.35
Christel Bastida	5,017	2.65
Tiko Hausman	4,288	2.26
Total votes	189,596	100.00%

2019 Houston city council election, At-large Position 4 (runoff)
Candidate	Votes	%
Letitia Plummer	88,522	51.84
Anthony Dolcefino	82,222	48.16
Total votes	170,744	100.00%

=== 2023 ===
2023 Houston city council election, At-large Position 4
Candidate	Votes	%
Letitia Plummer	93,894	47.97
Roy Morales	65,046	33.23
Andrew "Drew" Patterson	21,189	10.83
John Branch Jr.	15,594	7.97
Total votes	195,723	100.00%

2023 Houston city council election, At-large Position 4 (runoff)
Candidate	Votes	%
Letitia Plummer	90,362	52.19
Roy Morales	82,792	47.81
Total votes	173,154	100.00%

=== 2024 ===
2024 Texas' 18th congressional district Democratic convention results
Candidate	First ballot		Second ballot	
Candidate	Votes	%	Votes	%
Sylvester Turner	35	44.3%	41	52.6%
Amanda Edwards	34	43.0%	37	47.4%
Letitia Plummer	5	6.3%	Eliminated	
Christina Morales	3	3.8%	Eliminated	
Jarvis Johnson	2	2.5%	Eliminated	
Total	79	100.0%	78	100.0%
