= Tony Buzbee =

American lawyer and politician (born 1968)

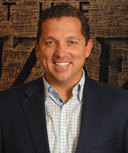
- Born: Anthony Glenn Buzbee; June 1, 1968 (age 58); Atlanta, Texas, U.S.
- Education: Texas A&M University (BS); University of Houston (JD)
- Spouses: Zoe Benson (m. 1991; div. 2017) Frances Moody (m. 2021)
- Children: 4
- Website: txattorneys.com

Anthony Glenn Buzbee (born June 1, 1968) is an American lawyer and political figure. In 2019, Buzbee ran for mayor of Houston, Texas, but lost to incumbent Sylvester Turner. He also ran for Houston City Council in 2023, but lost to incumbent Mary Nan Huffman.

== Early life and education ==
Buzbee grew up in Atlanta, Texas, on a farm with his parents and three siblings. Buzbee earned a bachelor of science degree in psychology from Texas A&M University and a juris doctor degree from the University of Houston Law Center. Buzbee was the battalion commander of the NROTC Midshipman Battalion and a member of the Texas A&M Corps of Cadets.

After graduation Buzbee joined the Marine Corps serving in the Persian Gulf and Somalia first as an infantry officer and later as a reconnaissance officer.

== Career ==
He began his legal career as an attorney at Susman Godfrey LLP in Houston. In 2000, he founded the Buzbee Law Firm.

Buzbee appeared on the cover of The New York Times magazine in November 2010 regarding his role in the litigation against BP following the Deepwater Horizon oil spill in the Gulf of Mexico. The article described him as "one of the most successful trial lawyers in Texas". In 2017, Buzbee represented the family of a victim of an oil-rig explosion. As of April 6, 2021, Buzbee represents at least twenty-one clients alleging sexual misconduct against NFL quarterback Deshaun Watson. In 2021, Buzbee filed a $750 million lawsuit against rapper Travis Scott on behalf of 120 victims who died or were injured during the Astroworld Festival crowd crush.

Buzbee is also a property developer. He owns Buzbee Properties, a real-estate firm focused on various suburbs in the Greater Houston area. He also owns some properties in Florida.

In 2023, the Texas House of Representatives impeached Texas Attorney General Ken Paxton and he was suspended from office pending the outcome of the trial in the Senate. Buzbee was brought on to lead the defense team. On September 16, 2023, the Texas Senate acquitted Paxton on all 16 impeachment articles, allowing him to return to office.

In 2023, Buzbee and Washington Ho started a line of THC-infused seltzers named HoBuzz.

Buzbee was the lead trial attorney for Rebecca Grossman, who was convicted of second-degree murder in Los Angeles in 2024 after a 2020 hit-and-run that killed two brothers. He argued that former professional baseball pitcher Scott Erickson had struck the children first while racing Grossman.

=== Sean Combs and Shawn Carter sexual misconduct lawsuit ===
In 2024, Buzbee began representing more than 50 plaintiffs in lawsuits alleging sexual abuse by Sean "Diddy" Combs. The same year, a prominent celebrity figure filed a lawsuit against Buzbee and his firm in connection with the Combs lawsuits. The lawsuit claims that Buzbee was "shamelessly attempting to extort exorbitant sums from him," while threatening a lawsuit packed with "entirely fabricated and malicious allegations of sexual assault — including multiple incidents of rape of a minor, both male and female — against Plaintiff if he refuses to comply with their demands."

In December 2024, one of the lawsuits originally filed against Combs was refiled to include rapper Jay-Z (Shawn Carter) as a defendant. The lawsuit alleged that both Combs and Carter were involved in the rape of a 13-year-old girl in 2000. On December 18, 2024, Buzbee filed a lawsuit against Carter's company Roc Nation, law firm Quinn Emanuel, which employs Carter's attorneys, and others, claiming that these parties were attempting to sway his clients into suing his firm, The Buzbee Law Firm, and himself.

According to Buzbee, Roc Nation paid off some of his former clients to file bogus lawsuits, while Quinn Emanuel orchestrated the scheme. Buzbee stated that he had, among other things, audio tapes proving his allegation against Roc Nation and Quinn Emanuel, and would provide the tapes as evidence.

An investigation by NBC News reported inconsistencies in the plaintiff’s account, which she described as mistakes. The plaintiff later filed a motion to dismiss with prejudice. However, she still maintains that the allegations are true and that she only filed a motion to dismiss due to intimidation and fear of retribution; after she was allegedly approached by two investigators working for Carter's lawyers who tried to get her to sign an affidavit stating that her rape claims were false, which she refused. In a recording of the conversation obtained by ABC News, the plaintiff said that Carter had not assaulted her and that Buzbee had pushed her to sue Carter. Buzbee denied pressuring her. The plaintiff said she felt intimidated by the investigators’ visit. Carter’s lawyer, Alex Spiro, denied that the investigators had threatened her and said she spoke with them voluntarily. In March 2025, Carter sued the woman and Buzbee for defamation. In July 2025, Jay-Z's defamation lawsuit against Buzbee was deemed meritless and dismissed by a LA Superior Court judge in what Buzbee described as a "well-reasoned opinion" and deemed a legal victory.

In June 2026, a Texas state court dismissed lawsuits filed by Buzbee, ruling that the court lacked personal jurisdiction over the defendants. The lawsuits alleged that representatives of Roc Nation and Carter's legal team improperly encouraged former Buzbee clients to file claims against him. Buzbee intended to appeal the decision.

=== Shannon Sharpe sexual assault lawsuit ===
In April 2025, a Nevada woman represented by Buzbee filed a $50+ million lawsuit against NFL Hall of Fame player and sports media personality Shannon Sharpe, accusing him of rape, physical abuse, and making violent threats. In reaction to the lawsuit, Sharpe accused Buzbee of orchestrating a "shakedown" and that Buzbee "targets" Black men. Sharpe eventually reached a private, out of court, settlement with the plaintiff and Buzbee in exchange for dismissing the lawsuit with prejudice.

== Politics ==
In 2002, Buzbee unsuccessfully ran for the 24th district of the Texas State House as a Democrat, losing to Republican Larry Taylor by 17 points. From August 2003 to April 2005, Buzbee was chair of the Galveston County Democratic Party.

In 2012, Buzbee supported Rick Perry's presidential campaign with financial support and the use of his private jet. Buzbee also served as one of Perry's debate coaches. In 2016, Buzbee hosted a fundraiser at his River Oaks mansion for then presidential candidate Donald Trump. Later on, following the release of the Access Hollywood tape, Buzbee disavowed Trump and stated his intention to write in veteran Dan Moran for president. Subsequently, Buzbee gave $500,000 to Trump's inauguration committee.

=== Houston mayoral run ===
On October 30, 2018, Buzbee announced he would be running in the 2019 Houston mayoral election, challenging incumbent Houston Mayor Sylvester Turner on a platform of universal prekindergarten, infrastructure improvement, crime reduction, and expanding access to 5G broadband. On October 17, Turner accused Buzbee's campaign of running a "deepfake ad". Following the November 5 election, Buzbee garnered 28% of the vote, enough to make it into a runoff with Turner who had 47% of the vote in unofficial returns. Buzbee lost to Turner in the runoff election.

=== Houston City Council race ===
On August 21, 2023, Buzbee filed to run for the Houston City Council seat for District G. In the general election, Buzbee placed second with 41.31%, advancing to a runoff against incumbent Mary Huffman who earned 49.42% of the vote. Buzbee lost the runoff to Huffman with the latter receiving a little over 56% of the vote.

== Personal life ==
Buzbee married Zoe Benson in 1991, and they have four children together. The marriage ended in divorce in 2017. Buzbee became engaged to Frances Moody in 2020, and they were married in 2021.

In March 2016, Buzbee was arrested in Harris County on charges related to driving while intoxicated. By December, the Harris County district attorney had dismissed the case, though controversy ensued due to Buzbee completing a year-long probation program in just eight months and his previous financial contributions to the district attorney's 2014 election campaign.

The following year, Buzbee garnered public attention for parking a fully operational World War II-era Sherman M4A4 tank, named Cheyenne, on Houston's River Oaks Boulevard. This incident led to a series of parking citations and a conflict with the River Oaks Property Owners' Association, resulting in the tank's eventual relocation to Texarkana.

In February 2021, while Buzbee's River Oaks home was under renovations and he stayed at the Four Seasons and Post Oak Hotel in Houston, he decided to sleep on the streets during an Arctic storm to "prove a point and raise awareness".

Buzbee was accused of giving a sexually transmitted infection to a woman in a lawsuit filed in the New York Supreme Court in December 2024. She alleged that Buzbee asked her to not disclose testing positive after a doctor confirmed she had a venereal disease and offered her legal advice as compensation. Buzbee claimed that the lawsuit was a "conspiracy".
