= Amanda Edwards =

American politician (born 1982)

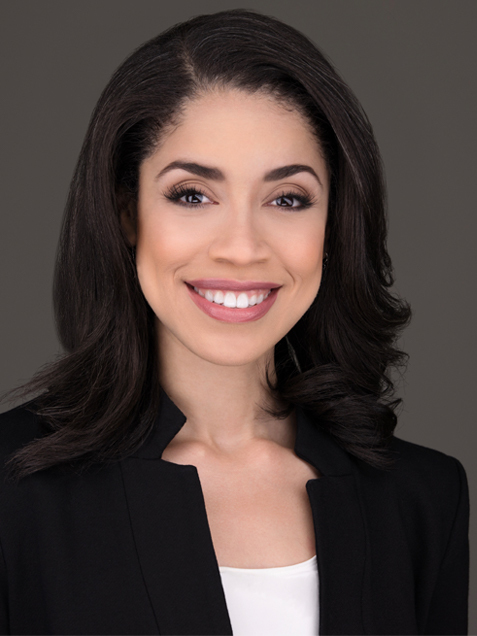

Member of the Houston City Council from the at-large district Position 4
- In office January 2, 2016 – January 2, 2020
- Preceded by: Clarence Bradford
- Succeeded by: Letitia Plummer

Personal details
- Born: January 19, 1982 (age 44) Houston, Texas, U.S.
- Party: Democratic
- Education: Emory University (BA); Harvard University (JD)

Amanda Kay Edwards (born January 19, 1982) is an American attorney and politician who served as a member of the Houston City Council from 2016 to 2020. She was a candidate for the 2020 United States Senate election in Texas in the Democratic primary and briefly ran in the 2023 Houston mayoral election before making a pivot to run for the U.S. House of Representatives in 2024. She was a candidate for the U.S. House in the 2025–26 special election to fill in the vacancy left by Sylvester Turner's death, ultimately losing the runoff to Christian Menefee.

== Education and early career ==
Edwards was born and raised in Houston. After graduating from Eisenhower High School, she continued on to Emory University, where she earned a Bachelor of Arts in Political Science. While at Emory, Edwards served as president of the undergraduate student body and was later inducted into the Emory University Hall of Fame. She also spent her time at Emory assisting Georgia State Senator Connie Stokes. After graduating from Emory, Edwards moved to Washington, D.C. and began working for Congresswoman Sheila Jackson Lee.

From there, she went on to attain a Juris Doctor from Harvard Law School. Edwards became a Criminal Justice Institute student attorney. She was also recognized with the Elaine Osborne Jacobson Award for her work in supporting underserved communities in healthcare law. This was in addition to her duties as the Co-Chair of the Harvard Black Law Students Association Spring Conference.

After graduation, her interest in public service led Edwards to relocate to New Orleans in the aftermath of Hurricane Katrina, where she served as a judicial law clerk for Federal District Court Judge Ivan Lemelle. While in New Orleans, Edwards founded Project NOW: The New Orleans Writing Project to teach New Orleans Youth how to use writing as a tool of empowerment after Hurricane Katrina.

Ultimately, Edwards returned to Houston, where she practiced as a municipal finance attorney. She has focused primarily on public finance, involving bond issuances, government partnerships, non-profit organizations, and community-development organizations.

== Public office ==
=== Houston City Council ===
Edwards ran for Houston City Council in 2015 for At-Large Position 4 and won, succeeding C.O. Bradford. In the runoff, she received more votes than anyone in the municipal election, including the mayor, Sylvester Turner. During her tenure, Edwards served on the Transportation, Technology, and Infrastructure Committee and the Economic Development Committee; additionally, she was the Vice Chair of the Budget and Fiscal Affairs Committee.

In the spring of 2016, Edwards authored an amendment for the city's annual budget process to create a task force for innovation and technology. She helped lead the efforts of the Task Force, which recommended, among other things, the creation of an innovation district. This new site, The Ion, supports the business district and accelerate investment in innovative technologies. She also pushed efforts for the City of Houston to commence smart city planning.

In addition to her work to support the innovation economy, Edwards initiated the creation of and led the Women- and Minority-Owned Business Task Force to identify ways to increase access to capital for women- and minority-owned businesses.

Edwards also served as the Co-Vice Chair of the High-Capacity Transit Task Force (a group organized under the Houston-Galveston Area Council) where she advocated for high capacity transit options for the 8 county Houston-Galveston region. This was alongside her proposal for the addition of light rail and rapid transit options to ease congestion on Houston's highways.

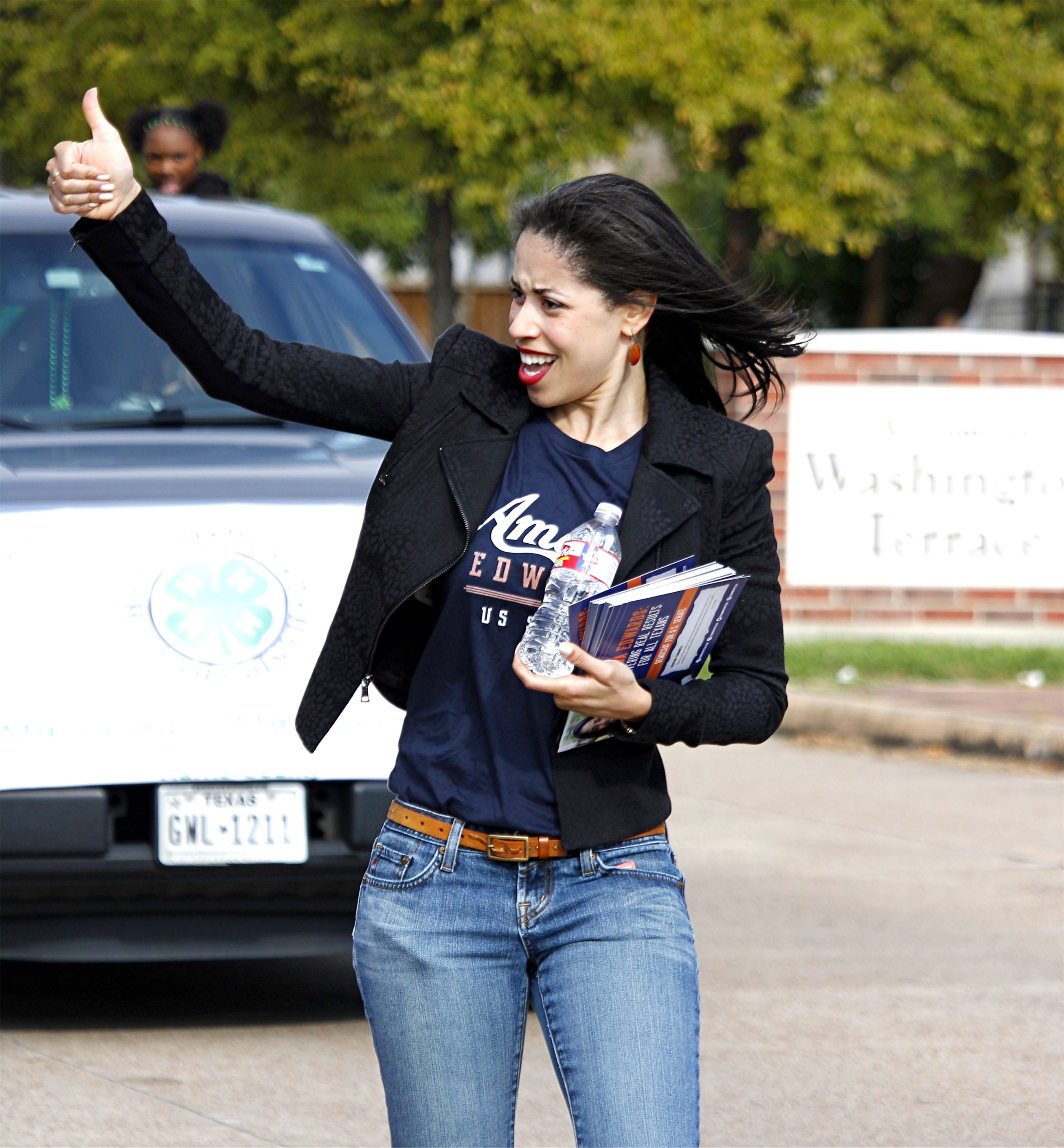
Edwards at a parade in 2019.

While on the Houston City Council, Edwards continued in disaster relief efforts after Houston was struck by Hurricane Harvey. She mobilized hundreds of volunteers to assist Harvey survivors by connecting them with help for flood damage, providing emergency supplies, case management and more. Edwards launched the Council Member Edwards’ Community Empowerment Signature Series to empower Houstonians to “be the solution” with respect to issues impacting their respective communities. This series provided programmatic opportunities ranging from senior conferences to film screenings and townhalls that served to educate, empower, and equip members of the community with the tools and the drive necessary for enacting positive change.

=== 2020 U.S. Senate race ===
In 2020, Edwards announced that she was running for John Cornyn's US Senate seat in the 2020 United States Senate election in Texas. After announcing, she was identified by local media as one of the seven candidates to watch in a crowded race with 12 declared candidates. Edwards placed fifth in the primary election with 10.14% of the vote.

=== 2023 Houston mayoral campaign and 2024 U.S. House campaigns ===
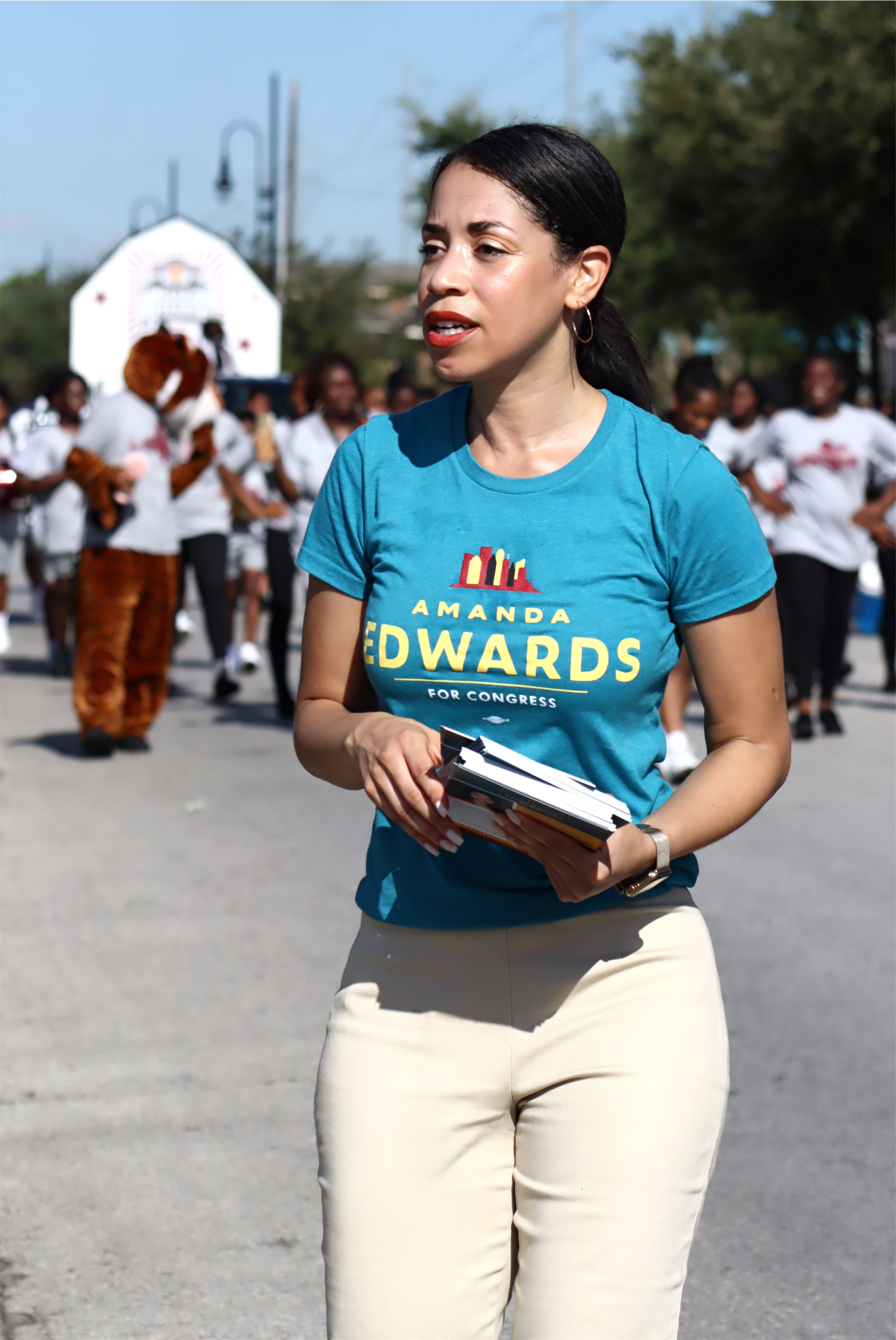
Edwards Campaigning at a parade in 2023

Edwards entered the 2023 Houston mayoral election but withdrew and endorsed U.S. Representative Sheila Jackson Lee following her campaign announcement. Edwards instead pivoted to run for the U.S. House; stating that she intended to remain a candidate even after Jackson Lee announced her intention to run for re-election. Edwards lost the primary election to Jackson Lee, placing second with 37.3% of the vote.

On July 19, 2024, Jackson Lee died due to complications from pancreatic cancer. Edwards announced her intention to run for the Democratic nomination for the seat, which was selected by the Harris County Democratic Party executive committee. Edwards lost in the second round of the nomination convention, four votes behind former Mayor of Houston Sylvester Turner— who died while in office on March 5, 2025.

=== 2025 U.S. House campaign ===
Following Turner's death, Edwards announced her third campaign for the U.S. House in the 2025 special election to replace him. Her campaign was endorsed by EMILY's List. She advanced to a runoff election along with fellow candidate Christian Menefee, current Harris County Attorney. She was defeated by Menefee on January 31, 2026.

== Personal life ==
Amanda Edwards is the founder of a nonprofit, Be The Solution: Community Empowerment Organization, which effectively advocates and empowers various groups ranging from senior citizens to women. Amanda serves on the advisory council of Accelerator for America and has served on the board of directors for National League of Cities, Houston Exponential and Project Row Houses.

Edwards is a member of the Houston Chapter of The Links, and a member of Alpha Kappa Alpha sorority. She is Catholic.

== Electoral history ==
=== 2026 ===
January 2026 Runoff Special Election for Texas 18th Congressional District
Party	Candidate	Votes	%
Democratic	Christian Dashaun Menefee	18,646	68.86%
Democratic	Amanda Edwards	8,434	31.14%

=== 2024 ===
2024 U.S. House of Representatives election in Texas' 18th congressional district, Democratic primary election
Party	Candidate	Votes	%
Democratic	Sheila Jackson Lee (incumbent)	23,629	60.0
Democratic	Amanda Edwards	14,668	37.3
Democratic	Robert Slater Jr. (withdrawn)	1,059	2.7
Total votes		39,356	100.0

2024 Texas' 18th congressional district Democratic nomination convention
Candidate	First ballot		Second ballot	
Candidate	Votes	%	Votes	%
Sylvester Turner	35	44.3%	41	52.6%
Amanda Edwards	34	43.0%	37	47.4%
Letitia Plummer	5	6.3%	Eliminated	
Christina Morales	3	3.8%	Eliminated	
Jarvis Johnson	2	2.5%	Eliminated	
Total	79	100.0%	78	100.0%

=== 2020 ===
2020 U.S. Senate election in Texas, Democratic primary election
Party	Candidate	Votes	%
Democratic	MJ Hegar	417,160	22.31%
Democratic	Royce West	274,074	14.66%
Democratic	Cristina Tzintzún Ramirez	246,659	13.19%
Democratic	Annie "Mamá" Garcia	191,900	10.27%
Democratic	Amanda Edwards	189,624	10.14%
Democratic	Chris Bell	159,751	8.55%
Democratic	Sema Hernandez	137,892	7.38%
Democratic	Michael Cooper	92,463	4.95%
Democratic	Victor Hugo Harris	59,710	3.19%
Democratic	Adrian Ocegueda	41,566	2.22%
Democratic	Jack Daniel Foster Jr.	31,718	1.70%
Democratic	D. R. Hunter	26,902	1.44%
Total votes		1,869,419	100.0%

=== 2015 ===
2015 Houston city council election, At-large Position 4
Candidate	Votes	%
Amanda Edwards	67,261	34.92
Roy Morales	32,563	16.91
Laurie Robinson	31,628	16.42
Evelyn Husband Thompson	25,880	13.44
Matt Murphy	17,722	9.20
Larry Blackmon	11,101	5.76
Jonathan Hansen	6,444	3.35
Total votes	192,599	100.00%

2015 Houston city council election, At-large Position 4 (runoff)
Candidate	Votes	%
Amanda Edwards	106,230	61.51
Roy Morales	66,467	38.49
Total votes	172,697	100.00%
