= Herman E. Lauhoff =

American politician

Herman Edward Lauhoff (August 8, 1933 – January 20, 2015) was an American businessman and politician.

From Houston, Texas, Lauhoff went to University of Houston and was in the real estate business. Lauhoff served in the Texas House of Representatives from 1974 until 1981 and was a Democrat. He died in Houston, Texas of Parkinson's disease.
