= Eleanor Tinsley =

American city council and school board member

Member of the Houston City Council
- In office 1979–1995

Personal details
- Born: October 31, 1926; Dallas, Texas
- Died: February 10, 2009
- Political party: Democratic

Eleanor Whilden Tinsley (October 31, 1926 – February 10, 2009) was an American politician from Texas. A member of the Democratic Party, she served as a member of the Houston City Council and as a member of the Houston Independent School Board. She was named to the Texas Women's Hall of Fame in 1988.

== Biography ==
The daughter of W. C. Whilden and Georgiabel Burleson, she was born in Dallas and grew up there. She was educated at the College of William and Mary and went on to earn a bachelor's degree at Baylor University. She married James Aubrey Tinsley in 1948 and moved to Houston in 1953; the couple had three children.

=== Political career ===
Tinsley was active in school integration. In 1969, she was elected to the Houston Independent School Board; she became board president in 1972. She was defeated when she ran for reelection in 1973.

She was elected to Houston city council in 1979. During her time on council, she worked on regulations to limit billboards, indoor smoking bans, bicycle helmet regulations, gay rights and establishing the 9-1-1 system. She served on council until 1995 when she was forced to retire due to limits on terms. She helped elect the city's first openly gay mayor Annise Parker in 2009. Tinsley continued to serve her community with organizations such as Planned Parenthood and the Baptist General Convention of Texas. She founded the SPARK Park Program which created 200 playgrounds and parks in Houston. She ran unsuccessfully for the position of county commissioner in 1990.

=== Other activities ===
Tinsley also served as president of the Texas Council of Child Welfare Boards. She helped establish payment by the state for foster care for children not covered by welfare and for children in the AFDC program.

She received the Texas Institute for Rehabilitation and Research's President Award for helping persons with disabilities and the American Lung Institute of Texas' Public Advocacy Award.

== Death and legacy ==
She died from cancer in Houston at the age of 82.

The Eleanor Tinsley Elementary School and Eleanor Tinsley Park were named in her honor.
