= Sue Lovell =

American politician (born 1950)

Member of the Houston City Council from the at-large No. 2 District
- In office January 2, 2006 – January 2, 2012
- Preceded by: Gordon Quan
- Succeeded by: Andrew Burks

Personal details
- Born: 1950 (age 75–76) Fresno, California
- Party: Democratic
- Occupation: Businesswoman

Sue Lovell is a local Houston politician who served on the Houston City Council, holding the at-large position 2 from 2006 to 2012. Lovell was a candidate for Mayor of Houston in 2019.

== Background and personal life ==
Lovell was born into a large French Catholic family in 1950 in Fresno, California. During her childhood she excelled in athletics, which led to her playing semi-pro softball during her teenage years. On January 31, 1970, when she was 19 years old, Lovell left California for Houston with "three suitcases and 35 dollars." Lovell's first job in Houston was at Riviana Food, where she first learned how to operate a printing press. In 1975, Lovell bought Long Point Printing & Rubber Stamp in Spring Branch, Texas, assuming the company's $35,000 debt. She worked at Academy Sports and Outdoors to supplement her income and help pay off the debt. She later sold the company to one of her first employees. Following the sale of her printing company, Lovell worked at Federal Express. From 1994 to 1999, Lovell worked in the office of the Texas Comptroller in the Local Government Assistance Division. In 1999, she worked for the Mills Corporation, where she created and implemented a job training and welfare-to-work program that later became the MATCH program (Mills Access to Training and Career Help). Lovell currently lives in Houston with her granddaughter.

As of 2007 she lived in the Montrose area, near Ervan Chew Park. She served as the president of the Friends of Ervan Chew Park.

== Professional life and political career ==
=== Houston GLBT Political Caucus ===
Lovell became involved with the Houston GLBT Political Caucus when she printed their newsletter pro bono. During Lovell's early involvement, the Caucus gained significant political influence, seeing its first endorsement and victory with the election of Eleanor Tinsley to Houston City Council in 1979. In 1981, Lovell was elected to the Caucus' board of directors. In 1982, she was elected vice president, and in fall 1984 she became the first female president of the Caucus when the then-president stepped down. She served as president through 1985, when she lost a runoff election against later-Mayor Annise Parker by one vote.

=== Houston City Council ===
In 2005, Lovell was elected to Houston City Council At-Large Position 2, and she was re-elected in 2007 and 2009. In January 2008, Lovell was elected Vice Mayor Pro-tem. She chairs the Transportation, Infrastructure, and Aviation Committee and the Development and Regulatory Affairs Committee. Lovell also serves on the: Budget and Fiscal Affairs; Ethics; Technology and Human Services; Public Safety and Homeland Security; M/WBE and Small Contractor Development; and Water Resources Management Committees. She has also chairs the Historic Preservation Subcommittee. As chair of the Transportation, Infrastructure and Aviation Committee, Lovell spearheaded a consent agreement between the City of Houston and Houston METRO voted on by Council for the construction of the new light-rail lines in Houston. Lovell represents the City of Houston on the Transportation Policy Council of the Houston-Galveston Area Council, the 13-county regional association of municipalities that promotes orderly development of the region and the safety and welfare of its residents. She also serves as the alternate to Mayor Annise Parker on the H-GAC board of directors.

=== Democratic National Committee ===
In 2000, Lovell was elected as a member of the Democratic National Committee.

== Community activism ==
=== AIDS Foundation Houston ===
In 1982, Lovell helped found AIDS Foundation Houston, on whose board she served for 12 years. The foundation provided a food pantry and residential facilities for people with HIV/AIDS, as well as creating an AIDS education brochures to be distributed in the United States.

=== Havens Center ===
At her church, St. Stephen's Episcopal, Lovell played an integral role in the creation of Havens Center, an after-school program for middle school youth and health-care program for low-income women. Lovell was a strong advocate for housing the Center in a nearby historical building, rather than constructing a new building.

== Candidacy for Mayor of Houston ==
On July 1, 2019, Sue Lovell declared her candidacy for the mayor of Houston in 2019. In a statement, Lovell said of her candidacy, "Now, more than ever, our citizens trust that public safety will be a priority, that the services they pay for will be delivered efficiently and on time, and that there will be an investment in the city's infrastructure and their quality of life. I will honor that trust and deliver on those commitments."

Lovell finished with 2,932 votes, 1.2% of the total electorate.
