= Jolanda Jones =

American attorney, politician and heptathlete (born 1965)

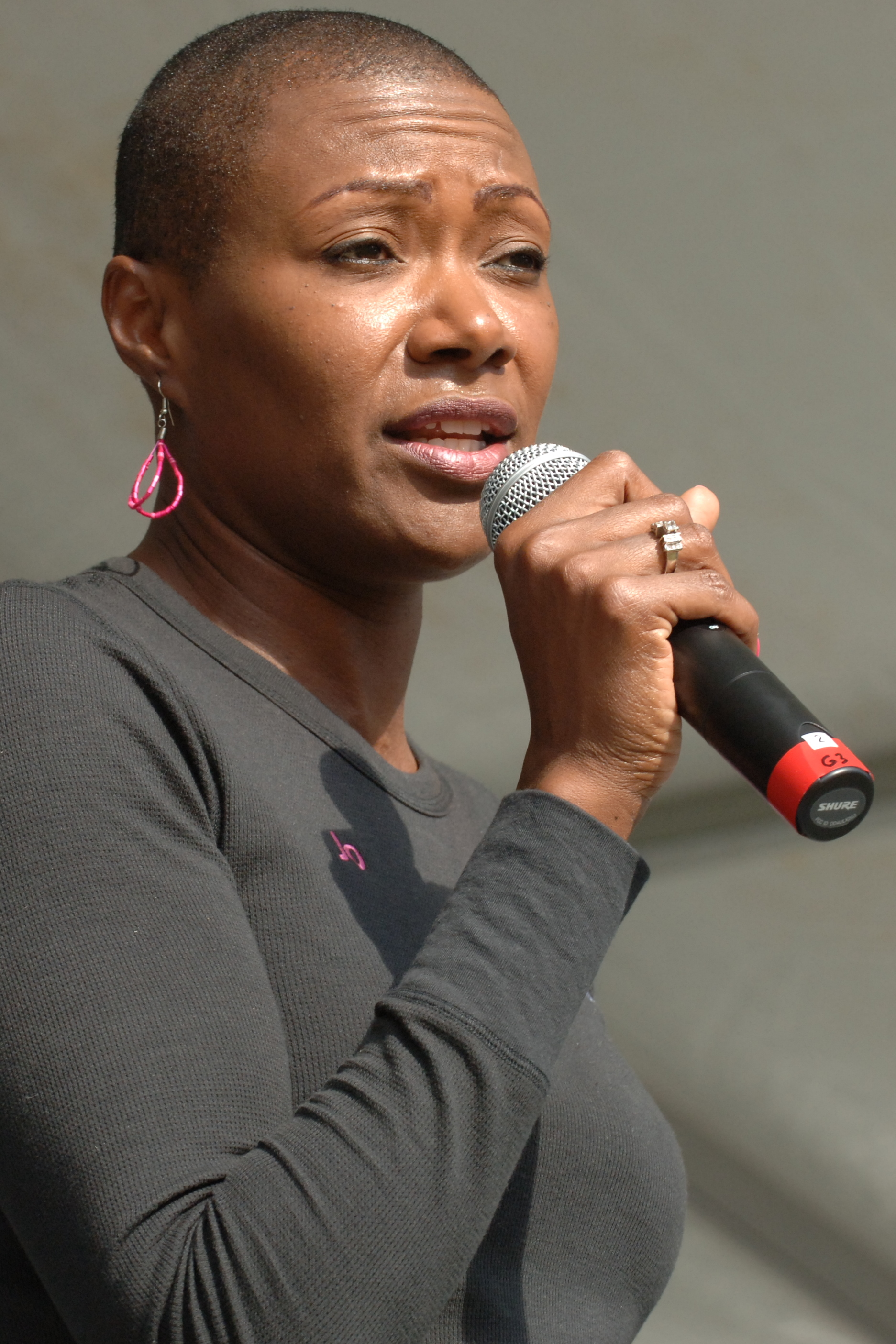
- Jones speaking in 2009

Member of the Texas House of Representatives from the 147th district
- Incumbent
- Assumed office May 18, 2022
- Preceded by: Garnet Coleman

Personal details
- Born: Jolanda Felicia Jones; November 6, 1965 (age 60) Harris County, Texas, U.S.
- Party: Democratic
- Education: University of Houston (BA, JD)
- Website: jolandajones.com

Jolanda Felicia Jones (born November 6, 1965) is an American attorney, politician, and television personality, as well as a former city councilor and heptathlete. A Democrat, she has been a member of the Texas House of Representatives representing the 147th district since May 18, 2022.

== Biography ==
Jones, the oldest of five children, was born to John Ferrell Jones and Gwendolyn Jean West and raised in Houston's Third Ward. During her childhood, she lost her father, brother, and immediate family members to either suicide or murder. Despite her tough circumstances, Jones' mother was insistent that she succeed academically. At Elsik High School, Jones was an All-American basketball player and track and field athlete. She earned an athletic scholarship to the University of Houston, and graduated with a political science degree. While at the University of Houston, she competed in the heptathlon and was a three time NCAA champion (1986, 1987, 1989). She competed at the 1987 Pan American Games where she won bronze. In 1995, she earned her J.D. from the University of Houston Law Center. She is a member of Alpha Kappa Alpha.

In 2004, she competed in Survivor: Palau, where she was the third person eliminated from the game, finishing in 18th place. From 2008 until 2011 she was a member of the Houston City Council, school board member and is a criminal defense lawyer in Texas. In 2016, she appeared on the reality series "Sisters in Law", which focused on several Black female attorneys practicing in Houston, Texas.

In May 2022, Jones became the first openly lesbian Black woman elected to the Texas state legislature after winning the special election to succeed retiring Representative Garnet Coleman in the Texas House District 147.

In August 2025, Jones was one of several Democratic representatives who broke quorum to delay the passage of controversial mid-decade redistricting maps. She attracted controversy when she compared the proposed maps to The Holocaust. Jones later apologized.

She was a candidate in Texas' 2025 18th congressional district special election, where she came third place with just over 19% of the vote.

== Personal life ==
Jones is openly lesbian, though she was once married to an abusive husband. Her experiences made her an advocate for LGBTQ causes and domestic violence victims.

In 2000, Jones was described as a lifelong Catholic.
