= Christian Menefee =

American attorney and politician (born 1988)

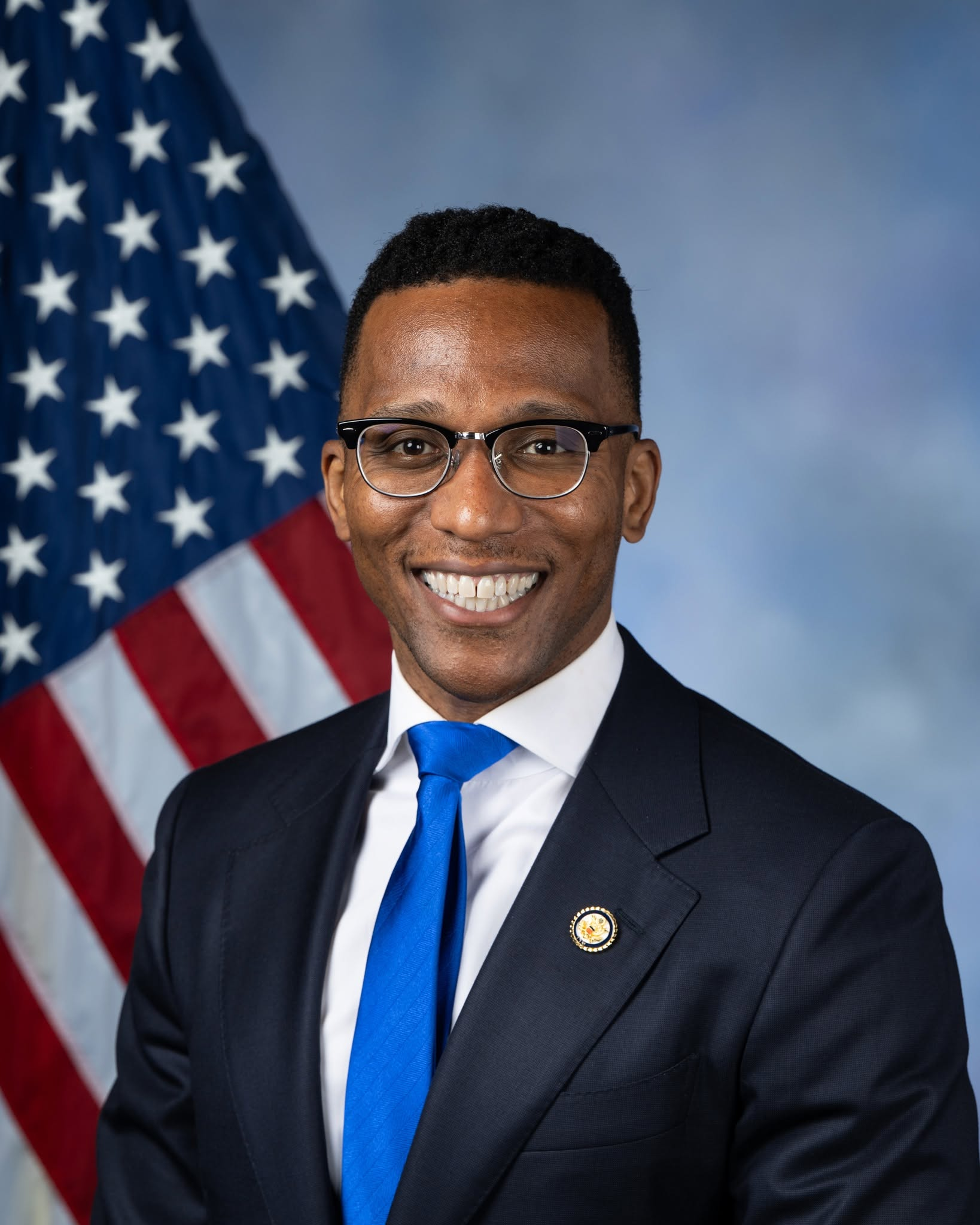
- Official portrait, 2026

Member of the U.S. House of Representatives from Texas's 18th district
- Incumbent
- Assumed office February 2, 2026
- Preceded by: Sylvester Turner

County Attorney of Harris County
- In office January 1, 2021 – January 14, 2026
- Preceded by: Vince Ryan
- Succeeded by: Jonathan Fombonne

Personal details
- Born: Christian Dashaun Menefee; April 18, 1988 (age 38) Houston, Texas, U.S.
- Party: Democratic
- Spouse: Kaitlyn Pennington-Hill (m. 2019)
- Children: 2
- Education: University of Texas, San Antonio (BA); Washington University (JD)
- Website: House website Campaign website

Christian Dashaun Menefee (/ˈmɛnəfi/; born April 18, 1988) is an American politician and attorney who has been serving as the U.S. representative for Texas's 18th congressional district since February 2026. A member of the Democratic Party, Menefee previously served as County Attorney for Harris County, Texas, from 2021 to 2026. He was the youngest person and the first African-American to hold the office.

== Early career ==
Menefee was born in Houston, Texas and was the first from his family to attend college. Menefee is a graduate of Alief Hastings High School, University of Texas at San Antonio, and Washington University School of Law. Prior to taking office, Menefee practiced law at Norton Rose Fulbright and Kirkland & Ellis LLP. He said that the 2016 United States presidential election made him want to enter politics, and that the office of County Attorney is "the perfect intersection of law and policy making."

== Harris County Attorney ==
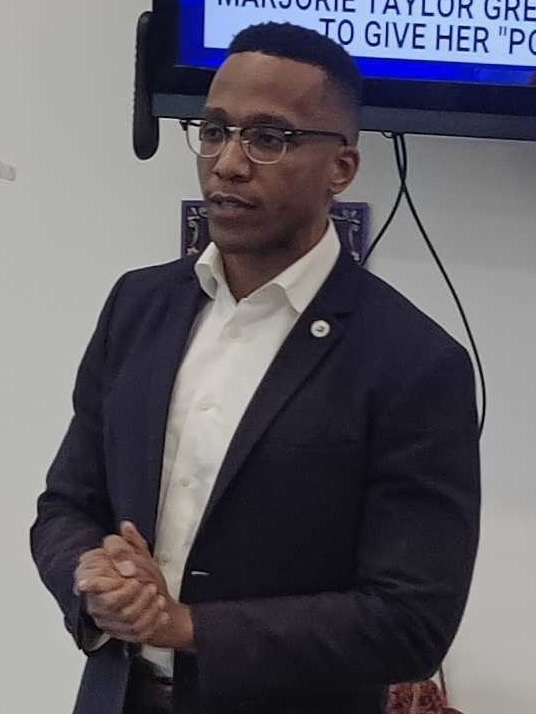
Menefee in 2022

Menefee defeated three-term incumbent Harris County Attorney Vince Ryan and another challenger in the March 2020 Texas Democratic Primary Election, and won the November 2020 General Election. He took office in January 2021. He is the youngest and first African American to serve as Harris County Attorney.

Menefee has filed several lawsuits and taken other legal action against Texas Governor Greg Abbott and Texas Attorney General Ken Paxton. He sued Texas officials over the voting restrictions law passed by the legislature in 2021, and challenged state officials' demands to audit the 2020 and 2022 elections in Harris County. After state officials auditing the 2020 election announced they would send a contingent of inspectors to observe Harris County's 2022 general election and perform random checks of election records, Menefee joined Houston Mayor Sylvester Turner and Harris County Judge Lina Hidalgo in calling on the United States Department of Justice to send federal monitors to the county. In 2021, after Harris County imposed a mask mandate for government buildings in the county, Menefee filed a lawsuit on behalf of Harris County against Texas Governor Greg Abbott over his ban on mask and vaccine mandates. This led to appearances on national news networks such as MSNBC to explain his opposition to Abbott's policies. The trial and appellate courts sided with Menefee in allowing Harris County's mask mandate to stand.

In March 2022, when Greg Abbott issued a directive to Texas's child protective services agency (DFPS) to open investigations into child abuse by parents who provide gender-affirming care to their transgender children, Menefee publicly refused to prosecute civil cases against those parents, publishing an open letter in The Daily Beast.

Prior to the vote certification deadline for the November 2022 General Election, Menefee represented Harris County in a suit brought by Texas Attorney General Ken Paxton to void more than 2,000 votes cast pursuant to a court order extending polling hours by one hour in Harris County on Election Day. The Texas Supreme Court sided with Harris County, ruling that it could count the ballots cast during the additional hour of voting.

Menefee has used the Harris County Attorney's Office to file a number of high-profile environmental lawsuits, including against Union Pacific in connection with creosote-related contamination in Houston's Fifth Ward. He has filed complaints with the EPA to investigate how the TCEQ grants permits to concrete batch plants.

In January 2023, Menefee was appointed by United States Environmental Protection Agency (EPA) Administrator Michael S. Regan to serve on the EPA's Local Government Advisory Committee.

On March 18, 2025, he announced his resignation to run in the special election for the U.S. House of Representatives after the death of Representative Sylvester Turner. He remained in office as county attorney until a successor appointed by the Harris County Commissioners Court could take office. On January 8, 2026, the Harris County Commissioners Court unanimously voted to appoint Jonathan Fombonne as the next Harris County Attorney. Fombonne was formally sworn in on January 14, 2026.

== U.S. House of Representatives ==
=== Election ===
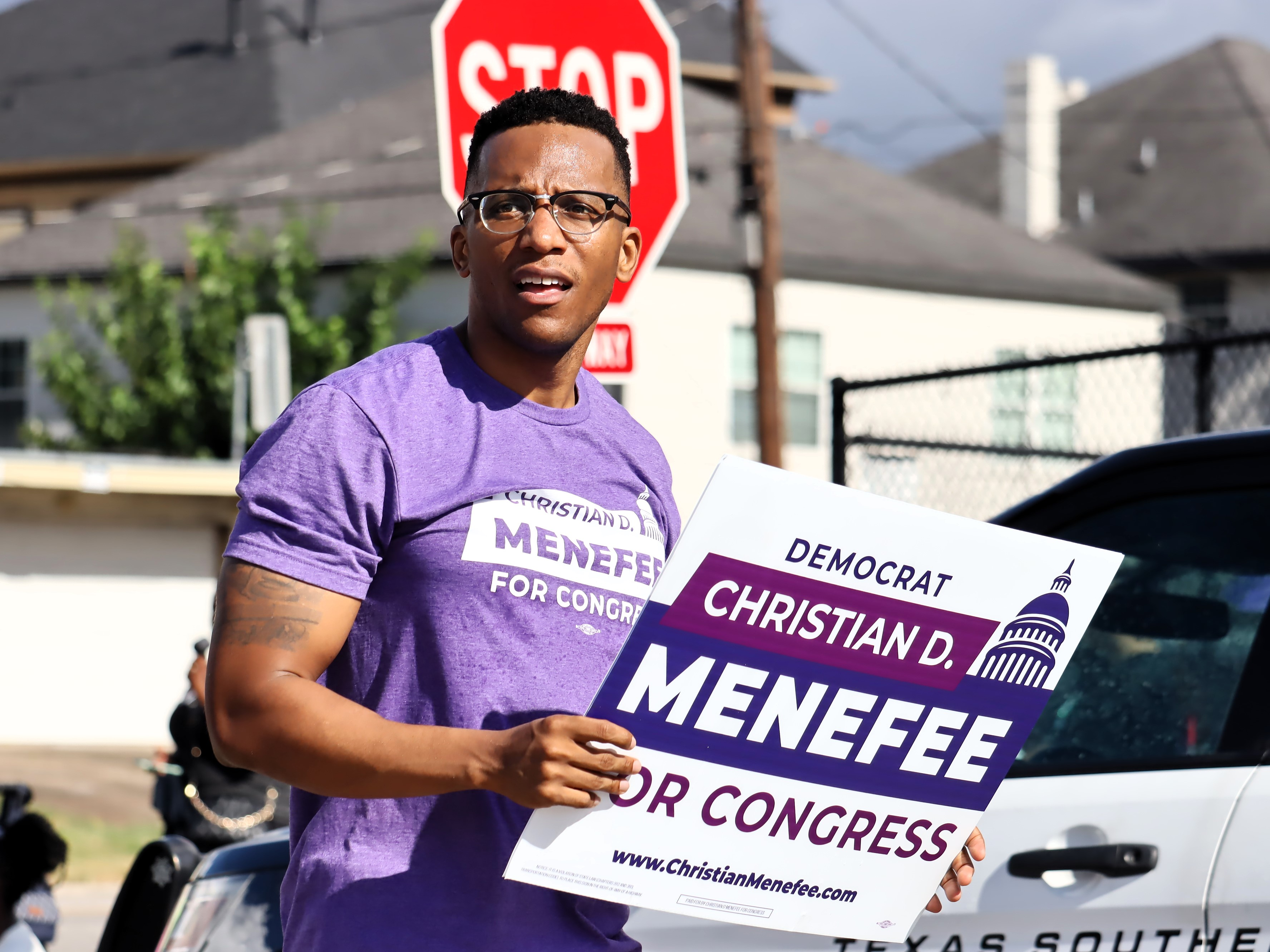
Menefee campaigning, October 2025

==== 2025–26 special election ====
On March 18, 2025, Menefee announced his intention to run in the special election in Texas's 18th congressional district, which was vacant following the death of Sylvester Turner. He remained in office as Harris County attorney until his successor, Jonathan Fombonne, took office on January 14. Menefee defeated fellow Democrat Amanda Edwards in a runoff on January 31, 2026, by approximately 37 percentage points. Menefee was the first member of Congress elected after signing the Political Integrity Pledge banning congressional stock trading and rejecting corporate PAC money.

==== Tenure ====
In April 2026, Menefee introduced his first bill in Congress, the Special Election Timeliness Act, which would require states to hold special elections for vacant House seats within 180 days. The proposal followed the 334-day vacancy in Texas's 18th congressional district between the death of Representative Sylvester Turner and Menefee's swearing-in. The legislation was intended to prevent prolonged vacancies that leave constituents without representation. The bill was referred to the House Committee on House Administration.

=== 2026 election ===
Because of 2025 redistricting, Menefee had to run in a three-way Democratic primary for the 2026 general election just one month after being sworn in. His opponents were Al Green, an eleven-term U.S. Representative who had been drawn out of his own district and into Menefee's, and Amanda Edwards, a former member of the Houston City Council. No candidate received 50% of the vote, so a runoff between Green and Menefee was held on May 26, 2026. Menefee defeated Green in the runoff by 39 percentage points.

==== Committee assignments ====
- Committee on Science, Space, and Technology

== Electoral history ==
=== 2020 ===
March 2020 Harris County Attorney Primary Election
Party	Candidate	Votes	%
Democratic	Christian Dashaun Menefee	125,971	50.45%
Democratic	Vince Ryan (incumbent)	62,630	25.08%
Democratic	Ben Rose	61,103	24.47%
Total votes		249,704	100.0%

November 2020 Harris County Attorney General Election
Party	Candidate	Votes	%
Democratic	Christian Dashaun Menefee	848,451	54.66%
Republican	John Nation	703,771	45.34%
Total votes		1,552,222	100.0%

=== 2024 ===
March 2024 Harris County Attorney Primary Election
Party	Candidate	Votes	%
Democratic	Christian D. Menefee	108,207	70.04%
Democratic	Umeka "UA" Lewis	46,282	29.96%
Total votes		154,489	100.0%

November 2024 Harris County Attorney General Election
Party	Candidate	Votes	%
Democratic	Christian D. Menefee	739,048	50.58%
Republican	Jacqueline Lucci Smith	722,031	49.42%
Total votes		1,461,079	100.00%

=== 2025 ===
Special election jungle primary results
Party	Candidate	Votes	%
Democratic	Christian Menefee	22,022	28.90
Democratic	Amanda Edwards	19,467	25.55
Democratic	Jolanda Jones	14,549	19.10
Republican	Carmen María Montiel	5,110	6.71
Democratic	Isaiah Martin	4,337	5.69
Republican	Ollie Knox	3,131	4.11
Democratic	Stephen Huey	1,415	1.86
Republican	Ronald Whitfield	1,175	1.54
Republican	Carter Page	943	1.24
Republican	Theodis Daniel	937	1.23
Democratic	Valencia Williams	915	1.20
Independent	George Foreman IV	828	1.09
Democratic	Feldon Bonner II	555	0.73
Independent	Vince Duncan	407	0.53
Independent	Reyna Anderson	263	0.35
Green	Tammie Rochester	135	0.18
Total votes		76,189	100.00

=== 2026 ===
January 2026 Special Election Runoff for Texas 18th Congressional District
Party	Candidate	Votes	%
Democratic	Christian Dashaun Menefee	18,646	68.86
Democratic	Amanda Edwards	8,434	31.14
Total votes		27,080	100.00

March 2026 Democratic primary results
Party	Candidate	Votes	%
Democratic	Christian Menefee (incumbent)	43,750	46.0
Democratic	Al Green (incumbent)	42,009	44.2
Democratic	Amanda Edwards (withdrawn)	7,339	7.7
Democratic	Gretchen Brown	1,941	2.0
Total votes		95,039	100.0

May 2026 Democratic primary runoff results
Party	Candidate	Votes	%
Democratic	Christian Menefee (incumbent)	33,957	69.4
Democratic	Al Green (incumbent)	15,001	30.6
Total votes		48,958	100.0

2026 Texas' 18th congressional district election
Party	Candidate	Votes	%
Democratic	Christian Menefee (incumbent)	193,149	86.04
Republican	Ronald Whitfield	31,334	13.96
Total votes		224,483	100.0

U.S. House of Representatives
Preceded by Sylvester Turner	Member of the U.S. House of Representatives from Texas's 18th congressional district 2026–present	Incumbent
U.S. order of precedence (ceremonial)
Preceded by Matt Van Epps	United States representatives by seniority 428th	Succeeded by Clay Fuller
