= Sylvester Turner =

American attorney and politician (1954–2025)

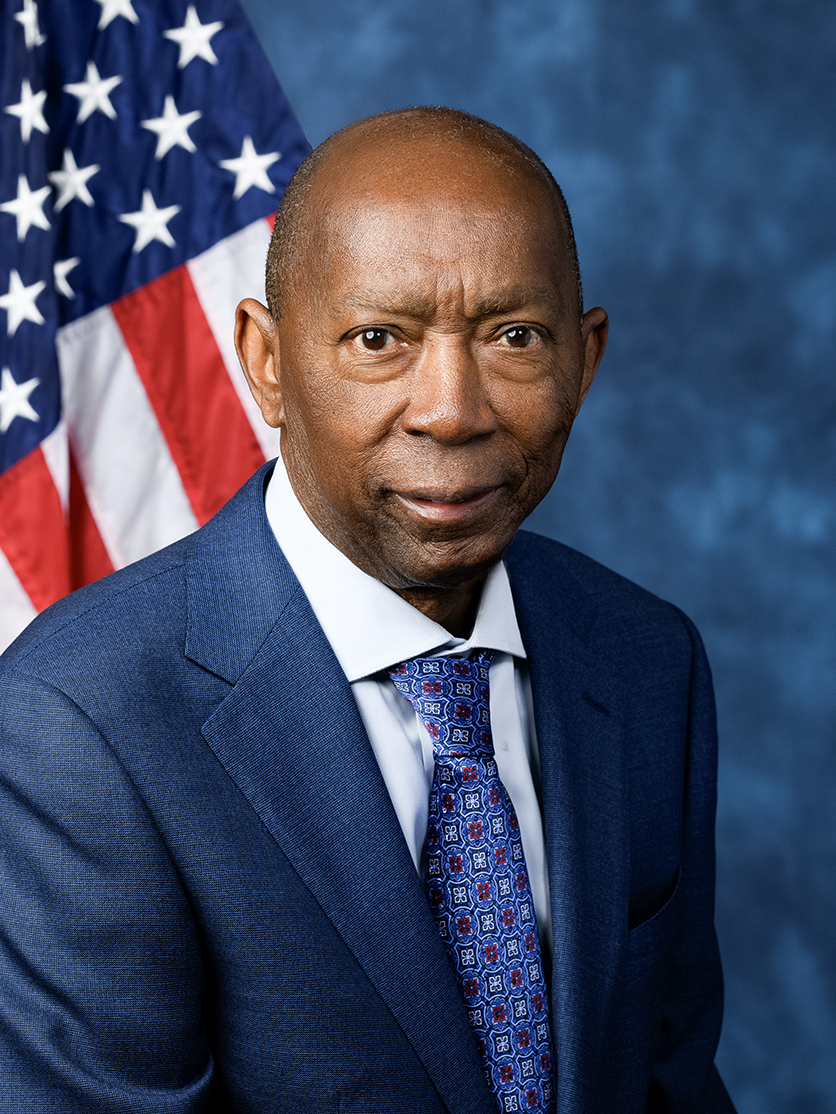
- Official portrait, 2025

Member of the U.S. House of Representatives from Texas's 18th district
- In office January 3, 2025 – March 5, 2025
- Preceded by: Erica Lee Carter
- Succeeded by: Christian Menefee

62nd Mayor of Houston
- In office January 2, 2016 – January 2, 2024
- Preceded by: Annise Parker
- Succeeded by: John Whitmire

Member of the Texas House of Representatives from the 139th district
- In office January 10, 1989 – January 2, 2016
- Preceded by: Clint Hackney
- Succeeded by: Jarvis Johnson

Personal details
- Born: September 27, 1954 Houston, Texas, U.S.
- Died: March 5, 2025 (aged 70) Washington, D.C., U.S.
- Party: Democratic
- Spouse: Cheryl Gillum (m. 1983; div. 1991)
- Children: 1
- Education: University of Houston (BA); Harvard University (JD)
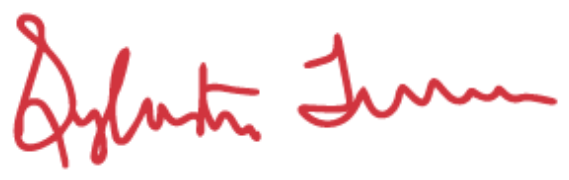
- Signature
- Turner's voice Turner on Carrin Patman. Recorded February 2022

Sylvester Turner (September 27, 1954 – March 5, 2025) was an American politician and attorney who served as the U.S. representative for Texas's 18th congressional district from January 2025 until his death in March 2025. A member of the Democratic Party, Turner served as the 62nd mayor of Houston from 2016 to 2024 and as a member of the Texas House of Representatives from 1989 to 2016.

Born and raised in Houston, Turner graduated from the University of Houston with a bachelor's degree in political science and from Harvard Law School with a Juris Doctor. He was first elected to the Texas House of Representatives in 1988 and continued to serve in the Texas House until 2016.

Turner ran unsuccessfully for mayor of Houston in 1991 and again in 2003. Turner won the 2015 Houston mayoral election, defeating Bill King by a margin of under two percent in the closest mayoral election in Houston history. On December 14, 2019, Turner won his second term as mayor over Tony Buzbee.

In 2024, after the death of Sheila Jackson Lee, Turner announced his candidacy to fill her congressional seat and was nominated at the subsequent convention. He was then elected in November 2024 and took office in January 2025. He served on the Homeland Security Committee and the Science, Space, & Technology Committee. Turner died in the early morning of March 5, 2025, after attending Donald Trump's speech to a joint session of Congress on the previous night.

== Early life and education ==
Sylvester Turner was born on September 27, 1954, in Houston, Texas, the sixth of nine children of Eddie Turner, a commercial painter, and Ruby Mae Turner. He was raised in the northwest Houston community of Acres Homes. Turner's father died when Turner was 13. After that time, Turner's mother began working as a maid at the Rice Hotel in downtown Houston. Turner later credited her perseverance and optimism as significant influences on his personal and professional development.

Turner attended Klein High School, which had been an all-white school until Black students, including Turner, were bussed there as part of desegregation efforts. At Klein, Turner excelled academically, serving as student body president, winning recognition as a debate champion, and graduating as valedictorian. He went on to study at the University of Houston, where he served as Speaker of the Student Senate and graduated magna cum laude in 1976 with a Bachelor of Arts in political science. Turner had been interested in a legal career from a young age, inspired in part by the TV show Perry Mason, and he went on to attend Harvard Law School, where he was a finalist in the Ames Moot Court Competition and graduated with a Juris Doctor in 1980. Turner was a member of the Alpha Phi Alpha fraternity, and was initiated into the Alpha Eta Lambda chapter in Houston.

== Legal career ==
Upon completing law school, Turner joined the law firm of Fulbright & Jaworski. In 1983, Turner and Barry M. Barnes partnered to found the law firm of Barnes & Turner, where Turner specialized in corporate and commercial law. Turner served as an immigration lawyer for many years in Houston.

He served as an adjunct professor at the Thurgood Marshall School of Law, and as a seminar lecturer at the South Texas College of Law and the University of Houston Law School's Continuing Legal Education Programs.

== Political career ==
In 1984, Turner ran for Harris County Commissioner, Precinct 1 in the Democratic primary, but lost to El Franco Lee.

=== Texas State House ===
In 1988, Turner was elected to the Texas House of Representatives in House District 139 in Harris County and remained in office through 2014. During this time, Turner ran unsuccessfully for mayor of Houston in 1991 and 2003.

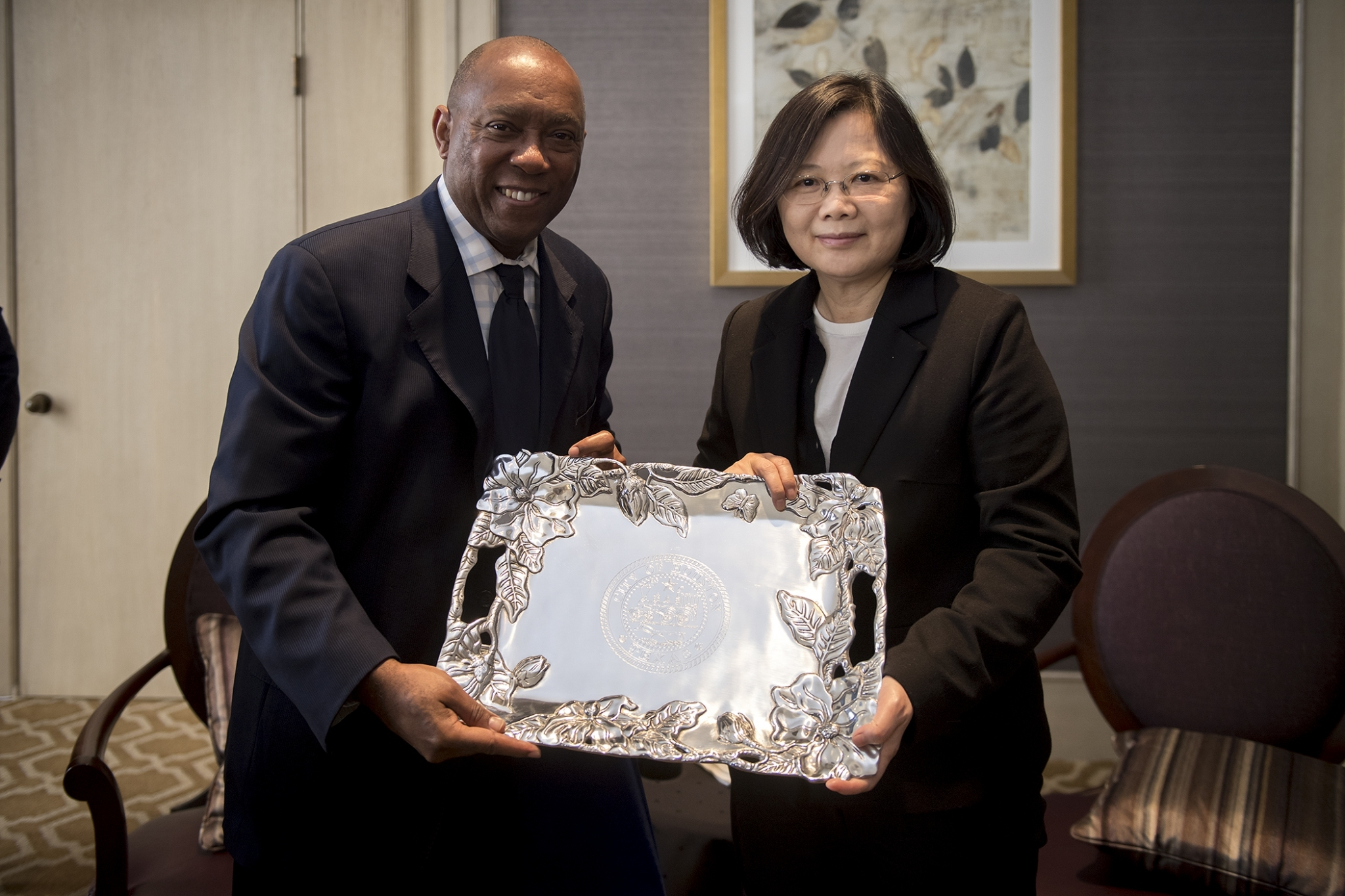
Turner with Taiwanese President Tsai Ing-wen in January 2017.

Turner served more than 25 years in the Texas House of Representatives, and throughout his service, he served as a member of the Legislative Budget Board, Vice-Chairman of the House Appropriations Committee, Chairman of the Subcommittee of Articles 1, 4 & 5 (General Government, Judiciary, Public Safety & Criminal Justice) and the House State Affairs Committee. He also chaired the Texas Legislative Black Caucus and the Greater Houston Area Legislative Delegation. Turner supported policies to attract doctors to underserved areas, proposed a measure increasing state funding for mental health services in Harris County from $32 million to $200 million, and worked to increase funds for legal aid for poor Texans.

=== Unsuccessful 1991 Houston mayoral election ===
During Turner's 1991 campaign for Houston mayor, Wayne Dolcefino of KTRK-TV ran an investigative report questioning Turner's involvement in an elaborate life insurance fraud scam. The resulting scandal ultimately cost Turner the election. Turner sued Wayne Dolcefino, and KTRK and was initially awarded a $5.5 million libel settlement in a jury trial; the trial court reduced the award to $3.25 million, in keeping with the legal limit on punitive damages. Dolcefino and KTRK appealed the verdict to the Court of Appeals, Houston, which reversed the original verdict. Turner brought the case to the Texas Supreme Court, which upheld the Court of Appeals decision. Both courts found that Turner had not provided sufficient evidence to prove malice, based on heightened legal protections that the First Amendment affords to the press. However, both courts found that the KTRK broadcasts were both false and defamatory.

== Mayor of Houston ==
In 2015, Turner was elected Mayor of Houston, narrowly winning a runoff against Bill King after taking 31% of the vote on the first ballot. He was re-elected in 2019, defeating challenger Tony Buzbee by a comfortable margin. He served in the office for a total of eight years.

In October 2017, Turner helped victims of Hurricane Maria in Puerto Rico. In cooperation with Bill Baldwin, the city council, the Houston Astros, Houston Relief Hub, United Airlines and the Texas United for Puerto Rico group, Turner and the city of Houston were able to send over 55 55 pallets of aid to help their counterparts affected by the storm.

In the aftermath of Hurricane Harvey, Turner received criticism for his decision not to suggest any form of evacuation. He responded to the criticism by pointing out the logistics of evacuating "6.5 million" people and the deaths and traffic that occurred during the 2005 Hurricane Rita evacuation. Critics replied stating that 6.5 million people did not have to be evacuated but instead tens of thousands could have been evacuated who were in flood zones or individuals who were most at risk during emergencies could have been evacuated.

When Turner's eight year tenure as mayor ended on January 1, 2024, the city was in a dire financial state. The city was spending $100 to $200 million more than what it was bringing in each year.

In 2023, Turner endorsed Sheila Jackson Lee to be his successor in the 2023 Houston mayoral election; she lost the runoff election by nearly 30 percentage points.

=== U.S. House of Representatives ===
Following the death of Sheila Jackson Lee, which vacated Texas's 18th congressional district, Turner announced his candidacy in the Democratic primary to fill her seat and was nominated at the convention. He won the election and took office in January 2025. During his tenure, Turner served on the Homeland Security Committee and the Science, Space, & Technology Committee.

Turner served in Congress until his death on March 5, 2025. Harris County Attorney Christian Menefee was elected to replace Turner in a runoff special election on January 31, 2026.

== Political positions ==
=== Ride sharing mobile apps ===
In 2016, Turner voiced his support for stricter laws regulating Uber and other ridesharing services.

=== LGBT rights ===
Turner, while running against Bill King in the 2015 Houston mayoral runoff election, stated he was "100 percent" committed to reenacting Houston Equal Rights Ordinance (HERO) and attacked Bill King for saying he would not revisit the issue of HERO or his support from the Campaign for Houston.

=== Consumer protections ===
In 1999, Turner voted to restructure the electric utility industry in Texas to allow customers competition and consumer choice. During his time in the legislature, he also worked to continue to protect Texans, voting for bills preventing gas companies from cutting off service during freezing temperatures, limiting the amount utility companies could raise rates in order to fund certain projects, such as building electric poles and wires, without first getting approval from state regulators, and authoring legislation that required the Public Utility Commission to conduct cost-benefit analyses of any proposals from utility companies that would add more than $100 million to annual consumer electricity costs. During the 84th session, Turner authored legislation that would prohibit electricity companies from charging customers "minimum usage fees" when they used too little electricity. Turner also voted to allow the Public Utility Commission to issue emergency cease-and-desist orders, without first going to a court, to companies whose actions threaten the state's electricity supply. During the 83rd session, he joined a campaign to encourage low-income Texans to enroll in "LITE-UP Texas", a program "authorized by the Texas Legislature through which participants could reduce the monthly cost of electric service by 82%." In the 84th session, he authored a bill to extend this discount program for another two years, until the end of 2017. He also co-authored a bill to help ensure persons living in multi-family residences are alerted when their electricity bill has not been paid.

=== Public education ===
In 2004, he voted against a measure that would have scaled "back benefits for future public school employees and discourag[ed] early retirement." He was also critical of investment managers for the Teachers Retirement Fund for taking over $8.2 million in bonuses while the state was slashing funding for education and the system's investments continued to struggle. In 2011, Turner voted against a measure that would have implemented a 6 percent cut to education funding for all schools in Texas, a move that equated to a $4 billion education funding cut. As a member of the legislature, Turner voted against a measure that would allow school districts to lower their salaries, implement furlough days, and increase student-teacher classroom ratios. He also opposed a corporate tax break that many legislators, in the Texas House of Representatives, believed would hurt public school funding.

=== Immigration ===
During his tenure, Turner emphasized Houston's identity as a diverse and immigrant-friendly city. In 2016, he signed Houston onto the Welcoming America network, formally designating it a "Welcoming City" and strengthening the city's Office of New Americans and Immigrant Communities. He partnered with the Mexican Consulate in Houston and local nonprofits to host large-scale citizenship forums, legal clinics, and health fairs, and he reassured immigrant families during Hurricane Harvey (2017) and the COVID-19 pandemic that they could access emergency services without fear of immigration enforcement.

In 2021, the City of Houston, through its Office of New Americans and Immigrant Communities, worked with local nonprofits and faith-based groups—including the Church of Jesus Christ of Latter-day Saints, Catholic Charities, YMCA International Services, and Houston Responds—to establish the city's first Family Transfer Center for newly arrived migrants. The facility provided short-term shelter, food, medical screenings, hygiene supplies, and travel assistance, and was capable of serving up to 500 asylum-seeking families per day. The opening of the Family Transfer Center came amid what local officials and media described as the largest influx of migrants in Houston's history.

Turner also opposed Texas Senate Bill 4 (2017), which sought to compel local police to enforce federal immigration law, affirming that Houston police would not serve as immigration agents. Although Texas law banned so-called sanctuary cities, Turner stated that Houston would not assist ICE agents with immigration raids.

In 2016, the Obama White House recognized Houston with a presidential letter of recognition for its participation in the Building Welcoming Communities Campaign, highlighting the city's efforts to promote immigrant inclusion and integration. That same year, Turner received the Ohtli Award, the Mexican government's highest honor, in recognition of his support for Houston's Mexican community.

=== Health care ===
A supporter of the federal Affordable Care Act (ACA), Turner voted against joining the Interstate Health Care Compact, an alternative to traditional ACA participation, and introduced legislation that would expand Medicaid in Texas pursuant to the ACA. Turner warned fellow legislators about the potential backlash from constituents if the state chose not to expand Medicaid, which promised a significant return on the state's investment. One of his major accomplishments in the House was legislation that expanded access to the children's health insurance program, which was passed in 2007. Turner also passed legislation in 2015 to free up funding for medical trauma care centers. During the 84th Legislature, Turner introduced legislation that would provide care under Medicaid for people with severe and persistent mental illness and who are transitioning from an institution to the community, and who are at risk of institutionalization or re-institutionalization.

Turner was a regular attendee of various public health programs, including contributions to COVID-19 safety and community-based health care.

==== Abortion ====
Turner was long an advocate for abortion rights. He voted against a measure requiring doctors to perform a sonogram on women seeking an abortion at least 24 hours before the procedures. He also fought to protect funding for family planning programs and Planned Parenthood. Turner also voted against a Senate version of a measure that banned abortions after 20 weeks and tightened standards on abortion clinics, and also authored an amendment to the bill that would have required the state to pay the costs abortion clinics would incur on the measure to retrofit facilities so they could be certified as surgical centers. In 2013, the El Paso Times described Turner as a "lion of pro-abortion rights."

=== Criminal justice ===
On gun control, Turner opposed measures to limit lawsuits against gun or ammunition manufacturers, allowing concealed handguns on higher education campuses, and rescinding the authority of local governments to ban concealed weapons on public property. He also opposed measures that would reduce the number of training hours required to receive a concealed handgun license. He supported a bill that prohibited the use of state funds for the enforcement of federal firearms regulations. Turner also advocated abandoning the "pick-a-pal system", where judges appoint commissioners who then can pick whoever they want to serve on grand juries.

=== Homelessness ===
As mayor of Houston, Turner made it a goal of his administration to end chronic homelessness in the city. Turner asked the police to start enforcing an ordinance that limits sharing food with homeless people to specific locations in the city of Houston. Consequently, the Food Not Bombs volunteer group in Houston received 44 tickets issued by the Houston police department for providing food to homeless people in Houston, with each ticket carrying a maximum potential fine of $2,000.

=== Political endorsements ===
In February 2020, Turner endorsed Michael Bloomberg in the 2020 Democratic Party presidential primaries. In March, Bloomberg suspended his campaign and endorsed then-former vice president Joe Biden. Days after Bloomberg's announcement, Turner endorsed Biden.

== Personal life ==
Turner was married to Cheryl (née Gillum) Turner, a former Harris County assistant district attorney, from 1983 to late 1991. They had one daughter, Ashley Page Turner, who married Jimmie Captain in March 2022.

As mayor, Turner hosted the opening ceremonies of Anime Matsuri from 2018 to 2023, barring 2020, having made appearances in anime cosplay as a member of the Akatsuki from Naruto in 2018, Goku from Dragon Ball in 2019, Kyōjurō Rengoku from Demon Slayer in 2021, Ichigo Kurosaki from Bleach in 2022, and Luffy from One Piece in 2023.

=== Illness and death ===
In November 2022, Turner disclosed that during the summer he had been diagnosed with osteosarcoma, a rare type of bone cancer for which he had surgery and received six weeks of radiation treatment.

On the afternoon of March 4, 2025, Turner fell ill while working in the Cannon House Office Building complex. After receiving medical attention, he was able to attend president Donald Trump's address to Congress that evening. He later died in the early morning of March 5 at the age of 70. Having served a total of 61 days in the House, Turner was the first member of the 119th Congress to die in office and the second incumbent representative for Texas's 18th district (after Sheila Jackson Lee) to die in a one-year period.

Houston's mayor, John Whitmire, ordered flags in the city of Houston to fly at half-staff in Turner's memory. Texas governor Greg Abbott ordered flags across the state of Texas to fly at half-staff for Turner until sunrise on March 8, 2025.

Turner lay in state at the Houston City Hall rotunda on March 11. From March 13–14, Turner lay in honor at the Texas State Capitol's House chamber. His funeral took place at The Church Without Walls in Houston on March 15.

== Electoral history ==
Sylvester Turner electoral history

=== Texas House of Representatives ===
1992 Texas House of Representatives 139th district election
Primary election
Party	Candidate	Votes	%
Democratic	Sylvester Turner (incumbent)	4,112	100.00%
Total votes		4,112	100.00%
General election
Democratic	Sylvester Turner (incumbent)	19,542	100.00%
Total votes		19,542	100.00%

1994 Texas House of Representatives 139th district election
Primary election
Party	Candidate	Votes	%
Democratic	Sylvester Turner (incumbent)	4,278	100.00%
Total votes		4,278	100.00%
General election
Democratic	Sylvester Turner (incumbent)	11,944	100.00%
Total votes		11,944	100.00%

1996 Texas House of Representatives 139th district election
Primary election
Party	Candidate	Votes	%
Democratic	Sylvester Turner (incumbent)	2,522	100.00%
Total votes		2,522	100.00%
General election
Democratic	Sylvester Turner (incumbent)	17,194	100.00%
Total votes		17,194	100.00%

1998 Texas House of Representatives 139th district election
Primary election
Party	Candidate	Votes	%
Democratic	Sylvester Turner (incumbent)	870	100.00%
Total votes		870	100.00%
General election
Democratic	Sylvester Turner (incumbent)	12,068	100.00%
Total votes		12,068	100.00%

2000 Texas House of Representatives 139th district election
Primary election
Party	Candidate	Votes	%
Democratic	Sylvester Turner (incumbent)	1,824	100.00%
Total votes		1,824	100.00%
General election
Democratic	Sylvester Turner (incumbent)	22,642	100.00%
Total votes		22,642	100.00%

2002 Texas House of Representatives 139th district election
Primary election
Party	Candidate	Votes	%
Democratic	Sylvester Turner (incumbent)	4,504	100.00%
Total votes		4,504	100.00%
General election
Democratic	Sylvester Turner (incumbent)	18,559	100.00%
Total votes		18,559	100.00%

2004 Texas House of Representatives 139th district election
Primary election
Party	Candidate	Votes	%
Democratic	Sylvester Turner (incumbent)	3,006	100.00%
Total votes		3,006	100.00%
General election
Democratic	Sylvester Turner (incumbent)	30,151	100.00%
Total votes		30,151	100.00%

2006 Texas House of Representatives 139th district election
Primary election
Party	Candidate	Votes	%
Democratic	Sylvester Turner (incumbent)	1,221	100.00%
Total votes		1,221	100.00%
General election
Democratic	Sylvester Turner (incumbent)	13,969	100.00%
Total votes		13,969	100.00%

2008 Texas House of Representatives 139th district election
Primary election
Party	Candidate	Votes	%
Democratic	Sylvester Turner (incumbent)	17,785	100.00%
Total votes		17,785	100.00%
General election
Democratic	Sylvester Turner (incumbent)	35,220	100.00%
Total votes		35,220	100.00%

2010 Texas House of Representatives 139th district election
Primary election
Party	Candidate	Votes	%
Democratic	Sylvester Turner (incumbent)	6,213	100.00%
Total votes		6,213	100.00%
General election
Democratic	Sylvester Turner (incumbent)	20,842	100.00%
Total votes		20,842	100.00%

2012 Texas House of Representatives 139th district election
Primary election
Party	Candidate	Votes	%
Democratic	Sylvester Turner (incumbent)	5,231	100.00%
Total votes		5,231	100.00%
General election
Democratic	Sylvester Turner (incumbent)	39,022	77.08%
Republican	Sam Brocato	11,604	22.92%
Total votes		50,626	100.00%

2014 Texas House of Representatives 139th district election
Primary election
Party	Candidate	Votes	%
Democratic	Sylvester Turner (incumbent)	3,847	100.00%
Total votes		3,847	100.00%
General election
Democratic	Sylvester Turner (incumbent)	21,802	100.00%
Total votes		21,802	100.00%

=== Houston Mayor ===
1991 Houston mayoral election
Primary election
Party	Candidate	Votes	%
Nonpartisan	Bob Lanier	138,096	43.66%
Nonpartisan	Sylvester Turner	113,782	35.98%
Nonpartisan	Kathy Whitmire (incumbent)	63,613	20.11%
Nonpartisan	Willie M. Reid	787	0.25%
General election
Nonpartisan	Bob Lanier	152,792	53.06%
Nonpartisan	Sylvester Turner	135,173	46.94%
Total votes		287,965	100.00%

2003 Houston mayoral primary
Party	Candidate	Votes	%
Nonpartisan	Bill White	111,596	38.05%
Nonpartisan	Orlando Sanchez	98,072	33.44%
Nonpartisan	Sylvester Turner	82,225	28.04%
Nonpartisan	Anthony Dutrow	401	0.14%
Nonpartisan	John Worldpeace	364	0.12%
Nonpartisan	Jack Terence	320	0.11%
Nonpartisan	Luis Ralph Ullrich, Jr.	311	0.11%
Total votes		293,289	100.00%

2015 Houston mayoral election
Primary election
Party	Candidate	Votes	%
Nonpartisan	Sylvester Turner	81,735	31.31%
Nonpartisan	Bill King	65,968	25.27%
Nonpartisan	Adrian Garcia	44,758	17.14%
Nonpartisan	Ben Hall	24,805	9.50%
Nonpartisan	Chris Bell	19,345	7.41%
Nonpartisan	Steve Costello	17,546	6.72%
Nonpartisan	Hoc Thai Nguyen	2,325	0.89%
Nonpartisan	Marty McVey	1,378	0.53%
Nonpartisan	Demetria Smith	1,234	0.47%
Nonpartisan	Victoria A. Lane	908	0.35%
Nonpartisan	Rafael Muñoz Jr.	515	0.20%
Nonpartisan	Dale Steffes	302	0.12%
Nonpartisan	Joe Ferreira	240	0.09%
Total votes		261,059	100.00%
General election
Nonpartisan	Sylvester Turner	104,639	50.16%
Nonpartisan	Bill King	103,961	49.84%
Total votes		208,600	100.00%

2019 Houston mayoral election
Primary election
Party	Candidate	Votes	%
Nonpartisan	Sylvester Turner (incumbent)	111,789	46.38%
Nonpartisan	Tony Buzbee	69,361	28.78%
Nonpartisan	Bill King	33,772	14.01%
Nonpartisan	Dwight Boykins	14,212	5.90%
Nonpartisan	Victoria Romero	2,933	1.22%
Nonpartisan	Sue Lovell	2,932	1.22%
Nonpartisan	Demetria Smith	1,694	0.70%
Nonpartisan	Roy Vasquez	1,556	0.65%
Nonpartisan	Kendall Baker	982	0.41%
Nonpartisan	Derrick Broze	686	0.28%
Nonpartisan	Naoufal Houjami	560	0.23%
Nonpartisan	Johnny Taylor	555	0.23%
Total votes		241,032	100.00%
General election
Nonpartisan	Sylvester Turner (incumbent)	113,262	56.04%
Nonpartisan	Tony Buzbee	88,844	43.96%
Total votes		202,106	100.00%

=== U.S. House of Representatives ===
2024 Texas 18th congressional district election
Party	Candidate	Votes	%
Democratic	Sylvester Turner	151,834	69.42%
Republican	Lana Centonze	66,810	30.55%
Independent	Vince Duncan (write-in)	62	0.03%
Independent	Kevin Dural (write-in)	14	0.01%
Total votes		218,720	100.00%
Democratic hold			

== See also ==
- List of members of the United States Congress who died in office (2000–present)
- List of United States representatives who served a single term

Political offices
Preceded by Annise Parker	Mayor of Houston; 2016–2024	Succeeded by John Whitmire
U.S. House of Representatives
Preceded by Erica Lee Carter	Member of the U.S. House of Representatives from Texas's 18th congressional district 2025	Succeeded by Christian Menefee
