= Eileen Donahoe =

American attorney, human rights advocate, and former ambassador

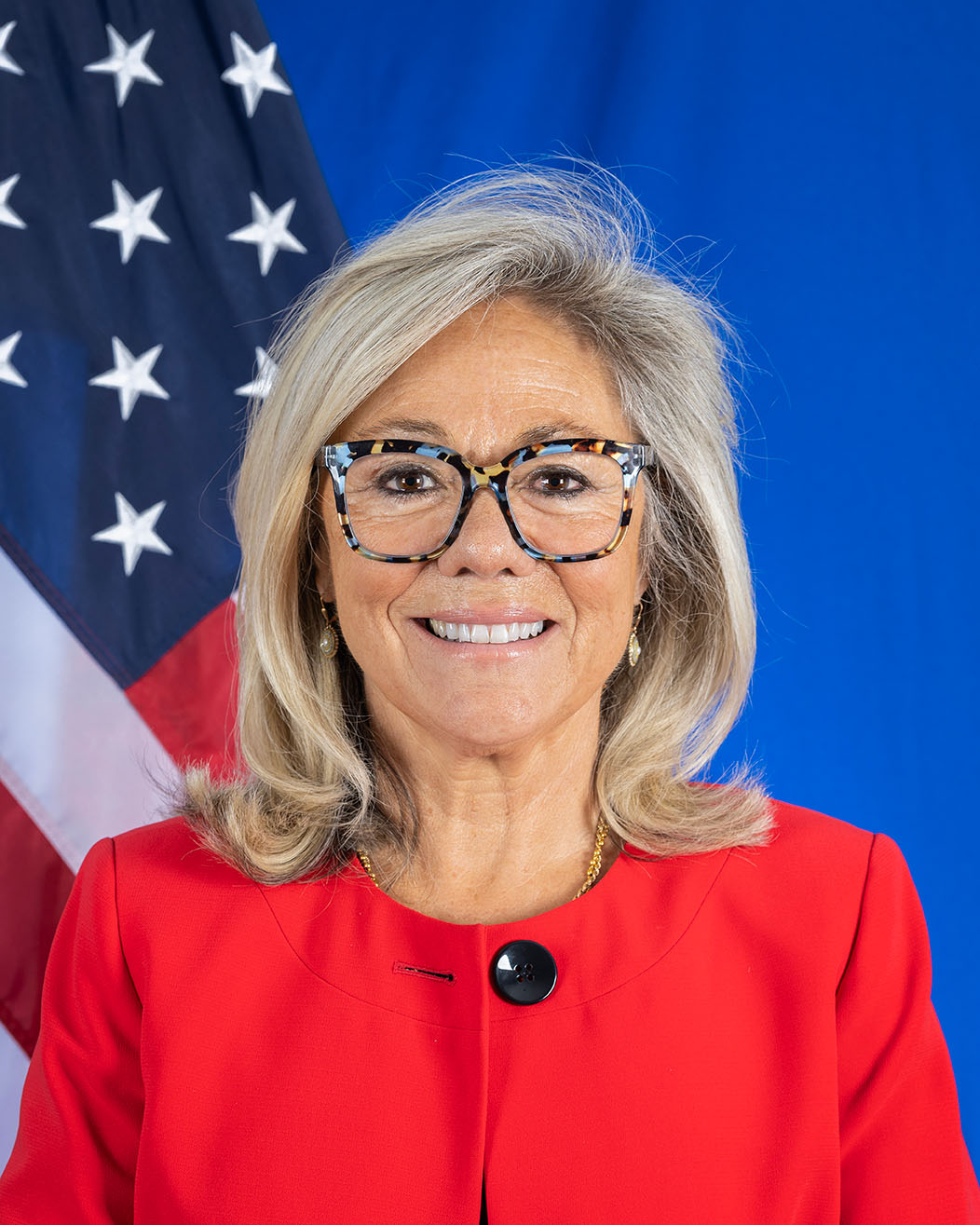
- Official portrait, 2023

Special Envoy and Coordinator for Digital Freedom
- In office September 5, 2023 – December 13, 2024
- President: Joe Biden
- Preceded by: Position established

19th United States Ambassador to the United Nations Human Rights Council
- In office 2010–2013
- President: Barack Obama
- Preceded by: Rudy Boschwitz (as ambassador to the Commission on Human Rights)
- Succeeded by: Keith M. Harper

Personal details
- Born: Eileen Chamberlain
- Party: Democratic
- Spouse: John Donahoe
- Children: 4
- Education: Dartmouth College; Stanford University; Harvard University

Eileen Donahoe (née Chamberlain) is an American human rights activist and former U.S. diplomat who recently served as U.S. Special Envoy and Coordinator for Digital Freedom at the Department of State. Previously, she served as U.S. Ambassador to the United Nations Human Rights Council, having been appointed by President Barack Obama in 2009. She was the first ambassador following the referent UN body changing from the predecessor United Nations Commission on Human Rights. After serving her term as ambassador, Donahoe was appointed as Director of Global Affairs for Human Rights Watch, where she focused on digital security and Internet governance. She then founded and served as Executive Director of the Global Digital Policy Incubator at the Freeman Spogli Institute's Cyber Policy Center working at the intersection of governance, technology and human rights. She was an affiliate of Stanford University's Center for International Security and Cooperation, a center of the Freeman Spogli Institute for International Studies.

In 2023, Donahoe took a leave of absence from her position at Stanford University to serve as the inaugural Special Envoy and Coordinator for Digital Freedom, in the newly established Bureau of Cyberspace and Digital Policy in the U.S. Department of State. In this role, Donahoe worked to promote digital freedom and a rights-respecting approach to U.S. technology policy. She left the role on December 13, 2024.

She currently serves as Vice Chair of the National Endowment for Democracy Board of Directors and on the Board of Trustees of the Carnegie Endowment for International Peace. She is also a Trustee of Dartmouth College.

== Education ==
Donahoe holds a bachelor's degree in American Studies from Dartmouth College, and she received her JD and master's degree in East Asian Studies from Stanford. She also earned a master's degree in Theological Studies from Harvard University, and a PhD in Ethics and Social Theory from the Graduate Theological Union, an affiliate of University of California, Berkeley.

== Career ==
Donahoe’s professional career began in litigation, with the law firm Fenwick & West in Silicon Valley, where she worked as a technology litigator. For a time, she served as a law clerk for the United States District Court for the Northern District of California and Judge William H. Orrick Jr.

In 2006 she published her PhD dissertation on the topic of Humanitarian Military Intervention. The dissertation addressed conflicting moral imperatives versus the rule of law justifications associated with military intervention during humanitarian crises.

Other areas of interest for her research include the connection between US foreign policy and human rights for The Lawyers Committee for Human Rights (now Human Rights First), and strategies on the human rights of women and children for Amnesty International’s Ginetta Sagan Fund.

In September 2023, she was appointed as Special Envoy and Coordinator for Digital Freedom in the U.S. Department of State’s Bureau of Cyberspace and Digital Policy (CDP).

== Human rights advocacy ==
On November 9, 2009, the Obama administration nominated Donahoe to be the first U.S. ambassador to the United Nations Human Rights Council in Geneva. This was subsequently approved by the Senate, and Donahoe was appointed to the position where she represented the lead body in the promotion and protection of human rights.

During her role as Ambassador, Donahoe was actively engaged in advocacy for human rights, liberty, dignity, justice, and opportunity during a period marked by transformative change. Throughout her three-year term she spearheaded the effort to protect freedom of expression on the Internet, which culminated in all 47 member states of the UN Human Rights Council voting to include this as a basic human right, and took action on various urgent human rights crises of the time, including Cote d’Ivoire, Syria to Libya, Iran and more.

Following her successful tenure serving her term as UN Ambassador, Donahoe was selected to the role of Director of Global Affairs for Human Rights Watch, where she was particularly focussed on the areas of Internet freedom, security, and governance in relation to global human rights foreign policy. Ahead of the US presidential and congressional midterm elections in 2017 and 2018, Donahoe held the role of Executive Director of the Global Digital Policy Incubator at Stanford University, where she engaged in several conversations, panels, podcasts, and papers advocating for freedom, security, and democratic accountability in the digital world.

Her podcast with Quinta Jurecic and Alina Polyakova, the president and CEO of the Center for European Policy Analysis, covered the topic combatting digital authoritarianism, protecting freedom of expression and privacy, and the use of international human rights law frameworks to protect and moderate digital commentary.

Again, in 2020, with a new US election looming, Donahoe made the case for internet platforms to exercise the protection of democracy and for private sector platforms to exercise their rights to combat political disinformation through leaning toward a stronger governance and articulation of their digital powers. This post was published following the Republican and Democratic parties threatening to revoke the Communications Decency Act Section 230, a law that is essential to the protection of free speech online.

Following the Trump Administration’s withdrawal from the UN Human Rights Council in 2018, the newly appointed Biden Administration announced plans to rejoin the Council in 2021, a move which Donahoe indicated she supported during an interview with NPR’s Michele Kelemen. Donahoe presented her comments that the US should have a seat at the table with human rights diplomacy, especially at a time when the aspirations and values of human rights commitments are being challenged in 21st century digital society and are in danger of succumbing to digital authoritarianism, highlighting the emerging of China’s archetype of digital authoritarianism as a momentous event in history during a time of China’s growing influence and increasing push for power.

On November 29, 2022, Donahoe hosted the Tech4Democracy Silicon Valley Venture Day and encouraged a new way of thinking with regards to reinforcing democracy through concentrating on advancing and applying the newly emerging opportunities of technology that can boost democracy.

== Other activities ==
- Transatlantic Commission on Election Integrity (TCEI), Member (since 2018)
- Benetech, Member of the Human Rights Advisory Board (since 2016)
- National Endowment for Democracy, Vice Chair of the Board of Directors
- World Economic Forum (WEF), Member of the Council on the Future of Human Rights
- University of Essex, Member of the Advisory Board on Human Rights, Big Data and Technology
- Freedom Online Coalition, Member of the Advisory Network
- Board member of Zev Shapiro's organization TurnUp
- Member of the Council on Foreign Relations

== Personal life ==
She is married to John Donahoe who has been the CEO of tech companies like eBay, PayPal, ServiceNow, and Nike. They have four children, three sons and a daughter, and live in Portola Valley, California. In 2021, Donahoe and her husband donated $20 million to Dartmouth College. The donation is intended to increase diversity in science, technology, engineering and math.
