= Cristina Tzintzún Ramirez =

American labor organizer and writer (born 1982)

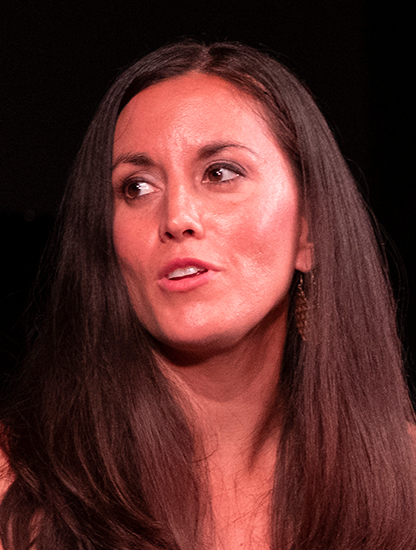
- Born: Cristina Costello; January 8, 1982 (age 44); Moxahala, Ohio, U.S.
- Education: University of Texas at Austin (BA)
- Occupations: Labor organizer, writer
- Political party: Democratic
- Spouse: Jose Manuel Ramirez (m. 2015; div. 2019)
- Children: 1

Cristina Tzintzún Ramirez (born Cristina Costello; 1982) is an American labor organizer and writer. From August 12, 2019, until March 3, 2020, Tzintzún Ramirez was a potential challenger to incumbent United States Senator John Cornyn in the 2020 United States Senate election in Texas as part of a twelve-person Democratic primary, in which she placed third.

== Early life and education ==
Her mother, Ana Tzintzún, is from a rural agricultural community in Michoacán, Mexico, and her father, Tom Costello, is an American who came to live in Mexico in the 1960s and 1970s. Tzintzún's original surname was Costello, which she changed to Tzintzún as a teenager. She was born and raised in Ohio, where her parents operated a fair-trade Mexican jewelry business. The family business required that the Tzintzún family live and travel to Mexico throughout her early life. Her parents, both progressive, encouraged their children to participate in various causes, especially those involving the Latino immigrant community. In high school, Tzintzún began organizing and working with newly-arrived Mexican immigrants in Ohio. She graduated from University of Texas at Austin (UT Austin) in 2006 with a Bachelor of Liberal Arts in Latin American studies.

== Career ==
Tzintzún began organizing with Latino immigrant workers in 2000 in Columbus, Ohio, and then moved to Texas, where she helped establish the Workers Defense Project (WDP), serving as its Executive Director from 2006 until 2016.

At the WDP, Tzintzún and co-founder Emily Timm led the organization to focus its efforts on the construction industry, the largest employer of undocumented labor in Texas. She helped spearhead the organization's efforts to organize workers in one of the most-hostile political climates for worker and immigrant organizing in the country.

Tzintzún served as the lead coordinator of immigrant mobilizations and strikes in Austin, Texas, on April 10, 2006 and May 1, 2006. It was estimated that 60% of restaurants and 80% of construction sites closed in Austin for the strike.

In 2008, Tzintzún co-founded the Austin Immigrant Rights Coalition (AIRC), which brings together stakeholders across the city to advocate for the rights of immigrants.

Tzintzún helped lead the organization to pass over half a dozen local ordinances and state laws better protecting the rights of hundreds of thousands of workers by combining grassroots organizing, strategic research and smart communications strategies. She co-authored two reports on construction workers in Texas that resulted in a federal investigation by the Occupational Safety and Health Administration (OSHA) and led the agency to review 900 construction sites resulting in $2 million in fines.

Tzintzún created and developed the organization's Better Builder Program, which won construction workers living wages, higher safety standards, training and on-site enforcement by Better Builder monitors against some of the largest corporations in the world. At the close of 2015, the Better Builder program had won agreements on nearly a billion dollars in construction projects covering 10,000 workers. A quarter of workers surveyed on Better Builder sites reported receiving a raise from their last job, 38% reported receiving safety training for the first-time and 30% reported receiving workers’ compensation coverage for the first time in their construction careers.

In 2017, Tzintzún founded Jolt, a civil rights organization that works to increase voter turnout among Latinos in Texas.

On August 12, 2019, Tzintzún announced her intention to challenge incumbent United States Senator John Cornyn in the 2020 United States Senate election in Texas as a progressive candidate. Her bid was endorsed by New York representative Alexandria Ocasio-Cortez, Texas representative Joaquin Castro, and actor Alec Baldwin, as well as by the PACs Blue America and Latino Victory Fund, labor unions UNITE HERE Local 23 and Communications Workers of America, 350 Action, the Working Families Party, and the University of Texas at Austin University Democrats. Tzintzún’s campaign was criticized for also accepting an endorsement from actress Susan Sarandon, who had supported Green Party candidate Jill Stein over Hillary Clinton in the 2016 presidential election. She received additional criticism for her comments made in a speech, in which she said:

Tzintzún is more Mexican than any Garcia or Lopez. We were the only indigenous group in Mexico that were not defeated by the Aztecs. So you know I come from good lineage and I'm ready to defeat John Cornyn.

Ultimately, Tzintzún placed third in the March 3, 2020 Democratic primary with 13.2% of the vote. She and fellow former candidates Chris Bell and Michael Cooper then endorsed Royce West, who had advanced with MJ Hegar to the Democratic primary runoff.

=== Electoral history ===
Democratic primary results
Party	Candidate	Votes	%
Democratic	MJ Hegar	411,369	22.37%
Democratic	Royce West	267,236	14.53%
Democratic	Cristina Tzintzún Ramirez	244,004	13.27%
Democratic	Annie "Mamá" Garcia	190,342	10.35%
Democratic	Amanda Edwards	184,467	10.03%
Democratic	Chris Bell	156,238	8.49%
Democratic	Sema Hernandez	136,549	7.42%
Democratic	Michael Cooper	90,990	4.95%
Democratic	Victor Hugo Harris	59,018	3.21%
Democratic	Adrian Ocegueda	40,929	2.23%
Democratic	Jack Daniel Foster, Jr.	31,425	1.71%
Democratic	D.R. Hunter	26,691	1.45%
Total votes		1,839,258	100.0%

== Personal life ==
Tzintzún married Jose Manuel Ramirez on November 13, 2015. The couple has a son, Santiago Tzintzún Ramirez, who was born in 2017. Tzintzún took her husband's surname, Ramirez, after they were married in 2015. The couple divorced in December 2019.

== Boards ==
She is a board member of Zev Shapiro's organization TurnUp.

== Honors and awards ==
- Tribeza Magazine, People of the Year Award, 2018
- Roddenberry Foundation, Fellowship, 2018
- J.M. Kaplan, Innovation Award Winner, 2017
- The Austin Chronicle, Best Working Class Hero, 2015
- The Texas Observer, Change Maker, 2014
- Greater Austin Hispanic Chamber of Commerce, Capital of Texas Awards: Non-Profit Leader, 2014
- Center for Public Policy Priorities, Future of Texas, 2014
- Southern Living Magazine, Hero of the New South, 2013
- Interfaith Worker Justice, Rising Star, 2013
- Berger-Marks Foundation, Edna Award of Distinction, 2013
- Engineering News-Record, Top 25 Industry Newsmakers, 2013
- Labor Council for Latin American Advancement, National Trabajadora Community Leader Award, 2012

== Selected works ==
Tzintzún is also an author on issues of race, gender and immigration her work has appeared in The Huffington Post, The Dallas Morning News and Al Jazeera and in the following publications:

- Presente! Latino Immigrant Voices in the Struggle for Racial Justice" Co-Editor, AK Press, 2014 ISBN 978-1849351669
- "Build a Better Texas: Construction Working Conditions in the Lone Star State", University of Texas at Austin, 2013 Co-Author
- "Building a Better Nation: A Case for Comprehensive Immigration Reform" University of Texas at Austin, 2013
- "Building Austin Building Injustice: Working Conditions in Austin's Construction Industry" University of Texas at Austin, 2009
- "Killing Misogyny: A Personal Story of Love, Violence and Strategies for Survival" in: "Yes Means Yes! Visions of Female Sexual Power & A World Without Rape. Seal Press, 2008 ISBN 9781580052573
- "Colonize This!" in: Colonize This!: Young Women of Color on Today's Feminism, Edited by Daisy Hernández and Bushra Rehman. New York. Seal Press, 2002 ISBN 9781580050678
- "Protecting Immigrant Workers" National Housing Institute: ShelterForce Sept. 1 2015
