= Rita Hauser =

American lawyer

United States Ambassador to the United Nations Human Rights Council
- In office February 1969 – March 1972
- President: Richard Nixon
- Preceded by: Morris B. Abram
- Succeeded by: Philip Hoffman

Personal details
- Born: July 12, 1934 (age 92) New York City, U.S.
- Party: Republican
- Education: Hunter College; University of Strasbourg; Harvard University; University of Paris; New York University

Rita Eleanor Hauser (born July 12, 1934) is an international lawyer known for persuading Yasser Arafat and the Palestine Liberation Organization to renounce violence in 1988. She also served as United States Ambassador to the United Nations Commission on Human Rights from 1969 to 1972. George W. Bush appointed her to the President's Intelligence Advisory Board in 2001, serving through 2004, and she was appointed again by Barack Obama in 2009.

== Early life and education ==
Born of Jewish parents, Hauser was the elder of two daughters of Nathan and Frieda (Litt) Abrams, Rita Eleanor (Abrams).

In 1954, Hauser received a B.A. from Hunter College in New York, after which she was awarded a Fulbright scholarship for graduate work in France, which eventually resulted in receiving a doctorate in political economy from the University of Strasbourg. She attended Harvard Law School for a while, then received a license en droit from the University of Paris (a rarity for an American) in 1958, then later received an LL.B. in 1959 from the New York University School of Law.

== Career ==
Hauser served as co-chair of "New Yorkers for Nixon" during Richard Nixon’s successful 1968 presidential campaign. She then became the United States representative to the United Nations Commission on Human Rights (1969–1972). She also served as a member of the United States delegation to the twenty-fourth UN General Assembly.

During her time at the UN that she met many key players in Middle East politics and became committed to her pursuit of conflict resolution in the Middle East, human rights and humanitarian law. During her term at the UN, she helped Jewish immigrants leave Russia and visited Palestinian refugee camps throughout the Middle East.

During this period she also met Israeli prime minister Golda Meir, who soon became her mentor and role model. Meir inspired Hauser's involvement in Middle East politics and encouraged her, a secular Jew, to learn more about Jewish history and her own Jewishness. In 1979, Hauser resigned from John Connally's campaign committee after Connally demanded a two-state solution that would have required Israel to withdraw from all territories it occupied during the Six-Day War in exchange for American support.

For more than twenty years, Hauser was a senior partner at Stroock & Stroock & Lavan in New York.

Hauser formerly chaired the International Peace Institute and was chair of the advisory board of the International Crisis Group, was elected in 2007 to the board of the Global Humanitarian Forum in Geneva, Switzerland, formerly chaired the American Ditchley Foundation, has served as a director of the RAND Corporation, the International Institute for Strategic Studies, the Lincoln Center for the Performing Arts and the New York Philharmonic Society. She also served as an advisory board member for the Partnership for a Secure America.

She and her husband established the Hauser Center for Nonprofit Organizations at Harvard Kennedy School of Government, and she is co-chair of the Dean's advisory board at Harvard Law School, and the Hausers also were the principal benefactors of the Hauser Global Law School Program at New York University School of Law.

A self-described Rockefeller Republican, Hauser supported Barack Obama in the 2008 United States presidential election.

Diplomatic posts
Preceded by Morris B. Abram	United States Ambassador to the United Nations Human Rights Council; 1969–1972	Succeeded by Philip Hoffman
