= 2020 United States Senate election in Texas =

- November 3, 2020
- Turnout: 65.73% ▲32.6%
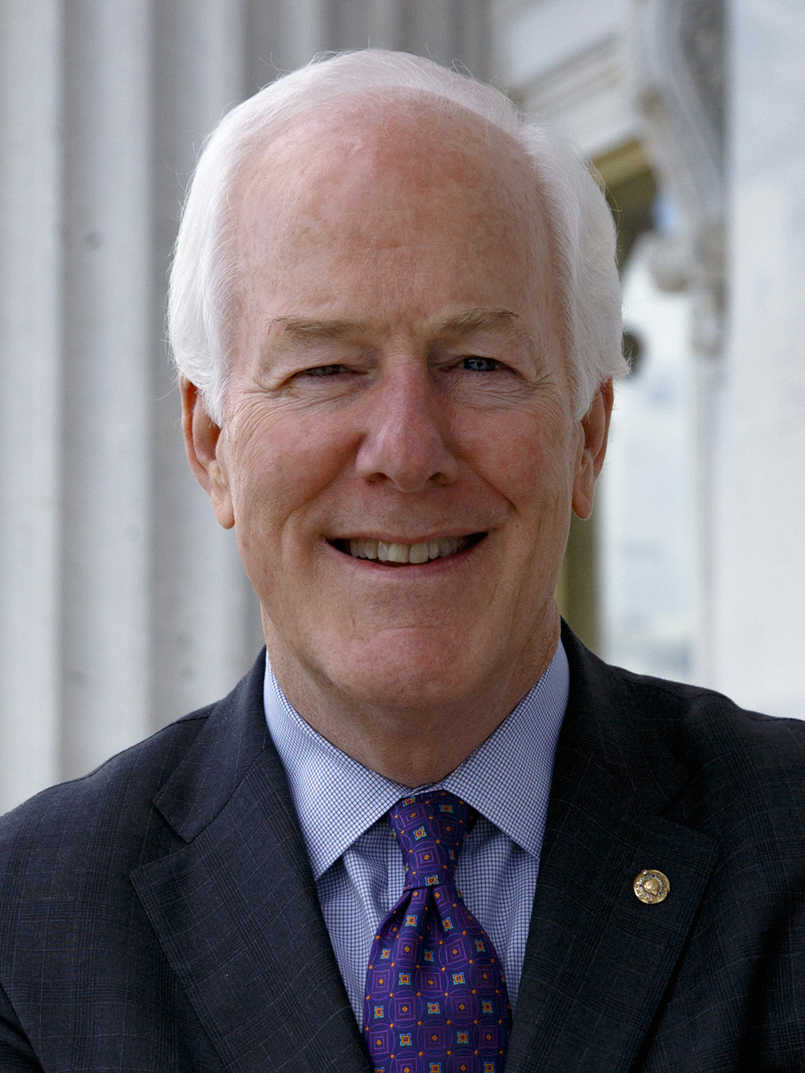

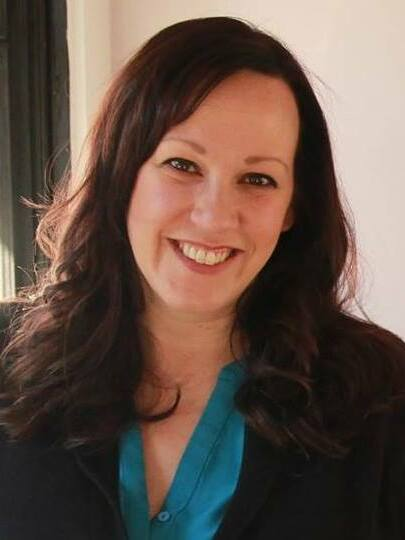
Nominee	John Cornyn	M. J. Hegar
Party	Republican	Democratic
Popular vote	5,962,983	4,889,384
Percentage	53.51%	43.87%
- Cornyn: 40–50% 50–60% 60–70% 70–80% 80–90% >90% Hegar: 40–50% 50–60% 60–70% 70–80% 80–90% >90% No data
U.S. senator before election
John Cornyn
Republican
Elected U.S. Senator
John Cornyn
Republican

The 2020 United States Senate election in Texas was held on November 3, 2020, to elect a member to the United States Senate to represent the State of Texas, concurrently with the 2020 U.S. presidential election, elections to the United States Senate in other states, elections to the United States House of Representatives, and various state and local elections. Incumbent Republican Senator John Cornyn won a fourth term against Democratic nominee MJ Hegar by 9.6%.

Prior to the election, most news organizations projected this race as "Lean Republican", and was not expected to be as competitive as the contest for Texas's other Senate seat two years prior, when Republican incumbent Ted Cruz defeated Democrat Beto O'Rourke by a 2.6% margin. Nonetheless, John Cornyn won in what was his worst performance out of his four elections for the U.S. Senate, while MJ Hegar's 43.9% marked the highest vote share of any of Cornyn's Democratic challengers. Despite this being Cornyn's worst performance percentage-wise, he more than doubled his 2014 vote count and received what was then the most raw votes for a Republican U.S. Senate candidate in the history of the United States; this record was later surpassed by Steve Garvey in California in 2024.

Cornyn outperformed President Donald Trump in the state by about 4%, and was able to carry two counties won by Joe Biden (Tarrant and Williamson). While Cornyn did better than Trump in the Texas Triangle, contributing to his over performance, Hegar slightly outperformed Biden in the heavily Hispanic Rio Grande Valley, and was able to carry one Trump county (Zapata), though Hegar herself vastly underperformed previous Democratic margins in the region.

== Republican primary ==
=== Candidates ===
==== Nominee ====
- John Cornyn, incumbent U.S. senator

==== Eliminated in the primary ====
- Virgil Bierschwale, U.S. Navy veteran, software developer, realtor
- John Anthony Castro, tax consultant, author, businessman, entrepreneur
- Dwayne Stovall, bridge construction contractor, businessman
- Mark Yancey, businessman, Attacca International Executive, former owner of the Dallas Wings basketball team

==== Declined ====
- Pat Fallon, state senator
- Dan Patrick, lieutenant governor of Texas (endorsed John Cornyn)
- Allen West, former U.S. representative for Florida's 22nd congressional district (running for state party chair)

=== Endorsements ===
John Cornyn

U.S. senators

- Ted Cruz, U.S. senator from Texas

Statewide officials

- Dan Patrick, lieutenant governor of Texas

=== Polling ===
Poll source	Date(s) administered	Sample size (Note: Key: A – all adults RV – registered voters LV – likely voters V – unclear)	Margin of error	Virgil Bierschwale	John Anthony Castro	John Cornyn	Dwayne Stovall	Mark Yancey	Undecided
University of Texas at Tyler/Dallas News	January 21–30, 2020	445 (LV)	± 4.65%	<1%	5%	62%	3%	1%	30%
Data for Progress (Note: Data for Progress had endorsed the Elizabeth Warren 2020 presidential campaign prior to the sampling period)	January 16–21, 2020	687 (LV)	–	1%	0%	75%	2%	1%	22%

=== Results ===
Results by county: Cornyn: Cornyn—80–90%; Cornyn—70–80%; Cornyn—60–70%; Cornyn—50–60%

Republican primary results
Party	Candidate	Votes	%
Republican	John Cornyn (incumbent)	1,470,669	76.04%
Republican	Dwayne Stovall	231,104	11.95%
Republican	Mark Yancey	124,864	6.46%
Republican	John Anthony Castro	86,916	4.49%
Republican	Virgil Bierschwale	20,494	1.06%
Total votes		1,934,047	100.0%

== Democratic primary ==
=== Candidates ===
==== Nominee ====
- MJ Hegar, retired United States Air Force major, businesswoman, author, teacher, and Democratic Party nominee for Texas's 31st congressional district in 2018

==== Eliminated in the runoff ====
- Royce West, state senator, former president pro tempore of the Texas Senate, attorney

==== Eliminated in the primary ====
- Chris Bell, former U.S. representative for Texas's 25th congressional district, nominee for governor of Texas in 2006, candidate for mayor of Houston in 2015
- Michael Cooper, pastor and candidate for lieutenant governor of Texas in 2018
- Amanda Edwards, Houston city councillor
- Jack Daniel Foster Jr., educator
- Annie "Mamá" Garcia, attorney, small-business owner, and non-profit founder
- Victor Hugo Harris, U.S. Army Reserve colonel
- Sema Hernandez, organizer for the Poor People's Campaign and candidate for the U.S. Senate in 2018
- D. R. Hunter, retiree
- Adrian Ocegueda, financial analyst and candidate for governor of Texas in 2018
- Cristina Tzintzún Ramirez, labor organizer and author

==== Withdrawn ====
- John B. Love III, Midland city councillor
- Hunter Darrel Reece
- David Selig

==== Declined ====
- Joaquín Castro, incumbent U.S. representative for Texas's 20th congressional district
- Julián Castro, former United States Secretary of Housing and Urban Development, former mayor of San Antonio and former 2020 presidential candidate
- Beto O'Rourke, former U.S. representative for Texas's 16th congressional district, nominee for the U.S. Senate in 2018 and former 2020 presidential candidate

=== Endorsements ===
MJ Hegar

Federal officials

- Tammy Duckworth, U.S. senator from Illinois and former U.S. representative (IL-08) (2013–2017) and U.S. assistant secretary of veterans affairs (2009–2011)
- Veronica Escobar, U.S. representative from (Texas's 16th congressional district)
- Elizabeth Warren, U.S. senator from Massachusetts and 2020 Democratic presidential candidate

Newspapers

- Austin American-Statesman

Organizations

- DSCC
- EMILY's List
- End Citizens United
- Everytown for Gun Safety Action Fund
- Giffords
- Planned Parenthood Action Fund
- NARAL Pro-Choice America
Cristina Tzintzún Ramirez (eliminated)

Federal officials

- Joaquin Castro, U.S. representative (TX-20)
- Alexandria Ocasio-Cortez, U.S. representative (NY-14)

Labor unions

- Communications Workers of America District 6

Newspapers

- Austin Chronicle
- Daily Texan

Organizations

- Working Families Party

Individuals

- Alec Baldwin, actor
Royce West (eliminated)

Federal officials

- Chris Bell, Democratic candidate in the 2020 U.S. Senate election in Texas and former U.S. representative (TX-25) (2003–2005)
- Eddie Bernice Johnson, U.S. representative (TX-30)
- Ron Kirk, former U.S. trade representative (2009–2013), mayor of Dallas (1995–2002), and Texas secretary of state (1994–1995)
- Carol Moseley Braun, former U.S. ambassador to New Zealand and Samoa (1999–2001) and U.S. Senator (IL) (1993–1999)
- Maxine Waters, U.S. representative (CA-43)

State officials

- Rhetta Bowers, state representative
- Sheryl Cole, state representative
- Nicole Collier, state representative
- Gina Hinojosa, state representative
- Celia Israel, state representative
- Jarvis Johnson, state representative
- Nathan Johnson, state senator
- Jose Menendez, state senator
- Evelina Ortega, state representative
- Morris Overstreet, former Texas Court of Criminal Appeals judge (1991–1999)
- Toni Rose, state representative
- Shawn Thierry, state representative
- John Turner, state representative
- Armando Walle, state representative

Local officials

- Amanda Edwards, Democratic candidate in the 2020 U.S. Senate election in Texas and former Houston City Council member (2016–2020)
- Sylvester Turner, mayor of Houston and former state representative (1989–2016)

Organizations

- American Federation of Teachers Texas Chapter
- Communications Workers of America (originally endorsed Cristina Tzintzún Ramirez)
- Congressional Black Caucus (CBC) PAC
- Democracy for America
- Working Families Party (originally endorsed Cristina Tzintzún Ramirez)

Newspapers

- Austin Chronicle (originally endorsed Cristina Tzintzún Ramirez)
- Dallas Morning News (co-endorsed with Amanda Edwards)
- Fort Worth Star-Telegram
- Houston Chronicle

Individuals

- Cristina Tzintzún Ramirez, Democratic candidate in the 2020 U.S. Senate election in Texas
Amanda Edwards (eliminated)

Newspapers

- Beaumont Enterprise
- Dallas Morning News (co-endorsed with Royce West)
- San Antonio Express-News

Organizations

- Stonewall Democrats of Dallas

Individuals

- Tina Knowles-Lawson, businesswoman and fashion designer

=== First round ===
==== Debates ====
Host network	Date	Link(s)	Participants											
Host network	Date	Link(s)	MJ Hegar	Royce West	Cristina Tzintzún Ramirez	Annie Garcia	Amanda Edwards	Chris Bell	Sema Hernandez	Michael Cooper	Victor Hugo Harris	Adrian Ocegueda	Jack Daniel Foster Jr.	D. R. Hunter
KHOU-11	February 18, 2020		Present	Present	Present	Present	Present	Present	Present	Present	Present	Present	Present	Absent

==== Polling ====
Poll source	Date(s) administered	Sample size	Margin of error	Colin Allred	Chris Bell	Joaquín Castro	Wendy Davis	Amanda Edwards	Annie Garcia	MJ Hegar	Sema Hernandez	Beto O'Rourke	Cristina Ramirez	Royce West	Other	Undecided
NBC News/Marist	February 23–27, 2020	556 (LV)	± 5.3%	–	5%	–	–	7%	–	16%	5%	–	9%	8%	5% (Note: Michael Cooper with 4%; "other" with 1%)	34%
YouGov/University of Texas/Texas Tribune	January 31 – February 9, 2020	575 (LV) (Note: Additional data sourced from FiveThirtyEight)	± 4.09%	–	7%	–	–	6%	5%	22%	5%	–	9%	6%	40% (Note: The five remaining candidates or "someone else" with 34%; refused with 6%)	–
University of Texas at Tyler/Dallas News	January 21–30, 2020	414 (LV)	± 4.8%	–	5%	–	–	4%	6%	9%	4%	–	4%	6%	12% (Note: Michael Cooper, Jack Daniel Foster Jr. and Victor Hugo Harris with 3%; D. R. Hunter with 2%; Adrian Ocegueda with 1%)	52%
Data for Progress (Note: Data for Progress has endorsed the Elizabeth Warren 2020 presidential campaign)	January 16–21, 2020	684 (LV)	± 6.5%	–	8%	–	–	3%	4%	18%	3%	–	13%	12%	4% (Note: Michael Cooper with 2%; Victor Hugo Harris and Adrian Ocegueda with 1%; Jack Daniel Foster Jr., D. R. Hunter, and "not voting" with 0%)	34% (Note: Leaning towards no one candidate, but not leaning towards not voting)
Texas Lyceum	January 10–19, 2020	401 (LV)	± 4.89%	–	5%	–	–	6%	4%	11%	5%	–	7%	8%	35% (Note: Michael Cooper and Victor Hugo Harris with 5%; Adrian Ocegueda with 2%; Jack Daniel Foster Jr. and D. R. Hunter with 0%; other with 6%; none of the above with 17%)	19%
	December 9, 2019	Filing deadline, by which Allred had not declared his candidacy														
	December 6, 2019	Annie Garcia announces her candidacy														
	December 5, 2019	O'Rourke announces he will not run after end of presidential campaign														
Beacon Research (D)	November 9–21, 2019	408 (LV)	–	–	4%	–	–	–	–	6%	6%	58%	–	13%	–	–
University of Texas at Tyler	November 5–14, 2019	427 (RV)	± 4.7%	–	7%	–	–	8%	–	9%	–	–	9%	8%	7%	52%
University of Texas/Texas Tribune	October 18–29, 2019	541 (RV)	± 4.21%	–	3%	–	–	0%	–	12%	6%	–	4%	5%	13% (Note: Michael Cooper with 4%; Jack Daniel Foster Jr. with 2%; Adrian Ocegueda with 1%; "someone else" with 6%)	57%
University of Texas/Texas Tribune	August 29 – September 8, 2019	550 (RV)	± 4.17%	–	2%	–	–	2%	–	11%	3%	–	3%	5%	2% (Note: Michael Cooper with 2%)	66%
Ragnar Research	September 3–5, 2019	600 (LV)	± 3.9%	–	9%	–	–	10%	–	12%	–	–	10%	10%	–	49%
	August 12, 2019	Ramirez announces her candidacy														
Emerson College/Dallas Morning News	August 1–3, 2019	400 (LV)	± 4.9%	–	6.6%	–	–	–	5.2%	9.9%	–	–	–	7.9%	19.1% (Note: "Someone else" with 19.1%)	51.1%
	July 22, 2019	West announces his candidacy and Davis announces a 2020 House bid, confirming she will not run for US Senate														
	July 18, 2019	Edwards announces her candidacy														
	July 3, 2019	Bell announces his candidacy														
	May 1, 2019	Joaquín Castro announces he will not run														
	April 23, 2019	Hegar announces her candidacy														
Change Research	April 18–22, 2019	1,578 (LV)	± 2.5%	6% (Note: With voters who lean towards a given candidate)	–	56%	–	1%	–	4%	–	–	–	3%	31% (Note: Veronica Escobar with 5%; Sylvia Garcia, Clay Jenkins, Sri Preston Kulkarni and Kim Olson with 3%; Rafael Anchia and Lizzie Pannell Fletcher with 1%; Mark Strama with 0%; would not vote with 12%)	–
Public Policy Polling (D) (Note: Poll sponsored by Democracy Toolbox)	March 5–7, 2019	608 (LV)	± 4.0%	–	–	42%	19%	–	–	4%	2%	–	–	–	4% (Note: Michael Cooper with 4%)	29%

==== Results ====
Initial round results by county: Hegar: Hegar—60–70%; Hegar—50–60%; Hegar—40–50%; Hegar—30–40%; Hegar—20–30%; Hegar—<20%; Tie: Tie; West: West—<20%; West—20–30%; West—30–40%; West—40–50%; Ramirez: Ramirez—<20%; Ramirez—20–30%; Ramirez—30–40%; Ramirez—40–50%; Ramirez—50–60%; Garcia: Garcia—<20%; Garcia—20–30%; Garcia—30–40%; Garcia—100%; Edwards: Edwards—<20%; Edwards—20–30%; Edwards—30–40%; Bell: Bell—<20%; Bell—20–30%; Bell—30–40%; Bell—40–50%; Hernandez: Hernandez—<20%; Hernandez—20–30%; Hernandez—30–40%; Cooper: Cooper—<20%; Cooper—20–30%

Democratic primary results
Party	Candidate	Votes	%
Democratic	MJ Hegar	417,160	22.31%
Democratic	Royce West	274,074	14.66%
Democratic	Cristina Tzintzún Ramirez	246,659	13.19%
Democratic	Annie "Mamá" Garcia	191,900	10.27%
Democratic	Amanda Edwards	189,624	10.14%
Democratic	Chris Bell	159,751	8.55%
Democratic	Sema Hernandez	137,892	7.38%
Democratic	Michael Cooper	92,463	4.95%
Democratic	Victor Hugo Harris	59,710	3.19%
Democratic	Adrian Ocegueda	41,566	2.22%
Democratic	Jack Daniel Foster Jr.	31,718	1.70%
Democratic	D. R. Hunter	26,902	1.44%
Total votes		1,869,419	100.0%

=== Runoff ===
==== Polling ====
Poll source	Date(s) administered	Sample size	Margin of error	MJ Hegar	Royce West	Other	Undecided
TargetPoint (Note: Poll conducted for John Cornyn.)	July 8, 2020	830 (LV)	± 3.2%	39%	35%	–	26%
Dallas Morning News/University of Texas at Tyler	June 29 – July 7, 2020	829 (LV)	± 3.4%	35%	22%	11%	32%
Dallas Morning News/University of Texas at Tyler	April 18–27, 2020	447 (RV)	± 4.6%	32%	16%	7%	44%
Data for Progress	January 16–21, 2020	684 (LV)	± 6.5%	48%	19%	–	33%
Ragnar Research	September 3–5, 2019	600 (LV)	± 3.9%	26%	24%	–	50%

==== Debates ====
Host network	Date	Link(s)	Participants	
Host network	Date	Link(s)	MJ Hegar	Royce West
KXAN-TV	June 6, 2020		Present	Present
KVUE	June 29, 2020		Present	Present

Hypothetical polling

with MJ Hegar and Chris Bell

Poll source	Date(s) administered	Sample size	Margin of error	MJ Hegar	Chris Bell	Undecided
Ragnar Research	September 3–5, 2019	600 (LV)	± 3.9%	28%	21%	50%

with MJ Hegar and Amanda Edwards

Poll source	Date(s) administered	Sample size	Margin of error	MJ Hegar	Amanda Edwards	Undecided
Data for Progress	January 16–21, 2020	684 (LV)	± 6.5%	42%	16%	42%

with MJ Hegar and Cristina Tzintzún Ramirez

Poll source	Date(s) administered	Sample size	Margin of error	MJ Hegar	Cristina Ramirez	Undecided
Data for Progress	January 16–21, 2020	684 (LV)	± 6.5%	32%	33%	35%

==== Results ====

Democratic primary runoff results
Party	Candidate	Votes	%
Democratic	MJ Hegar	502,516	52.24%
Democratic	Royce West	459,457	47.76%
Total votes		961,973	100.0%

== Other candidates ==
=== Libertarian Party ===
==== Candidates ====
===== Nominee =====
- Kerry McKennon, Libertarian nominee for lieutenant governor of Texas in 2018

===== Withdrawn =====
- Wes Benedict, former national executive director of the Libertarian Party
- Rhett Rosenquest Smith, Libertarian nominee for the Precinct 2 Bexar County justice of the peace in 2020 and Libertarian nominee for Texas's 11th congressional district in 2018

=== Green Party ===
==== Nominee ====
- David B. Collins, info tech trainer and Green nominee for U.S. Senate in 2012

=== People Over Politics Party ===
==== Withdrawn ====
- Cedric Jefferson

=== Human Rights Party ===
==== Withdrawn ====
- James Brumley

=== Independents ===
==== Declared ====
- Ricardo Turullols-Bonilla, retired teacher and candidate for Austin city council in 2014 (as a write-in candidate)

==== Withdrawn ====
- Tim Smith
- Arjun Srinivasan
- Krisjiannis Vittato, teacher and ex-filmmaker

== General election ==
=== Debate ===
Host	Date & time	Link(s)	Participants	
Host	Date & time	Link(s)	John Cornyn (R)	MJ Hegar (D)
Texas State History Museum	October 9, 2020; 6:55pm MDT		Present	Present

=== Predictions ===
Source	Ranking	As of
Daily Kos	Lean R	October 30, 2020
The Cook Political Report	Lean R	October 29, 2020
Inside Elections	Lean R	October 28, 2020
538	Likely R	November 2, 2020
RCP	Lean R	October 23, 2020
DDHQ	Likely R	November 3, 2020
Politico	Lean R	November 2, 2020
Sabato's Crystal Ball	Lean R	November 2, 2020
Economist	Lean R	November 2, 2020

=== Post-primary endorsements ===
John Cornyn (R)

U.S. presidents

- Donald Trump, 45th president of the United States (2017–2021)

U.S. representatives

- Brian Babin, U.S. representative from TX-36 (2015–present)

State and local officials

- Richard Cortez, county judge of Hidalgo County, Texas (2019–present), former mayor of McAllen, Texas (2005–2013)
- Jim Darling, mayor of McAllen, Texas (2013–present)
- Pete Saenz, mayor of Laredo, Texas (2014–present)

Newspapers

- Dallas Morning News

Organizations

- Texas Alliance for Life
- Texas Farm Bureau
- United States Chamber of Commerce
MJ Hegar (D)

U.S. presidents

- Barack Obama, 44th president of the United States (2009–2017), U.S. senator from Illinois (2005–2008)

Federal officials

- Colin Allred, U.S. representative (TX-32)
- Joaquin Castro, U.S. representative (TX-20)
- Kirsten Gillibrand, U.S. senator (NY), former 2020 Democratic presidential candidate, and former U.S. representative (NY-20) (2007–2009)
- Deb Haaland, U.S. representative (NM-01)

State officials

- Cesar Blanco, state representative
- John Bucy III, state representative
- Art Fierro, state representative
- Mary González, state representative
- Vikki Goodwin, state representative
- Armando Martinez, state representative
- Ina Minjarez, state representative
- Joe Moody, speaker pro tempore
- Christina Morales, state representative
- James Talarico, state representative

Local officials

- Steve Adler, mayor of Austin, TX (2016–present)
- Annise Parker, former mayor of Houston (2010–2016)
- Letitia Plummer, Houston City Council member (2020–present)
- Justin Rodriguez, Bexar County commissioner, former state representative

Newspapers

- Austin Chronicle
- El Paso Times
- Houston Chronicle

Organizations

- Brady PAC
- High School Democrats of America
- Houston GLBT Political Caucus
- Human Rights Campaign
- J Street PAC
- Jewish Democratic Council of America
- League of Conservation Voters Action Fund
- Sierra Club
- VoteVets.org

Unions

- American Federation of Teachers
- Communications Workers of America
- Transport Workers Union of America
- United Auto Workers
- United Steelworkers

=== Polling ===
==== Graphical summary ====
View source data.

==== Aggregate polls ====
Source of poll aggregation	Dates administered	Dates updated	John Cornyn (R)	MJ Hegar (D)	Other/ Undecided (Note: Calculated by taking the difference of 100% and all other candidates combined.)	Margin
270 To Win	November 2, 2020	November 3, 2020	48.6%	43.4%	8.0%	Cornyn +5.2
Real Clear Politics	October 31, 2020	November 3, 2020	49.0%	42.5%	8.5%	Cornyn +6.5

Poll source	Date(s) administered	Sample size	Margin of error	John Cornyn (R)	MJ Hegar (D)	Other	Undecided
Swayable	October 27 – November 1, 2020	1,042 (LV)	± 4%	56.5%	43.5%	—	—
Data For Progress	October 27 – November 1, 2020	926 (LV)	± 3.2%	50%	47%	3% (Note: Turullols-Bonilla (I) with 2%; McKennon (L) with 1%; "Other candidate or write-in" with 0%)	—
Emerson College	October 29–31, 2020	763 (LV)	± 3.5%	51%	47%	2% (Note: "Someone else" with 2%)	—
Morning Consult	October 22–31, 2020	3,267 (LV)	± 2%	47%	43%	—	—
Gravis Marketing	October 27–28, 2020	670 (LV)	± 3.8%	49%	43%	—	8%
RMG Research/PoliticalIQ	October 27–28, 2020	800 (LV)	± 3.5%	48% (Note: Standard VI response)	42%	2%	8%
RMG Research/PoliticalIQ	October 27–28, 2020	800 (LV)	± 3.5%	46% (Note: Results generated with high Democratic turnout model)	44%	2%	8%
RMG Research/PoliticalIQ	October 27–28, 2020	800 (LV)	± 3.5%	49% (Note: Results generated with high Republican turnout model)	41%	2%	8%
Swayable	October 23–26, 2020	492 (LV)	± 6%	52%	48%	—	—
YouGov/UMass Lowell	October 20–26, 2020	873 (LV)	± 4.2%	49%	44%	2% (Note: Did not vote with 2%; "Another candidate" with 0%)	5%
Data for Progress (D)	October 22–25, 2020	1,018 (LV)	± 3.1%	48%	46%	2% (Note: McKennon (L) and Turullols-Bonilla (I) with 1%; "Other candidate or write-in" with 0%)	3%
Siena College/NYT Upshot	October 20–25, 2020	802 (LV)	± 3.8%	48%	38%	6% (Note: McKennon (L) with 4%; "Someone else" and would not vote with 1%)	8% (Note: Includes "Refused")
Univision/University of Houston/Latino Decisions/Latino; Decisions/North Star Opinion Research	October 17–25, 2020	758 (RV)	± 3.56%	45%	40%	7% (Note: "Someone else" with 4%; would not vote with 3%)	8%
Citizen Data	October 17–20, 2020	1,000 (LV)	± 3%	41%	41%	4%	15%
YouGov/University of Houston	October 13–20, 2020	1,000 (LV)	± 3.1%	49%	42%	4% (Note: McKennon (L) with 3%; Collins (G) with 1%)	6%
University of Texas at Tyler/Dallas Morning News	October 13–20, 2020	925 (LV)	± 3.2%	42%	34%	5% (Note: McKennon (L) with 3%; Collins (G) with 2%)	18%
Morning Consult	October 11–20, 2020	3,347 (LV)	± 1.7%	46%	41%	—	—
Cygnal	October 18–19, 2020	600 (LV)	± 4%	49%	41%	4%	7%
Quinnipiac University	October 16–19, 2020	1,145 (LV)	± 2.9%	49%	43%	1% (Note: "Someone else" with 1%)	7%
Data for Progress (D)	October 15–18, 2020	933 (LV)	± 3.2%	44%	41%	3% (Note: McKennon (L) with 2%; Turullols-Bonilla (I) with 1%; "Other candidate or write-in" with 0%)	12%
Public Policy Polling	October 14–15, 2020	712 (V)	—	49%	46%	—	5%
Morning Consult	October 2–11, 2020	3,455 (LV)	± 1.7%	47% (Note: Overlapping sample with the previous Morning Consult poll, but more information available regarding sample size)	38%	—	12%
Morning Consult	September 29 – October 8, 2020	~2,700 (LV)	± 2.0%	47% (Note: Overlapping sample with the previous and subsequent Morning Consult polls, but more information available regarding sampling period)	38%	—	—
Morning Consult	September 21–30, 2020	~2,700 (LV)	± 2.0%	46%	39%	—	—
Civiqs/Daily Kos	October 3–6, 2020	895 (LV)	± 3.4%	47%	46%	3% (Note: McKennon (L) with 2%; Collins (G) with 1%; "Someone else" with 0%)	4%
Data For Progress (D)	September 30 – October 5, 2020	1,949 (LV)	± 2.2%	45%	42%	3% (Note: McKennon (L) with 2%; Turullols-Bonilla (I) with 1%)	11%
YouGov/University of Texas/Texas Tribune	September 25 – October 4, 2020	908 (LV)	± 3.25%	50%	42%	5% (Note: McKennon (L) with 3%; "Someone else" with 2%)	—
YouGov/UMass Lowell	September 18–25, 2020	882 (LV)	± 4.3%	50%	40%	1% (Note: "Another candidate" with 1%)	9%
Siena College/NYT Upshot	September 16–22, 2020	653 (LV)	± 4.3%	43%	37%	6% (Note: McKennon (L) with 4%; would not vote with 2%; "someone else" with 0%)	14%
Data For Progress (Note: Poll sponsored by the Defend Students Action Fund.)	September 15–22, 2020	726 (LV)	± 3.6%	40%	38%	—	22%
Quinnipiac University	September 17–21, 2020	1,078 (LV)	± 3.0%	50%	42%	—	7%
Morning Consult	September 11–20, 2020	2,616 (LV)	± (2% – 7%)	45%	39%	—	—
YouGov/CBS	September 15–18, 2020	1,129 (LV)	± 3.5%	46%	41%	3% (Note: "Someone else" with 3%)	10%
Morning Consult	September 8–17, 2020	2,555 (LV)	± (2% – 4%)	45%	38%	—	—
Morning Consult	September 2–11, 2020	~2,700 (LV)	± 2.0%	45%	38%	—	—
Public Policy Polling (D) (Note: Giffords endorsed Hegar to this poll's sampling period)	September 1–2, 2020	743 (V)	—	44%	40%	—	15%
University of Texas at Tyler/Dallas Morning News	August 28 – September 2, 2020	897 (LV)	± 3.3%	39%	28%	5% (Note: McDermott (L) with 3%; Collins (G) with 2%)	28%
University of Texas at Tyler/Dallas Morning News	August 28 – September 2, 2020	1,141 (RV)	± 2.9%	34%	24%	6% (Note: Collins (G) and McDermott (L) with 3%)	36%
Morning Consult	August 23 – September 1, 2020	~2,700 (LV)	± 2.0%	46%	37%	—	—
Tyson Group (Note: Poll sponsored for The Consumer Energy Alliance which is a pro-Keystone XL lobbying group.)	August 20–25, 2020	906 (LV)	± 3%	44%	42%	—	11%
Data for Progress (D) (Note: Poll conducted for the Texas Youth Power Alliance.)	August 20–25, 2020	2,295 (LV)	± 2.0%	46%	40%	—	15%
Morning Consult	August 13–22, 2020	~2,700 (LV)	± 2.0%	44%	39%	—	—
YouGov/Texas Hispanic Policy Foundation/Rice University's Baker Institute	August 4–13, 2020	892 (LV)	± 3.3%	44%	37%	5% (Note: McDermont (L) with 4%; Collins (G) with 1%)	8%
Morning Consult	August 3–12, 2020	~2,700 (LV)	± 2.0%	44%	38%	—	—
Morning Consult	July 24 – August 2, 2020	2,576 (LV)	± 2.0%	44%	38%	4% (Note: "Someone else" with 4%)	14%
Morning Consult	July 23 – August 1, 2020	~2,700 (LV)	± 2.0%	44%	38%	—	—
Global Strategy Group (D) (Note: Poll conducted for Latino Decisions.)	July 25–29, 2020	700 (LV)	± 3.7%	44%	43%	—	13%
Quinnipiac University	July 16–20, 2020	880 (RV)	± 3.3%	47%	38%	3% (Note: "Someone else" with 1%; would not vote with 2%)	13%
Morning Consult	July 13–22, 2020	~2,700 (LV)	± 2.0%	40%	40%	—	—
Spry Strategies (R) (Note: This poll's sponsor is the American Principles Project, a 501 that supports the Republican Party.)	July 16–20, 2020	750 (LV)	± 3.5%	47%	37%	14% (Note: "Another candidate" with 14%)	2%
YouGov/CBS	July 7–10, 2020	1,179 (LV)	± 3.4%	44%	36%	5% (Note: "Someone else" with 4%; would not vote with 1%)	15%
Dallas Morning News/University of Texas at Tyler	June 29 – July 7, 2020	1,677 (LV)	± 2.4%	42%	29%	5%	22%
Public Policy Polling	June 24–25, 2020	729 (RV)	± 3.6%	42%	35%	—	23%
FOX News	June 20–23, 2020	1,001 (RV)	± 3.0%	46%	36%	6% (Note: "Other" and would not vote with 3%)	12%
Dallas Morning News/University of Texas at Tyler	April 18–27, 2020	1,183 (RV)	± 2.9%	37%	24%	6%	34%
NBC News/Marist	February 23–27, 2020	2,409 (RV)	± 2.5%	49%	41%	1%	10%
Beacon Research (D)	November 9–21, 2019	601 (RV)	—	44%	30%	—	26%
Emerson College	April 25–28, 2019	799 (RV)	± 3.4%	29%	12%	16% (Note: "Someone else" with 16%)	44%

Hypothetical polling

with Royce West

Poll source	Date(s) administered	Sample size	Margin of error	John Cornyn (R)	Royce West (D)	Other	Undecided
CBS News/YouGov	July 7–10, 2020	1,182 (LV)	± 3.4%	43%	37%	4% (Note: "Someone else" with 3%; would not vote with 1%)	15%
Dallas Morning News/University of Texas at Tyler	June 29 – July 7, 2020	1,677 (LV)	± 2.4%	43%	28%	6%	23%
FOX News	June 20–23, 2020	1,001 (RV)	± 3.0%	47%	37%	6%	11%
Dallas Morning News/University of Texas at Tyler	April 18–27, 2020	1,183 (RV)	± 2.85%	35%	24%	7%	34%
Beacon Research (D)	November 9–21, 2019	601 (RV)	—	45%	33%	—	22%

with Chris Bell

Poll source	Date(s) administered	Sample size	Margin of error	John Cornyn (R)	Chris Bell (D)	Other	Undecided
Beacon Research (D)	November 9–21, 2019	601 (RV)	—	45%	30%	—	25%

with Sema Hernandez

Poll source	Date(s) administered	Sample size	Margin of error	John Cornyn (R)	Sema Hernandez (D)	Other	Undecided
Beacon Research (D)	November 9–21, 2019	601 (RV)	—	45%	29%	—	26%

with Beto O'Rourke

Poll source	Date(s) administered	Sample size	Margin of error	John Cornyn (R)	Beto O'Rourke (D)	Other	Undecided
Beacon Research (D)	November 9–21, 2019	601 (RV)	—	46%	42%	—	12%
Quinnipiac University	February 20–25, 2019	1,222 (RV)	± 3.4%	46%	46%	1%	6%
Public Policy Polling (D)	February 13–14, 2019	743 (RV)	± 3.6%	47%	45%	—	8%
Atlantic Media & Research (R) (Note: Poll sponsored by Courageous Conservatives PAC)	January 5–11, 2019	504 (LV)	± 4.4%	50%	37%	—	—

with generic Democrat

Poll source	Date(s) administered	Sample size	Margin of error	John Cornyn (R)	Generic Democrat (D)	Other	Undecided
Univision/UH	February 21–26, 2020	1,004 (RV)	± 3.4%	43%	41%	—	16%
Data for Progress	January 16–21, 2020	1,486 (LV)	—	50%	42%	2% (Note: Would not vote with 2%)	7%
Beacon Research (D)	November 9–21, 2019	601 (RV)	—	46%	44%	—	10%
Univision/UH	August 1 – September 6, 2019	1,004 (RV)	± 3.4%	41%	40%	—	19%

with generic Opponent

Poll source	Date(s) administered	Sample size	Margin of error	John Cornyn (R)	Generic Opponent	Other	Undecided
Quinnipiac	September 4–9, 2019	1,410 (RV)	± 3.1%	—	23%	35% (Note: "Would definitely not vote for Cornyn" with 35%)	43% (Note: "Would consider voting for Cornyn" with 30%; "Don't know/no answer" with 13%)

with generic Republican and generic Democrat

Poll source	Date(s) administered	Sample size	Margin of error	Generic Republican (R)	Generic Democrat (D)	Undecided
Cygnal	October 18–19, 2020	600 (LV)	± 4%	50%	43%	7%
Data For Progress (Note: Poll sponsored by the Defend Students Action Fund.)	September 15–22, 2020	726 (LV)	± 3.6%	46%	41%	13%
Public Policy Polling	June 18–19, 2020	907 (V)	± 3%	47%	45%	8%

=== Results ===
2020 United States Senate election in Texas
Party	Candidate	Votes	%	±%
Republican	John Cornyn (incumbent)	5,962,983	53.51%	−8.05%
Democratic	MJ Hegar	4,889,384	43.87%	+9.51%
Libertarian	Kerry McKennon	209,722	1.88%	−1.00%
Green	David Collins	81,893	0.73%	−0.45%
Independent	Ricardo Turullols-Bonilla (write-in)	678	0.01%	N/A
Total votes		11,144,660	100.0%	
Republican hold				

==== By county ====
By county

Legend
Counties won by Cornyn
Counties won by Hegar

2020 U.S. Senate election results by Texas county
County	Cornyn Republican		Hegar Democratic		McKennon Libertarian		Collins Green		Turullols-Bonilla (write-in) Independent		Margin		Total votes
County	Votes	%	Votes	%	Votes	%	Votes	%	Votes	%	Votes	%	Total votes
Anderson	14,943	78.35%	3,792	19.88%	249	1.31%	88	0.46%	0	0.00%	11,151	58.45%	19,072
Andrews	4,894	84.38%	779	13.43%	107	1.84%	20	0.34%	0	0.00%	4,115	70.95%	5,800
Angelina	24,962	72.66%	8,771	25.53%	461	1.34%	161	0.47%	0	0.00%	16,191	47.13%	34,355
Aransas	9,189	75.54%	2,729	22.44%	178	1.46%	68	0.56%	0	0.00%	6,460	53.10%	12,164
Archer	4,178	88.44%	467	9.89%	65	1.38%	14	0.30%	0	0.00%	3,711	78.55%	4,724
Armstrong	1,025	93.27%	64	5.82%	5	0.45%	5	0.45%	0	0.00%	961	87.45%	1,099
Atascosa	11,906	66.53%	5,588	31.22%	258	1.44%	142	0.79%	2	0.01%	6,318	35.31%	17,896
Austin	11,454	79.10%	2,752	19.00%	215	1.48%	57	0.39%	3	0.02%	8,702	60.10%	14,481
Bailey	1,400	76.84%	383	21.02%	28	1.54%	11	0.60%	0	0.00%	1,017	55.82%	1,822
Bandera	9,957	79.42%	2,291	18.27%	234	1.87%	55	0.44%	0	0.00%	7,666	61.15%	12,537
Bastrop	20,468	56.07%	15,071	41.28%	757	2.07%	208	0.57%	2	0.01%	5,397	14.79%	36,506
Baylor	1,462	87.13%	177	10.55%	30	1.79%	9	0.54%	0	0.00%	1,285	76.58%	1,678
Bee	5,713	63.09%	3,103	34.27%	171	1.89%	58	0.64%	10	0.11%	2,610	28.82%	9,055
Bell	68,934	54.36%	54,413	42.91%	2,725	2.15%	727	0.57%	5	0.00%	14,521	11.45%	126,804
Bexar	320,095	42.51%	411,328	54.63%	15,205	2.02%	6,307	0.84%	52	0.01%	-91,233	-12.12%	752,987
Blanco	5,457	73.66%	1,816	24.51%	105	1.42%	30	0.40%	0	0.00%	3,641	49.15%	7,408
Borden	390	94.89%	18	4.38%	1	0.24%	2	0.49%	0	0.00%	372	90.51%	411
Bosque	7,367	81.50%	1,490	16.48%	121	1.34%	60	0.66%	1	0.01%	5,877	65.02%	9,039
Bowie	26,908	70.94%	10,406	27.43%	474	1.25%	143	0.38%	0	0.00%	16,502	43.51%	37,931
Brazoria	90,705	59.14%	58,759	38.31%	3,019	1.97%	879	0.57%	5	0.00%	31,946	20.83%	153,367
Brazos	49,346	58.63%	32,098	38.14%	2,243	2.67%	462	0.55%	12	0.01%	17,248	20.49%	84,161
Brewster	2,453	51.40%	2,167	45.41%	113	2.37%	35	0.73%	4	0.08%	286	5.99%	4,772
Briscoe	625	87.41%	79	11.05%	6	0.84%	5	0.70%	0	0.00%	546	76.36%	715
Brooks	859	36.46%	1,425	60.48%	39	1.66%	33	1.40%	0	0.00%	-566	-24.02%	2,356
Brown	13,482	85.57%	1,965	12.47%	250	1.59%	58	0.37%	0	0.00%	11,517	73.10%	15,755
Burleson	6,596	77.70%	1,709	20.13%	142	1.67%	42	0.49%	0	0.00%	4,887	57.57%	8,489
Burnet	18,687	76.15%	5,323	21.69%	438	1.78%	92	0.37%	0	0.00%	13,364	54.46%	24,540
Caldwell	8,044	54.06%	6,449	43.34%	272	1.83%	103	0.69%	12	0.08%	1,595	10.72%	14,880
Calhoun	5,531	71.41%	2,092	27.01%	100	1.29%	22	0.28%	0	0.00%	3,439	44.40%	7,745
Callahan	5,892	87.69%	680	10.12%	106	1.58%	41	0.61%	0	0.00%	5,212	77.57%	6,719
Cameron	46,482	41.79%	61,508	55.30%	1,797	1.62%	1,433	1.29%	3	0.00%	-15,026	-13.51%	111,223
Camp	3,597	71.43%	1,359	26.99%	57	1.13%	22	0.44%	1	0.02%	2,238	44.44%	5,036
Carson	2,756	88.53%	286	9.19%	63	2.02%	5	0.16%	3	0.10%	2,470	79.34%	3,113
Cass	10,796	78.16%	2,672	19.34%	153	1.11%	192	1.39%	0	0.00%	8,124	58.82%	13,813
Castro	1,572	77.02%	432	21.17%	24	1.18%	13	0.64%	0	0.00%	1,140	55.85%	2,041
Chambers	17,037	79.79%	3,786	17.73%	419	1.96%	111	0.52%	0	0.00%	13,251	62.06%	21,353
Cherokee	14,945	77.31%	4,058	20.99%	269	1.39%	59	0.31	0	0.00%	10,887	56.32%	19,331
Childress	1,936	85.70%	283	12.53%	29	1.28%	11	0.49%	0	0.00%	1,653	73.17%	2,259
Clay	4,958	87.01%	632	11.09%	69	1.21%	27	0.47%	12	0.21%	4,326	75.92%	5,698
Cochran	765	78.22%	183	18.71%	22	2.25%	8	0.82%	0	0.00%	582	59.51%	978
Coke	1,557	88.77%	171	9.75%	23	1.31%	3	0.17%	0	0.00%	1,386	79.02%	1,754
Coleman	3,586	88.22%	426	10.48%	37	0.91%	16	0.39%	0	0.00%	3,160	77.74%	4,065
Collin	263,074	54.66%	207,005	43.01%	8,495	1.76%	2,721	0.57%	11	0.00%	56,069	11.65%	481,306
Collingsworth	1,032	86.58%	145	12.16%	10	0.84%	4	0.34%	1	0.08%	887	74.42%	1,192
Colorado	7,367	74.49%	2,362	23.88%	116	1.17%	43	0.43%	2	0.02%	5,005	50.61%	9,890
Comal	63,545	71.99%	22,552	25.55%	1,753	1.99%	418	0.47%	2	0.00%	40,993	46.44%	88,270
Comanche	5,053	84.16%	831	13.84%	90	1.50%	30	0.50%	0	0.00%	4,222	70.32%	6,004
Concho	1,029	82.52%	193	15.48%	20	1.60%	5	0.40%	0	0.00%	836	67.04%	1,247
Cooke	15,516	82.20%	2,999	15.89%	277	1.47%	85	0.45%	0	0.00%	12,517	66.31%	18,877
Coryell	15,372	66.12%	7,118	30.62%	609	2.62%	149	0.64%	1	0.00%	8,254	35.50%	23,249
Cottle	534	81.40%	110	16.77%	7	1.07%	5	0.76%	0	0.00%	424	64.63%	656
Crane	1,213	82.01%	229	15.48%	24	1.62%	13	0.88%	0	0.00%	984	66.53%	1,479
Crockett	1,146	76.76%	314	21.03%	21	1.41%	12	0.80%	0	0.00%	832	55.73%	1,493
Crosby	1,356	72.09%	486	25.84%	25	1.33%	14	0.74%	0	0.00%	870	46.25%	1,881
Culberson	367	47.17%	385	49.49%	19	2.44%	6	0.77%	1	0.13%	-18	-2.32%	778
Dallam	1,369	85.83%	200	12.54%	21	1.32%	5	0.31%	0	0.00%	1,169	73.29%	1,595
Dallas	330,851	36.13%	560,603	61.22%	15,905	1.74%	8,282	0.90%	20	0.00%	-229,752	-25.09%	915,661
Dawson	2,827	77.64%	738	20.27%	60	1.65%	14	0.38%	2	0.05%	2,089	57.37%	3,641
Deaf Smith	3,273	72.20%	1,151	25.39%	73	1.61%	36	0.79%	0	0.00%	2,122	46.81%	4,533
Delta	2,111	83.31%	370	14.60%	31	1.22%	22	0.87%	0	0.00%	1,741	68.71%	2,534
Denton	231,025	55.91%	170,984	41.38%	8,553	2.07%	2,627	0.64%	22	0.01%	60,041	14.53%	413,211
Dewitt	6,399	81.13%	1,384	17.55%	84	1.07%	20	0.25%	0	0.00%	5,015	63.58%	7,887
Dickens	808	84.34%	133	13.88%	13	1.36%	4	0.42%	0	0.00%	675	70.46%	958
Dimmit	1,274	36.74%	2,122	61.19%	39	1.12%	30	0.87%	3	0.09%	-848	-24.45%	3,468
Donley	1,418	87.26%	181	11.14%	22	1.35%	4	0.25%	0	0.00%	1,237	76.12%	1,625
Duval	1,787	40.44%	2,458	55.62%	97	2.20%	77	1.74%	0	0.00%	-671	-15.18%	4,419
Eastland	7,015	86.72%	910	11.25%	131	1.62%	31	0.38%	2	0.02%	6,105	75.47%	8,089
Ector	31,711	72.78%	10,682	24.52%	902	2.07%	277	0.64%	0	0.00%	21,029	48.26%	43,572
Edwards	824	83.57%	144	14.60%	14	1.42%	3	0.30%	1	0.10%	680	68.97%	986
El Paso	80,021	30.87%	164,931	63.62%	8,248	3.18%	6,036	2.33%	14	0.01%	-84,910	-32.75%	259,250
Ellis	57,078	67.12%	25,780	30.32%	1,589	1.87%	585	0.69%	7	0.01%	31,298	36.80%	85,039
Erath	13,564	81.18%	2,707	16.20%	335	2.01%	102	0.61%	0	0.00%	10,857	64.98%	16,708
Falls	4,157	68.84%	1,787	29.59%	76	1.26%	19	0.31%	0	0.00%	2,370	39.25%	6,039
Fannin	11,836	80.25%	2,559	17.35%	273	1.85%	80	0.54%	1	0.01%	9,277	62.90%	14,749
Fayette	10,056	78.17%	2,634	20.48%	129	1.00%	45	0.35%	0	0.00%	7,422	57.69%	12,864
Fisher	1,418	78.60%	351	19.46%	28	1.55%	7	0.39%	0	0.00%	1,067	59.14%	1,804
Floyd	1,554	78.09%	397	19.95%	29	1.46%	10	0.50%	0	0.00%	1,157	58.14%	1,990
Foard	404	77.84%	107	20.62%	7	1.35%	1	0.19%	0	0.00%	297	57.22%	519
Fort Bend	160,977	46.33%	178,984	51.52%	5,359	1.54%	2,112	0.61%	7	0.00%	-18,007	-5.19%	347,439
Franklin	4,114	83.25%	753	15.24%	63	1.27%	12	0.24%	0	0.00%	3,361	68.01%	4,942
Freestone	6,838	79.91%	1,553	18.15%	116	1.36%	50	0.58%	0	0.00%	5,285	61.76%	8,557
Frio	2,489	50.58%	2,283	46.39%	71	1.44%	78	1.59%	0	0.00%	206	4.19%	4,921
Gaines	5,118	88.85%	548	9.51%	76	1.32%	18	0.31%	0	0.00%	4,570	79.34%	5,760
Galveston	94,317	61.49%	55,094	35.92%	3,003	1.96%	969	0.63%	3	0.00%	39,223	25.57%	153,386
Garza	1,374	84.97%	225	13.91%	11	0.68%	7	0.43%	0	0.00%	1,149	71.06%	1,617
Gillespie	12,543	79.49%	2,996	18.99%	200	1.27%	39	0.25%	1	0.01%	9,547	60.50%	15,779
Glasscock	603	93.34%	35	5.42%	5	0.77%	3	0.46%	0	0.00%	568	87.92%	646
Goliad	3,000	76.75%	840	21.49%	43	1.10%	14	0.36%	12	0.31%	2,160	55.26%	3,909
Gonzales	5,617	74.59%	1,782	23.66%	89	1.18%	42	0.56%	1	0.01%	3,835	50.93%	7,531
Gray	6,705	87.21%	774	10.07%	167	2.17%	42	0.55%	0	0.00%	5,931	77.14%	7,688
Grayson	43,735	74.16%	13,938	23.63%	1,008	1.71%	293	0.50%	0	0.00%	29,797	50.53%	58,974
Gregg	32,467	68.37%	14,025	29.54%	787	1.66%	204	0.43%	1	0.00%	18,442	38.83%	47,484
Grimes	9,338	76.07%	2,678	21.82%	199	1.62%	60	0.49%	0	0.00%	6,660	54.25%	12,275
Guadalupe	48,308	62.75%	26,697	34.68%	1,545	2.01%	428	0.56%	3	0.00%	21,611	28.07%	76,981
Hale	6,999	74.65%	2,155	22.98%	155	1.65%	67	0.71%	0	0.00%	4,844	51.67%	9,376
Hall	967	84.82%	156	13.68%	7	0.61%	10	0.88%	0	0.00%	811	71.14%	1,140
Hamilton	3,574	83.23%	594	13.83%	63	1.47%	45	1.05%	18	0.42%	2,288	53.28%	4,294
Hansford	1,844	90.93%	158	7.79%	21	1.04%	5	0.25%	0	0.00%	1,686	83.14%	2,028
Hardeman	1,313	84.44%	232	14.92%	9	0.58%	1	0.06%	0	0.00%	1,081	69.52%	1,555
Hardin	23,516	85.87%	3,388	12.37%	393	1.44%	87	0.32%	0	0.00%	20,128	73.50%	27,384
Harris	718,228	44.49%	854,158	52.90%	29,217	1.81%	12,889	0.80%	33	0.00%	-135,930	-8.41%	1,614,525
Harrison	21,231	72.25%	7,612	25.91%	440	1.50%	101	0.34%	1	0.00%	13,619	46.34%	29,384
Hartley	1,859	89.72%	176	8.49%	27	1.30%	10	0.48%	0	0.00%	1,683	81.23%	2,072
Haskell	1,808	82.82%	347	15.90%	15	0.69%	13	0.60%	0	0.00%	1,461	66.92%	2,183
Hays	49,539	45.64%	55,597	51.22%	2,595	2.39%	814	0.75%	1	0.00%	-6,058	-5.58%	108,546
Hemphill	1,465	86.53%	197	11.64%	22	1.30%	9	0.53%	0	0.00%	1,268	74.89%	1,693
Henderson	28,717	79.56%	6,672	18.48%	526	1.46%	180	0.50%	1	0.00%	22,045	61.08%	36,096
Hidalgo	84,284	40.23%	116,962	55.83%	5,072	2.42%	3,119	1.49%	46	0.02%	-32,678	-15.60%	209,483
Hill	11,845	79.89%	2,688	18.13%	196	1.32%	98	0.66%	0	0.00%	9,157	61.76%	14,827
Hockley	6,449	80.73%	1,384	17.33%	124	1.55%	28	0.35%	3	0.04%	5,065	63.40%	7,988
Hood	26,253	81.58%	5,228	16.25%	509	1.58%	189	0.59%	2	0.01%	21,025	65.33%	32,181
Hopkins	12,497	79.87%	2,833	18.11%	236	1.51%	81	0.52%	0	0.00%	6,761	43.21%	15,647
Houston	6,984	74.82%	2,230	23.89%	92	0.99%	28	0.30%	0	0.00%	4,754	50.93%	9,334
Howard	7,854	78.14%	1,959	19.49%	193	1.92%	45	0.45%	0	0.00%	5,895	58.65%	10,051
Hudspeth	680	61.76%	383	34.79%	22	2.00%	15	1.36%	1	0.09%	297	26.97%	1,101
Hunt	28,888	75.91%	8,319	21.86%	628	1.65%	223	0.59%	0	0.00%	20,569	54.05%	38,058
Hutchinson	7,575	87.14%	900	10.35%	178	2.05%	36	0.41%	4	0.05%	6,675	76.79%	8,693
Irion	760	86.36%	111	12.61%	9	1.02%	0	0.41%	0	0.05%	649	73.75%	880
Jack	3,322	89.78%	319	8.62%	41	1.11%	17	0.46%	1	0.03%	3,003	81.16%	3,700
Jackson	5,167	81.90%	1,021	16.18%	81	1.28%	26	0.41%	14	0.22%	4,146	65.72%	6,309
Jasper	12,312	80.01%	2,851	18.53%	180	1.17%	42	0.27%	4	0.03%	9,461	61.48%	15,389
Jeff Davis	767	59.64%	483	37.56%	30	2.33%	6	0.47%	0	0.00%	284	22.08%	1,286
Jefferson	46,928	50.50%	44,112	47.47%	1,418	1.53%	464	0.50%	4	0.00%	2,816	3.03%	92,926
Jim Hogg	652	33.89%	1,136	61.61%	30	1.63%	26	1.41%	0	0.00%	-484	-27.72%	1,844
Jim Wells	6,957	52.47%	6,025	45.44%	170	1.28%	108	0.81%	0	0.00%	932	7.03%	13,260
Johnson	54,403	76.13%	15,474	21.65%	1,217	1.70%	369	0.52%	0	0.00%	38,929	54.48%	71,463
Jones	5,546	83.76%	967	14.61%	81	1.22%	27	0.41%	0	0.00%	4,579	69.15%	6,621
Karnes	3,833	75.32%	1,178	23.15%	58	1.14%	20	0.39%	0	0.00%	2,655	52.17%	5,089
Kaufman	37,649	66.67%	17,507	31.00%	961	1.70%	352	0.62%	2	0.00%	20,142	35.67%	56,471
Kendall	20,584	77.99%	5,335	20.21%	374	1.42%	99	0.38%	0	0.00%	15,249	57.78%	26,392
Kenedy	107	63.31%	57	33.73%	4	2.37%	1	0.59%	0	0.00%	50	29.58%	169
Kent	386	86.74%	53	11.91%	4	0.90%	2	0.45%	0	0.00%	333	74.83%	445
Kerr	21,022	76.32%	5,946	21.59%	446	1.62%	128	0.46%	1	0.00%	15,076	54.73%	27,543
Kimble	1,962	87.08%	254	11.27%	28	1.24%	9	0.40%	0	0.00%	1,708	75.81%	2,253
King	149	96.75%	5	3.25%	0	0.00%	0	0.00%	0	0.00%	144	93.50%	154
Kinney	1,070	70.95%	395	26.19%	25	1.58%	13	0.86%	5	0.33%	675	44.76%	1,508
Kleberg	5,374	50.19%	5,067	47.32%	183	1.71%	84	0.78%	0	0.00%	307	2.87%	10,708
Knox	1,147	80.15%	263	18.38%	15	1.05%	5	0.35%	1	0.07%	884	61.77%	1,431
Lamar	16,476	77.85%	4,295	20.29%	279	1.32%	101	0.48%	14	0.07%	12,181	57.56%	21,165
Lamb	3,469	79.38%	802	18.35%	75	1.72%	22	0.50%	2	0.05%	2,667	61.03%	4,370
Lampasas	8,102	78.43%	1,978	19.15%	189	1.83%	61	0.59%	0	0.07%	6,124	59.28%	10,330
La Salle	1,082	50.40%	1,005	46.81%	30	1.40%	29	1.35%	1	0.05%	77	3.59%	2,147
Lavaca	8,599	85.66%	1,305	13.00%	109	1.09%	23	0.23%	2	0.02%	7,294	72.66%	10,038
Lee	6,211	77.32%	1,689	21.03%	96	1.20%	36	0.45%	0	0.07%	4,522	56.29%	8,032
Leon	7,421	86.37%	1,028	11.96%	102	1.19%	41	0.48%	0	0.00%	6,393	74.41%	8,592
Liberty	22,743	78.40%	5,662	19.52%	477	1.64%	127	0.44%	0	0.00%	17,081	58.88%	29,009
Limestone	6,656	74.23%	2,112	23.55%	122	1.36%	77	0.86%	0	0.00%	4,544	50.68%	8,967
Lipscomb	1,181	89.20%	117	8.84%	25	1.89%	1	0.08%	0	0.00%	1,064	80.36%	1,324
Live Oak	4,122	82.75%	790	15.86%	55	1.10%	14	0.28%	0	0.00%	3,332	66.89%	4,981
Llano	10,047	79.76%	2,331	18.51%	171	1.36%	47	0.37%	0	0.00%	7,716	61.25%	12,596
Loving	58	89.23%	5	7.69%	2	3.08%	0	0.28%	0	0.00%	53	81.54%	65
Lubbock	79,459	66.49%	36,319	30.39%	3,018	2.53%	702	0.59%	6	0.01%	43,140	36.10%	119,504
Lynn	1,817	80.29%	411	18.16%	25	1.10%	10	0.44%	0	0.00%	1,406	62.13%	2,263
Madison	4,118	78.84%	1,030	19.72%	61	1.17%	14	0.27%	0	0.00%	3,088	59.12%	5,223
Marion	3,380	71.04%	1,276	26.82%	85	1.79%	17	0.36%	0	0.00%	2,104	44.22%	4,758
Martin	1,811	85.75%	263	12.45%	27	1.28%	11	0.52%	0	0.00%	1,548	73.30%	2,112
Mason	1,980	80.65%	443	18.04%	25	1.02%	7	0.29%	0	0.00%	1,537	62.61%	2,455
Matagorda	9,647	71.55%	3,551	26.34%	222	1.65%	62	0.46%	0	0.00%	6,096	45.21%	13,482
Maverick	5,708	39.95%	7,956	55.68%	269	1.88%	349	2.44%	7	0.05%	-2,248	-15.73%	14,289
McCulloch	2,843	83.99%	460	13.59%	63	1.86%	19	0.56%	0	0.00%	2,383	70.40%	3,385
McLennan	60,036	62.45%	33,439	34.79%	2,015	2.10%	636	0.66%	3	0.00%	26,597	27.66%	96,129
McMullen	454	90.80%	43	8.60%	2	0.40%	1	0.20%	0	0.00%	411	82.20%	500
Medina	15,594	70.21%	6,207	27.94%	313	1.41%	96	0.43%	2	0.01%	9,387	42.27%	22,212
Menard	797	79.70%	189	18.90%	10	1.00%	4	0.10%	0	0.00%	608	60.80%	1,000
Midland	45,733	78.14%	11,417	19.51%	1,162	1.99%	216	0.37%	0	0.00%	34,316	58.63%	58,528
Milam	7,759	75.10%	2,382	23.06%	136	1.32%	54	0.52%	0	0.00%	5,377	52.04%	10,331
Mills	2,196	88.30%	252	10.13%	30	1.21%	9	0.36%	0	0.00%	1,944	78.17%	2,487
Mitchell	2,129	83.82%	359	14.13%	40	1.57%	12	0.47%	0	0.00%	1,770	69.69%	2,540
Montague	8,526	87.37%	1,051	10.77%	135	1.38%	47	0.48%	0	0.00%	7,475	76.60%	9,759
Montgomery	194,528	72.36%	68,254	25.39%	4,844	1.80%	1,208	0.45%	4	0.00%	126,274	46.97%	268,838
Moore	4,314	79.20%	999	18.34%	102	1.87%	32	0.59%	0	0.00%	3,315	60.86%	5,447
Morris	3,753	68.47%	1,639	29.90%	66	1.20%	21	0.38%	2	0.04%	2,114	38.57%	5,481
Motley	591	92.63%	44	6.90%	3	0.47%	0	0.00%	0	0.00%	547	85.73%	638
Nacogdoches	17,370	65.55%	8,487	32.03%	476	1.80%	163	0.62%	3	0.01%	8,883	33.52%	26,499
Navarro	13,701	72.26%	4,821	25.42%	315	1.66%	125	0.66%	0	0.00%	8,880	46.84%	18,962
Newton	4,784	79.51%	1,163	19.33%	47	0.78%	23	0.38%	0	0.00%	3,621	60.18%	6,017
Nolan	4,102	77.67%	1,077	20.39%	84	1.59%	18	0.34%	0	0.00%	3,025	57.28%	5,281
Nueces	64,558	51.52%	57,180	45.63%	2,564	2.05%	997	0.80%	15	0.01%	7,378	5.89%	125,314
Ochiltree	2,783	89.60%	278	8.95%	36	1.16%	8	0.26%	1	0.03%	2,505	80.65%	3,106
Oldham	908	91.16%	74	7.43%	9	0.90%	5	0.50%	0	0.00%	834	83.73%	996
Orange	28,720	80.46%	6,249	17.51%	572	1.60%	140	0.39%	12	0.03%	22,471	62.95%	35,693
Palo Pinto	9,999	81.11%	2,028	16.45%	231	1.87%	70	0.57%	0	0.00%	7,971	64.66%	12,328
Panola	9,145	80.91%	2,015	17.83%	109	0.96%	30	0.27%	4	0.04%	7,130	63.08%	11,303
Parker	61,705	81.71%	11,919	15.78%	468	0.62%	5	0.01%	0	0.00%	49,786	65.93%	75,520
Parmer	2,132	81.16%	454	17.28%	28	1.07%	13	0.49%	0	0.00%	1,678	63.88%	2,627
Pecos	3,081	67.43%	1,376	30.12%	79	1.73%	32	0.70%	1	0.02%	1,705	37.31%	4,569
Polk	17,735	75.37%	5,237	22.26%	426	1.81%	133	0.57%	0	0.00%	12,498	53.11%	23,531
Potter	22,683	69.08%	9,168	27.92%	738	2.25%	247	0.75%	0	0.00%	13,515	41.16%	32,836
Presidio	651	31.13%	1,374	65.71%	29	1.39%	37	1.77%	0	0.00%	-723	-34.58%	2,091
Rains	5,060	85.00%	789	13.25%	81	1.36%	26	0.44%	0	0.00%	4,271	71.75%	5,956
Randall	51,116	79.47%	11,618	18.06%	1,348	2.10%	234	0.36%	6	0.01%	39,498	61.41%	64,322
Reagan	893	83.54%	154	14.41%	13	1.22%	9	0.84%	0	0.00%	739	69.13%	1,069
Real	1,626	83.86%	286	14.75%	19	0.98%	8	0.41%	0	0.00%	1,340	69.11%	1,939
Red River	4,452	77.67%	1,191	20.78%	58	1.01%	31	0.54%	0	0.00%	3,261	56.89%	5,732
Reeves	1,983	57.71%	1,337	38.91%	73	2.12%	43	1.25%	0	0.00%	646	18.80%	3,436
Refugio	2,073	65.33%	1,023	32.24%	52	1.64%	24	0.476	1	0.03%	1,050	33.09%	3,173
Roberts	526	96.51%	15	2.75%	4	0.73%	0	0.00%	0	0.00%	511	93.76%	545
Robertson	5,590	69.97%	2,244	28.09%	118	1.48%	36	0.45%	1	0.01%	3,346	41.88%	7,989
Rockwall	37,584	69.88%	15,009	27.91%	932	1.73%	257	0.48%	0	0.00%	22,575	41.97%	53,782
Runnels	3,722	86.00%	515	11.90%	66	1.52%	25	0.58%	0	0.00%	3,207	74.10%	4,328
Rusk	16,367	77.28%	4,455	21.03%	277	1.31%	78	0.37%	2	0.01%	11,912	56.25%	21,179
Sabine	4,678	86.04%	688	12.65%	46	0.85%	23	0.42%	2	0.04%	3,990	73.39%	5,437
San Augustine	2,898	74.75%	928	23.94%	39	1.01%	12	0.31%	0	0.00%	1,970	50.81%	3,877
San Jacinto	9,808	79.33%	2,268	18.35%	224	1.81%	63	0.51%	0	0.00%	7,540	60.98%	12,363
San Patricio	16,174	63.89%	8,484	33.51%	487	1.92%	161	0.64%	0	0.00%	7,690	30.38%	25,316
San Saba	2,218	88.72%	270	10.80%	9	0.36%	3	0.12%	0	0.00%	1,948	77.92%	2,500
Schleicher	927	81.89%	191	16.87%	10	0.88%	4	0.35%	0	0.00%	736	65.02%	1,132
Scurry	4,870	84.01%	805	13.89%	89	1.54%	32	0.55%	1	0.02%	4,065	70.12%	5,797
Shackelford	1,475	91.79%	115	7.16%	14	0.87%	3	0.19%	0	0.00%	1,360	84.63%	1,607
Shelby	7,868	78.74%	2,022	20.24%	75	0.75%	27	0.27%	0	0.00%	5,846	58.50%	9,992
Sherman	889	90.07%	88	8.92%	7	0.71%	2	0.20%	1	0.10%	801	81.15%	987
Smith	69,574	69.65%	28,385	28.42%	1,484	1.49%	443	0.44%	1	0.00%	41,189	41.23%	99,887
Somervell	4,103	83.37%	712	14.47%	78	1.59%	27	0.55%	1	0.02%	3,391	68.90%	4,921
Starr	5,845	39.62%	8,161	55.33%	357	2.42%	387	2.62%	1	0.01%	-2,316	-15.71%	14,751
Stephens	3,312	88.67%	374	10.01%	32	0.86%	17	0.46%	0	0.00%	2,938	78.66%	3,735
Sterling	567	91.30%	47	7.55%	2	0.32%	5	0.81%	0	0.00%	520	83.75%	621
Stonewall	586	82.07%	122	17.09%	3	0.42%	3	0.42%	0	0.00%	464	64.98%	714
Sutton	1,204	78.74%	305	19.95%	10	0.65%	10	0.65%	0	0.00%	899	58.79%	1,529
Swisher	1,795	77.40%	464	20.01%	44	1.90%	15	0.65%	1	0.04%	1,331	57.39%	2,319
Tarrant	423,117	51.09%	382,408	46.18%	16,443	1.99%	6,130	0.74%	18	0.00%	40,709	4.91%	828,116
Taylor	39,887	73.21%	13,704	25.15%	1,209	2.22%	309	0.57%	4	0.01%	26,183	48.06%	54,483
Terrell	324	72.00%	116	25.78%	5	1.11%	3	0.67%	2	0.44%	208	46.22%	450
Terry	2,731	77.50%	714	20.26%	63	1.79%	16	0.45%	0	0.00%	2,017	57.24%	3,524
Throckmorton	788	90.16%	76	8.70%	7	0.80%	3	0.34%	0	0.00%	712	81.46%	874
Titus	7,426	71.57%	2,748	26.48%	152	1.46%	50	0.48%	0	0.00%	4,678	45.09%	10,376
Tom Green	32,340	72.15%	11,371	25.37%	876	1.95%	234	0.52%	2	0.00%	20,969	46.78%	44,823
Travis	175,860	29.28%	408,528	68.02%	12,006	2.00%	4,191	0.70%	24	0.00%	-232,668	-38.74%	600,609
Trinity	5,445	79.93%	1,258	18.47%	79	1.16%	30	0.44%	0	0.00%	4,187	61.46%	6,812
Tyler	7,916	83.13%	1,400	14.70%	154	1.62%	53	0.56%	0	0.00%	6,516	68.43%	9,523
Upshur	15,470	82.94%	2,804	15.03%	320	1.72%	55	0.29%	4	0.02%	12,666	67.91%	18,653
Upton	1,147	85.85%	160	11.98%	18	1.35%	11	0.82%	0	0.00%	987	73.87%	1,336
Uvalde	5,968	59.19%	3,821	37.90%	192	1.90%	99	0.98%	2	0.02%	2,147	21.29%	10,082
Val Verde	8,103	54.14%	6,430	42.96%	252	1.68%	170	1.14%	13	0.09%	1,673	11.18%	14,968
Van Zandt	22,010	85.37%	3,374	13.09%	282	1.09%	107	0.42%	9	0.03%	18,636	72.28%	25,782
Victoria	23,144	68.69%	9,834	29.19%	524	1.56%	172	0.51%	18	0.05%	13,310	39.50%	33,692
Walker	15,480	65.94%	7,414	31.58%	449	1.91%	133	0.57%	1	0.00%	8,066	34.36%	23,477
Waller	14,219	63.31%	7,725	34.40%	394	1.75%	120	0.53%	0	0.00%	6,494	28.91%	22,458
Ward	3,138	79.62%	725	18.40%	61	1.55%	16	0.41%	1	0.03%	2,413	61.22%	3,941
Washington	12,988	75.16%	4,017	23.25%	223	1.29%	51	0.30%	1	0.01%	8,971	51.91%	17,280
Webb	23,153	34.87%	40,822	61.49%	1,246	1.88%	1,103	1.66%	69	0.10%	-17,669	-26.62%	66,393
Wharton	11,832	71.19%	4,513	27.15%	204	1.23%	70	0.42%	2	0.01%	7,319	44.04%	16,621
Wheeler	2,079	91.14%	165	7.23%	26	1.14%	11	0.48%	0	0.00%	1,914	83.91%	2,281
Wichita	31,626	69.84%	12,399	27.38%	997	2.20%	259	0.57%	0	0.00%	19,227	42.46%	45,281
Wilbarger	3,473	78.59%	874	19.78%	54	1.22%	18	0.41%	0	0.00%	2,599	58.81%	4,419
Willacy	2,183	41.27%	2,968	56.12%	85	1.61%	53	1.00%	0	0.00%	-785	-14.85%	5,289
Williamson	142,391	50.17%	133,783	47.14%	6,123	2.16%	1,492	0.53%	18	0.01%	8,608	3.03%	283,807
Wilson	18,327	74.21%	5,943	24.06%	309	1.25%	118	0.48%	0	0.00%	12,384	50.15%	24,697
Winkler	1,714	81.77%	338	16.13%	30	1.43%	12	0.57%	2	0.10%	1,376	65.64%	2,096
Wise	26,630	83.22%	4,644	14.51%	563	1.76%	162	0.51%	0	0.00%	21,986	68.71%	31,999
Wood	18,757	83.48%	3,318	14.77%	306	1.36%	87	0.39%	2	0.01%	15,439	68.71%	22,470
Yoakum	2,153	82.84%	387	14.89%	38	1.46%	21	0.81%	0	0.00%	1,766	67.95%	2,599
Young	6,996	86.27%	967	11.93%	120	1.48%	26	0.32%	0	0.00%	6,029	74.34%	8,109
Zapata	1,454	43.06%	1,821	53.92%	52	1.54%	50	1.48%	0	0.00%	-367	-10.86%	3,377
Zavala	1,232	30.85%	2,633	65.92%	72	1.80%	57	1.43%	0	0.00%	-1,401	-35.07%	3,994
Total	5,962,983	53.51%	4,889,384	43.87%	209,722	1.88%	81,893	0.73%	678	0.01%	1,073,599	9.64%	11,144,660
	Cornyn Republican		Hegar Democratic		McKennon Libertarian		Collins Green		Turullols-Bonilla (write-in) Independent		Margin		Total votes

Counties that flipped from Democratic to Republican

- Frio (largest municipality: Pearsall)
- Jim Wells (largest municipality: Alice)

Counties that flipped from Republican to Democratic

- Bexar (largest municipality: San Antonio)
- Culberson (largest municipality: Van Horn)
- Fort Bend (largest municipality: Sugar Land)
- Harris (largest municipality: Houston)
- Hays (largest municipality: San Marcos)

==== By congressional district ====
Cornyn won 24 out of 36 congressional districts, including one that elected a Democrat.

District	Cornyn	Hegar	Representative
1st	72%	26%	Louie Gohmert
2nd	52%	46%	Dan Crenshaw
3rd	53%	45%	Van Taylor
4th	75%	23%	Vacant
4th	75%	23%	Pat Fallon
5th	62%	36%	Lance Gooden
6th	52%	45%	Ron Wright
7th	48.6%	49.2%	Lizzie Fletcher
8th	72%	26%	Kevin Brady
9th	24%	73%	Al Green
10th	52%	46%	Michael McCaul
11th	79%	19%	Mike Conaway
11th	79%	19%	August Pfluger
12th	62%	35%	Kay Granger
13th	79%	18%	Mac Thornberry
13th	79%	18%	Ronny Jackson
14th	60%	38%	Randy Weber
15th	49%	48%	Vicente Gonzalez
16th	31%	63%	Veronica Escobar
17th	56%	41%	Bill Flores
17th	56%	41%	Pete Sessions
18th	24%	73%	Sheila Jackson Lee
19th	73%	24%	Jodey Arrington
20th	37%	60%	Joaquín Castro
21st	53%	44%	Chip Roy
22nd	52%	46%	Pete Olson
22nd	52%	46%	Troy Nehls
23rd	51%	46%	Will Hurd
23rd	51%	46%	Tony Gonzales
24th	50%	48%	Kenny Marchant
24th	50%	48%	Beth Van Duyne
25th	56%	42%	Roger Williams
26th	59%	39%	Michael Burgess
27th	62%	36%	Michael Cloud
28th	46%	51%	Henry Cuellar
29th	33%	64%	Sylvia Garcia
30th	20%	77%	Eddie Bernice Johnson
31st	52%	45%	John Carter
32nd	48%	50%	Colin Allred
33rd	26%	70%	Marc Veasey
34th	46%	51%	Filemon Vela Jr.
35th	32%	65%	Lloyd Doggett
36th	72%	26%	Brian Babin

== See also ==
- 2020 Texas elections

== Notes ==
Partisan clients

Additional candidates and voter samples
