= Armando Valladares =

American diplomat and former Cuban prisoner

- Born: Armando Valladares Pérez; May 30, 1937 (age 89)
- Occupations: Poet; Diplomat; Activist
- Known for: Imprisonment of 22 years by Cuban government
- Title: United States Ambassador to the United Nations Commission on Human Rights (1988-1990)

Armando Valladares Perez (born May 30, 1937) is a Cuban-American poet, diplomat and former political prisoner for his involvement in the Cuban dissident movement.

In 1960, he was arrested by the Cuban government for opposing Fidel Castro, after having initially supported him. As a result Amnesty International named him a prisoner of conscience.

Following his release in 1982, he wrote a book detailing his imprisonment and torture at the hands of the Cuban government, and was appointed in 1987 by U.S. President Ronald Reagan to serve as the United States Ambassador to the United Nations Commission on Human Rights.

== Arrest and imprisonment ==
Valladares is from Pinar del Río, Cuba. By his own account, he was initially a supporter of Fidel Castro's Cuban Revolution, later becoming an employee of the Office of the Ministry of Communications for the Revolutionary Government, for which he worked at a post office. In 1960, at the age of 23, he refused to put an "I'm with Fidel" sign on his desk at work and was subsequently given a thirty-year prison sentence, according to his own report.

The Cuban government stated that he was convicted for acts of terrorism, and claimed that he had previously worked for the secret police of Fulgencio Batista's dictatorship. This was in years that Cuba was the target of the US covert Operation Mongoose.

The international human rights organizations Oslo Freedom Forum, PEN International, and Amnesty International, in contrast, stated their belief that Valladares had been imprisoned solely for his anti-Castro stance, and the latter organization named him a prisoner of conscience.

Valladares states that he was offered "political rehabilitation" early in his prison term, but refused. According to Valladares, this led to imprisonment in cramped "drawer cells" in which multiple prisoners were confined in a space too small to lie down, without being allowed toilet access. The Cuban government decided in 1982 that Valladares would be released and could leave the country, on condition that he got on and off the plane at his own feet and in the sight of everyone, which he was able to do.

In 1987, Reagan drafted a UN resolution accusing Cuba of human rights abuses based on Valladares claims of "140,000 political prisoners being tortured and executed in Cuban prisons and concentration camps."

== Writing and release ==
During his time in prison, Valladares went on multiple hunger strikes. The longest, a 49-day hunger strike in 1974, left him using a wheelchair several years with an attack of polyneuritis. Valladares subsequently appealed to the Inter-American Commission on Human Rights of the Organization of American States, stating that he was being denied important medical care, including a functioning wheelchair. The IACHR found that Cuba had violated a number of Valladares's rights, including the right to a fair trial, the right to protection against arbitrary arrest and the right to humane treatment during the time the individual is in custody, and the right to due process and protection from cruel, infamous, or unusual punishment.

Believing that "poetry is a weapon," Valladares also began smuggling his poems out of jail, which brought him a measure of international attention. His first published collection, From My Wheelchair, detailed prison abuses and was released in 1974. After the book's publication, PEN France awarded him its Freedom Prize.

In 1981, Valladares's wife Marta – who had met and married him while he was imprisoned – traveled to Europe to meet with government officials regarding her husband's case, and in 1982, 83 U.S. Congressmen joined a call for Valladares's release. Valladares was released that year after 22 years' imprisonment after a direct appeal by French President François Mitterrand.

== Against All Hope and ambassadorship ==
After his release, Valladares resettled in the U.S. In 1986, Alfred A. Knopf released Valladares's memoir Against All Hope, in which he detailed his prison experiences. One year later, U.S. President Ronald Reagan appointed Valladares to serve as the United States Ambassador to the United Nations Commission on Human Rights. The move was widely seen as an attempt to dramatize and draw new attention to pervasive human rights abuses aimed at the Cuban dissident movement. The Cuban government reacted by calling Valladares a "traitor and a fake," including stating that he had faked his paralysis while imprisoned. The U.S. State Department responded by accusing Cuba of "mounting a massive defamation campaign against Armando Valladares" to deflect attention from its human rights record. In 1985, he signed a petition expressing support for the anti-Sandinista paramilitary Contras during the Nicaraguan Civil War.

Valladares served as the ambassador from 1988 to 1990. He vigorously argued for UN attention to Cuban human rights abuses during his tenure, leading Human Rights Watch to criticize him for appearing to have "little interest in pursuing other violators, particularly of the non-Communist sort," such as US allies Iraq or Guatemala.

== Other activities ==
Valladares is a member of the international advisory council of the Victims of Communism Memorial Foundation.

== Books ==
- Desde mi Silla de Ruedas (1976)
- El Corazon Con Que Vivo (1980) - a book of poetry in Spanish
- Cavernas del Silencio (1983)
- Against All Hope: A Memoir of Life in Castro's Gulag (1985) - an autobiographical work
- El Alma de un Poeta (1988)
