= Keith Harper (lawyer) =

Lawyer, ambassador

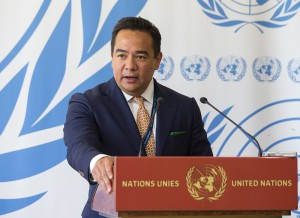

United States Ambassador to the United Nations Human Rights Council
- In office June 5, 2014 – January 20, 2017
- President: Barack Obama
- Preceded by: Eileen Donahoe
- Succeeded by: Michèle Taylor (2022)

Personal details
- Born: Keith Michael Harper; 1965 (age 60–61) Washington, D.C., U.S.
- Party: Democratic
- Education: University of California, Berkeley (BA); New York University (JD)

Keith Michael Harper (born 1965) is an American attorney and diplomat who was the first Native American to ever receive the rank of a U.S. ambassador to the United Nations Human Rights Council. He is a member of the Cherokee Nation of Oklahoma and as a lawyer he is known for working on behalf of Native Americans. He was, from June 2014 to January 2017, the U.S. representative to the United Nations Human Rights Council in Geneva.

== Early life and education ==
Although a member of the Cherokee Nation of Oklahoma, Harper did not grow up in Oklahoma, due to his father being in the military and posted elsewhere. Harper's forebears include David Rowe, an Assistant Principal Chief of the Cherokee Nation who was elected as a judge of the Northern Judicial Circuit shortly after the Civil War.

Harper attended the University of California, Berkeley, where he graduated in 1990 with a B.A. in sociology and psychology. He then went to the New York University School of Law, where he graduated with a J.D. in the class of 1993. There he served as an editor on the New York University Journal of International Law and Politics. He was admitted to the New York bar the following year.

== Legal career ==
After law school, Harper served as a law clerk to Judge Lawrence W. Pierce of the United States Court of Appeals for the Second Circuit. He considered it a formative experience with Pierce becoming one of his role models. He also worked early in his career for the New York firm of Davis, Polk & Wardwell.

Harper was a litigator at the Native American Rights Fund for eleven years spanning from 1995 to 2006. He is most known for his work in the Cobell v. Kempthorne, a large class-action lawsuit brought by Native American representatives against two departments of the United States government. The case was brought in 1996 on behalf of upwards of 500,000 Native Americans, and was resolved in 2009 with the Obama administration agreeing to a $3.4 billion settlement.

He also did some teaching: as an adjunct professor at the Catholic University of America Columbus School of Law from 1998 to 2001, and as a professorial lecturer at the American University Washington College of Law from 1999 to 2001.

He then became a partner at Kilpatrick Townsend & Stockton, in Washington, D.C., where he focused his practice on litigation and Native American affairs, representing tribes and individual Indians.

With the new firm, Harper continued his work as a lead attorney on Cobell, and by the 2010s the lawyers on that case had earned over $85 million in attorneys' fees. The high payments became an issue among some Native Americans, and during 2010–2011 Harper toured Indian country to defend the settlement terms and the payments to attorneys. Harper was also accused by some other Native American lawyers of using physical intimidation tactics in several cases in the mid-late 2000s during disagreements over Cobell matters.

Harper has also served on the bench: as a justice of the Mashantucket Pequot Tribe's Appellate Court from 2001 to 2007, and following that as a justice of the Supreme Court of the Poarch Band of Creek Indians from 2007 to 2008.

== Political involvement ==
Harper acted as a key liaison between the Barack Obama presidential campaign, 2008, and Indian tribes. In 2010, Harper was mentioned as a possible pick for the United States Court of Appeals for the Tenth Circuit. In 2011, President Obama named him to a spot on the President's Commission on White House Fellowships. Harper worked on the re-election Barack Obama presidential campaign, 2012, and helped bring in over $500,000 in donations. He personally helped host a conference and two major fundraisers for the campaign. As such, Harper was considered a "mega-bundler" who played a major role in setting overall record levels of campaign donations for Obama from Native Americans.

On July 11, 2017, Harper endorsed Deb Haaland for Congress. Haaland ran in New Mexico's first congressional district and won, becoming one of the two first Native American woman elected to Congress, alongside Sharice Davids.

== U.S. Ambassador ==
Harper was nominated by President Obama for the position of United States Ambassador to the United Nations Human Rights Council on June 10, 2013. Many human rights advocates were unfamiliar with Harper, and as such the pick reflected a long-standing practice of presidents rewarding top supporters with ambassadorships and similar postings. The Senate Foreign Relations Committee considered his nomination in two rounds of confirmation hearings, in September 2013 and February 2014.

A number of Republicans objected to the nomination, either because of his earnings or tactics during the Cobell case or because of his role in Obama campaign fundraising. Senator John McCain of Arizona, who led the arguments against Harper, said, "Mr. Harper is just another example of a campaign bundler wholly ill-suited to serve in the diplomatic post for which he's been nominated." Senator Jon Tester of Montana said, on the other hand, that "As a longtime advocate for the civil rights of Native Americans, Keith will be a great Ambassador for our country." While many Native American groups supported Harper's nomination, some indigenous rights advocates were wary of it, saying that Harper had shown a lack of substantial positions on Indian human rights issues throughout his legal career.

Eventually, Harper was confirmed by the United States Senate on June 3, 2014, nearly a year after his nomination, in a party-line 52–42 vote with Democrats supporting and Republicans opposed. As such he benefited from the "nuclear option" adopted in the Senate the year before, where Senate filibusters could no longer be used against such appointees. Harper thus became the first person from a federally recognized Native American tribe to achieve the rank of U.S. ambassador to the United Nations Human Rights Council.

Harper was sworn into his position by June 5, 2014, and immediately flew to Geneva for a Human Rights Council meeting.

Harper's tenure in the position ended with the change of administrations in Washington in January 2017.

== Return to law practice ==
In February 2017, Harper returned to practice as a partner at Kilpatrick Townsend & Stockton, in Washington, D.C., on Native American affairs and international matters. Jenner & Block hired Harper in July 2020.

== Awards and honors ==
- The National Law Journal selected Harper as one of 50 "Most Influential Minority Lawyers in America" in May 2008.
- He is listed in the 2013 and the four years immediately preceding editions of Chambers USA: America's Leading Lawyers for Business.
- Harper was recognized in The Best Lawyers in America for Native American Law in 2013 and the five years immediately preceding.
- He is listed as a 2010, 2012 and 2013 Washington, D.C., "Super Lawyer" in Native American Law by Super Lawyers magazine.
- Diversity & The Bar magazine selected Harper as one of 14 minority "Rainmakers".
- In 2001, he was selected as a Leadership Conference on Civil Rights delegate to the World Conference Against Racism in Durban, South Africa.

== See also ==
- List of Native American jurists

Diplomatic posts
Preceded by Eileen Donahoe	United States Ambassador to the United Nations Human Rights Council; 2014–2017	Succeeded by Theodore Allegra; Chargé d'Affaires a.i
