= Michèle Taylor =

American diplomat

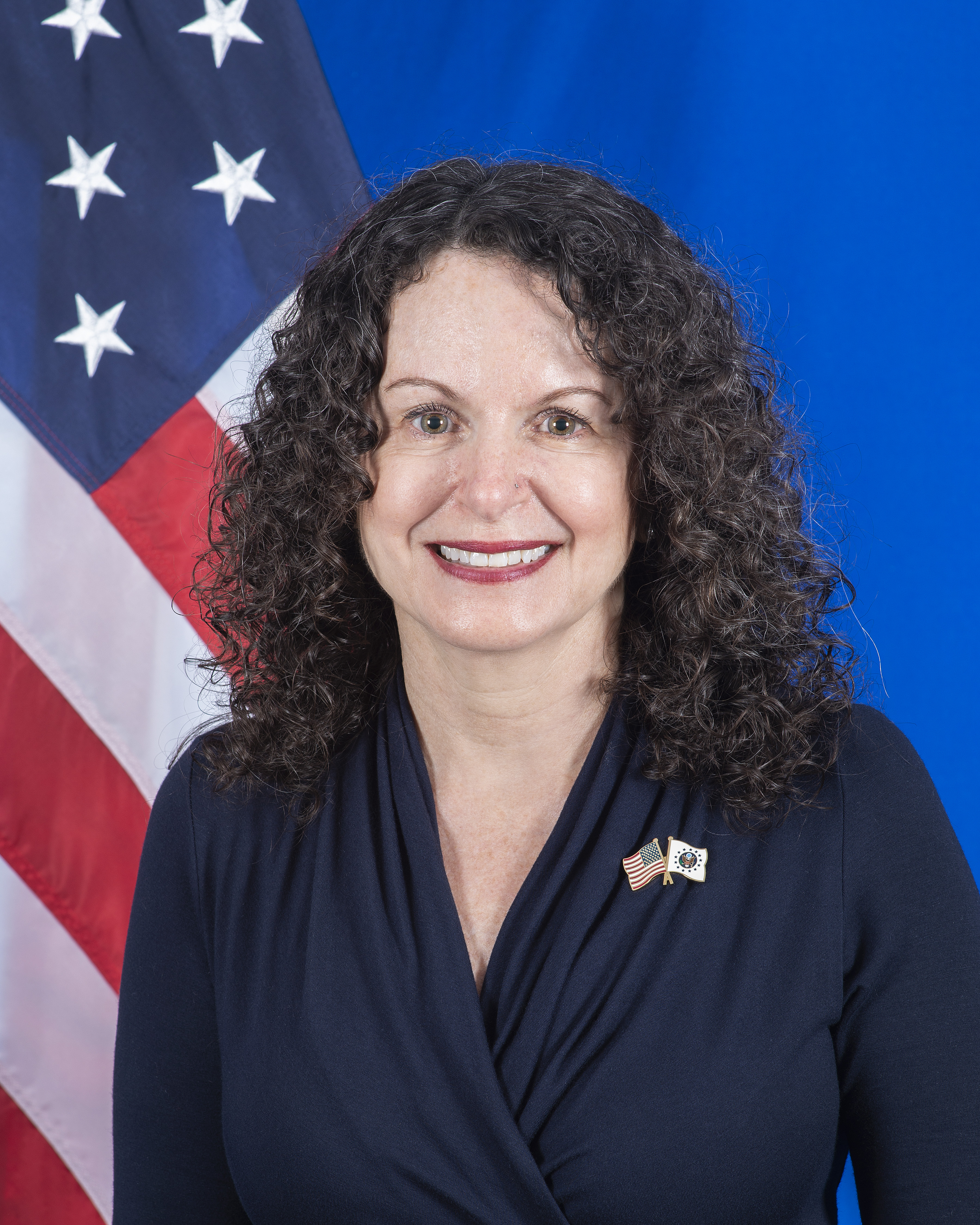

United States Ambassador to the United Nations Human Rights Council
- In office February 22, 2022 – January 20, 2025
- President: Joe Biden
- Preceded by: Keith Harper (2017)
- Succeeded by: TBD

Personal details
- Born: Palo Alto, California, U.S.
- Spouse: Kenneth Taylor
- Children: Two
- Education: Mills College (BA); Boston University (MA)

Michèle Taylor is an American diplomat who served as the United States ambassador to the United Nations Human Rights Council from 2022 to 2025. She previously served as a board member of the National Center for Civil and Human Rights and was a founding board member and vice chair of President Joe Biden’s Super PAC, Unite The Country. Ambassador Taylor currently serves as a Distinguished Professor of the Practice in the Sam Nunn School of International Affairs at the Georgia Institute of Technology.

== Early life and education ==
Taylor was born in Palo Alto, California. She earned a Bachelor of Arts degree from Mills College and Master of Arts in mathematics from Boston University.

== Career ==
=== Political involvement ===
In 2012, Taylor joined the Democratic National Committee. She served as vice chair of the National Finance Committee until 2016. Taylor co-founded and served as vice chair of the pro-Biden Super PAC, Unite The Country. Following the general election in November 2020, Taylor founded and worked as chair/CEO of Battleground Georgia.

In 2014, she was appointed to the United States Holocaust Memorial Council by then-president Barack Obama, where she served on committees addressing antisemitism, Holocaust denial, and global genocide and atrocity prevention. In the same year, Taylor was invited to serve as a consultant to the White House on the Violence Against Women Act’s 20th anniversary. Additionally, she joined the Anti-Defamation League’s Southeastern board, a role she held until 2017.

In 2018, she and her husband chaired the Center’s Power to Inspire event where Joe Biden was honored and served as the keynote speaker.

=== Diplomatic career ===
On October 21, 2021, President Joe Biden nominated Taylor to be the US Ambassador to the UN Human Rights Council. Hearings on her nomination were held before the Senate Foreign Relations Committee on December 14, 2021. The committee reported her nomination favorably on January 12, 2022. On February 17, 2022, the U.S. Senate confirmed Taylor by voice vote. She assumed office on February 22, 2022.

=== Community involvement ===
Taylor has held leadership positions for human rights organizations such as the Anti-Defamation League, Battleground Georgia, the Georgia Network to End Sexual Assault, and the Atlanta chapter of the Electing Women Alliance, which she co-founded alongside Jina Sinone, Pinney Allen, Nancy Koziol, and Sonya Halpern.

She is part of the Leadership Atlanta alumni class of 2018.

Taylor has been a board member, a course director, and a lead instructor with North Carolina’s Outward Bound program since 2004.

She serves as a board member, governance chair, and the guest programming co-chair of the Atlanta Jewish Film Society, which hosts the Atlanta Jewish Film Festival where she has introduced films.

Since 2010, Taylor has served as the treasurer of the Atlanta Midtown Improvement District board. She was appointed by Mayors Kasim Reed and Keisha Lance Bottoms to the role.

Taylor has served in several leadership roles with the board of the National Center for Civil and Human Rights.

== Personal life ==
Taylor's mother Hanne Susi Trnka and Taylor's grandparents were Holocaust survivors. Her mother was 3 years old during Kristallnacht in Vienna, but the family escaped harm due to a tip that the Nazis were looking for her grandfather. The family immigrated to America in 1939.

Taylor is Jewish and lives in Atlanta with her husband, Kenneth Taylor. They have two children. Taylor is also a part-time resident of Steamboat Springs, Colorado.
