= Transatlantic Commission on Election Integrity =

- Abbreviation: TCEI
- Formation: 2018
- Headquarters: Copenhagen, Denmark and Washington, D.C.
- Chair: Anders Fogh Rasmussen, Michael Chertoff

The Transatlantic Commission on Election Integrity is a bi-partisan initiative by leading figures in politics, tech, media and business from Europe and the US with the aim of addressing the question of foreign interference in elections.

== Foundation ==
On the sidelines of the Copenhagen Democracy Summit on June 21, 2018, Anders Fogh Rasmussen, founder of Alliance of Democracies and Michael Chertoff, a former secretary of homeland security in America, launched the Transatlantic Commission on Election Integrity, which has Joe Biden, Nick Clegg, Toomas Ilves, and Felipe Calderón among its members. The commission is tasked with bolstering the defences of Western democracies against outside interference.

The Transatlantic Commission on Election Integrity is Transatlantic and bipartisan in nature. It seeks to share lessons learned between decision-makers and institutions in Europe and the US, raise public awareness about the risks of interference while working to develop new models and technologies to empower civil society and governments to defend democracy.

== Stated goals ==
The Commission aims that over the next 20 elections to be held across EU and NATO countries between 2018 and the next American presidential contest in November 2020, they would advance a more collective approach to tackling election interference.

The Commission attempts to bridge three critical gaps it has identified as having thus far prevented the West from effectively addressing the challenge: a transatlantic gap; a partisan gap; and the gap between the tech community and the rest of society.

According to Politico, the commission also launched at the Munich Security Conference, an open call by 14 current and former political leaders for those running in the EU election to sign a pledge in which they promise to adhere to certain principles to counter foreign meddling. The call is for candidates not to spread data or materials for disinformation or propaganda purposes

== Founding members ==
Co-chairs:

- Anders Fogh Rasmussen, NATO Secretary General (2009-2014), Founder, Alliance of Democracies Foundation, Rasmussen Global
- Michael Chertoff, United States Secretary of Homeland Security (2005-2009)

Members:

- Joe Biden, Vice President of the United States (2009-2017)
- Felipe Calderon, President of Mexico (2006-2012)
- Eileen Donahoe, Executive Director, Global Digital Policy Incubator, Stanford Centre for Democracy, Development and the Rule of Law
- Toomas Ilves, President of Estonia (2006-2016)
- Natalie Jaresko, Executive Director of the Financial Oversight and Management Board for Puerto Rico, Finance Minister of Ukraine (2014-2016)
- Tanit Koch, Editor-in-Chief of Bild Magazine (2016-2018)
- Jeanne Meserve, Anchor and correspondent at ABC news and CNN (1984-2011), Senior Fellow at the George Washington University Center for Cyber and Homeland Security (2011-2017)
- Victor Pinchuk, Ukrainian businessman and philanthropist, founder of the Victor Pinchuk Foundation
- Marietje Schaake, Member of the European Parliament for D66 (ALDE), Vice-President of the European Parliament delegation to the US
- Joanna Shields, Baroness Shields, CEO BenevolentAI and former Under Secretary of State and Minister for Internet Safety and Security, United Kingdom
- John Negroponte, United States Deputy Secretary of State (2007-2009), Director of National Intelligence (2005-2007)
