= List of ambassadors of the United States to the United Nations Human Rights Council =

Ambassador of the United States to the United Nations Human Rights Council
- Seal of the United States Department of State

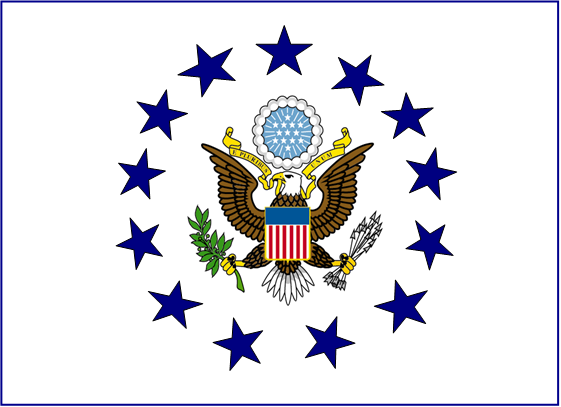
- Flag of a United States chief of mission
- Incumbent; Vacant since January 20, 2025
- United States Department of State
- Nominator: President of the United States
- Inaugural holder: Eleanor Roosevelt as Representative
- Formation: 1947
- Abolished: 2025
- Website: U.S. Delegation - Human Rights Council

The United States ambassador to the United Nations Human Rights Council is the diplomatic representative of the United States to the United Nations Human Rights Council. The position is located within the United States Mission to the United Nations and Other International Organizations located at Geneva, Switzerland. A formal title for the position is United States representative to the United Nations Human Rights Council, with rank of Ambassador.

Up until 2006, the position was commonly known as the United States ambassador to the United Nations Commission on Human Rights, as it was associated to a predecessor organization, the United Nations Commission on Human Rights. It was more formally called United States representative to the United Nations Commission on Human Rights, and did not at first have ambassadorial rank but subsequently attained it.

== History ==
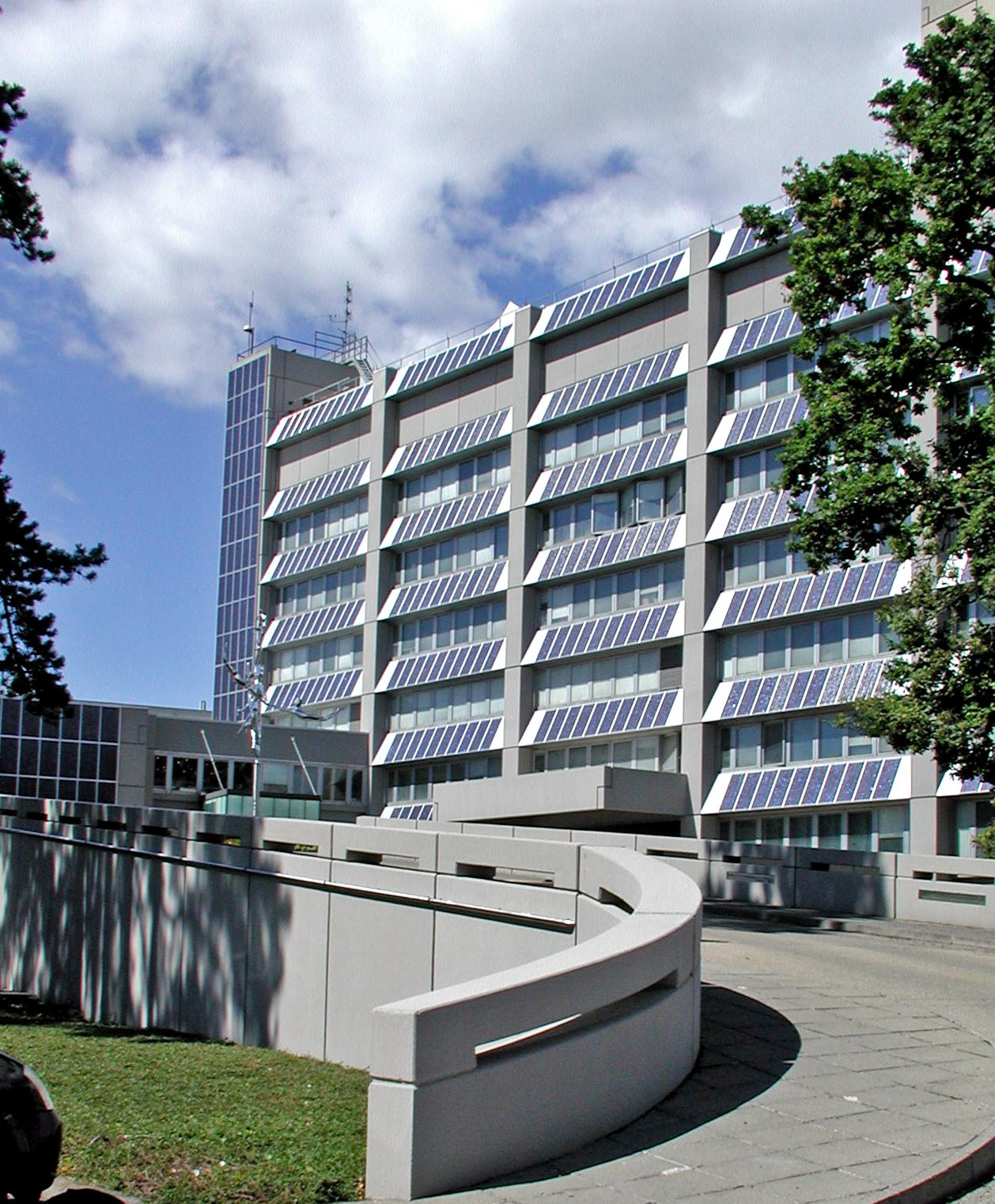
The United States Mission to the United Nations and Other International Organizations in Geneva

The U.S. delegation to the Human Rights Council is a part of the U.S. Mission Geneva, and other U.S. ambassadors stationed in Geneva are the United States ambassador to United Nations and Other International Organizations in Geneva (head of the overall mission, and not to be confused with the more well-known United States ambassador to the United Nations stationed in New York), the United States ambassador to the World Trade Organization, and the United States ambassador to the Conference on Disarmament.

The United Nations Commission on Human Rights was formed in April 1946 on a preliminary basis and then in January 1947 on a permanent basis. Former First Lady of the United States Eleanor Roosevelt was chosen as its first chair on both occasions. She played a major role in the formation and 1948 adoption of the Universal Declaration of Human Rights. She also served as the U.S. representative to the commission. In 1951 she relinquished the chair but stayed on as the U.S. representative to it.

As with regular ambassadorial posts, nominations are made by the President of the United States and confirmation by the United States Senate is required. Commentary on people holding the post has often been linked with perceptions that the Commission on Human Rights was anti-U.S. and especially anti-Israel. The United States was voted off the commission for a period beginning in 2001. Later, the United States withdrew from the council in 2018, rejoined it in 2021, and withdrew again in 2025.

Besides Eleanor Roosevelt, the position has attracted some well-known Americans, including four past members of the United States Congress, one of whom, Geraldine Ferraro, had been her party's nominee for vice president.

== Ambassadors ==
The following is a chronological list of those who have held the position, under its various names. (It is unclear exactly when ambassadorial rank happened, but scattered references to the representatives as ambassadors can be found throughout the 1970s.) The position has gone vacant at times when the commission was not in session, or when no presidential appointment had been made or confirmed, or when the United States was not a member of the body.

United States representatives to the United Nations Commission on Human Rights

Image	Ambassador	Start of Term	End of Term
	Eleanor Roosevelt	1947	1953
	Mary Lord	1953	1961
	Marietta Tree	1961	1964
	Morris B. Abram	1965	1968

United States representatives to the United Nations Commission on Human Rights, with rank of Ambassador

Image	Ambassador	Start of Term	End of Term
	Rita Hauser	1969	1972
	Philip E. Hoffman	1972	1975
	Allard K. Lowenstein	1977	1977
	Edward Mezvinsky	1977	1979
	Jerome J. Shestack	1979	1980
	Michael Novak	1981	1982
	Richard Schifter	1983	1985
	E. Robert Wallach	1986	1986
	Armando Valladares	1988	1990
	Geraldine Ferraro	1993	1996
	Nancy Rubin	1997	2000
	Richard S. Williamson	2004	2005
	Rudy Boschwitz	2005	2006

United States representatives to the United Nations Human Rights Council, with rank of Ambassador

Image	Ambassador	Start of Term	End of Term
	Eileen Chamberlain Donahoe	2010	2013
	Keith Harper	2014	2017
	Michèle Taylor	2022	2025
