= E. Robert Wallach =

American lawyer (1934–2022)

Eugene Robert Wallach (April 11, 1934 – May 15, 2022) was a trial lawyer in California. He worked as a personal injury lawyer before moving to Washington, D.C. to become an unofficial adviser to Edwin Meese III. Through his work with Meese, he became involved in the Wedtech scandal,

Wallach served as United States Ambassador to the United Nations Human Rights Council in 1986.

In 1976, Wallach was a candidate for the United States Senate but he dropped out of the race before the primary. At the time, he was considered progressive Democrat and part of his platform was the decriminalization of marijuana.

Wallach died at his home in Alameda, California.

== Education ==
Wallach was a 1955 from the University of Southern California and then the UC Berkeley School of Law where he had been Meese’s moot court partner.
