= M. J. Hegar =

American politician and author

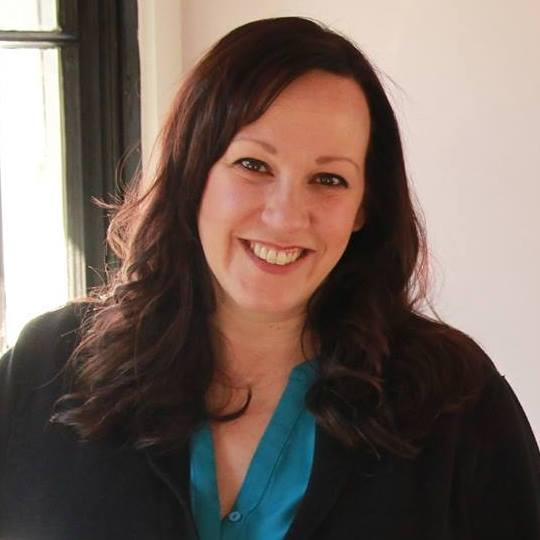
- Hegar in 2018

Personal details
- Born: Mary Ottilie von Stein; March 16, 1976 (age 50) Fairfield, Connecticut, U.S.
- Party: Democratic
- Spouse: Brandon Hegar (m. 2011)
- Children: 2
- Education: University of Texas at Austin (BA, MBA)
- Website: Official website

Military service
- Allegiance: United States
- Branch/service: United States Air Force
- Years of service: 1999–2011
- Rank: Major

Mary Jennings Hegar (née von Stein; born March 16, 1976) is an American United States Air Force veteran and former political candidate. In 2012, she sued the U.S. Air Force to remove the Combat Exclusion Policy. In 2017, she published the memoir Shoot Like a Girl, which describes her service in Afghanistan.

In July 2017, Hegar announced her candidacy for the Democratic nomination for United States House of Representatives to Texas's 31st congressional district. After winning the nomination, she lost to incumbent Republican John Carter by about 3%. She was the Democratic nominee in the 2020 United States Senate election in Texas, losing to incumbent Republican John Cornyn by ten percentage points.

== Early life and education ==
Hegar was seven years old when her mother, Grace, moved her and her sister from Fairfield, Connecticut, to Cedar Park, Texas. There Grace would remarry to a Vietnam veteran, David Jennings, when Hegar was ten.

Hegar was a high school class president, on the cheer squad, and played sports, including soccer.

Hegar completed a BA at the University of Texas at Austin (1999), where she studied criminology, sociology, philosophy, and world religions. She was also Air Force ROTC Vice Wing Commander of Detachment 825 and Deputy Commander of the Arnold Air Society. Hegar completed Leadership Austin Essential Class (2015). She completed an Executive MBA (2016) at University of Texas at Austin.

== Career ==
=== Military ===
In December 1999, Hegar was commissioned into the U.S. Air Force through ROTC at the University of Texas. From April 2000 to March 2004, she served on active duty as an aircraft maintenance officer. Initially stationed at Misawa Air Base in Misawa, Aomori, Japan, she was later stationed at Whiteman Air Force Base near Knob Noster, Missouri. At Whiteman, Hegar worked on the F-16 Fighting Falcon and the B-2 Stealth Bomber. Her maintenance career culminated in responsibility for 75% of all B-2 maintenance as a captain and selection as the Company Grade Officer of the Year for 2003.

In 2004, the Air National Guard selected Hegar for pilot training. Upon completion of her training at the top of her class, she served two deployments to Afghanistan as a HH-60 Pave Hawk helicopter pilot, flying Combat Search and Rescue on over 100 missions as well as Medevac missions as a helicopter pilot. As a member of the California Air National Guard, she was a pilot and trainer at the San Jose-based Counterdrug Task Force from 2007 to 2011.

In addition to the deployments to Afghanistan during the Operation Enduring Freedom – Afghanistan, Hegar flew marijuana eradication missions, suppressed wildfires with buckets of water on cargo slings, performed pilot duties in evacuating survivors from hurricane-devastated cities, and rescued civilians on civil search and rescue missions in California and at sea.

On July 29, 2009, on her third tour of Afghanistan, Hegar and her co-pilot were shot down near Kandahar while on a combat search-and-rescue mission. She was wounded by shrapnel in her arm and leg from Taliban ground fire but the crew transferred to other occupied rescue U.S. Army helicopters. Some of those being transported had to fly out standing on the skids during hostilities.

Hegar was awarded the Purple Heart (December 2009). Her actions on this mission earned her the Distinguished Flying Cross with Valor Device (2011). She was one of the few women to receive this medal after Amelia Earhart. In 2016, she described in great detail in a TEDx Talks presentation a 2007 mission to medevac a child .

Due to the restriction of the Combat Exclusion Policy on women applying for ground combat positions, and because she was medically disqualified from flying due to a serious back injury sustained during the 2009 mission, Hegar transitioned out of the Air National Guard and became a Reservist Liaison.

=== Other work ===
In 2010, Hegar relocated to Austin and worked as a program manager at Seton Healthcare Family until 2015. From 2015 to 2017, she was a consultant at Dell Computers.

Hegar has lectured at the University of Texas at Austin's McCombs School of Business and in the ROTC and women's studies departments. She has mentored cadets at UT and has served on the AFROTC Advisory Committee.

=== Writing ===
In March 2017, the Berkley Books imprint of Penguin Books published Hegar's memoir, Shoot Like a Girl, in a new military division called Caliber. In 2016, it was announced that the movie rights to the book had been optioned by TriStar Pictures, with Angelina Jolie reportedly in negotiations for the lead role.

=== Politics ===
On July 6, 2017, Hegar announced that she would seek the Democratic nomination for U.S. Representative in Texas's 31st congressional district. In May 2018, she won the nomination. In June, Hegar released a short-form political ad, "Doors", that described her military career, including being shot down in Afghanistan. The video went viral and drew the attention of celebrities like Lin-Manuel Miranda. Despite an unsuccessful bid for the November 2018 Texas Congressional District 31 seat she lost to 16 year Republican incumbent John Carter. He received 50.6% of the vote compared to Hegar's 47.6%; Carter's narrowest win.

Hegar followed up with an April 23, 2019, announcement that she would seek the Democratic nomination in the 2020 United States Senate election in Texas for the seat held by John Cornyn. She came in first in the March 3, 2020, primary with 22.37% of the vote, and won the July 14 runoff against Texas state Senator Royce West, who had received 14.7% of the primary vote.

Hegar's campaign would be endorsed by former president Barack Obama on September 25, 2020. Her campaign focused on her support for the Affordable Care Act (Obamacare), protecting individuals with preexisting conditions, and creating a public health insurance option. Cornyn won the election, 54% to 44%. Occurring during 2020, which saw historically high turnout, Hegar received 4,888,764 votes.

== Combat Exclusion Policy ==
Shortly after the 2009 mission when Hegar was wounded in Afghanistan, she was medically disqualified from flying. The military's Combat Exclusion Policy automatically eliminated her from applying for ground combat positions that would have moved her military career forward. She was barred from cross-training for a ground combat position (such as a special tactics officer) despite her expertise as a pilot, which had it not been for her gender would have been a next step.

In 2012, Hegar was the lead plaintiff with former U.S. Marine Corps Captain Zoe Bedell, U.S. Marine Corps First Lieutenant Colleen Farrell, U.S. Army Reserves Staff Sergeant Jennifer Hunt, and the Service Women's Action Network (SWAN) in a lawsuit against U.S. Secretary of Defense Leon Panetta asserting that the Combat Exclusion Policy was unconstitutional. Hegar said the suit was about military effectiveness and would give military commanders a larger pool of applicants. The lawsuit failed, but the policy, implemented in 1994, was repealed in January 2013.

== Personal life ==
In 2011, Hegar married Brandon Hegar, whom she knew from high school. She and her family live in Round Rock, Texas, a suburb of Austin. She has two sons as well as stepchildren from her husband's previous marriage.

Hegar has many tattoos, which were prominently featured in her 2018 viral campaign ad, "Doors." She has said that the cherry blossom tattoo on her shoulder was a way to cover up shrapnel scar tissue, to take control and make the wounds beautiful. In her book, she mentions being sexually assaulted by an Air Force medic during a physical exam. The ad also discussed the domestic violence perpetrated by her father against her, her mother, and her sister during her adolescent years.

== Honors and awards ==
- 2008: California Aviator of the Year
- 2009: Air Force Association, Outstanding Airmen of the Year
- 2013: Foreign Policy, The Leading Global Thinkers of 2013 – with Zoe Bedell, Colleen Farrell, and Jennifer Hunt
- 2015: Army Women's Foundation Hall of Fame, inductee
- 2017: Merrimack College, Honorary PhD of public affairs
- 2018: American Red Cross Metro New York North, Exceptional Service Award

=== Military ribbons ===
Ribbon	Description	Notes
	Distinguished Flying Cross with Valor Device	2011
Ribbon of the Purple Heart	Purple Heart	2009
	Air Medal	Four oak leaf clusters
	Air Force Commendation Medal	One oak leaf cluster
Ribbon of the NDSM	National Defense Service Medal	
	Afghanistan Campaign Medal	One service star
Ribbon of the HSM	Humanitarian Service Medal	
	Air Force Longevity Service Ribbon	
Ribbon of the USAF	Small Arms Expert Marksmanship Ribbon	
	Air Force Training Ribbon	

== Works and publications ==
- Hegar, Major Mary Jennings (27 November 2012). "Women Warriors Are On the Battlefield. Eliminate Outdated, Unfair Military Combat Exclusion Policy". American Civil Liberties Union.
- Hegar, Mary Jennings (14 December 2012). "Letters to the Editor: Breaking into the military's 'band of brothers'". The Washington Post. Archived from the original on 13 April 2013. – in response to retired Army Major General Robert H. Scales opinion piece of 6 Dec 2012 in The Washington Post
- Hegar, Mary Jennings (15 February 2013). "Making a case for females on the front lines". Houston Chronicle.
- Hegar, Mary Jennings (2016). Shoot Like a Girl: One Woman's Dramatic Fight in Afghanistan and on the Home Front. New York: Berkley, an imprint of Penguin Random House LLC. ISBN 978-1-101-98845-9. OCLC 935676913.

Party political offices
Preceded by David Alameel	Democratic nominee for U.S. Senator from Texas (Class 2); 2020	Succeeded by James Talarico
