= Combat Exclusion Policy =

1948–2013 US Armed Forces policy

The direct ground combat exclusion rule of the United States Armed Forces, commonly referred as Combat Exclusion Policy, dates back to 1948 when the Women's Armed Services Integration Act excluded women from combat positions.

== History ==
On 28 April 1993, combat exclusion was lifted from aviation positions by Secretary of Defense Les Aspin, permitting women to serve in almost any aviation capacity. Some restrictions were maintained on aviation units in direct support of ground units and special operations aviation units.

In 1994, Aspin officially rescinded the "risk rule" in a memo, titled "Direct Ground Combat Definition and Assignment Rule":

A. Rule. Service members are eligible to be assigned to all positions for which they are qualified, except that women shall be excluded from assignment to units below the brigade level whose primary mission is to engage in direct combat on the ground, as defined below.

B. Definition. Direct ground combat is engaging an enemy on the ground with individual or crew served weapons, while being exposed to hostile fire and to a high probability of direct physical contact with the hostile force’s personnel. Direct ground combat takes place well forward on the battlefield while locating and closing with the enemy to defeat them by fire, maneuver, or shock effect.

The policy also excluded women being assigned to certain organizations based upon proximity to direct combat or "collocation" as the policy specifically refers to it. According to the Army, collocation occurs when, "the position or unit routinely physically locates and remains with a military unit assigned a doctrinal mission to routinely engage in direct combat." If a support soldier lives and works in the same area as a combat soldier, then they are "collocated". How this affects assignments is that if a unit whose mission does not exclude females, for example a medical unit, is a subunit of a unit whose mission is that of direct combat, like an infantry unit, the medical unit will be closed to women because of collocation.

In 2011, a commission headed by Lester L. Lyles, a retired Air Force general, recommended eliminating the policy, calling it a hindrance to promotion.

In February 2012, a review of Pentagon policies resulted in the lifting of restrictions on 14,000 military positions. Women remained ineligible to serve in 238,000 positions, about a fifth of the armed forces.

Women serving in the U.S. military in the past have often seen combat despite the Combat Exclusion Policy. Due to a shortage of troops, women were temporarily attached to direct combat units slipping in through a bureaucratic loophole. Although they were not supposed to be in positions that engaged in direct combat, and were ineligible for combat pay, thousands of women have engaged the enemy directly in Operations Iraqi and Enduring Freedom.

=== Policy lifted ===
The Combat Exclusion Policy was lifted as of 24 January 2013, following a unanimous recommendation by the Joint Chiefs of Staff. Both men and women are eligible to serve in front line combat and complete combat operations. The lifting of the ban was announced at a Pentagon press conference by Defense Secretary Leon E. Panetta, and the joint chiefs chairmen, Army Gen. Martin E. Dempsey. Panetta said that the ban was lifted because "If members of our military can meet the qualifications for a job, then they should have the right to serve, regardless of creed, color, gender or sexual orientation".

The various service branches were given until January 2016 to implement changes and submit requests to exclude specific Military Occupational Specialties from the ban being lifted. Panetta further said that initial implementation plans were to be submitted to him by 15 May 2014.

== See also ==
- Women in combat
