= Freedom Online Coalition =

International internet freedom organization

- Freedom Online Coalition logo
- Abbreviation: FOC
- Formation: December 8, 2011; 14 years ago
- Founded at: The Hague, the Netherlands
- Type: International organization
- Purpose: Advancing internet freedom
- Members: 41 (2026)
- Coalition Chair: Netherlands
- Website: freedomonlinecoalition.com

The Freedom Online Coalition (FOC) is a group of 41 governments that work together to advance internet freedom, mainly through shaping global norms through Joint Statements, multi-stakeholder engagement with their Advisory Network and through coordinating diplomatic initiatives and interventions at relevant international forums. The Freedom Online Coalition was launched at a conference of the Dutch Government in The Hague, the Netherlands in December 2011. The FOC's administrative functions are managed by Global Partners Digital, a United Kingdom-based organization, headquartered in London.

== About ==
Participating countries commit to "promoting the freedoms of expression, association, and peaceful assembly with respect to the Internet and connection technologies." They endorse the principle that the human rights that people have offline should enjoy the same protection online, including freedom of assembly and the right to organize and the right to be protected from "arbitrary" intrusions into their privacy. Its work builds on the resolution on "The Promotion, Protection and Enjoyment of Human Rights on the Internet" adopted by United Nations Human Rights Council in July 2012. The coalition has also endorsed a set of recommendations for cybersecurity policy making that respects human rights as well as a definition of cybersecurity. In 2020, the FOC published a Joint Statement on Spread of Disinformation Online, a normative instrument outlining ways to address disinformation and counter its use in undermining human rights, law, and democracy.

Periodically, the FOC holds a multistakeholder Conference that aims to deepen the discussion on how freedom of expression on the Internet is helping to promote social, cultural and economic development. Previous Conferences have been held in The Netherlands (2011), Kenya (2012), Tunisia (2013), Estonia (2014), Mongolia (2015), Costa Rica (2016), Germany (2018), Ghana (2020), and Finland (2021).

== Members ==
As of December 2024, the FOC had 41 full members. The countries participating in the FOC are as follows:

Countries participating

- Argentina
- Armenia
- Australia
- Austria
- Cape Verde
- Canada
- Chile
- Colombia
- Costa Rica
- Czech Republic
- Denmark
- Estonia
- Finland
- France
- Georgia
- Germany
- Ghana
- Iceland
- Ireland
- Italy
- Japan
- Kenya
- Latvia
- Lithuania
- Luxembourg
- Maldives
- Mexico
- Moldova
- Mongolia
- Netherlands
- New Zealand
- Norway
- Poland
- Slovakia
- Slovenia
- South Korea
- Spain
- Sweden
- Switzerland
- Tunisia
- United Kingdom

=== Former members ===
- United States (withdrew January 2026)

== Chair ==
The day-to-day political coordination of the Coalition rests in the hands of the Coalition Chair. The Coalition Chair rotates among member states on an annual basis. The Chair provides diplomatic support and coordinates the overall FOC activities. The 2024 Chair of the FOC is the Netherlands.

== See also ==
- Digital rights
- Internet censorship
- Internet censorship and surveillance by country
- Internet freedom
- Right to Internet access
