= Philip E. Hoffman =

American lawyer and diplomat of the 20th century

Philip E. Hoffman (October 2, 1908 – June 6, 1993) was a lawyer, former national president of the American Jewish Committee (1969 to 1973; he was also chairman of its board of governors from 1963 to 1967) and an American Ambassador to the United Nations Human Rights Council from 1972 to 1975.

Hoffman grew up on the Upper West Side of Manhattan, graduated in 1929 from Dartmouth College and from Yale Law School in 1932. A resident of Verona, New Jersey, he died on June 6, 1993, in Livingston, New Jersey.
