= Internet freedom =

Digital rights, freedom of information and the right to Internet access and speech

Internet freedom is an umbrella term that encompasses digital rights, freedom of information, the right to Internet access, freedom from Internet censorship, and net neutrality.

== As a human right ==
Those who support internet freedom as a human right include the United Nations Human Rights Council, who declared internet freedom a Human Right in 2012. Eric Sterner agrees with the end goals of internet freedom but thinks that focusing on democracy and other freedoms is the best strategy.

== Relatively free internets ==
J. Goldsmith notes the discrepancies in fundamental rights around free speech that exist between Europe and the United States, for example, and how that impacts internet freedom. In addition, the proliferation in certain kinds of speech that spreads false information and weakens trust in the accuracy of content online remains a topic of concern around internet freedom in all countries. The EU's Digital Services Act (DSA) seeks to control disinformation and misinformation on social media. It came into effect in 2023 and applies to large online platforms and search engines. The DSA requires platforms to take measures to limit the spread of disinformation and harmful content, such as removing or demoting it. It also requires platforms to be more transparent about their algorithms and content moderation practices. In doing so, the DSA aims to harmonize different national laws in the European Union that have emerged (since the Electronic Commerce Directive 2000) to address illegal content at national level.

== Relatively unfree internets ==
Some countries work to ban certain sites and or words that limit internet freedom. The People's Republic of China (PRC) has the world's largest number of Internet users and one of the most sophisticated and aggressive Internet censorship and control regimes in the world. In 2020, Freedom House ranked China last of 64 nations in internet freedom.

== Related organizations ==
- Knight First Amendment Institute at Columbia University
- Internet Freedom Foundation
- Electronic Frontier Foundation
- Freedom Online Coalition
- Article 19
- Open Technology Fund
- Global Internet Freedom Project at George Washington University Law School
- Free Expression Network
- U.S. Agency for Global Media's Office of Internet Freedom

== See also ==
- Censorship of Wikipedia
- Free culture movement
- Freedom of information
- Freedom of speech
- Information wants to be free
- Pirate Party
- Public domain
- Steal This Film
- Digital rights organizations
