= Zev Shapiro =

Zev Shapiro (born Zev Dickstein) is an American student activist and social entrepreneur based in Cambridge, MA.

Shapiro was born and raised in Cambridge, Massachusetts. He graduated from Cambridge Rindge and Latin School and currently attends Harvard University.

Shapiro acted as campaign manager for unsuccessful candidate Joyce Gerber in the 2013 Cambridge School Committee elections, at the age of eleven. He has volunteered for the campaigns of Democratic politicians Elizabeth Warren, Ed Markey and Maura Healey. In 2014, he was invited to the State of the Union as Elizabeth Warren’s guest. In 2018, Shapiro spoke in support of a Massachusetts civics education bill. In 2019, Shapiro launched TurnUp, an app that aims to improve youth voter turnout (high school seniors and college students).
