= 2015 Houston, Texas Proposition 1 =

Proposition 1
- November 3, 2015

Results
Choice	Votes	%
Yes	100,582	39.03%
No	157,110	60.97%
Valid votes	257,692	95.84%
Invalid or blank votes	11,180	4.16%
Total votes	268,872	100.00%
Registered voters/turnout	979,401	27.45%
- Source: "Cumulative Report — Official Harris County, Texas — General and Special Elections — November 03, 2015", Harris County Elections Office, November 11, 2015, archived from the original on December 22, 2015

Proposition 1 was a referendum held on November 3, 2015, on the anti-discrimination ordinance known as the Houston Equal Rights Ordinance (HERO). The ordinance was intended to improve anti-discrimination coverage based on sexual orientation and gender identity in Houston, specifically in areas such as housing and occupation where no anti-discrimination policy existed. Proposition 1 asked voters whether they approved HERO. Houston voters rejected Proposal 1 by a vote of 61% to 39%.

== Background and results ==
In 2014, neither U.S. federal law nor Texas statewide law specifically covered sexual orientation or gender identity in employment and housing discrimination and services. On May 28, 2014, the Houston City Council voted 11–6 to enact the Houston Equal Rights Ordinance (HERO) which was authored by Houston's then-Mayor, Annise Parker. The measure banned discrimination on the basis of sexual orientation, gender identity, sex, race, color, ethnicity, national origin, age, religion, disability, pregnancy, genetic information, family, marital, and military status. The ordinance applied to businesses that serve the public, private employers, housing, city employment and city contracting. Religious institutions would be exempt. Violators could be fined up to $5,000. HERO took effect on June 27, 2014 and enforcement for it was suspended 6 days later on July 3, 2014.

Opposition to HERO arose because the ordinance protected "transgender residents' ability to use the restroom consistent with their gender expression, regardless of their biological sex." HERO became known to some as the "Bathroom Law." Shortly after the ordinance passed, opponents of HERO drafted a petition and began gathering signatures to add a ballot measure to the November 2014 ballot to repeal the ordinance. City law required 17,296 valid signatures from registered Houston voters for a successful veto referendum petition, which would require the city council to either rescind the targeted ordinance themselves or put it before voters. This requirement was calculated by taking 10 percent of the greatest number of votes cast for mayor in any of the three preceding years. Moreover, signatures had to be submitted before the ordinance was scheduled to take effect or within 30 days of the publication of the approved ordinance, whichever came first. Opponents of HERO presented about 50,000 signatures to the Houston city secretary's office on July 3, 2014.

Although the city secretary found enough valid signatures to make the petition sufficient, the city attorney advised her of certain problems with enough of the petition sheets to invalidate the petition. These problems included signature gatherers who were not registered to vote and petition sheets that were not signed by the signature gatherer responsible for them, as well as other, more technical problems. The city announced that the opponents were 2,022 signatures short of the 17,269 needed to put the matter to a vote. HERO opponents filed a lawsuit against Mayor Annise Parker and the city on August 5, 2014. In response, city attorneys defending the law filed subpoenas for sermons from local Christian pastors. Attorneys for the pastors called the subpoenas retaliation against Christians for opposing the ordinance. Parker maintained that the attorneys who dealt with the lawsuit for the city were outside lawyers (i.e., not city employees) and that she and City Attorney David Feldman had been unaware of the subpoenas. After what some news organizations called a "firestorm" of criticism over the subpoenas (Parker said that she had been "vilified coast to coast"), Parker directed the city's attorneys on October 29, 2014, to withdraw the subpoenas.

After the subpoenas were withdrawn, local city pastors filed a civil rights lawsuit against Parker. The lawsuit went to trial on January 19, 2015. Feldman announced on December 19, 2014, his plans to resign from his position as Houston City Attorney shortly before the trial began. He said that the primary reason for his resignation was a desire to return to private practice. He also noted, however, that his decision to resign was related to the lawsuit as well, saying, "Being on the outside, I'm going to be a lot freer to tell the story and to explain it to people and to debunk the myth." As reported by the Houston Chronicle, Feldman noted, too, that if he testified in the trial as the city attorney, it would prohibit other attorneys from the city's legal department from serving as counsel for the city. On February 13, 2015, a jury issued a verdict saying that while the petitions did not contain instances of fraud, they did contain forgeries and instances of failure to follow proper procedure. District Judge Robert Schaffer then initiated a recounting process to determine whether or not opponents of HERO had gathered enough valid signatures to satisfy the threshold of 17,296. Following the verdict in February, both sides claimed victory. A definitive answer, however, did not emerge until Judge Schaffer's ruling on April 17, 2015, when he determined that the opponents of the ordinance had not gathered enough valid signatures.

In May 2015, opponents of the ordinance asked the Texas Supreme Court for a writ of mandamus against the city of Houston. On July 24, 2015, the court granted this petition and ruled that the Houston City Council should have honored the city secretary's initial signature count and must either repeal the ordinance or include it on the November 2015 ballot, writing in a per curiam opinion, "We agree ... that the city secretary certified their petition and thereby invoked the city council's ministerial duty to reconsider and repeal the ordinance or submit it to popular vote. The legislative power reserved to the people of Houston is not being honored."

The original ballot language crafted by the City of Houston was also challenged in court. After the Texas Supreme Court threw out the original wording, the city revised the ballot language.

The following question was placed on the 2015 general election ballot in Houston as Proposition 1:

Are you in favor of the Houston Equal Rights Ordinance, Ord. No. 2014-530, which prohibits discrimination in city employment and city services, city contracts, public accommodations, private employment, and housing based on an individual's sex, race, color, ethnicity, national origin, age, familial status, marital status, military status, religion, disability, sexual orientation, genetic information, gender identity, or pregnancy?

On November 3, 2015, Houston voters voted by a 61%–39% margin to reject Proposition 1. This vote overturned the Houston Equal Rights Ordinance (HERO).

== Support and opposition ==
A "YES" vote was a vote to retain the Houston Equal Rights Ordinance; a "NO" vote was a vote to repeal it.

=== Yes on Proposition 1 ===
Proposition 1 gained the support of various citizens and organizations. The "YES" side raised $1,918,552 (as of December 4, 2015).

Yes on Proposition 1

Individual endorsements

- Chris Bell, former U.S. Representative, former Houston City Council member, candidate for Mayor in 2001 and nominee for Governor of Texas in 2006
- Hillary Clinton, former U.S. Secretary of State
- Stephen Costello, Houston City Council member
- Wendy Davis, former Texas State Senator and Texas gubernatorial candidate in 2014
- Adrian Garcia, former Harris County Sheriff and former Houston City Council member
- Martin O'Malley, former Maryland Governor
- Barack Obama, U.S. President
- Annise Parker, Houston mayor
- Cecile Richards, president of the Planned Parenthood Federation of America
- Bernie Sanders, U.S. Senator
- Sylvester Turner, State Representative and candidate for Mayor in 1991 and 2003
- Dustin Lance Black, screenwriter, director, film and television producer
- Matt Bomer, actor
- Adam Bouska, fashion photographer
- Jason Collins, athlete
- Sally Field, actress
- Chris Kluwe, athlete
- Marty McVey, private equity executive
- Jim Parsons, actor
- Michael Sam, athlete
- George Takei, actor

Organizations

- ACLU of Texas
- Apple Inc.
- BASF
- Equality Texas
- EMC Corporation
- General Electric
- Greater Houston Partnership
- Harris County Democratic Party
- Freedom For All Americans
- Hewlett Packard
- Houston GLBT Political Caucus
- Houston Unites
- Human Rights Campaign
- NAACP Houston Branch
- Texas Freedom Network

=== No on Proposition 1 ===
Proposition 1 was opposed by various citizens and organizations. These included the Campaign for Houston, which was described as an anti-LGBT hate group by the Southern Poverty Law Center. The "NO" side raised $398,472 (as of December 4, 2015).

No on Proposition 1

Individuals opposed

- Greg Abbott, Governor of Texas
- Art Aguilar, candidate for Houston Community College Trustee Election Trustee District III in 2015
- Kendall Baker, candidate for Houston City Council member in 2015
- Manny Barrera, candidate for Houston City Council member in 2015
- Jim Bigham, candidate for Houston City Councilmember in 2015
- Jack Christie, Houston City Council member
- Florida Cooper, candidate for Houston Community College Trustee Election Trustee District II in 2015
- Abel Davila, candidate for Houston City Council member in 2015
- Diana Davila, candidate for Houston Independent School District Trustee Election District VIII in 2015
- Willie R. Davis, candidate for Houston City Council member in 2015
- Vince Duncan, candidate for Houston City Council member in 2015
- Bill Frazer, candidate for Houston City Controller
- Herlinda Garcia, candidate for Houston City Council member in 2015
- Franklin Graham, pastor
- Ben Hall, attorney, former Houston City Attorney and candidate for Mayor in 2013
- Steven F. Hotze, president of Campaign for Houston
- Carl Jarvis, candidate for Houston City Council member in 2015
- Bill King, attorney and former Mayor of Kemah
- Mike Knox, candidate for Houston City Council member in 2015
- Michael Kubosh, Houston City Council member
- Steve Le, candidate for Houston City Council member in 2015
- Ann McCoy, candidate for Houston Independent School District Trustee Election District IV in 2015
- Sandie Moger, candidate for Houston City Council member in 2015
- Roy Morales, candidate for Houston City Council member in 2015
- Dan Patrick, Lieutenant Governor of Texas
- Manuel Rodriguez, Houston Independent School District Trustee, District III
- Brenda Stardig, Houston City Council member
- Evelyn Thompson, candidate for Houston City Council member in 2015
- Jared Woodfill, former chairman of the Harris County Republican Party
- Lance Berkman, athlete
- Bob McNair, Houston Texans owner

Organizations

- Baptist Ministers Association of Houston and Vicinity
- Family Research Council
- The Heritage Foundation

== Voter turnout ==
Proposition 1 votes	Registered voters in Houston, Texas	Pct
268,872	979,401	27.45%

== Aftermath ==
=== Political ===
On November 10, President Barack Obama officially announced his support for the Equality Act of 2015.

Houston Mayor Annise Parker stated: "I fear that this will have stained Houston's reputation as a tolerant, welcoming, global city. I absolutely fear that there will be a direct economic backlash as a result of this ordinance going into defeat and that's sad for Houston."

Sylvester Turner, who ran against Bill King in the 2015 Houston mayoral runoff election, said he is "100 percent" committed to reenacting Houston Equal Rights Ordinance (HERO) and attacked Bill King for saying he won't revisit the issue of HERO, along with his support from the Campaign for Houston. On December 12, 2015, Sylvester Turner beat Bill King and won the 2015 Houston mayoral runoff election.

=== Sports ===
On November 22, 2015, the National Collegiate Athletic Association said it would reconsider procedures in how it selects host cities for tournaments and championship events to include protections for the LGBT community.

In reaction, the NFL announced it would not alter plans to have the city host Super Bowl LI. Website Outsports claimed that the outcome of the vote could mean that "Houston is no longer a 'safe place' for LGBT people to visit or do business, as they can be turned away from a hotel or by a waiter or cab driver, simply for 'looking or acting' gay or being trans".

== See also ==
- LGBT rights in Texas
- Politics of Houston
