= Tropical Storm Allison =

Atlantic tropical storm in 2001

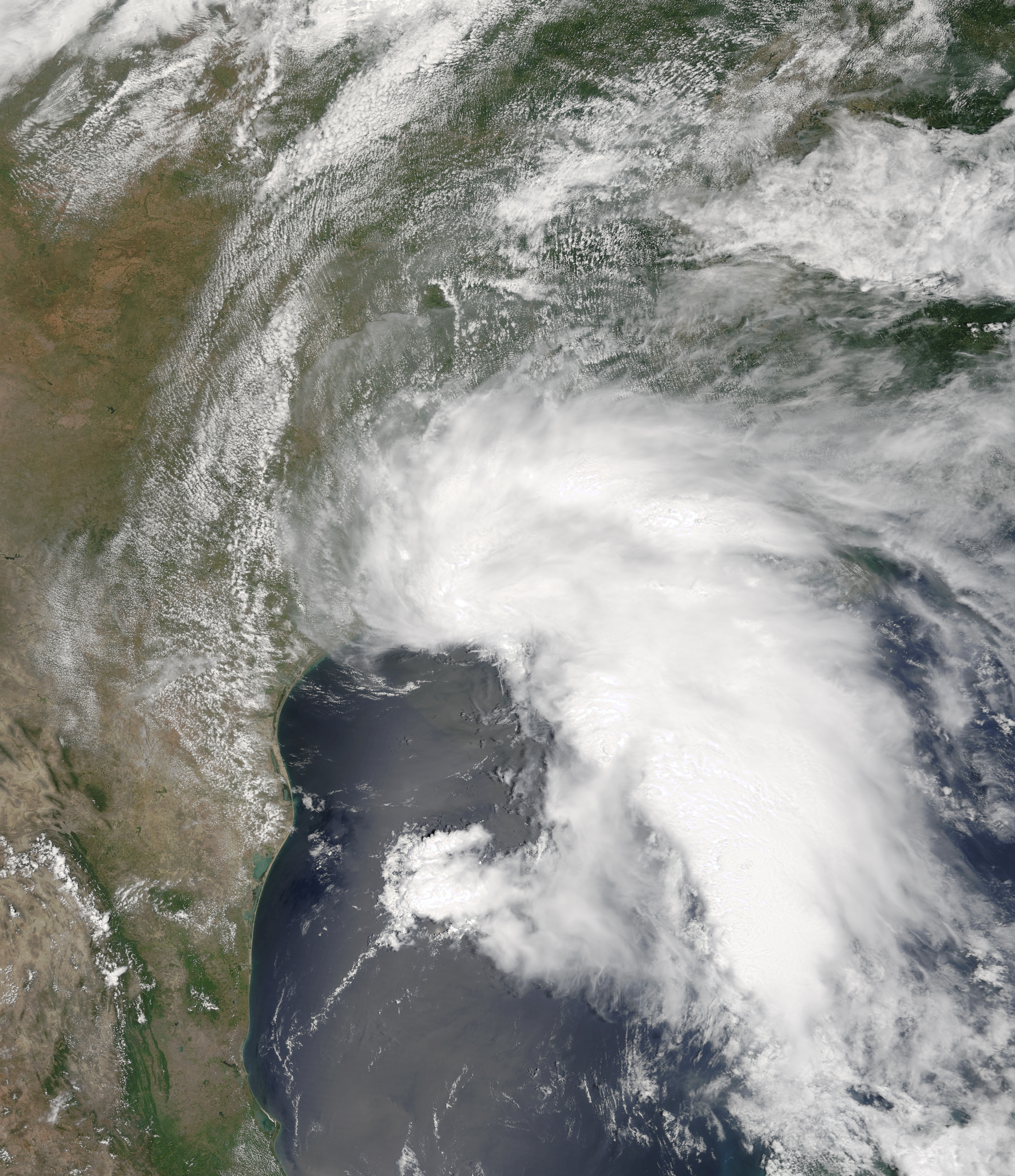
- Tropical Storm Allison south of Houston on June 5

Meteorological history
- Formed: June 5, 2001
- Subtropical: June 10, 2001
- Extratropical: June 17, 2001
- Dissipated: June 20, 2001

Tropical storm
- 1-minute sustained (SSHWS/NWS)
- Highest winds: 60 mph (95 km/h)
- Lowest pressure: 1000 mbar (hPa); 29.53 inHg

Overall effects
- Fatalities: 50 total
- Damage: $8.5 billion (2001 USD)
- Areas affected: Gulf Coast of the United States; East Coast of the United States; Atlantic Canada
- IBTrACS
- Part of the 2001 Atlantic hurricane season

Tropical Storm Allison was a weak but devastating tropical cyclone that struck southeast Texas in June 2001. It lasted unusually long for a June storm, remaining tropical and subtropical for 16 days, most of which was when the storm was over land dumping torrential rainfall. The storm developed from a tropical wave in the northern Gulf of Mexico on June 5, and struck the upper Texas coast shortly thereafter. It drifted northward through the state, turned back to the south, and re-entered the Gulf of Mexico. The storm continued to the east-northeast, made landfall on Louisiana, then moved across the southeast United States and Mid-Atlantic. Allison was the first storm since Tropical Storm Frances in 1998 to strike the northern Texas coastline.

The storm dropped heavy rainfall along its path, peaking at over 40 inches (1,000 mm) in Texas. The worst flooding occurred in Houston, where most of Allison's damage occurred: 30,000 became homeless after the storm flooded over 70,000 houses and destroyed 2,744 homes. Downtown Houston was inundated with flooding, causing severe damage to hospitals and businesses. Twenty-three people died in Texas. Along its entire path, Allison caused $8.5 billion (2001 USD, equivalent to $14.7 billion in 2025) in damage and 50 deaths. Aside from Texas, the places worst hit were Louisiana and southeastern Pennsylvania.

Following the storm, President George W. Bush designated 75 counties along Allison's path as disaster areas, which enabled the citizens affected to apply for aid. Then the fourth-costliest Atlantic tropical cyclone and still the costliest Atlantic tropical cyclone that was never a major hurricane, Allison was the first Atlantic tropical storm to have its name retired without ever having reached hurricane strength, and the only until Tropical Storm Erika in 2015.

== Meteorological history ==
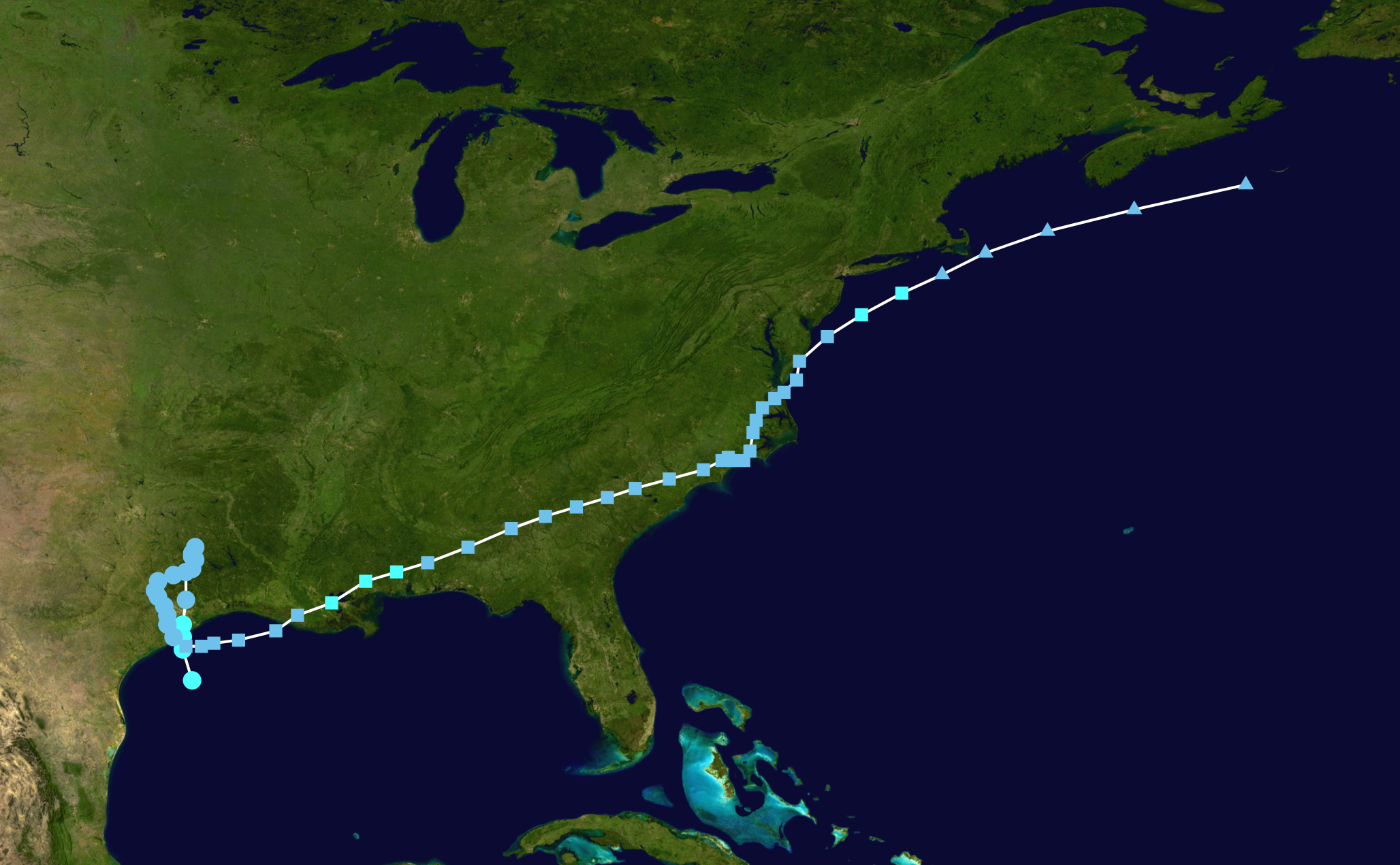
Map plotting the storm's track and intensity, according to the Saffir–Simpson scale Map key Saffir–Simpson scale Tropical depression (≤38 mph, ≤62 km/h) Tropical storm (39–73 mph, 63–118 km/h) Category 1 (74–95 mph, 119–153 km/h) Category 2 (96–110 mph, 154–177 km/h) Category 3 (111–129 mph, 178–208 km/h) Category 4 (130–156 mph, 209–251 km/h) Category 5 (≥157 mph, ≥252 km/h) Unknown Storm type Tropical cyclone Subtropical cyclone Extratropical cyclone, remnant low, tropical disturbance, or monsoon depression

A tropical wave moved off the coast of Africa on May 21, 2001. It moved westward across the Atlantic Ocean, retaining little convection on its way. After moving across South America and the southwestern Caribbean, the wave entered the eastern North Pacific Ocean on June 1. A low-level circulation developed on June 2, while it was about 230 mi (370 km) south-southeast of Salina Cruz, Mexico. Southerly flow forced the system northward, and the wave moved inland on June 3. The low-level circulation dissipated, though the mid-level circulation persisted. It emerged into the Gulf of Mexico on June 4, and developed deep convection on its eastern side. Early on June 5, satellite imagery suggested that a tropical depression was forming in the northwest Gulf of Mexico, which was furthered by reports of wind gusts as high as 60 mph (95 km/h) just a few hundred feet above the surface, towards the east side of the system.

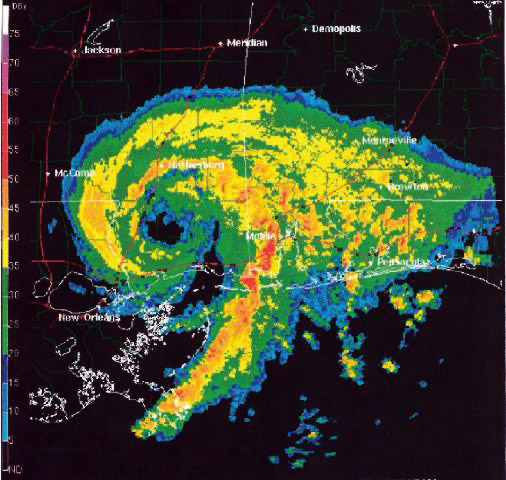
Subtropical Storm Allison with an eye-like feature over Mississippi

At 12:00 UTC on June 5, the disturbance developed a broad, low-level circulation, and was classified as Tropical Storm Allison, the first storm of the 2001 Atlantic hurricane season. Some intensification was projected, though it was expected to be hindered by cool offshore sea surface temperatures. Due to the cold-core nature of the center, Allison initially contained subtropical characteristics. Despite this, the storm quickly strengthened to attain peak sustained winds of 60 mph (95 km/h), with tropical storm-force winds extending up to 230 mi (370 km) east of the center, and a minimum central pressure of 1,000 millibars (29.53 inHg). The storm initially moved very little, and the presence of several small vortices from within the deep convection caused difficulty in determining the exact center location. Later in the day, several different track forecasts arose. One scenario had the cyclone tracking westward into Mexico. Another projected the storm moving east towards southern Louisiana. At the time, it was noted that little rain or wind persisted near the center, but rather to the north and east. Under the steering currents of a subtropical ridge that extended in an east–west orientation across the southeast United States, Allison weakened while nearing the Texas coastline, and struck near Freeport, Texas with 50 mph (85 km/h) winds. Inland, the storm rapidly weakened, and the National Hurricane Center discontinued advisories early on June 6. Shortly after being downgraded to a tropical depression, surface observations showed an elongated circulation with a poorly defined center, which had reformed closer to the deep convection.

The depression drifted northward until reaching Lufkin, Texas, where it stalled due to a high pressure system to its north. While stalling over Texas, the storm dropped excessive rainfall, peaking at just over 40 inches (1,000 mm) in northwestern Jefferson County. On June 7, the subtropical ridge off Florida weakened, while the ridge west of Texas intensified. This steered Tropical Depression Allison to make a clockwise loop, and the storm began drifting to the southwest. As the center reached Huntsville, Texas, a heavy rain band began to back build from Louisiana westward into Liberty County, Texas, which had caused additional flooding. At the time, the system had a minimum central pressure of about 1,004 millibars (29.65 inHg) and maximum sustained winds of about 10 mph (16 km/h). Late on June 9 and early on June 10, Allison's remnants reentered reached the Gulf of Mexico and emerged over open waters. The low once again became nearly stationary about 60 mi (97 km) south of Galveston, Texas, and despite more favorable upper-level winds, it showed no signs of redevelopment. Due to dry air and moderate westerly wind shear, the storm transitioned into a subtropical cyclone. While the subtropical depression moved eastward, a new low level circulation redeveloped to the east, and Allison quickly made landfall on Morgan City, Louisiana on June 11. At around the same time, the surface center reformed to the east-northeast of its previous location, aligning with the mid-level circulation. Strong thunderstorms redeveloped over the circulation, and Allison strengthened into a subtropical storm over southeastern Louisiana. The storm intensified further to attain sustained winds of 45 mph (75 km/h) and a minimum barometric pressure of about 1,000 millibars (29.53 inHg) near Mclain, Mississippi, accompanied by a well-defined eye-like feature.

The storm was officially downgraded to a subtropical depression at 0000 UTC on June 12. Somewhat accelerating, the depression tracked to the east-northeast through Mississippi, Alabama, Georgia, and South Carolina before becoming nearly stationary near Wilmington, North Carolina. The depression drifted through North Carolina and sped to the northeast for a time in response to an approaching cold front. Though satellite and radar imagery show the system was well-organized, the system slowed and moved erratically for a period of time, executing what appeared to be a small counterclockwise loop. The storm began tracking in a generally northeasterly direction, and crossed into the southern Delmarva Peninsula on June 16. The subtropical remnants reached the Atlantic on June 17, and while located east of Atlantic City, New Jersey, winds began to restrengthen, and heavy rains formed to the north of the circulation. The low was interacting with a frontal boundary, and started merging with it, as it accelerated to the northeast at 13 mph (21 km/h). The remnants of Allison briefly reintensified to a subtropical storm through baroclinic processes, though it became extratropical while south of Long Island. By later on June 17, the low was situated off the coast of Rhode Island, spreading a swath of precipitation over New England. The remnants of the tropical storm were then absorbed by the frontal boundary by June 18, and eventually passed south of Cape Race, Newfoundland on June 20, where the extratropical cyclone dissipated.

== Preparations ==
Shortly after the storm formed, officials in Galveston County, Texas issued a voluntary evacuation for the western end of Galveston Island, as the area was not protected by the Galveston Seawall. The ferry from the island to the Bolivar Peninsula was closed, while voluntary evacuations were issued in Surfside in Brazoria County. When the National Hurricane Center issued the first advisory on Allison, officials issued Tropical Storm Warnings from Sargent, Texas to Morgan City, Louisiana. After the storm made landfall, flash flood watches and warnings were issued for numerous areas in eastern Texas. During the flood event, the National Weather Service in Houston issued 99 flash flood warnings with an average lead time of 40 minutes. With an average lead time of 24 minutes, the National Weather Service in Lake Charles, Louisiana issued 47 flash flood warnings. With an average lead time of 39 minutes, the National Weather Service in New Orleans/Baton Rouge issued 87 flash flood warnings, of which 30 were not followed by a flash flood.

In Tallahassee, Florida, a shelter opened the day before Allison's movement northward through the area, seven staff members housing 12 people. Two other shelters were on standby. Teams informed citizens in the Florida panhandle of flood dangers.

== Impact ==
Death tolls by State
Area	Deaths
Texas	23
Louisiana	1
Mississippi	1
Florida	8
North Carolina	9
Virginia	1
Pennsylvania	7
Total	50

Tropical Storm Allison impacted much of the Gulf and Atlantic coast of the United States, from Texas to New England. Most of the impacts were in the form of rainfall, although Allison also spawned at least 23 tornadoes. Nationwide, Allison caused approximately $8.5 billion in damage (2001 USD), making it the costliest American tropical storm. Allison also caused 41 direct deaths throughout the country, while an additional 9 people died due to indirect causes, all by traffic accidents related to the storm in North Carolina.

=== Texas ===
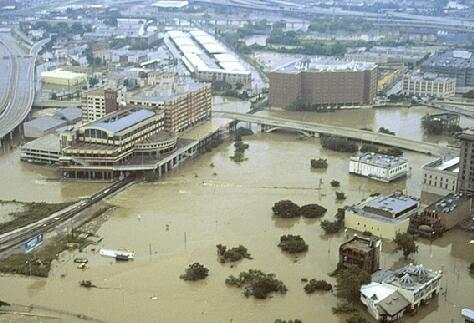
Buffalo Bayou and White Oak Bayou at Main Street after Tropical Storm Allison hit Houston

Throughout Texas, Allison left at least $5.16 billion (2001 USD) in damage. The storm killed 23 people, including 12 deaths from driving, 6 from walking, 3 from electrocution, 1 in an elevator, and 1 drowning death in a ditch. However, some survivors disputed the claim of the fatality inside an elevator, suggesting that the victim may have instead been swept away by floodwaters while attempting to reach the elevator.

Allison made landfall with a storm surge of 2 to 3 ft (0.61 to 0.91 m). Combined with waves on top, areas of Galveston Island experienced a wall of water 8 feet (2.4 m) in height, creating overwash along the coastline. The storm caused winds of up to 43 mph (69 km/h) at the Galveston Pier. While Allison was stalling over Texas, it dropped heavy rainfall across the state, including 9.77 inches (248 mm) in Galveston, 12.13 inches (308 mm) in Jamaica Beach, Texas, and other similar totals along the coast. Minimal beach erosion was reported, and impact was minimal near the coast. While moving northward through Texas as a minimal tropical depression, Allison produced minor wind gusts. Shortly after making landfall, the storm spawned a tornado in Manvel of Brazoria County, causing damage to one home. Within hours of making landfall, rainfall totals of 8 to 12 inches (200 to 300 millimetres) were common in Galveston and Harris County. Flash flooding continued for days, with rainfall amounts across the state peaking at just over 40 inches (1,000 mm) in northwestern Jefferson County. In the Port of Houston, a total of 36.99 inches (940 mm) was reported.

Houston experienced torrential rainfall in a short amount of time. The six-day rainfall in Houston amounted to 38.6 inches (980 mm). Houston Hobby Airport received 20.84 inches (529 mm) of rain from June 5 to 10, 2001, while Bush Intercontinental Airport received 16.48 inches (419 mm). Two-thirds of the bayous and creeks in Harris County experienced 500-year flood events. Houston Intercontinental Airport, which typically receives 46.07 inches (1,170 mm) of rain in a year, experienced 35.7% of its expected total in the first nine days of June. The deluge flooded 95,000 automobiles and 73,000 houses throughout Harris County. Tropical Storm Allison destroyed 2,744 homes, leaving 30,000 homeless with residential damages totaling to $1.76 billion (2001 USD). Residential neighborhoods inside and to the north of Interstate 610 were hardest hit. Additionally, five of the six bayou systems in downtown Houston were severely flooded. Four of them broke 100-year high-water records, causing excessive surface run-off.

Several hospitals in the Texas Medical Center, the largest medical complex in the world, experienced severe damage from the storm, which hit quickly and with unexpected fury on a Friday evening. Hospital personnel were forced to evacuate thousands of patients in a major effort that included Coast Guard and Army helicopters. Many of the hospitals had lost all power, including back-up generators, meaning that patients had to be carried down dark stairwells by the staff in temperatures over 100 °F (38 °C). Patients who could not breathe on their own had to be continuously manually ventilated during the evacuation, which lasted hours. Most hospitals lost power and backup power when basements, the area where power and research data were kept, flooded. The Baylor College of Medicine experienced major damage, totaling $495 million (2001 USD). The medical school lost 90,000 research animals, 60,000 tumor samples, and 25 years of research data. The University of Texas Health Science Center at Houston, across the street, lost thousands of laboratory animals, including expensive genetic-specific mice. Decades of research was lost, including, for many scientists, their life's work. The UT-Houston gross anatomy lab, cyclotron, and other important facilities were completely destroyed. Throughout the Medical Center, damage totaled to over $2 billion (2001 USD). Most were reopened after a month, though it took much longer to become fully operational.

The storm flooded the lower level of the massive law library at the University of Houston Law Center with 8 feet (2.4 m) of water. An estimated 174,000 books and the microfiche collection were destroyed, with damage totaling approximately $35 million. The Federal Emergency Management Agency (FEMA) gave $21.4 million to rebuild the law library collection. The tunnel system, which connects most large office buildings in downtown Houston, was submerged, as were many streets and parking garages adjacent to Buffalo Bayou. In the Houston Theater District, also near Buffalo Bayou in the northern part of downtown, the Houston Ballet, Houston Symphony, Houston Grand Opera, and Alley Theater lost millions of dollars' worth of costumes, musical instruments, sheet music, archives, props, and other artifacts.

By midnight on June 9 nearly every freeway and major road in the city was under several feet of water, forcing hundreds of motorists to abandon their vehicles for higher ground. Local television stations ran all-night coverage of the deluge from June 8 through the next day, including KHOU-TV 11, which was forced to transmit its broadcast to a satellite truck when floodwaters entered its production studio on the Allen Parkway near Studemont/Montrose, near downtown along the banks of Buffalo Bayou. By midnight on June 9 nearly every freeway and major road in the city was under several feet of water, forcing hundreds of motorists to abandon their vehicles for higher ground. Eighteen-wheeled trucks were filmed floating down major freeways and highways, swept along by floodwaters.

=== Louisiana ===
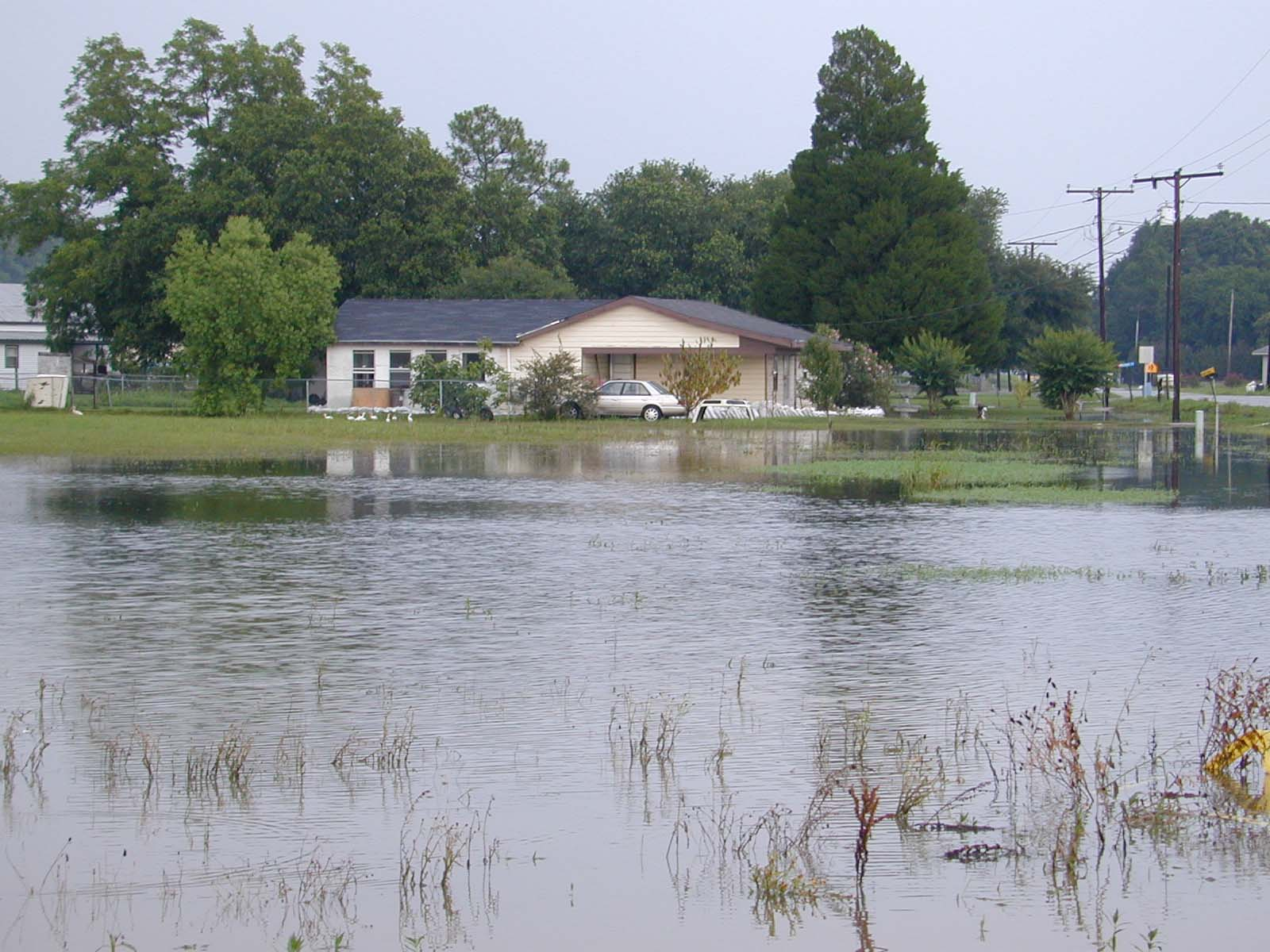
Flooding in Chackbay, Louisiana

While making its first landfall, Allison's large circulation dropped severe rains on southwest Louisiana. Days later, Allison hit the state as a subtropical storm, dropping more heavy rains to the area. Rainfall totals peaked at 29.86 inches (758 mm) in Thibodaux, the highest rainfall total in Louisiana from a tropical cyclone since another Tropical Storm Allison in 1989. Most of the southeastern portion of the state experienced over 10 inches of rain (255 mm). Winds were generally light, peaking at 38 mph (61 km/h) sustained in Lakefront with gusts to 53 mph (85 km/h) in Bay Gardene. The storm produced a storm surge of 2.5 feet (0.76 m) in Cameron as it was making landfall in Texas. While moving northward through Texas, the outer bands of the storm produced an F1 tornado near Zachary, damaging several trees and a power line. A man was killed when a damaged power line hit his truck.

When Allison first made landfall, heavy rainfall flooded numerous houses and businesses. Minor wind gusts caused minor roof damage to 10 houses in Cameron Parish, while its storm surge flooded portions of Louisiana Highway 82. When the system returned, more rainfall occurred, flooding over 1,000 houses in St. Tammany Parish, 80 houses in St. Bernard Parish, and hundreds of houses elsewhere in the state. The flooding also forced 1,800 residents from their homes in East Baton Rouge Parish. The deluge left numerous roads impassable, while runoff resulted in severe river flooding. The Bogue Falaya River in Covington crested past its peak twice to near-record levels. The Amite and Comite Rivers reached their highest levels since 1983. In addition, the levee along the Bayou Manchac broke, flooding roadways and more houses. Damage in Louisiana totaled to $65 million (2001 USD).

=== Southeast United States ===
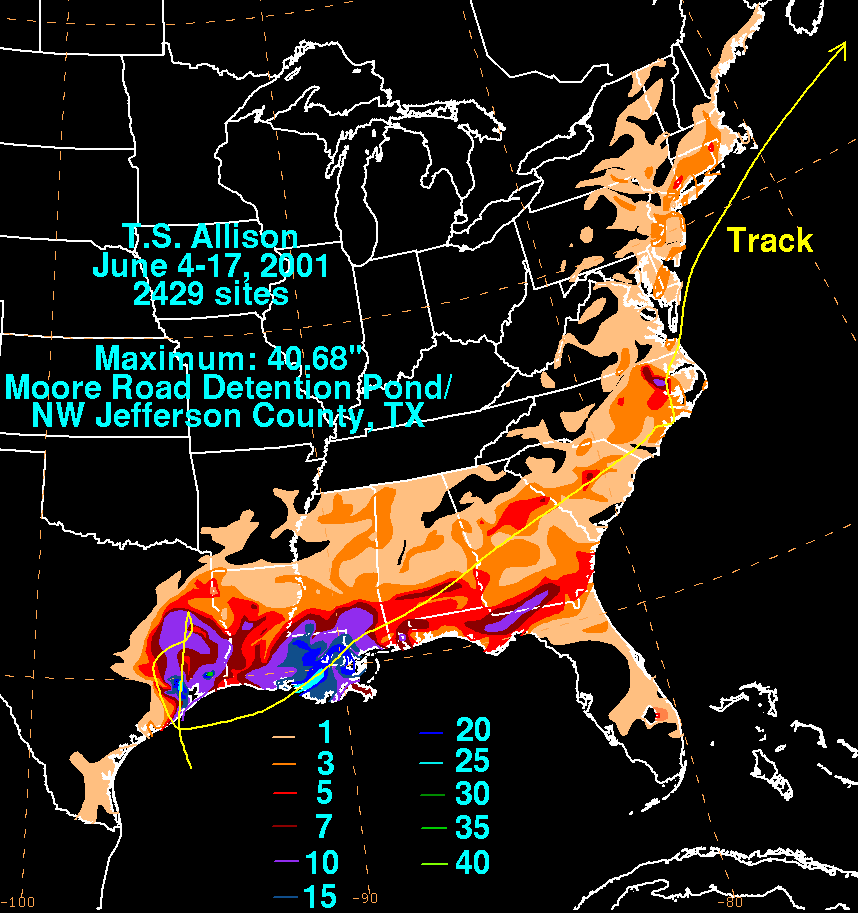
Rainfall totals from Allison

In Mississippi, Allison produced heavy rainfall of over 10 inches (250 mm) in one night, while some areas in the southwestern portion of the state received over 15 inches (380 mm). The flooding damaged numerous houses and flooded many roadways. Thunderstorms from the storm produced four tornadoes, including one in Gulfport, Mississippi that damaged 10 houses. Severe thunderstorms in George County damaged 15 houses, destroyed 10, and injured 5 people. Damage in Mississippi totaled to over $1 million (2001 USD). Rainfall in Alabama was moderate, with areas near Mobile experiencing more than 10 inches (250 mm). Heavy rainfall closed several roads in Crenshaw County. The storm, combined with a high pressure, produced coastal flooding in southern Alabama. Allison produced an F0 tornado in southwest Mobile County that caused minor roof damage and another F0 tornado in Covington County that caused minor damage to six homes and a church.

The storm, combined with a high pressure system, produced a strong pressure gradient, resulting in strong rip currents off the coast of Florida. The currents prompted sirens, which are normally used for storm warnings, to be activated in Pensacola Beach. The rip currents killed 5 off the coast of Florida. Outer rain bands from the storm dropped heavy rainfall across the Florida panhandle of over 11 inches (280 mm) in one day. The Tallahassee Regional Airport recorded 10.13 inches (257 mm) in 24 hours, breaking the old 24‑hour record set in 1969. Throughout the state, Allison destroyed 10 homes and damaged 599, 196 severely, primarily in Leon County. Including the deaths from rip currents, Allison killed eight people in Florida and caused $20 million (2001 USD) in damage.

Over Georgia, the storm dropped heavy rainfall of 10 inches (250 mm) in 24 hours in various locations. The deluge caused rivers to crest past their banks, including the Oconee River at Milledgeville which peaked at 33.7 feet (10.3 m). The rainfall, which was heaviest across the southwestern portion of the state, washed out several bridges and roads, and flooded many other roads. Georgia governor Roy Barnes declared a state of emergency for seven counties in the state. The storm also spawned two tornadoes. In South Carolina, Allison's outer bands produced 10 tornadoes and several funnel clouds, though most only caused minor damage limited to a damaged courthouse, snapped trees and downed power lines. Allison produced from 12 to 16 inches (300 to 410 millimetres) of rainfall in North Carolina, closing nearly all roads in Martin County and damaging 25 homes. The severe flooding washed out a bridge in eastern Halifax County and flooded numerous cars. Wet roads caused nine traffic accidents throughout the state.

=== Mid-Atlantic and Northeast United States ===
In Virginia, Allison produced light rainfall, with the southeastern and south-central portions of the state experiencing over 3 inches (76 mm). A tree in a saturated ground fell over and killed one person. Allison also produced one tornado in the state. Washington, D.C. experienced moderate rainfall from the storm, totaling 2.59 inches (66 mm) in Georgetown. In Maryland, rainfall from Tropical Depression Allison totaled to 7.5 inches (190 mm) in Denton and peak wind gusts of 26 mph (42 km/h) were recorded in Salisbury. In Delaware, the storm produced moderate rainfall, peaking at 4.2 inches (110 mm) in Greenwood. No damage was reported.

Allison, in combination with an approaching frontal boundary, dropped heavy rainfall across southeastern Pennsylvania, peaking at 10.17 inches (258 mm) in Chalfont in Bucks County and over 3 inches (76 mm) in portions of Philadelphia. The rainfall caused rivers to rise, with the Neshaminy Creek in Langhorne peaking at 16.87 feet (5.1 m). Several other rivers and creeks in southeastern Pennsylvania crested at over 10 feet (3.0 m). The rainfall downed numerous weak trees and power lines, leaving 70,000 without power during the storm. The flooding washed out several roads and bridges, including a few SEPTA rail lines. In addition, the rainfall destroyed 241 homes and damaged 1,386 others. Flooding at a Dodge dealership totaled 150 vehicles. Hundreds of people were forced to be rescued from damaged buildings from flood waters. The flooding dislodged a clothes dryer in the basement of the "A" building of the Village Green Apartment Complex in Upper Moreland Township, breaking a natural gas line. The gas leak resulted in an explosion and an ensuing fire that killed six people. Firefighters were unable to render assistance as the building was completely surrounded by floodwaters. Additionally, one man drowned in his vehicle in a river. Damage in Pennsylvania totaled to $215 million (2001 USD).

In New Jersey, the storm produced heavy rainfall, peaking at 8.1 inches (210 mm) in Tuckerton. The rains also caused river flooding, including the north branch of the Metedeconk River in Lakewood which crested at 8 feet (2.4 m). The flooding, severe at places, closed several roads, including numerous state highways. Gusty winds of up to 44 mph (71 km/h) in Atlantic City downed weak trees and power lines, leaving over 13,000 without power. Several people had to be rescued from high waters, though no fatalities occurred in the state. Overall damage was minimal.

Tropical Storm Allison caused flash flooding in New York, dropping up to 3 inches (76 mm) of rain in one hour in several locations and peaking at 5.73 inches (146 mm) in Granite Springs. The rains also caused river flooding, including the Mahwah River which crested at 3.79 feet (1.2 m). Allison's rainfall damaged 24 houses and several stores, while the flooding closed several major highways in the New York City area. Overall damage was light, and no fatalities occurred in New York due to Allison. Similarly, rainfall in Connecticut peaked at 7.2 inches (180 mm) in Pomfret, closing several roads and causing minor damage to numerous houses. The Yantic River at Yantic crested at 11.1 feet (3.4 m), while a state road was closed when a private dam in Hampton failed from the rainfall. In Rhode Island, Allison produced up to 7.1 inches (180 mm) of rainfall in North Smithfield, washing out several roads and houses, and destroying a log house in Foster.

An isolated severe thunderstorm in the outer bands of Allison produced an F1 tornado in Worcester and Middlesex Counties in Massachusetts, impacting over 100 trees and damaging one house and one small camper. A microburst in Leominster and another in Shirley damaged several trees. Lightning from the storm hit two houses, causing significant damage there but little elsewhere. Allison also produced moderate rainfall in the state, mainly ranging from 3 to 5 inches (76 to 127 millimetres). The rainfall caused drainage and traffic problems. Damage in Massachusetts totaled to $400,000 (2001 USD).

== Aftermath ==
Within weeks of the disaster, President George W. Bush declared 75 counties in Texas, southern Louisiana, southern Mississippi, northwestern Florida, and southeastern Pennsylvania as disaster areas. The declarations allowed affected citizens to receive aid for temporary housing, emergency home repairs, and other serious disaster-related expenses. The Federal Emergency Management Agency (FEMA) also provided 75% for the cost of debris removal, emergency services related to the disaster, and repairing or replacing damaged public facilities, such as roads, bridges and utilities.

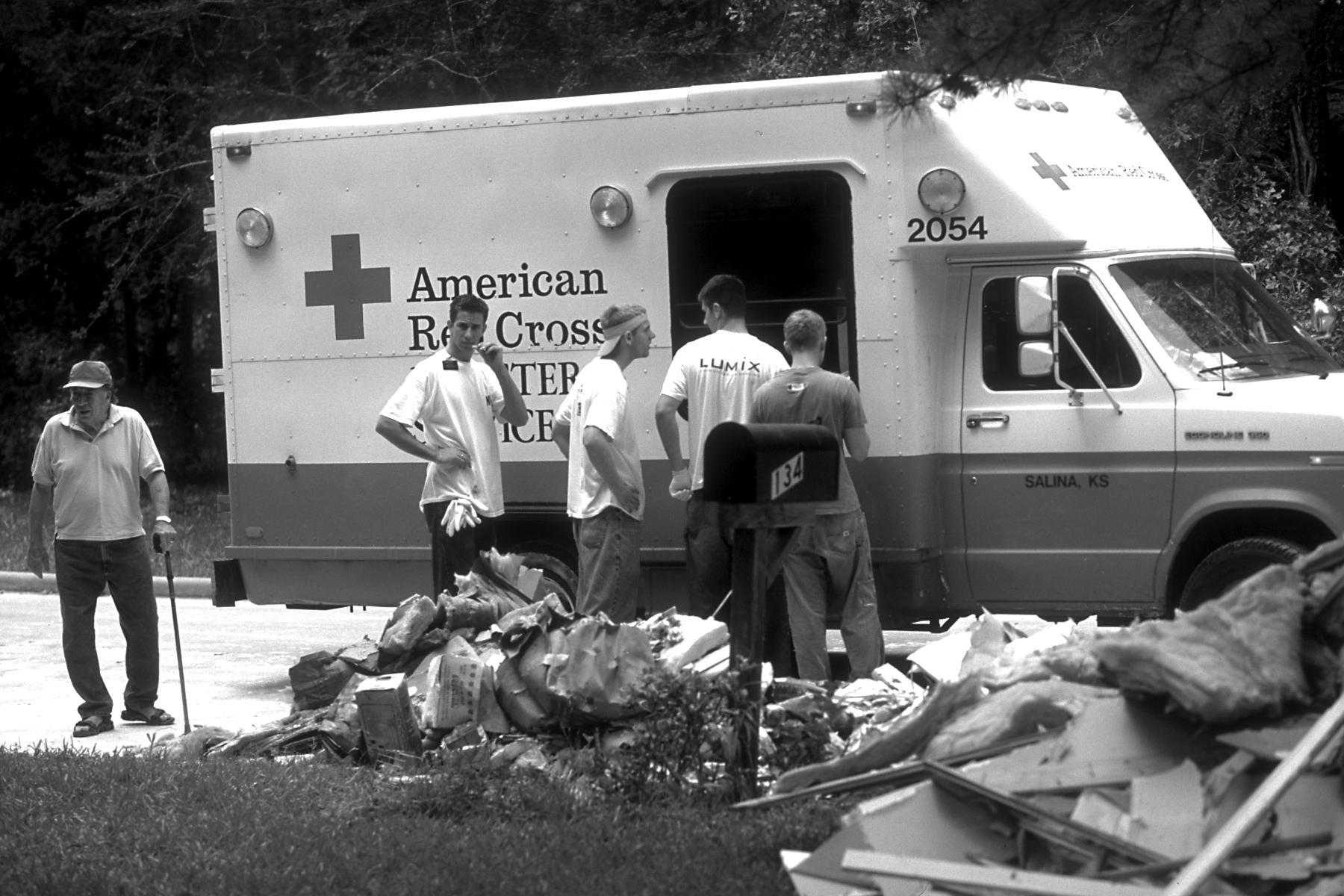
Aid from the American Red Cross

A few weeks after Allison, FEMA opened six disaster recovery centers across southeast Texas, which provided recovery information to those who applied for disaster assistance. The American Red Cross and the Salvation Army opened 48 shelters at the peak of need for people driven from their homes, which served nearly 300,000 meals. After the extensive damage to Houston hospitals, the U. S. Public Health Service team set up a temporary hospital at the Houston Police Academy. The National Disaster Medical System deployed a temporary hospital to Houston with 88 professionals, aiding nearly 500 people. The team of 87 medical personnel served over 1,000 patients within two weeks of Allison's passage. Thirty-five volunteer services provided aid for the flood victims in Texas, including food, clothing, and volunteers to help repair the houses. After nearly 50,000 cars were flooded and ruined, many people attempted to sell the cars across the country without telling of the car's history. Many people took advantage of the flood victims, including fraudulent contractors and suppliers raising the price of goods more than is actually justified. Following the extreme flooding, a mosquito outbreak occurred, though FEMA provided aid to control the problem. By six months after the storm, around 120,000 Texas citizens applied for federal disaster aid, totaling to $1.05 billion (2001 USD).

In a 2006 study on casting blame for natural disasters, Kevin Arcenaux and Robert Stein found that residents of the Houston area were most likely to fault the city government for problems related to Allison, rather than the state or federal government. Indeed, the effects of Allison and its aftermath became an issue during that year's mayoral election. Incumbent Lee P. Brown announced in October that he planned to implement significant improvements to the city's drainage system. Brown's two major opponents, Orlando Sanchez and Chris Bell, accused this announcement of being politically motivated. In particular, Bell stated that "the mayor has known about flooding problems facing the Medical Center for years and done nothing about them... Now, less than 30 days before the election, he suddenly sees it as a priority." Ultimately, Brown won re-election by the narrow margin. Arcenaux and Stein argued that this was partly because "only voters who blamed the city for inadequate flood preparation, rather than some other level of government, were more likely to vote against the incumbent mayor."

FEMA, in conjunction with the Harris County Flood Control District, began a $100 million buyout program later in 2001 to move residents' homes to less flood prone areas. The district identified approximately 2,400 at-risk dwellings and purchased about 1,800 by June 2006, five years after Allison. The district had spent approximately $650 million on other flood control measures by that time, including increasing the size of bayous and raising the height of bridges. A study published shortly before Hurricane Harvey in 2017 argued that the program did not go far enough and that at least 3,300 additional homes should have been eligible for buyout. However, The Texas Tribune noted that even then, thousands more residences would remain within 100-year floodplains. The city of Houston attempted to prevent additional building within floodplains. However, this plan backfired when property values plummeted due to residents being prohibited from modifying their homes. Consequently, several lawsuits ensued and the city council was convinced to remove many of these restrictions around 2008. Furthermore, improvements to the bayous took years longer than expected and some flood control experts even argued that those upgrades would provide little additional protection. Overall, mistakes and setbacks with these programs left Houston vulnerable to another catastrophic flood event, such as Harvey in 2017.

Like in Texas, a mosquito outbreak occurred in Louisiana. Only pesticides acceptable to the US Environmental Protection Agency and the US Fish and Wildlife Service were allowed to be used. FEMA officials warned homeowners of the dangers of floodwaters, including mold, mildew, and bacteria. By three months after the storm, just under 100,000 Louisiana citizens applied for federal aid, totaling to over $110 million (2001 USD). $25 million (2001 USD) of the total was for business loans, while an additional $8 million was for public assistance for communities and state agencies. More than 750 flood victims in Florida applied for governmental aid, totaling to $1.29 million (2001 USD). In Pennsylvania, 1,670 flood victims applied for federal aid, totaling to $11.5 million (2001 USD). $3.4 million (2001 USD) of the total was to replace a SEPTA rail bridge over Sandy Run in Fort Washington.

=== Retirement ===
Due to the severe damage and deaths caused by the storm, the name Allison was retired from future use in the Atlantic basin in the spring of 2002 by the World Meteorological Organization. The name was replaced with Andrea for the 2007 season. Tropical Storm Allison was the first Atlantic tropical storm to have its name retired without reaching hurricane strength.

== See also ==
- 1960 Texas tropical storm
- Tropical Storm Amelia (1978)
- Tropical Storm Claudette (1979)
- Tropical Storm Allison (1989)
- Tropical Storm Alberto (1994)
- Tropical Storm Lee (2011)
- Hurricane Harvey (2017) – another damaging tropical cyclone that stalled over southeastern Texas, flooding the region, and becoming the wettest tropical cyclone recorded in the U.S.
- Tropical Storm Imelda (2019)
- Tropical Storm Claudette (2021)
- List of North Carolina hurricanes (2000–present)
- List of the wettest tropical cyclones in the United States
- Timeline of the 2001 Atlantic hurricane season
