= 2026 Harris County Judge election =

Texas local election

- November 3, 2026
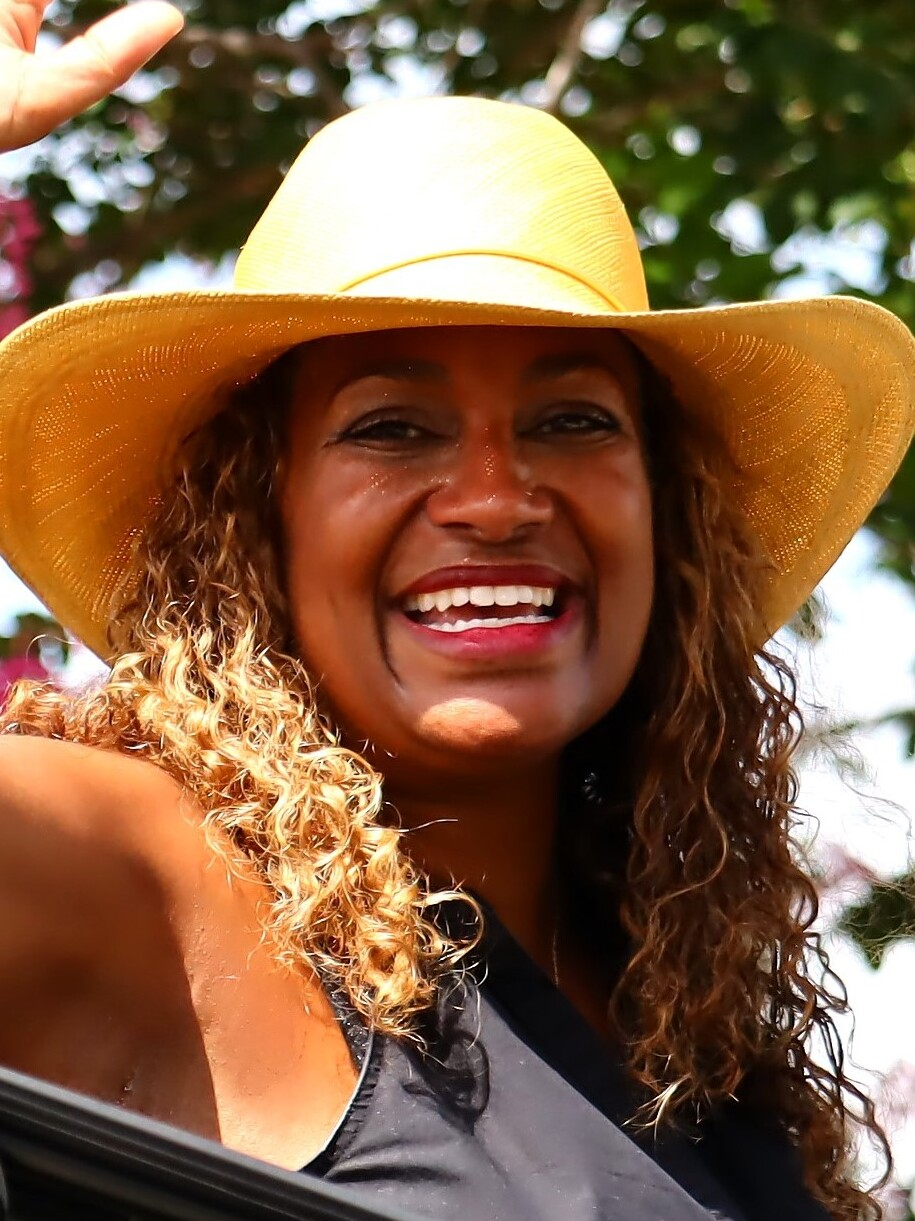

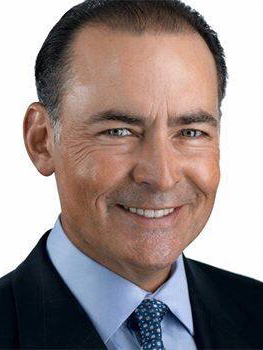
Candidate	Letitia Plummer	Orlando Sanchez
Party	Democratic	Republican
Popular vote	816,215	522,866
Percentage	60.9%	39.0%
county judge before election
Lina Hidalgo
Democratic
Elected county judge
Letitia Plummer
Democratic

The 2026 Harris County Judge election was held on November 3, 2026, to elect the county judge of Harris County, Texas. Primary elections were held on March 3, and a primary runoff election was held on May 26. Incumbent Democratic judge Lina Hidalgo did not run for re-election. Democratic nominee Letitia Plummer defeated Republican Orlando Sanchez by a wide margin.

== Democratic primary ==
=== Candidates ===
==== Nominee ====
- Letitia Plummer, former Houston city councilor for the at-large district (2020–2025), candidate for Texas's 22nd congressional district in 2018, and candidate for Texas's 18th congressional district in 2024

==== Eliminated in runoff ====
- Annise Parker, former mayor of Houston (2010–2016)

==== Eliminated in primary ====
- Matthew Salazar, business owner

==== Withdrawn ====
- Erica Lee Carter, former U.S. representative from Texas's 18th congressional district (2024–2025)

==== Declined ====
- Lina Hidalgo, incumbent judge

=== Endorsements ===
Annise Parker

Local officials

- Adrian Garcia, Harris County commissioner from the 2nd precinct (2019–present)

Labor unions

- UNITE HERE Local 23

Organizations

- LGBTQ Victory Fund

Newspapers

- Houston Chronicle

=== Polling ===
Poll source	Date(s) administered	Sample size (Note: Key: A – all adults RV – registered voters LV – likely voters V – unclear)	Margin of error	Annise Parker	Letitia Plummer	Erica Lee Carter	Matt Salazar	Undecided
University of Houston	February 3–10, 2026	2,000 (LV)	± 2.19%	46%	25%	–	5%	24%
	September 18, 2025	Carter withdraws from the race						
Lake Research Partners (D)	July 31 – August 7, 2025	500 (LV)	± 4.4%	53%	15%	9%	–	20%

=== Results ===
Democratic primary
Party	Candidate	Votes	%
Democratic	Annise Parker	156,321	46.65
Democratic	Letitia Plummer	124,936	37.28
Democratic	Matthew Salazar	53,866	16.07
Total votes		335,123	100.00

=== Runoff ===
==== Polling ====
Poll source	Date(s) administered	Sample size	Margin of error	Annise Parker	Letitia Plummer	Undecided
University of Houston	May 5–9, 2026	1,200 (LV)	± 2.83%	54%	36%	10%

==== Results ====
Democratic primary runoff
Party	Candidate	Votes	%
Democratic	Letitia Plummer	57,893	51.10
Democratic	Annise Parker	55,395	48.90
Total votes		113,288	100.00

== Republican primary ==
=== Candidates ===
==== Nominee ====
- Orlando Sanchez, former county treasurer (2007–2018) and candidate for mayor of Houston in 2001 and 2003

==== Eliminated in runoff ====
- Warren Howell, insurance businessman and candidate in 2022

==== Eliminated in primary ====
- Aliza Dutt, mayor of Piney Point Village (2024–present)
- Oscar Gonzales, former sheriff's deputy and candidate in 2022
- Marty Lancton, Houston Professional Fire Fighters Association president
- George Zoes, business owner and candidate in 2022

=== Endorsements ===
Marty Lancton

Statewide officials

- Greg Abbott, governor of Texas (2015–present)
- Dawn Buckingham, land commissioner of Texas (2023–present)

Individuals

- Jim McIngvale, businessman
Orlando Sanchez

Newspapers

- Houston Chronicle

=== Polling ===
Poll source	Date(s) administered	Sample size	Margin of error	Aliza Dutt	Oscar Gonzalez	Warren Howell	Marty Lancton	Orlando Sanchez	George Zoes	Undecided
University of Houston	February 3–10, 2026	2,000 (LV)	± 2.19%	7%	3%	4%	10%	21%	1%	54%

=== Results ===
Republican primary
Party	Candidate	Votes	%
Republican	Orlando Sanchez	47,568	26.46
Republican	Warren Howell	37,376	20.79
Republican	Marty Lancton	36,959	20.56
Republican	Aliza Dutt	33,523	18.65
Republican	Oscar Gonzales	13,407	7.46
Republican	George Zoes	10,913	6.07
Total votes		179,746	100.00

=== Runoff ===
==== Results ====
Republican primary runoff
Party	Candidate	Votes	%
Republican	Orlando Sanchez	85,304	63.34
Republican	Warren Howell	49,367	36.66
Total votes		134,671	100.00

== General election ==
=== Post-primary endorsements ===
Letitia Plummer (D)

Newspapers

- Houston Chronicle

=== Polling ===
Poll source	Date(s) administered	Sample size	Margin of error	Letitia Plummer (D)	Orlando Sanchez (R)	Undecided
University of Houston	October 3–8, 2026	2,750 (LV)	± 1.9%	47%	40%	13%
HIT Strategies (Note: Poll sponsored by Plummer's campaign)	August 2026	600 (LV)	± 4.0%	53%	37%	10%

=== Results ===
2026 Harris County Judge election
Party	Candidate	Votes	%
Democratic	Letitia Plummer	816,215	60.94
Republican	Orlando Sanchez	522,866	39.04
Independent	Marianne "Yan" Hess (write-in)	157	0.01
Independent	Vince Duncan (write-in)	146	0.01
Total votes		1,339,384	100.00
