= 1995 Houston elections =

The 1995 Houston elections took place on November 7, 1995, and December 9, 1995. All City Council posts, the City Controller, and the Mayor all had elections. All positions were non-partisan.

Results taken from the archives of the Office of the City Secretary of the City of Houston .

== Mayor ==
See 1995 Houston mayoral election

== Mayoral race ==
The 1995 Houston mayoral election was an election with Incumbent Bob Lanier being re-elected to a third term with 82% of the vote.

1995 Houston mayoral election
Party	Candidate	Votes	%	±%
none	Bob Lanier	104,222	82.66%	
none	Dave Wilson	11,403	9.05%	
none	Elizabeth Spates	10,456	8.29%	

== City Controller ==
The 1995 Houston City Controller election was won by Lloyd E. Kelley with 53% of the vote.

1995 Houston City Controller election
Party	Candidate	Votes	%	±%
none	Lloyd E. Kelley	58,048	53.35%	
none	Mark Lee	35,397	32.54%	
none	R. Garry Palmer	15,353	14.11%	

== City Council At-large 1 ==
In the 1995 Houston City Council At-large 1 election, Gracie Guzman Saenz was elected with 100% of the vote.

1995 Houston City Council At-large 1 election
Party	Candidate	Votes	%	±%
none	Gracie Guzman Saenz	87,066	100%	

== City Council At-large 2 ==
In the 1995 Houston City Council At-large 2 election, Joe Roach was elected over opponents Gladys Marie House and Marilu Rumfolo.

1995 Houston City Council At-large 2 election
Party	Candidate	Votes	%	±%
none	Joe Roach	83,641	73.35%	
none	Gladys Marie House	20,439	17.92%	
none	Marilu Rumfolo	9956	8.73%	

== City Council At-large 3 ==
Many candidates dove into a crowded election, the top two, Orlando Sanchez and David Ballard, then ran in the run-off. A naturalized citizen, Sanchez made political history as the first Latino immigrant to be elected to a citywide position in Houston, when he won the at-large seat on the city council.

1995 Houston City Council At-large 3 special election
Party	Candidate	Votes	%	±%
none	Orlando Sanchez (politician)	24,352	25.06%	
none	David Ballard	14,868	15.30%	
none	Chris Bell	13,772	14.17%	
none	Michael "Griff" Griffin	10,978	11.31%	
none	Cynthia Kay Drabek	7,374	7.59%	
none	Sally London Green	7,015	7.22%	
none	Sylvia Kipperman Ayres	5,791	5.96%	
none	Edward (Ed) Small	3,807	3.92%	
none	James B. Neal	3,323	3.42%	
none	Phil Welch	3,296	3.39%	
none	Harold "Oilman" Eide	2,585	2.66%	

== City Council At-large 4 ==
In the 1995 Houston City Council At-large 4 election, John W. Peavy Jr. was elected with 76% of the votes.

1995 Houston City Council At-large 4 election
Party	Candidate	Votes	%	±%
none	John W. Peavy Jr.	80,900	76.75%	
none	Alfredo Santos	24,503	23.25%	

== City Council At-large 5 ==
In the 1995 Houston City Council At-large 5 election, Judson W. Robinson was elected to an at-large position.

1995 Houston City Council At-large 5 election
Party	Candidate	Votes	%	±%
none	Judson W. Robinson	70,479	28%	
none	Robert R. (Randy) Sims Jr.	26,883	25.18%	
none	Sam "Texas" Fayad	9,402	8.81%	

== City Council District A ==
In the 1995 Houston City Council District A election, Helen Huey was elected with 74% of the vote.

1995 Houston City Council District A election
Party	Candidate	Votes	%	±%
none	Helen Huey	10,075	73.95%	
none	Will Archer	3,549	26.05%	

== City Council District B ==
In the 1995 Houston City Council District B election, Jarvis Johnson was re-elected to a second term.

1995 Houston City Council District B election
Party	Candidate	Votes	%	±%
none	Michael Yarbrough	8,177	66.24%	
none	Ricky E. Bailey	2,729	22.11%	
none	Etheal Lewis	836	6.77%	
none	William (Bill) Butler	602	4.88%	

== City Council District C ==
In the 1995 Houston City Council District C election, Martha J. Wong was elected.

1995 Houston City Council District C election
Party	Candidate	Votes	%	±%
none	Martha J. Wong	13,574	84.85%	
none	Donald Murphy Guillory	2,423	15.15%	

== City Council District D ==
In the 1995 Houston City Council District D election, Wanda Adams was elected after a run-off.

1995 Houston City Council District D election
Party	Candidate	Votes	%	±%
none	Jew Don Boney	7,248	39.83%	
none	Saundria Chase Gray	5,970	32.81%	
none	May Walker	1,667	9.16%	
none	Cleveland Gite	960	5.27%	
none	George Dillard	946	5.20%	
none	Sylvia Livingston Terry	412	2.26%	

== City Council District E ==
In the Houston City Council District E election, Rob Todd was elected after a run-off.

1995 Houston City Council District E election
Party	Candidate	Votes	%	±%
none	Rob Todd	2,624	18.75%	
none	Andrew C. Burks Jr.	2,389	17.07%	
none	Gregg R. Stephens	2,378	16.99%	
none	Danny Perkins	2,369	16.93%	

1995 Houston City Council District E run-off election
Party	Candidate	Votes	%	±%
none	Rob Todd	4,387	63.20%	
none	Andrew C. Burks Jr.	2,554	36.80%	

== City Council District F ==
In the 1995 Houston City Council District F election, Ray F. Driscoll was election.

1995 Houston City Council District F election
Party	Candidate	Votes	%	±%
none	Ray F. Driscoll	4,316	62.63%	
none	Don Clover	2,575	37.37%	

== City Council District G ==
In the 1995 Houston City Council District G election, John Kelley was elected to a third term with 100% of the vote.

1995 Houston City Council District G election
Party	Candidate	Votes	%	±%
none	John Kelley	12,450	100%	

== City Council District H ==
In the 1995 Houston City Council District H election, Felix Fraga was elected with 71% of the vote.

1995 Houston City Council District H election
Party	Candidate	Votes	%	±%
none	Felix Fraga	6,661	70.98%	
none	Daphne Brown	1,961	20.90%	
none	Bob Turley	762	8.12%	

== City Council District I ==
In the 1995 Houston City Council District I election, John E. Costillo was elected as council member.

1995 Houston City Council District I election
Party	Candidate	Votes	%	±%
none	John E. Castillo	4,771	55.34%	
none	Luciano Salinas Jr.	2,237	25.95%	
none	W. R. Morris	1,269	14.72%	
