= 2015 Houston mayoral election =

- November 3, 2015 (first round); December 12, 2015 (runoff)
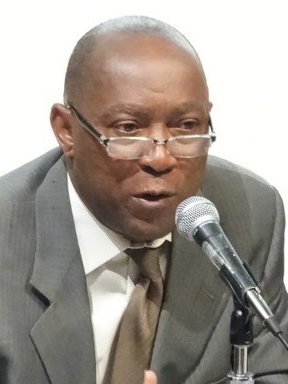

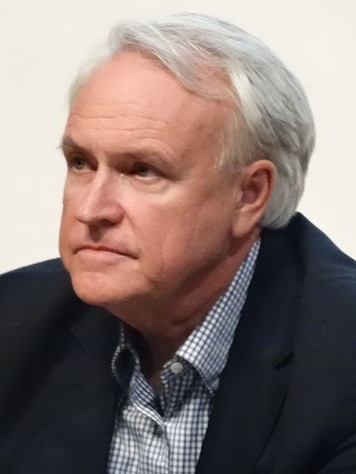

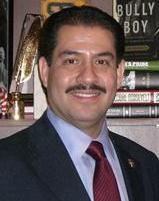

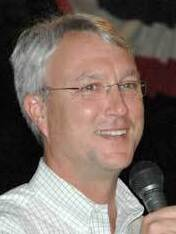
| Candidate | Sylvester Turner | Bill King | Adrian Garcia |
| First round | 81,735; 31.31% | 65,968; 25.27% | 44,758; 17.14% |
| Runoff | 108,389; 50.96% | 104,307; 49.04% | Eliminated |
| Candidate | Ben Hall | Chris Bell | Steve Costello |
| First round | 24,805; 9.50% | 19,345; 7.41% | 17,546; 6.72% |
| Runoff | Eliminated | Eliminated | Eliminated |
Mayor before election
Annise Parker
Elected mayor
Sylvester Turner

The 2015 Houston mayoral election was decided by a runoff that took place on December 12, 2015, to elect the Mayor of Houston, Texas. As no candidate won a majority of the vote during the general election on November 3, 2015, the run off was held between the top two finishers, Sylvester Turner, who received 31.31% of the vote, and Bill King, who received 25.27%. In the run-off, Turner edged King, 51% to 49%, to become the 62nd Mayor of Houston.

Thirteen candidates appeared on the November ballot. A poll of likely voters conducted in June revealed that half of the city's likely voters were undecided, and that three of the candidates included in the poll, Sylvester Turner, Adrian Garcia and Chris Bell (all of whom were Democrats) were within the margin of error of the top two spots. However, the final results were significantly different from the early polling, with Independent King claiming the second runoff spot along with Turner.

Mayoral elections in Houston are biennial, with the winner being sworn in in the following January for a four-year term. The election is officially nonpartisan, although the political parties still support and endorse candidates.

With the passage of voter-approved Proposition 2, the Mayor began a four-year term effective in January 2016.

Incumbent Mayor Annise Parker, a member of the Democratic Party who had been in office since 2010, was term-limited and could not run for re-election to a fourth term in office.

During the month between the general election and the runoff, Bell endorsed King, while Parker and Garcia, as well as then-U.S. President Barack Obama, endorsed Turner.

A referendum was approved by voters in November which lengthened the mayoral term (beginning with the term up for election) from two years to four years. The referendum altered term limits from three 2-year terms to two 4-year terms.

== Candidates ==
=== Declared ===
- Chris Bell, former U.S. Representative, former Houston City Council member, candidate for Mayor in 2001 and nominee for Governor of Texas in 2006
- Bill King, attorney and former Mayor of Kemah
- Ben Hall, attorney, former Houston City Attorney and candidate for Mayor in 2013
- Sylvester Turner, State Representative and candidate for Mayor in 1991 and 2003
- Adrian Garcia, former Harris County Sheriff and former Houston City Councilmember
- Marty McVey, private equity executive
- Andrew Wood, ISA
- Stephen Costello, Houston City Councilmember

=== Withdrawn ===
- Oliver Pennington, Houston City Councilmember

=== Declined ===
- Clarence Bradford, Houston City Councilmember and former Chief of the Houston Police Department
- Chris Brown, Chief Deputy Houston City Controller (running for Controller)
- Bun B., rapper and political activist
- Jack Christie, Houston City Councilmember
- David Dewhurst, former Lieutenant Governor of Texas and candidate for the U.S. Senate in 2012
- Bill Frazer, candidate for Houston City Controller in 2013 (running for Controller)
- Michael Kubosh, Houston City Councilmember
- Laura Murillo, President and CEO of the Houston Hispanic Chamber of Commerce

=== Polling ===
| Poll source | Date(s) | Sample size | Margin of error | Stephen Costello | Bill King | Sylvester Turner | Adrian Garcia | Chris Bell | Marty McVey | Ben Hall | Don't Know | Refused |
|---|---|---|---|---|---|---|---|---|---|---|---|---|
| UH Center for Public Policy & Rice University | 5/20 - 6/21 | 500 | ± 4.5% | 2% | 2% | 16% | 12% | 8% | 0% | 3% | 50% | 6% |

=== General election ===
Held November 3, 2015 -- 50% needed to avoid runoff

Houston mayoral election, 2015
| Candidate | | Votes | % | ± |
|---|---|---|---|---|
| ✓ | Sylvester Turner | 81,735 | 31.31% | Runoff |
| ✓ | Bill King | 65,968 | 25.27% | Runoff |
| | Adrian Garcia | 44,758 | 17.14% | |
| | Ben Hall | 24,805 | 9.50% | |
| | Chris Bell | 19,345 | 7.41% | |
| | Steve Costello | 17,546 | 6.72% | |
| | Hoc Thai Nguyen | 2,325 | 0.89% | |
| | Marty McVey | 1,378 | 0.53% | |
| | Demetria Smith | 1,234 | 0.47% | |
| | Victoria A Lane | 908 | 0.35% | |
| | Rafael Muñoz Jr. | 515 | 0.20% | |
| | Dale Steffes | 302 | 0.12% | |
| | Joe Ferreira | 240 | 0.09% | |
| Total votes | | 261,059 | 100% | |
| Turnout | | | 26.66% | |

Held December 12, 2015

Houston mayoral runoff election, 2015
| Candidate | | Votes | % | ± |
|---|---|---|---|---|
| ✓ | Sylvester Turner | 108,389 | 51% | +19% |
| | Bill King | 104,307 | 49% | +24% |
| Turnout | | 212,696 | 100% | |

| District | Turner % | Turner votes | King % | King votes |
|---|---|---|---|---|
| District A | 36.63% | 5,493 | 63.37% | 9,500 |
| District B | 92.75% | 17,413 | 7.25% | 1,361 |
| District C | 44.62% | 16,005 | 55.38% | 19,865 |
| District D | 85.74% | 20,246 | 14.26% | 3,368 |
| District E | 21.78% | 5,600 | 78.22% | 20,110 |
| District F | 46.21% | 4,008 | 53.79% | 4,665 |
| District G | 19.64% | 6,893 | 80.36% | 28,194 |
| District H | 64.30% | 7,355 | 35.70% | 4,084 |
| District I | 62.05% | 5,895 | 37.95% | 3,606 |
| District J | 46.89% | 3,013 | 53.11% | 3,414 |
| District K | 68.71% | 12,718 | 31.29% | 5,792 |
| Montgomery County | 24.18% | 22 | 75.82% | 70 |
| Fort Bend County | 93.08% | 3,728 | 6.92% | 278 |

== See also ==
- Politics of Houston
- Houston City Council
