= Mike Knox (disambiguation) =

Mike Knox may refer to:

- Mike Knox (born 1978), American professional wrestler
- Mike Knox (American football) (born 1962), American football player
- Mike Knox (politician), American politician
