= 1991 Houston mayoral election =

- November 5, 1991 (first round); December 7, 1991 (runoff)
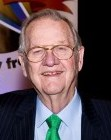

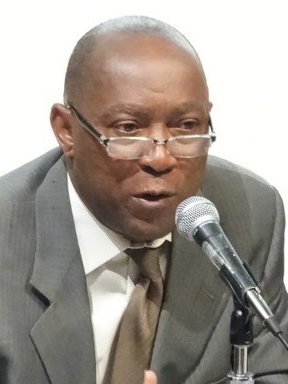

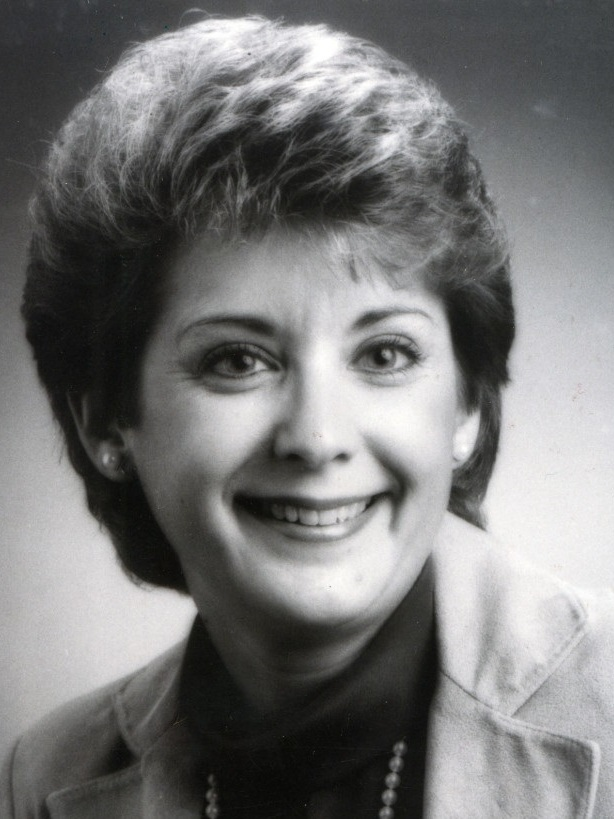
Candidate	Bob Lanier	Sylvester Turner	Kathy Whitmire
First round	138,096; 43.8%	113,782; 36.1%	63,613; 20.2%
Runoff	152,792; 53.1%	135,173; 46.9%	Eliminated
Mayor before election
Kathy Whitmire
Elected mayor
Bob Lanier

The 1991 Houston mayoral election took place on November 5, 1991. The race was officially non-partisan. Bob Lanier defeated five term incumbent mayor Kathy Whitmire. A run-off election was held on December 7, 1991.

Most white voters of all economic levels voted for Lanier. His strongest tallies came from affluent neighborhoods like River Oaks, Meyerland, Uptown, Memorial and Sharpstown; in those areas he won with 60 to 65 percent or more of the vote. Lanier won 75 percent of the votes in his home Houston precinct. In racially mixed areas such as Westbury and Alief, Lanier had the majority of votes with his main opponent, Sylvester Turner, having finished in a close second place. Lanier did not win in Montrose and many African-American neighborhoods.

== Candidates ==
- Incumbent Mayor Kathy Whitmire
- Businessman and real estate developer Bob Lanier
- State Representative Sylvester Turner

== Results ==
Houston mayoral election, General Election 1991
Party	Candidate	Votes	%
Nonpartisan	Bob Lanier	138,096	43.77
Nonpartisan	Sylvester Turner	113,782	36.07
Nonpartisan	Kathy Whitmire (incumbent)	63,613	20.16
Nonpartisan	Willie M. Reid	787	0.24
Total votes		315,491	100.00

Houston mayoral election, 1991 Runoff
Party	Candidate	Votes	%
Nonpartisan	Bob Lanier	152,792	53.06
Nonpartisan	Sylvester Turner	135,173	46.94
Total votes		287,965	100.00

Turner would later campaign in 2003 but took third place. He won the mayoral runoff on December 12, 2015.
