= 1993 Houston mayoral election =

- November 2, 1993
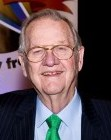

Nominee	Bob Lanier	Brian Bowen
Popular vote	169,752	9,705
Percentage	91%	5%
Mayor before election
Bob Lanier
Elected mayor
Bob Lanier

The 1993 Houston mayoral election took place on November 2, 1993. The race was officially non-partisan. Incumbent mayor Bob Lanier was re-elected to a second term.

== Candidates ==
- Incumbent Mayor Bob Lanier
- Brian Bowen
- Luis Ullrich
- Jerry Freiwirth
- James Partsch-Galvan

== Results ==
Houston mayoral election, 1993
Candidate	Votes	%
Bob Lanier (incumbent)	169,752	91%
Brian Bowen	9,705	5%
Luis Ullrich	4,613	3%
Jerry Freiwirth	2,713	2%
