= 1995 Houston mayoral election =

- November 7, 1995
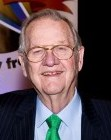

Nominee	Bob Lanier	Dave Wilson	Elizabeth Spates
Popular vote	104,222	11,403	10,456
Percentage	83%	9%	8%
Mayor before election
Bob Lanier
Elected mayor
Bob Lanier

The 1995 Houston mayoral election took place on November 7, 1995. The race was officially non-partisan. Incumbent mayor Bob Lanier was re-elected to a third term.

Incumbent, Bob Lanier, won his bid for a third term as mayor of Houston in a landslide, easily defeating Dave Wilson and Elizabeth Spates, who was the first black woman to run for mayor of Houston.

== Candidates ==
- Incumbent Mayor Bob Lanier, real estate developer
- Dave Wilson, sign company owner
- Elizabeth Spates, Houston school trustee

== Results ==
Houston mayoral election, 1995
Candidate	Votes	%
Bob Lanier (incumbent)	104,222	83%
Dave Wilson	11,403	9%
Elizabeth Spates	10,456	8%
