= Bob Lanier (politician) =

American politician (1925–2014)

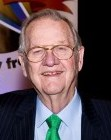
- Lanier in 2008

58th Mayor of Houston
- In office January 2, 1992 – January 2, 1998
- Preceded by: Kathryn Whitmire
- Succeeded by: Lee Brown

Personal details
- Born: Robert Clayton Lanier; March 10, 1925 Baytown, Texas, U.S.
- Died: December 20, 2014 (aged 89) Houston, Texas, U.S.
- Resting place: Memorial Oaks Cemetery, Houston, Texas, U.S.
- Party: Democratic
- Spouse(s): Elizabeth Lanier, Elyse Lanier
- Relations: Christopher Sarofim (son-in-law)
- Children: 5
- Education: University of Texas
- Profession: Banker, lawyer, real estate developer

Military service
- Branch/service: United States Navy
- Battles/wars: World War II

Robert Clayton Lanier (March 10, 1925 – December 20, 2014) was an American businessman and politician who served as mayor of Houston, Texas, from 1992 to 1998. Before becoming mayor, Lanier had a notable career as a lawyer, banker, and real estate developer. He also held significant public service positions, including chairman of the Texas Highway Commission and chairman of the Metropolitan Transit Authority of Harris County (METRO). As mayor, he focused on improving infrastructure, public safety, and the city’s diversity. Lanier was re-elected in 1993 and 1995, and after leaving office, remained active in real estate and public policy. At the time of his death, he was the oldest living former mayor of Houston.

== Background ==
Robert Clayton Lanier was born on March 10, 1925, and grew up in the oil-patch suburb of Baytown, Texas. He served in the Navy in World War II and graduated from the University of New Mexico. He earned his law degree from the University of Texas, then practiced law at the powerful Houston firm Baker & Botts for a decade before switching to banking and ultimately becoming a major real estate developer.

Before he was elected mayor, he was the chairman of the Texas Highway Commission. He later headed the annual Lanier Public Policy Conference at the University of Houston.

Mr. Lanier underwent triple-bypass surgery in 1998, three months after suffering a mild heart attack. In 2006 he collapsed at the memorial service for Kenneth L. Lay, the convicted founder of the Enron Corporation, and was taken to the hospital.

Mr. Lanier was married three times. According to a Houston funeral home, his survivors include his wife, Elyse; five sons; three daughters; and 11 grandchildren.

== Political career ==
In 1983, Governor Mark White appointed Lanier to the Texas Highway Commission, where he served as chairman until 1987. He oversaw a $2.5 billion budget and directed the construction, maintenance and operation of the state's highway system. During this period, Lanier became an outspoken critic of a plan by Houston's Mayor Kathy Whitmire and METRO, Houston’s public transit authority, to build a monorail system.

In April 1988, as part of a compromise with rail advocates, Whitmire appointed Lanier as chairman of Metro. As chairman, Lanier accused Metro staff of hiding studies that showed ridership of a rail system would be less than originally predicted and not as economically viable. Lanier resigned in December 1989 after learning Whitmire would not reappoint him because of his lack of commitment to building a rail system.

Lanier spent months searching for a politician who could knock the 5-term Mayor Whitmire out of office, but he eventually decided to do it himself. In the 1991 Houston Mayoral election, Lanier challenged Whitmire and won on the promise of putting more police on the streets, abandoning the METRO rail plan, and diverting transit funds into paving roads and sidewalks. Lanier was reelected in 1993 and 1995. Term limits prevented his candidacy in 1997, enacted in 1991 and reinforced in 1994 by a grass-roots citizen initiative spearheaded by the conservative political activist Clymer Wright. As mayor, he was affectionately referred to as "Mayor Bob."

As mayor, Lanier’s actions were guided by three core values:

- That Houston should capitalize on its diversity
- That his administration had to improve the city’s infrastructure, particularly the inner city, and bring it to the level of the more affluent suburbs.
- That public safety should be improved.

== Roles after being mayor ==
Lanier was a founding member of Houston Community College, which he continued to support until the end of his life.

Mayor Lanier also headed the corporation that oversaw construction of the city's new Hilton Americas – Houston, the city’s first convention center hotel – a project that started during his administration.

Until his death in 2014, Lanier continued to manage his real estate properties, lectured several times a year, oversaw the Lanier Public Policy Conferences at the University of Houston and participated in various civic, academic and political activities.

== Awards and honors ==
=== Bob Lanier Public Works Building ===
The Bob Lanier Public Works Building, located in downtown Houston, was originally known as the "Electric Building". Completed in 1968, it had been the headquarters of electricity provider, Houston Lighting and Power (HL&P). In 1999, the City of Houston acquired the building and renovated it to house various city government office, including the Public Work and Engineering Department, and the Planning Department. The Houston City Council voted to rename the renovated building in honor of former mayor (1992-1998) Bob Lanier.

=== Civil rights awards ===
The Texas NAACP presented him its Texas Hero award.

In 1998, he was recognized with thee Hubert Humphrey Civil Rights Award. The award recognized his work as chairman of the "Rebuild America Coalition", his "Neighborhood to Standard" (NTS) program (which revitalized neighborhoods in downtown Houston), and his stance against an anti-affirmative action ballot initiative.

=== Leadership awards ===
In 2000, he received the Leadership Houston Distinguished Service Award and the Urban Beautification Award from the American Horticultural Society.

In 2002 he was inducted into the Texas Transportation Institute's Hall of Honor at Texas A&M University.

In August 2007, he was also inducted into the Houston Hall of Fame.

His work in transportation earned him the National Auto Dealers' Award. His work in finance brought a Bond Market Association Award.

== Death ==
Lanier died on December 20, 2014, at the age of 89 from natural causes. He was survived by his wife of 30 years, Elyse, his 4 sons, 3 daughter, and his 11 grandchildren. He was preceded in death by his parents and former wife, Elizabeth Grant Lanier. At the time of his death, he was the oldest living former mayor of Houston, marking the end of a significant chapter in the city’s political and business history.

Political offices
Preceded by Kathy Whitmire	Mayor of Houston; 1992–1998	Succeeded by Lee Brown
