= Mike Knox (politician) =

American politician

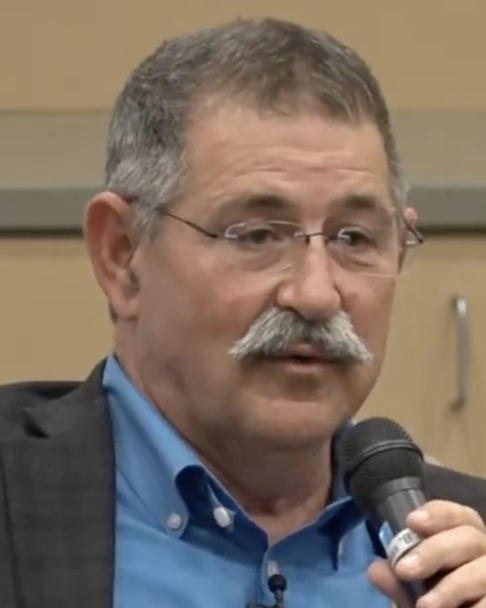

Member of Houston City Council for At-Large Position 1
- Incumbent
- Assumed office January 2, 2016
- Preceded by: Stephen Costello

Personal details
- Born: Houston, Texas, U.S.
- Party: Republican
- Spouse: Helen Knox (m. 1977)
- Children: 1
- Education: Houston Community College (AA); University of Houston-Downtown (BS)

Military service
- Allegiance: United States
- Branch/service: United States Air Force

Mike Knox is a Houston politician who serves on the Houston City Council representing At-Large Position 1.

== Personal life ==
Knox was born in Houston, Texas. He has been married to his high school sweetheart, Helen Knox, since 1977. Together, they have one son. His son, Officer Jason Knox, was a Houston Police officer who died in the line of duty on May 2, 2020, in a police helicopter crash. Knox has an associate art degree from Houston Community College, and a Bachelor of Science from the University of Houston-Downtown. He obtained his degrees while working as a Houston Police officer. He is a veteran of the United States Air Force and served 15 years on the Houston Police force. In 1995, he published Gangsta in the House; Understanding Gang Culture which is a book that focuses on gang culture, and the National Gang Research Center recognized it in 2001 with the honorable "Thrasher" award.

== Political career ==
Knox is a Republican. He was first elected to represent At-large Position 1 of the Houston City Council on November 15, 2014, and assumed office on January 2, 2016.

In 2016, Knox fired a staffer who attempted to block a Muslim from being appointed to Harris Republican Party precinct chair.
