= 2001 Houston mayoral election =

- November 6, 2001 (first round); December 1, 2001 (runoff)
- Turnout: 28.65% (first round); 31.28% (runoff)
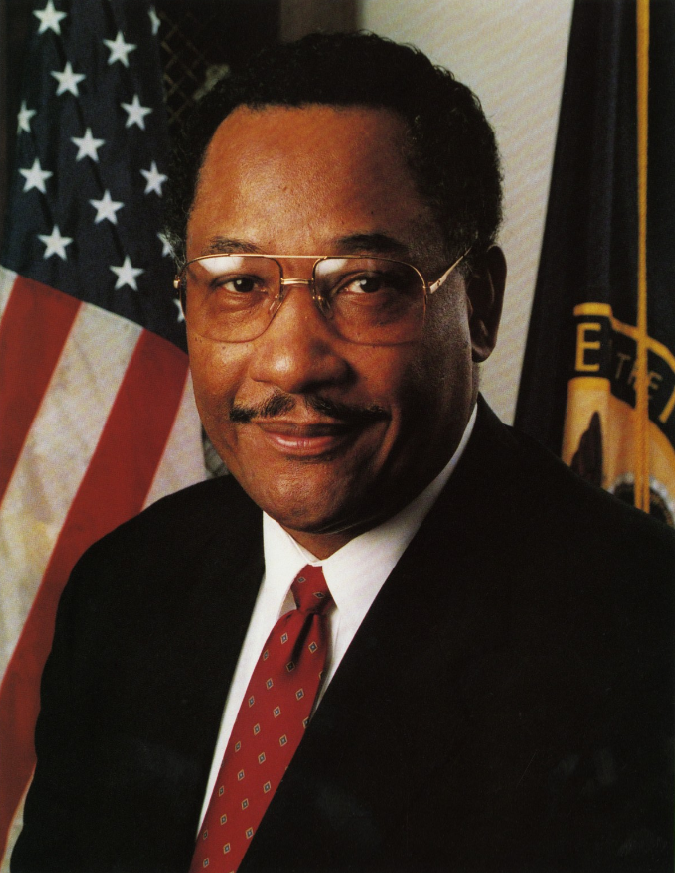

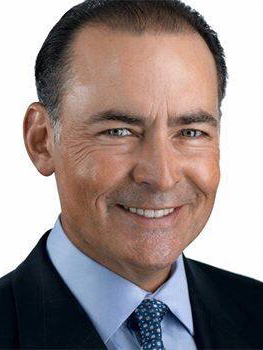

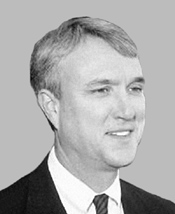
Candidate	Lee P. Brown	Orlando Sanchez	Chris Bell
Party	Nonpartisan	Nonpartisan	Nonpartisan
First round	125,282; 43.46%	115,967; 40.23%	45,739; 15.87%
Runoff	165,866; 51.67%	155,164; 48.33%	Eliminated
Mayor of Houston before election
Lee P. Brown
Elected Mayor of Houston
Lee P. Brown

The 2001 Houston mayoral election took place on November 6, 2001. Incumbent Mayor Lee Brown was re-elected to a third term. Officially the race was non-partisan. None of the candidates received a majority of the votes, so a run-off election was held on December 1, 2001.

== Background ==
Lee P. Brown was elected mayor of Houston, the first black person to do so, in 1997, and was reelected in 1999. Brown announced that he would seek reelection to a third term, the maximum allowed due to term limits, on August 26, 2001.

== Campaign ==
- Chris Bell, member of the Houston City Council (Democratic)
- Lee P. Brown, Mayor of Houston (Democratic)
- Larry DeVoy, electrician
- Anthony Dutrow, Socialist Workers Party candidate in Utah's 3rd congressional district in 1990 election
- Orlando Sanchez, member of the Houston City Council (Republican)
- Luis Ullrich, plumber

City controller Sylvia Garcia and city councilor Carroll Robinson considered running.

The mayoral election is formally nonpartisan, but Brown and Chris Bell were aligned with the Democratic Party while Orlando Sanchez was aligned with the Republican Party. A forum was held at Kingwood College on October 2, and televised debate was hosted on October 10.

Brown was accused of causing the death of a fire captain due to the city's policy of three people per fire truck rather than the standard four. Brown proposed a $16 million expansion to the fire department's budget after the incident, but Sanchez attacked it as a "self-serving, despicable and cynical act". Bell's wife received a fake anthrax letter. Brown and Sanchez also reported receiving suspicious mail.

The Democratic National Committee spent $75,000 to aid Brown and DNC chair Terry McAuliffe campaigned for him. The Republican National Committee donated $15,000 to Sanchez's campaign. Elaine Chao and Mel Martínez, members of President George W. Bush's cabinet, campaigned for Sanchez. 60% of Hispanic voters supported Sanchez in the initial election.

== Endorsements ==
Lee Brown endorsements

State officials

- Mario Gallegos Jr., member of the Texas Senate from the 6th district

Local officials

- Chris Bell, member of the Houston City Council and mayoral candidate (runoff)

Individuals

- Kenneth Lay, CEO of Enron
Orlando Sanchez endorsements

Federal officials

- George H. W. Bush, 41st President of the United States

== Polling ==
Poll source	Date(s) administered	Sample size	Margin of error	Lee Brown	Orlando Sanchez	Chris Bell	Other / Undecided
Houston Chronicle; KHOU	September 5–10; 20–26 (Note: Polling was suspended due to the September 11 attacks)	792 RV	±	36%	19%	15%	30%

== Results ==
Candidate	Party	First round		Second round	
Candidate	Party	Votes	%	Votes	%
Lee P. Brown	Nonpartisan	125,282	43.46	165,866	51.67
Orlando Sanchez	Nonpartisan	115,967	40.23	155,164	48.33
Chris Bell	Nonpartisan	45,739	15.87		
Luis Ullrich	Nonpartisan	572	0.20		
Larry DeVoy	Nonpartisan	488	0.17		
Anthony Dutrow	Nonpartisan	235	0.08		
Total		288,283	100.00	321,030	100.00
Valid votes		288,283	100.00	321,030	100.00
Invalid votes		0	0.00	0	0.00
Blank votes		0	0.00	0	0.00
Total votes		288,283	100.00	321,030	100.00
Registered voters/turnout		1,006,301	28.65	1,026,404	31.28

== Works cited ==
- City of Houston General Election Harris, Fort Bend and Montgomery Counties Combined November 6, 2001 (PDF). Houston. 2001.
- City of Houston General Election Harris, Fort Bend and Montgomery Counties Combined December 1, 2001 (PDF). Houston. 2001.
