= Orlando Sanchez (politician) =

American politician

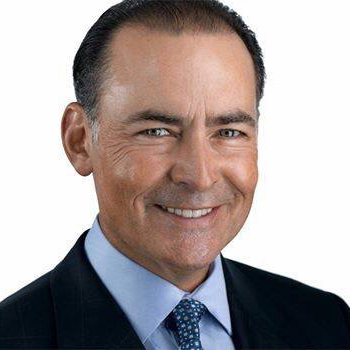
- Sanchez in 2014

Treasurer of Harris County
- In office January 1, 2007 – December 31, 2018
- Preceded by: Jack Cato
- Succeeded by: Dylan Osborne

Member of the Houston City Council from the at-large district Position 3
- In office January, 1996 – January 2001
- Preceded by: Lloyd Kelley
- Succeeded by: Shelley Sekula-Gibbs

Personal details
- Born: October 14, 1957 (age 68) Havana, Cuba
- Party: Republican
- Education: University of Houston (BA)

Military service
- Branch/service: United States Air Force
- Years of service: 1976–1978 (active); 1978–1989 (guard)
- Unit: Texas Air National Guard

Orlando Sanchez (born October 14, 1957) is an American politician who served as the treasurer of Harris County, Texas, from 2007 to 2018.

A naturalized US citizen, Sanchez has made political history as the first Latino immigrant to be elected to a citywide position in Houston, when he won the at-large seat on the city council, to which he was twice re-elected in consecutive terms, serving 1995–2001. In 2001 and 2003 he ran for mayor of Houston, gaining an alliance with Republican Anglos and generating high voter turnout in the Hispanic community. Both times he made it to the runoffs. When elected as treasurer of Harris County, he was the first Latino immigrant to win a countywide, non-judicial elected office in that county.

== Early life and education ==
Sanchez was born in Havana, Cuba, to native Cuban parents. His parents emigrated after the Cuban Revolution when he was a young child. The family stayed for a brief time in Venezuela, before settling in Houston in 1962. Sanchez has lived here since. Former Harris County Judge Roy Hofheinz hired Sanchez's father, Orlando Sanchez-Diago, as a broadcaster to be the "Spanish voice" of the Colt .45s baseball club, which subsequently was renamed the Houston Astros.

Sanchez grew up in southwest Houston, where he graduated from Bellaire High School. He joined the U.S. Air Force in 1976. After his tour, he enlisted in the 147th Fighter Interceptor Group of the Texas Air National Guard at the then-named Ellington Field. He attended the University of Houston and graduated cum laude with a degree in political science. In 1997, Sanchez was the University of Houston Social Sciences' Outstanding Young Alum and in 2001 received the Distinguished Alumnus Award.

== Political career ==
Sanchez joined the Republican Party and first ran for office in 1992 as the Republican nominee for district 132 of the Texas House. In 1993 he was a candidate for Houston City Council in district C.

In 1995, Sanchez successfully ran citywide for at-large position on the Houston City Council, where he served three terms, January 1996 to January 2002, stepping down due to term limits. He was the first Latino immigrant to be elected citywide in Houston's history. The Harris County Republican Party awarded Sanchez the 'Political Courage Award' for his vote to cut property taxes in Houston for the first time in decades.

In 2001, Sanchez ran for mayor of the City of Houston against the two-time incumbent Lee P. Brown, the former police chief of the city, and a fellow city councilmember, Chris Bell. Sanchez, who gained 40% of the vote, faced Brown, who had 43%, in a run-off; Chris Bell received 16% of the ballots cast. The centerpiece of Sanchez' campaign was public safety: he called for four fire fighters on each fire truck as the minimum needed to preserve lives and safety of the force, gaining the union's endorsement. On September 11, 2001, fire fighters helping victims in the World Trade Center attacks became national heroes; this helped to elevate the profile of Sanchez' cause. In October 2001, Houston Fire Captain Jay Janhke was killed while putting out a fire. Mayor Brown was strongly criticized and the Fire Department policy changed its policy, staffing four fighters per truck as the standard for each call.

In the non-partisan election, Sanchez developed a coalition that included the Hispanic community, Asian business leaders, Republicans, and independent voters. Historically, Hispanic turnout in Houston races hovered around 10%, but nearly 18% of Hispanic voters turned out in this race, with more than 77% voting for Sanchez.

Voter turnout in the 2001 mayoral race between Sanchez and Brown was historic. In addition to the near doubling of Latino voter turnout, the total number of voters in the December run-off remains the highest in Houston's history as of 2015. Sanchez narrowly lost the race by 10,702 votes.

In 2003, Sanchez ran for mayor against Bill White, a businessman and well-connected Democrat, and Sylvester Turner, a state representative and former candidate for mayor against then-Mayor Bob Lanier. Sanchez had improved his name identification in this race. Since his 2001 campaign, he had been offered several other opportunities, but said, "I knew, standing on that podium, looking at the crowd, that I would run again in 2003," Sanchez said. "It's what I want to do and be. When I start something, I stick to it." Sanchez made the run-off, but lost to Bill White in the general election.

He was elected Harris County Treasurer in 2006 making him the first Latino immigrant in Harris County to be elected to a countywide non-judicial office. Sanchez was reelected in 2010 and again in 2014. He lost in 2018 to Dylan Osborne, 54%-46%.

=== County Treasurer ===
As county treasurer, Sanchez oversaw Harris County's multiple bank accounts, paid the county's expenses and was an independent set of eyes in overseeing spending of county taxpayer dollars. The treasurer's office won several transparency awards after Sanchez took office including Sunny Awards for transparency in 2010 and 2011 from the Sunshine Review and achieved Platinum Level in the Texas State Comptroller's Leadership Circle for Transparency in Local Government Reporting.

=== County Judge ===
Sanchez is the Republican candidate for Harris County judge in the November 2026 general election, having defeated Warren Howell in the Republican primary runoff.

=== Controversy ===
Three days before his tenure as Harris County treasurer expired in December 2018, Sanchez held a press conference in the parking lot across from the Houston Independent School District administrative building in which he called for the Texas Education Agency to take control of HISD schools. The press conference was preempted with strong criticism by a crowd of parents, teachers, and activists opposed to his position who chanted "Go away, TEA", "shame", and "You got voted out." After the crowd peppered him with questions and criticisms for some time, one person dumped water on his head. Sanchez would later sue the protester for $1 million, claiming "past and future mental anguish."

== Civic activities ==
Sanchez sat on the Harris County Bail Bonds Board, is a member of the board of directors of Capital Bank Texas, and a life member of the Houston Livestock Show and Rodeo and the 100 Club of Houston. He is a member of the University of Houston Foundation Board of Directors and is a former advisory member of the University of Houston Law School Foundation. He is a fellow of the British-American Project and a member of the Council on Foreign Relations. He is a current advisory member of Volunteer Interfaith Caregivers-Southwest. He is also a member of the Patriot Guard Riders, a group that participates in memorial services honoring Fallen Military Heroes, First Responders and Honorably Discharged Veterans.
