= 2003 Houston mayoral election =

- November 4, 2003 (first round); December 6, 2003 (runoff)
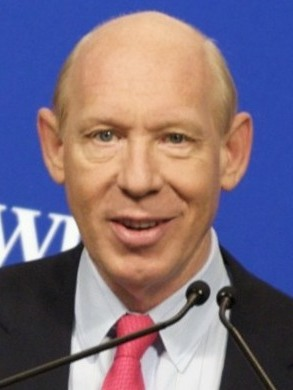

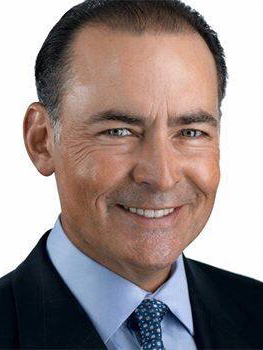

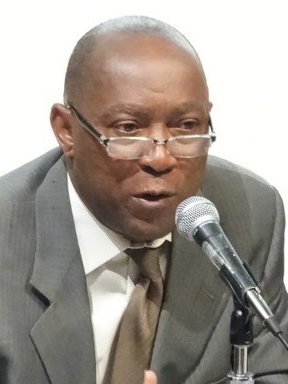
Candidate	Bill White	Orlando Sanchez	Sylvester Turner
First round	111,596; 39%	98,072; 34%	88,225; 28%
Runoff	136,617; 63%	81,824; 37%	Eliminated
Mayor before election
Lee P. Brown
Elected mayor
Bill White

The 2003 Houston mayoral election took place to elect a successor to Mayor of Houston Lee Brown. An election was first held on November 4, 2003; as no candidate received a majority of the votes a runoff election was held on December 6, 2003, and resulted in the election of Former Deputy Secretary of Energy Bill White. The election was non-partisan.

== Candidates ==
- Former Deputy Secretary of Energy Bill White
- Former City Council Member Orlando Sanchez
- State Representative Sylvester Turner
- Anthony Dutrow
- John Worldpeace
- Jack Terence
- Luis Ullrich
- Raymond Rodriguez

== Polling ==
=== Primary ===
Poll source	Date(s) administered	Sample size (Note: Key: A – all adults RV – registered voters LV – likely voters CV – certain voters V – unclear)	Margin of error	Bill White (D)	Orlando Sanchez (R)	Sylvester Turner (D)	Other / Undecided
SurveyUSA	October 30 – November 1, 2003	621 (CV)	± 4.0%	36%	33%	28%	3%

=== Runoff ===
Poll source	Date(s) administered	Sample size	Margin of error	Bill White (D)	Orlando Sanchez (R)	Other / Undecided
SurveyUSA	December 1–3, 2003	505 (CV)	± 4.5%	57%	41%	2%

== Results ==
Houston mayoral election, 2003
Candidate	Votes	%
Bill White	111,596	38%
Orlando Sanchez	98,072	34%
Sylvester Turner	88,225	28%

Houston mayoral election, 2003 Run-Off
Candidate	Votes	%
Bill White	136,617	63%
Orlando Sanchez	81,824	37%

== See also ==
- 2009 Houston mayoral election
- Elections in Texas
