= Lee P. Brown =

American politician, criminologist and businessman

Lee Brown
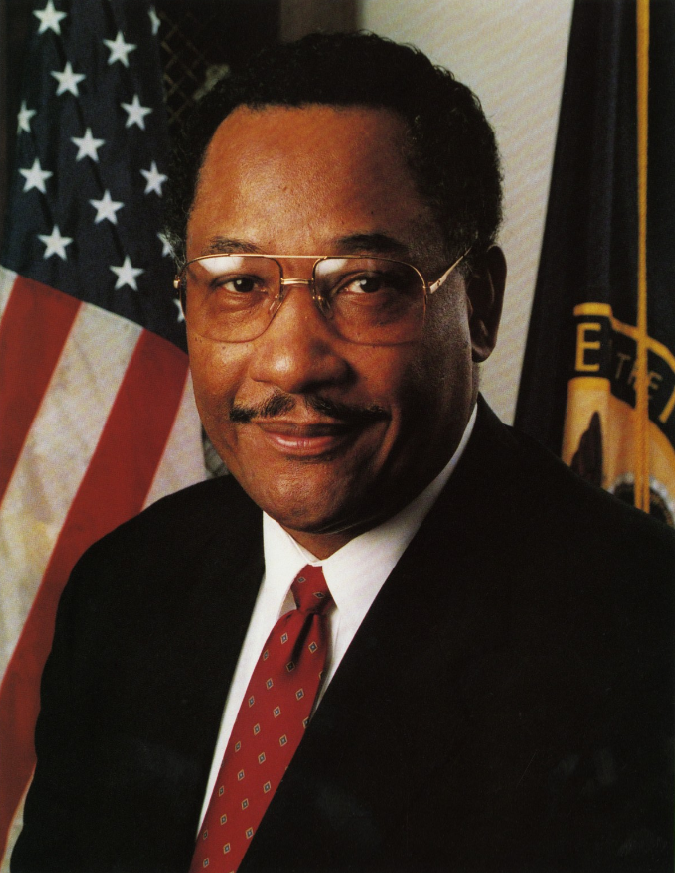
- Official portrait, 1996

59th Mayor of Houston
- In office January 2, 1998 – January 2, 2004
- Preceded by: Bob Lanier
- Succeeded by: Bill White

Director of the Office of National Drug Control Policy
- In office July 19, 1993 – January 1996
- President: Bill Clinton
- Preceded by: John Walters (Acting)
- Succeeded by: Barry McCaffrey

Police Commissioner of New York City
- In office January 22, 1990 – September 1, 1992
- Appointed by: David Dinkins
- Preceded by: Richard Condon
- Succeeded by: Ray Kelly

Police Chief of Houston
- In office 1982–1990
- Appointed by: Kathy Whitmire
- Preceded by: B.K. Johnson
- Succeeded by: Elizabeth Watson

31st Sheriff of Multnomah County
- In office 1975–1976
- Preceded by: Louis Rinehart
- Succeeded by: Edgar E. Martin

Personal details
- Born: October 4, 1937 (age 89) Wewoka, Oklahoma, U.S.
- Party: Democratic
- Spouse(s): Yvonne Brown (m. 1959; died 1992) Frances Young (m. 1996)
- Children: 4
- Education: California State University, Fresno (BS); San Jose State University (MA); University of California, Berkeley (MS, PhD)

Lee Patrick Brown (born October 4, 1937) is an American politician, criminologist and businessman; in 1997 he was the first African-American to be elected mayor of Houston, Texas. He was re-elected twice to serve the maximum of three terms from 1998 to 2004.

He has had a long career in law enforcement and academia; leading police departments in Atlanta, Houston and New York over the course of nearly four decades. With practical experience and a doctorate from University of California, Berkeley, he has combined research and operations in his career. After serving as Public Safety Commissioner of Atlanta, Georgia, he was appointed in 1982 as the first African-American police chief in Houston, Texas, where he implemented techniques in community policing to reduce crime.

== Background and education ==
His parents, Andrew and Zelma Brown were sharecroppers in Oklahoma, and Lee Brown was born in Wewoka. His family, including five brothers and one sister, moved to California in the second wave of the Great Migration and his parents continued as farmers. A high school athlete, Brown earned a football scholarship to Fresno State University, where he earned a B.S. in criminology in 1960. That year he started as a police officer in San Jose, California, where he served for eight years. Brown was elected as the president of the San Jose Police Officers' Association (union) and served from 1965 to 1966.

Brown went on to earn a master's degree in sociology from San José State University in 1964, and became an assistant professor there in 1968. He also earned a second master's degree in criminology from University of California, Berkeley in 1968. In the same year, he moved to Portland, Oregon, where he established and served as chairman of the Department of Administration of Justice at Portland State University.

== Career ==
In 1972, Brown was appointed associate director of the Institute of Urban Affairs and Research and professor of Public Administration and director of Criminal Justice programs at Howard University. In 1974, Brown was named Sheriff of Multnomah County, Oregon and in 1976 became director of the Department of Justice Services.

=== Police management ===
In 1978, he was appointed Public Safety Commissioner of Atlanta, Georgia, serving to 1982. Brown and his staff oversaw investigation of the Atlanta Child Murders case and increased efforts to provide safety in black areas of the city during the period when murders were committed. A critical element of reform during Brown's tenure was increasing diversity of the police force. By the time Brown resigned to accept the top police job in Houston, Atlanta's police force was 20 percent black.

==== Police chief - Houston ====
In 1982, Brown was the first African American to be appointed as Police Chief to the City of Houston, serving until 1990. He was first appointed by Mayor Kathy Whitmire. (Note: The appointment was controversial, with the president of the Houston Police Officer Association claiming that he was "shocked and surprised" by the mayor's choice and suggested that she had appointed Brown just because he was black. Brown was also the first outsider to be nominated for that position since 1941.) The Houston Police Department seemed to be in constant turmoil and badly needed reform. According to one of Brown's colleagues at Atlanta, ... "Everybody knows Lee likes challenges and anyone who knows about the Houston Police Department knows it's one helluva challenge." (Note: The Justice Department had already ranked the Houston Police Department as the third worst in the nation, trailing only Philadelphia and Memphis.) After coming to Houston, Brown quickly began to implement methods of community policing, building relationships with the city's diverse communities. (Note: The Hispanic and Black communities comprised 45 percent of the total Houston population, but only 8 percent of the police force.)

The Houston Police Officers Union (HPOU) recently published a history describing in more detail how Brown's reforms were implemented and how it became accepted by the officers as well as the communities they served over a period of years. Initially, the officers were unimpressed by what Brown termed Neighborhood-Oriented Policing (NOP). Old-time officers saw it as simply reverting to a long-discredited policy of "walking a beat," and claimed the acronym meant "never on patrol."

Brown and his staff divided the city into 23 identifiable "neighborhoods." Each neighborhood had a small informal office, located in a storefront, where people from the neighborhood were invited to come in and discuss their concerns or problems with one of the officers that served there. Brown emphasized through his officer training sessions that getting feedback from the public was as important as writing up tickets or doing paperwork chores. The neighborhood officers soon recognized the hot spots and the neighborhood "movers and shakers" who could be helpful in preventing problems.

Brown was credited with getting more police officers into the neighborhoods during his tenure. Relations between the residents and the police were far better than ever before, with residents becoming willing to work with the police implementing various activities. He was quoted as saying that sixty percent of all cities in the U.S. had adopted some form of NOP by the time he stepped down as Houston's chief.

==== Police Commissioner - New York City ====
In December 1989 Brown was named by Mayor David Dinkins as Police Commissioner of New York City, the first non-New Yorker appointed in a quarter of a century as head of the nation's largest police force. In January 1990, he took over a police force that was seven times the size of Houston's, with "a complex organization of more than 26,000 officers" and a 346-member executive corps of officers at the rank of captain and above. At the time, the force was 75% white; there were issues of perception of police justice and sensitivity in a city with a population estimated to be half minorities: black, Hispanic and Asian.

Brown implemented community policing citywide, which reportedly quadrupled the number of police officers on foot patrol and had a goal of creating a partnership between the police and citizens. The fact that reported crimes were 6.7 percent lower for the first four months of 1992, compared to the previous year, indicated that Brown's program was having a positive effect, according to the Treadwell article.

On the other hand, according to Treadwell, the police department was being criticized for the alleged ineffectiveness of its internal affairs division in the wake of allegations of drug dealing and bribery by some officers. Dinkins had appointed a five-member panel to investigate the corruption allegations, and had asked the City Council to establish an all-civilian review board to look at charges of police brutality. Brown was already on record as opposing both actions. Both Brown and Dinkins took great pains to assure reporters that the policy disagreement played no role in Brown's decision to leave.

Brown submitted his resignation from the New York City position effective September 1, 1992. He and Mayor Dinkins held a joint news conference to explain the reason for his sudden departure. Brown stated that he was leaving to care for his wife, who was ill, and to rejoin the rest of his family, who were still in Houston. He added that he had accepted a college teaching position in Houston.

In 1993, Brown was appointed by President Bill Clinton as his Director of the Office of National Drug Control Policy (ONDCP, or "Drug Czar"), and moved to Washington, DC. The Senate unanimously confirmed his appointment.

=== Mayor of Houston ===
In the late 1990s, Brown returned to Houston and entered politics directly, running for mayor. In 1997, Brown became the first African American elected as mayor of Houston. During Brown's administration, the city invested extensively in infrastructure: it started the first 7.5-mile leg of its light-rail system and obtained voter approval for an extension, along with increases in bus service, park and ride facilities and HOV lanes. It opened three new professional sports facilities, attracting visitors to the city. It revitalized the downtown area: constructing the city's first convention center hotel, doubling the size of the convention center; and constructing the Hobby Center of the Performing Arts. In addition, it built and renovated new libraries, police and fire stations. Brown initiated a $2.9 billion development program at the city's airport, which consisted of new terminals and runways; and a consolidated rental car facility; in addition to renovating other terminals and runways, he built a new water treatment plant.

Brown also advanced the city's affirmative action program; installed programs in city libraries to provide access to the Internet; built the state-of-the-art Houston Emergency Communications Center; implemented e-government, and opened new parks. Brown led trade missions for the business community to other countries and promoted international trade. He increased the number of foreign consulates.

==== 2001 election campaign ====
Brown undertook a massive program to reconstruct the downtown street system and replace the aging underground utility system. The accompanying traffic problems was made a campaign issue by his opponent, three-term city councilman Orlando Sanchez in the 2001 election campaign. In 2001 Brown narrowly survived the reelection challenge and runoff against Sanchez, a Cuban-born man who grew up in Houston. The election characterized by especially high voter turnout in both black and Hispanic districts.

Sanchez' supporters highlighted poor street conditions, campaigning that the "P stands for Pothole," referring to Brown's middle initial. Sanchez drove a Hummer as his campaign vehicle during this period, which was adorned with the banner, "With Brown in Town it's the only way to get around."

Following the death of Houston Fire Captain Jay Janhke in the line of duty, Sanchez gained endorsements from the fire/emergency medical services sector. Brown changed Fire Department policy on staffing as a result of the captain's death.

The Brown-Sanchez election attracted involvement from several national political figures, who contributed to its rhetoric. Brown was endorsed by former Democratic president Bill Clinton while Sanchez was endorsed by then-President George W. Bush, former President George H. W. Bush and his wife, former First Lady Barbara Bush; Rudy Giuliani and a host of other Republicans. Some members of the President's cabinet campaigned for Sanchez in Houston.

The contest had ethnic undertones as Sanchez, a Cuban American, was vying to become the first Hispanic mayor of Houston; he challenged Brown, who was the city's first African-American mayor. According to the U.S. Census 2000, the racial makeup of the city was 49.3% White (including Hispanic or Latino), 25.3% Black or African American, 0.4% Native American, 5.3% Asian, 0.18% Pacific Islander, 16.5% from other races, and 3.2% from two or more races. 37% of the population was Hispanic or Latino of any race.

Voting split along racial and political party lines, with a majority of African Americans and Asians (largely Democrats) supporting Brown, and a majority of Hispanic and Anglo voters (largely Republicans) supporting Sanchez. Brown had 43% in the first round of voting, and Sanchez 40%, which resulted in their competing in a run-off. Chris Bell received 16% of the ballots cast in the first round. Brown narrowly won reelection by a margin of three percentage points following heavy voter turnout in predominantly Black precincts, compared to relatively light turnout in Hispanic precincts, although Hispanic voting in the runoff election was much higher than previously.

Brown's 2001 reelection was one of the last major political campaigns supported by the Houston-based Enron Corporation, which collapsed in a financial scandal days after the election.

=== Electoral history ===
==== 1997 ====
Houston Mayoral Election 1997
Candidate		Votes	%	±
✓	Lee P. Brown	132,324	42.26%	
✓	Robert Mosbacher, Jr.	90,320	28.84%	
	George Greanias	53,115	16.96%	
	Gracie Saenz	21,950	7.01%	

Houston Mayoral Election 1997, runoff
Candidate		Votes	%	±
✓	Lee P. Brown	156,307	52.67%	
	Robert Mosbacher, Jr.	140,449	47.33%	

=== 1999 ===
Houston Mayoral Election 1999
Candidate		Votes	%	±
✓	Lee P. Brown	139,150	67.29%	+25.03
	Jack Terence	47,887	23.16%	
	Outlaw Josey Wales, IV	19,741	9.55%	

=== 2001 ===
Houston Mayoral Election 2001
Candidate		Votes	%	±
✓	Lee P. Brown	125,282	43.46%	-23.83
✓	Orlando Sanchez	115,967	40.23%	
	Chris Bell	45,739	15.87%	

Houston Mayoral Election 2001, runoff
Candidate		Votes	%	±
✓	Lee P. Brown	165,866	51.67%	
	Orlando Sanchez	155,164	48.33%	

== Marriage and family ==
Brown has been married twice. His first wife, Yvonne Brown, died of cancer. They had four children together (Patrick, Torri, Jenna and Robyn (twins). He is currently married to Frances Young, a retired teacher from the Houston Independent School District.

== Legacy and honors ==
- 2004 - The Metropolitan Transit Authority Administration Building, headquarters of Metropolitan Transit Authority of Harris County, was named for Brown to honor his work in transportation, police protection, education and revitalization of the city.
- 2005 – The Houston in Harmony mural in honor of Mayor Lee P. Brown was moved March 23, 2005, to the Lee P. Brown Metropolitan Transit Authority Administration Building at the request of the Honey Brown Hope Foundation, where it is on permanent display.
- 1999 – Honey Brown Hope Foundation commissioned a mural, Houston in Harmony, in honor of Mayor Lee P. Brown's work in diversity; it was displayed at the City Hall Annex during his tenure, to 2003.
- 1993 – Gallup Hall of Fame by Gallup, Inc.
- 1992 – Cartier Pasha Award from Cartier International
- 1991 – Father of the Year by the National Father's Day Committee

== Publications ==
- Co-author of Police and Society; An Environment for Collaboration and Confrontation
- Author of Policing in the 21st Century: Community Policing, 2012.
- Growing up to be Mayor. Dr. Lee P. Brown. BGI Press. 2013.

== See also ==
- History of African Americans in Houston
- List of first African-American mayors

== Notes ==
Police appointments
Preceded by B.K. Johnson	Police Chief of Houston; 1982–1990	Succeeded by Elizabeth Watson
Preceded by Richard Condon	Police Commissioner of New York City; 1990–1992	Succeeded by Ray Kelly
Political offices
Preceded by John Walters; Acting	Director of the Office of National Drug Control Policy; 1993–1996	Succeeded by Barry McCaffrey
Preceded by Bob Lanier	Mayor of Houston; 1998–2004	Succeeded by Bill White
