= Chris Bell (politician) =

American politician (born 1959)

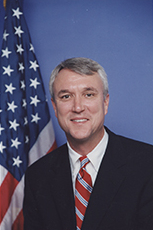
- Official portrait, 2003

Member of the U.S. House of Representatives from Texas's 25th district
- In office January 3, 2003 – January 3, 2005
- Preceded by: Ken Bentsen
- Succeeded by: Al Green (redistricted)

Member of the Houston City Council from the at-large district
- In office February 15, 1997 – January 2, 2002
- Preceded by: John Peavy
- Succeeded by: Michael Berry

Personal details
- Born: Robert Christopher Bell; November 23, 1959 (age 66) Abilene, Texas, U.S.
- Party: Democratic
- Spouse: Alison Ayres
- Children: 2
- Education: University of Texas, Austin (BA); South Texas College of Law (JD)

Robert Christopher Bell (born November 23, 1959) is an American politician, attorney, and former journalist. He is a graduate of the University of Texas at Austin and South Texas College of Law. A member of the Democratic Party, Bell served five years on the Houston City Council from 1997 to 2001, followed by one term in the United States House of Representatives from Texas's 25th congressional district in Houston from 2003 to 2005.

Bell was the Democratic nominee in the 2006 Texas gubernatorial election, losing to incumbent Republican governor Rick Perry in an election featuring two major independent candidates. Bell is an attorney specializing in personal injury and commercial litigation. Prior to practicing law, Bell had been a prominent radio journalist in Texas.

== Personal history ==
Chris Bell was born in Abilene on November 23, 1959. He was raised in Dallas and moved to Austin to attend the University of Texas at Austin. As a student, Bell was a member of Phi Delta Theta, and served as president of the Interfraternity Council, and also spearheaded a successful effort to reinstate student government. In 1982, he graduated with a journalism degree and began work as a television and radio journalist, first in Ardmore, Oklahoma, and later in Amarillo. He then moved to Houston, working as a Harris County court radio reporter while taking night classes at South Texas College of Law.

Despite his success in journalism (he was named "best radio reporter in the state" in 1990 by the Texas Associated Press), Bell left journalism and began what would become a successful litigation practice after receiving his J.D. degree and being licensed as an attorney in Texas in 1992. Bell's public service career began in 1997, after being elected to the Houston City Council. After his campaign for State Senate in 2008, Bell returned to the private practice of law. He lives in the Heights area of Houston.

== Political career ==
=== Texas House of Representatives campaign (1984) ===
In 1984, Bell ran for Amarillo-based District 87 for the Texas House of Representatives after friends assured him they could get him a job as a legal assistant if he won. Bell was defeated by a large margin by incumbent Charles J. "Chip" Staniswalis.

=== Houston City Council (1997–2002) ===
Bell ran for Houston City Council in 1995. He received third place, behind David Ballard and eventual winner Orlando Sanchez. He ran again in a 1997 special election, called to fill the seat vacated by the resignation of John Peavy. He placed second in the election after African American minister James W.E. Dixon II. However, since no candidate won more than 50 percent of the vote, the election went to a runoff. Bell defeated Dixon by 6,000 votes. Bell served as at large Position 4 councilman for the Houston City Council for five years.

=== Mayoral campaign (2001) ===
In 2001, Bell ran against incumbent mayor Lee P. Brown. Brown and Bell's first disagreement was previously in 2000, when Bell joined with conservatives to pass a 2-cent property tax rollback, causing Brown to replace Bell as chairman. Bell finished third behind Brown and Republican candidate Orlando Sanchez.

=== U.S. Congress (2003–2005) ===
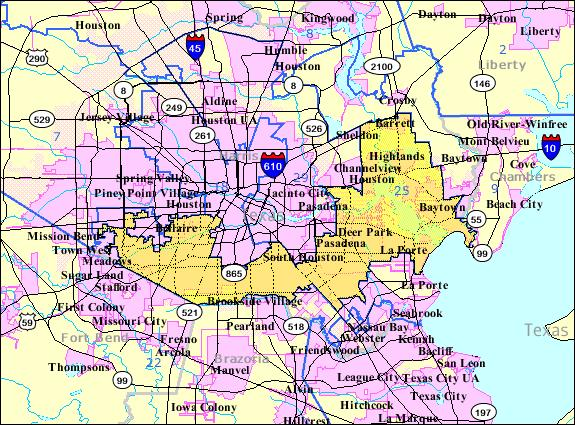
Bell's Congressional District

In 2002, Bell successfully ran for the United States House of Representatives for Texas District 25. He represented most of southwestern Houston, including most of the city's share of Fort Bend County. He was made assistant whip by House Democratic whip Steny Hoyer of Maryland. Bell also served on four standing committees, and was responsible for founding the Port Security Caucus, a group dedicated to improving seaport security.

In October 2003, Bell became a target in U.S. House Majority Leader Tom DeLay's 2003 congressional redistricting effort. One proposal would have thrown Bell into the heavily Republican 7th District of John Culberson. The final plan was somewhat less ambitious, but still put Bell in political jeopardy. His 25th District was renumbered as the 9th District, and absorbed a larger number of blacks and Latinos than he had previously represented. The old 25th was approximately 65 percent white; the new 9th was only 17 percent white. On March 9, 2004, Bell was handily defeated in the Democratic primary for District 9 by Al Green, the former president of the Houston NAACP, with Bell receiving only 31 percent of the vote.

Three months after losing his primary election, on June 15, 2004, Bell filed an ethics complaint against DeLay, alleging abuse of power and illegal solicitation of money, among other things. Bell's charges ended a seven-year "truce" on such official accusations between the parties. Four months later, the House Ethics Committee unanimously "admonished" DeLay – a disciplinary measure less harsh than (in increasing order of severity) a fine, reprimand, censure, or expulsion – on two of Bell's charges.

=== First gubernatorial campaign (2006) ===
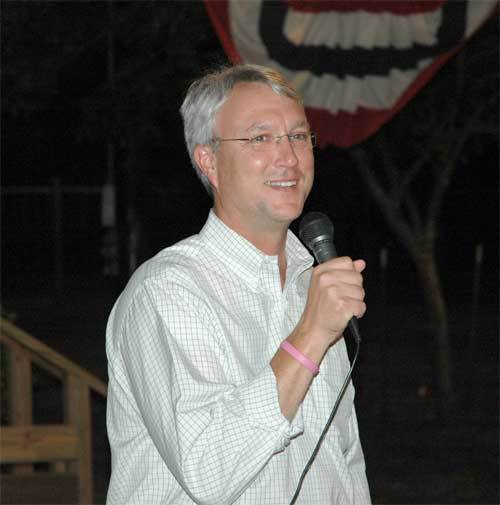
Bell campaigning for Governor

Bell was the Democratic candidate in the 2006 election for the office of Governor of Texas. He ran against Republican incumbent Rick Perry and independents Carole Strayhorn and Kinky Friedman. Bell ultimately received 1,310,353 votes, or 29.79%, in the four-way race. Following the loss, Chris Bell and the political action committee (PAC) "Clean Government Advocates for Chris Bell" sued Gov. Perry and the Republican Governors Association, claiming they illegally hid $1 million in donations from Houston homebuilder Bob Perry (no relation to the governor) in the final days of the 2006 gubernatorial campaign.

Rick Perry chose to settle his part of the lawsuit out of court, but the Republican Governors Association did not. An initial court ruling in 2010 (by Travis County judge John Dietz) favored Bell, but that verdict was subsequently reversed on appeal in 2013, and the appellate court panel sent the case back to District Court to determine how much Bell should reimburse the governors association for associated legal fees.

=== State Senate District 17 campaign (2008) ===
On July 18, 2008, Bell announced on his campaign website that he would run in the special election for Texas Senate, District 17. The election was made necessary by the resignation of Republican senator Kyle Janek. While Bell emerged with a plurality in the November 4, 2008, election, he did not garner enough votes to avoid a special election runoff with Republican Joan Huffman, a former judge and prosecutor. Despite heavy support from Democratic volunteers and officials, he ultimately lost the runoff to Huffman on December 16 with 43.7 percent of the vote to Huffman's 56.3 percent.

=== Mayoral campaign (2015) ===
Bell ran for Houston Mayor in 2015 but finished fifth during the general elections. Bell then endorsed Bill King, raising eyebrows. Bell had received only 7 percent of the general vote, concentrated in the district C precincts. It was not dispersed throughout the entire city.

=== Senate campaign (2020) ===
Bell ran for Senate in Texas in the 2020 election. He lost the March 2020 Democratic primary, coming in sixth place with 8.5% of the vote and failing to advance to the runoff. Bell finished behind former congressional candidate M.J. Hegar, State Senator Royce West, labor organizer Cristina Tzintzún Ramirez, businesswoman Annie "Mamá" Garcia, and Houston City Councilor Amanda Edwards.

=== Second gubernatorial campaign ===
Bell announced a campaign for Governor of Texas in the 2026 election on November 11, 2025. He came in second in the Democratic primary.

== Issues and positions ==
=== Abortion ===
Bell voted no on banning partial birth abortion except to save the mother's life.

=== Immigration ===
Bell supports the use of United States National Guard troops along the U.S.-Mexico border, "as long as we are very careful not to turn the border into a militarized zone." He also supports the McCain-Kennedy bill that would provide a "pathway" to citizenship for millions of illegal immigrants already in the country, provided they had jobs, learned English, paid fines and met certain other requirements. "I don't want to see anybody cutting in line, but I do think that people should be able to earn their citizenship if they're productive and law-abiding citizens."

=== Education ===
Bell supports increased spending for the Texas public education system. He wants to focus on acquiring and retaining quality teachers, stopping textbook censorship, and taking the focus away from standardized tests like Texas Assessment of Knowledge and Skills (TAKS). He wants to create a bipartisan committee on public education and give school districts more local control. Finally, he wants to make Texas higher education affordable. He wants to end the tuition deregulation which caused a 23% average increase in tuition at Texas state schools. He also wants to give public universities state funding and help students by making textbooks tax free.

=== Gay rights ===
Bell is a lifelong proponent of gay rights. In 2002, the Houston Chapter of the Human Rights Campaign awarded him with their first ever John Walzel Political Equality Award. He cosponsored the Permanent Partners Immigration Act with Houston Congress member Sheila Jackson-Lee. The bill sought to offer residency to immigrant same-sex partners of U.S. citizens, much as citizens of other countries who marry Americans are allowed to stay in the country.

=== Healthcare ===
Bell is a supporter of stem cell research. Bell has served on the board of StemPAC, a leading stem cell advocacy group, and has spoken at national stem cell conferences. While a member of the 108th United States Congress, he consistently voted for stem cell research. Bell is also a strong proponent of the Children's Health Insurance Program (CHIP), a program that was the target of budget cuts by Governor Rick Perry.

U.S. House of Representatives
Preceded by Ken Bentsen	Member of the U.S. House of Representatives from Texas's 25th congressional district 2003–2005	Succeeded by Lloyd Doggett
Party political offices
Preceded by Tony Sanchez	Democratic nominee for Governor of Texas; 2006	Succeeded by Bill White
U.S. order of precedence (ceremonial)
Preceded by Ross Spano as Former U.S. Representative	Order of precedence of the United States as Former U.S. Representative	Succeeded by Quico Canseco as Former U.S. Representative
