= 2023 Houston mayoral election =

- November 7, 2023 (first round); December 9, 2023 (runoff)
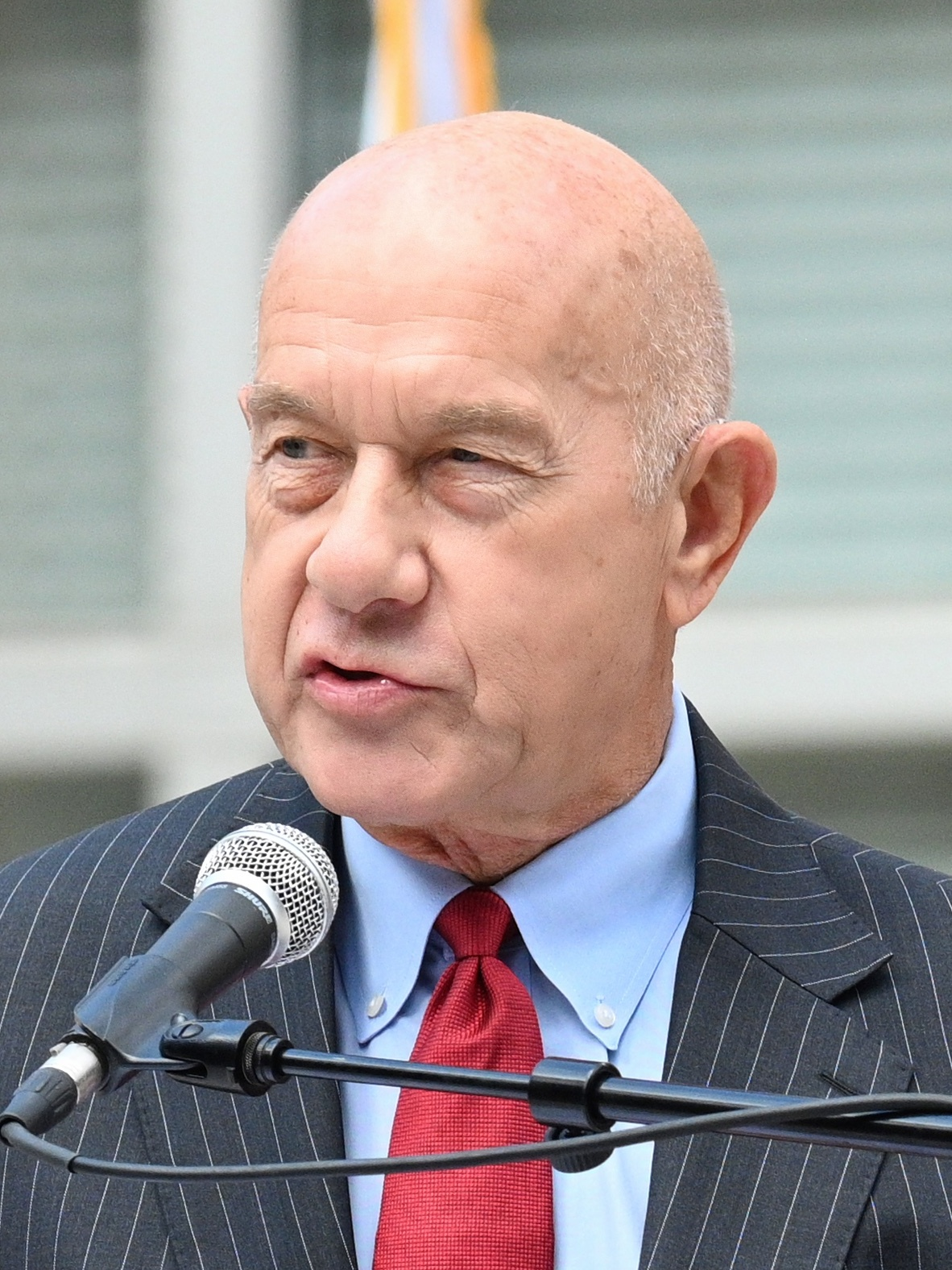

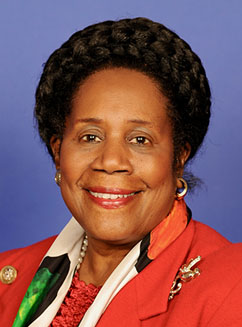

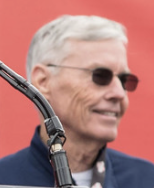
Candidate	John Whitmire	Sheila Jackson Lee
First round	107,410; 42.50%	90,093; 35.64%
Runoff	129,495; 64.42%	71,523; 35.58%
Candidate	Gilbert Garcia	Jack Christie
First round	18,220; 7.21%	17,364; 6.87%
Runoff	Eliminated	Eliminated
Mayor before election
Sylvester Turner
Elected mayor
John Whitmire

The 2023 Houston mayoral election was held on November 7, 2023, with a runoff on December 9 because no candidate won a majority of the vote in the first round. It was held to elect the mayor of Houston, Texas. Incumbent Democratic mayor Sylvester Turner was term-limited and could not seek re-election to a third term in office. Municipal elections in Texas are officially nonpartisan.

Two longtime fixtures of Houston politics, state senator John Whitmire and U.S. representative Sheila Jackson Lee, advanced to the runoff. Both were Democrats, though Whitmire had drawn support from some Republicans while Turner endorsed Jackson Lee as his successor. Polls of the runoff consistently showed wide leads for Whitmire. Candidates eliminated in the first round include bond investor Gilbert Garcia and former at-large city councilor Jack Christie, the leading Republican candidate.

Whitmire prevailed in the runoff, defeating Jackson Lee in a landslide victory.

== Candidates ==
=== Advanced to runoff ===
- Sheila Jackson Lee, U.S. representative for Texas's 18th congressional district (party affiliation: Democratic)
- John Whitmire, state senator and brother-in-law of former mayor Kathy Whitmire (party affiliation: Democratic)

=== Eliminated in the first round ===
- Derrick Broze, investigative journalist and candidate for mayor in 2019 (party affiliation: Libertarian)
- Jack Christie, former at-large city council member and former chair of the Texas State Board of Education (party affiliation: Republican)
- Robert Gallegos, city council member (party affiliation: Democratic)
- Gilbert Garcia, bond investor and former chair of the Houston Metro Board of Directors (party affiliation: Democratic)
- Ralph Garcia
- Naoufal Houjami, entertainment consultant and candidate for mayor in 2019
- Lee Kaplan, attorney (party affiliation: Democratic)
- M.J. Khan, former city council member and former president of the Islamic Society of Greater Houston (party affiliation: Republican)
- Julian Antonio Martinez, business owner
- Chanel Mbala, IT professional and Uber driver (party affiliation: Independent)
- Rickey Tezino, community activist
- Robin Williams, police officer and U.S. Marine Corps veteran (party affiliation: Democratic)

=== Withdrew ===
- Amanda Edwards, former at-large city council member and candidate for U.S. Senate in 2020 (party affiliation: Democratic) (ran unsuccessfully for U.S. House, endorsed Jackson Lee)
- Chris Hollins, member of the Houston Metro Board of Directors, former acting Harris County Clerk, and former vice chair of the Texas Democratic Party (party affiliation: Democratic) (ran successfully for City Controller)

=== Declined ===
- Tony Buzbee, attorney and runner-up for mayor in 2019 (party affiliation: Independent) (ran unsuccessfully for city council)

== First round ==
=== Endorsements ===
Gilbert Garcia

Organizations

- Latino Victory Fund
Chris Hollins (withdrawn)

State representatives

- Joe Deshotel, HD-22 (1999–2023)
- Barbara Gervin-Hawkins, HD-120 (2017–present)

Local officials

- Steve Adler, former mayor of Austin (2015–2023)
Sheila Jackson Lee

Federal officials

- Hillary Clinton, former U.S. Secretary of State (2009–2013)
- Arthur Louis Schechter, former U.S. Ambassador to the Bahamas (1998–2001)

U.S. representatives

- Hakeem Jeffries, House Minority Leader (2023–present) from NY-08 (2013–present)
- Beto O'Rourke, TX-16 (2013–2019) and 2020 Democratic presidential candidate
- Nancy Pelosi, Speaker Emerita (2007–2011, 2019–2023) from CA-11 (1987–present)

State representatives

- Alma Allen, HD-131 (2005–present)
- Ron Reynolds, HD-27 (2011–present)
- Senfronia Thompson, HD-141 (1973–present)

Municipal officials

- Rodney Ellis, Harris County commissioner from the 1st precinct (2017–present) and former state senator from the 13th district (1990–2017)
- Eric Fagan, Fort Bend County Sheriff (2021–present)
- Lina Hidalgo, Harris County Judge (2019–present)
- Christian Menefee, Harris County Attorney (2021–present)
- Grady Prestage, Fort Bend County commissioner from the 2nd precinct (1990–present)
- Bridgette Smith-Lawson, Fort Bend County district attorney (2021–present)
- Beverly Walker, Fort Bend County district clerk (2018–present)

Local officials

- Karen Bass, mayor of Los Angeles (2022–present) and former U.S. representative from CA-37 (2011–2022)
- Jeffrey Boney, Missouri City councilor from district B (2017–present)
- Amanda Edwards, former at-large city council member (2016–2020) and former 2023 mayoral candidate
- Samuel Peña, Houston Fire Department Chief (2016–2024)
- Letitia Plummer, at-large Houston city council member for Position 4 (2020–present)
- Tiffany Thomas, Houston city council member from district F (2019–present)

Party officials

- Lillie Schechter, former Harris County Democratic Party Chair (2017–2021)

Individuals

- Tanweer Ahmed, owner of Houston Hurricanes
- Magic Johnson, former coach and professional basketball player of the Los Angeles Lakers
- Olivia Julianna, activist and political strategist

Labor unions

- AFSCME Local 1550
- AFT–Houston (2415) (previously endorsed Whitmire), Houston Educational Support Personnel (6315), Aldine (6345), Cy-Fair High School (6448), Northeast Houston (6568), and Alief (6346) chapters
- Central South Carpenters Local 551
- Coalition of Black Trade Unionists
- CWA District 6 and Locals 6186 and 6222
- Harris County Afro American Sheriff’s Deputies Union
- Houston Black Firefighters Association
- IUPAT Local 210 and District Council 10
- Service Employees International Union Texas
- Transport Workers Union of America Local 260

Organizations

- Annie's List
- EMILY's List
- ~~Harris County Young Democrats~~ (co-endorsement withdrawn; solely endorsed Whitmire)
- Houston LGBTQ+ Political Caucus
- Our Revolution
- Progressive Change Campaign Committee
John Whitmire

Federal officials

- Lee Brown, former Office of National Drug Control Policy Director (1993–1996) and Mayor of Houston (1998–2004)

U.S. representatives

- Sylvia Garcia, TX-29 (2019–present)
- Gene Green, TX-29 (1993–2019)

Statewide officials

- Todd Staples, former Texas Commissioner of Agriculture (2007–2014) (Republican)

State senators

- Carol Alvarado, Minority Leader of the Texas Senate (2020–present) from SD-6 (2018–present)
- Kevin Eltife, former president pro tempore of the Texas Senate (2015–2017) from SD-1 (2004–2017) (Republican)

State representatives

- Ellen Cohen, HD-134 (2007–2011) and former Houston city council member from district C (2012–2020)
- Ana Hernandez, HD-143 (2005–present)
- Dan Huberty, HD-127 (2011–2023) (Republican)
- Christian Manuel, HD-22 (2023–present)
- Hubert Vo, HD-149 (2005–present)
- Armando Walle, HD-140 (2009–present)

Municipal officials

- Sherman Eagleton, Harris County constable from the 3rd precinct (2017–present)
- Silvia Trevino, Harris County constable from the 6th precinct (2017–present)

Local officials

- Paula Arnold, former president (1991–1992, 1996–1997) of the Houston Independent School District Board of Education (1990–1998)
- Michael Berry, former at-large Houston City Council member (2002–2008) (Republican)
- Alice Chen, Stafford City Councilor from Position 1 (2019–present)
- Noel Freeman, Houston Public Works and Engineering Department Division Manager (2017–present) and former Houston LGBTQ+ Political Caucus President (2011–2014)
- Elyse Lanier, former First Lady of Houston (1992–1998) and widow of former Houston Mayor Bob Lanier
- Charles McClelland, former Houston Police Department Chief (2010–2016)
- James Rodriguez, former Houston City Council member from district I (2008–2014)
- Alton Smith, former chairman of the Lone Star College board of trustees from the 3rd district (2014–2020)
- Greg Travis, former Houston city council member from district G (2016–2022) (Republican)

Party officials

- Lane Lewis, former chair of the Harris County Democratic Party (2011–2016)
- Farrukh Shamsi, former vice chair of the Texas Democratic Party (2012–2015)

Individuals

- Tilman Fertitta, CEO of Landry's and owner of the Houston Rockets
- Irma Galvan, restaurateur
- Jim McIngvale, owner of Gallery Furniture (Republican)
- John Nau, beverage executive

Labor unions

- AFSCME Local 123
- Houston Afro-American Police Officers League
- ~~Houston Federation of Teachers~~ (endorsement withdrawn after Jackson Lee entered the race)
- Houston Fraternal Order of Police Lodges 39 and 110
- International Association of Fire Fighters Local 341
- ILA – International and the South Atlantic and Gulf District chapters
- Texas Gulf Coast Area AFL-CIO

Organizations

- American Council of Engineering Companies Houston PAC
- Emgage Action Texas (endorsed only in the first round) (Note: Before the first round of the election, Emgage had endorsed Whitmire. That endorsement has not "rolled over" to the runoff, according to Palwasha Sharwani, due to "the attacks of Oct. 7.")
- Greater Houston Builders Association PAC
- Harris County Young Democrats (previously co-endorsed with Jackson Lee)
- Houston Association of Realtors
- Houston Building Owners and Managers Association

Newspapers and other media

- Houston Chronicle

=== Fundraising ===
Some candidates have not filed financial disclosures. Those who have are listed below:

Campaign finance reports as of January 3, 2023
Candidate	Raised
Amanda Edwards	$1,100,000
Chris Hollins	$1,400,000
Lee Kaplan	$1,300,000
John Whitmire	$1,100,000
Robin Williams	$189,000

=== Polling ===
Poll source	Date(s) administered	Sample size (Note: Key: A – all adults RV – registered voters LV – likely voters V – unclear)	Margin of error	Jack Christie	Amanda Edwards	Gilbert Garcia	Robert Gallegos	Chris Hollins	Sheila Jackson Lee	Lee Kaplan	MJ Khan	John Whitmire	Other	Undecided
University of Houston	September 30–October 6, 2023	800 (LV)	± 3.5	4%	–	4%	1%	–	31%	2%	1%	34%	1%	22%
University of Houston	July 12–20, 2023	800 (LV)	± 3.5	–	–	3%	2%	–	32%	2%	2%	34%	3% (Note: Broze with 1%; Williams with 1%; others with 1%)	22%
Ragnar Research Partners (Note: This poll was sponsored by Protect and Serve Texas PAC and the Houston Region Business Coalition, both of which support Whitmire.)	February 21–23, 2023	500 (LV)	± 4.0%	–	4%	–	4%	5%	19%	–	–	20%	2%	46%

=== Results ===
2023 Houston mayoral election (first round)
Candidate	Votes	%
John Whitmire	107,410	42.50
Sheila Jackson Lee	90,093	35.64
Gilbert Garcia	18,220	7.21
Jack Christie	17,364	6.87
Lee Kaplan	6,645	2.63
Robert Gallegos	2,679	1.06
M.J. Khan	2,478	0.98
Annie "Mama" Garcia	1,979	0.78
Julian "Bemer" Antonio Martinez	1,813	0.72
Roy Vasquez	1,083	0.43
M. "Griff" Griffin	674	0.27
Kathy Lee Tatum	532	0.21
David C. Lowy	368	0.15
Chanel Mbala	356	0.14
Naoufal Houjami	352	0.14
Gaylon S. Caldwell	331	0.13
B. Ivy	287	0.11
Robin Williams	95	0.04
Total votes	252,759	100.00%

== Runoff ==
=== Endorsements ===
Endorsements in bold were made after the first round.

Sheila Jackson Lee

Federal officials

- **Bill Clinton**, former President of the United States (1993–2001)
- Hillary Clinton, former U.S. Secretary of State (2009–2013)
- Arthur Louis Schechter, former U.S. Ambassador to the Bahamas (1998–2001)

U.S. representatives

- **Troy Carter**, LA-2 (2021–present)
- **Steven Horsford**, NV-4 (2013–2015, 2019–present) and chair of the Congressional Black Caucus (2023–present)
- Hakeem Jeffries, House Minority Leader (2023-present) from NY-08 (2013-present)
- Beto O'Rourke, TX-16 (2013–2019) and 2020 Democratic presidential candidate
- Nancy Pelosi, Speaker Emerita (2007–2011, 2019–2023) from CA-11 (1987–present)

State representatives

- Alma Allen, state representative from the 131st district (2005–present)
- **Jolanda Jones**, state representative from the 147th district (2022–present)
- Ron Reynolds, state representative from the 27th district (2011–present)
- Senfronia Thompson, state representative from the 141st district (1973–present)

Municipal officials

- Rodney Ellis, Harris County commissioner from the 1st precinct (2017–present) and former state senator from the 13th district (1990–2017)
- Eric Fagan, Fort Bend County Sheriff (2021–present)
- Lina Hidalgo, Harris County Judge (2019–present)
- Christian Menefee, Harris County Attorney (2021–present)
- Grady Prestage, Fort Bend County commissioner from the 2nd precinct (1990–present)
- Bridgette Smith-Lawson, Fort Bend County district attorney (2021–present)
- Beverly Walker, Fort Bend County district clerk (2018–present)

Local officials

- Karen Bass, mayor of Los Angeles (2022–present) and former U.S. representative from CA-37 (2011–2022)
- Jeffrey Boney, Missouri City councilor from district B (2017–present)
- Amanda Edwards, former at-large city council member (2016–2020) and former 2023 mayoral candidate
- Samuel Peña, Houston Fire Department Chief (2016–2024)
- Letitia Plummer, at-large Houston city council member for Position 4 (2020–present)
- Tiffany Thomas, Houston city council member from district F (2019–present)
- **Sylvester Turner**, incumbent mayor of Houston (2016–2024)
- **Kathy Whitmire**, former mayor of Houston (1982–1991)

Party officials

- Lillie Schechter, former Harris County Democratic Party Chair (2017–2021)

Individuals

- Tanweer Ahmed, owner of Houston Hurricanes
- **Mark Curry**, actor
- **Jesse Jackson**, civil rights activist, former United States Shadow Senator from the District of Columbia (1991–1997) and 1984 and 1988 Democratic presidential candidate
- Magic Johnson, former coach and professional basketball player of the Los Angeles Lakers
- Olivia Julianna, activist and political strategist

Labor unions

- American Federation of State County and Municipal Employees Local 1550
- American Federation of Teachers - Houston (2415) (previously endorsed Whitmire), Houston Educational Support Personnel (6315), Aldine (6345), Cy-Fair High School (6448), Northeast Houston (6568), and Alief (6346) chapters
- Central South Carpenters Local 551
- Coalition of Black Trade Unionists
- Communication Workers of America District 6 and Locals 6186 and 6222
- Harris County Afro American Sheriff’s Deputies Union
- Houston Black Firefighters Association
- International Union of Painters and Allied Trades Local 210 and District Council 10
- Service Employees International Union Texas
- Transport Workers Union of America Local 260

Organizations

- Annie's List
- EMILY's List
- ~~Harris County Young Democrats~~(co-endorsement withdrawn; solely endorsed Whitmire)
- Houston LGBTQ+ Political Caucus
- Our Revolution
- Progressive Change Campaign Committee
John Whitmire

Federal officials

- Lee Brown, former Office of National Drug Control Policy Director (1993–1996) and Mayor of Houston (1998–2004)
- **Rod Paige**, former U.S. Secretary of Education (2001–2005), former superintendent of the Houston Independent School District (1994–2001) (Republican)

U.S. representatives

- Sylvia Garcia, TX-29 (2019–present)
- Gene Green, TX-29 (1993–2019)

Statewide officials

- Todd Staples, former Texas Commissioner of Agriculture (2007–2014) (Republican)

State senators

- Carol Alvarado, Minority Leader of the Texas Senate (2020–present) from the 6th district (2018–present)
- Kevin Eltife, former president pro tempore of the Texas Senate (2015–2017) from the 1st district (2004–2017) (Republican)

State representatives

- Ellen Cohen, former state representative from the 134th district (2007–2011) and former Houston city council member from district C (2012–2020)
- Ana Hernandez, state representative from the 143rd district (2005–present)
- Dan Huberty, former state representative from the 127th district (2011–2023) (Republican)
- Christian Manuel, state representative from the 22nd district (2023–present)
- **Mary Ann Perez**, state representative from the 144th district (2013–2015, 2017–present)
- Hubert Vo, state representative from the 149th district (2005–present)
- Armando Walle, state representative from the 140th district (2009–present)

Municipal officials

- Sherman Eagleton, Harris County constable from the 3rd precinct (2017–present)
- Silvia Trevino, Harris County constable from the 6th precinct (2017–present)

Local officials

- Paula Arnold, former president (1991–1992, 1996–1997) of the Houston Independent School District Board of Education (1990–1998)
- Michael Berry, former at-large Houston City Council member (2002–2008) (Republican)
- **Jew Don Boney**, former mayor pro tempore of Houston (1998–2002) from district D (1996–2002)
- Alice Chen, Stafford City Councilor from Position 1 (2019–present)
- **Jack Christie**, former at-large city council member (2011–2017) and former 2023 mayoral candidate
- Noel Freeman, Houston Public Works and Engineering Department Division Manager (2017–present) and former Houston LGBTQ+ Political Caucus President (2011–2014)
- **Robert Gallegos**, Houston City Council member from district I (2014–2024) and former 2023 mayoral candidate
- Tarsha Jackson, Houston City Council member from district B (2020–present)
- **Naushad Kermally**, Sugar Land City Councilor from the 2nd district (2019–present)
- Elyse Lanier, former First Lady of Houston (1992–1998) and widow of former Houston Mayor Bob Lanier
- **Joaquin Martinez**, Houston City Council member-elect from district I (2024–present)
- Charles McClelland, former Houston Police Department chief (2010–2016)
- **Annise Parker**, former mayor of Houston (2010–2016) and LGBTQ+ Victory Fund president (2017–present)
- James Rodriguez, former Houston City Council member from district I (2008–2014)
- Alton Smith, former chairman of the Lone Star College board of trustees from the 3rd district (2014–2020)
- Greg Travis, former Houston city council member from district G (2016–2022) (Republican)

Party officials

- Lane Lewis, former chair of the Harris County Democratic Party (2011–2016)
- Farrukh Shamsi, former vice chair of the Texas Democratic Party (2012–2015)

Individuals

- Tilman Fertitta, CEO of Landry's and owner of the Houston Rockets
- Irma Galvan, restaurateur
- Jim McIngvale, owner of Gallery Furniture (Republican)
- John Nau, beverage executive

Labor unions

- American Federation of State County and Municipal Employees Local 123
- Houston Afro-American Police Officers League
- ~~Houston Federation of Teachers~~ (endorsement withdrawn after Jackson Lee entered the race)
- Houston Fraternal Order of Police Lodges 39 and 110
- International Association of Fire Fighters Local 341
- International Longshoremen's Association - International and the South Atlantic and Gulf District chapters
- Texas Gulf Coast Area AFL-CIO

Organizations

- American Council of Engineering Companies Houston PAC
- ~~Emgage Action Texas~~ (endorsed only in the first round)
- Greater Houston Builders Association PAC
- Harris County Young Democrats (previously co-endorsed with Jackson Lee)
- Houston Association of Realtors
- Houston Building Owners and Managers Association

Newspapers and other media

- Houston Chronicle

=== Polling ===
Pollster	Date(s) administered	Sample size	Margin of error	Sheila Jackson Lee	John Whitmire	Undecided	Would not vote
Survey USA	November 13–18, 2023	805 (LV)	± 4.4%	35%	**42%**	22%	–
University of Houston	September 30 – October 6, 2023	800 (LV)	± 3.5%	36%	**50%**	9%	5%
University of Houston	July 12–20, 2023	800 (LV)	± 3.5%	33%	**51%**	13%	3%
Ragnar Research Partners	February 21–23, 2023	500 (LV)	± 4.0%	33%	**45%**	22%	–

==== Hypothetical polls ====
John Whitmire vs. Amanda Edwards

Pollster	Date(s) administered	Sample size	Margin of error	Amanda Edwards	John Whitmire	Undecided
Ragnar Research Partners	February 21–23, 2023	500 (LV)	± 4.0%	17%	**41%**	**43%**

John Whitmire vs. Chris Hollins

Pollster	Date(s) administered	Sample size	Margin of error	Chris Hollins	John Whitmire	Undecided
Ragnar Research Partners	February 21–23, 2023	500 (LV)	± 4.0%	14%	**39%**	**47%**

=== Results ===
2023 Houston mayoral election (runoff)
Candidate	Votes	%
John Whitmire	**129,495**	**64.42**
Sheila Jackson Lee	71,523	35.58
Total votes	**201,018**	**100.00%**

== Aftermath ==
Shortly after her loss, Jackson Lee filed to run for re-election to the U.S. House of Representatives on December 11, 2023. She would win the Democratic primary on March 5, 2024, but died on July 19, 2024. Despite their previous rivalry, Whitmire paid tribute to Jackson Lee, recalling how they worked together during the 2024 derecho. Whitmire also delivered opening remarks when Jackson Lee lay in state at Houston City Hall on July 29, 2024. Sylvester Turner replaced Jackson Lee as the Democratic nominee and went on to win the seat in the 2024 election, but died 61 days into his term on March 5, 2025.

== Notes ==
Partisan clients
