= Darlene Breaux =

American politician

Member-elect of the Texas House of Representatives from the 149th district
- Assuming office TBD
- Succeeding: Hubert Vo

Personal details
- Party: Democratic
- Education: Texas Southern University (B); University of Houston–Clear Lake (M); Abilene Christian University (Ed.D)

Darlene Elizabeth Breaux is an American politician and education consultant serving as board president of the Alief ISD. She is the Democratic member-elect for the 149th district of the Texas House of Representatives, having defeated incumbent Hubert Vo in the primary run-off election.

== Early life and education ==
Breaux grew up in Parkersburg, West Virginia, in a family with nine siblings. She was diagnosed with dyslexia as a child.

== Career ==
In January 2008, Breaux was a Weight Watchers meeting leader overseeing an initiative at Houston-area churches. She formerly worked as a teacher. In, she was elected to the Alief ISD school board.

In the 2026 Texas House of Representatives election, Breaux challenged incumbent Democrat Hubert Vo in the 149th district of the Texas House of Representatives. Her campaign was endorsed by state representative Ron Reynolds, Houston City Councilmembers Martha Castex-Tatum and Tiffany D. Thomas, the Houston LGBTQ+ Political Caucus, the Harris County Young Democrats, and the Houston Chronicle editorial board. In the primary election, Breaux and Vo each earned 38% of the vote; since neither received a majority, the two candidates advanced to a runoff election.
