= West Indian cricket team in New Zealand in 2013–14 =

	New Zealand	West Indies
- Dates: 3 December 2013 – 15 January 2014
Captains	Brendon McCullum	Daren Sammy (Test & T20I); Dwayne Bravo (ODI)

Test series
- Result: New Zealand won the 3-match series 2–0
Most runs	Ross Taylor (495)	Darren Bravo (262)
Most wickets	Trent Boult (20)	Tino Best (8)
- Player of the series: Ross Taylor (NZ)

One Day International series
- Results: 5-match series drawn 2–2
Most runs	Corey Anderson (190)	Dwayne Bravo (217)
Most wickets	Mitchell McClenaghan (8)	Dwayne Bravo (7); Jason Holder (7)
- Player of the series: Dwayne Bravo (WI)

Twenty20 International series
- Results: New Zealand won the 2-match series 2–0
Most runs	Luke Ronchi (99)	Andre Fletcher (63)
Most wickets	Nathan McCullum (5)	Tino Best (3)
- Player of the series: Luke Ronchi (NZ)

The West Indies cricket team toured New Zealand from 3 December 2013 to 15 January 2014, playing 3 Tests, 5 One Day Internationals and 2 Twenty20 Internationals against New Zealand. New Zealand won the three-Test series 2-0 and the T20Is 2–0. The ODI series was drawn 2-2.

== Squads ==
Test Squads New Zealand

- Aaron Redmond
- BJ Watling (wk)
- Brendon McCullum (c)
- Corey Anderson
- Doug Bracewell
- Hamish Rutherford
- Ish Sodhi
- Kane Williamson
- Neil Wagner
- Peter Fulton
- Ross Taylor
- Tim Southee
- Trent Boult

| West Indies

- Daren Sammy (c)
- Denesh Ramdin (wk)
- Tino Best
- Kraigg Brathwaite
- Darren Bravo
- Shivnarine Chanderpaul
- Sheldon Cottrell
- Narsingh Deonarine
- Kirk Edwards
- Shannon Gabriel
- Sunil Narine
- Veerasammy Permaul
- Kieran Powell
- Shane Shillingford
- Chadwick Walton
- Chris Gayle

ODI Squads

New Zealand	West Indies
Adam Milne	Chadwick Walton
Brendon McCullum (c)	Darren Bravo (withdrawn player)
Colin Munro	Daren Sammy (withdrawn player)
Corey Anderson	Denesh Ramdin (wk)
Jesse Ryder	Dwayne Bravo (c)
Jimmy Neesham	Jason Holder
Kane Williamson	Johnson Charles
Kyle Mills	Kirk Edwards
Luke Ronchi (wk)	Lendl Simmons
Martin Guptill	Marlon Samuels (withdrawn player)
Mitchell McClenaghan	Narsingh Deonarine
Ross Taylor	Sunil Narine
Nathan McCullum	Nikita Miller
	Ravi Rampaul
	Tino Best

== Test series ==
=== 1st Test ===
3–7 December
Scorecard

New Zealand	v	West Indies
609/9d (153.1 overs); Ross Taylor 217* (319); Tino Best 3/148 (34.1 overs)		213 (62.1 overs); Shivnarine Chanderpaul 76 (87); Tim Southee 4/52 (16 overs)
79/4 (30 overs); Corey Anderson 20* (43); Shane Shillingford 4/26 (15 overs)		507 (f/o) (162.1 overs); Darren Bravo 218 (416); Neil Wagner 3/112 (30 overs)

Match drawn
University Oval, Dunedin
Umpires: Nigel Llong (Eng) and Paul Reiffel (Aus)
Player of the match: Ross Taylor (NZ)

- West Indies won the toss and elected to field.
- Rain forced an early Tea interval and shortened play on day 5.
- Ross Taylor scored his maiden Test double-century and the 17th Test double-century by a New Zealand batsman.

=== 2nd Test ===
11–13 December
Scorecard

New Zealand	v	West Indies
441 (115.1 overs); Ross Taylor 129 (227); Tino Best 4/110 (21 overs)		193 (49.5 overs); Marlon Samuels 60 (81); Trent Boult 6/40 (15 overs)
		175 (f/o) (54.5 overs); Kieran Powell 36 (74); Trent Boult 4/40 (12.5 overs)

New Zealand won by an innings and 73 runs
Basin Reserve, Wellington
Umpires: Ian Gould (Eng) and Paul Reiffel (Aus)
Player of the match: Trent Boult (New Zealand)

- Rain delayed the start of play on day 2 and reduced play to 62.1 overs.

=== 3rd Test ===
19–22 December
Scorecard

West Indies	v	New Zealand
367 (116.2 overs); Shivnarine Chanderpaul 122* (229); Corey Anderson 3/47 (19 overs)		349 (117.3 overs); Ross Taylor 131 (264); Sunil Narine 6/91 (42.3 overs)
103 (31.5 overs); Daren Sammy 24 (17); Trent Boult 4/23 (10 overs)		124/2 (40.4 overs); Kane Williamson 56 (83); Daren Sammy 1/21 (9 overs)

New Zealand win by 8 wickets
Seddon Park, Hamilton
Umpires: Ian Gould (Eng) and Nigel Llong (Eng)
Player of the match: Ross Taylor (New Zealand)

- Tim Southee claimed his 100th Test wicket during West Indies's second innings by dismissing Veerasammy Permaul lbw.

== ODI series ==
=== 1st ODI ===
26 December 2013
Scorecard

New Zealand; 156 (42. overs)	v	West Indies; 157/8 (27.3 overs)
Brendon McCullum 51 (57); Dwayne Bravo 4/44 (10 overs)		Daren Sammy 43* (27); Mitchell McClenaghan 5/58 (9.3 overs)

West Indies won by 2 wickets
Eden Park, Auckland
Umpires: Gary Baxter (NZ) and Ranmore Martinesz (SL)
Player of the match: Daren Sammy (West Indies)

- West Indies won the toss and elected to field.

=== 2nd ODI ===
29 December 2013

New Zealand	v	West Indies

Match abandoned without a ball being bowled
McLean Park, Napier

=== 3rd ODI ===
1 January 2014
Scorecard

New Zealand; 283/4 (21 overs)	v	West Indies; 124/5 (21 overs)
Corey Anderson 131 (47); Jason Holder 2/48 (4 overs)		Dwayne Bravo 56* (54); Mitchell McClenaghan 2/7 (2 overs)

New Zealand won by 159 runs
Queenstown Events Centre, Queenstown
Umpires: Chris Gaffaney (SL) and Ranmore Martinesz (SL)
Player of the match: Corey Anderson (New Zealand)

- West Indies won the toss and elected to field.
- Match reduced to 21 overs per side due to rain.
- Corey Anderson (NZ) scored the fastest ODI century in 36 balls.
- Jesse Ryder (NZ) scored the 6th fastest ODI century in 46 balls.

=== 4th ODI ===
4 January
Scorecard

New Zealand; 285/6 (50 overs)	v	West Indies; 134/5 (33.4 overs)
Martin Guptill 81 (119); Dwayne Bravo 2/35 (7 overs)		Dwayne Bravo 43* (55); Mitchell McClenaghan 1/30 (6.4 overs)

New Zealand won by 58 runs (D/L)
Saxton Oval, Nelson
Umpires: Billy Bowden (Eng) and Ian Gould (Eng)
Player of the match: Martin Guptill (New Zealand)

- New Zealand won the toss and elected to bat.

=== 5th ODI ===
8 January
Scorecard

West Indies; 363/4 (50 overs)	v	New Zealand; 160 (29.5 overs)
Kirk Edwards 123* (108); Kane Williamson 1/30 (4 overs)		Corey Anderson 29 (24); Nikita Miller 4/45 (10 overs)

West Indies won by 203 runs
Seddon Park, Hamilton
Umpires: Chris Gaffaney (NZ) and Ranmore Martinesz (SL)
Player of the match: Dwayne Bravo (West Indies)

- New Zealand won the toss and elected to field.

== T20I Series ==
=== 1st T20I ===
11 January
Report

New Zealand; 189/5 (20 overs)	v	West Indies; 108/8 (20 overs)
Brendon McCullum 60* (45); Tino Best 3/40 (4 overs)		Andre Fletcher 23 (25); Nathan McCullum 4/24 (4 overs)

New Zealand won by 81 runs
Eden Park, Auckland
Umpires: Chris Gaffaney (NZ) and Derek Walker (NZ)
Player of the match: Luke Ronchi (NZ)

- New Zealand won the toss and elected to bat.
- Kieran Powell and Chadwick Walton made their T20I debut for West Indies.

=== 2nd T20I ===
15 January
Scorecard

West Indies; 159/5 (20 overs)	v	New Zealand; 163/6 (19 overs)
Denesh Ramdin 55* (31); Adam Milne 2/22 (4 overs)		Luke Ronchi 51* (28); Andre Russell 2/16 (3 overs)

New Zealand won by 4 wickets
Westpac Stadium, Wellington
Umpires: Gary Baxter (NZ) and Chris Gaffaney (NZ)
Player of the match: Luke Ronchi (NZ)

- West Indies won the toss and elected to bat.
- Jason Holder made his T20I debut for West Indies.

== Statistics ==
New Zealand

- Brendon McCullum made his 7th Test century in the 1st innings of the 1st Test.
- Ross Taylor made his 9th Test century and his 1st Test double-century in the 1st innings of the 1st Test. He made his highest Test score of 217*, this was also the highest number of runs for a New Zealand player at Dunedin.
- Ross Taylor made his 10th Test century in the 1st innings of the 2nd Test.
- Ross Taylor passed 4,000 Test runs in the 1st innings of the 2nd Test.
- Ross Taylor made his 11th Test century in the 1st innings of the 3rd Test.
- Tim Southee got his 100th Test wicket when he got Veerasammy Permaul out in the 2nd innings of the 3rd Test.
- Corey Anderson made fastest ever One Day International century in 3rd ODI.

West Indies

- Tino Best claimed his 50th Test wicket when he got Aaron Redmond out in the 1st innings of the 1st Test.
- Shivnarine Chanderpaul passed 11,000 Test runs in the 1st innings of the 1st Test.
- Darren Bravo made his 5th Test century in the 2nd innings of the 1st Test.
- Darren Bravo passed 2,000 Test runs in the 2nd innings of the 1st Test.
- Kieran Powell passed 1,000 Test runs in the 2nd innings of the 2nd Test.
- Denesh Ramdin made his 5th Test century in the 1st innings of the 3rd Test.
- Shivnarine Chanderpaul made his 29th Test century in the 1st innings of the 3rd Test.
