= Joe Moreno =

Joe Moreno may refer to:

- Proco Joe Moreno, member of the Chicago City Council
- Joe Moreno (Texas politician), member of the Texas House of Representatives
