= PVCC =

PVCC may refer to:

- Paradise Valley Community College, a public community college in Phoenix, Arizona
- Piedmont Virginia Community College, a public community college in Charlottesville, Virginia
- Prairie View Cricket Complex, Houston, Texas
