= Talmadge L. Heflin =

American politician (born 1940)

Member of the Texas House of Representatives from the 149th district
- In office January 11, 1983 – January 11, 2005
- Succeeded by: Hubert Vo

Personal details
- Born: Talmadge Loraine Heflin; January 16, 1940 (age 86) Webster Parish, Louisiana, U.S.
- Party: Republican
- Spouse: Janice Heflin (m. 1959)
- Children: 1

Talmadge Loraine Heflin (born January 16, 1940) is an American politician. He served as a Republican member for the 149th district of the Texas House of Representatives.

Born in Webster Parish, Louisiana, he is the son of Lucille Lee and Sam Heflin. Heflin moved to Houston, Texas in 1967, in which he had established his own business. He served as a school board member at Alief Independent School District, which later named an elementary school in his honor.

In 1983, Heflin won election in the 149th district of the Texas House of Representatives. In 2005, he was succeeded by Hubert Vo.

In 2008, he served as a Texas political elector for John McCain's campaign in his 2008 United States presidential election.
