= Piper Stege Nelson =

American anti-violence activist

- Born: United States of America
- Known for: American anti-violence activist

Piper Stege Nelson is an American anti-violence activist, born in the United States of America.

Nelson serves as executive director of I Live Here I Give Here, an Austin, Texas non-profit dedicated to local philanthropy. Nelson was named to the BBC 100 Women 2021 list for her work with The SAFE Alliance in Austin, where she oversaw all aspects of public outreach from 2017 to 2020. She has previously worked with Michelle Obama's Let Girls Learn initiative and Annie's List, a political action committee which recruits, trains, and supports progressive women running for office.

A native of Austin, Nelson is a 1997 graduate of Carleton College, where she received a bachelor's degree in women's studies and Spanish and was awarded a Fulbright Program grant. She earned her master's degree from the Lyndon B. Johnson School of Public Affairs at the University of Texas, Austin in 2020.
