= Chris Hollins =

Chris Hollins may refer to:

- Chris Hollins (politician) (born 1986), attorney and former Clerk of Harris County, Texas
- Chris Hollins (broadcaster) (born 1971), British journalist and sportsman
