= Prairie View Cricket Complex =

Cricket complex in Houston, Texas

- Logo of the complex

Ground information
- Location: Prairie View, Waller County, Texas
- Coordinates: 30°05′14.4″N 96°00′23.3″W
- Establishment: 2018; 7 years ago
- Capacity: 10,000
- Owner: Tanweer Ahmed
- Operator: Kalsoom Prairie View Cricket Association
- Tenants: Major League Cricket; Houston Hurricanes; Houston Cricket League; United States cricket team
- End names
- Forest End; Highway End

International information
- First T20I: 7 April 2024: United States v Canada
- Last T20I: 25 May 2024: United States v Bangladesh

Team information
Houston Cricket League	(2018)
Houston Hurricanes	(2021)
- As of 25 May 2024; Source: ESPNcricinfo

The Prairie View Cricket Complex (PVCC) is a group of six cricket grounds located in the city of Prairie View, part of the Greater Houston area, in Waller County, Texas, United States. The facility is joint-owned by Tanweer Ahmed and Major League Cricket.

== History ==
In January 2018, Houston developer David Wolff, along with Pakistani American businessman Tanweer Ahmed joint-purchased 86 acres of land in Prairie View, Texas, to build a cricket complex. Construction on the complex started by March 2018, in which two cricket grounds were scheduled to open by April 2018. They opened four more cricket grounds in September 2018 as part of its first phase. Upon opening, the complex hosted three cricket matches of the Houston Cricket League. By July of 2022, a total of 14 cricket grounds were opened at the venue.

In May 2019, the United States national cricket team played its first match at this venue. By July of that same year, six cricket grounds had opened. Construction continued throughout September of that year, before ending and being ready for use in December 2019. For the first half of 2020, it would be used as a venue for the Houston Cricket League, before being used by the Houston Hurricanes as their home ground for the exhibition league of Minor League Cricket.

It served as the host of the Houston Open 2021 (which was sanctioned by USA Cricket) in early April of that year. It also hosted the United States Men's Under-19 National Championship, in which the Mid-Atlantic Zone were crowned champions. Later that month, it was also announced by USA Cricket that the venue would become the first official Major League Cricket National Cricket Center, and, as part of their joint-venture deal, they would add eight new turf practice nets and wickets, upgrading three cricket pitches to a high-quality natural turf wicket, and build a cricket pavilion, which would cater for both men and women players. It was also announced that Tanweer Ahmed, along with PVCC Head of Operations, Mangesh Chaudhari would be added to the investor group in Major League Cricket, and that they both would also co-own the Houston Hurricanes, which was announced in August of the same year. Additionally, the venue hosted a series of practice games between two Major League Cricket squads, and a United States Training Group. The practice series featured the likes of Corey Anderson, Sami Aslam, Dane Piedt and more. Similarly, it was the home ground to the Houston Hurricanes during the inaugural season of Minor League Cricket from July 31 to September 12, 2021.

It was also announced on August 28, 2021, that the venue would be the host of the inaugural USA Cricket national men's 50-over championship, which took place from November 15-19, 2021 (changed from a November 12-20 schedule due to the revised schedule of the 2021 ICC Men's T20 World Cup Americas Qualifier).

In March 2022, it was announced that the venue would undergo a $3 million renovation ahead of MLC and the 2024 ICC Men's T20 World Cup. In May 2022, the venue hosted warm-up and practice games ahead of 2 ICC Cricket World Cup League 2 series at Moosa Stadium. Additionally, from June to July 2022, the venue was used again by the Hurricanes in their 2022 campaign of Minor League Cricket. In December of the same year, it was announced that the venue – alongside other venues such as Central Broward Stadium, Moosa Stadium, and the Grand Prairie Stadium – were likely to host matches in the 2024 ICC Men's T20 World Cup.

== Events ==
Upon opening in September 2018, the venue hosted matches of the Houston Cricket League throughout 2019 and 2020. The United States national cricket team played their first cricket match at this venue in May 2019. The following years, it was used as the Houston Hurricanes' home ground in both the exhibition league (in which Mayor David Allen was invited to see) and the inaugural season of Minor League Cricket. In April 2021, the venue hosted the USA Cricket-sanctioned Houston Open 2021, in which the Nepali Rhinos took the trophy. Later that month, it also hosted the United States Men's Under-19 National Championship, in which the Mid-Atlantic Zone was crowned champions. The same month, the venue hosted a series of practice matches between a United States Training Group and two Major League Cricket squads, which featured many international cricketers such as Shayan Jahangir, Dane Piedt, and others.

In August 2021, it was announced that the venue would be hosting the first inaugural United States Men's National Championship, which featured eight teams, and spanned from November 15-19, 2021 (changed from a November 12-20 schedule due to the revised schedule of the 2021 ICC Men's T20 World Cup Americas Qualifier).

The western ground in the complex hosted two official international series in April and May 2024, with the United States men's team playing Canada in a 5-match T20I series and Bangladesh in a 3-match T20I series.
