= Jesse Ryder =

New Zealand cricketer

Personal information
- Full name: Jesse Daniel Ryder
- Born: 6 August 1984 (age 42); Masterton, Wellington, New Zealand
- Height: 1.83 m (6 ft 0 in)
- Batting: Left-handed
- Bowling: Right-arm medium
- Role: All-rounder

International information
- National side: New Zealand (2008–2014)
- Test debut (cap 241): 17 October 2008 v Bangladesh
- Last Test: 9 December 2011 v Australia
- ODI debut (cap 146): 9 February 2008 v England
- Last ODI: 31 January 2014 v India
- ODI shirt no.: 77
- T20I debut (cap 29): 5 February 2008 v England
- Last T20I: 15 January 2014 v West Indies

Domestic team information
- Years: Team
- 2002/03–2003/04: Central Districts
- 2004/05–2012/13: Wellington
- 2007: Ireland
- 2009: Royal Challengers Bangalore
- 2011–2012: Pune Warriors
- 2013/14–2014/15: Otago
- 2014–2016: Essex
- 2015/16–2017/18: Central Districts
- 2017: St Lucia Stars

Career statistics
Competition	Test	ODI	FC	LA
Matches	18	48	131	178
Runs scored	1,269	1,362	8,784	5,592
Batting average	40.93	33.21	45.04	36.07
100s/50s	3/6	3/6	25/40	11/34
Top score	201	107	236	136
Balls bowled	492	407	9,398	1,859
Wickets	5	12	155	49
Bowling average	56.00	34.33	30.04	36.36
5 wickets in innings	0	0	7	0
10 wickets in match	0	0	2	0
Best bowling	2/7	3/29	6/47	4/39
Catches/stumpings	12/–	15/–	126/–	59/–
- Source: ESPNcricinfo, 10 January 2019

Jesse Daniel Ryder (born 6 August 1984) is a former international New Zealand cricketer, who played all forms of the game. He was primarily a middle-order batsman for Tests and an opening batsman in ODIs. Ryder also bowled useful medium-pace.

Ryder previously represented his country in the Under-19 Cricket World Cup of 2002. He played his domestic cricket with Wellington after crossing there from Central Districts in 2004 and was a member of their first-class and List A teams. In 2014 he had a successful county season for Essex County Cricket Club and returned in 2015.

== International career ==
=== Early career ===
On 30 January 2008, Ryder was chosen in the 12-man Twenty20 squad and the 13-man ODI squad to play England. New Zealand Cricket Selection Manager Richard Hadlee said "Jesse has the potential to provide an explosive start alongside Brendon McCullum at the top of the innings in both forms of the game." Ex-cricketer Adam Parore subsequently hit out at the selector's decision to pick Ryder, claiming that he was "too fat" and "in no fit state to play for New Zealand."

Ryder's 2007/08 season ended on 24 February 2008 when he badly cut his hand trying to break into a toilet at a Christchurch bar at 5:30am the day after New Zealand had won the one day series against England.

It was later revealed that Ryder had been drinking until 1:30 am the night before the fifth ODI against England (Ryder scored 24) and had been rude to staff at Christchurch hospital, demanding preferential treatment when he was being treated for his hand injury.

=== Late career ===
Ryder managed to get through the Indian tour without any further indiscretions. He was NZ's best batsman in the five ODIs, scoring 225 runs at an average of 56.25. He scored his first ODI century for New Zealand in the third match and was the man of the match in the fifth match for his all round performance, 3-29 and 63. His century (105) off 72 balls, was the third fastest ODI century for New Zealand. Ryder and McCullum enhanced their reputations as an opening partnership sharing two stands of over 100 in 4 innings, 166 in the third match and 102 in the 4th match.

In the second Test match at Napier, Ryder scored his maiden double century, (201) and put on 271 with Ross Taylor (151). This was a new record fourth wicket partnership against all countries and fourth highest test partnership ever for New Zealand. Ryder became the first New Zealander since Nathan Astle to score two centuries in two consecutive Test matches.

Ryder's contribution to the 2009 ICC World Twenty20 tournament was limited. He scored 31 off 12 balls against Scotland but then picked up a "particularly nasty groin infection", played no further part in the competition and was replaced in the squad by Aaron Redmond.

During the Indian first innings Ryder took the key wicket of Indian opener Gautam Gambhir. His return went well as he scored his third test century and his first outside New Zealand. This came while New Zealand were chasing a mammoth Indian first innings total of 429. He was engaged in a 194 run partnership with debutant Kane Williamson who finished the day on 87*. Ryder was given out lbw on the third ball of the final over of the third day; he scored 103.

=== Injuries ===
Ryder was injured from October 2009 to March 2010 and so did not play for New Zealand. In April 2010 he played a first class game for Wellington and scored 103. He was unable to make the August 2010 tour to Sri Lanka due to an elbow injury but was able to make the headlines on 7 August 2010 with yet another misconduct charge for intoxication.

=== Indefinite break from cricket ===
On 8 March 2012, Ryder decided to take an indefinite break from international cricket following injury concerns and a prolonged history of disciplinary issues.

In December 2012 despite good form, scoring 162 from 174 balls against Central Districts on 11 December, Ryder said he was still not ready to return to international cricket.

=== Return to international cricket ===
Ryder returned to international cricket when he was called up to the ODI squad to face West Indies. On 1 January 2014, Ryder and Corey Anderson at the Queenstown Events Centre broke some records: Anderson broke Shahid Afridi's 17-year-old record of the fastest ODI hundred by one ball, scoring his in 36 balls; he eventually ended with an unbeaten 131 that featured 14 sixes and 6 fours. Along with Ryder, they helped New Zealand set the team record for the most sixes in an ODI innings. Ryder scored the sixth fastest century with 104 in 46 balls with 5 sixes.

In 2013, he was re-called to the New Zealand side for the one day series against the West Indies on 19 December. During his first match at Eden Park Ryder scored a duck off 7 deliveries and did not bowl. With the second match at McLean Park, Napier being abandoned due to weather he went into the third match at Queenstown still having not scored a run. He responded in style hitting a century off 46 deliveries in a rain shortened 21 over match and along with Corey Anderson (who hit a world record 100 of 36 deliveries) put on over 200 runs for the 4th wicket in a final score of 283. Ryder enjoyed further success as the Blackcaps won the ODI series 4-1 and the T20 series 2–0.

Ryder was selected for the Blackcaps side to play India for the five match one day international series beginning 19 January 2014. Ryder was unable to score past 20 in five innings.

=== Doping ban ===
In August 2013, Ryder received a six-month ban for an anti-doping rule violation after testing positive for two prohibited stimulants (PBA and DEBEA).

== Personal issues ==
On 7 January 2009, Ryder indulged in a "late night drinking session" after the 3rd ODI against the West Indies. He missed a team meeting the following morning and was unable to train in the afternoon. He was subsequently dropped for the 4th ODI.

As Ryder had established a good record (Test Average: 49.33, ODI Average: 34.33) in his first season, New Zealand Cricket CEO Justin Vaughan was ready to help him with his drinking problem.

Ryder played in the 5th ODI on 13 January 2009, and scored 21. Two days later, Justin Vaughan and Ryder's manager Aaron Klee announced that Ryder had agreed to go cold turkey.

Ryder scored only 8 runs against South Africa, but in a must-win match for NZ against Sri Lanka he scored 74. When on 5 he pulled a leg abductor muscle and batted with a runner. Daniel Vettori, the New Zealand captain, felt the injury compelled Ryder to cut loose. "I just think he let out some frustration and it worked for us". He reached 50 in just 28 balls and scored his 74 off 58 balls. After being dismissed he whacked a chair with his bat and was fined 15% of his match fee for "abuse of cricket equipment or clothing, ground equipment or fixtures and fittings".

It was later revealed that the team manager, Dave Currie, gave Ryder a "dressing-down" for his behaviour and Ryder responded with a "tirade" of abuse, which resulted in misconduct charge on his return from South Africa. The hearing was held on 22 October 2009, on the same day Ryder was awarded the Redpath Cup. The punishment is not known.

Further alcohol incidents emerged during the India series. Ryder was filmed by patrons in an intoxicated state with Jimmy Neesham outside the 1885 Bar in Auckland's Britomart just hours after the Blackcaps secured a dramatic tie against India at Eden Park. On 5 February 2014, just hours after being named as the backup to Ross Taylor (who was expecting his second child) for the first test match against India the next day, Ryder was seen drinking along with Doug Bracewell at a pirate themed party occurring at the Car Park bar with More FM radio personalities. It was reported that Ryder left the bar at 2 am with the possibility of playing against India that very day. Their Blackcaps teammates were reportedly livid over the latest late night session and New Zealand Cricket (NZC) reacted furiously at the news. Ryder was subsequently dropped for the second test match against India beginning 14 February 2014 after this third incident. He was also omitted for the ICC T20 world cup to be held in Bangladesh during March on 'character grounds' due to his alcohol fuelled indiscretions.

Ryder returned to the Otago Volts to finish out the remainder of the New Zealand domestic series. His international career continued to remain in limbo when he was omitted from the side to tour the West Indies in July 2014, when it was announced on 15 April 2014. A statement from NZC said that Ryder had not satisfied the selectors that he had his off field issues under control.

== Christchurch bar attack ==
On 28 March 2013, it was reported by media, and later confirmed by police, that Ryder was in a critical condition at Christchurch Hospital after being assaulted outside the Aikman's Bar in Merivale, Christchurch in the early hours of that morning. It was reported that four men were involved in the attack, which spread from the bar into the carpark of the McDonald's restaurant across the street. It was reported that Ryder had suffered a fractured skull and a collapsed lung and was in a medically induced coma. However Ryder subsequently announced that his skull had not been fractured. By 31 March, two men were charged with the assault, and Ryder was moved out of intensive care.

In 2016 two men pleaded guilty to the assault: Craig Joseph O'Neill, 38, a builder, and his nephew Dylan James O'Neill, 22, a carpet layer.

New Zealand rapper Scribe made headlines when he suggested on his Twitter account that Ryder must have said something to prompt the attack. He later apologised for the remarks, and Ryder responded "Thanks again to everyone for the support esp my good mate Scribe. #NotManyIfAny".

Lawyers for the two men accused of the attack, who received name suppression, said Ryder had only been punched once, and his injuries were nowhere near as severe as what had been reported, despite his being put into a coma.

A man who posted video of Ryder's accused attackers on the internet was himself charged with breaching a suppression order. The man, Jordan Mason, pleaded guilty to uploading the clip to YouTube.

== Domestic career ==
On 6 February 2009, just before the Indian series kicked off, Ryder's services were bought by the Bangalore Royal Challengers for $US160,000 ($NZ318,280). However, he struggled during the season, scoring a total of 56 runs, and was only chosen to play in 5 out of 16 of his team's games. Ryder also "fell off the wagon after 100 hard-fought days of sobriety", according to the NZ Herald.

Ryder moved to the Otago Volts during the off season in 2013 citing a breakdown with his relationships with teammates at the Wellington Firebirds as the main reason. The move proved to be a success with Ryder scoring two centuries and two fifties upon his return from the doping ban between October and December 2013.

Beginning in the 2014 English season, Ryder was contracted to play for Essex. He took 43 wickets in his first season, and 44 in the 2015 season.

In November 2017, he scored his 25th century in first-class cricket, batting for Central Districts against Auckland in the 2017–18 Plunket Shield season.
