= Lina Hidalgo =

American politician (born 1991)

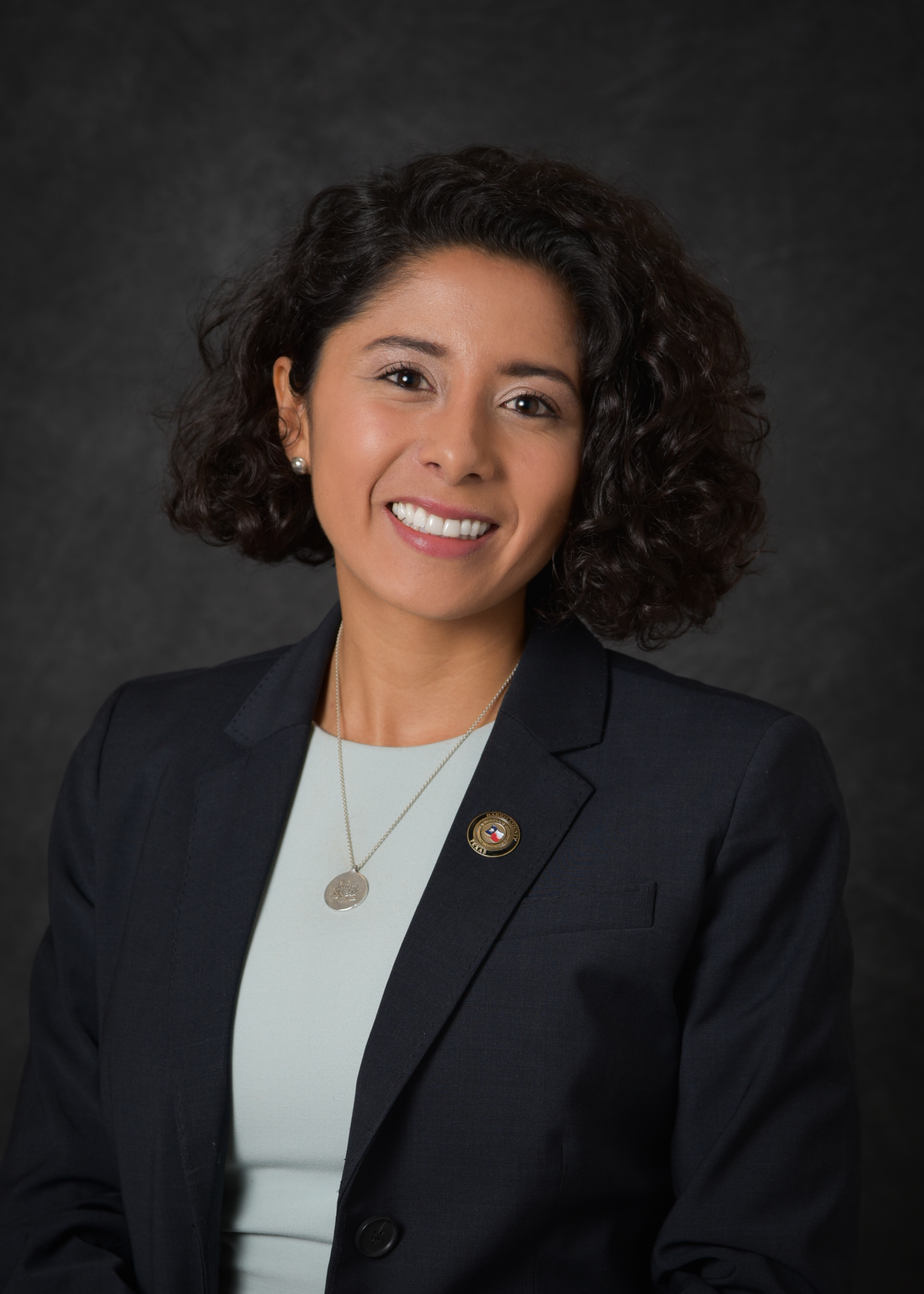
- Hidalgo in 2019

Harris County Judge
- Incumbent
- Assumed office January 1, 2019
- Preceded by: Ed Emmett

Personal details
- Born: February 19, 1991 (age 35) Bogotá, Colombia
- Party: Democratic
- Spouse: David James (m. 2024; sep. 2025)
- Education: Stanford University (BA)

Lina Maria Hidalgo (born February 19, 1991) is a Colombian-American politician who has served as the county judge of Harris County, Texas, the third-most populous county in the United States, since 2019. Hidalgo functions as the county's chief executive and its emergency manager. She oversees a budget of over $4 billion.

== Early life and career ==
Hidalgo was born in Bogota, Colombia, on February 19, 1991. Her family left Colombia when she was five years old, and lived in Peru and Mexico City before moving to Houston, Texas when she was 15.

Hidalgo graduated from Seven Lakes High School near Katy, Texas, and then attended Stanford University, graduating with a degree in political science in 2013. Her honors thesis was titled "Tiananmen or Tahrir? A Comparative Study of Military Intervention Against Popular Protest."

That same year, Hidalgo became a U.S. citizen. Upon graduation from Stanford, Hidalgo received the Omidyar Network Postgraduate Fellowship to work with an international organization. She moved to Thailand, where she worked for the Internews Network, an international nonprofit dedicated to training journalists and advocating for press freedom.

After returning to the U.S., Hidalgo worked as a medical interpreter at the Texas Medical Center in Houston and volunteered for the Texas Civil Rights Project. During this time, she was accepted into the MPP/JD joint program at the Harvard University Kennedy School of Government and New York University School of Law, respectively. Though Hidalgo originally planned to pursue a career in health care and criminal justice, the 2016 election inspired her to put her academic ambitions on hold and run for public office instead.

== County Judge of Harris County ==
=== 2018 election ===
Hidalgo ran for County Judge of Harris County in the 2018 elections. She was unopposed in the Democratic Party primary election and faced incumbent Ed Emmett in the general election. Hidalgo ran on a platform focused on flood control, criminal justice reform, and increasing transparency and accountability in local government. She defeated Emmett on November 6, becoming the first woman and Latina elected to the office of Harris County Judge. Her victory was considered an upset and attracted national attention, with a large and diverse coalition of activists and organizations leading her to a narrow 19,400-vote victory. The election also switched majority control of Harris County Commissioners Court, over which Hidalgo presides, from Republicans to Democrats.

=== Tenure ===
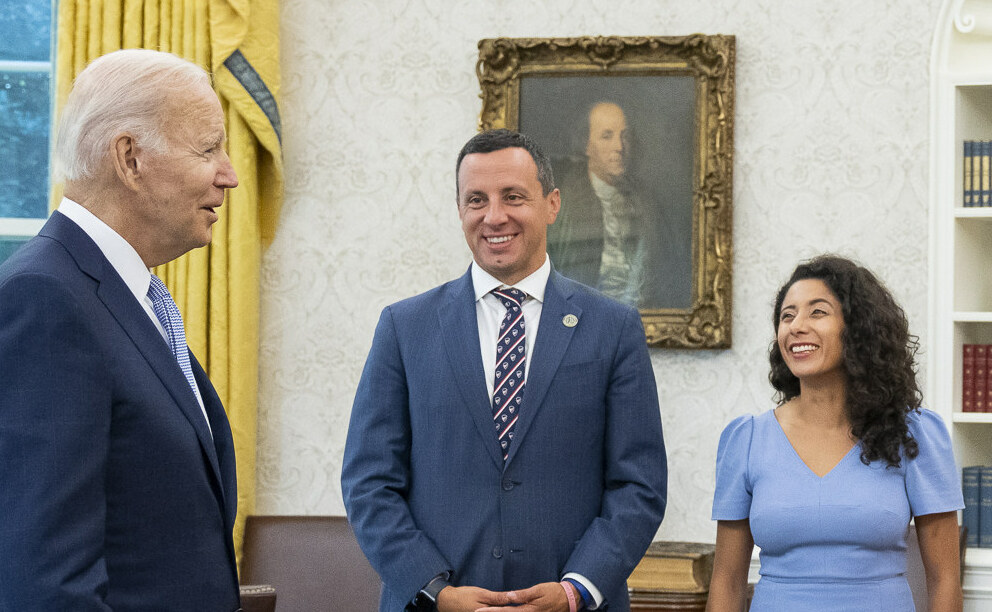
Hidalgo with President Joe Biden at the White House

Hidalgo championed misdemeanor cash bail reform in Harris County.

During the COVID-19 pandemic, Hidalgo implemented public health measures early in an attempt to halt the spread of the coronavirus. In March 2020, she ordered the closure of bars and restaurants. In April 2020, Hidalgo required Harris County residents to wear face masks in public. Republicans at the state and federal level strongly criticized her public health measures. Governor Greg Abbott said that local officials could not enforce mask mandates. By June, as cases in Texas climbed, Abbott ordered his own face mask mandate.

Hidalgo appeared in video montages during the 2020 Democratic National Convention.

Hidalgo has been credited with making voting easier in Harris County during the 2020 Texas elections and with increasing turnout among lower-propensity voters. By October 30, 2020 (the Thursday before election day), more votes had been cast in Texas than the entire number cast in the 2016 United States presidential election in Texas.

Hidalgo has filed a lawsuit against the Texas Department of Transportation to stop the expansion of Interstate 45 through Houston. Because of her intervention, the federal government is investigating whether this proposed expansion, which could increase pollution and relocate people, violates any environmental and civil rights laws. The County later paused the lawsuit to negotiate with TxDOT.

In December 2019, Hidalgo was named one of Forbes 30 under 30 in Law and Policy.

=== Alleged bid rigging ===
In March 2021, concerns were raised over a contract awarded to Elevate Strategies, a company that was hired to do COVID-19 vaccine outreach. The company had only one employee and was run out of an apartment in the city. Hidalgo and county commissioners allegedly had ties to Elevate Strategies. Mark Jones of Rice University said, "This was an RFP [request for proposal] that was wired from the very start to go to Elevate Strategies to provide political money for Lina Hidalgo's supporters". Hidalgo responded, "Y’all bring it on! Bring it on! Because there is nothing here." In September 2021, the county terminated the $11 million contract.

In April 2022, three of Hidalgo's staffers were indicted by the Harris County District Attorney. On November 9, 2023, the Texas Rangers issued three more search warrants in the ongoing investigation and the Rangers opened a new public corruption investigation into Hidalgo's office to locate records they believe were not disclosed, possibly destroyed, in prior investigations.

In March 2024, DA Kim Ogg lost her primary election. Prior to leaving office, Ogg transferred the case to the Texas Attorney General's Office. On January 29, 2025, the Texas Attorney General's Office filed a motion to dismiss all charges in the “interest of justice.”

=== 2022 election ===
Hidalgo defeated her opponent, Alex Mealer, by a margin of around 18,000 votes out of 1 million votes cast (50.8% to 49.2%). Mealer filed a lawsuit in an attempt to overturn the results, but dropped the lawsuit ten months later.

=== Bilingual constituency relations ===
Hidalgo was criticized after a March 2019 news conference in which she spoke in English and Spanish about the health implications of a massive chemical fire. She was addressing constituents and reporters from English- and Spanish-language media outlets. A Chambers County commissioner, Mark Tice, posted on social media: "English, this is not Mexico."

In response, Hidalgo's director of communications issued a statement noting that a third of Harris County residents are Spanish speakers:

Judge Hidalgo represents all of Harris County and given the county's composition and her bilingual skills, she will continue to communicate as broadly as possible especially when public safety is at stake.

NBC News reported that there was "immediate backlash" to Tice's comments; he later published an apology to Hidalgo on Facebook.

=== Recognition ===
Hidalgo was featured on the cover of Time in January 2018 alongside dozens of other women who ran for office in one of the biggest elections for women.

In 2022, Hidalgo was honored by the Carnegie Corporation of New York's Great Immigrant Award.

In 2023, as part of her Vogue interview, Hidalgo said “I’m an immigrant who was elected five years after becoming a US citizen. I’m a woman who’s five two on a good day, and I don’t straighten my hair, and I was elected at 27. All that means someone else—someone from whatever background—can do whatever it is they want to do.”

=== Censure ===
On August 7, 2025, the Harris County Commissioners Court censured Hidalgo 3–1 over decorum after her failed tax hike proposal. The censure followed a contentious discussion on August 7, 2025, when Hidalgo engaged in repeated interruptions of fellow commissioners and decorum disputes during debate over a proposed property tax increase intended to fund early childhood programs. Commissioners also noted instances in which Hidalgo encouraged children in attendance to participate in the proceedings and used profane language in the presence of a minor during an earlier meeting on June 26, 2025. The censure for Hidalgo did not come with any punishment, but it goes in the court record that the judge failed to acknowledge points of order.

=== Retirement announcement ===
On September 16, 2025, Hidalgo announced that she would not seek a third term as Harris County Judge.

=== Houston rodeo incident ===
On March 10, 2026, Hidalgo attended the annual Houston Rodeo to view a concert by country music artist Megan Moroney. As a local government official she has complimentary access to box seats, but she had previously been granted access to the exclusive "chute-seats" near the area floor for other events. When she and her guests attempted to access the "chute-seats" she was told that she would not be accommodated. An altercation ensued in which Hidalgo alleged that she was "manhandled", "disrespected" and made to feel "physically unsafe". Rodeo officials have denied her allegations, and the Rodeo's executive committee stripped Hidalgo of her ex-officio director title. The incident has led some local officials to call for her resignation.

== Personal life ==
She completed an Ironman Triathlon in November 2022.

Beginning in August 2023, Hidalgo took a two-month leave of absence to receive treatment for clinical depression in an in-patient facility.

Hidalgo's husband, David James, works as a civil rights and personal injury attorney. They married in November 2024. In December 2025, the couple announced their separation.

== Electoral history ==
November 2018 Harris County Judge election
Party	Candidate	Votes	%	±%
Democratic	Lina Hidalgo	595,221	49.78%	+49.78%
Republican	Ed Emmett	575,944	48.16%	−35.22%
Libertarian	Eric Gatlin	24,634	2.06%	+2.06%
Total votes		1,195,799	100.0%	N/A

November 2022 Harris County Judge election
Party	Candidate	Votes	%	±%
Democratic	Lina Hidalgo	552,903	50.82%	+1.04%
Republican	Alexandra del Moral Mealer	534,720	49.15%	+0.99%
Write-in	Naoufal Houjami	241	0.02%	+0.02%
Total votes		1,087,864	100.0%	N/A

== See also ==
- Christopher G. Hollins – appointed county clerk under Hidalgo's government involved in the 2020 U.S. elections
