= Canadian cricket team in the United States in 2024 =

International cricket tour

Canada men's cricket team in the United States in 2024
	United States	Canada
- Dates: 7 – 13 April 2024
Captains	Monank Patel (Note: Aaron Jones captained United States in the fifth T20I.)	Saad Bin Zafar

Twenty20 International series
- Results: United States won the 5-match series 4–0
Most runs	Monank Patel (120)	Aaron Johnson (124)
Most wickets	Harmeet Singh (6); Shadley van Schalkwyk (6)	Saad Bin Zafar (5)
- Player of the series: Harmeet Singh (USA)

The Canada men's cricket team toured the United States in April 2024 to play five Twenty20 International (T20I) matches. The series formed part of both teams' preparation ahead of the 2024 ICC Men's T20 World Cup.

United States won the series 4–0.

== Squads ==
United States	Canada
Monank Patel (c, wk); Aaron Jones (vc); Corey Anderson; Andries Gous (wk); Nosthush Kenjige; Milind Kumar; Nitish Kumar; Saurabh Netravalkar; Nisarg Patel; Usman Rafiq; Gajanand Singh; Harmeet Singh; Jessy Singh; Steven Taylor; Shadley van Schalkwyk	Saad Bin Zafar (c); Dilpreet Bajwa; Uday Bhagwan; Navneet Dhaliwal; Nikhil Dutta; Dillon Heyliger; Aaron Johnson; Rishiv Joshi; Ammar Khalid; Nicholas Kirton; Parveen Kumar; Shreyas Movva (wk); Pargat Singh; Harsh Thaker; Srimantha Wijeratne (wk)

The United States named former New Zealand international Corey Anderson in their squad. The squad also included former Canada captain Nitish Kumar and India under-19s player Harmeet Singh Baddhan, as well as former South Africa under-19s player Andries Gous.

== T20I series ==
=== 1st T20I ===
7 April 2024
10:00
Scorecard

Canada; 132 (20 overs)	v	United States; 133/4 (17.3 overs)
Saad Bin Zafar 29 (16); Nosthush Kenjige 3/21 (4 overs)		Monank Patel 50 (34); Dillon Heyliger 2/30 (3.3 overs)

United States won by 6 wickets
Prairie View Cricket Complex, Houston
Umpires: Jermaine Lindo (USA) and Vijaya Mallela (USA)
Player of the match: Nosthush Kenjige (USA)

- United States won the toss and elected to field.
- Andries Gous, Nosthush Kenjige, Milind Kumar, Harmeet Singh, Shadley van Schalkwyk (USA) and Uday Bhagwan (Can) all made their T20I debuts.
- This was the first men's T20I to be played at the venue.
- Canada submitted a formal complaint to match referee Reon King regarding scoring errors in both innings.

=== 2nd T20I ===
9 April 2024
15:00
Scorecard

United States; 230/3 (20 overs)	v	Canada; 199 (19.4 overs)
Monank Patel 68 (35); Saad Bin Zafar 1/28 (3 overs)		Aaron Johnson 74 (40); Harmeet Singh 2/14 (2.4 overs)

United States won by 31 runs
Prairie View Cricket Complex, Houston
Umpires: Aditya Gajjar (USA) and Vijaya Mallela (USA)
Player of the match: Monank Patel (USA)

- Canada won the toss and elected to field.
- Parveen Kumar (Can) made his T20I debut.
- This was the highest total for United States in a men's T20I innings.

=== 3rd T20I ===
10 April 2024
15:00
Scorecard

United States	v	Canada

Match abandoned
Prairie View Cricket Complex, Houston
Umpires: Aditya Gajjar (USA) and Jermaine Lindo (USA)

- No toss.
- No play was possible due to a wet outfield.

=== 4th T20I ===
12 April 2024
10:00
Scorecard

United States; 159/6 (20 overs)	v	Canada; 145/6 (20 overs)
Steven Taylor 39 (24); Dillon Heyliger 2/22 (4 overs)		Dilpreet Bajwa 52 (41); Harmeet Singh 4/18 (4 overs)

United States won by 14 runs
Prairie View Cricket Complex, Houston
Umpires: Jermaine Lindo (USA) and Vijaya Mallela (USA)
Player of the match: Harmeet Singh (USA)

- Canada won the toss and elected to field.
- Corey Anderson played in his first T20I for United States after previously playing 31 T20Is for New Zealand, becoming the eighteenth cricketer to represent two international teams in men's T20Is.

=== 5th T20I ===
13 April 2024
10:00
Scorecard

Canada; 168/5 (20 overs)	v	United States; 169/6 (19.4 overs)
Harsh Thaker 38 (24); Shadley van Schalkwyk 2/42 (4 overs)		Nitish Kumar 64 (38); Harsh Thaker 2/20 (4 overs)

United States won by 4 wickets
Prairie View Cricket Complex, Houston
Umpires: Jermaine Lindo (USA) and Vijaya Mallela (USA)
Player of the match: Nitish Kumar (USA)

- Canada won the toss and elected to bat.
- Usman Rafiq (USA) made his T20I debut.
- Nitish Kumar played in his first T20I for United States after previously playing 18 T20Is for Canada, becoming the nineteenth cricketer to represent two international teams in men's T20Is.
