= Uday Bhagwan =

Canadian cricketer

Personal information
- Full name: Uday Bhagwan Singh
- Born: 30 November 2001 (age 24); Toronto, Canada
- Batting: Right-handed
- Bowling: Right-arm fast medium
- Role: Bowler

International information
- National side: Canada
- ODI debut (cap 96): 8 February 2024 v Nepal
- Last ODI: 5 March 2024 v UAE
- T20I debut (cap 68): 7 April 2024 v USA
- Last T20I: 9 April 2024 v USA
- Source: Cricinfo, 7 April 2024

Uday Bhagwan (born 30 November 2001) is a Canadian cricketer. He primarily plays as a bowler.

== International career ==
In February 2024 he was named Canada's squad for their ODI series against Nepal. He made his One Day International (ODI) debut for Canada against Nepal on 8 February 2024.

In April 2024, he was named to the national squad for their T20I series against United States. He made his Twenty20 International (T20I) debut against United States on 7 April 2024.
