= Renault Robinson =

American police officer (1942–2023)

- Robinson, 1970.
- Born: Renault Alvin Robinson; September 8, 1942; Chicago, Illinois, U.S.
- Died: July 8, 2023 (aged 80); Chicago, Illinois, U.S.
- Police career
- Country: United States
- Department: Chicago Police Department
- Service years: 1964–1983
- Rank: Sworn in as an officer – 1964
- Other work: Chairman of the Chicago Housing Authority, 1983–1987.

Renault Alvin Robinson (September 8, 1942 – July 8, 2023) was an American police officer who served at the Chicago Police Department from 1964 to 1983. Robinson served as chairman of the Chicago Housing Authority under the leadership of former Chicago Mayor Harold Washington from August 1983 until January 1987. He was most known for founding the African American Patrolman's League. During his career as a police officer, Robinson was responsible for bringing a civil rights lawsuit against the Chicago Police Department for discrimination against minorities (African Americans and Latinos).

== Biography ==
Renault Alvin Robinson was born as the oldest of eight children in Chicago, Illinois, to Mabel (née Stevenson) and Robert Robinson. He was raised in the Woodlawn neighborhood on the city's south side. Robinson attended Corpus Christi Catholic church, attending and graduating from Corpus Christi Grammar School in 1956. For high school, Robinson first attended Corpus Christi High School for two years and later graduated from Hyde Park High School (now Hyde Park Academy High School) in 1960. After high school, Robinson worked in his father's printing shop as well as for other printing companies from 1960 until 1964.

=== Chicago Police Department ===
External audio
- Renault Robinson talks with Studs Terkel on WFMT; 1971, 5:42, Radio Diaries

Robinson took the Chicago Civil Service Commission written police exam in 1963. Robinson joined the Chicago Police Department in 1964, and was involved in providing police protection for the September 4, 1966, march on Cicero, Illinois. In 1968 Robinson co-founded the Chicago Police Department's Afro-American Patrolmen’s League (Later known as the Afro American Police League and now known as the African American Police League), an organization aimed at improving police service to the black community and at getting more blacks into policymaking positions in the department. The formation of the AAPL led to an increase in minority officers and civil rights lawsuits against the CPD for the discrimination of African American and Hispanic citizens. It also was a costly move for Robinson. Before the founding of the AAPL, Robinson was considered a model policeman with a 97% efficiency rating and had won more than 50 citations for outstanding police work. After the founding of the AAPL, Robinson and other members were often suspended, brought up on charges for minor infractions, reassigned to less desirable positions and threatened with dismissal from the police force as the CPD hoped to dismantle the organization. This included assigning Robinson to patrol the alley behind police headquarters, an assignment cited by Judge Prentice Marshall when finding that Robinson had been discriminated against by the CPD. Robinson nevertheless remained on the force and spoke out against racism in the police department criticizing events such as a raid that resulted in the murder of Black Panther Party member Fred Hampton and a dragnet operation ran by infamous Chicago police commander Jon Burge that resulted in a military-like occupation of Chicago's South Side. These and other tribulations were disclosed in an interview by Studs Terkel in his 1972 book titled, "Working". Despite the hardships in the department Robinson however was backed by Harold Washington, a member of the Illinois House of Representatives who would become Chicago's first African American mayor.

=== Chicago Housing Authority ===
In August 1983, Robinson resigned from the police force when he was appointed to chair the Chicago Housing Authority by newly elected African-American Mayor Harold Washington. During his first few months as chairman, he made a number of controversial decisions. He was criticized for the firing of the authority's elevator mechanics and maintenance personnel without having adequate replacements, which caused problems for residents living in high-rise buildings. In October, Robinson was stripped of day-to day authority for many reasons; but notably for the hiring of friends, relatives and associates in top authority positions. By end of 1983, his yearly salary was reduced from $60,000 to $30,000. In 1984, Robinson began a political war with the new executive director Zirl Smith for control over the Chicago Housing Authority which lasted for three years. In January 1987, a week after Smith resigned as executive director, Robinson resigned as chairman.

=== Later career and death ===
In 1989, Robinson pursued a business career in temporary staffing and became vice president of ASI Personnel Service before founding his own agency, Renault Robinson Staffing, in 2000. Robinson died in Chicago on July 8, 2023, at the age of 80.

== Personal life ==
Robinson was married to Annette from 1966 until his death in 2023. They had four children. He is survived by his wife, Annette, five of his siblings, his four sons, ten grandchildren, and two great-grandchildren. He was Catholic.
