= Ana Hernandez =

American politician (born 1978)

- Hernandez in 2025

Member of the Texas House of Representatives from the 143rd district
- Incumbent
- Assumed office December 20, 2005
- Preceded by: Joe Moreno

Personal details
- Born: August 25, 1978 (age 48) Reynosa, Mexico
- Party: Democratic
- Spouse: Ramsy Hernandez
- Occupation: Attorney
- Website: Office website

Ana E. Hernandez (born August 25, 1978) is a Democratic member of the Texas House of Representatives. Since her election in 2005 (in a special election filling the unexpired term of Rep. Joe Moreno, who was killed in a car crash in May 2005), she has represented District 143, part of Houston including areas of Magnolia, Manchester, Port Houston, Cimarron and Denver Harbor, the cities of Galena Park and Jacinto City, and portions of Pasadena and Channelview.

== Personal life and education ==
Hernandez was born in Reynosa, Mexico. She was brought to the US while still an infant, as her parents had work visas. Her parents overstayed their visas, but Hernandez became a permanent resident and eventually a citizen after the Immigration Reform and Control Act of 1986. Hernandez was raised in Pasadena, Texas, where she attended Sam Rayburn High School. She earned a bachelor's degree from the University of Houston, majoring in political science and psychology. She then attended the University of Texas, earning a J.D. Hernandez has one son. Hernandez attended a Peace Corps summer internship in South Africa, and also studied abroad in China and Sydney, Australia.

== Career ==
Before being elected herself, Hernandez worked for Texas state representatives Jessica Farrar and Joe E. Moreno, and also interned for state senator Rodney Ellis. Hernandez was first elected to the Texas House of Representatives in a special election in 2005. Hernandez is a member of the County Affairs Committee and the Judiciary & Civil Jurisprudence Committee.

Hernandez strongly supported the Texas "sanctuary city bill" that would prohibit police from enforcing federal immigration law. As a state representative, she participated in the 2025 Texas walkout, leaving the state in hopes of denying quorum for Republican efforts to pass a modified congressional gerrymander mid-decade.

Hernandez is also an attorney at Mostyn Law Firm, and serves on the board of directors of the Hispanic Bar Association of Houston.
