= Robert Gallegos =

American politician (born 1957/58)

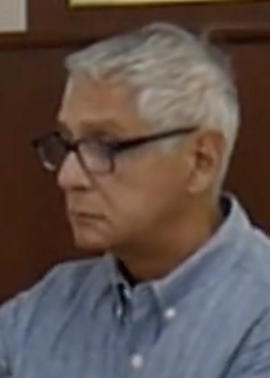

Member of Houston City Council for District I
- In office January 2, 2014 – January 2, 2024
- Preceded by: James G. Rodriguez
- Succeeded by: Joaquin Martinez

Personal details
- Born: 1957 or 1958 (age 68–69) Houston, Texas, U.S.
- Party: Democratic
- Education: Houston Community College; Ashford University

Robert Gallegos is a Texas politician who represented District I on the Houston City Council from 2014 to 2024. He was the first openly gay Latino city councilor in Texas history.

== Background ==
Gallegos was born at Parkview Hospital in Houston, Texas, and was raised in Magnolia Park. A graduate of Stephen F. Austin High School, he would later attend Houston Community College and receive a bachelors degree from Ashford University. Additionally, he is a graduate of Spencer School of Real Estate. He has 2 older brothers, and is openly gay.

== Political career ==
=== City Council ===
On January 2, 2014, Gallegos was sworn in to represent District I of the Houston City Council becoming the first openly gay Latino city councilor in Texas history. He succeeded James G. Rodriguez.

During his 2015 re-election campaign, Gallegos opponent, Herlina Garcia, claimed that Gallegos physically assaulted her while she was campaigning outside of a polling station at Houston Community College. Garcia claims that her and Gallegos were outside of the polling station speaking to voters when he approached her and began insulting her. He then, according to Garcia, "came back behind me and hit me on my back, and pushed me so hard that for about an hour I felt something on my left side." According to Garcia, she cried and since she was and elderly woman this was a "classic example" of abuse. Gallegos declined to be interviewed over the alleged incident; however, his office issued a statement saying that the allegations were false. Garcia filed a report with the Houston Police Department, charges were never filed. Gallegos went on to win the election with 57.3% of the votes cast.

On November 5, 2019, Gallegos was re-elected for his 3rd term, defeating Richard Gonzales with 67.1% of the votes.

=== Policies ===
Gallegos is affiliated with the Democratic Party.

He is often known with his advocation of green spaces and funds to improve parks, sports arenas, bike trails, and the construction of dog parks and canoe launches. This included funding to restore the historic Gus Wortham Park Golf Course, and construct the first botanic Gardiner in Houston. On the issue of immigration, he was opposed to Texas Senate Bill 4 which banned sanctuary cities in Texas.
