= Tanweer Ahmed =

Pakistani-American businessman and philanthropist (born 1969)

- Born: January 21, 1969 (age 57); Sialkot, Pakistan
- Occupations: Businessman, investor, philanthropist
- Years active: 1988–present
- Known for: Cricket development in the United States

Tanweer Ahmed (born January 21, 1969) is a Pakistani-American businessman, investor, and philanthropist known for his involvement in the development of cricket infrastructure in the United States. He is the owner of the Prairie View Cricket Complex in Texas and an investor in Major League Cricket.

== Early life ==
Ahmed was born in Sialkot, Pakistan. In 1969, he moved to the United States, where he began working in the restaurant industry before expanding into transportation and logistics businesses.

== Business career ==
Ahmed established businesses in the food and transportation sectors after relocating to the United States. He is associated with PAK Foods and National Consolidated Couriers Inc., operating in the retail and logistics industries.

According to coverage in regional and national media, Ahmed developed the Prairie View Cricket Complex in Texas.

== Cricket involvement ==
Ahmed is the owner of the Houston Hurricanes cricket franchise, which competes in Minor League Cricket in the United States.

He has been reported as an investor in Major League Cricket.

Media outlets including The Washington Post have reported on the growth of cricket in Texas, including reference to Ahmed’s involvement.

Ahmed has been mentioned in coverage related to the expansion of cricket infrastructure in the United States, particularly in connection with Major League Cricket development initiatives in Texas.

== Philanthropy ==
Ahmed has been involved in charitable initiatives in the Houston area.

In 2023, Ahmed pledged US$9 million toward the development of an information technology tower at the National University of Sciences and Technology (NUST) in Islamabad.

== Selected writings ==
Ahmed has authored opinion articles in The Nation, including:

- "Pakistan's Missing Export: 120 Million Young Hands". The Nation. 11 December 2025.
- "The Indus River Crisis: A Call to Action for Pakistan". The Nation. 21 May 2025.
- "Balancing Giants: Pakistan's Strategic Response to a Fragmenting Global Order". The Nation. 5 June 2025.
- "Pakistan's Perspective on India's Abeyance of Indus Waters Treaty". The Nation. 3 September 2025.
- "Pakistan Riverine Groundwater and Integrated Water Resource Strategy for Water and Food Security". The Nation. 20 September 2025.
- "Pakistan's Schools Need Think Like Ad Astra". The Nation. 1 November 2025.
- "Wisdom Command". The Nation. 17 November 2025.
- "Transparency Can Sustain Production". The Nation. 2 December 2025.
- "Pakistan Needs Shared Boardroom". The Nation. 18 January 2026.

Ahmed has authored opinion articles on geopolitics, economic policy, and regional affairs. His columns have appeared in publications including The Nation, Samaa TV, and Daily Times.

- "New Provinces, Old Rules: A Recipe For Failure". bloompakistan.com. 20 August 2026.
- "Fix Article, Reflections: Fix The 41 Words That Run The country". bloompakistan.com. 24 August 2026.
- "New Provinces, Old Rules? A Recipe for the Same Failure". bloompakistan.com. 20 August 2026.
- "The province debate: Timing is the trap". samaa.tv. 29 August 2026.
- "Abraham Accords, Pakistan and Kashmir". minutemirror.com.pk. 16 July 2026.

== See also ==
- Major League Cricket
- Minor League Cricket
- Prairie View Cricket Complex
