= Houston Hurricanes (cricket) =

Houston-based cricket team in Minor League Cricket

- League: Minor League Cricket
- Conference: Pacific Conference (Central Division)

Personnel
- Captain: Usman Rafiq
- Owner: Tanweer Ahmed; Mangesh Chaudhari

Team information
- City: Houston, Texas
- Colours: Red, and Black.
- Founded: 2020; 6 years ago
- Home ground: Prairie View Cricket Complex
T20 kit

The Houston Hurricanes are an American professional Twenty20 cricket team based in the Greater Houston area that competes in Minor League Cricket (MiLC). It was formed in 2020 as part of 24 original teams to compete in MiLC. The franchise is owned by Tanweer Ahmed and Mangesh Chaudhari.

The team's home ground is Prairie View Cricket Complex, located in Prairie View, Texas. Usman Rafiq was named as captain, while Willem Ludick was named as vice-captain for the team.

The current leading run-scorer is Willem Ludick, with the highest wicket-taker being Karthik Gattepalli.

== Franchise history ==
=== Background ===
Talks of an American Twenty20 league started in November 2018 just before USA Cricket became the new governing body of cricket in the United States. In May 2021, USA Cricket announced they had accepted a bid by American Cricket Enterprises (ACE) for a US$1 billion investment covering the league and other investments benefitting the U.S. national teams.

In an Annual General Meeting on February 21, 2020, it was announced that USA Cricket was planning to launch Major League Cricket in 2021 and Minor League Cricket that summer, but it was delayed due to the COVID-19 pandemic and due to the lack of high-quality cricket stadiums in the USA. Major League Cricket was pushed to a summer-2023 launch and Minor League Cricket was pushed back to July 31, 2021.

USA Cricket CEO Iain Higgins pointed out cities such as New York City, Houston and Los Angeles with a large cricket fanbase, and targeted them among others as launch cities for Minor League Cricket.

=== Exhibition league ===
In July 2020, the player registration for the Minor League Cricket exhibition league began. On August 15, 2020, USA Cricket announced the teams participating in the exhibition league matches, also listing the owners for each team. The draft for the exhibition league began on August 22, 2020, with the Houston Hurricanes releasing their squad on August 24. Usman Rafiq was later named as captain for the Houston Hurricanes in the exhibition league.

The exhibition matches kicked off on September 12, with the Houston Hurricanes losing their first match to the Irving Mustangs by 75 runs. The Houston Hurricanes then went on to concede 3 wins and 2 losses, placing 3rd throughout the exhibition league in the Central Division.

=== 2021 season ===
After the conclusion of the exhibition league, USA Cricket announced that they were planning to launch the inaugural season of Minor League Cricket in spring 2021. Ahead of the official season, which was announced to kick off on July 31, they announced Usman Rafiq as captain and Willem Ludick as vice-captain.

In their first match of the season, the Houston Hurricanes defeated the Austin Athletics chasing down a total of 175 in the 20th over, winning the match by 3 wickets. They then went on to win their next 3 games by 4 wickets, 50 runs, and 76 runs respectively, until they went on to concede their first loss of the season against the Michigan Cricket Stars. Over the following weeks, the Houston Hurricanes won 8 more matches, and lost 2 more matches, thus qualifying them for the quarter-finals.

In the quarter-finals, they faced the Golden State Grizzlies in a best-of-three series, losing the series 2-0, and placing 3rd in the league.

=== 2022 season ===
Ahead of the 2022 season, MLC announced that the draft for that season would take place on May 12.

In January 2023, MLC announced that the Hurricanes would play a three-game series at the Quetta Gladiators of the Pakistan Super League.

== Current squad ==
- Players with international caps are listed in **bold**.

Name	Nationality	Birth date	Batting style	Bowling style	Year signed	Notes
Batsmen
Ahsan Shah	United States	27 May 1995 (age 31)	Right-handed	Right-arm medium	2021	
Ali Samad	United States	5 July 1997 (age 29)	Right-handed	Right-arm medium	2021	
Majjid Zubair	United States	13 September 2000 (age 26)	Right-handed	Right-arm leg-break	2021	
**Heath Richards**	United States	1 March 2001 (age 25)	Right-handed	Left-arm medium	2025	
Rishi Ramesh	United States	20 July 2003 (age 23)	Right-handed	Right-arm medium	2021	
Slade van Staden	United States	30 April 2003 (age 23)	Right-handed	Right-arm leg-break	2021	Overseas
**Usman Rafiq**	United States	13 August 1988 (age 38)	Right-handed	Right-arm off break	2020	
Willem Ludick	South Africa	20 March 1997 (age 29)	Right-handed	Right-arm medium	2021	Overseas captain
All-rounders
**Ali Khan**	United States	13 December 1988 (age 37)	Right-handed	Right-arm medium	2020	
**Ashley Nurse**	Barbados	22 December 1988 (age 37)	Right-handed	Right-arm off break	2021	Overseas
Derwish Ali	United States	15 July 1991 (age 35)	Right-handed	Right-arm fast	2021	
Haris Qureshi	United States	11 February 1983 (age 43)	Right-handed	Right-arm medium	2021	
Karthik Gattepalli	United States	25 April 2000 (age 26)	Left-handed	Left-arm orthodox spin	2021	
Shuja Naqvi	United States	16 June 1992 (age 34)	Right-handed	Right-arm medium	2020	
Sudhir Hinge	United States	19 July 1992 (age 34)	Right-handed	Right-arm fast medium	2021	
**Sushant Modani**	United States	5 January 1989 (age 37)	Right-handed	Right-arm off break	2021	
**Waleed Ahmed**	Pakistan	4 December 1992 (age 33)	Right-handed	Right-arm off break	2020	Overseas
Rayaan Bhagani	United States	27 March 2005 (age 21)	Right-handed	Medium pacer	2020	
Wicket-keepers
Rana Ali	United States	28 December 1999 (age 26)	Right-handed	Right-arm medium	2020	Overseas
**Saqlain Haider**	United Arab Emirates	10 August 1987 (age 39)	Left-handed		2020	Overseas

== See also ==
- Minor League Cricket
- Major League Cricket
