= Joe Moreno (Texas politician) =

American politician (1964–2005)

Member of the Texas House of Representatives from the 143rd district
- In office November 9, 1998 – May 6, 2005
- Preceded by: Gerard Torres
- Succeeded by: Ana Hernandez

Personal details
- Born: August 12, 1964 Houston, Texas, U.S.
- Died: May 6, 2005 (aged 40) La Grange, Texas, U.S.
- Party: Democratic
- Education: Texas Southern University (BA)

Joe Ernest Moreno was an American politician. He was a former Democratic member of the Texas House of Representatives for the 143rd district from 1998 to 2005.

== Election history ==
On July 28, 1998, the incumbent representative for the 143rd district of the Texas House of Representatives, Gerard Torres, resigned from office. A special election was called by then-governor George W. Bush to fill the unexpired term. The special election was ordered to occur on November 3, 1998.

On November 3, 1998, Moreno ran for the special election to the Texas House of Representatives. He successfully defeated K.E. Glucksmann in the special election, winning 73.12% of the vote. He assumed office on November 9, 1998.

=== Death ===
On May 6, 2005, Moreno was involved in a fatal car crash, which resulted in his death. He was buried at the Texas State Cemetery four days later. On May 24, 2005, then-governor Rick Perry called a special election to fill his unexpired term, and the special election was ordered to subsequently occur on November 8, 2005. Moreno was succeeded by Ana Hernandez on December 20, 2005, who won 61.16% of the vote.

Texas House of Representatives
Preceded by Gerard Torres	Texas State Representative for District 143 (Harris County); 1998 - 2005	Succeeded by Ana Hernandez
