= Charles McClelland =

American police chief

- Born: Center, Texas
- Police career
- Department: Houston Police Department
- Service years: 1977 - 2016
- Rank: Sworn in as a Police Trainee - 1976; Patrol Officer - 1977; Assistant Chief of Police - 1998; Executive Assistant Chief of Police; Police Chief - 2010
- Badge no.: Chief

Charles A. McClelland Jr. was the police chief of the Houston Police Department (HPD) from 2010 through 2016. Joining the department in May 1977, McClelland worked his way up through the ranks, from rookie to assistant chief in 1998, before being asked to step in as acting chief. A graduate of the University of Houston–Downtown, University of Houston–Clear Lake, and the FBI National Academy, he oversaw the department's implementation of tasers and a real-time crime analysis program.

== Education ==
McClelland holds a bachelor's degree in criminology from the University of Houston–Downtown and a master's degree in sociology from the University of Houston–Clear Lake, and a graduate from the FBI National Academy.

== Career ==
McClelland became a patrol officer in May 1977, and worked his way up through assignments with sex crimes units and the homicide division.

When racial tensions at the city's Northeast Patrol Division boiled over in 1992, McClelland and Capt. Mike Thaler were brought in to remedy discrimination complaints by black patrolmen. As an assistant chief, he has been at the center of some of HPD's most controversial incidents of recent years, one being the approval of the August 2002 raid on a Kmart parking lot where nearly 300 bystanders were arrested during a crackdown on street racing. McClelland later testified he never saw a subsequent memo authorizing the arrests of spectators as well as racers. He also oversaw the department's implementation of tasers and a real-time crime analysis program, which allows for improved overall crime tracking and analysis 24 hours a day, 365 days a year. Known as a meticulous investigator, McClelland was brought into one patrol division to quell racial tensions.

Before becoming acting police chief (after the resignation of Chief Harold Hurtt prior to Mayor Bill White leaving office in late 2009 after 3 two year terms under the City of Houston term limit ordinance), McClelland oversaw HPD's investigative operations as an executive assistant chief, which include 1,500 officers, 12 divisions and a $117 million budget. Mayor Annise Parker confirmed him as chief in early 2010 until his 2016 retirement when Parker's successor (Sylvester Turner) became mayor).
