= Greg Travis (politician) =

Houston politician

Member of Houston City Council for District G
- In office January 2, 2016 – February 2, 2022
- Preceded by: Oliver Pennington
- Succeeded by: Mary Nan Huffman

Personal details
- Born: Gregory R. Travis; June 7, 1963 (age 63)
- Party: Republican
- Domestic partner: Julie Cumley
- Education: Westminster College (BA); University of Texas, Austin (JD)
- Occupation: Attorney

Military service
- Allegiance: United States
- Branch/service: United States Air Force
- Rank: Officer

Gregory R. Travis (born June 7, 1963) is a Houston politician and attorney who represented District G of the Houston City Council from 2016 to 2022.

== Personal life ==
Gregory R. Travis was born on June 7, 1963. He attended Westminster College and received a bachelor's degree in business and philosophy. Additionally, he has his JD from University of Texas School of Law. He also served as an officer in the United States Air Force. Travis owns The Travis Law Firm, P.C., which is a law firm, where he works as an attorney. He also teaches business law at Houston Community College. He has done volunteer and charity work for Chain Reaction Ministries; has been a mentor and coach for Depelchin Children's Center; and supports animal rescue groups. He is engaged to Julie Cumley, and is a member of St. Luke's United Methodist Church.

== Political career ==
In 2002, Travis was a candidate for District 28 of the Texas House of Representatives.

=== Houston City Council ===
Travis assumed office to represent District G of the Houston City Council on January 2, 2016, succeeding Oliver Pennington. District G is the wealthiest district in Houston and is considered to be one of the wealthiest areas in the United States. Travis is currently serving his second term.

In December 2020, Travis faced criticism for posting an internet meme on his personal Facebook account depicting Michelle Obama and Melania Trump. The meme portrayed Melania Trump in a positive manner while portraying Michelle Obama negatively. Houston Black Lives Matter, among others, called for his resignation.

In October 2021, Travis announced he would be running for a seat in the Texas House of Representatives, which was effectively an announcement of resignation from the Houston City Council because the Texas Constitution forbids council members from campaigning for another office. He left office on February 2, 2022, and was succeeded by Mary Nan Huffman.

=== Policies ===
Travis is affiliated with the Republican Party.

Travis believes that city government should be fiscally responsible and a "sturdy but quiet force." He was an opponent of the Houston HERO ordinance, which was intended to be an anti-discrimination ordinance for LGBTQ Houstonians. He gained his support from the Houston Police Officers' Union by budgeting money to fund bulletproof vests for the Houston Police. He has cited issues in District G drainage, roadways, and a lack of police presence in the community. Travis supports improvements to infrastructure for bicycling in Houston. In March 2020, Travis criticized Mayor Sylvester Turner's decision to cancel the Houston Livestock Show and Rodeo due to the COVID-19 pandemic.
