= Afro-American Patrolmen's League =

The Afro-American Patrolmen's League, now known as the African American Police League, was established in 1968 after Chicago police officer Edward "Buzz" Palmer witnessed the effects of Chicago Mayor Richard Daley's "shoot to kill" order brought on by Martin Luther King Jr.'s assassination and the increase of black uprisings that followed his death. Safety of black leaders and citizens from white reactionaries quickly became a pressing issue. Palmer put together a small group of people, consisting of Renault Robinson, Curtis Cowsen, Willie Ware, Jack Debonnett, Tom Mitchell, and himself, to become the Afro-American Patrolmen's League; the group, with the exception of Mitchell, was made up of police officers and was committed to defending and protecting the people in their local black communities.

== Purpose ==
One major goal of the AAPL was to improve the relationship between black communities and law enforcement personnel. To accomplish this, the organization decided to work on three key points: to work hand-in-hand with the community to resolve issues, to take steps to change the poor image they portray to the community, and to create a symbiotic relationship between law enforcement and the community. Another significant goal of the AAPL was to work to protect black offenders from receiving unjust punishment and conduct by police. According to an article in the Chicago Defender, "[t]hey hope to teach their white counterparts that respect for the black community is essential in enforcing the law, and they hope to teach the black policemen that as a symbol of authority he has a greater responsibility to his brother". Thirdly, it was a goal of the organization to increase the number of African Americans in law enforcement. The League sought support by creating and advertising the slogan "We support the black community" and by reaching out to more powerful organizations, like the Garfield Organization led by Frederick Douglass “Doug” Andrews. The League also received grants from the Ford Foundation that allowed the members to pay for organization development training classes. This newfound organization was highly respected by many.

== Reception ==
Though many supported the Afro-American Patrolmen's League, it sometimes caused great controversy due to the cases in which it was involved, which led to the League receiving criticism and harassment from certain citizens and other law enforcement officials. For example, after defending Reverend Jesse Jackson in a lawsuit, Mayor Daley threatened to remove the League members from their jobs, specifically Officer Palmer. Many officers experienced abuse from their colleagues; Renault "Reggie" Robinson, co-founder of the AAPL, claimed that "between 1967 and 1973 he was unjustifiably suspended more than 100 times. He also alleged that his superiors intentionally gave him subpar assignments in order to ridicule him". Still, the organization was supported by many, like Augustus Savage, president of the Organization for the Southwest Communities, who claimed that "League members deserve praise rather than punishment, for they have done far more than any of the other policemen's associations to satisfy the need of the black community for just a little more respect for and from the police department".

Despite the flack the AAPL received, it continued to fight against anything that was damaging to its beliefs and goals, such as the "stop and frisk" law, which allowed police officers to stop and frisk anyone on the street whom they believed to be suspicious. Instead, the League argued that police officers should be consulted before any legislation that affects the relationship between the community and law enforcement officials is made. The "stop and frisk" law was a prime example of that, as it would cause tension between the citizens and the policemen who chose to enact that particular law either unjustly or excessively, which would lead the black community to have resentment and contempt for all police officers in general.

== Legal activism ==
The AAPL took the necessary measures in order to ensure its goals were met. Representatives from the organization were present in numerous cases involving discrimination or unruly treatment, including their own case against the Chicago Police Department. The League "filed a discrimination suit against the Chicago Police Department challenging the department on hiring, promotion, assignment, and discipline".

The court sided with the AAPL and they won the case. Before the founding of the organization, only fifteen percent of Chicago's law enforcement officials were African American; after the group won the case against the department, that number increased to forty percent. This fulfilled one of AAPL's main goals and was physical proof that the organization was making a difference. Eventually, the case went to the Supreme Court, where the ruling was also in favor of the League. Many subsequent cases similar to this found the case and its results influential, which improved racial integration in police forces across the nation. Through their success in the trial, the League proved that it had accomplished and would continue to accomplish their goal of defending and protecting the black community against maltreatment.

== Education ==
Another way the AAPL took action was through holding classes, which they termed "sensitivity workshops." In these workshops, citizens of the community, black officers, and white officers could gather and learn how to build respect for each other and how to communicate more effectively with one another. This was a step to completing another one of their major goals – to improve the relationship between those three entities. The Afro-American Patrolmen's League is still known today as "one of the pioneers of racial reform in the city [Chicago]".
