= Chris Hollins (politician) =

Lawyer and Political Organizer

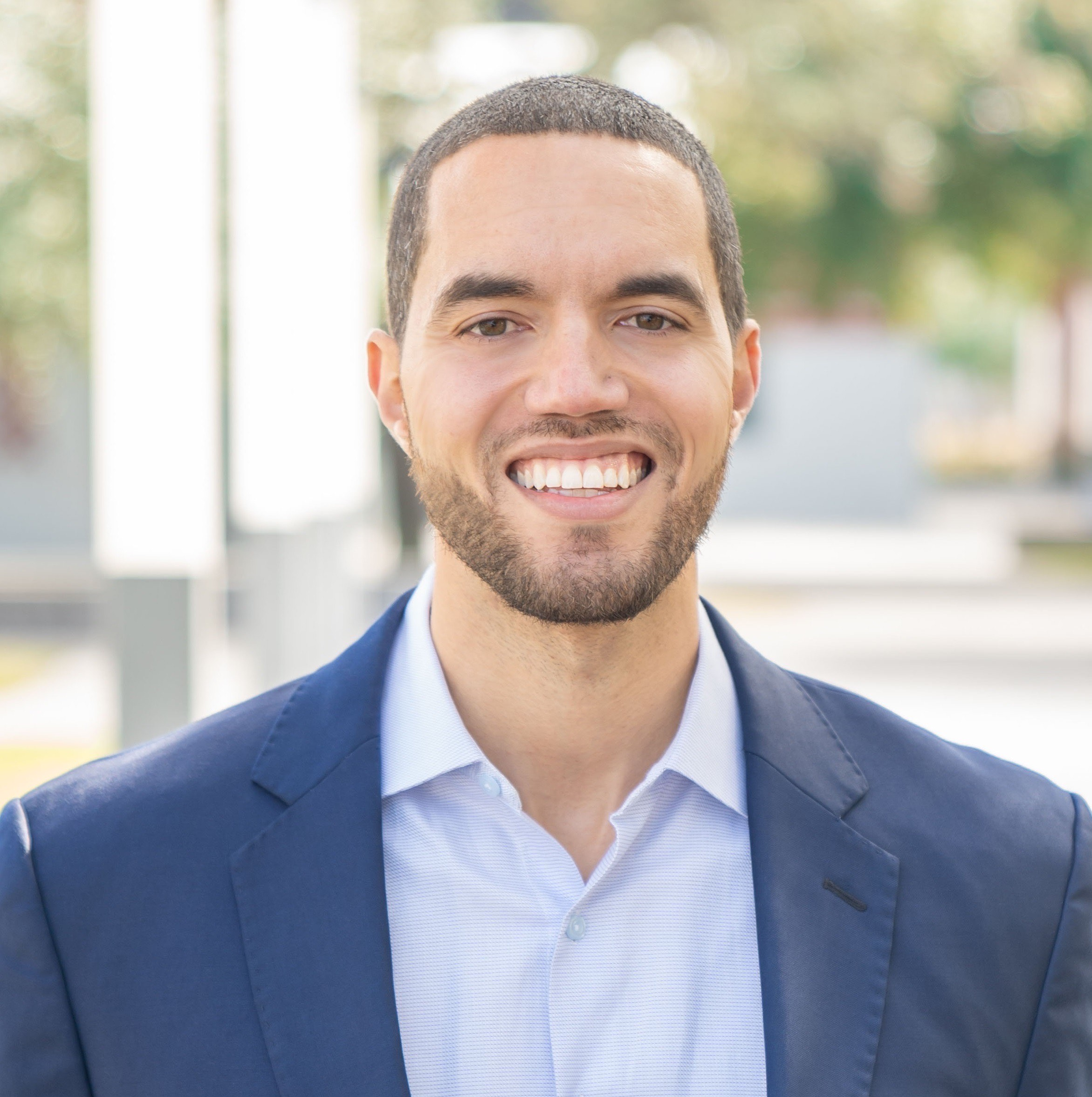

City Controller of Houston
- Incumbent
- Assumed office January 2024
- Preceded by: Chris Brown

County Clerk of Harris County
- Acting
- In office June 1, 2020 – November 17, 2020
- Preceded by: Diane Trautman
- Succeeded by: Teneshia Hudspeth

Personal details
- Born: Christopher George Hollins; July 8, 1986 (age 40)
- Party: Democratic
- Education: Morehouse College (BA); Yale University (JD); Harvard University (MBA)

Christopher George Hollins (born July 8, 1986) is an American attorney and Democratic politician serving as the City Controller of Houston since January 2024. He previously served as interim county clerk of Harris County from June 2020 to November 2020, where he oversaw the administration of the 2020 United States presidential election in the county and implemented expanded voting-access measures, including drive-through and 24-hour voting, that prompted legal challenges and political opposition from Republican state officials. In February 2022, Hollins announced his candidacy in the 2023 Houston mayoral election to succeed Sylvester Turner, but in April 2023 he withdrew from the race and instead ran for city controller. He was elected to succeed Chris Brown as city controller in a December 9, 2023 runoff election.

== Early life and career ==
Christopher George Hollins was born on July 8, 1986 (Note: On July 8, 2021, Mayor Sylvester Turner wished Hollins a "Happy Birthday" on Twitter, to which Hollins responded in gratitude. The Houston Chronicle reported Hollins to be age 35 on February 7, 2022, a detail that places his birth year in 1986.) and is a fourth-generation Houstonian. His father served for 34 years in the Houston Police Department, and his mother raised more than 25 foster children in addition to Hollins and his two sisters. He grew up in Missouri City, Texas, and graduated from Hightower High School.

Hollins earned a Bachelor of Arts degree in political science from Morehouse College, followed by a Juris Doctor from Yale Law School and a Master of Business Administration from Harvard Business School. Before beginning his political career, he worked as a management consultant for McKinsey & Company.

Hollins is licensed to practice law in Texas, and has been involved in civic and political organizing throughout his career.

== Political career ==
=== Interim Clerk for Harris County ===
On May 16, 2020, the Commissioners Court for Harris County voted to appoint Hollins as Interim Clerk for Harris County, Texas by a 3–2, party-line vote after his predecessor, Diane Trautman, resigned from the position citing ill health. At 33 years old, Hollins was the youngest person to have ever held the position, as well as the first African American. He took office on June 1, 2020.

The Office of the Harris County Clerk is not only responsible for administering permits and other licenses or incorporation documents, but also responsible for managing all election responsibilities as the Harris County Elections Administrator. Hollins submitted a plan to separate the responsibilities of overseeing the election from the Office of the Harris County Clerk into a new, separate appointed position: Harris County Elections Administrator. His efforts resulted in Isabel Longoria, a community organizer and special adviser to Hollins, being sworn in to the office via virtual ceremony on November 18, 2020. Longoria was the first to hold the position.

Hollins tenure as clerk ended on November 17, 2020, and he was succeeded by newly elected Teneshia Hudspeth. Both during and following his tenure as Clerk, Hollins made both national and local news appearances, including but not limited to KTRK-TV (ABC); Ayman; and Zerlina.

Following his June 2020 appointment, Hollins proposed the expansion of in-person voting, and the introduction of mail-in ballots, and drive-thru voting to improve voter access and turnout during the COVID-19 pandemic. Local Republican party officials and state leaders voted against the reforms and filed lawsuits to halt them.

Texas Governor Greg Abbott cited election integrity as his reason for denying expanded voter access, issuing a proclamation to shut down multiple locations for dropping off absentee ballots. Soon after, the Governor limited drop-off sites to one location per county. The Supreme Court of Texas issued a temporary stay to block Hollins from mailing out ballot applications while it heard the merits of the case.

In late 2020, the Texas Supreme Court rejected a request to discard more than 127,000 ballots cast at drive-thru sites. However, the Texas Supreme Court ruled against Hollins’ measures to mail all registered voters a mail ballot application and upheld the Governor's order that counties only have one drop-off site for mail-in ballots.,

Ultimately, Harris County recorded roughly 1.4 million early votes in the 2020 presidential election — the highest number in its history. This was the first year that drive-thru voting and 24-hour voting sites were options for voters in a presidential election in the county.

=== 2020 U.S. presidential election and Texas voting restrictions ===
Hollins was vocal in opposing Texas governor Greg Abbott's decision to allow only one drop-box per Texas county in the 2020 presidential election.

Hollins sought to send out applications for postal (mail-in) ballots for the general election to each registered voter to Harris County. However, this plan was challenged by Republican officials, and was blocked by the Supreme Court of Texas in October 2020. Other policies instituted by Hollins include expansion of in-person voting locations, the introduction of drive-through voting, developing COVID-19 safety guidelines regarding voting, extending voting hours to include 24-hour voting.

On November 1, 2020, days before election day, the Supreme Court of Texas threw out a Republican challenge seeking to invalidate about 127,000 votes cast via the drive-through voting program Hollins implemented. Two days later, a federal judge upheld the legitimacy of drive-through votes, rejecting a similar Republican effort to invalidate votes cast through this method.

On September 7, 2021, Governor Abbott responded to the voting modifications Hollins put in place during his tenure as Clerk by signing a voting bill that tightened state election laws by limiting the ability to expand voting options at the county level. The voting bill was scheduled to take effect just in time for the 2022 primary elections, but has since been stuck in federal court.

In November 2020, Hollins appeared on various national and local news programs to discuss the Harris County elections, including MSNBC.

=== Houston mayoral and city controller runs ===
In February 2022, Hollins announced his candidacy in the 2023 Houston mayoral election to succeed Sylvester Turner, who was term-limited. In the first five months of his candidacy, Hollins raised $1.1 million. On April 6, 2023, Hollins withdrew from the mayoral race to instead run for city controller. He indicated that the entrance of Sheila Jackson Lee to the race influenced his decision to drop out. Hollins did not make an endorsement for any of the remaining candidates, but expressed admiration for Jackson Lee.

In the city controller race, Hollins ran running against Orlando Sanchez, Dave Martin, and Shannon Nobles. Houston Public Media identified Hollins and Sanchez as the primary contenders. In the first round, Hollins obtained 45% of the vote and Sanchez earned 27%. With both being shy of the 50% plus one threshold, they advanced to a runoff. On December 8, Hollins won the runoff against Sanchez.

=== Houston City Controller ===
Hollins was elected City Controller on December 3, 2023.

In spring of 2025, Hollins introduced a comprehensive audit plan to address the city's $330 million budget deficit. The plan addressed 37 audit projects including compliance, and contract audits to identify cost savings, inefficiencies and waste.

He also withheld certification of a proposed $1.5 billion settlement with the Houston firefighters' union until key fiscal questions were addressed.

In May 2025, Hollins announced he would not certify the mayor's proposed $7 billion 2026 budget. He stated that certification would not move forward without a trial court-approved settlement with the plaintiffs of a longstanding lawsuit stating the city was shortchanging a voter-mandated fund for street and drainage projects. Hollins warned that the budget as proposed would require property taxes to be raised and services to be reduced if the lawsuit was not finalized before budget certification.

== Other political activities ==
In 2009, Hollins was a summer intern during the presidency of Barack Obama. As a White House intern, Hollins worked in the Office of Presidential Personnel which oversees the selection process for presidential appointments.

After his tenure as County Clerk, Hollins was appointed to sit on the Board of Directors of the Metropolitan Transit Authority of Harris County.

Hollins is the former Vice Chair of the Texas Democratic Party.

== Personal life ==
Hollins lives in Houston's Third Ward neighborhood with his wife, Morgan, and their son and daughter. The Hollins family attends Wheeler Avenue Baptist Church, and he serves on the advisory board of Interfaith Ministries for Greater Houston.
