= Corey Anderson (cricketer) =

American cricketer

Personal information
- Full name: Corey James Anderson
- Born: December 13, 1990 (age 35); Christchurch, New Zealand
- Batting: Left-handed
- Bowling: Left-arm medium-fast
- Role: All-rounder

International information
- National sides: New Zealand (2012–2018); United States (2024)
- Test debut (cap 261): October 9, 2013; New Zealand v Bangladesh
- Last Test: February 20, 2016; New Zealand v Australia
- ODI debut (cap 181): June 16, 2013; New Zealand v England
- Last ODI: June 9, 2017; New Zealand v Bangladesh
- T20I debut (cap 56/35): December 21, 2012; New Zealand v South Africa
- Last T20I: June 12, 2024; United States v India

Domestic team information
- Years: Team
- 2006/07–2010/11: Canterbury
- 2011/12–2018/19: Northern Districts
- 2014–2015: Mumbai Indians
- 2017: Delhi Daredevils
- 2017–2018: Somerset
- 2018: Royal Challengers Bangalore
- 2019: Lahore Qalandars
- 2019/20: Auckland
- 2020: Barbados Tridents
- 2023/24: Hobart Hurricanes
- 2024/25: Victoria

Career statistics
Competition	Test	ODI	T20I	FC
Matches	13	49	42	53
Runs scored	683	1,109	697	2,862
Batting average	32.52	27.72	24.89	36.22
100s/50s	1/4	1/4	0/3	4/13
Top score	116	131*	94*	167
Balls bowled	1302	1,485	432	3,153
Wickets	16	60	16	40
Bowling average	41.18	25.03	36.56	41.87
5 wickets in innings	0	1	0	1
10 wickets in match	0	0	0	0
Best bowling	3/47	5/63	2/17	5/22
Catches/stumpings	7/–	11/–	21/–	39/–
Medal record
Men's Cricket
Representing New Zealand
ICC Cricket World Cup
Runner-up	2015 Australia and New Zealand
- Source: ESPNcricinfo, August 18, 2024

Corey James Anderson (born December 13, 1990) is a New Zealand–born cricketer who played as an all-rounder for both the New Zealand and United States international teams. After retiring from the New Zealand team in 2020, he announced his intention to play for the United States in 2022. He was a part of the New Zealand squad to finish as runners-up at the 2015 Cricket World Cup.

On January 1, 2014, Anderson scored the then fastest century in the history of One Day International cricket. Playing against West Indies, he reached his hundred in just 36 balls, breaking Shahid Afridi's previous record of 37 deliveries. Anderson finished the innings unbeaten on 131 in 47 balls, hitting 14 sixes and 6 fours. This record was later broken in 2015 by AB de Villiers, who scored a century against the West Indies off 31 deliveries.

== Domestic career ==
Anderson came into the Canterbury Wizards Squad in the 2006/07 season, freshly promoted from his performances for the New Zealand under-19 cricket team. He also played for his high school 1st XI team at Christchurch Boys' High School including playing in the team which won three consecutive Gillette Cups from 2005 to 2007.

Anderson was also jointly named player of the Gillette cup in 2006 when he shared this honor with current Blackcap Tim Southee.

In 2007, Anderson received a playing contract from New Zealand Cricket, making him the youngest player in New Zealand first-class cricket history to gain a contract.

Anderson had yet to show his full potential at first-class level and after several injuries interrupted seasons with shoulder and groin injuries, Corey Anderson transferred to Northern Districts at the start of the 2011/12 season to restart his promising career.

== International career ==
=== New Zealand ===
==== ODI career ====
Anderson made his debut for New Zealand in a T20 international against South Africa on 21 December 2012 after being named in the T20I and ODI squad for the 2012–13 tour of South Africa. He was included in New Zealand's ODI squad for the Champions Trophy in 2013 and made his ODI debut against England in Cardiff on June 16, 2013.

On January 1, 2014, at the Queenstown Events Centre Anderson broke Shahid Afridi's 17-year-old record of the fastest ODI hundred by one ball, scoring his in 36 balls. He eventually ended with an unbeaten 131 that featured 14 sixes and 6 fours. Along with Jesse Ryder, he helped New Zealand set the team record for the most sixes in an ODI innings. On January 18, 2015, his record was broken by AB de Villiers scoring a hundred in 31 balls vs West Indies.

==== Test career ====
Anderson made his Test debut against Bangladesh on July 9, 2013 and scored 1 & 8 with the bat. He obtained two wickets from 19 overs with the ball. Anderson hit his maiden Test century in his second Test match. He scored 116 runs from 173 balls and took one wicket.

In May 2018, Anderson was one of twenty players to be awarded a new contract for the 2018–19 season by New Zealand Cricket. However, in October 2018, he announced he was putting long-form cricket on hold to concentrate on the limited over formats. He quit New Zealand Cricket in December 2020.

=== United States ===
In 2023, Anderson became eligible to represent the United States in international cricket. In March 2024, he was named in the American team for their home series against Canada. He made his debut on April 12, in the 4th T20I, scoring 28 runs off 29 deliveries. Anderson scored his first half century in T20Is for the United States in the last match of the series, scoring 55 off 48 balls. In May 2024, Anderson was selected in the USA's Squad for ICC Men's T20 World Cup.

== T20 career ==
=== Indian Premier League ===
Anderson played in the IPL 7 for the Mumbai Indians who paid him 45 million rupees (US$750,000). In his debut match against Kolkata Knight Riders, he scored only 2 runs before being bowled by Sunil Narine. He bowled 3 overs and conceded 33 runs for no wickets.

Anderson obtained his first Man of the Match award against Kings XI Punjab on May 3, 2014, where he picked up the wicket of Cheteshwar Pujara and scored 35 runs from 25 balls.

On May 25, 2014, against the Rajasthan Royals, Anderson led his team, the Mumbai Indians through to the play-offs by scoring an unbeaten 95 off just 44 balls with Mumbai chasing a total of 190 in only 14.3 overs in order to qualify for the playoffs with a better net run rate.

In IPL 8, Anderson made valuable contributions with his bat in the earlier games, scoring two half-centuries in four games, but was ruled out following a finger injury.

In February 2017, he was bought by the Delhi Daredevils team for the 2017 Indian Premier League for 1 crore. He would replace fast bowler Nathan Coulter-Nile in the Royal Challengers Bangalore squad for the 2018 IPL season, the IPL Technical Committee confirmed on March 24. Coulter-Nile, who played a key role in Kolkata Knight Riders' season last year with 15 wickets from eight games, was ruled out owing to an injury and was prescribed 'ample rest'.

=== Other leagues ===
Anderson was scheduled to play for Sylhet Sixer XI in Bangladesh's topmost franchise T20 league, the Bangladesh Premier League. However, the following month, the tournament was canceled due to COVID-19 pandemic.

In 2019, Anderson was signed by Lahore Qalandars to play in PSL 4.

In December 2020, Anderson signed a three-year contract with the US-based Major League Cricket T20 competition. In June 2021, he was selected in the players' draft ahead of the Minor League Cricket tournament.

== Personal life ==
Anderson's wife, Mary Margaret, is from Dallas, Texas. He moved from Auckland to Dallas in 2020.
