= Annie's List =

Political action committee

Annie's List is a Texas-based political action committee dedicated to recruiting, training, and supporting progressive women running for state and county office. Since its founding in 2003, Annie's List has helped more than 130 progressive Texas women win races and raised more than $15 million to support endorsed candidates’ campaigns. Annie's List endorses candidates for State Legislature, County positions, and State Board of Education.

In the 2018 midterm elections, Annie's List had an 84% win rate and 31 of the 37 candidates Annie's List endorsed in 2018 won their election. Of the more than 80 Democratic women who ran for the legislature in the 2018 Texas primaries, the organization trained or supported more than 60% of them.

Royce Brooks has served as executive director since June 2018.
