= Hubert Vo =

American politician

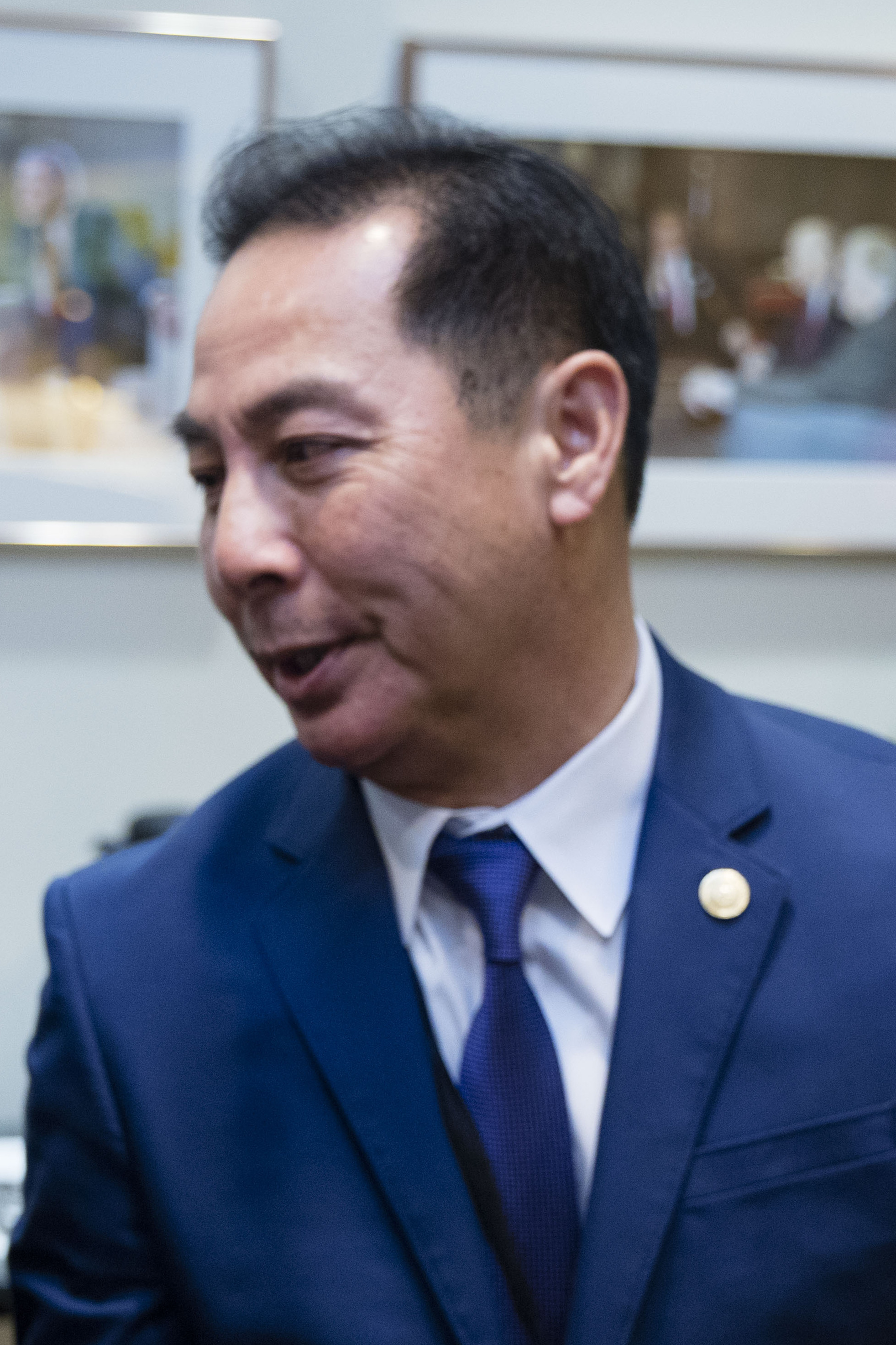
- Vo in 2016

Member of the Texas House of Representatives from the 149th district
- Incumbent
- Assumed office January 11, 2005
- Preceded by: Talmadge L. Heflin

Personal details
- Born: May 30, 1956 (age 70) South Vietnam
- Party: Democratic
- Education: University of Houston (BS)

Hubert Vo (Vietnamese: Hubert Võ, born May 30, 1956) is an American politician who is a Democratic member of the Texas House of Representatives for House District 149. He is the first and (to date) only Vietnamese American to be elected to the Texas legislature.

== Personal life ==
Vo was born in South Vietnam and attended French language schools before fleeing with his family for the United States in 1975, when he was 19 years old. The family settled in Lubbock before moving to Houston.

Vo is a 1983 graduate of the University of Houston with a Bachelor of Science in Mechanical Engineering degree. He is married and has three children.

== Political career ==
Vo currently serves as a Democratic member of the Texas House of Representatives, representing the 149th District which contains part of Harris County including part of west Houston and the suburbs of Alief and Katy. Vo was elected in 2004, defeating the incumbent Republican, Talmadge Heflin by the razor-thin margin of 20,695 to 20,662.

Talmadge Heflin was the Republican nominee again in 2006, seeking a rematch with Hubert Vo in the election of Tuesday, November 7, 2006. Vo won re-election with 54% of the vote.

The Houston Chronicle has reported numerous stories about apartment complexes owned by Vo. The complexes have been cited by the City of Houston for various building code violations.

In the 2008 Presidential election primaries Vo initially endorsed Senator Hillary Clinton, but later spoke for Texas Asian Americans & Pacific Islanders for Obama.

He won re-election in the 2010 election.

In 2014, Hubert Vo endorsed a program that would allow food stamps to be used at restaurants such as Taste of Texas and Luby's.

In 2016, Vo won re-nomination in the Democratic primary against challenger Demetria Smith, 4,442 votes (64.9%) to 2,406 (35.1%).

In its 2021 list of the best and worst legislators, Texas Monthly included Vo among four legislators dubbed "The Furniture" with little legislative effectiveness who "are scarcely distinguishable from their desks, chairs, and spittoons."

== Legislative committees ==
Vo has been a member of the following committees:

- Economic and Small Business Development, vice chair
- House Administration
- Insurance
- Public Safety

Texas House of Representatives
Preceded by Talmadge L. Heflin	Member of the Texas House of Representatives from District 149 (Houston); 2005 – present	Incumbent
