= Texas's 149th House of Representatives district =

American legislative district

Texas's 149th State House of Representatives district
Representative
Hubert Vo; D–Houston
- Demographics: 13.2% White; 27.1% Black; 40.8% Hispanic; 19.2% Asian
- Population (2020) • Voting age: 198,740; 149,180

The 149th district of the Texas House of Representatives contains parts of Houston. The current representative is Hubert Vo, who has represented the district since 2005.
