= 2024 United States House of Representatives elections in Texas =

- November 5, 2024

All 38 Texas seats to the United States House of Representatives
	Majority party	Minority party
Party	Republican	Democratic
Last election	25	13
Seats won	25	13
Seat change	Steady	Steady
Popular vote	6,235,017	4,311,123
Percentage	58.41%	40.39%
Swing	▼0.37%	▲1.66%

Republican
50–60%
60–70%
70–80%
80–90%
>90%
Democratic
50–60%
60–70%
70–80%
80–90%
>90%

The 2024 United States House of Representatives elections in Texas were held on November 5, 2024, to elect the thirty-eight U.S. representatives from the State of Texas, one from each of the state's congressional districts. The elections coincided with the 2024 U.S. presidential election, other elections to the House of Representatives, elections to the United States Senate, and various state and local elections. The primary elections took place on March 5, 2024.

== Overview ==
=== District-by-district summary ===
Results of the 2024 United States House of Representatives elections in Texas by district:

District	Republican		Democratic		Others		Total		Result
District	Votes	%	Votes	%	Votes	%	Votes	%	Result
District 1	258,523	100.00%	0	0.00%	0	0.00%	258,523	100.00%	Republican hold
District 2	214,631	65.66%	112,252	34.34%	0	0.00%	326,883	100.00%	Republican hold
District 3	237,794	62.45%	142,953	37.54%	0	0.00%	380,747	100.00%	Republican hold
District 4	241,603	68.38%	111,696	31.61%	0	0.00%	353,299	100.00%	Republican hold
District 5	192,185	64.08%	107,712	35.91%	0	0.00%	299,897	100.00%	Republican hold
District 6	188,119	65.68%	98,319	34.32%	0	0.00%	286,438	100.00%	Republican hold
District 7	94,651	38.71%	149,820	61.17%	0	0.00%	244,471	100.00%	Democratic hold
District 8	233,423	68.21%	108,754	31.78%	0	0.00%	342,177	100.00%	Republican hold
District 9	0	0.00%	184,141	100.00%	0	0.00%	184,141	100.00%	Democratic hold
District 10	221,229	63.60%	118,280	34.01%	8,309	2.39%	347,818	100.00%	Republican hold
District 11	211,975	100.00%	0	0.00%	0	0.00%	211,975	100.00%	Republican hold
District 12	215,564	63.45%	124,154	36.55%	0	0.00%	339,718	100.00%	Republican hold
District 13	240,622	100.00%	0	0.00%	0	0.00%	240,622	100.00%	Republican hold
District 14	210,320	68.68%	95,875	31.31%	0	0.00%	306,195	100.00%	Republican hold
District 15	127,804	57.03%	95,965	42.88%	0	0.00%	223,769	100.00%	Republican hold
District 16	89,281	40.46%	131,391	59.54%	0	0.00%	220,672	100.00%	Democratic hold
District 17	193,101	66.35%	97,941	33.65%	0	0.00%	291,042	100.00%	Republican hold
District 18	66,810	30.55%	151,834	69.42%	76	0.03%	218,720	100.00%	Democratic hold
District 19	214,600	80.69%	51,275	19.31%	0	0.00%	265,875	100.00%	Republican hold
District 20	0	0.00%	157,890	100.00%	0	0.00%	218,720	100.00%	Democratic hold
District 21	263,744	61.85%	153,765	36.06%	8,914	2.09%	426,423	100.00%	Republican hold
District 22	209,285	62.12%	127,604	37.88%	0	0.00%	336,889	100.00%	Republican hold
District 23	180,720	62.30%	109,373	37.70%	0	0.00%	290,093	100.00%	Republican hold
District 24	227,108	60.30%	149,518	39.70%	0	0.00%	290,093	100.00%	Republican hold
District 25	263,042	99.37%	0	0.00%	1,661	0.63%	264,703	100.00%	Republican hold
District 26	241,096	62.07%	138,558	35.67%	8,773	2.26%	388,427	100.00%	Republican hold
District 27	183,980	66.04%	94,596	33.96%	0	0.00%	278,576	100.00%	Republican hold
District 28	112,117	47.19%	125,490	52.81%	0	0.00%	237,607	100.00%	Democratic hold
District 29	52,830	34.71%	99,379	65.29%	0	0.00%	152,209	100.00%	Democratic hold
District 30	0	0.00%	197,650	84.89%	35,175	15.10%	232,825	100.00%	Democratic hold
District 31	228,520	64.43%	125,959	35.57%	0	0.00%	355,557	100.00%	Republican hold
District 32	85,941	36.97%	140,536	60.45%	5,987	2.58%	232,464	100.00%	Democratic hold
District 33	51,607	31.21%	113,461	68.79%	0	0.00%	166,153	100.00%	Democratic hold
District 34	97,470	48.71%	102,607	51.29%	0	0.00%	200,383	100.00%	Democratic hold
District 35	82,610	32.64%	170,509	67.36%	0	0.00%	253,119	100.00%	Democratic hold
District 36	205,539	69.36%	90,458	30.64%	0	0.00%	297,018	100.00%	Republican hold
District 37	80,366	23.58%	252,980	74.22%	0	0.00%	340,857	100.00%	Democratic hold
District 38	215,030	62.73%	127,640	37.24%	94	0.03%	342,764	100.00%	Republican hold
Total	6,235,017	58.41%	4,311,123	40.39%	62,908	0.59%	10,609,048	100.00%	

== District 1 ==
2024 Texas's 1st congressional district election
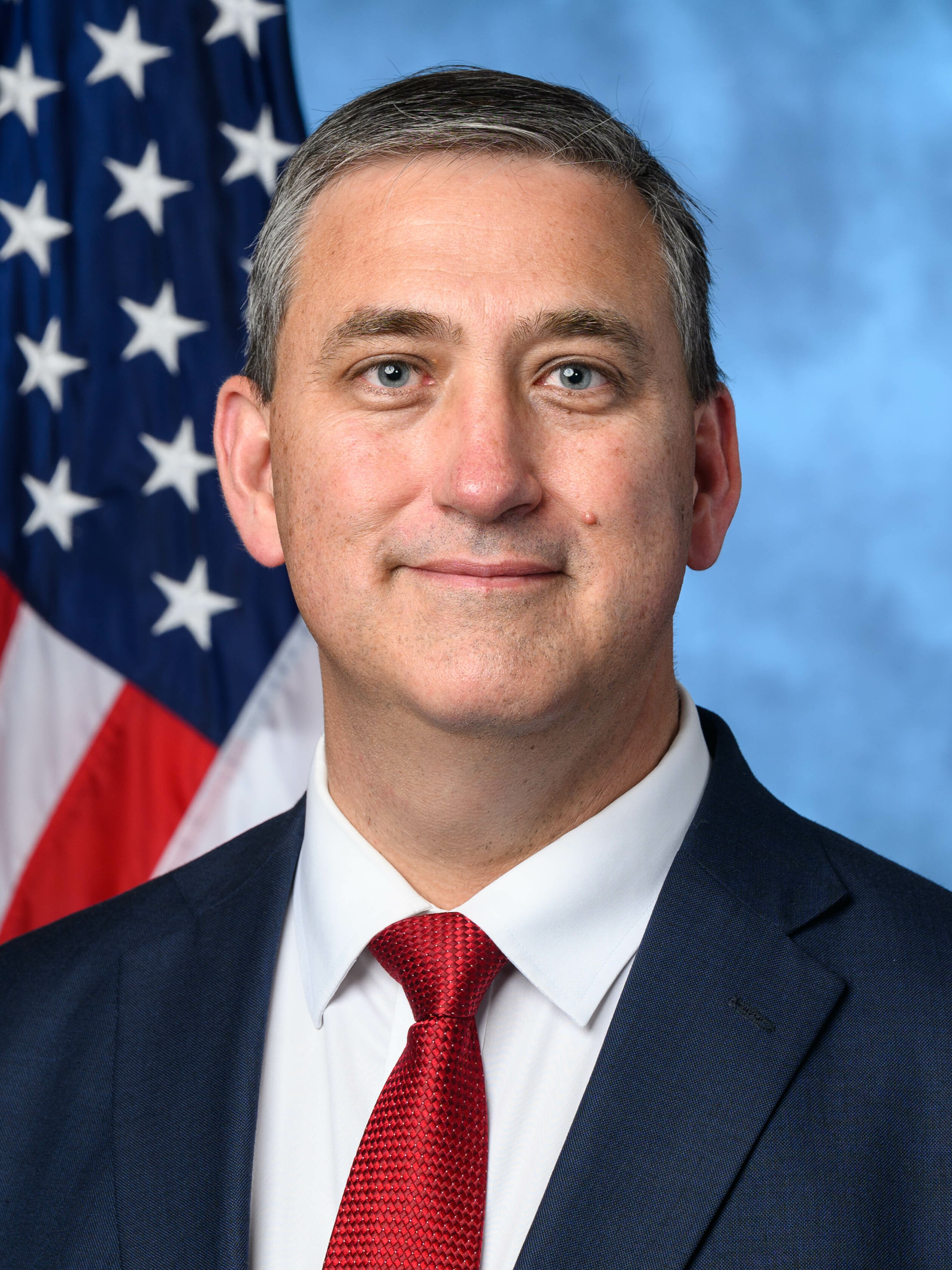
Nominee	Nathaniel Moran
Party	Republican
Popular vote	258,523
Percentage	100.0%
- County results Moran: ≥90%
U.S. Representative before election
Nathaniel Moran
Republican
Elected U.S. Representative
Nathaniel Moran
Republican

The 1st district encompasses Tyler, Longview, and Texarkana. The incumbent was Republican Nathaniel Moran, who was elected with 78.08% of the vote in 2022.

=== Republican primary ===
==== Nominee ====
- Nathaniel Moran, incumbent U.S. representative

==== Results ====
Republican primary results
Party	Candidate	Votes	%
Republican	Nathaniel Moran (incumbent)	84,442	100.0
Total votes		84,442	100.0

==== Endorsements ====
Nathaniel Moran

Local officials

- 16 county sheriffs

Organizations

- AIPAC
- National Rifle Association Political Victory Fund
- Pro-Israel America (post-primary)
- Texas Alliance for Life
- Texas Medical Association PAC

==== Fundraising ====
Campaign finance reports as of February 14, 2024
Candidate	Raised	Spent	Cash on hand
Nathaniel Moran (R)	$564,548	$410,535	$272,757
Source: Federal Election Commission

=== General election ===
==== Predictions ====
Source	Ranking	As of
The Cook Political Report	Solid R	February 2, 2023
Inside Elections	Solid R	November 13, 2023
Sabato's Crystal Ball	Safe R	February 23, 2023
Elections Daily	Safe R	September 7, 2023
CNalysis	Solid R	November 16, 2023
Decision Desk HQ	Safe R	June 14, 2024

==== Results ====
2024 Texas's 1st congressional district election
Party	Candidate	Votes	%
Republican	Nathaniel Moran (incumbent)	258,523	100.00%

==== By county ====
County	Nathaniel Moran Republican
County	Votes
Bowie	23,885
Camp	4,248
Cass	11,505
Franklin	4,355
Gregg	36,766
Harrison	24,343
Marion	3,757
Morris	4,109
Panola	9,520
Red River	3,229
Rusk	17,120
Sabine	4,927
San Augustine	2,969
Shelby	8,164
Smith	80,248
Titus	8,114
Upshur	11,264
Totals	258,523

== District 2 ==
2024 Texas's 2nd congressional district election
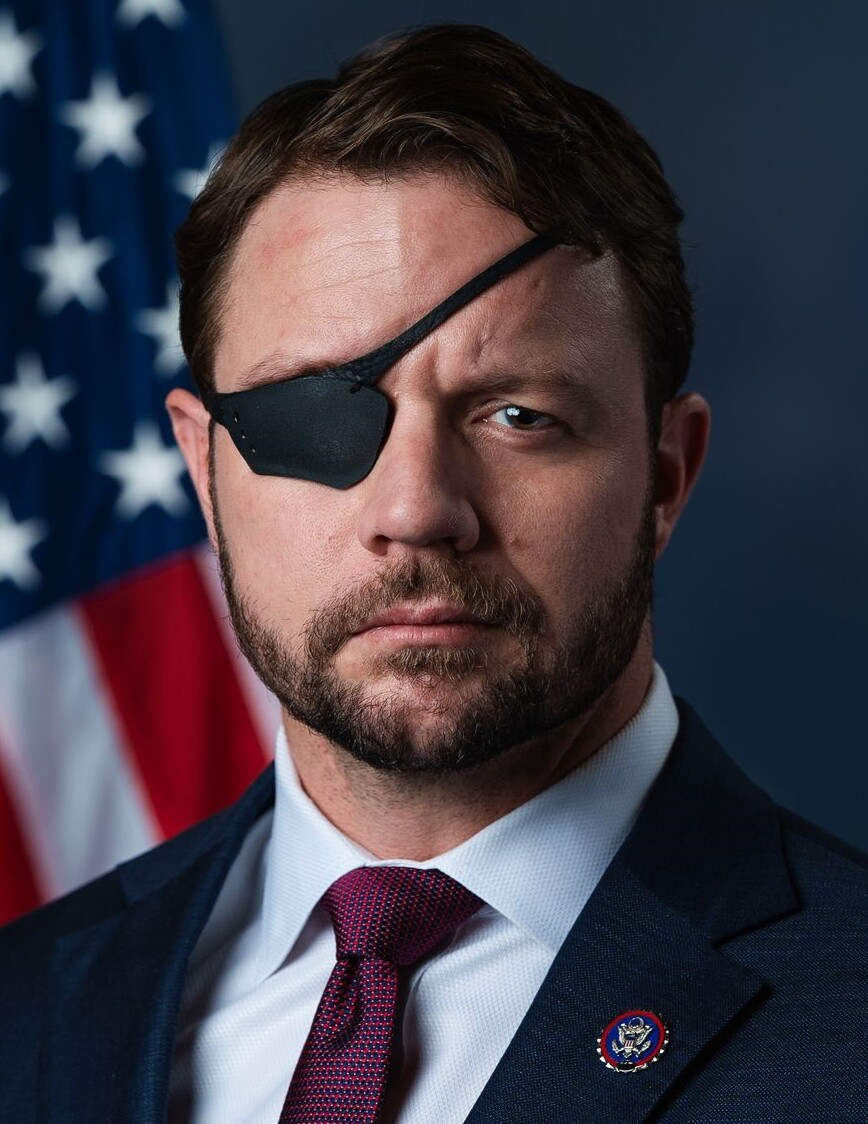

Nominee	Dan Crenshaw	Peter Filler
Party	Republican	Democratic
Popular vote	214,631	112,252
Percentage	65.7%	34.3%
- Crenshaw: 50–60% 60–70% 70–80% 80–90% >90% Filler: 50–60% 60–70% 70–80% No votes
U.S. Representative before election
Dan Crenshaw
Republican
Elected U.S. Representative
Dan Crenshaw
Republican

The 2nd district encompasses The Woodlands, Spring, Kingwood, Humble, and Atascocita. The incumbent was Republican Dan Crenshaw, who was re-elected with 65.91% of the vote in 2022.

=== Republican primary ===
==== Nominee ====
- Dan Crenshaw, incumbent U.S. representative

==== Eliminated in primary ====
- Jameson Ellis, marketing executive and candidate for this district in 2022

==== Endorsements ====
Dan Crenshaw

Organizations

- AIPAC
- Log Cabin Republicans PAC (post-primary)
- National Rifle Association Political Victory Fund
- Texas Alliance for Life
- Texas Medical Association PAC

Newspapers

- Houston Chronicle

==== Fundraising ====
Campaign finance reports as of February 14, 2024
Candidate	Raised	Spent	Cash on hand
Dan Crenshaw (R)	$2,343,169	$2,709,738	$770,875
Jameson Ellis (R)	$28,576	$23,383	$5,285
Source: Federal Election Commission

==== Results ====
Results of the Republican primary in the 2nd district by precinct 90–100% Crenshaw 70–80% Crenshaw 60–70% Crenshaw 50–60% Crenshaw 50–60% Ellis

Republican primary results
Party	Candidate	Votes	%
Republican	Dan Crenshaw (incumbent)	40,379	59.5
Republican	Jameson Ellis	27,482	40.5
Total votes		67,861	100.0

=== Democratic primary ===
==== Nominee ====
- Peter Filler, teacher

==== Results ====
Democratic primary results
Party	Candidate	Votes	%
Democratic	Peter Filler	17,044	100.0
Total votes		17,044	100.0

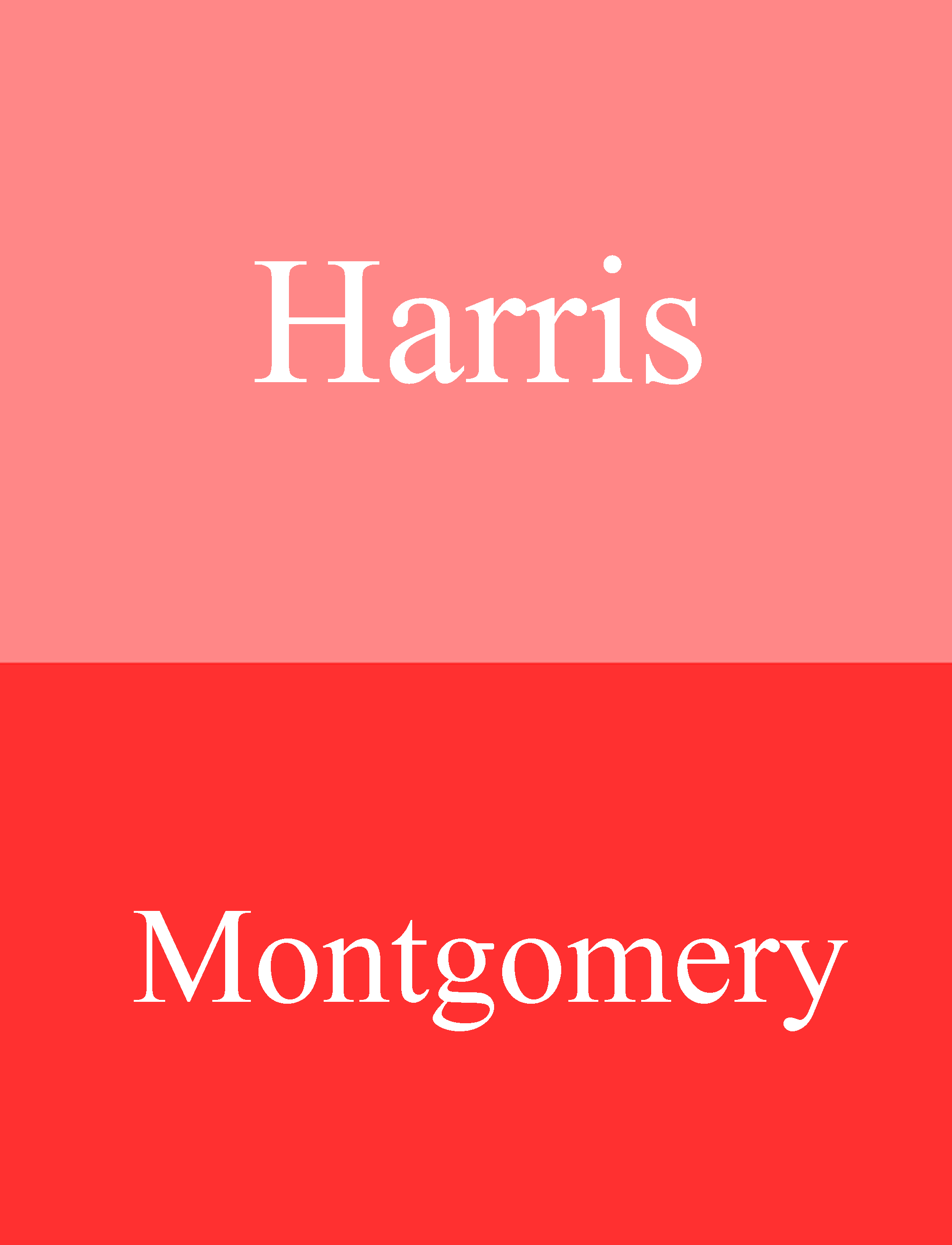
Cartogram of Texas' 2nd congressional district

=== General election ===
==== Predictions ====
Source	Ranking	As of
The Cook Political Report	Solid R	February 2, 2023
Inside Elections	Solid R	November 13, 2023
Sabato's Crystal Ball	Safe R	February 23, 2023
Elections Daily	Safe R	September 7, 2023
CNalysis	Solid R	November 16, 2023
Decision Desk HQ	Safe R	June 14, 2024

==== Results ====
2024 Texas's 2nd congressional district election
Party	Candidate	Votes	%
Republican	Dan Crenshaw (incumbent)	214,631	65.66
Democratic	Peter Filler	112,252	34.34
Total votes		326,883	100.00
Republican hold			

==== By county ====
County	Dan Crenshaw Republican		Peter Filler Democratic		Margin		Total votes cast
County	#	%	#	%	#	%	Total votes cast
Harris	107,188	61.64%	66,693	38.36%	40,495	23.29%	173,881
Montgomery	107,443	70.22%	45,559	29.78%	61,884	40.45%	153,002
Totals	214,631	65.66%	112,252	34.34%	102,379	31.32%	326,883

== District 3 ==
2024 Texas's 3rd congressional district election
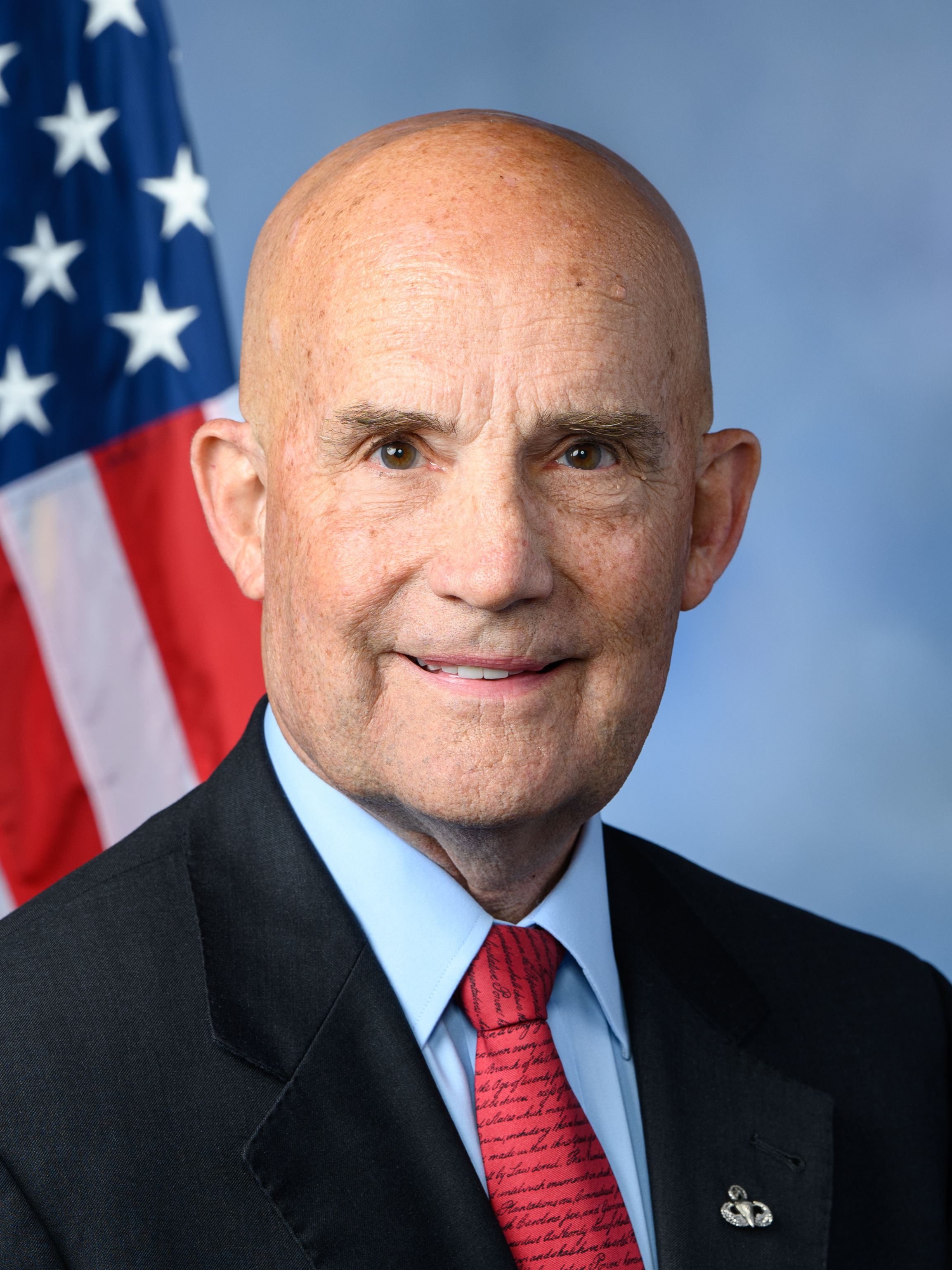

Nominee	Keith Self	Sandeep Srivastava
Party	Republican	Democratic
Popular vote	237,794	142,953
Percentage	62.5%	37.6%
- Self: 50–60% 60–70% 70–80% 80–90% >90% Srivastava: 50–60% 60–70% 70–80% >90%
U.S. Representative before election
Keith Self
Republican
Elected U.S. Representative
Keith Self
Republican

The 3rd district encompasses much of Collin County and Hunt County. The incumbent was Republican Keith Self, who was elected with 60.55% of the vote in 2022.

=== Republican primary ===
==== Nominee ====
- Keith Self, incumbent U.S. representative

==== Eliminated in primary ====
- Suzanne Harp, financial executive and candidate for this district in 2022
- Jeremy Ivanovskis, police officer and candidate for this district in 2022
- Tre Pennie, police officer and nominee for the 30th district in 2020
- John Porro, hospital executive and candidate for the 1st district in 2022

==== Withdrawn ====
- Burt Thakur, engineering project manager and candidate for California's 25th congressional district in 2022 (switched to the 26th district)

==== Endorsements ====
Keith Self

Executive branch officials

- Donald Trump, 45th president of the United States

Organizations

- AIPAC
- National Rifle Association Political Victory Fund
- Texas Alliance for Life

==== Fundraising ====
Campaign finance reports as of February 14, 2024
Candidate	Raised	Spent	Cash on hand
Suzanne Harp (R)	$46,454	$46,498	$0
Jeremy Ivanovskis (R)	$3,980	$3,996	$0
Tre Pennie (R)	$61,918 (Note: $1,000 of this total was self-funded by Pennie)	$60,695	$1,223
John Porro (R)	$117,398 (Note: $50,000 of this total was self-funded by Porro)	$103,495	$15,709
Keith Self (R)	$480,102	$222,806	$282,210
Source: Federal Election Commission

==== Results ====
Republican primary results
Party	Candidate	Votes	%
Republican	Keith Self (incumbent)	55,888	72.8
Republican	Suzanne Harp	14,215	18.5
Republican	Tre Pennie	2,797	3.6
Republican	John Porro	2,634	3.4
Republican	Jeremy Ivanovskis	1,224	1.6
Total votes		76,758	100.0

=== Democratic primary ===
==== Nominee ====
- Sandeep Srivastava, realtor and nominee for this district in 2022

==== Fundraising ====
Campaign finance reports as of February 14, 2024
Candidate	Raised	Spent	Cash on hand
Sandeep Srivastava (D)	$286,468 (Note: $200,000 of this total was self-funded by Srivastava)	$223,277	$66,783
Source: Federal Election Commission

==== Results ====
Democratic primary results
Party	Candidate	Votes	%
Democratic	Sandeep Srivastava	17,422	100.0
Total votes		17,422	100.0

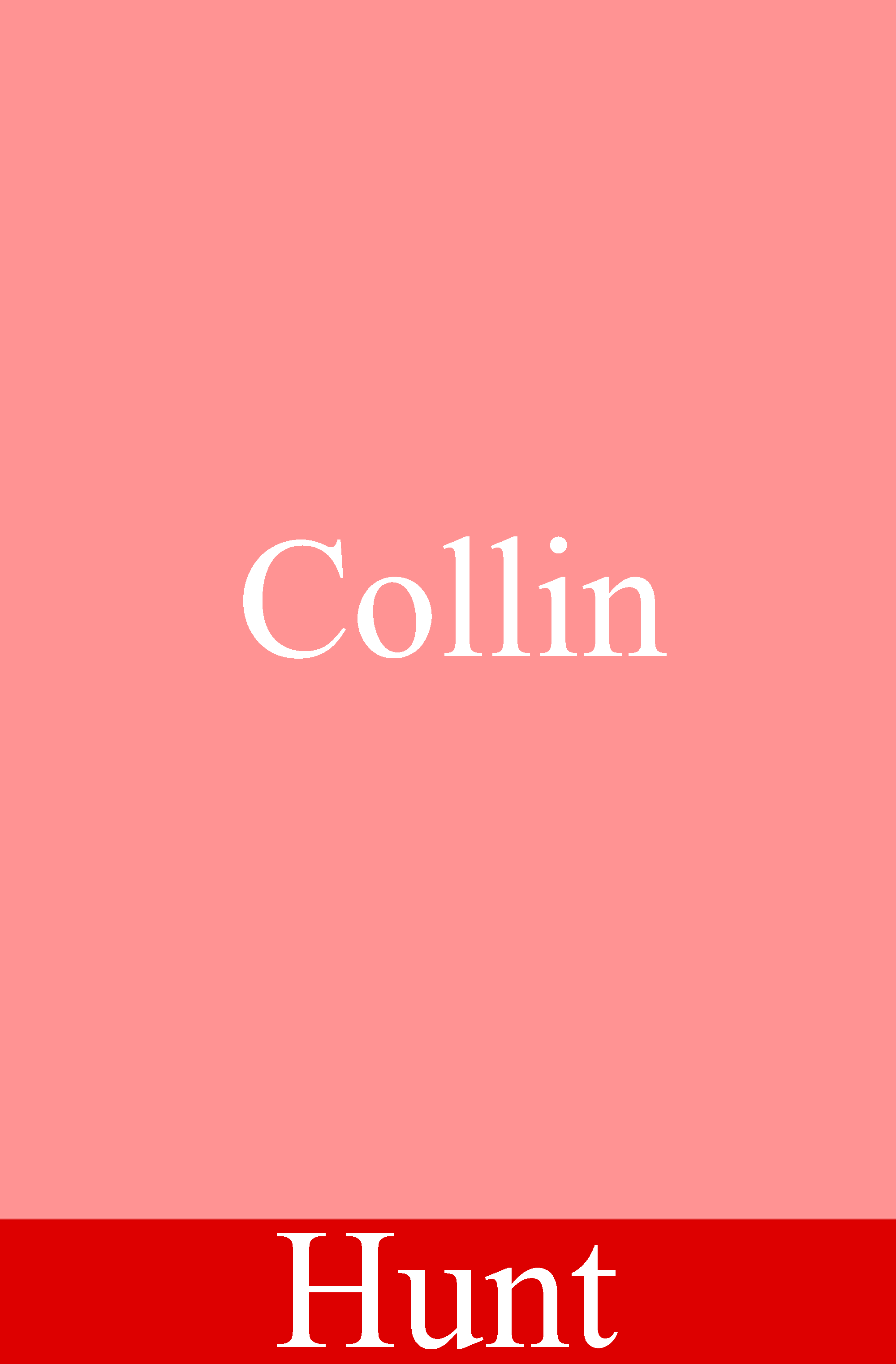
Cartogram of Texas' 3rd congressional district

=== General election ===
==== Predictions ====
Source	Ranking	As of
The Cook Political Report	Solid R	February 2, 2023
Inside Elections	Solid R	November 13, 2023
Sabato's Crystal Ball	Safe R	February 23, 2023
Elections Daily	Safe R	September 7, 2023
CNalysis	Solid R	November 16, 2023
Decision Desk HQ	Safe R	June 14, 2024

==== Endorsements ====
Keith Self

Newspapers

- The Dallas Morning News

==== Results ====
2024 Texas's 3rd congressional district election
Party	Candidate	Votes	%
Republican	Keith Self (incumbent)	237,794	62.5
Democratic	Sandeep Srivastava	142,953	37.6
Total votes		380,747	100.0
Republican hold			

==== By county ====
County	Keith Self Republican		Sandeep Srivastava Democratic		Margin		Total votes cast
County	#	%	#	%	#	%	Total votes cast
Collin	206,337	60.59%	134,232	39.41%	72,105	21.17%	340,569
Hunt	31,457	78.29%	8,721	21.71%	22,736	56.59%	40,178
Totals	237,794	62.45%	142,953	37.55%	94,841	24.91%	380,747

== District 4 ==
2024 Texas's 4th congressional district election
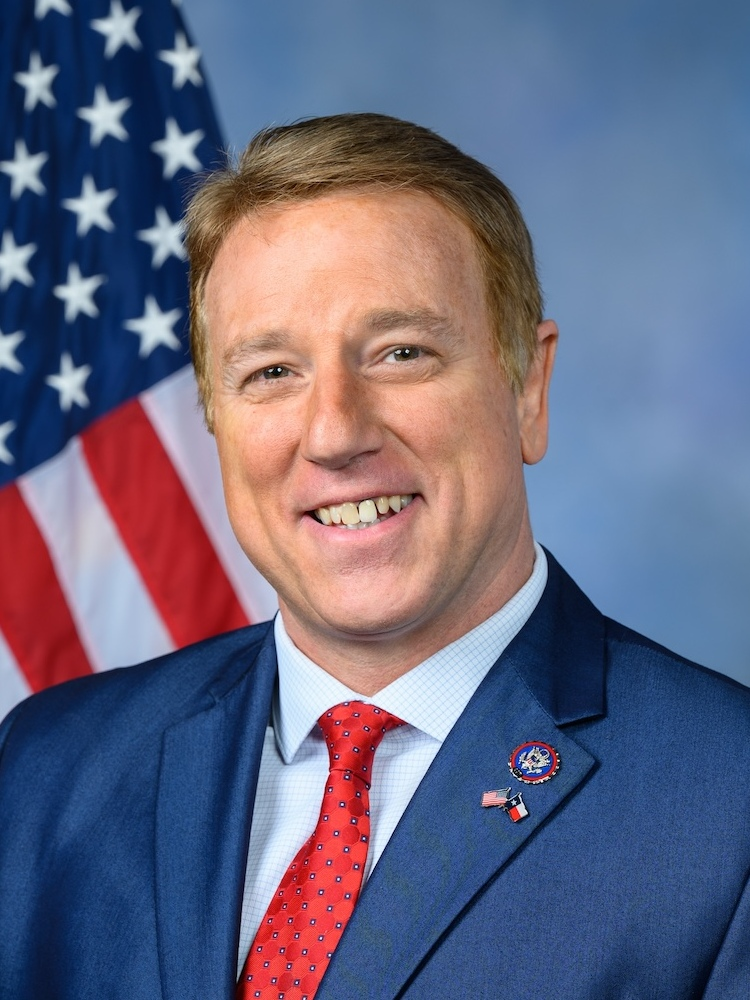

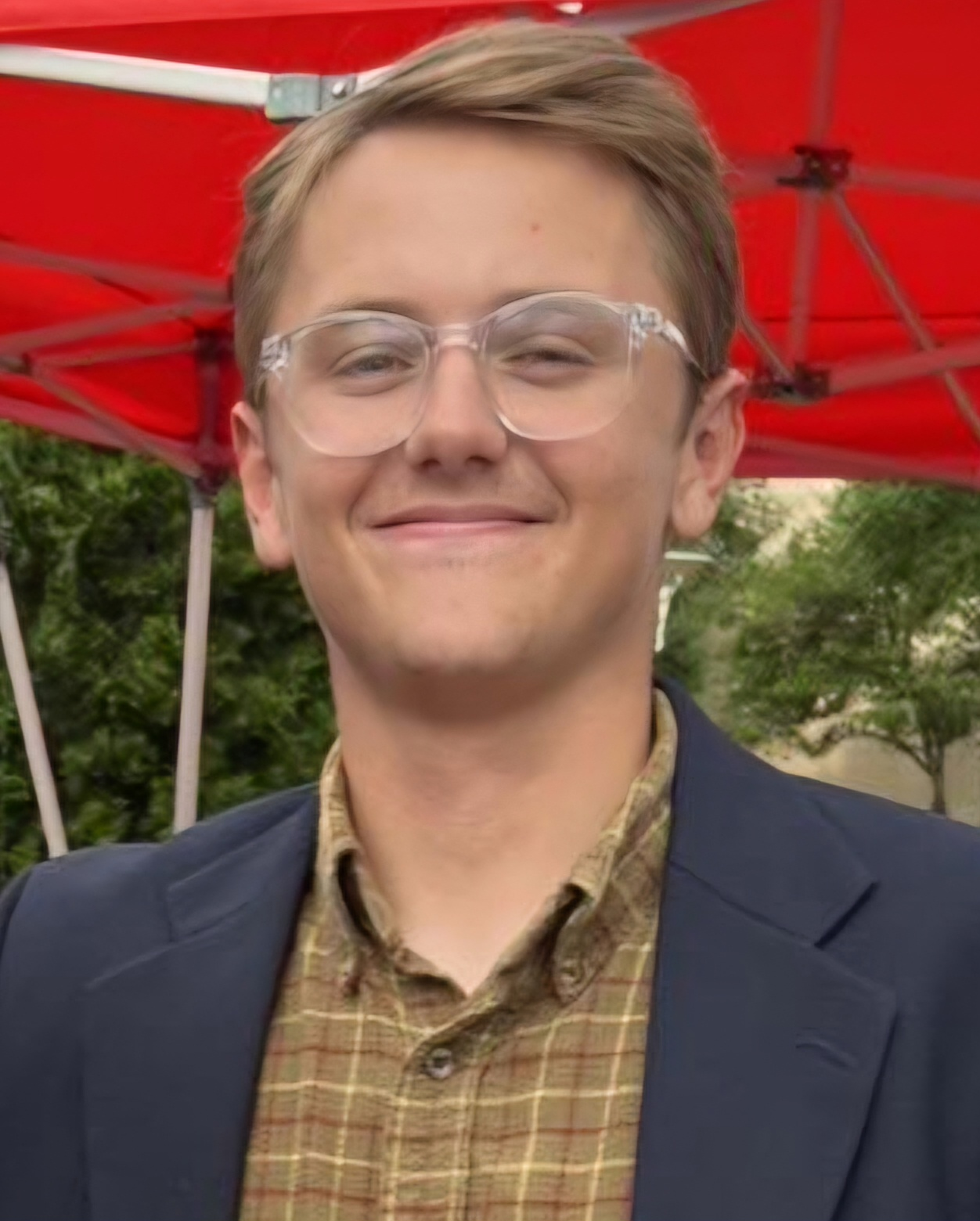
Nominee	Pat Fallon	Simon Cardell
Party	Republican	Democratic
Popular vote	241,603	111,696
Percentage	68.4%	31.6%
- Fallon: 50–60% 60–70% 70–80% 80–90% >90% Cardell: 50–60% 60–70% No votes
U.S. Representative before election
Pat Fallon
Republican
Elected U.S. Representative
Pat Fallon
Republican

The incumbent was Republican Pat Fallon, who was re-elected with 66.71% of the vote in 2022. On November 13, 2023, Fallon announced he would not seek another term in Congress and would instead run for his old seat in the Texas Senate. However, the next day, Fallon reversed course and said he would run for re-election to the House.

=== Republican primary ===
==== Nominee ====
- Pat Fallon, incumbent U.S. representative

==== Eliminated in primary ====
- Don Horn, farmer

==== Declined ====
- Matt Shaheen, state representative (ran for re-election)

==== Endorsements ====
Pat Fallon

Executive branch officials

- Donald Trump, 45th president of the United States

Organizations

- AIPAC
- National Rifle Association Political Victory Fund
- Texas Alliance for Life
- Texas Medical Association PAC

==== Fundraising ====
Campaign finance reports as of February 14, 2024
Candidate	Raised	Spent	Cash on hand
Pat Fallon (R)	$384,116	$177,454	$464,251
Source: Federal Election Commission

==== Results ====
Republican primary results
Party	Candidate	Votes	%
Republican	Pat Fallon (incumbent)	70,801	80.3
Republican	Don Horn	17,396	19.7
Total votes		88,197	100.0

=== Democratic primary ===
==== Nominee ====
- Simon Cardell, consultant

==== Results ====
Democratic primary results
Party	Candidate	Votes	%
Democratic	Simon Cardell	14,954	100.0
Total votes		14,954	100.0

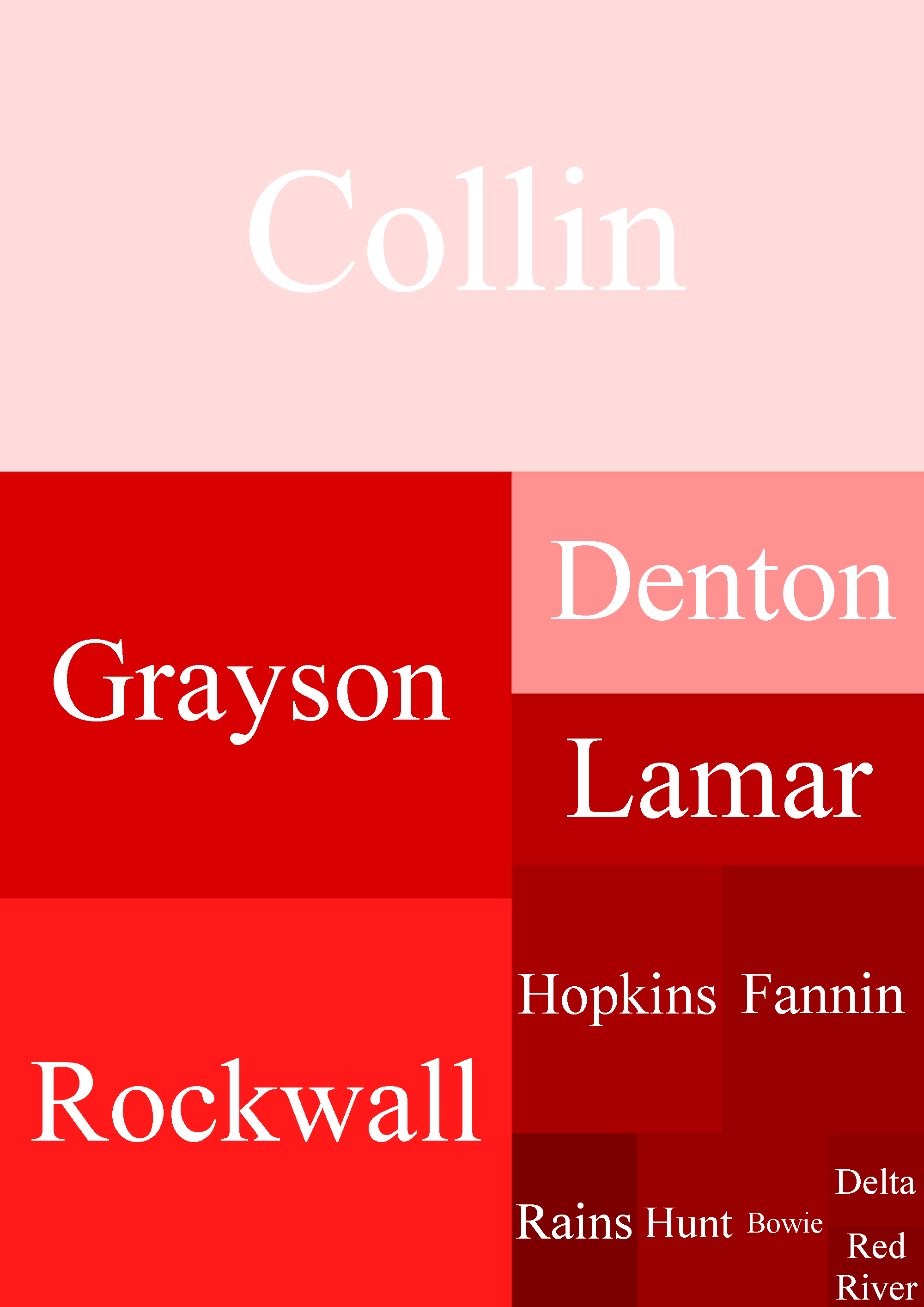
Cartogram of Texas' 4th congressional district

=== General election ===
==== Predictions ====
Source	Ranking	As of
The Cook Political Report	Solid R	February 2, 2023
Inside Elections	Solid R	March 10, 2023
Sabato's Crystal Ball	Safe R	February 23, 2023
Elections Daily	Safe R	September 7, 2023
CNalysis	Solid R	November 16, 2023
Decision Desk HQ	Safe R	June 14, 2024

==== Results ====
2024 Texas's 4th congressional district election
Party	Candidate	Votes	%
Republican	Pat Fallon (incumbent)	241,603	68.4
Democratic	Simon Cardell	111,696	31.6
Total votes		353,299	100.0
Republican hold			

==== By county ====
County	Pat Fallon Republican		Simon Cardell Democratic		Margin		Total votes cast
County	#	%	#	%	#	%	Total votes cast
Bowie	3,724	84.48%	684	15.52%	3,040	68.97%	4,408
Collin	68,280	53.52%	59,291	46.48%	8,989	7.05%	127,571
Delta	2,217	85.73%	369	14.27%	1,848	71.46%	2,586
Denton	16,350	60.84%	10,523	39.16%	5,827	21.68%	26,873
Fannin	13,656	84.88%	2,432	15.12%	11,224	69.77%	16,088
Grayson	50,737	79.22%	13,309	20.78%	37,428	58.44%	64,046
Hopkins	13,685	83.40%	2,723	16.60%	10,962	66.81%	16,408
Hunt	4,458	85.09%	781	14.91%	3,677	70.19%	5,239
Lamar	16,850	81.77%	3,757	18.23%	13,093	63.54%	20,607
Rains	5,644	87.64%	796	12.36%	4,848	75.28%	6,440
Red River	1,455	87.07%	216	12.93%	1,239	74.15%	1,671
Rockwall	44,547	72.60%	16,815	27.40%	27,732	45.19%	61,362
Totals	241,603	68.38%	111,696	31.62%	129,907	36.77%	353,299

== District 5 ==
2024 Texas's 5th congressional district election
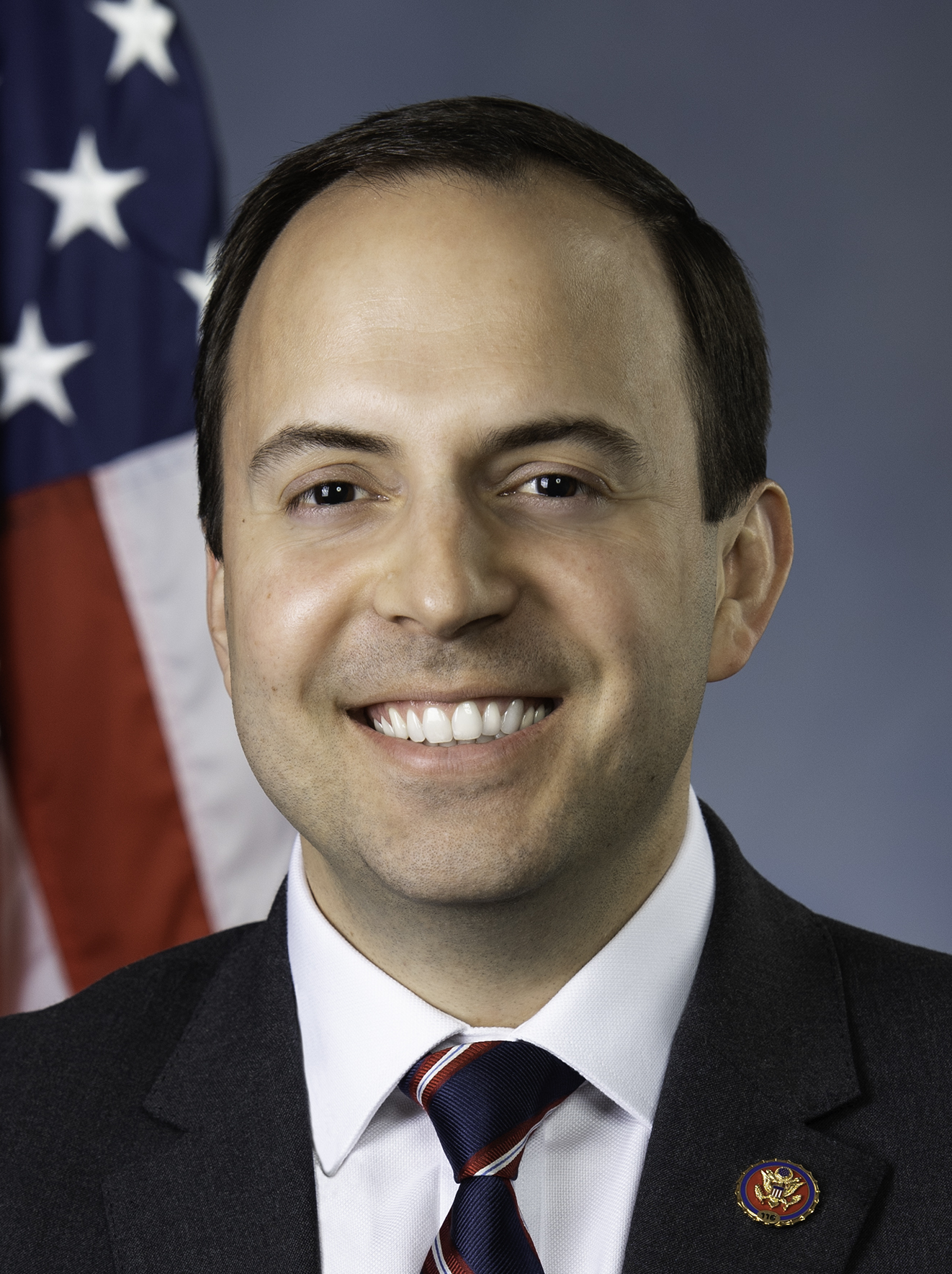

Nominee	Lance Gooden	Ruth Torres
Party	Republican	Democratic
Popular vote	192,185	107,712
Percentage	64.1%	35.9%
- Gooden: 50–60% 60–70% 70–80% 80–90% >90% Torres: 50–60% 60–70% 70–80% 80–90% No votes
U.S. Representative before election
Lance Gooden
Republican
Elected U.S. Representative
Lance Gooden
Republican

The incumbent was Republican Lance Gooden, who was re-elected with 64.01% of the vote in 2022.

=== Republican primary ===
==== Nominee ====
- Lance Gooden, incumbent U.S. representative

==== Endorsements ====
Lance Gooden

Executive branch officials

- Donald Trump, 45th president of the United States

Organizations

- AIPAC
- National Rifle Association Political Victory Fund
- Texas Alliance for Life
- Texas Medical Association PAC

==== Fundraising ====
Campaign finance reports as of February 14, 2024
Candidate	Raised	Spent	Cash on hand
Lance Gooden (R)	$735,801	$560,876	$645,143
Source: Federal Election Commission

==== Results ====
Republican primary results
Party	Candidate	Votes	%
Republican	Lance Gooden (incumbent)	59,069	100.0
Total votes		59,069	100.0

=== Democratic primary ===
==== Nominee ====
- Ruth Torres, HR consultant and write-in candidate for this district in 2022

==== Fundraising ====
Campaign finance reports as of February 14, 2024
Candidate	Raised	Spent	Cash on hand
Ruth Torres (D)	$6,876 (Note: $2,800 of this total was self-funded by Torres)	$6,778	$108
Source: Federal Election Commission

==== Results ====
Democratic primary results
Party	Candidate	Votes	%
Democratic	Ruth Torres	17,145	100.0
Total votes		17,145	100.0

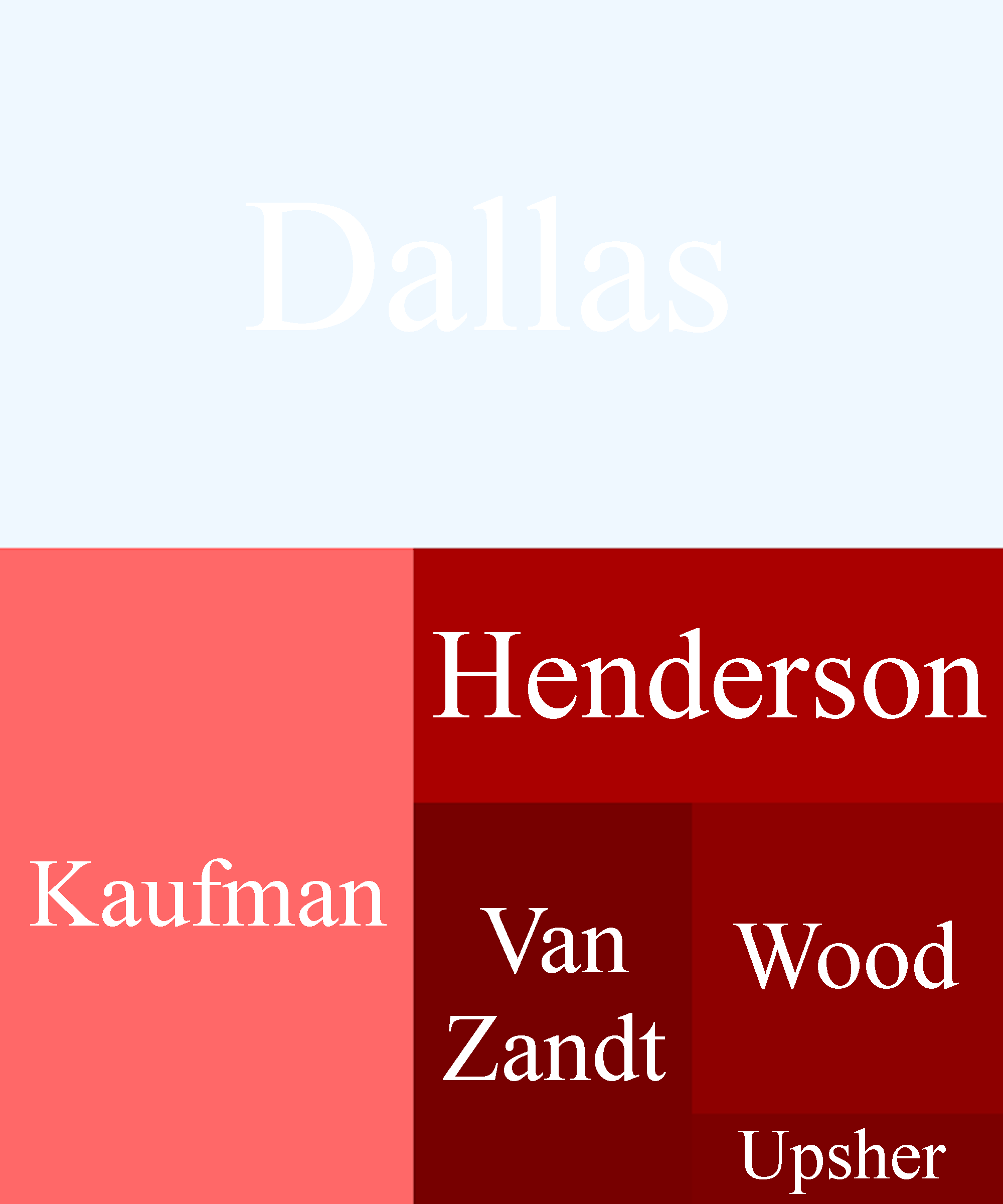
Cartogram of Texas' 5th congressional district

=== General election ===
==== Predictions ====
Source	Ranking	As of
The Cook Political Report	Solid R	February 2, 2023
Inside Elections	Solid R	March 10, 2023
Sabato's Crystal Ball	Safe R	February 23, 2023
Elections Daily	Safe R	September 7, 2023
CNalysis	Solid R	November 16, 2023
Decision Desk HQ	Safe R	June 14, 2024

==== Results ====
2024 Texas's 5th congressional district election
Party	Candidate	Votes	%
Republican	Lance Gooden (incumbent)	192,185	64.1
Democratic	Ruth Torres	107,712	35.9
Total votes		299,897	100.0
Republican hold			

==== By county ====
County	Lance Gooden Republican		Ruth Torres Democratic		Margin		Total votes cast
County	#	%	#	%	#	%	Total votes cast
Dallas	66,365	48.59%	70,227	51.41%	−3,862	−2.83%	136,592
Henderson	31,146	83.22%	6,281	16.78%	24,865	66.44%	37,427
Kaufman	43,491	64.69%	23,736	35.31%	19,755	29.39%	67,227
Upshur	6,039	87.78%	841	12.22%	5,198	75.55%	6,880
Van Zandt	24,436	88.20%	3,269	11.80%	21,167	76.40%	27,705
Wood	20,708	86.05%	3,358	13.95%	17,350	72.09%	24,066
Totals	192,185	64.08%	107,712	35.92%	84,473	28.17%	299,897

== District 6 ==
2024 Texas's 6th congressional district election
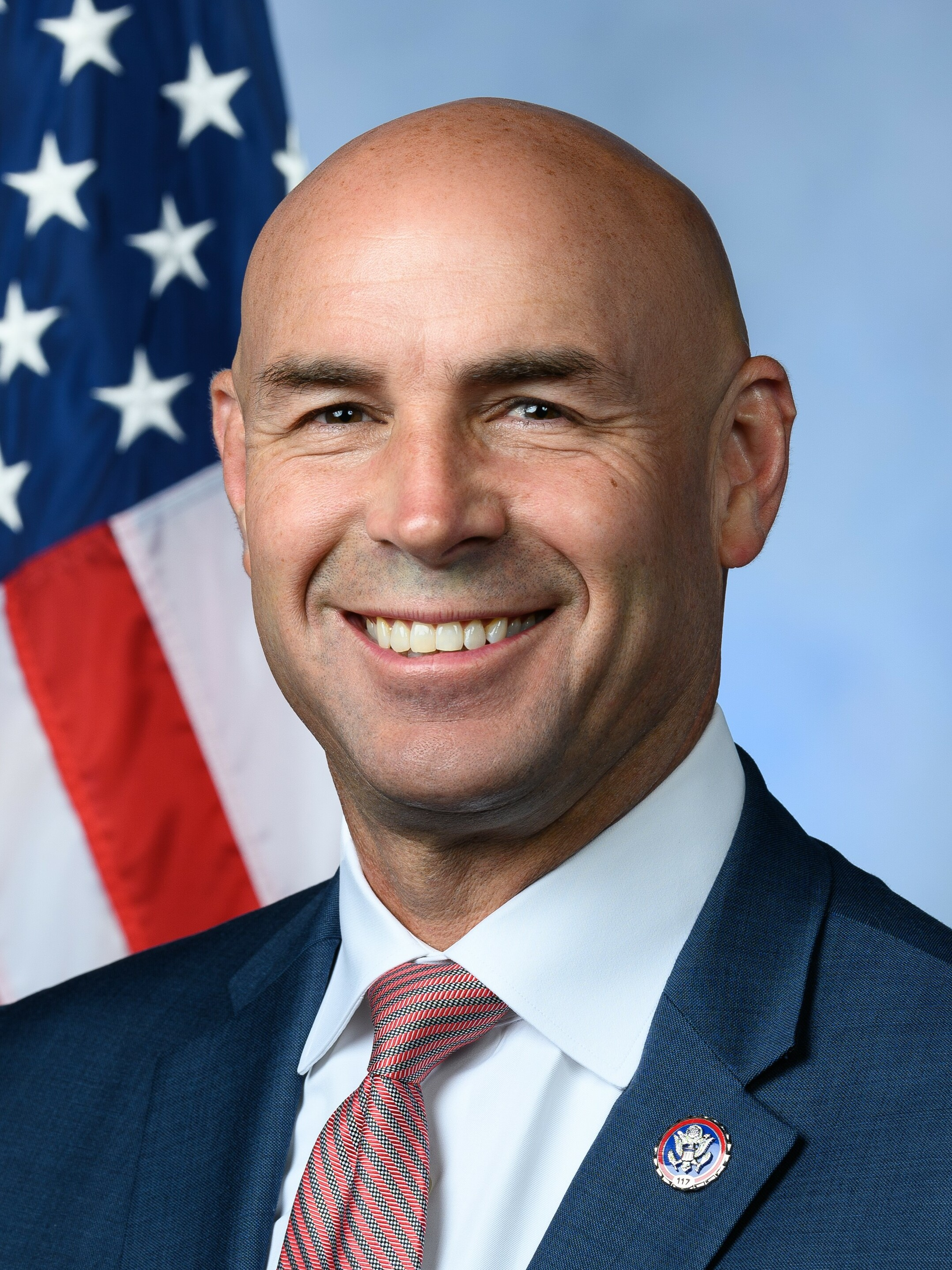

Nominee	Jake Ellzey	John Love III
Party	Republican	Democratic
Popular vote	188,119	98,319
Percentage	65.68%	34.32%
- Ellzey: 50–60% 60–70% 70–80% 80–90% >90% Love: 50–60% 60–70% 70–80% 80–90% Tie: 50% No votes
U.S. Representative before election
Jake Ellzey
Republican
Elected U.S. Representative
Jake Ellzey
Republican

The 6th district encompasses Ellis County and Palestine. The incumbent was Republican Jake Ellzey, who was re-elected unopposed in 2022.

=== Republican primary ===
==== Nominee ====
- Jake Ellzey, incumbent U.S. representative

==== Eliminated in primary ====
- James Buford, maintenance supervisor and candidate for this district in 2022
- Cliff Wiley, high school teacher

==== Endorsements ====
Jake Ellzey

Organizations

- AIPAC
- National Rifle Association Political Victory Fund
- Pro-Israel America (post-primary)
- Texas Alliance for Life
- Texas Medical Association PAC
- With Honor Fund

==== Fundraising ====
Campaign finance reports as of February 14, 2024
Candidate	Raised	Spent	Cash on hand
James Buford (R)	$10,343	$8,317	$2,026
Jake Ellzey (R)	$3,545,245	$3,150,691	$992,228
Cliff Wiley (R)	$16,015	$17,100	$0
Source: Federal Election Commission

==== Results ====
Republican primary results
Party	Candidate	Votes	%
Republican	Jake Ellzey (incumbent)	38,143	60.8
Republican	James Buford	12,782	20.4
Republican	Cliff Wiley	11,843	18.9
Total votes		62,768	100.0

=== Democratic primary ===
==== Nominee ====
- John Love III, former Midland city councilor and candidate for U.S. Senate in 2020

==== Fundraising ====
Campaign finance reports as of February 14, 2024
Candidate	Raised	Spent	Cash on hand
John Love III (D)	$57,668	$52,895	$5,425
Source: Federal Election Commission

==== Results ====
Democratic primary results
Party	Candidate	Votes	%
Democratic	John Love III	13,813	100.0
Total votes		13,813	100.0

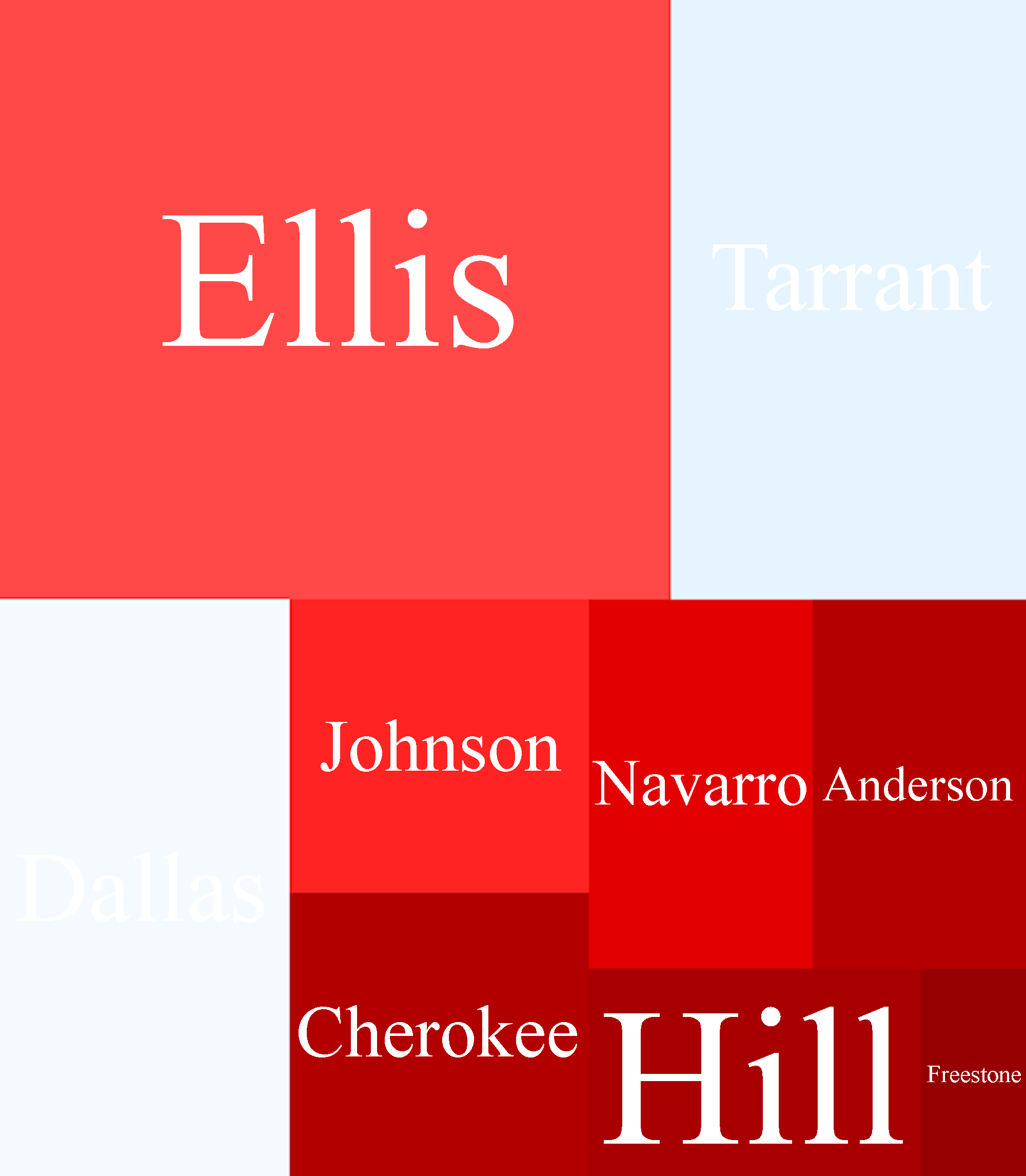
Cartogram of Texas' 16th congressional district

=== General election ===
==== Predictions ====
Source	Ranking	As of
The Cook Political Report	Solid R	February 2, 2023
Inside Elections	Solid R	November 13, 2023
Sabato's Crystal Ball	Safe R	February 23, 2023
Elections Daily	Safe R	September 7, 2023
CNalysis	Solid R	November 16, 2023
Decision Desk HQ	Safe R	June 14, 2024

==== Endorsements ====
Jake Ellzey

Newspapers

- The Dallas Morning News

==== Results ====
2024 Texas's 6th congressional district election
Party	Candidate	Votes	%
Republican	Jake Ellzey (incumbent)	188,119	65.68
Democratic	John Love III	98,319	34.32
Total votes		286,438	100.0
Republican hold			

==== By county ====
County	Jake Ellzey Republican		John Love III Democratic		Margin		Total votes cast
County	#	%	#	%	#	%	Total votes cast
Anderson	15,347	81.88%	3,397	18.12%	11,950	63.75%	18,744
Cherokee	16,515	82.41%	3,526	17.59%	12,989	64.81%	20,041
Dallas	19,343	48.93%	20,187	51.07%	−844	−2.14%	39,530
Ellis	64,644	67.76%	30,759	32.24%	33,885	35.52%	95,403
Freestone	4,631	85.30%	798	14.70%	3,833	70.60%	5,429
Hill	13,573	83.19%	2,742	16.81%	10,831	66.39%	16,315
Johnson	14,913	71.47%	5,953	28.53%	8,960	42.94%	20,866
Navarro	15,200	77.72%	4,358	22.28%	10,842	55.44%	19,558
Tarrant	23,953	47.38%	26,599	52.62%	−2,646	−5.23%	50,552
Totals	188,119	65.68%	98,319	34.32%	89,800	31.35%	286,438

== District 7 ==
2024 Texas's 7th congressional district election
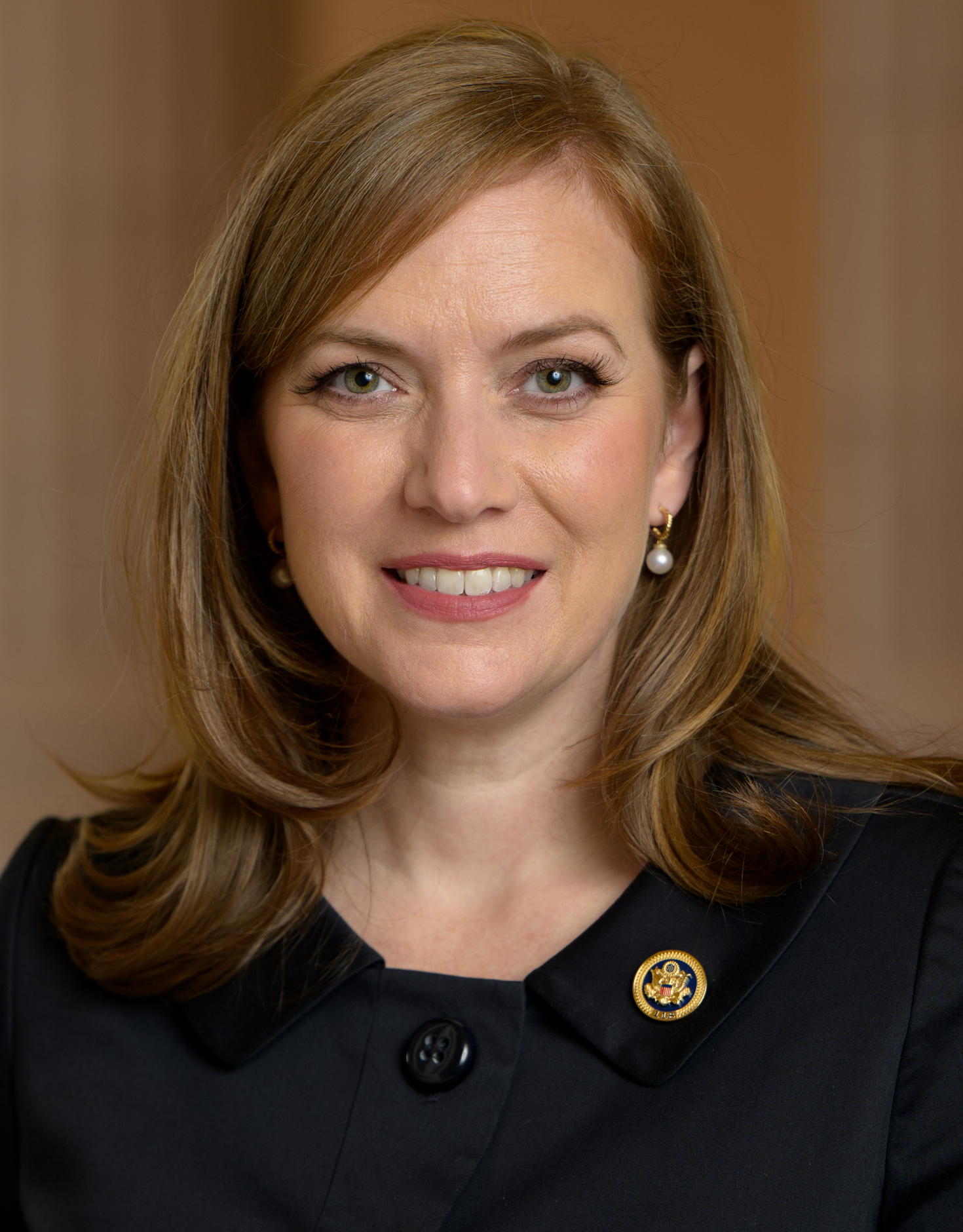

Nominee	Lizzie Fletcher	Caroline Kane
Party	Democratic	Republican
Popular vote	148,406	94,204
Percentage	61.2%	38.8%
- Fletcher: 50–60% 60–70% 70–80% 80–90% >90% Kane: 50–60% 70–80% >90% No votes
U.S. Representative before election
Lizzie Fletcher
Democratic
Elected U.S. Representative
Lizzie Fletcher
Democratic

The 7th district encompasses the suburbs of Houston such as Gulfton and Alief. The incumbent was Democrat Lizzie Fletcher, who was re-elected with 63.79% of the vote in 2022.

Renewable energy developer Pervez Agwan announced a Democratic primary challenge to Fletcher in February 2023, and was endorsed by a handful of progressive organizations and figures, including the Houston branch of the Democratic Socialists of America. In December 2023, following allegations of sexual harassment leveled against Agwan and mass resignations by junior campaign staffers, the Houston DSA rescinded its endorsement. Further allegations of sexual harassment by Agwan and senior campaign figures were reported on by The New Republic.

=== Democratic primary ===
==== Nominee ====
- Lizzie Fletcher, incumbent U.S. representative

==== Eliminated in primary ====
- Pervez Agwan, renewable energy developer

==== Endorsements ====
Pervez Agwan

Statewide officials

- Keith Ellison, Minnesota attorney general (2019–present) and former U.S. representative from Minnesota's 5th congressional district (2007–2019)

Individuals

- Howie Klein, former president of Reprise Records (1989–2001) and adjunct professor at McGill University
- Heather Digby Parton, political blogger

Organizations

- Houston Sunrise Movement
Lizzie Fletcher

Organizations

- AIPAC
- Democratic Majority for Israel
- Feminist Majority PAC
- Giffords (post-primary)
- Houston LGBTQ+ Political Caucus
- Humane Society Legislative Fund
- Joint Action Committee for Political Affairs
- League of Conservation Voters
- National Organization for Women PAC
- National Women's Political Caucus
- Planned Parenthood Action Fund
- Population Connection Action Fund
- Pro-Israel America (post-primary)
- Texas Medical Association PAC

Labor unions

- National Education Association
- Texas AFL-CIO
- Texas American Federation of Teachers
- United Auto Workers

Newspapers

- Houston Chronicle

==== Fundraising ====
Campaign finance reports as of February 14, 2024
Candidate	Raised	Spent	Cash on hand
Pervez Agwan (D)	$1,554,838	$1,407,463	$147,375
Lizzie Fletcher (D)	$1,422,349	$1,007,429	$1,736,626
Source: Federal Election Commission

==== Polling ====
Poll source	Date(s) administered	Sample size (Note: Key: A – all adults RV – registered voters LV – likely voters V – unclear)	Margin of error	Pervez Agwan	Lizzie Fletcher	Undecided
University of Houston	February 7–17, 2024	350 (LV)	± 5.2%	11%	78%	11%

==== Results ====
Democratic primary results
Party	Candidate	Votes	%
Democratic	Lizzie Fletcher (incumbent)	27,902	74.2
Democratic	Pervez Agwan	9,679	25.8
Total votes		37,581	100.0

=== Republican primary ===
==== Nominee ====
- Caroline Kane, real-estate broker

==== Eliminated in runoff ====
- Kenneth Omoruyi, accountant and tax advisor

==== Eliminated in primary ====
- Tina Blum Cohen, furniture-company owner and candidate for this district in 2022
- Carolyn Bryant, realtor

==== Fundraising ====
Campaign finance reports as of February 14, 2024
Candidate	Raised	Spent	Cash on hand
Tina Blum Cohen (R)	$100,105	$34,106	$99,417
Carolyn Bryant (R)	$14,026	$13,621	$405
Caroline Kane (R)	$51,711 (Note: $12,100 of this total was self-funded by Kane)	$52,537	$0
Kenneth Omoruyi (R)	$106,775 (Note: $31,300 of this total was self-funded by Omoruyi)	$103,620	$3,154
Source: Federal Election Commission

==== Results ====
Republican primary results
Party	Candidate	Votes	%
Republican	Kenneth Omoruyi	9,834	41.9
Republican	Caroline Kane	5,764	24.6
Republican	Carolyn Bryant	4,382	18.7
Republican	Tina Blum Cohen	3,489	14.9
Total votes		23,469	100.0

==== Primary runoff results ====
Republican primary results
Party	Candidate	Votes	%
Republican	Caroline Kane	2,539	50.4
Republican	Kenneth Omoruyi	2,495	49.6
Total votes		5,034	100.0

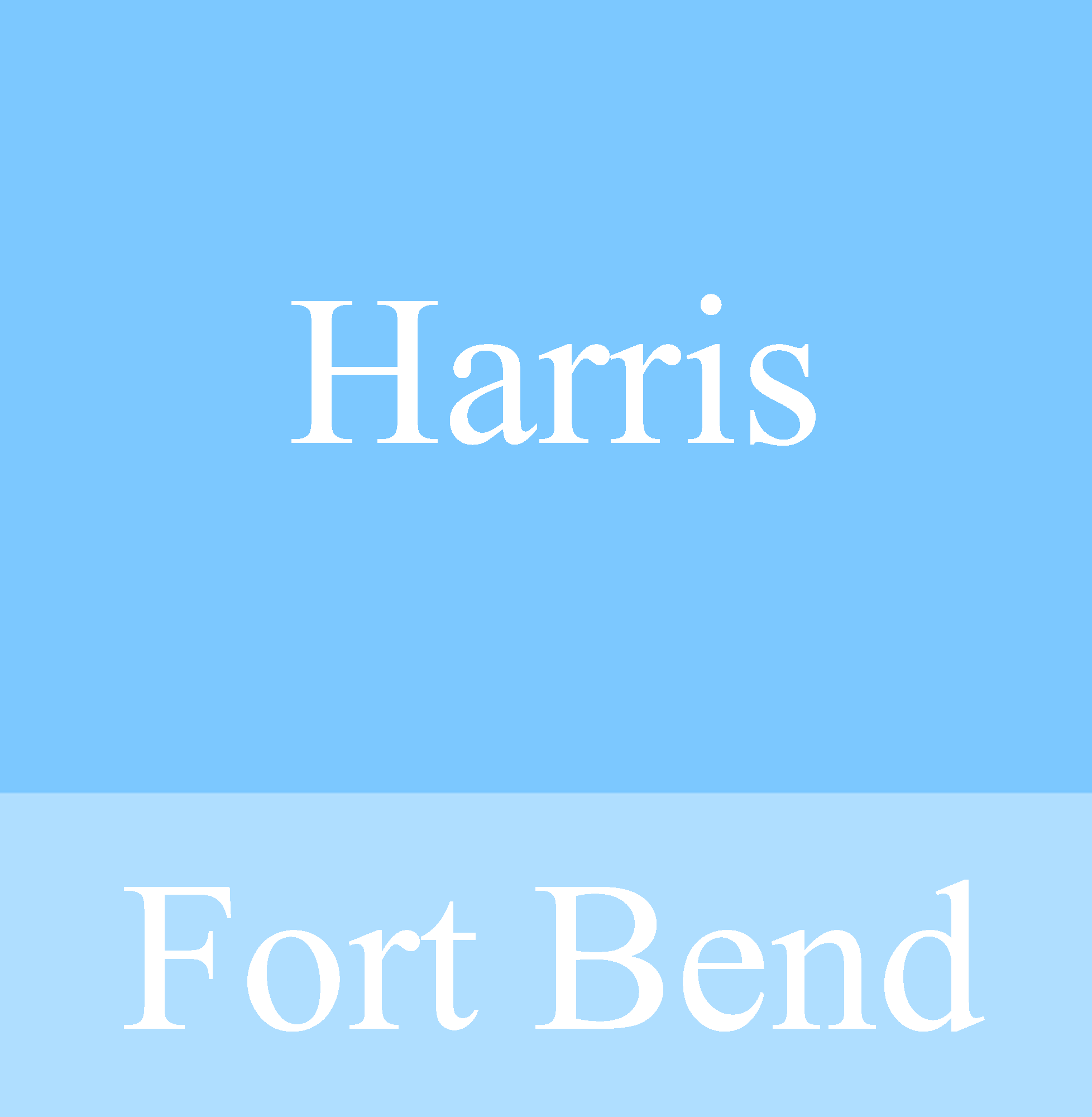
Cartogram of Texas' 7th congressional district

=== General election ===
==== Predictions ====
Source	Ranking	As of
The Cook Political Report	Solid D	February 2, 2023
Inside Elections	Solid D	November 13, 2023
Sabato's Crystal Ball	Safe D	February 23, 2023
Elections Daily	Safe D	September 7, 2023
CNalysis	Solid D	November 16, 2023
Decision Desk HQ	Safe D	June 14, 2024

==== Results ====
2024 Texas's 7th congressional district election
Party	Candidate	Votes	%
Democratic	Lizzie Fletcher (incumbent)	148,406	61.2
Republican	Caroline Kane	94,204	38.8
Total votes		242,610	100.0
Democratic hold			

==== By county ====
County	Lizzie Fletcher Democratic		Caroline Kane Republican		Margin		Total votes cast
County	#	%	#	%	#	%	Total votes cast
Fort Bend	41,044	57.78%	29,989	42.20%	11,055	15.56%	71,033
Harris	108,776	62.72%	64,662	37.28%	44,114	25.44%	173,438
Totals	149,820	61.28%	94,651	38.72%	55,169	22.57%	244,471

== District 8 ==
2024 Texas's 8th congressional district election
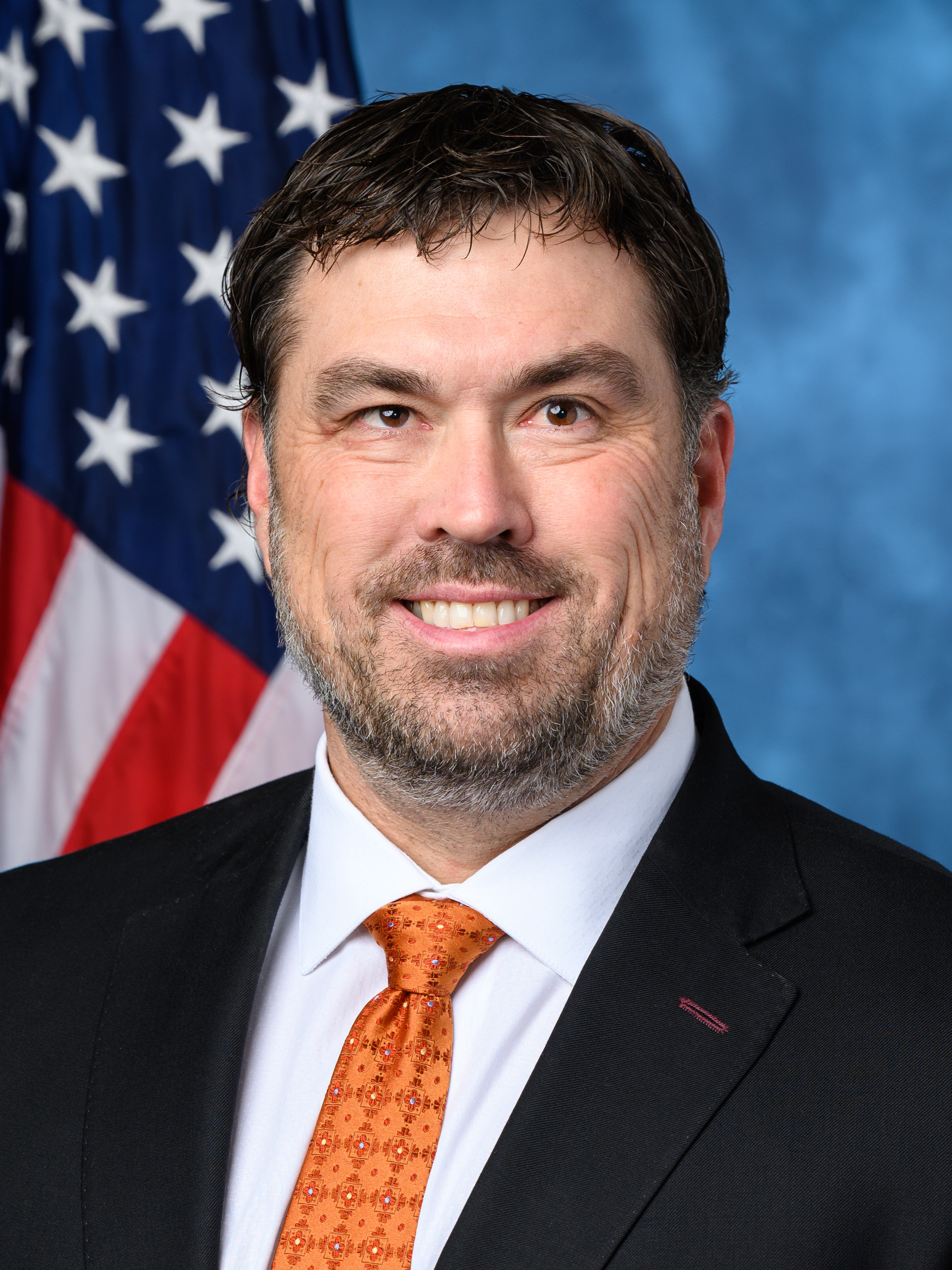

Nominee	Morgan Luttrell	Laura Jones
Party	Republican	Democratic
Popular vote	233,423	108,754
Percentage	68.2%	31.8%
- Luttrell: 50–60% 60–70% 70–80% 80–90% >90% Jones: 50–60% 60–70% 70–80% Tie: 50% No votes
U.S. Representative before election
Morgan Luttrell
Republican
Elected U.S. Representative
Morgan Luttrell
Republican

The 8th district includes northern suburbs and exurbs of Houston, such as Conroe and Willis. The incumbent was Republican Morgan Luttrell, who was elected with 68.07% of the vote in 2022.

=== Republican primary ===
==== Nominee ====
- Morgan Luttrell, incumbent U.S. representative

==== Endorsements ====
Morgan Luttrell

Organizations

- AIPAC
- National Rifle Association Political Victory Fund
- Texas Alliance for Life
- Texas Medical Association PAC

==== Fundraising ====
Campaign finance reports as of February 14, 2024
Candidate	Raised	Spent	Cash on hand
Morgan Luttrell (R)	$1,067,867	$727,093	$602,576
Source: Federal Election Commission

==== Results ====
Republican primary results
Party	Candidate	Votes	%
Republican	Morgan Luttrell (incumbent)	69,419	100.0
Total votes		69,419	100.0

=== Democratic primary ===
==== Nominee ====
- Laura Jones, former chair of the San Jacinto County Democratic Party and nominee for this district in 2022

==== Endorsements ====
Laura Jones

Labor unions

- Texas AFL-CIO
- United Auto Workers

==== Fundraising ====
Campaign finance reports as of February 14, 2024
Candidate	Raised	Spent	Cash on hand
Laura Jones (D)	$11,875	$5,979	$6,314
Source: Federal Election Commission

==== Results ====
Democratic primary results
Party	Candidate	Votes	%
Democratic	Laura Jones	14,390	100.0
Total votes		14,390	100.0

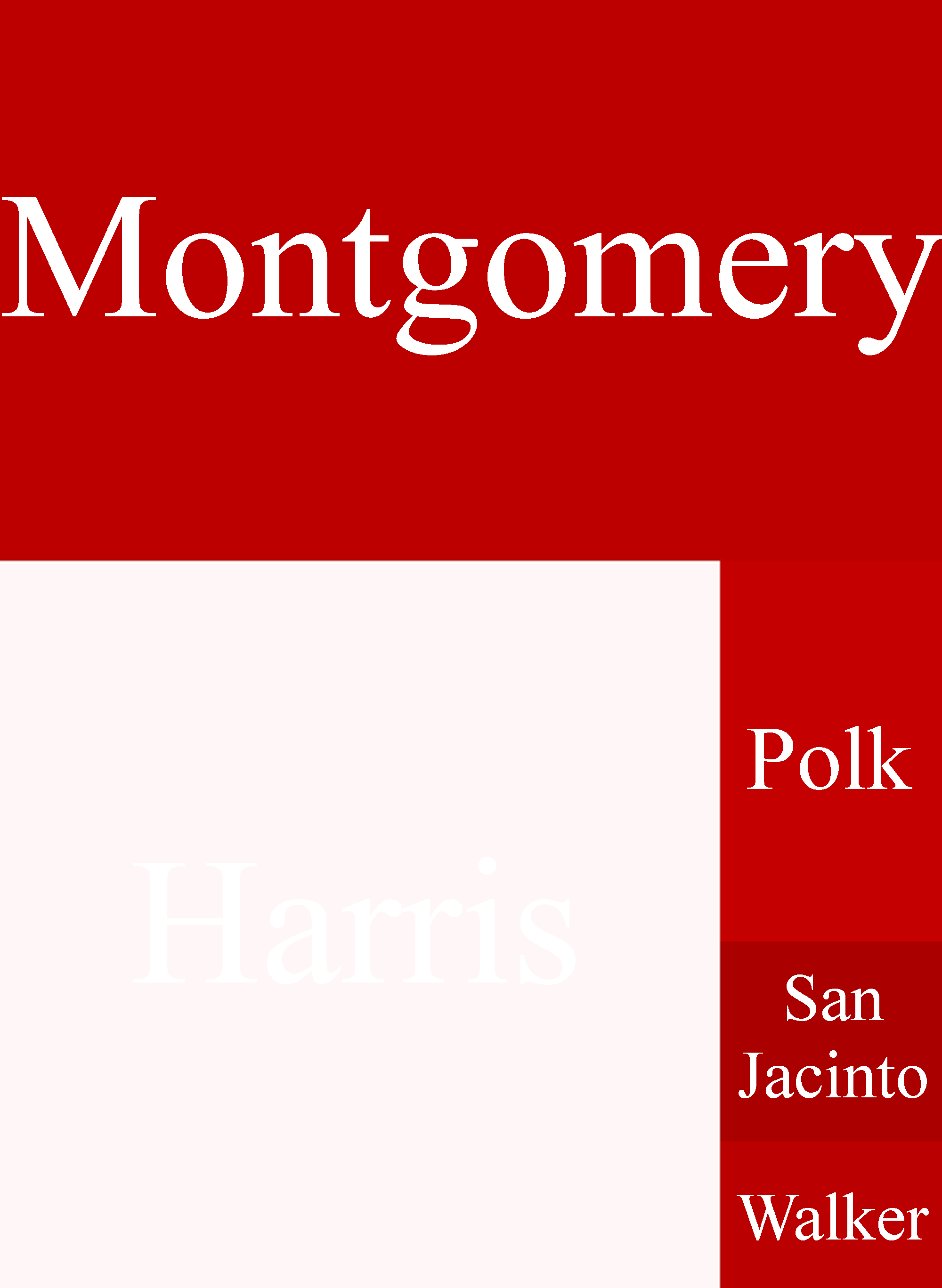
Cartogram of Texas' 8th congressional district

=== General election ===
==== Predictions ====
Source	Ranking	As of
The Cook Political Report	Solid R	February 2, 2023
Inside Elections	Solid R	November 13, 2023
Sabato's Crystal Ball	Safe R	February 23, 2023
Elections Daily	Safe R	September 7, 2023
CNalysis	Solid R	November 16, 2023
Decision Desk HQ	Safe R	June 14, 2024

==== Results ====
2024 Texas's 8th congressional district election
Party	Candidate	Votes	%
Republican	Morgan Luttrell (incumbent)	233,423	68.2
Democratic	Laura Jones	108,754	31.8
Total votes		342,177	100.0
Republican hold			

==== By county ====
County	Morgan Luttrell Republican		Laura Jones Democratic		Margin		Total votes cast
County	#	%	#	%	#	%	Total votes cast
Harris	74,586	50.64%	72,709	49.36%	1,877	1.27%	147,295
Montgomery	121,284	81.43%	27,653	18.58%	93,631	62.87%	148,937
Polk	19,267	80.85%	4,563	19.15%	14,704	61.70%	23,830
San Jacinto	10,460	83.33%	2,093	16.67%	8,367	66.65%	12,553
Walker	7,826	81.8%	1,736	18.2%	6,090	63.6%	9,562
Totals	233,423	68.22%	108,754	31.78%	124,669	36.43%	342,177

== District 9 ==
2024 Texas's 9th congressional district election
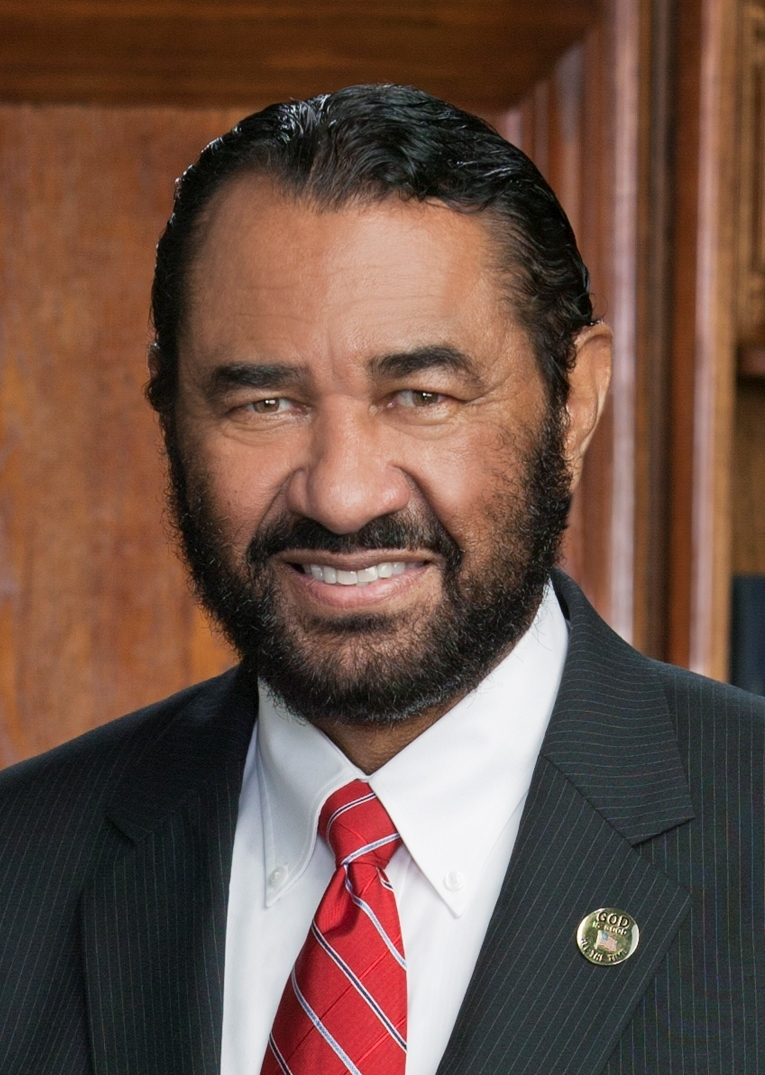
Nominee	Al Green
Party	Democratic
Popular vote	184,141
Percentage	100.0%
- Green: ≥90%
U.S. Representative before election
Al Green
Democratic
Elected U.S. Representative
Al Green
Democratic

The 9th district encompasses the southern Houston suburbs such as Missouri City. The incumbent was Democrat Al Green, who was re-elected with 76.68% of the vote in 2022.

=== Democratic primary ===
==== Nominee ====
- Al Green, incumbent U.S. representative

==== Endorsements ====
Al Green

Organizations

- Humane Society Legislative Fund
- J Street PAC
- Texas Medical Association PAC

Labor unions

- Texas AFL-CIO
- Texas American Federation of Teachers
- United Auto Workers

==== Fundraising ====
Campaign finance reports as of February 14, 2024
Candidate	Raised	Spent	Cash on hand
Al Green (D)	$147,160	$215,265	$198,289
Source: Federal Election Commission

==== Results ====
Democratic primary results
Party	Candidate	Votes	%
Democratic	Al Green (incumbent)	42,191	100.0
Total votes		42,191	100.0

=== General election ===
==== Predictions ====
Source	Ranking	As of
The Cook Political Report	Solid D	February 2, 2023
Inside Elections	Solid D	November 13, 2023
Sabato's Crystal Ball	Safe D	February 23, 2023
Elections Daily	Safe D	September 7, 2023
CNalysis	Solid D	November 16, 2023
Decision Desk HQ	Safe D	June 14, 2024

==== Results ====
2024 Texas's 9th congressional district election
Party	Candidate	Votes	%
Democratic	Al Green (incumbent)	184,141	100.00%
Democratic hold			

===== By county =====
County	Al Green Democratic
County	Votes
Brazoria	30,075
Fort Bend	45,593
Harris	108,473
Totals	184,141

== District 10 ==
2024 Texas's 10th congressional district election
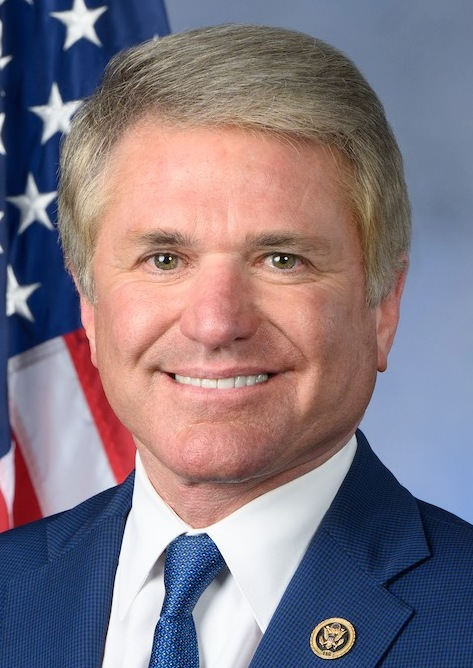

Nominee	Michael McCaul	Theresa Boisseau
Party	Republican	Democratic
Popular vote	220,908	117,937
Percentage	65.2%	34.8%
- McCaul: 40–50% 50–60% 60–70% 70–80% 80–90% >90% Boisseau: 50–60% 60–70% 70–80% >90% Tie: 50% No votes
U.S. Representative before election
Michael McCaul
Republican
Elected U.S. Representative
Michael McCaul
Republican

The incumbent was Republican Michael McCaul, who was re-elected with 63.30% of the vote in 2022.

=== Republican primary ===
==== Nominee ====
- Michael McCaul, incumbent U.S. representative

==== Eliminated in primary ====
- Jared Lovelace, businessman

==== Endorsements ====
Michael McCaul

Organizations

- AIPAC
- National Rifle Association Political Victory Fund
- Pro-Israel America
- Republican Jewish Coalition
- Texas Alliance for Life
- Texas Medical Association PAC

==== Fundraising ====
Campaign finance reports as of February 14, 2024
Candidate	Raised	Spent	Cash on hand
Jared Lovelace (R)	$53,887 (Note: $22,006 of this total was self-funded by Lovelace)	$52,533	$1,353
Michael McCaul (R)	$2,233,539	$1,962,425	$531,871
Source: Federal Election Commission

==== Results ====
Republican primary results
Party	Candidate	Votes	%
Republican	Michael McCaul (incumbent)	59,998	72.1
Republican	Jared Lovelace	23,175	27.9
Total votes		83,173	100.0

=== Democratic primary ===
==== Nominee ====
- Theresa Boisseau, real estate broker and former teacher

==== Eliminated in primary ====
- Keith McPhail, advertising account executive

==== Endorsements ====
Theresa Boisseau

Organizations

- National Women's Political Caucus
- Texas A&M University Aggie Democrats

Newspapers

- The Austin Chronicle
Keith McPhail

Labor unions

- Texas AFL-CIO
- United Auto Workers

==== Fundraising ====
Campaign finance reports as of February 14, 2024
Candidate	Raised	Spent	Cash on hand
Theresa Boisseau (D)	$33,605 (Note: $20,020 of this total was self-funded by Boisseau)	$22,914	$10,690
Keith McPhail (D)	$375	$7,985	$0
Source: Federal Election Commission

==== Results ====
Democratic primary results
Party	Candidate	Votes	%
Democratic	Theresa Boisseau	14,702	72.2
Democratic	Keith McPhail	5,661	27.8
Total votes		20,363	100.0

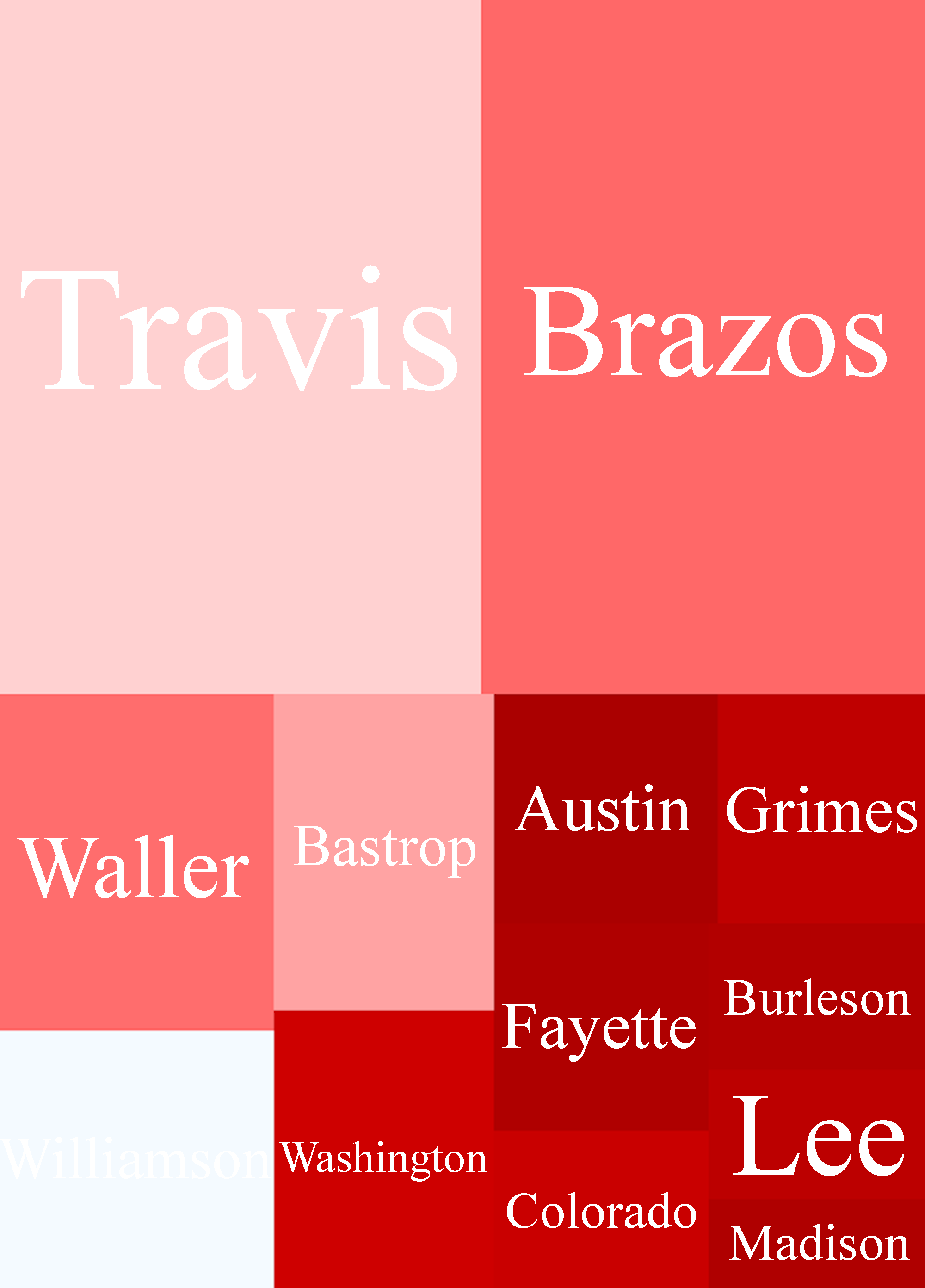
Cartogram of Texas' 10th congressional district

=== General election ===
==== Predictions ====
Source	Ranking	As of
The Cook Political Report	Solid R	February 2, 2023
Inside Elections	Solid R	March 10, 2023
Sabato's Crystal Ball	Safe R	February 23, 2023
Elections Daily	Safe R	September 7, 2023
CNalysis	Solid R	November 16, 2023
Decision Desk HQ	Safe R	June 14, 2024

==== Results ====
2024 Texas's 10th congressional district election
Party	Candidate	Votes	%
Republican	Michael McCaul (incumbent)	220,908	65.2
Democratic	Theresa Boisseau	117,937	34.8
Total votes		338,845	100.0
Republican hold			

==== By county ====
County	Michael McCaul Republican		Theresa Boisseau Democratic		Various candidates Other parties		Margin		Total votes cast
County	#	%	#	%	#	%	#	%	Total votes cast
Austin	12,377	82.40%	2,365	15.75%	278	1.85%	10,012	66.66%	15,020
Bastrop	11,760	57.73%	8,054	39.53%	558	2.74%	3,706	18.19%	20,372
Brazos	57,190	63.31%	30,413	33.67%	2,728	3.02%	26,777	29.64%	90,331
Burleson	7,502	81.53%	1,528	16.61%	171	1.86%	5,974	64.93%	9,201
Colorado	7,744	79.63%	1,837	18.89%	144	1.48%	5,907	60.74%	9,725
Fayette	10,689	81.86%	2,156	16.51%	212	1.62%	8,533	65.35%	13,057
Grimes	11,037	80.18%	2,445	17.76%	283	2.06%	8,592	62.42%	13,765
Lee	6,599	80.50%	1,442	17.59%	157	1.92%	5,157	62.91%	8,198
Madison	4,398	81.87%	890	16.57%	84	1.56%	3,508	65.30%	5,372
Travis	51,819	53.30%	43,195	44.43%	2,198	2.26%	8,624	8.87%	97,212
Waller	17,039	63.16%	9,346	34.64%	594	2.20%	7,693	28.51%	26,979
Washington	14,115	78.78%	3,466	19.35%	335	1.87%	10,649	59.44%	17,916
Williamson	8,960	43.35%	11,143	53.91%	567	2.74%	−2,183	−10.56%	20,670
Totals	221,229	63.60%	118,280	34.01%	8,309	2.39%	102,949	29.60%	347,818

== District 11 ==
2024 Texas's 11th congressional district election
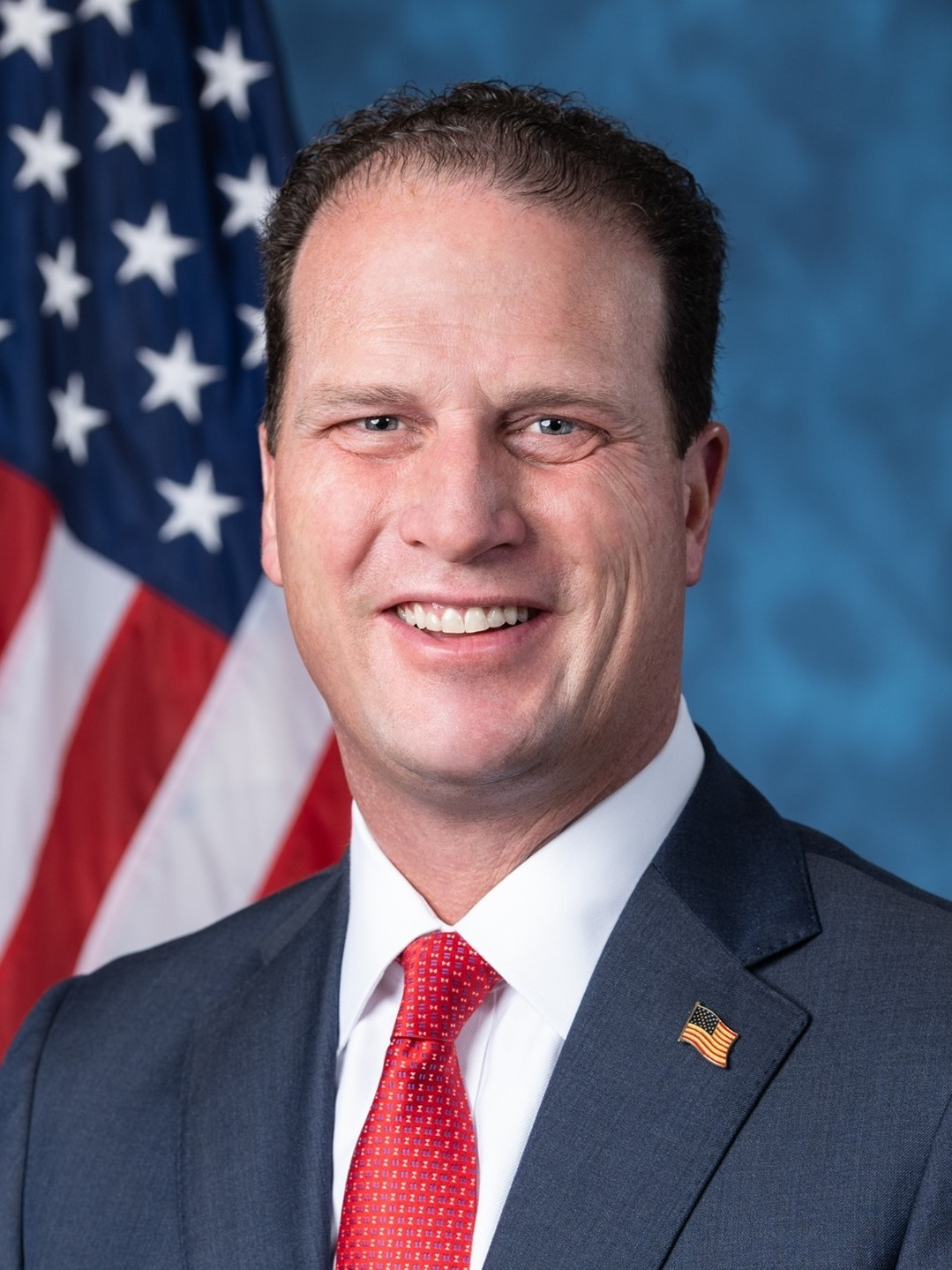
Nominee	August Pfluger
Party	Republican
Popular vote	211,975
Percentage	100.0%
- County results Pfluger: 100%
U.S. Representative before election
August Pfluger
Republican
Elected U.S. Representative
August Pfluger
Republican

The incumbent was Republican August Pfluger, who was re-elected unopposed in 2022.

=== Republican primary ===
==== Nominee ====
- August Pfluger, incumbent U.S. representative

==== Endorsements ====
August Pfluger

Executive branch officials

- Donald Trump, 45th president of the United States

Organizations

- AIPAC
- National Rifle Association Political Victory Fund
- Pro-Israel America (post-primary)
- Republican Jewish Coalition
- Texas Alliance for Life
- Texas Medical Association PAC

==== Fundraising ====
Campaign finance reports as of February 14, 2024
Candidate	Raised	Spent	Cash on hand
Austin Pfluger (R)	$2,005,728	$1,202,693	$2,379,398
Source: Federal Election Commission

==== Results ====
Republican primary results
Party	Candidate	Votes	%
Republican	August Pfluger (incumbent)	67,637	100.0
Total votes		67,637	100.0

=== General election ===
==== Predictions ====
Source	Ranking	As of
The Cook Political Report	Solid R	February 2, 2023
Inside Elections	Solid R	March 10, 2023
Sabato's Crystal Ball	Safe R	February 23, 2023
Elections Daily	Safe R	September 7, 2023
CNalysis	Solid R	November 16, 2023
Decision Desk HQ	Safe R	June 14, 2024

==== Results ====
2024 Texas's 11th congressional district election
Party	Candidate	Votes	%
Republican	August Pfluger (incumbent)	211,975	100.00%
Republican hold			

==== By county ====
County	August Pfluger Republican
County	Votes
Bell	28,837
Brown	15,047
Coke	1,673
Coleman	3,550
Concho	1,093
Ector	36,142
Glasscock	621
Irion	770
Kimble	2,161
Lampasas	9,045
Llano	11,550
Mason	2,061
McCulloch	3,090
Menard	917
Midland	48,575
Mills	2,403
Runnels	3,691
San Saba	2,315
Sterling	572
Tom Green	37,862
Totals	211,975

== District 12 ==
2024 Texas's 12th congressional district election
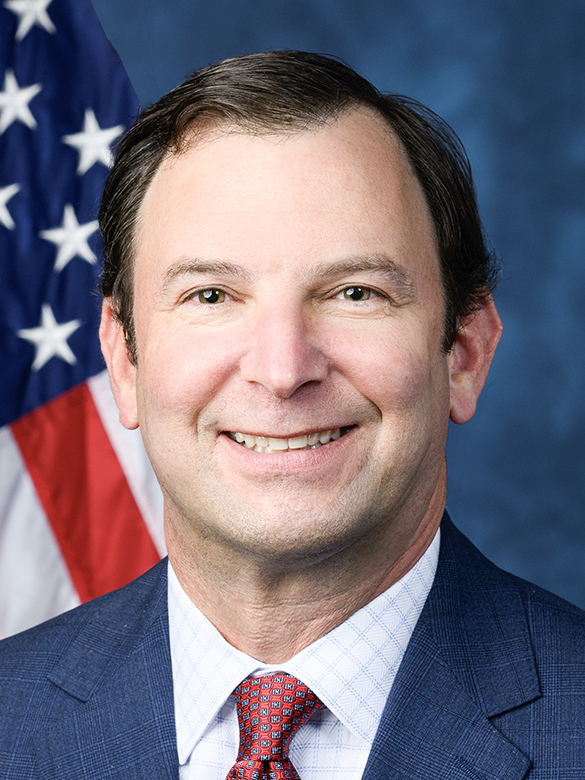

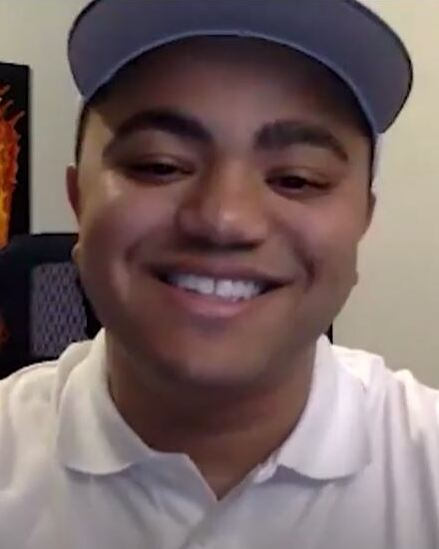
Nominee	Craig Goldman	Trey Hunt
Party	Republican	Democratic
Popular vote	215,112	123,666
Percentage	63.5%	36.5%
- Goldman: 50–60% 60–70% 70–80% 80–90% >90% Hunt: 50–60% 60–70% 70–80% 80–90% >90% Tie: 50% No votes
U.S. Representative before election
Kay Granger
Republican
Elected U.S. Representative
Craig Goldman
Republican

The 12th district is in the Dallas–Fort Worth metroplex. It takes in Parker County and western Tarrant County, including parts of Fort Worth and its inner suburbs of North Richland Hills, Saginaw, and Haltom City. The incumbent was Republican Kay Granger, who was re-elected with 64.27% of the vote in 2022.

=== Republican primary ===
==== Nominee ====
- Craig Goldman, majority leader of the Texas House of Representatives (2023–present) from the 97th district (2013–present)

==== Eliminated in runoff ====
- John O'Shea, construction company owner

==== Eliminated in primary ====
- Clint Dorris, project manager
- Shellie Gardner, electrical engineer
- Anne Henley, retiree

==== Withdrawn ====
- Kay Granger, incumbent U.S. representative

==== Declined ====
- Tim O'Hare, Tarrant County judge (Note: The position of County Judge is equivalent to a county executive. Despite the name, it is not a judicial position.)
- Mattie Parker, mayor of Fort Worth (2021–present) (endorsed Goldman)
- Manny Ramirez, Tarrant County commissioner (endorsed Goldman)
- Nate Schatzline, state representative from the 93rd district (2023–present) (ran for re-election)

==== Endorsements ====
Craig Goldman

Statewide officials

- Greg Abbott, governor of Texas

State legislators

- Giovanni Capriglione, state representative
- David Cook, state representative
- Charlie Geren, state representative
- Kelly Hancock, state senator
- Phil King, state senator
- Stephanie Klick, state representative
- Matt Krause, former state representative
- Tan Parker, state senator
- Drew Springer, state senator

Local officials

- Mattie Parker, mayor of Fort Worth
- Manny Ramirez, Tarrant County commissioner

Organizations

- AIPAC
- GOPAC
- National Rifle Association Political Victory Fund
- Republican Main Street Partnership PAC
- Susan B. Anthony Pro-Life America

Newspapers

- The Dallas Morning News (Republican primary only)
- Fort Worth Star-Telegram
John O'Shea

Statewide officials

- Ken Paxton, Texas attorney general

==== Fundraising ====
Campaign finance reports as of February 14, 2024
Candidate	Raised	Spent	Cash on hand
Craig Goldman (R)	$1,459,146	$705,435	$753,711
John O'Shea (R)	$266,793	$236,200	$30,592
Shellie Gardner (R)	$270,619 (Note: $255,000 of this total was self-funded by Gardner)	$244,540	$26,079
Clint Dorris (R)	$78,215	$38,466	$39,748
Source: Federal Election Commission

==== Results ====
Republican primary results
Party	Candidate	Votes	%
Republican	Craig Goldman	31,568	44.4
Republican	John O'Shea	18,757	26.4
Republican	Clint Dorris	10,591	14.9
Republican	Shellie Gardner	5,373	7.6
Republican	Anne Henley	4,849	6.8
Total votes		71,138	100.0

==== Primary runoff results ====
Republican primary results
Party	Candidate	Votes	%
Republican	Craig Goldman	16,787	62.9
Republican	John O'Shea	9,903	37.1
Total votes		26,690	100.0

=== Democratic primary ===
==== Nominee ====
- Trey Hunt, social worker and nominee for this district in 2022

==== Eliminated in primary ====
- Sebastian Gehrig, businessman

==== Endorsements ====
Sebastian Gehrig

Newspapers

- The Dallas Morning News (Democratic primary only)
- Fort Worth Star-Telegram

==== Fundraising ====
Campaign finance reports as of February 14, 2024
Candidate	Raised	Spent	Cash on hand
Trey Hunt (D)	$5,319	$3,732	$2,285
Source: Federal Election Commission

==== Results ====
Democratic primary results
Party	Candidate	Votes	%
Democratic	Trey Hunt	11,935	58.0
Democratic	Sebastian Gehrig	8,638	42.0
Total votes		20,573	100.0

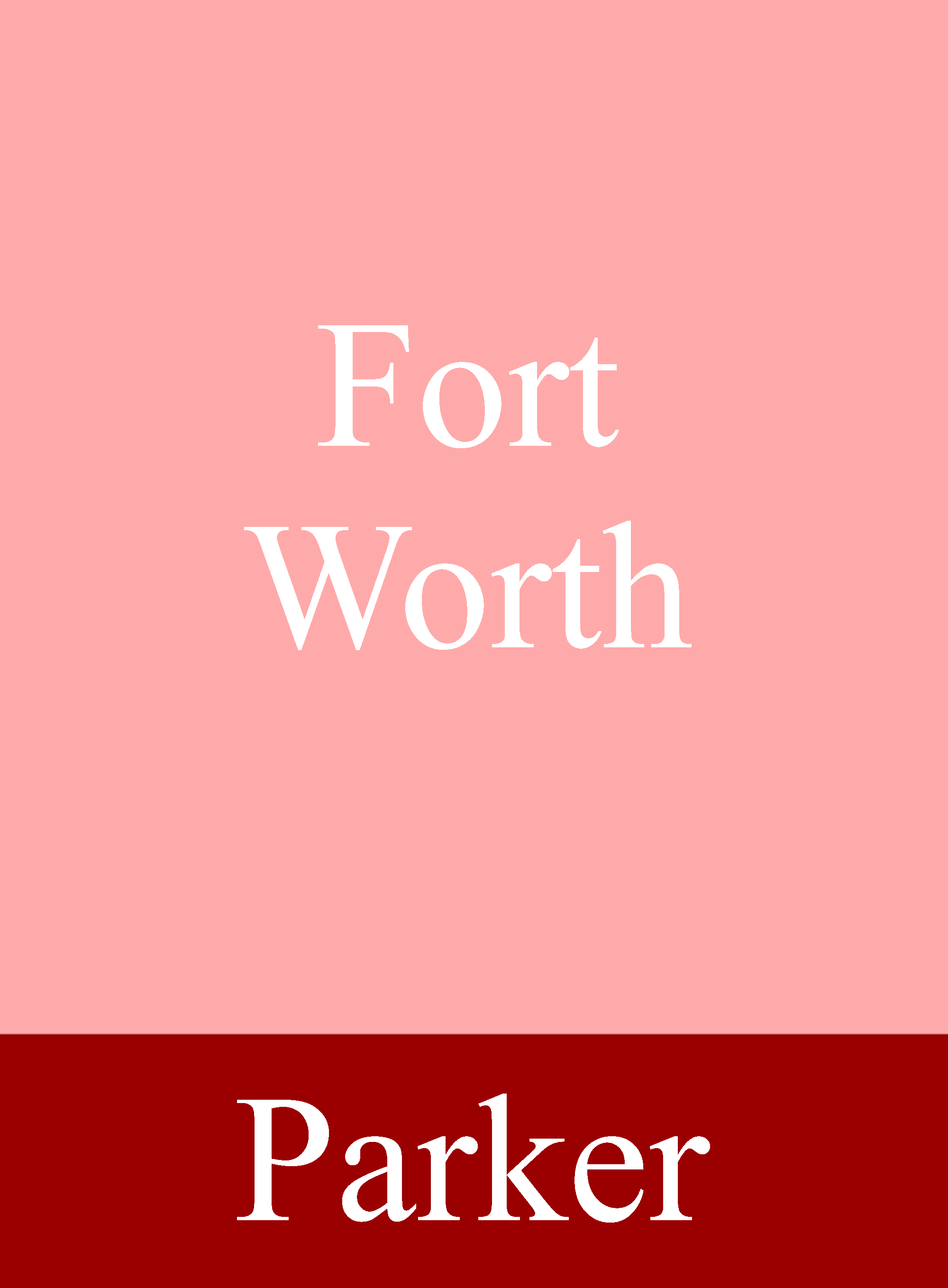
Cartogram of Texas' 12th congressional district

=== General election ===
==== Predictions ====
Source	Ranking	As of
The Cook Political Report	Solid R	February 2, 2023
Inside Elections	Solid R	March 10, 2023
Sabato's Crystal Ball	Safe R	February 23, 2023
Elections Daily	Safe R	September 7, 2023
CNalysis	Solid R	November 16, 2023
Decision Desk HQ	Safe R	June 14, 2024

==== Endorsements ====
Craig Goldman

Newspapers

- The Dallas Morning News

==== Results ====
2024 Texas's 12th congressional district election
Party	Candidate	Votes	%
Republican	Craig Goldman	215,112	63.5
Democratic	Trey Hunt	123,666	36.5
Total votes		338,778	100.0

==== By county ====
County	Craig Goldman Republican		Trey Hunt Democratic		Margin		Total votes cast
County	#	%	#	%	#	%	Total votes cast
Parker	56,991	84.78%	10,230	15.22%	46,761	69.56%	67,221
Tarrant	158,573	58.19%	113,924	41.81%	44,649	16.39%	272,497
Totals	215,564	63.45%	124,154	36.55%	91,410	26.91%	339,718

== District 13 ==
2024 Texas's 13th congressional district election
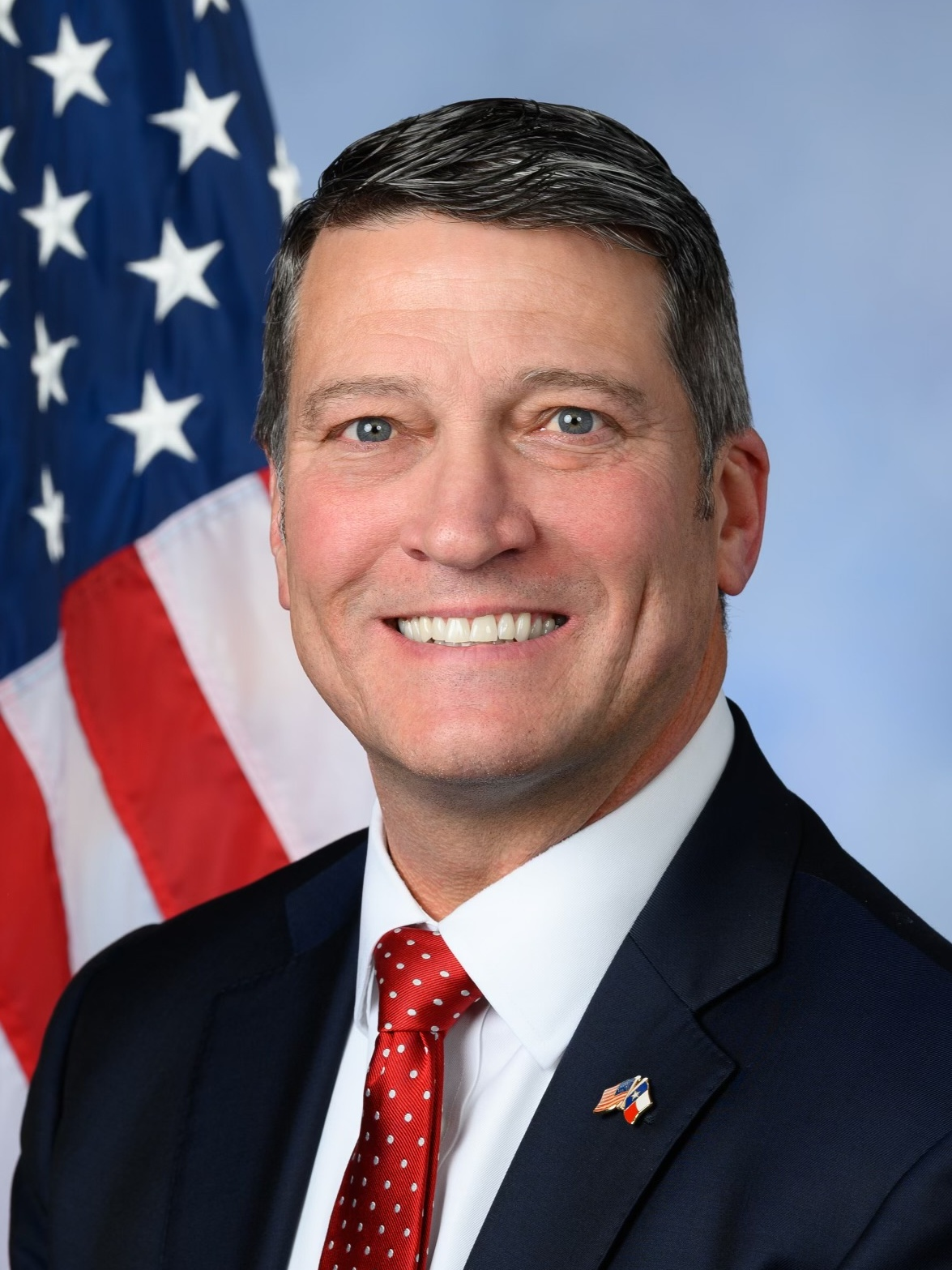
Nominee	Ronny Jackson
Party	Republican
Popular vote	240,622
Percentage	100.0%
- County results Jackson: ≥90%
U.S. Representative before election
Ronny Jackson
Republican
Elected U.S. Representative
Ronny Jackson
Republican

The incumbent was Republican Ronny Jackson, who was re-elected with 75.35% of the vote in 2022.

=== Republican primary ===
==== Nominee ====
- Ronny Jackson, incumbent U.S. representative

==== Endorsements ====
Ronny Jackson

Executive branch officials

- Donald Trump, 45th president of the United States

Organizations

- AIPAC
- National Rifle Association Political Victory Fund
- National Right to Life Committee
- Pro-Israel America (post-primary)
- Texas Alliance for Life
- Texas Medical Association PAC

==== Fundraising ====
Campaign finance reports as of February 14, 2024
Candidate	Raised	Spent	Cash on hand
Ronny Jackson (R)	$3,978,774	$2,467,508	$2,178,540
Source: Federal Election Commission

==== Results ====
Republican primary results
Party	Candidate	Votes	%
Republican	Ronny Jackson (incumbent)	81,844	100.0
Total votes		81,844	100.0

=== General election ===
==== Predictions ====
Source	Ranking	As of
The Cook Political Report	Solid R	February 2, 2023
Inside Elections	Solid R	March 10, 2023
Sabato's Crystal Ball	Safe R	February 23, 2023
Elections Daily	Safe R	September 7, 2023
CNalysis	Solid R	November 16, 2023
Decision Desk HQ	Safe R	June 14, 2024

==== Results ====
2024 Texas's 13th congressional district election
Party	Candidate	Votes	%
Republican	Ronny Jackson (incumbent)	240,622	100.00%
Republican hold			

==== By county ====
County	Ronny Jackson Republican
County	Votes
Archer	4,717
Armstrong	1,008
Baylor	1,431
Briscoe	650
Carson	2,704
Childress	1,955
Clay	5,186
Collingsworth	1,032
Cottle	543
Dallam	1,244
Deaf Smith	3,545
Denton	35,688
Dickens	843
Donley	1,455
Foard	438
Gray	6,905
Hall	951
Hansford	1,779
Hardeman	1,209
Hartley	1,858
Hemphill	1,399
Hutchinson	7,158
King	122
Knox	1,115
Lipscomb	1,163
Montague	9,598
Moore	4,460
Motley	605
Ochiltree	2,739
Oldham	888
Potter	25,611
Randall	57,810
Roberts	550
Sherman	782
Wheeler	2,076
Wichita	35,007
Wilbarger	3,721
Wise	10,677
Totals	240,622

== District 14 ==
2024 Texas's 14th congressional district election
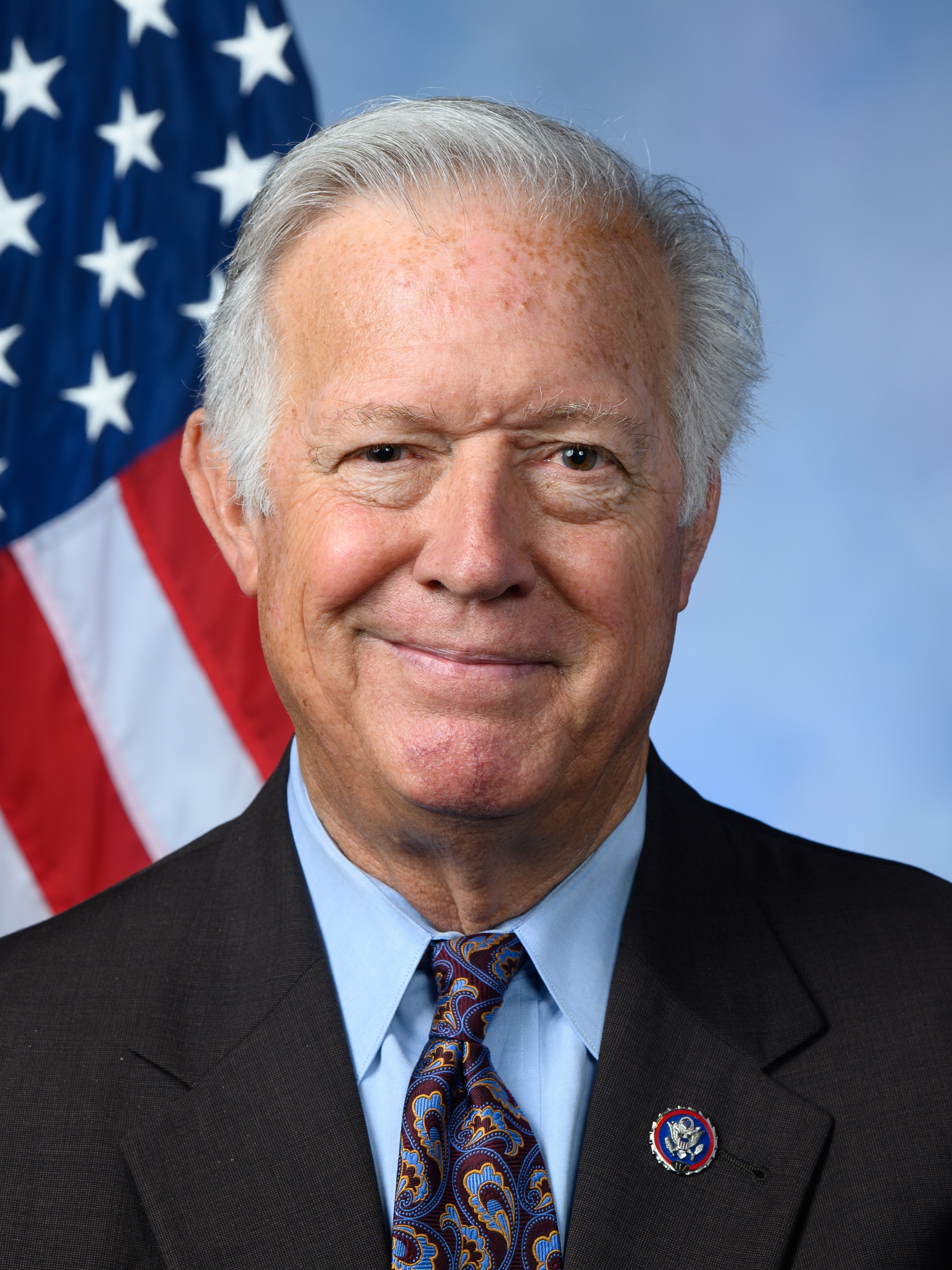

Nominee	Randy Weber	Rhonda Hart
Party	Republican	Democratic
Popular vote	209,939	95,487
Percentage	68.7%	31.3%
- Weber: 50–60% 60–70% 70–80% 80–90% >90% Hart: 50–60% 60–70% 70–80% 80–90% >90% Tie: 50% No votes
U.S. Representative before election
Randy Weber
Republican
Elected U.S. Representative
Randy Weber
Republican

The 14th district encompasses the southern and southeastern regions of Greater Houston, including Galveston, Jefferson County, and southern Brazoria County. The incumbent was Republican Randy Weber, who was re-elected with 68.55% of the vote in 2022.

=== Republican primary ===
==== Nominee ====
- Randy Weber, incumbent U.S. representative

==== Endorsements ====
Randy Weber

Executive branch officials

- Donald Trump, 45th president of the United States

Organizations

- AIPAC
- National Rifle Association Political Victory Fund
- National Right to Life Committee
- Texas Alliance for Life
- Texas Medical Association PAC

==== Fundraising ====
Campaign finance reports as of February 14, 2024
Candidate	Raised	Spent	Cash on hand
Randy Weber (R)	$712,206	$609,841	$544,260
Source: Federal Election Commission

==== Results ====
Republican primary results
Party	Candidate	Votes	%
Republican	Randy Weber (incumbent)	69,321	100.0
Total votes		69,321	100.0

=== Democratic primary ===
==== Nominee ====
- Rhonda Hart, homemaker

==== Endorsements ====
Rhonda Hart

Organizations

- Brady PAC
- Everytown for Gun Safety

Labor unions

- Texas AFL-CIO
- United Auto Workers

==== Fundraising ====
Campaign finance reports as of February 14, 2024
Candidate	Raised	Spent	Cash on hand
Rhonda Hart (D)	$13,722	$5,139	$8,582
Source: Federal Election Commission

==== Results ====
Democratic primary results
Party	Candidate	Votes	%
Democratic	Rhonda Hart	15,357	100.0
Total votes		15,357	100.0

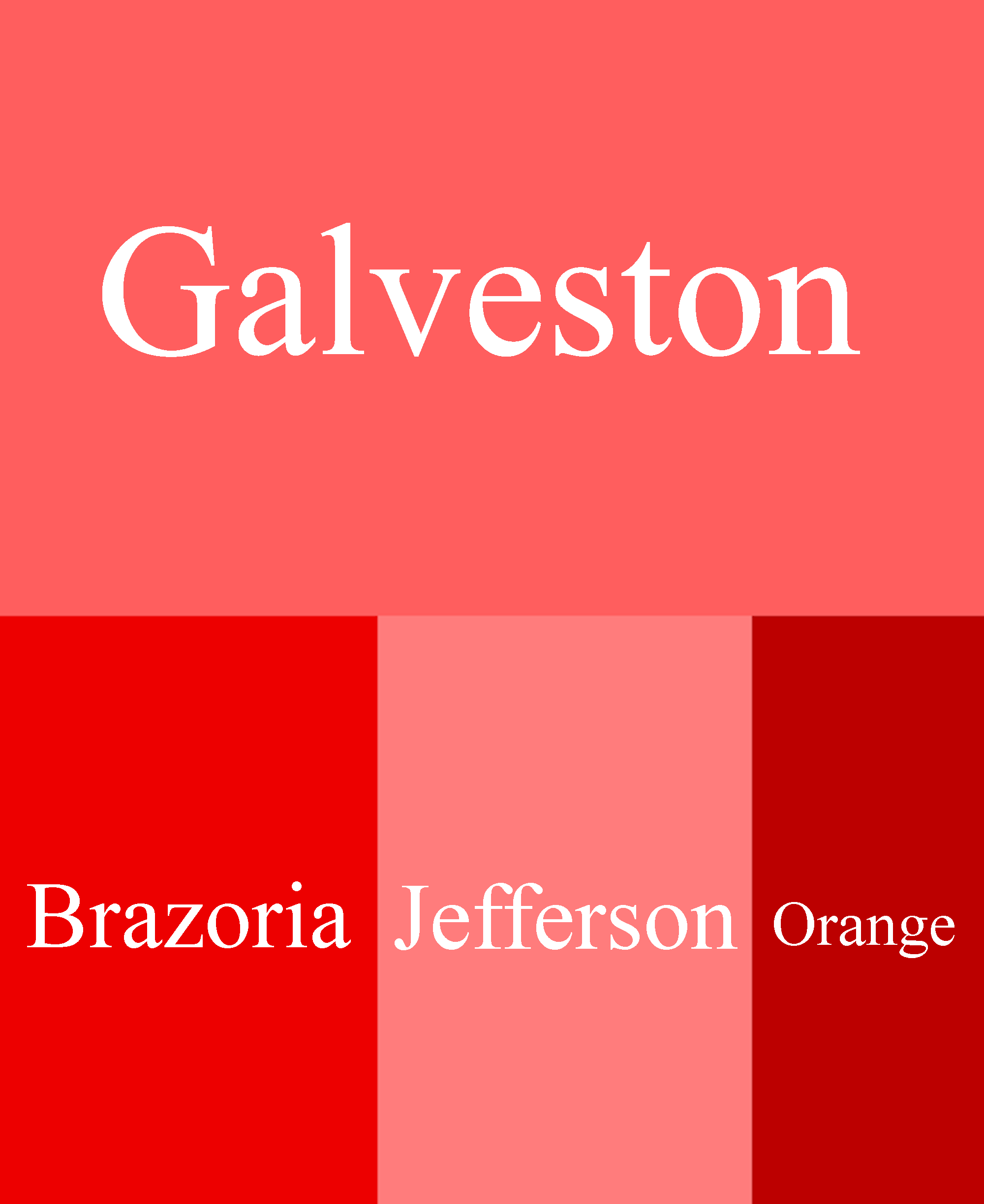
Cartogram of Texas' 14th congressional district

=== General election ===
==== Predictions ====
Source	Ranking	As of
The Cook Political Report	Solid R	February 2, 2023
Inside Elections	Solid R	March 10, 2023
Sabato's Crystal Ball	Safe R	February 23, 2023
Elections Daily	Safe R	September 7, 2023
CNalysis	Solid R	November 16, 2023
Decision Desk HQ	Safe R	June 14, 2024

==== Results ====
2024 Texas's 14th congressional district election
Party	Candidate	Votes	%
Republican	Randy Weber (incumbent)	210,320	68.69
Democratic	Rhonda Hart	95,875	31.31
Total votes		306,195	100.00
Republican hold			

==== By county ====
County	Randy Weber Republican		Rhonda Hart Democratic		Margin		Total
County	#	%	#	%	#	%	Total
Brazoria	44,092	76.74%	13,367	23.26%	30,725	53.47%	57,459
Galveston	103,123	65.81%	53,575	34.19%	49,548	31.62%	156,698
Jefferson	33,575	59.04%	23,295	40.96%	10,280	18.08%	56,870
Orange	29,530	83.97%	5,638	16.03%	23,892	67.94%	35,168
Totals	210,320	68.69%	95,875	31.31%	114,445	37.38%	306,195

== District 15 ==
2024 Texas's 15th congressional district election
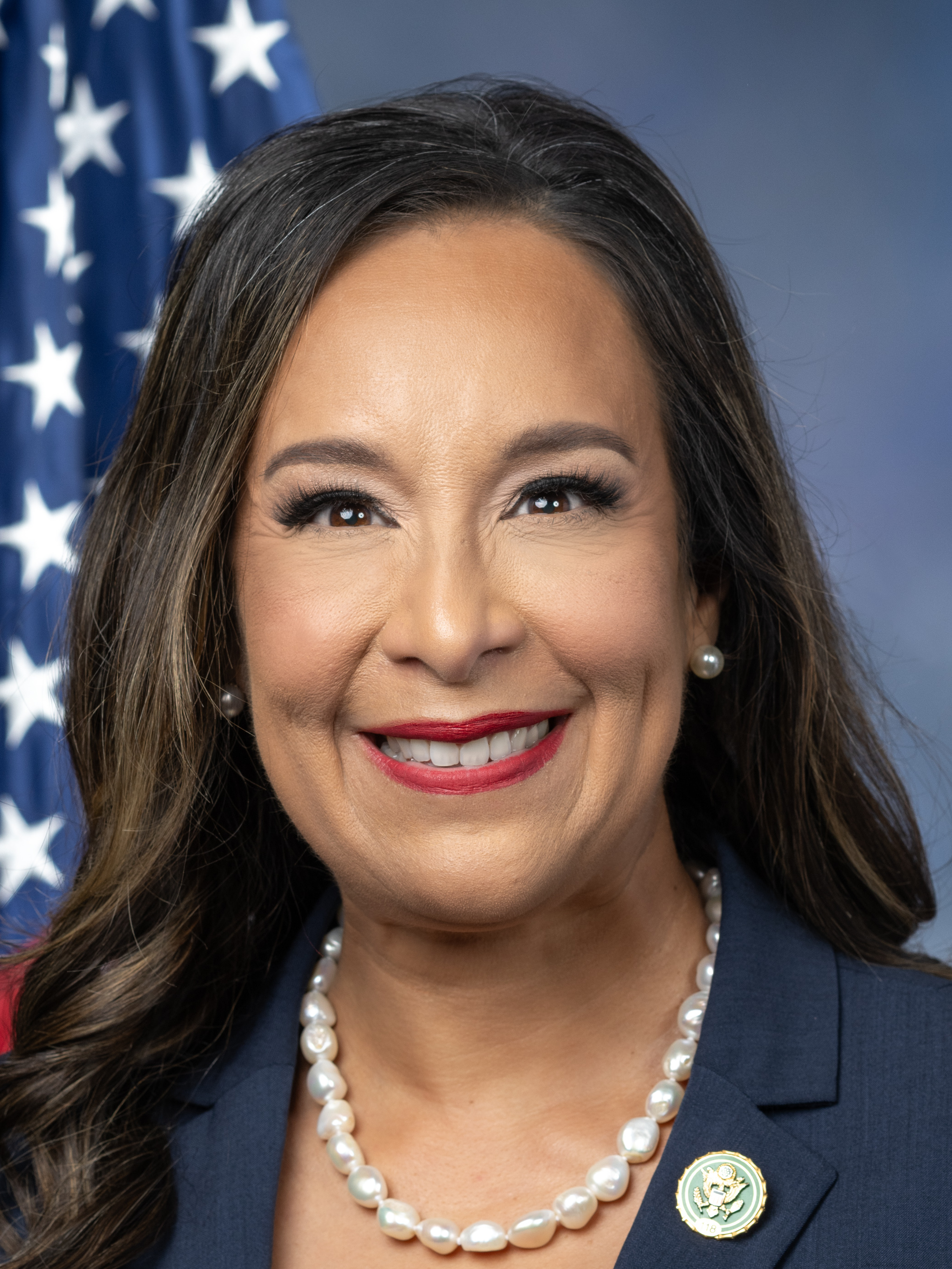

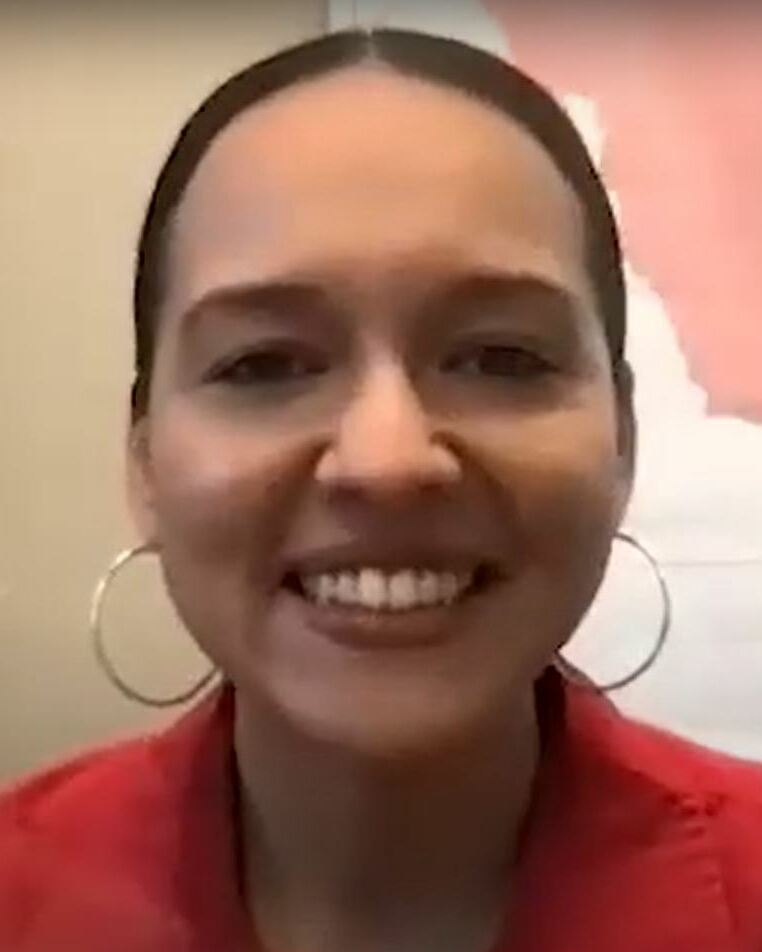
Nominee	Monica De La Cruz	Michelle Vallejo
Party	Republican	Democratic
Popular vote	127,620	95,758
Percentage	57.1%	42.9%
- De La Cruz: 50–60% 60–70% 70–80% 80–90% >90% Vallejo: 50–60% 60–70% 70–80% Tie: 50% No votes
U.S. Representative before election
Monica De La Cruz
Republican
Elected U.S. Representative
Monica De La Cruz
Republican

The 15th district stretches from western Hidalgo County in the Rio Grande Valley, northward into rural counties in the Greater San Antonio area. The incumbent was Republican Monica De La Cruz, who flipped the district and was elected with 53.31% of the vote in 2022.

=== Republican primary ===
==== Nominee ====
- Monica De La Cruz, incumbent U.S. representative

==== Eliminated in primary ====
- Vangela Churchill, high school assistant principal and candidate for this district in 2022

==== Endorsements ====
Monica De La Cruz

Executive branch officials

- Donald Trump, 45th president of the United States

Organizations

- AIPAC
- The LIBRE Initiative
- Maggie's List
- National Rifle Association Political Victory Fund
- Texas Alliance for Life
- Texas Medical Association PAC

==== Fundraising ====
Campaign finance reports as of February 14, 2024
Candidate	Raised	Spent	Cash on hand
Vangela Churchill (R)	$3,560	$1,614	$1,945
Monica De La Cruz (R)	$3,034,764	$1,661,839	$1,425,141
Source: Federal Election Commission

==== Results ====
Republican primary results
Party	Candidate	Votes	%
Republican	Monica De La Cruz (incumbent)	30,972	88.2
Republican	Vangela Churchill	4,140	11.8
Total votes		35,112	100.0

=== Democratic primary ===
==== Nominee ====
- Michelle Vallejo, flea market owner and nominee for this district in 2022

==== Eliminated in primary ====
- John Rigney, attorney and candidate for this district in 2022

==== Endorsements ====
Michelle Vallejo

U.S. representatives

- Colin Allred, U.S. representative from Texas's 32nd congressional district
- Joaquin Castro, U.S. representative from Texas's 20th congressional district
- Veronica Escobar, U.S. representative from Texas's 16th congressional district
- Lois Frankel, U.S. representative from Florida (2013-present)
- Sylvia Garcia, U.S. representative from Texas's 29th congressional district
- Gabby Giffords, U.S. representative from Arizona's 8th congressional district (2007–2012)
- Linda Sánchez, U.S. representative from California's 38th congressional district

State legislators

- Wendy Davis, former state senator (2009–2015)

Organizations

- CHC BOLD PAC
- DCCC Red to Blue
- Democratic Majority for Israel
- EMILY's List
- End Citizens United
- Everytown for Gun Safety (post-primary)
- Giffords
- Human Rights Campaign (post-primary)
- J Street PAC
- Jewish Democratic Council of America
- Latino Victory Fund
- League of Conservation Voters
- National Women's Political Caucus
- NewDem Action Fund (post-primary)
- Peace Action
- Planned Parenthood Action Fund
- PODER PAC
- Reproductive Freedom for All

Labor unions

- Communications Workers of America (post-primary)
- National Education Association
- Texas AFL-CIO
- Texas American Federation of Teachers
- United Auto Workers

==== Fundraising ====
Campaign finance reports as of February 14, 2024
Candidate	Raised	Spent	Cash on hand
John Rigney (D)	$12,357	$3,802	$8,555
Michelle Vallejo (D)	$593,979	$397,215	$208,481
Source: Federal Election Commission

==== Results ====
Democratic primary results
Party	Candidate	Votes	%
Democratic	Michelle Vallejo	21,456	74.7
Democratic	John Rigney	7,268	25.3
Total votes		28,724	100.0

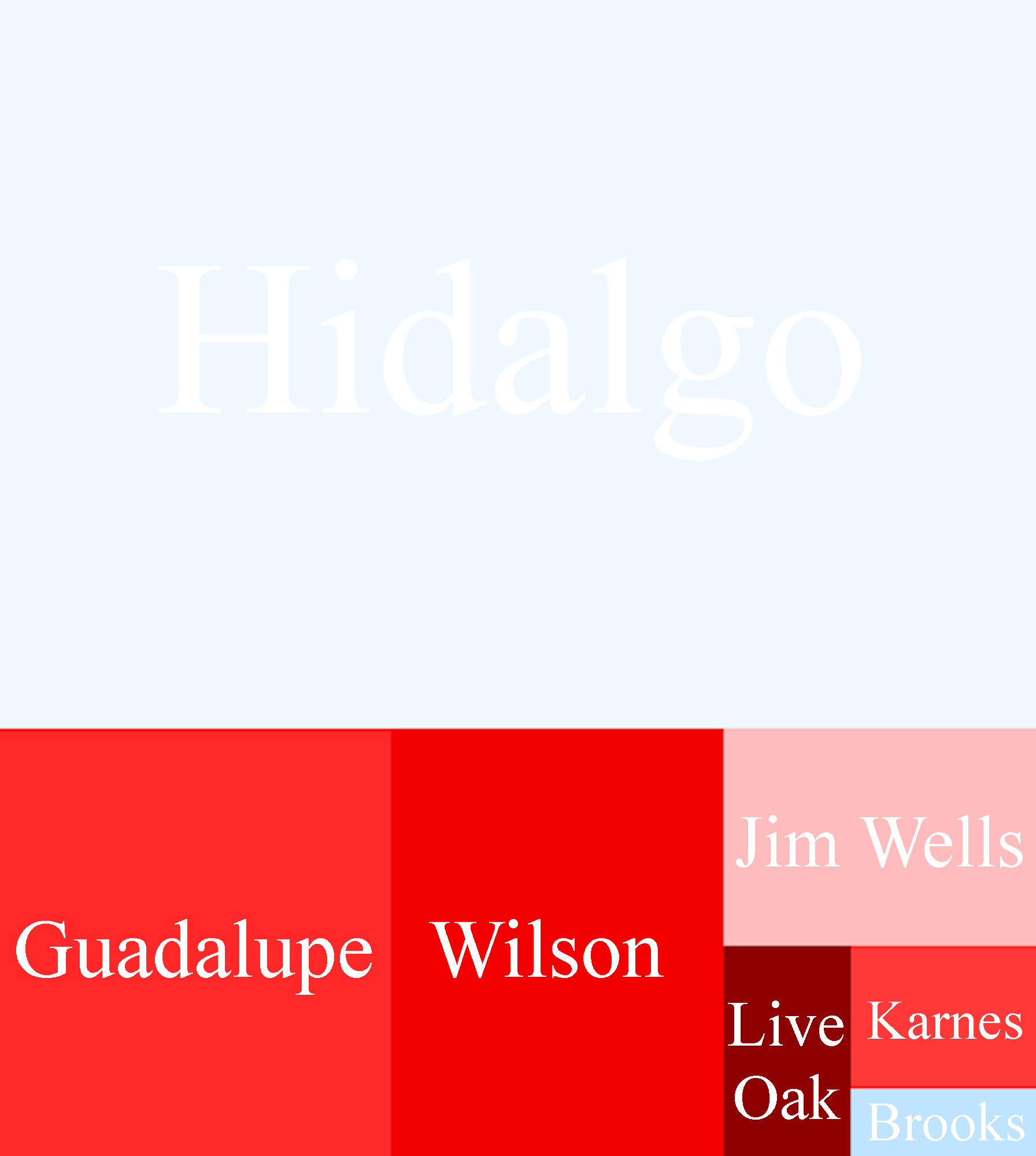
Cartogram of Texas' 15th congressional district

=== General election ===
==== Predictions ====
Source	Ranking	As of
The Cook Political Report	Likely R	February 2, 2023
Inside Elections	Likely R	September 12, 2024
Sabato's Crystal Ball	Likely R	February 23, 2023
Elections Daily	Likely R	September 7, 2023
CNalysis	Lean R	November 16, 2023
Decision Desk HQ	Likely R	June 14, 2024
*538*	Likely R	October 14, 2024

==== Polling ====
Poll source	Date(s) administered	Sample size	Margin of error	Monica De La Cruz (R)	Michelle Vallejo (D)	Undecided
GQR (D) (Note: Poll sponsored by House Majority PAC, which supports Democratic candidates)	September 18–23, 2024	400 (LV)	± 4.9%	48%	45%	8%

==== Results ====
2024 Texas's 15th congressional district election
Party	Candidate	Votes	%
Republican	Monica De La Cruz (incumbent)	127,804	57.11
Democratic	Michelle Vallejo	95,965	42.89
Total votes		223,769	100.00
Republican hold			

==== By county ====
County	Monica De La Cruz Republican		Michelle Vallejo Democratic		Margin		Total votes cast
County	#	%	#	%	#	%	Total votes cast
Brooks	982	43.22%	1,290	56.78%	−308	−13.56%	2,272
Guadalupe	22,168	71.11%	9,008	28.89%	13,160	42.21%	31,176
Hidalgo	68,443	48.57%	72,466	51.43%	−4,023	−2.86%	140,909
Jim Wells	7,192	56.57%	5,521	43.43%	1,671	13.14%	12,713
Karnes	3,945	79.55%	1,014	20.45%	2,931	59.10%	4,959
Live Oak	4,288	86.14%	690	13.86%	3,598	72.28%	4,978
Wilson	20,786	77.67%	5,976	22.33%	14,810	55.34%	26,762
Totals	127,804	57.11%	95,965	42.89%	31,839	14.23%	223,769

== District 16 ==
2024 Texas's 16th congressional district election
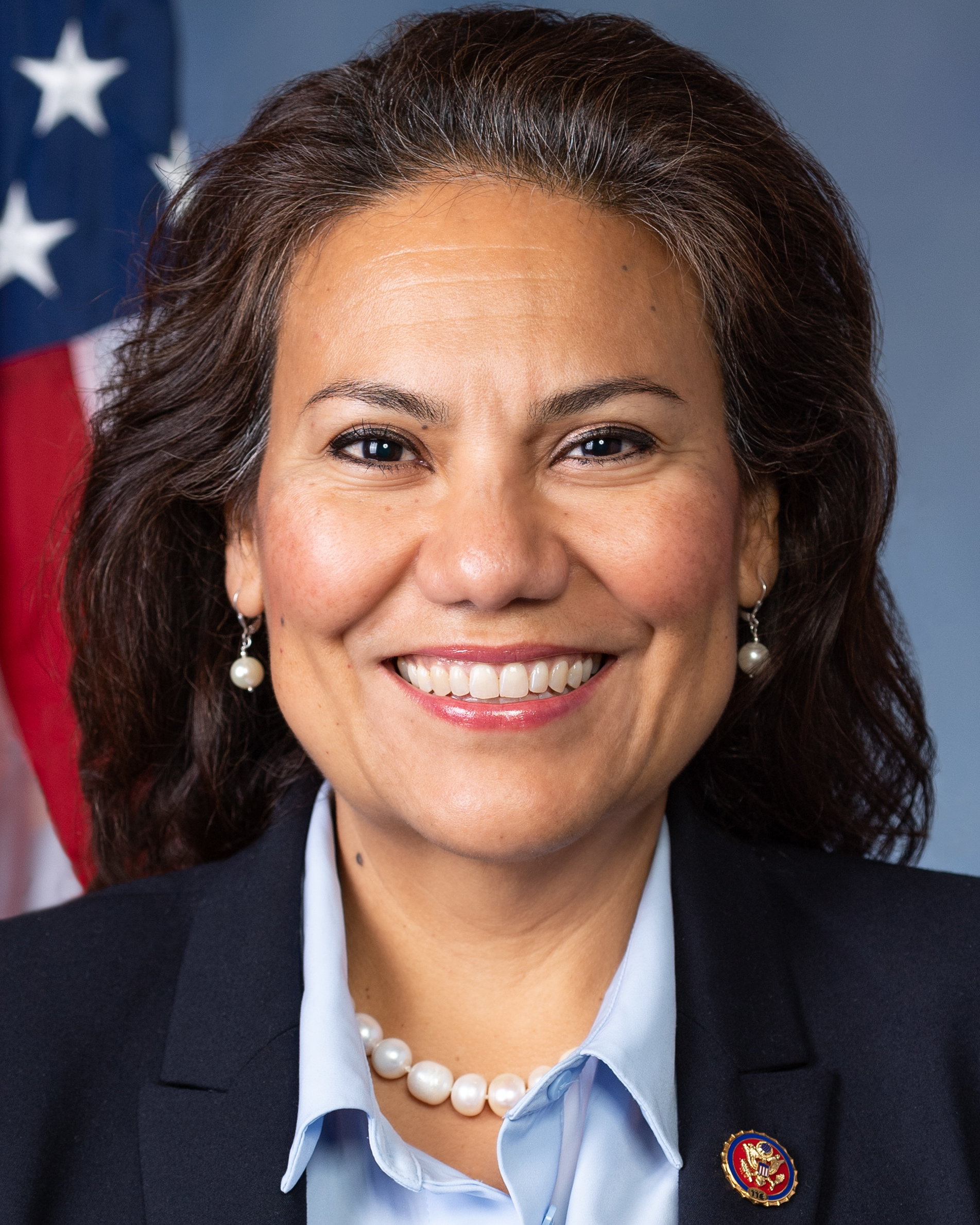

Nominee	Veronica Escobar	Irene Armendariz-Jackson
Party	Democratic	Republican
Popular vote	131,391	89,281
Percentage	59.5%	40.5%
- Escobar: 50–60% 60–70% 70–80% Armendariz-Jackson: 50–60% 80–90% Tie: 50% No votes
U.S. Representative before election
Veronica Escobar
Democratic
Elected U.S. Representative
Veronica Escobar
Democratic

The 16th district is entirely within El Paso County, taking in El Paso, Horizon City, and Anthony. The incumbent was Democrat Veronica Escobar, who was re-elected with 63.46% of the vote in 2022.

=== Democratic primary ===
==== Nominee ====
- Veronica Escobar, incumbent U.S. representative

==== Eliminated in primary ====
- Leeland White, civil servant

==== Endorsements ====
Veronica Escobar

Organizations

- Brady PAC
- Everytown for Gun Safety Action Fund
- Feminist Majority PAC
- Humane Society Legislative Fund
- J Street PAC
- League of Conservation Voters
- National Women's Political Caucus
- Natural Resources Defense Council
- Planned Parenthood Action Fund
- Texas Medical Association PAC
- Vote Common Good

Labor unions

- National Education Association
- Texas AFL-CIO
- Texas American Federation of Teachers
- United Auto Workers

==== Fundraising ====
Campaign finance reports as of February 14, 2024
Candidate	Raised	Spent	Cash on hand
Veronica Escobar (D)	$797,187	$655,869	$388,030
Source: Federal Election Commission

==== Results ====
Democratic primary results
Party	Candidate	Votes	%
Democratic	Veronica Escobar (incumbent)	28,129	86.3
Democratic	Leeland White	4,470	13.7
Total votes		32,599	100.0

=== Republican primary ===
==== Nominee ====
- Irene Armendariz-Jackson, realtor and nominee for this district in 2020 and 2022

==== Fundraising ====
Campaign finance reports as of February 14, 2024
Candidate	Raised	Spent	Cash on hand
Irene Armendariz-Jackson (R)	$23,270	$22,691	$1,326
Source: Federal Election Commission

==== Results ====
Republican primary results
Party	Candidate	Votes	%
Republican	Irene Armendariz-Jackson	15,553	100.0
Total votes		15,553	100.0

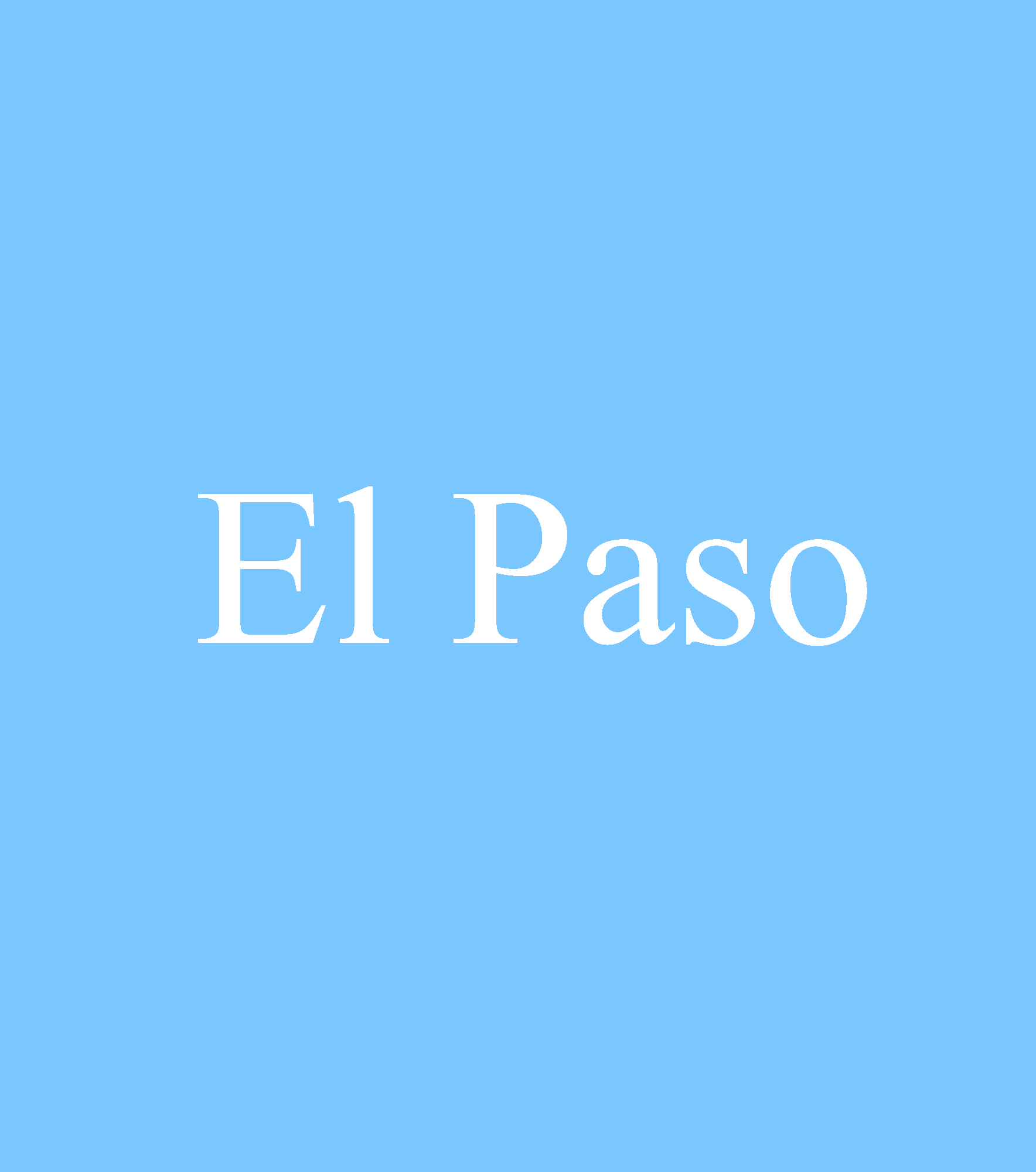
Cartogram of Texas' 16th congressional district

=== General election ===
==== Predictions ====
Source	Ranking	As of
The Cook Political Report	Solid D	February 2, 2023
Inside Elections	Solid D	March 10, 2023
Sabato's Crystal Ball	Safe D	February 23, 2023
Elections Daily	Safe D	September 7, 2023
CNalysis	Solid D	November 16, 2023
Decision Desk HQ	Safe D	June 14, 2024

==== Results ====
2024 Texas's 16th congressional district election
Party	Candidate	Votes	%
Democratic	Veronica Escobar (incumbent)	131,391	59.50%
Republican	Irene Armendariz-Jackson	89,281	40.43%
Write-in		156	0.07%
Total votes		220,828	100.00%
Democratic hold			

===== By county =====
County	Veronica Escobar Democratic		Irene Armendariz-Jackso Republican		Write-in		Margin		Total
County	#	%	#	%	#	%	#	%	Total
El Paso	131,391	59.50%	89,281	40.43%	156	0.07%	42,110	19.07%	220,828
Totals	131,391	59.50%	89,281	40.43%	156	0.07%	42,110	19.07%	220,828

== District 17 ==
2024 Texas's 17th congressional district election
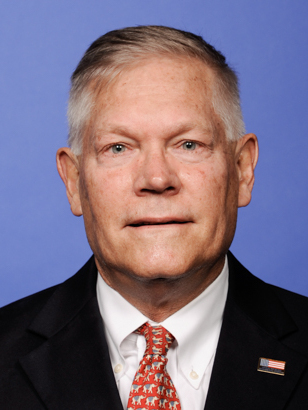

Nominee	Pete Sessions	Mark Lorenzen
Party	Republican	Democratic
Popular vote	192,834	97,711
Percentage	66.4%	33.6%
- Sessions: 50–60% 60–70% 70–80% 80–90% >90% Lorenzen: 50–60% 60–70% 70–80% 80–90% Tie: 50% No votes
U.S. Representative before election
Pete Sessions
Republican
Elected U.S. Representative
Pete Sessions
Republican

The incumbent was Republican Pete Sessions, who was re-elected with 66.48% of the vote in 2022.

=== Republican primary ===
==== Nominee ====
- Pete Sessions, incumbent U.S. representative

==== Eliminated in primary ====
- Joseph Langone, truck driver

==== Endorsements ====
Pete Sessions

Executive branch officials

- Donald Trump, 45th president of the United States

Organizations

- AIPAC
- National Rifle Association Political Victory Fund
- Texas Alliance for Life
- Texas Medical Association PAC

==== Fundraising ====
Campaign finance reports as of February 14, 2024
Candidate	Raised	Spent	Cash on hand
Pete Sessions (R)	$639,342	$265,920	$461,536
Source: Federal Election Commission

==== Results ====
Republican primary results
Party	Candidate	Votes	%
Republican	Pete Sessions (incumbent)	67,798	84.9
Republican	Joseph Langone	12,052	15.1
Total votes		79,850	100.0

=== Democratic primary ===
==== Nominee ====
- Mark Lorenzen, physician

==== Fundraising ====
Campaign finance reports as of February 14, 2024
Candidate	Raised	Spent	Cash on hand
Mark Lorenzen (D)	$7,930 (Note: $3,500 of this total was self-funded by Lorenzen)	$2,263	$5,666
Source: Federal Election Commission

==== Results ====
Democratic primary results
Party	Candidate	Votes	%
Democratic	Mark Lorenzen	13,925	100.0
Total votes		13,925	100.0

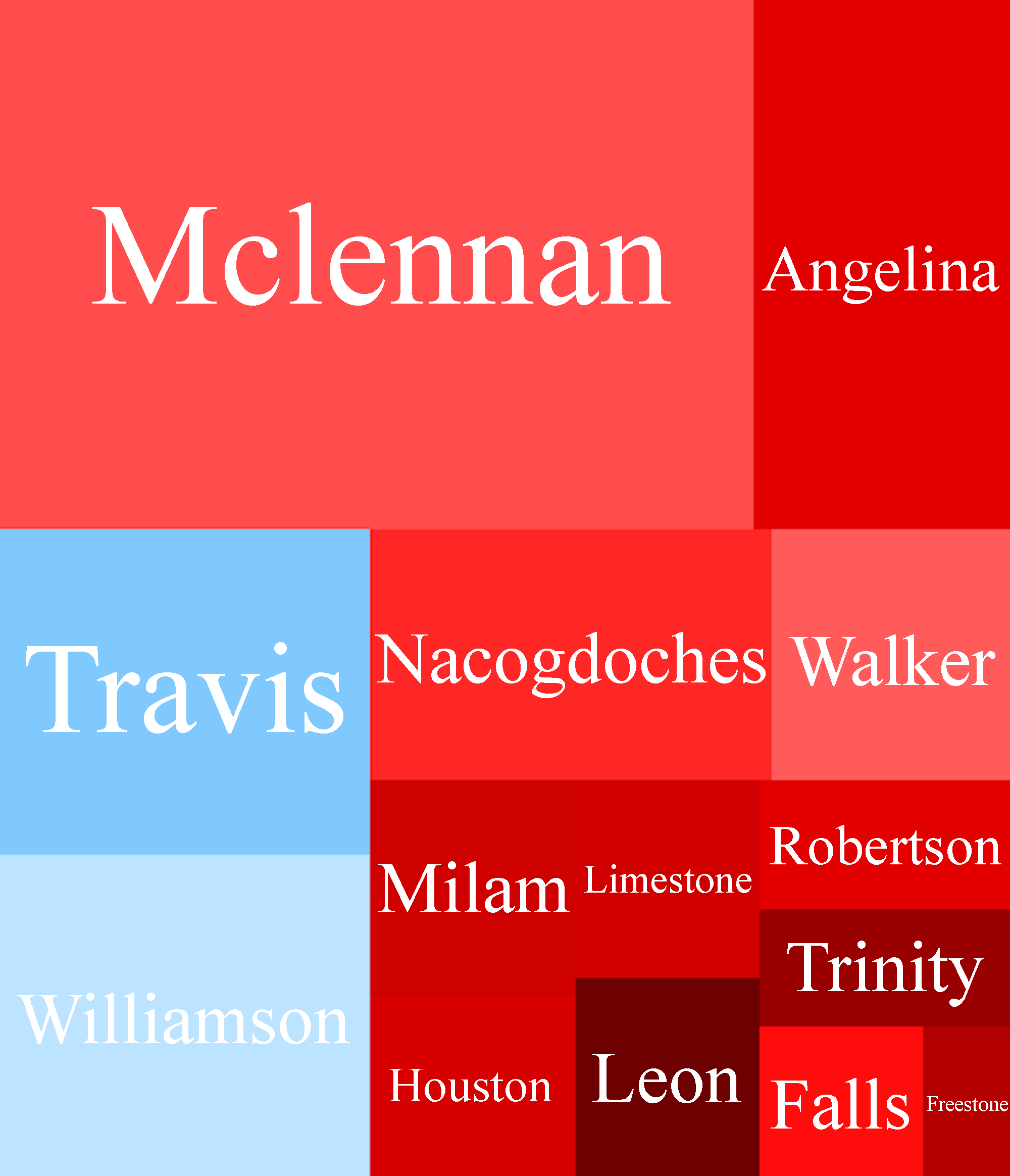
Cartogram of Texas' 17th congressional district

=== General election ===
==== Predictions ====
Source	Ranking	As of
The Cook Political Report	Solid R	February 2, 2023
Inside Elections	Solid R	March 10, 2023
Sabato's Crystal Ball	Safe R	February 23, 2023
Elections Daily	Safe R	September 7, 2023
CNalysis	Solid R	November 16, 2023
Decision Desk HQ	Safe R	June 14, 2024

==== Results ====
2024 Texas's 17th congressional district election
Party	Candidate	Votes	%
Republican	Pete Sessions (incumbent)	193,101	66.35
Democratic	Mark Lorenzen	97,941	33.65
Total votes		291,042	100.00
Republican hold			

==== By county ====
County	Pete Sessions Republican		Mark Lorenzen Democratic		Margin		Total votes cast
County	#	%	#	%	#	%	Total votes cast
Angelina	25,919	77.69%	7,441	22.30%	18,478	55.39%	33,360
Falls	4,553	73.71%	1,624	26.29%	2,929	47.43%	6,177
Freestone	2,736	82.63%	575	17.37%	2,161	65.27%	3,311
Houston	7,169	78.99%	1,907	21.01%	5,262	57.98%	9,076
Leon	7,900	89.30%	947	10.70%	6,953	78.59%	8,847
Limestone	7,048	79.57%	1,810	20.43%	5,238	59.13%	8,858
McLennan	65,892	67.49%	31,745	32.51%	34,147	34.97%	97,637
Milam	8,682	79.64%	2,220	20.36%	6,462	59.27%	10,902
Robertson	6,217	77.79%	1,775	22.21%	4,442	55.58%	7,992
Travis	10,968	37.47%	18,304	62.53%	−7,336	−25.06%	29,272
Trinity	6,084	84.90%	1,082	15.10%	5,002	69.80%	7,166
Walker	9,619	66.19%	4,913	33.81%	4,706	32.38%	14,532
Williamson	12,717	43.51%	16,512	56.49%	−3,795	−12.98%	29,229
Totals	193,101	66.35%	97,941	33.65%	95,160	32.70%	291,042

== District 18 ==
2024 Texas's 18th congressional district election
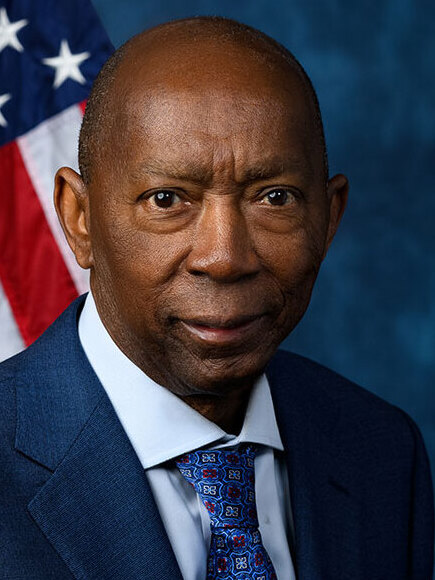

Nominee	Sylvester Turner (replacing Sheila Jackson Lee)	Lana Centonze
Party	Democratic	Republican
Popular vote	151,834	66,810
Percentage	69.4%	30.6%
- Turner: 50–60% 60–70% 70–80% 80–90% >90% Centonze: 50–60% 60–70% No votes
U.S. Representative before election
Erica Lee Carter
Democratic
Elected U.S. Representative
Sylvester Turner
Democratic

The 18th district is based in Downtown Houston and takes in the heavily black areas of Central Houston. The incumbent was Democrat Sheila Jackson Lee, who was re-elected with 70.72% of the vote in 2022. She ran in the 2023 Houston mayoral election, but lost to fellow Democrat John Whitmire in the runoff. Following her loss in the mayoral election, Jackson Lee soon filed for re-election to the U.S. House of Representatives. Nevertheless, Amanda Edwards, who had first filed to run for the 18th District House seat in June 2023, opted to remain as a candidate in the 2024 Democratic primary; Jackson Lee defeated Edwards, winning renomination. On July 19, 2024, Jackson Lee died due to complications from pancreatic cancer.

=== Democratic primary ===
==== Nominee ====
- Sheila Jackson Lee, incumbent U.S. representative (died July 19, 2024)

==== Eliminated in primary ====
- Amanda Edwards, former at-large Houston city councilor (2016–2020) and candidate for U.S. Senate in 2020

==== Withdrawn ====
- Isaiah Martin, government contract consultant and former intern for incumbent Sheila Jackson Lee (endorsed Jackson Lee)
- Robert Slater Jr., chef and convicted felon (endorsed Jackson Lee, remained on ballot)

==== Endorsements ====
Amanda Edwards

U.S. representatives

- Beto O'Rourke, former U.S. representative from Texas's 16th congressional district (2013–2019)

Local officials

- KP George, Fort Bend County judge (2019–present)

Individuals

- Cynthia Ginyard, chair of the Fort Bend County Democratic Party

Organizations

- Brady PAC
- Harvard College Democrats
- Vote Common Good
Sheila Jackson Lee (deceased)

Executive branch officials

- Joe Biden, president of the United States (2021–2025)
- Kamala Harris, vice president of the United States (2021–2025)

Organizations

- Feminist Majority PAC
- Houston LGBTQ+ Political Caucus
- Humane Society Legislative Fund
- Texas Medical Association PAC

Labor unions

- Texas AFL-CIO
- Texas American Federation of Teachers
- United Auto Workers

Newspapers

- Houston Chronicle

==== Fundraising ====
Campaign finance reports as of February 14, 2024
Candidate	Raised	Spent	Cash on hand
Amanda Edwards (D)	$1,487,067	$818,139	$668,927
Sheila Jackson Lee (D)	$241,613	$388,380	$224,543
Source: Federal Election Commission

==== Polling ====
Poll source	Date(s) administered	Sample size	Margin of error	Amanda Edwards	Sheila Jackson Lee	Robert Slater Jr.	Undecided
University of Houston	February 7–17, 2024	450 (LV)	± 4.6%	38%	43%	3%	16%

==== Results ====
Democratic primary results
Party	Candidate	Votes	%
Democratic	Sheila Jackson Lee (incumbent)	23,629	60.0
Democratic	Amanda Edwards	14,668	37.3
Democratic	Robert Slater Jr. (withdrawn)	1,059	2.7
Total votes		39,356	100.0

==== Replacement nominee selection ====
2024 Texas's 18th congressional district special Democratic convention
- August 13, 2024
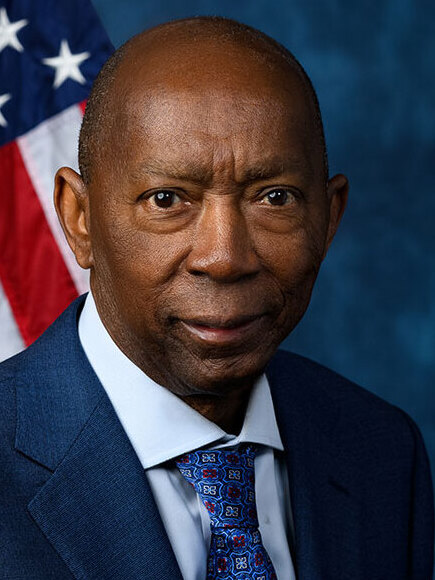

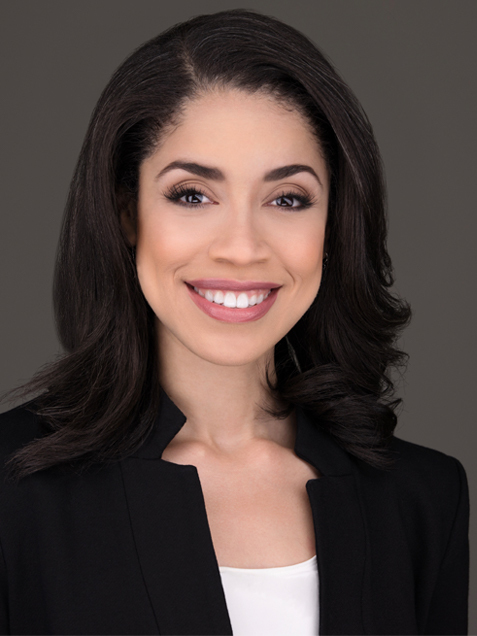
Nominee	Sylvester Turner	Amanda Edwards
Second ballot	41 (52.6%)	37 (47.4%)
First ballot	35 (44.3%)	34 (43.0%)
Elected nominee
Sylvester Turner
Democratic

Under Texas law, following Jackson Lee's death, the executive committee of the Harris County Democratic Party had to choose a replacement nominee by August 26. Otherwise, the Texas Democratic Party would choose a new nominee by August 28. On August 2, the Harris County Democratic Party announced that its precinct chairs would meet on August 13 to nominate a candidate.

===== Nominee =====
- Sylvester Turner, former mayor of Houston (2016–2024)

===== Eliminated at convention =====
- Amanda Edwards, former at-large Houston city councilor (2016–2020), candidate for this district in the 2024 regular election, and candidate for U.S. Senate in 2020
- Jarvis Johnson, state representative from the 139th district (2016–present) and candidate for this district in 2010
- Christina Morales, state representative from the 145th district (2019–present)
- Letitia Plummer, at-large Houston city councilor (2020–present) and candidate for the 22nd district in 2018

===== Withdrawn =====
- Dwight Boykins, former Houston city councilor from district D (2014–2019) and candidate for mayor of Houston in 2019 (endorsed Turner)
- Corisha Rogers, Harris County Democratic Party official
- Cortlan Wickliff, Rice University provost

===== Declined =====
- James Dixon, pastor and president of NAACP Houston
- Jolanda Jones, state representative from the 147th district (2022–present) (endorsed Turner)
- Christian Menefee, Harris County Attorney (2021–present) (endorsed Turner)

===== Endorsements =====
Sylvester Turner

U.S. representatives

- Lizzie Fletcher, U.S. representative from TX-07 (2019–present)

State legislators

- Alma Allen, state representative from the 131st district (2005–present)
- Garnet Coleman, state representative from the 147th district (1991–2022)
- Harold Dutton Jr., state representative from the 142nd district (1985–present)
- Ana Hernandez, state representative from the 143rd district (2005–present)
- Ann Johnson, state representative from the 134th district (2021–present)
- Jolanda Jones, state representative from the 147th district (2022–present)
- Ron Reynolds, state representative from the 27th district (2011–present)
- Armando Walle, state representative from the 140th district (2009–present)

Local officials

- Dwight Boykins, former Houston city councilor from district D (2014–2019)
- Rodney Ellis, Harris County commissioner (2017–present)
- Lina Hidalgo, Harris County judge (2019–present)
- Chris Hollins, Houston city controller (2024–present)
- Abbie Kamin, Houston city councilor from District C (2020–present)
- Christian Menefee, Harris County attorney (2021–present)

Party officials

- 30 Harris County Democratic precinct chairs

Individuals

- Erica Lee Carter, daughter of former U.S. representative Sheila Jackson Lee
- Jason Lee, son of former U.S. representative Sheila Jackson Lee

Organizations

- Everytown for Gun Safety (post-primary)

Labor unions

- SEIU Texas

Newspapers

- Houston Chronicle

===== Polling =====
Poll source	Date(s) administered	Sample size	Margin of error	Amanda Edwards	Jarvis Johnson	Christina Morales	Letitia Plumber	Sylvester Turner	Undecided
Texas Victory Consulting	August 5–7, 2024	1,113 (V)	± 2.0%	33%	9%	3%	3%	34%	16%

===== Convention results =====
Democratic convention results
Candidate	First ballot		Second ballot	
Candidate	Votes	%	Votes	%
Sylvester Turner	35	44.3%	41	52.6%
Amanda Edwards	34	43.0%	37	47.4%
Letitia Plummer	5	6.3%	Eliminated	
Christina Morales	3	3.8%	Eliminated	
Jarvis Johnson	2	2.5%	Eliminated	
Total	79	100.0%	78	100.0%

=== Republican primary ===
==== Nominee ====
- Lana Centonze, former federal employee

==== Eliminated in primary ====
- Aaron Hermes, engineer and candidate for the 22nd district in 2020

==== Endorsements ====
Declined to endorse

Newspapers

- Houston Chronicle

==== Fundraising ====
Campaign finance reports as of February 14, 2024
Candidate	Raised	Spent	Cash on hand
Lana Centonze (R)	$21,457 (Note: $17,700 of this total was self-funded by Centonze)	$21,081	$376
Source: Federal Election Commission

==== Results ====
Republican primary results
Party	Candidate	Votes	%
Republican	Lana Centonze	6,202	53.3
Republican	Aaron Hermes	5,438	46.7
Total votes		11,640	100.0

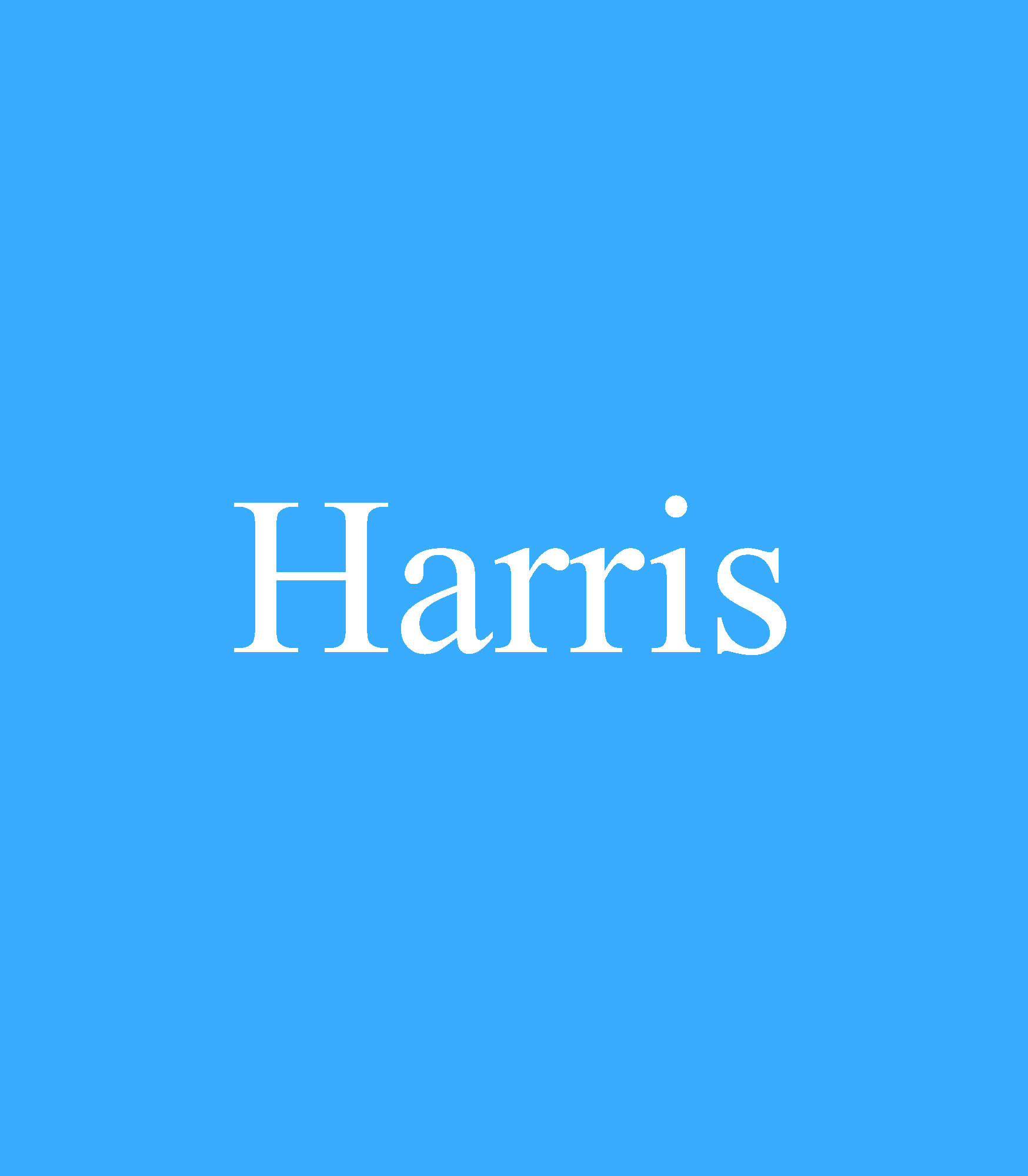
Cartogram of Texas' 18th congressional district

=== General election ===
==== Predictions ====
Source	Ranking	As of
The Cook Political Report	Solid D	February 2, 2023
Inside Elections	Solid D	March 10, 2023
Sabato's Crystal Ball	Safe D	February 23, 2023
Elections Daily	Safe D	September 7, 2023
CNalysis	Solid D	November 16, 2023
Decision Desk HQ	Safe D	June 14, 2024

==== Results ====
2024 Texas's 18th congressional district election
Party	Candidate	Votes	%
Democratic	Sylvester Turner	151,834	69.4
Republican	Lana Centonze	66,810	30.6
Write-in	Vince Duncan	62	0.03
Write-in	Kevin Dural	14	0.01
Total votes		218,720	100.00
Democratic hold			

==== By county ====
County	Sylvester Turner Democratic		Lana Centonze Republican		Various candidates Other parties		Margin		Total votes cast
County	#	%	#	%	#	%	#	%	Total votes cast
Harris	151,834	69.42%	66,810	30.55%	76	0.03%	85,024	38.87%	218,720
Totals	151,834	69.42%	66,810	30.55%	76	0.03%	85,024	38.87%	218,720

== District 19 ==
2024 Texas's 19th congressional district election
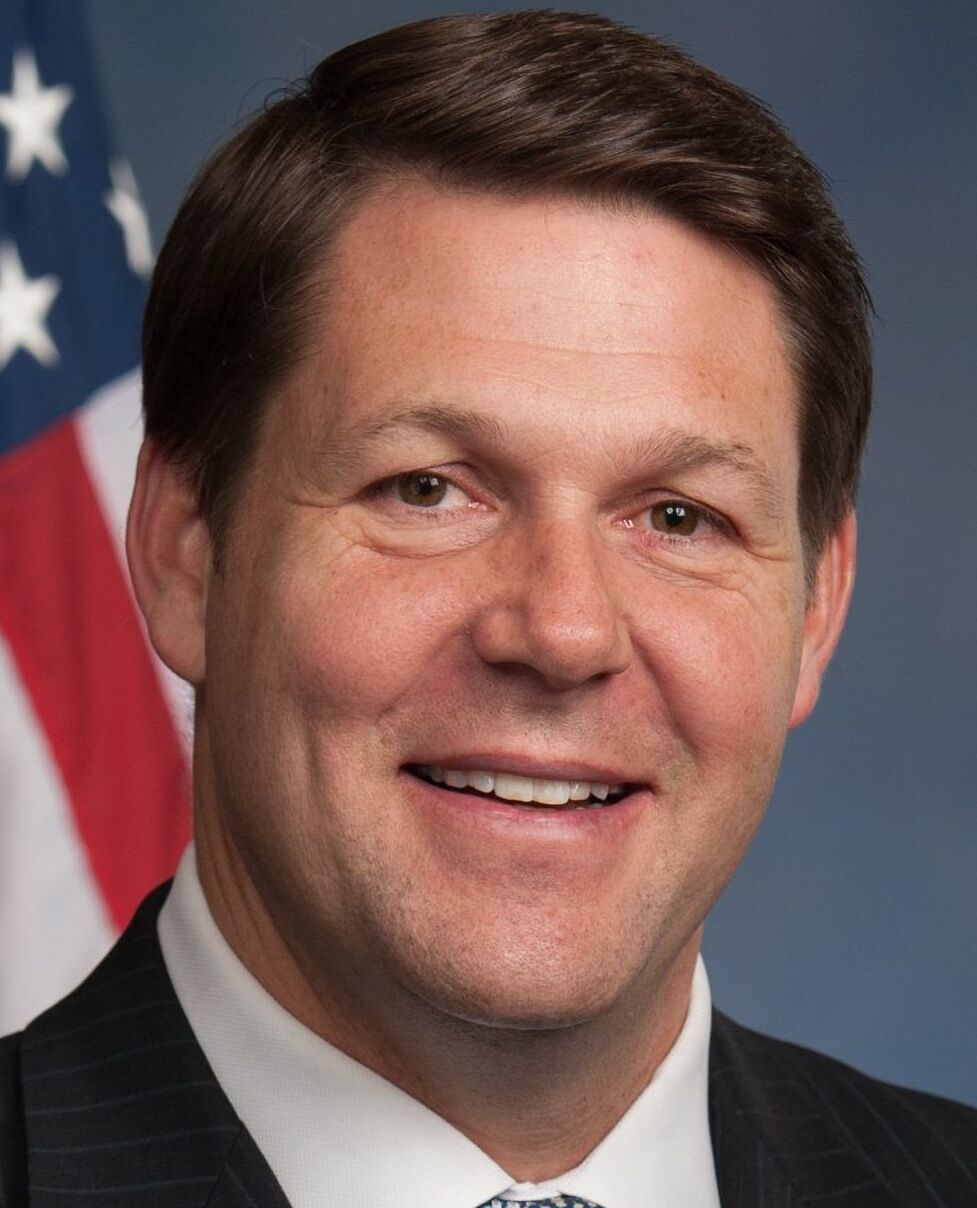

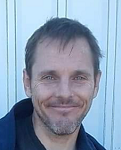

Nominee	Jodey Arrington	Nathan Lewis	Bernard Johnson
Party	Republican	Independent	Libertarian
Popular vote	214,600	27,386	23,889
Percentage	80.7%	10.3%	9.0%
- Arrington: 30–40% 40–50% 50–60% 60–70% 70–80% 80–90% >90% Lewis: 40–50% No votes
U.S. Representative before election
Jodey Arrington
Republican
Elected U.S. Representative
Jodey Arrington
Republican

The incumbent was Republican Jodey Arrington, who was re-elected with 80.30% of the vote in 2022.

=== Republican primary ===
==== Nominee ====
- Jodey Arrington, incumbent U.S. representative

==== Eliminated in primary ====
- Vance Boyd, rancher, former professional bull rider, and candidate for this district in 2020
- Chance Ferguson, retiree
- Ryan Zink, convicted felon and participant in the January 6 United States Capitol attack

==== Endorsements ====
Jodey Arrington

Executive branch officials

- Donald Trump, 45th president of the United States

Organizations

- AIPAC
- National Rifle Association Political Victory Fund
- Texas Alliance for Life
- Texas Medical Association PAC

==== Fundraising ====
Campaign finance reports as of February 14, 2024
Candidate	Raised	Spent	Cash on hand
Jodey Arrington (R)	$1,836,140	$1,549,940	$1,607,530
Vance Boyd (R)	$35,145 (Note: $25,000 of this total was self-funded by Boyd)	$32,955	$2,114
Ryan Zink (R)	$4,947	$3,554	$1,393
Source: Federal Election Commission

==== Results ====
Republican primary results
Party	Candidate	Votes	%
Republican	Jodey Arrington (incumbent)	70,705	83.5
Republican	Chance Ferguson	6,316	7.5
Republican	Vance Boyd	5,116	6.0
Republican	Ryan Zink	2,586	3.1
Total votes		84,723	100.0

=== General election ===
==== Predictions ====
Source	Ranking	As of
The Cook Political Report	Solid R	February 2, 2023
Inside Elections	Solid R	March 10, 2023
Sabato's Crystal Ball	Safe R	February 23, 2023
Elections Daily	Safe R	September 7, 2023
CNalysis	Solid R	November 16, 2023
Decision Desk HQ	Safe R	June 14, 2024

==== Results ====
2024 Texas's 19th congressional district election
Party	Candidate	Votes	%
Republican	Jodey Arrington (incumbent)	214,600	80.7%
Independent	Nathan Lewis	27,386	10.3%
Libertarian	Bernard Johnson	23,889	9.0%
Total votes		265,875	100.0%
Republican hold			

==== By county ====
County	Jodey Arrington Republican		Nathan Lewis Independent		Bernard Johnson Libertarian		Margin		Total votes cast
County	#	%	#	%	#	%	#	%	Total votes cast
Andrews	5,003	88.88%	276	4.90%	350	6.22%	4,653	82.66%	5,629
Bailey	1,416	87.46%	80	4.94%	123	7.60%	1,293	79.86%	1,619
Borden	370	98.14%	5	1.3%	2	0.5%	365	96.82%	377
Callahan	669	89.68%	38	5.09%	39	5.23%	630	84.45%	746
Castro	1,534	80.44%	45	2.36%	328	17.20%	1,206	63.24%	1,907
Cochran	735	86.47%	49	5.76%	66	7.76%	669	78.71%	850
Crosby	1,490	82.46%	179	9.91%	138	7.64%	1,311	72.55%	1,807
Dawson	2,782	84.35%	271	8.22%	245	7.43%	2,511	76.14%	3,298
Fisher	1,524	88.45%	104	6.04%	95	5.51%	1,429	82.94%	1,723
Floyd	1,731	87.38%	119	6.01%	131	6.61%	1,600	80.77%	1,981
Gaines	5,755	92.26%	223	3.57%	260	4.17%	5,495	88.09%	6,238
Garza	1,364	90.57%	64	4.25%	78	5.18%	1,286	85.39%	1,506
Hale	7,438	83.28%	788	8.82%	705	7.89%	6,650	74.46%	8,931
Haskell	1,825	89.33%	133	6.51%	85	4.16%	1,692	82.82%	2,043
Hockley	6,769	87.32%	521	6.72%	462	5.96%	6,248	80.60%	7,752
Howard	7,266	84.71%	760	8.86%	552	6.44%	6,506	75.85%	8,578
Jones	5,960	88.84%	388	5.78%	361	5.38%	5,572	83.05%	6,709
Kent	385	90.16%	23	5.39%	19	4.45%	362	84.78%	427
Lamb	3,463	87.16%	213	5.36%	297	7.48%	3,166	79.69%	3,973
Lubbock	87,899	75.25%	16,021	13.72%	12,887	11.03%	71,878	61.54%	116,807
Lynn	2,186	89.15%	134	5.46%	132	5.38%	2,052	83.69%	2,452
Martin	1,790	89.54%	110	5.50%	99	4.95%	1,680	84.04%	1,999
Mitchell	2,113	89.38%	126	5.33%	125	5.29%	1,987	84.05%	2,364
Nolan	4,116	85.66%	327	6.81%	362	7.53%	3,754	78.13%	4,805
Parmer	2,113	89.31%	104	4.40%	149	6.30%	1,964	83.01%	2,366
Scurry	4,852	89.16%	284	5.22%	306	5.62%	4,546	83.54%	5,442
Shackelford	1,580	93.11%	73	4.30%	44	2.59%	1,507	88.80%	1,697
Stonewall	604	86.29%	4	0.57%	92	13.14%	512	73.14%	700
Swisher	1,819	86.00%	123	5.82%	173	8.18%	1,646	77.83%	2,115
Taylor	42,801	80.59%	5,745	10.82%	4,561	8.59%	37,056	69.78%	53,107
Terry	2,763	83.65%	62	1.88%	478	14.47%	2,285	69.18%	3,303
Throckmorton	813	93.23%	39	4.47%	20	2.29%	774	88.76%	872
Yoakum	2,022	89.79%	89	3.95%	141	6.26%	1,881	83.53%	2,252
Totals	214,9505	80.69%	27,461	10.31%	23,964	9.00%	23,964	70.39%	266,375

== District 20 ==
2024 Texas's 20th congressional district election
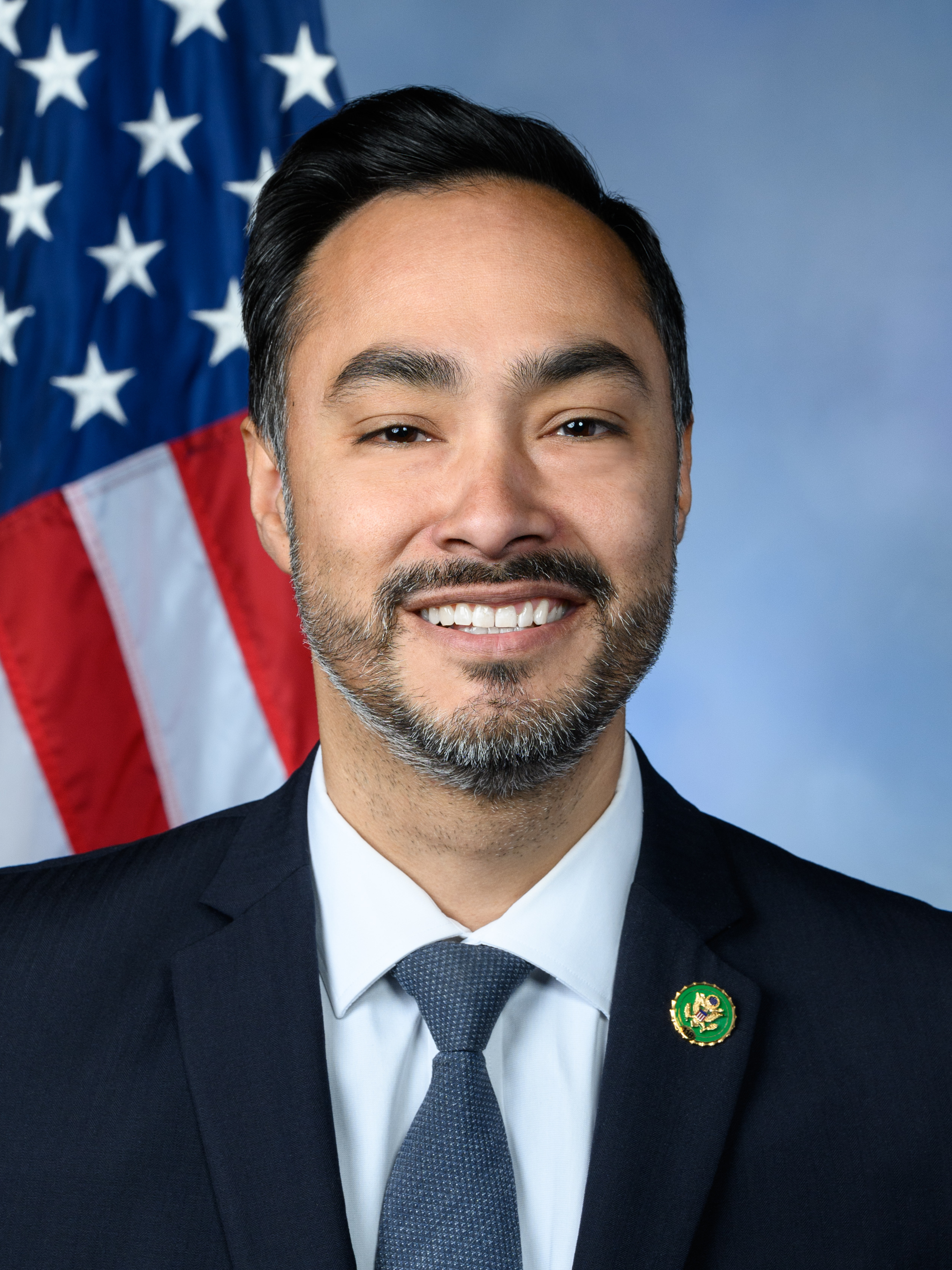
Nominee	Joaquin Castro
Party	Democratic
Popular vote	157,890
Percentage	100.0%
- Castro: ≥90%
U.S. Representative before election
Joaquin Castro
Democratic
Elected U.S. Representative
Joaquin Castro
Democratic

The 20th district encompasses downtown San Antonio. The incumbent was Democrat Joaquin Castro, who was re-elected with 68.43% of the vote in 2022.

=== Democratic primary ===
==== Nominee ====
- Joaquin Castro, incumbent U.S. representative

==== Endorsements ====
Joaquin Castro

Organizations

- Feminist Majority PAC
- Humane Society Legislative Fund
- J Street PAC
- Joint Action Committee for Political Affairs
- NextGen America PAC (post-primary)
- Planned Parenthood Action Fund
- Population Connection Action Fund
- Stonewall Democrats of San Antonio
- Texas Medical Association PAC

Labor unions

- Texas American Federation of Teachers
- United Farm Workers

==== Fundraising ====
Campaign finance reports as of February 14, 2024
Candidate	Raised	Spent	Cash on hand
Joaquin Castro (D)	$353,099	$322,883	$192,959
Source: Federal Election Commission

==== Results ====
Democratic primary results
Party	Candidate	Votes	%
Democratic	Joaquin Castro (incumbent)	25,018	100.0
Total votes		25,018	100.0

=== General election ===
==== Predictions ====
Source	Ranking	As of
The Cook Political Report	Solid D	February 2, 2023
Inside Elections	Solid D	March 10, 2023
Sabato's Crystal Ball	Safe D	February 23, 2023
Elections Daily	Safe D	September 7, 2023
CNalysis	Solid D	November 16, 2023
Decision Desk HQ	Safe D	June 14, 2024

==== Results ====
2024 Texas's 20th congressional district election
Party	Candidate	Votes	%
Democratic	Joaquin Castro (incumbent)	157,890	100.00%
Democratic hold			

===== By county =====
County	Joaquin Castro Democratic
County	Votes
Bexar	157,890
Totals	157,890

== District 21 ==
2024 Texas's 21st congressional district election
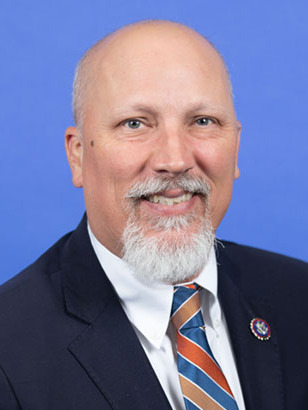

Nominee	Chip Roy	Kristin Hook
Party	Republican	Democratic
Popular vote	263,744	153,765
Percentage	61.9%	36.1%
- Roy: 40–50% 50–60% 60–70% 70–80% 80–90% >90% Hook: 40–50% 50–60% 60–70% 70–80% 80–90% No votes
U.S. Representative before election
Chip Roy
Republican
Elected U.S. Representative
Chip Roy
Republican

The incumbent was Republican Chip Roy, who was re-elected with 62.84% of the vote in 2022.

=== Republican primary ===
==== Nominee ====
- Chip Roy, incumbent U.S. representative

==== Endorsements ====
Chip Roy

Organizations

- National Rifle Association Political Victory Fund
- Texas Alliance for Life
- Texas Medical Association PAC
- Turning Point Action
- Young Conservatives of Texas

Labor unions

- Deputy Sheriff’s Association of Bexar County

==== Fundraising ====
Campaign finance reports as of February 14, 2024
Candidate	Raised	Spent	Cash on hand
Chip Roy (R)	$1,581,135	$848,409	$1,981,448
Source: Federal Election Commission

==== Results ====
Republican primary results
Party	Candidate	Votes	%
Republican	Chip Roy (incumbent)	96,610	100.0
Total votes		96,610	100.0

=== Democratic primary ===
==== Nominee ====
- Kristin Hook, scientist

==== Endorsements ====
Kristin Hook

Organizations

- Stonewall Democrats of San Antonio
- Vote Common Good (post-primary)

Labor unions

- Texas AFL-CIO
- United Auto Workers

==== Fundraising ====
Campaign finance reports as of February 14, 2024
Candidate	Raised	Spent	Cash on hand
Kristin Hook (D)	$56,981	$13,806	$43,175
Source: Federal Election Commission

==== Results ====
Democratic primary results
Party	Candidate	Votes	%
Democratic	Kristin Hook	28,579	100.0
Total votes		28,579	100.0

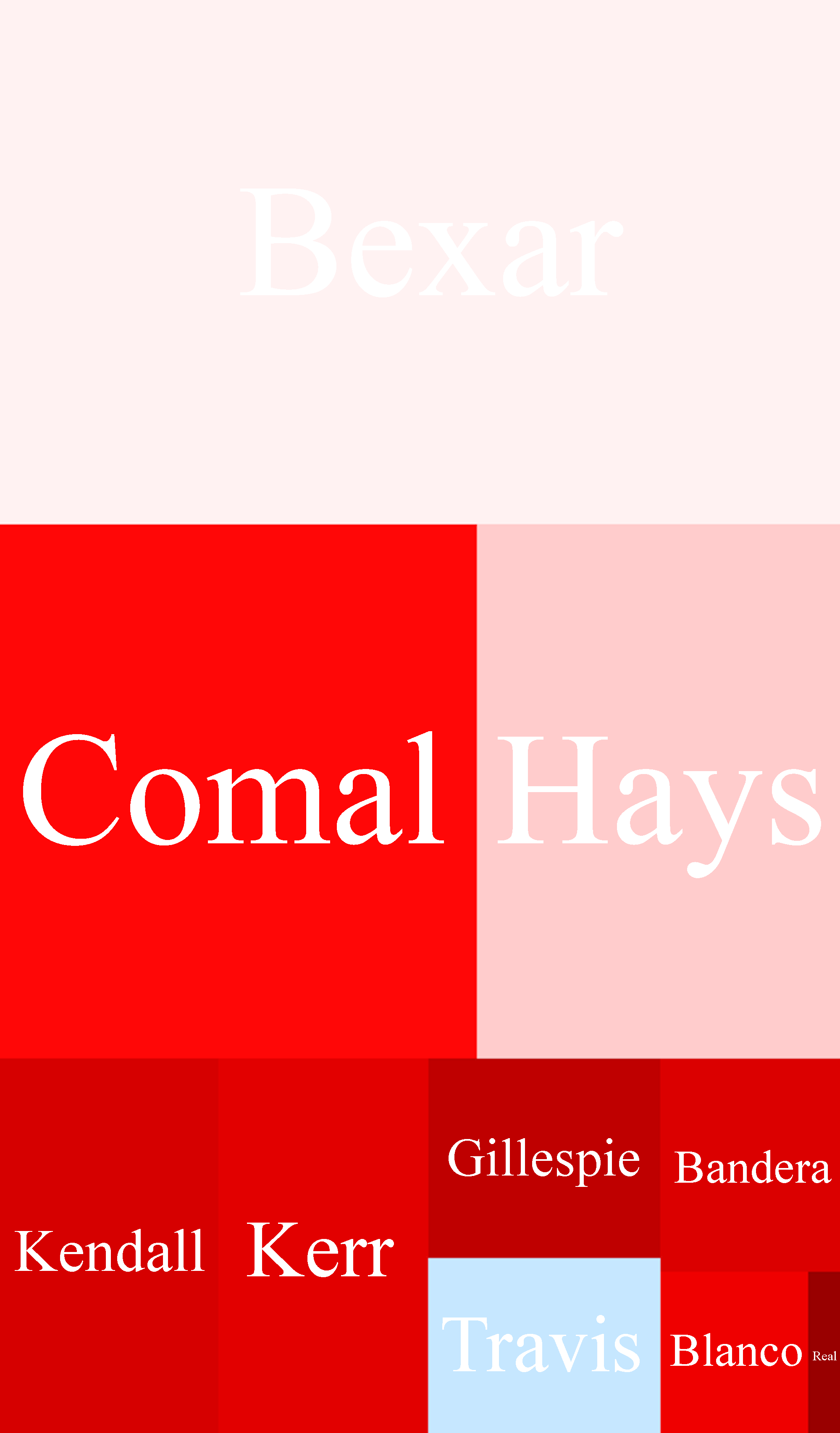
Cartogram of Texas' 21st congressional district

=== General election ===
==== Predictions ====
Source	Ranking	As of
The Cook Political Report	Solid R	February 2, 2023
Inside Elections	Solid R	March 10, 2023
Sabato's Crystal Ball	Safe R	February 23, 2023
Elections Daily	Safe R	September 7, 2023
CNalysis	Solid R	November 16, 2023
Decision Desk HQ	Safe R	June 14, 2024

==== Results ====
2024 Texas's 21st congressional district election
Party	Candidate	Votes	%
Republican	Chip Roy (incumbent)	263,744	61.85
Democratic	Kristin Hook	153,765	36.06
Libertarian	Bob King	8,914	2.09
Total votes		426,423	100.00
Republican hold			

==== By county ====
County	Chip Roy Republican		Kristin Hook Democratic		Bob King Libertarian		Margin		Total votes cast
County	#	%	#	%	#	%	#	%	Total votes cast
Bandera	10,760	79.98%	2,401	17.85%	293	2.18%	8,359	62.13%	13,454
Bexar	78,511	50.33%	74,478	47.75%	2,995	1.92%	4,033	2.59%	155,984
Blanco	6,360	75.73%	1,889	22.49%	149	1.77%	4,471	53.24%	8,398
Comal	66,045	73.09%	22,098	24.46%	2,214	2.45%	43,947	48.64%	90,357
Gillespie	13,165	80.31%	2,954	18.02%	273	1.67%	10,211	62.29%	16,392
Hays	37,051	53.82%	30,114	43.74%	1,683	2.44%	6,937	10.08%	68,848
Kendall	22,633	78.10%	5,842	20.16%	505	1.74%	16,791	57.94%	28,980
Kerr	21,386	76.92%	5,925	21.31%	491	1.77%	15,461	55.61%	27,802
Real	1,599	83.85%	284	14.89%	24	1.26%	1,315	68.96%	1,907
Travis	6,234	43.59%	7,780	54.40%	287	2.01%	−1,546	−10.81%	14,301
Totals	263,744	61.85%	153,765	36.06%	8,914	2.09%	109,979	25.79%	426,423

== District 22 ==
2024 Texas's 22nd congressional district election
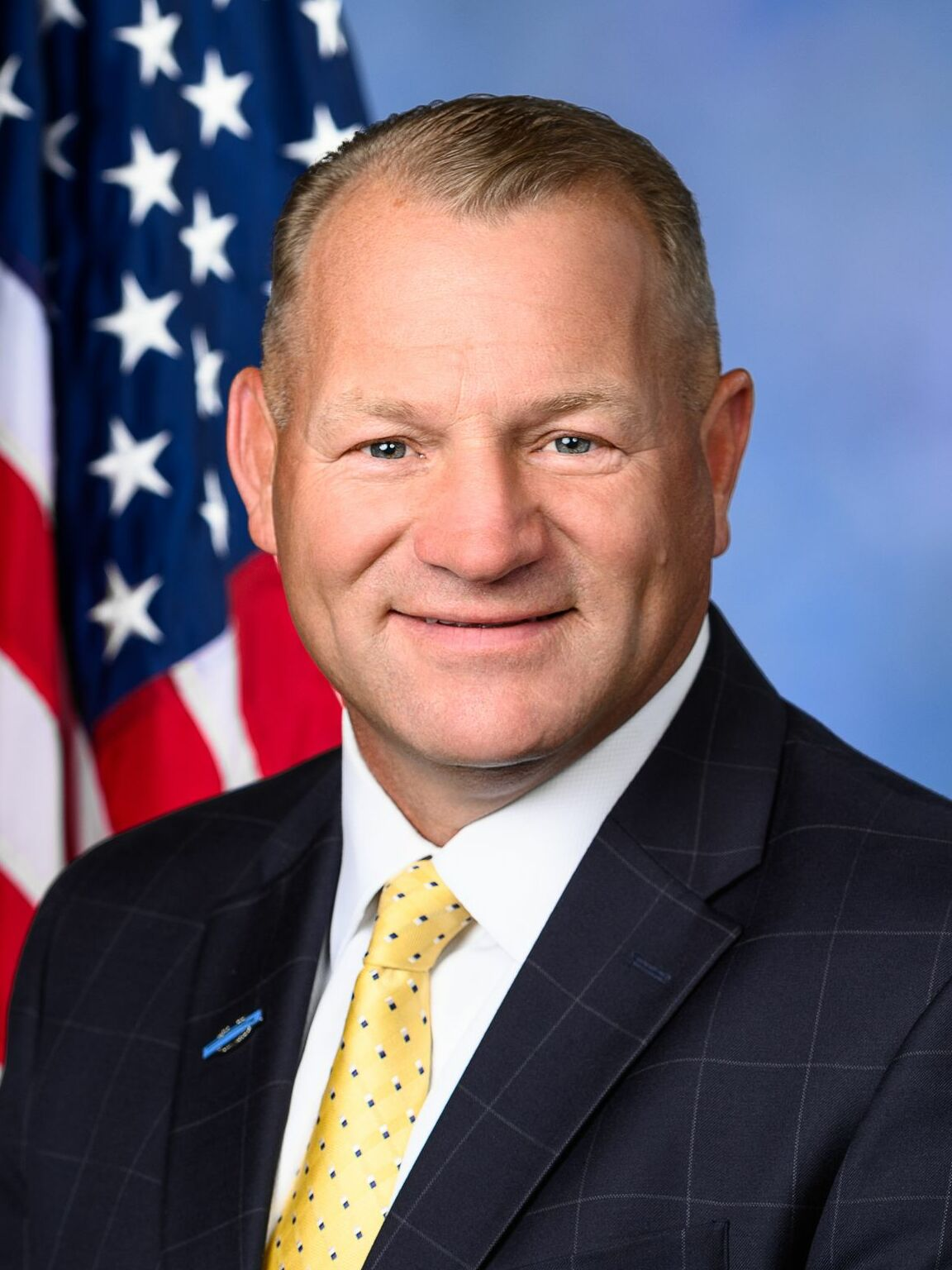

Nominee	Troy Nehls	Marquette Greene-Scott
Party	Republican	Democratic
Popular vote	209,285	127,604
Percentage	62.1%	37.9%
- Nehls: 50–60% 60–70% 70–80% 80–90% >90% Greene-Scott: 50–60% 60–70% 70–80% No votes
U.S. Representative before election
Troy Nehls
Republican
Elected U.S. Representative
Troy Nehls
Republican

The 22nd district encompasses the south-central Greater Houston metropolitan area, including the southern Houston suburbs of Sugar Land, Pearland, and Webster. The incumbent was Republican Troy Nehls, who was re-elected with 62.23% of the vote in 2022.

=== Republican primary ===
==== Nominee ====
- Troy Nehls, incumbent U.S. representative

==== Endorsements ====
Troy Nehls

Executive branch officials

- Donald Trump, 45th president of the United States

Organizations

- AIPAC
- National Rifle Association Political Victory Fund
- Texas Alliance for Life
- Texas Medical Association PAC
- Turning Point Action

==== Fundraising ====
Campaign finance reports as of February 14, 2024
Candidate	Raised	Spent	Cash on hand
Troy Nehls (R)	$529,342	$333,020	$588,454
Source: Federal Election Commission

==== Results ====
Republican primary results
Party	Candidate	Votes	%
Republican	Troy Nehls (incumbent)	62,862	100.0
Total votes		62,862	100.0

=== Democratic primary ===
==== Nominee ====
- Marquette Greene-Scott, Iowa Colony city councilor

==== Eliminated in primary ====
- Wayne Raasch, teacher and perennial candidate

==== Endorsements ====
Marquette Greene-Scott

Labor unions

- Texas AFL-CIO
- United Auto Workers

Newspapers

- Houston Chronicle

==== Fundraising ====
Campaign finance reports as of February 14, 2024
Candidate	Raised	Spent	Cash on hand
Marquette Greene-Scott (D)	$9,225	$5,946	$6,693
Source: Federal Election Commission

==== Results ====
Democratic primary results
Party	Candidate	Votes	%
Democratic	Marquette Greene-Scott	17,290	81.7
Democratic	Wayne Raasch	3,877	18.3
Total votes		21,167	100.0

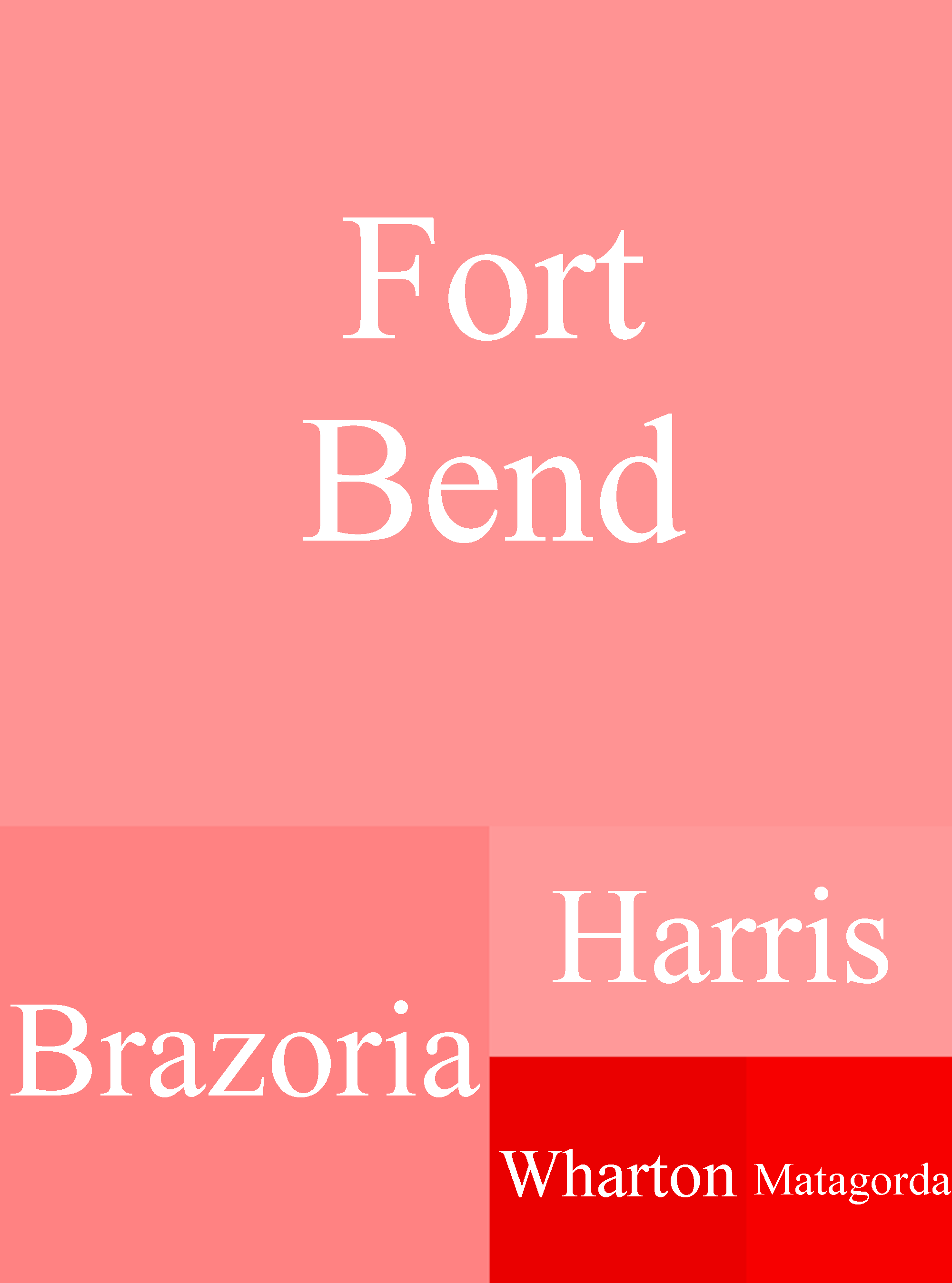
Cartogram of Texas' 22nd congressional district

=== General election ===
==== Predictions ====
Source	Ranking	As of
The Cook Political Report	Solid R	February 2, 2023
Inside Elections	Solid R	March 10, 2023
Sabato's Crystal Ball	Safe R	February 23, 2023
Elections Daily	Safe R	September 7, 2023
CNalysis	Solid R	November 16, 2023
Decision Desk HQ	Safe R	June 14, 2024

==== Results ====
2024 Texas's 22nd congressional district election
Party	Candidate	Votes	%
Republican	Troy Nehls (incumbent)	209,285	62.12
Democratic	Marquette Greene-Scott	127,604	37.88
Total votes		336,889	100.00
Republican hold			

==== By county ====
County	Troy Nehls Republican		Marquette Greene-Scott Democratic		Margin		Total votes cast
County	#	%	#	%	#	%	Total votes cast
Brazoria	38,458	62.30%	23,273	37.70%	15,185	24.60%	61,731
Fort Bend	131,063	60.46%	85,720	39.54%	45,343	20.92%	216,783
Harris	17,657	59.96%	11,791	40.04%	5,866	19.93%	29,448
Matagorda	9,771	75.69%	3,138	24.31%	6,633	51.38%	12,909
Wharton	12,336	77.01%	3,682	22.99%	8,654	54.03%	16,018
Totals	209,285	62.12%	127,604	37.88%	81,681	24.25%	336,889

== District 23 ==
2024 Texas's 23rd congressional district election
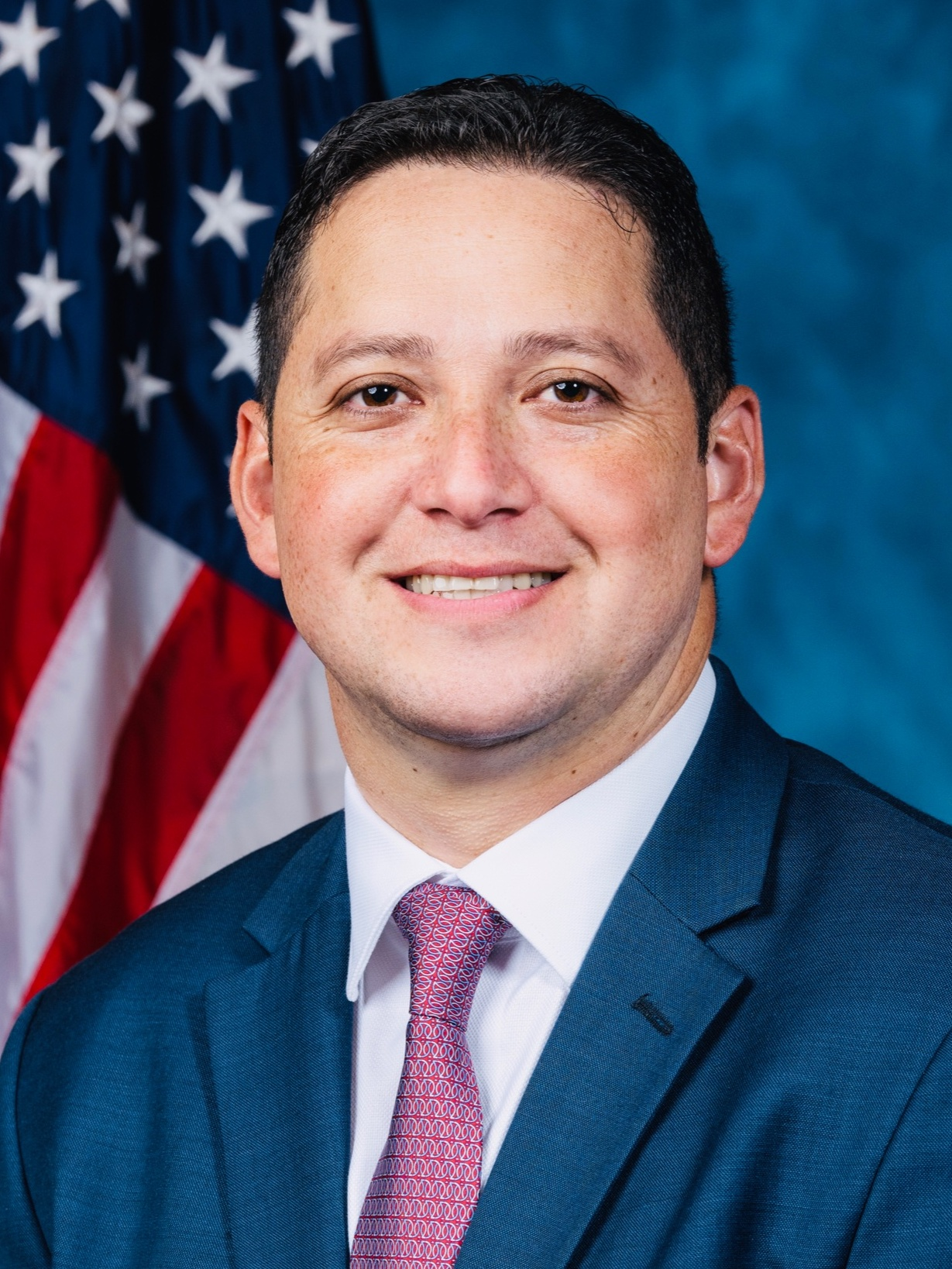

Nominee	Tony Gonzales	Santos Limon
Party	Republican	Democratic
Popular vote	180,720	109,373
Percentage	62.3%	37.7%
- Gonzales: 50–60% 60–70% 70–80% 80–90% >90% Limon: 50–60% 60–70% 80–90% Tie: 50% No votes
U.S. Representative before election
Tony Gonzales
Republican
Elected U.S. Representative
Tony Gonzales
Republican

The 23rd district covers southwestern Texas, including the Big Bend, the southern and western suburbs of San Antonio, and the southwestern suburbs of El Paso. The incumbent was Republican Tony Gonzales, who was re-elected with 55.87% of the vote in 2022. In 2023, Gonzales was censured by the Texas Republican Party due to his vote for the Bipartisan Safer Communities Act. The bill was passed in response to the Robb Elementary School shooting, which took place in Uvalde, Texas, within the 23rd district. In the primary, Gonzales faced several conservative challengers. Gonzales won only 45% of the vote in the primary, prompting a runoff against Brandon Herrera, a firearms manufacturer and YouTuber who was in second place. Gonzales narrowly won the runoff with 50.6% of the vote.

=== Republican primary ===
==== Nominee ====
- Tony Gonzales, incumbent U.S. representative

==== Eliminated in runoff ====
- Brandon Herrera, firearms manufacturer and YouTuber

==== Eliminated in primary ====
- Victor Avila, former ICE special agent and candidate for Land Commissioner in 2022 (endorsed Herrera in runoff)
- Julie Clark, former chair of the Medina County Republican Party (endorsed Herrera in runoff)
- Frank Lopez Jr., retired U.S. Border Patrol agent and independent candidate for this district in 2022

==== Declined ====
- Thaddeus Cleveland, Terrell County sheriff

==== Endorsements ====
Tony Gonzales

U.S. representatives

- Jake Ellzey, U.S. representative from Texas's 6th congressional district (2021–present)
- Ronny Jackson, U.S. representative from Texas's 13th congressional district (2021–present)
- Mike Johnson, Speaker of the U.S. House of Representatives (2023–2027) from Louisiana's 4th congressional district (2017–present)

Statewide officials

- Greg Abbott, governor of Texas (2015–2027)
- Dan Patrick, lieutenant governor of Texas (2015–2027)

Local officials

- Dee Margo, former mayor of El Paso (2017–2021)

Organizations

- AIPAC
- BIPAC (post-primary)
- National Federation of Independent Business
- National Right to Life Committee
- Pro-Israel America
- Republican Jewish Coalition
- Texas Alliance for Life
- Texas Medical Association PAC
- U.S. Chamber of Commerce (post-primary)
- With Honor Fund

Labor unions

- Bexar County Deputy Sheriff’s Association
- Combined Law Enforcement Associations of Texas
Brandon Herrera

Statewide officials

- Sid Miller, Agriculture Commissioner of Texas (2015–present)

U.S. representatives

- Andy Biggs, U.S. representative from Arizona's 5th congressional district (2017–present)
- Eric Burlison, U.S. representative from Missouri's 7th congressional district (2023–present)
- Eli Crane, U.S. representative from Arizona's 2nd congressional district (2023–present)
- Matt Gaetz, U.S. representative from Florida's 1st congressional district (2017–2024)
- Bob Good, U.S. representative from Virginia's 5th congressional district (2021–2025) and chair of the House Freedom Caucus (2024)
- Ralph Norman, U.S. representative from South Carolina's 5th congressional district (2017–present)

Individuals

- Victor Avila, former ICE special agent, candidate for Land Commissioner in 2022, and former candidate for this district
- Julie Clark, former chair of the Medina County Republican Party and former candidate for this district
- Cody Garrett, former police officer and YouTuber known as "Donut Operator"
- Kyle Rittenhouse, gun-rights activist and shooter in the Kenosha unrest shooting

Organizations

- Gun Owners of America
- House Freedom Fund
- Republicans for National Renewal
Declined to endorse

Executive branch officials

- Donald Trump, 45th president of the United States

==== Fundraising ====
Campaign finance reports as of March 31, 2024
Candidate	Raised	Spent	Cash on hand
Victor Avila (R)	$113,839 (Note: $9,800 of this total was self-funded by Avila)	$112,963	$876
Julie Clark (R)	$1,006,567 (Note: $38,555 of this total was self-funded by Clark)	$1,005,092	$1,475
Tony Gonzales (R)	$3,734,350	$2,545,761	$1,542,977
Brandon Herrera (R)	$1,213,769 (Note: $50,000 of this total was self-funded by Herrera)	$911,383	$302,386
Frank Lopez Jr. (R)	$7,260	$127	$7,132
Source: Federal Election Commission

==== Results ====
Results by county Gonzales: 30–40% Gonzales; 40–50% Gonzales; 50–60% Gonzales; 60–70% Gonzales

Results by precinct Gonzales: 20–30%; 30–40%; 40–50%; 50–60%; 60–70%; 70–80%; 80–90%; 90–100%; Herrera: 30–40%; 40–50%; 50–60%; 60–70%; 70–80%; 90–100%; Clark: 30–40%; 40–50%; Avila: 30–40%; 40–50%; Lopez: 20–30%; 30–40%; 40–50%; No votes cast

Republican primary results
Party	Candidate	Votes	%
Republican	Tony Gonzales (incumbent)	25,988	45.1
Republican	Brandon Herrera	14,201	24.6
Republican	Julie Clark	7,994	13.9
Republican	Frank Lopez Jr.	6,266	10.9
Republican	Victor Avila	3,181	5.5
Total votes		57,630	100.0

==== Primary runoff results ====
Results by county Gonzales: 50–60% Gonzales; 60–70% Gonzales; Herrera: 50–60% Herrera; 60–70% Herrera; 70–80% Herrera; 80–90% Herrera

Results by precinct Gonzales: 50–60%; 60–70%; 70–80%; 80–90%; 90–100%; Herrera: 50–60%; 60–70%; 70–80%; 80–90%; 90–100%; No votes cast

Republican primary results
Party	Candidate	Votes	%
Republican	Tony Gonzales (incumbent)	15,023	50.6
Republican	Brandon Herrera	14,669	49.4
Total votes		29,692	100.0

=== Democratic primary ===
==== Nominee ====
- Santos Limon, civil engineer

==== Eliminated in primary ====
- Lee Bausinger, chemical process engineer

==== Endorsements ====
Lee Bausinger

Organizations

- Stonewall Democrats of San Antonio
Santos Limon

Labor unions

- Texas AFL-CIO
- United Auto Workers

==== Fundraising ====
Campaign finance reports as of February 14, 2024
Candidate	Raised	Spent	Cash on hand
Santos Limon (D)	$87,939 (Note: $86,413 of this total was self-funded by Limon)	$85,877	$2,062
Source: Federal Election Commission

==== Results ====
Results by county: Limon: 80–90% Limon; 70–80% Limon; 60–70% Limon; 50–60% Limon; Bausinger: 50–60% Bausinger; No votes

Democratic primary results
Party	Candidate	Votes	%
Democratic	Santos Limon	16,316	58.5
Democratic	Lee Bausinger	11,577	41.5
Total votes		27,893	100.0

=== General election ===
==== Predictions ====
Source	Ranking	As of
The Cook Political Report	Solid R	February 2, 2023
Inside Elections	Solid R	March 10, 2023
Sabato's Crystal Ball	Safe R	February 23, 2023
Elections Daily	Safe R	September 7, 2023
CNalysis	Solid R	November 16, 2023
Decision Desk HQ	Safe R	June 14, 2024

==== Results ====
2024 Texas's 23rd congressional district election
Party	Candidate	Votes	%
Republican	Tony Gonzales (incumbent)	180,720	62.30
Democratic	Santos Limon	109,373	37.70
Total votes		290,093	100.00
Republican hold			

==== By county ====
County	Tony Gonzales Republican		Santos Limon Democratic		Margin		Total votes cast
County	#	%	#	%	#	%	Total votes cast
Bexar	97,031	58.85%	67,861	41.15%	29,170	17.69%	164,892
Brewster	2,584	59.08%	1,790	40.92%	794	18.15%	4,374
Crane	1,132	86.74%	173	13.26%	959	73.49%	1,305
Crockett	1,058	80.15%	262	19.85%	796	60.30%	1,320
Culberson	454	63.23%	264	36.77%	190	26.46%	718
Dimmit	1,511	50.15%	1,502	49.85%	9	0.30%	3,013
Edwards	810	88.43%	106	11.57%	704	76.86%	916
El Paso	10,040	51.52%	9,449	48.48%	591	3.03%	19,489
Edwards	2,961	65.13%	1,585	34.87%	1,376	30.27%	4,546
Frio	2,961	65.13%	1,585	34.87%	1,376	30.27%	4,546
Hudspeth	757	77.09%	225	22.91%	532	54.18%	982
Jeff Davis	723	64.15%	404	35.85%	319	28.31%	1,127
Kinney	1,039	79.07%	275	20.93%	764	58.14%	1,314
LaSalle	1,254	64.34%	695	35.66%	559	28.68%	1,949
Loving	75	87.21%	11	12.79%	64	74.42%	86
Maverick	9,015	63.51%	5,179	36.49%	3,836	27.03%	14,194
Medina	18,151	75.54%	5,878	24.46%	12,273	51.08%	24,029
Pecos	3,075	76.53%	943	23.47%	2,132	53.06%	4,018
Presidio	769	40.60%	1,125	59.40%	−356	−18.80%	1,894
Reagan	795	86.98%	119	13.02%	676	73.96%	914
Reeves	2,271	71.94%	886	28.06%	1,385	43.87%	3,157
Schleicher	908	84.54%	166	15.46%	742	69.09%	1,074
Sutton	1,174	86.13%	189	13.87%	985	72.27%	1,363
Terrell	297	79.20%	78	20.80%	219	58.40%	375
Upton	1,091	90.24%	118	9.76%	973	80.48%	1,209
Uvalde	6,750	71.21%	2,729	28.79%	4,021	42.42%	9,479
Val Verde	8,929	64.57%	4,899	35.43%	4,030	29.14%	13,828
Ward	3,072	84.84%	549	15.16%	2,523	69.68%	3,621
Winkler	1,601	86.73%	245	13.27%	1,356	73.46%	1,846
Zavala	1,393	45.51%	1,668	54.49%	−275	−8.98%	3,061
Totals	180,720	62.30%	109,373	37.70%	71,347	24.59%	290,093

== District 24 ==
2024 Texas's 24th congressional district election
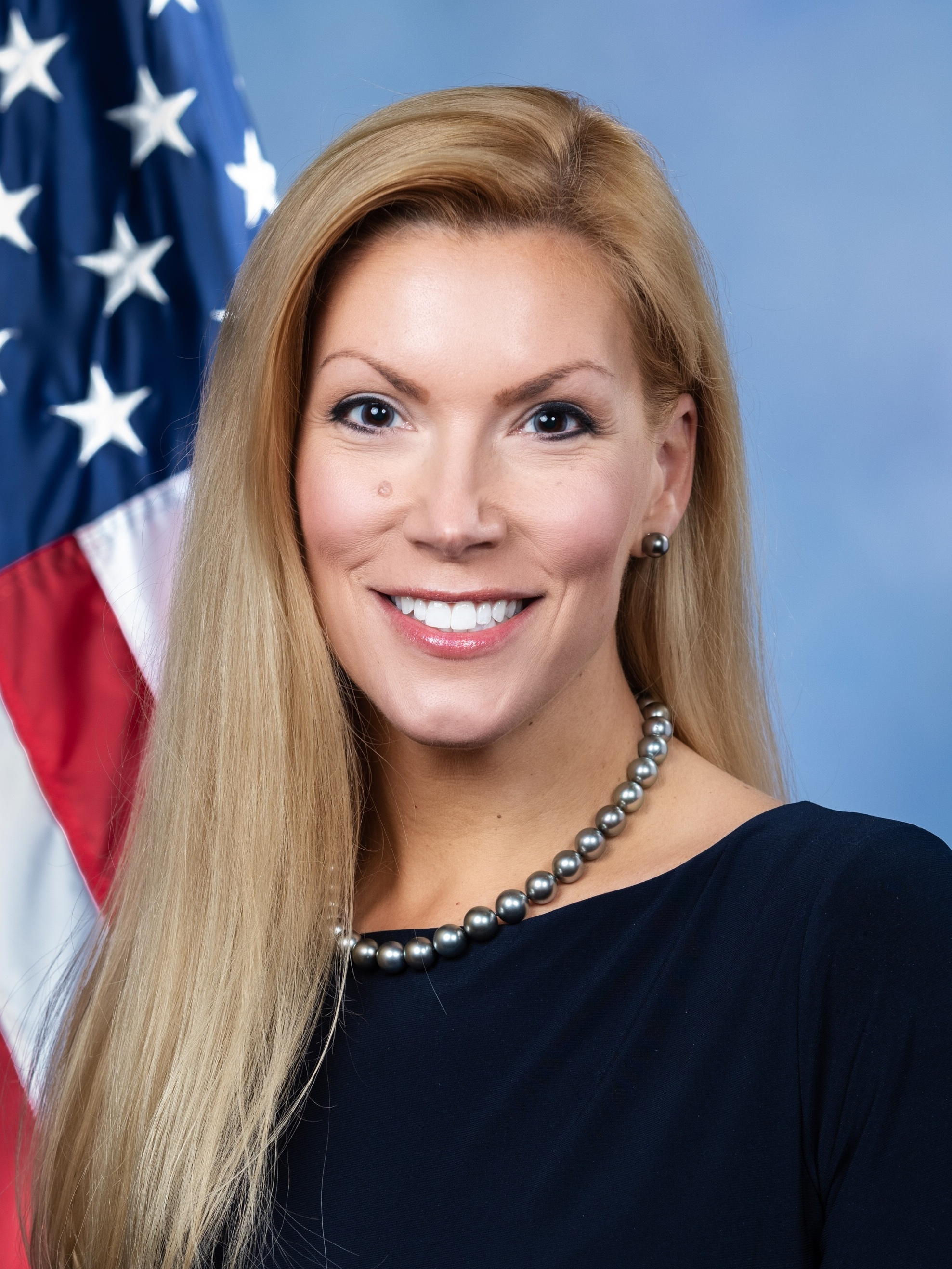

Nominee	Beth Van Duyne	Sam Eppler
Party	Republican	Democratic
Popular vote	227,108	149,518
Percentage	60.3%	39.7%
- Van Duyne: 50–60% 60–70% 70–80% 80–90% >90% Eppler: 50–60% 60–70% Tie: 50% No votes
U.S. Representative before election
Beth Van Duyne
Republican
Elected U.S. Representative
Beth Van Duyne
Republican

The 24th district encompasses the suburbs north of Fort Worth and Dallas, including Grapevine, Bedford, and Park Cities. The incumbent was Republican Beth Van Duyne, who was re-elected with 59.75% of the vote in 2022.

=== Republican primary ===
==== Nominee ====
- Beth Van Duyne, incumbent U.S. representative

==== Endorsements ====
Beth Van Duyne

Executive branch officials

- Donald Trump, 45th president of the United States

Organizations

- AIPAC
- International Franchise Association
- Maggie's List
- National Rifle Association Political Victory Fund
- Texas Alliance for Life
- Texas Medical Association PAC

==== Fundraising ====
Campaign finance reports as of February 14, 2024
Candidate	Raised	Spent	Cash on hand
Beth Van Duyne (R)	$1,898,754	$913,724	$2,084,816
Source: Federal Election Commission

==== Results ====
Republican primary results
Party	Candidate	Votes	%
Republican	Beth Van Duyne (incumbent)	75,982	100.0
Total votes		75,982	100.0

=== Democratic primary ===
==== Nominee ====
- Sam Eppler, high school principal

==== Eliminated in primary ====
- Francine Ly, court system manager and former legislative aide

==== Withdrawn ====
- Sandeep Srivastava, realtor and nominee for the 3rd district in 2022 (ran in the 3rd district)

==== Endorsements ====
Sam Eppler

Newspapers

- The Dallas Morning News
Francine Ly

Organizations

- Emgage PAC

Labor unions

- Texas AFL-CIO
- United Auto Workers

==== Fundraising ====
Campaign finance reports as of February 14, 2024
Candidate	Raised	Spent	Cash on hand
Sam Eppler (D)	$344,321	$292,848	$51,473
Francine Ly (D)	$66,344	$65,108	$1,235
Source: Federal Election Commission

==== Results ====
Democratic primary results
Party	Candidate	Votes	%
Democratic	Sam Eppler	17,451	58.6
Democratic	Francine Ly	12,314	41.4
Total votes		29,765	100.0

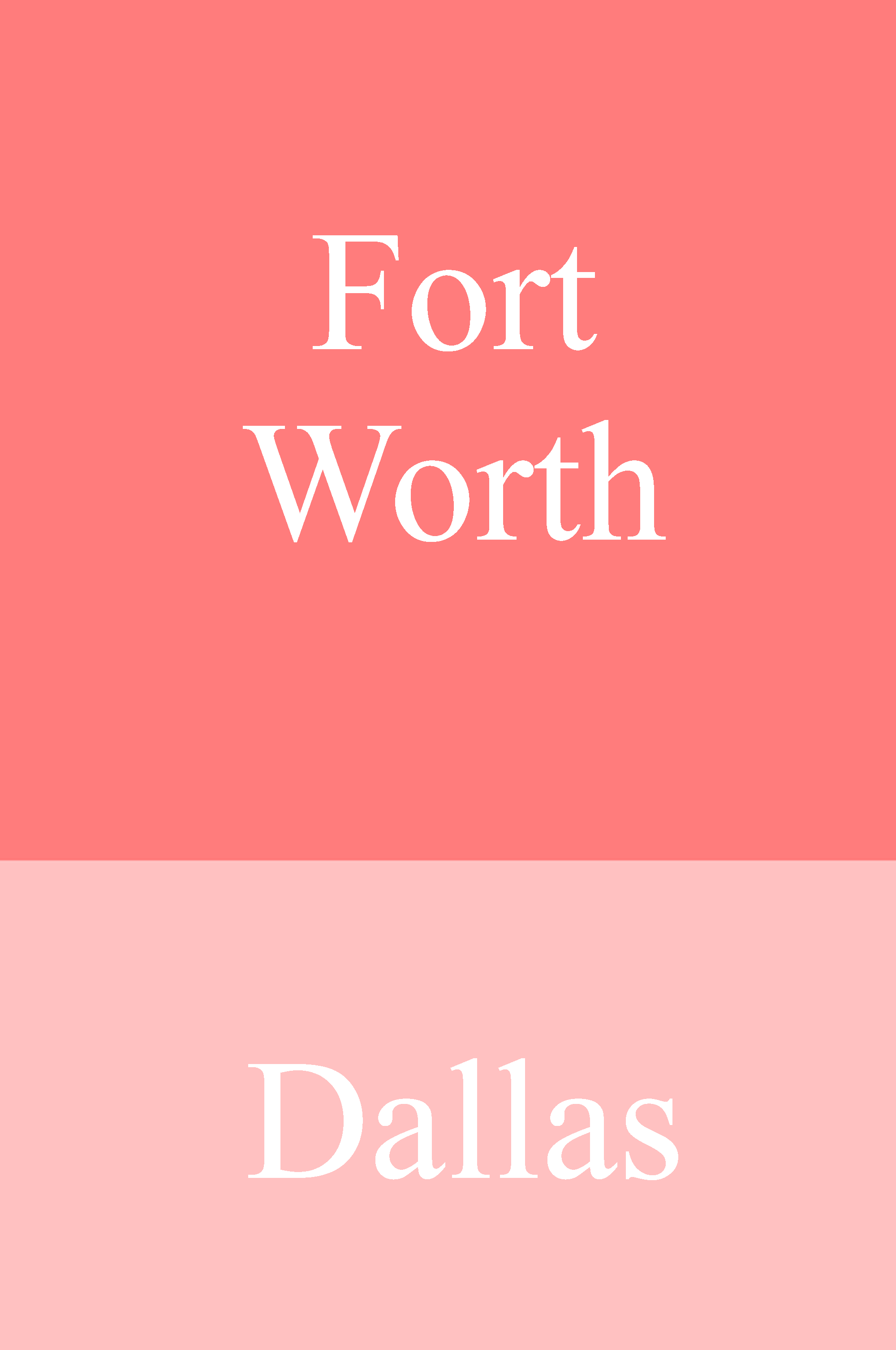
Cartogram of Texas' 24th congressional district

=== General election ===
==== Predictions ====
Source	Ranking	As of
The Cook Political Report	Solid R	February 2, 2023
Inside Elections	Solid R	March 10, 2023
Sabato's Crystal Ball	Safe R	February 23, 2023
Elections Daily	Safe R	September 7, 2023
CNalysis	Solid R	November 16, 2023
Decision Desk HQ	Safe R	June 14, 2024

==== Endorsements ====
Sam Eppler

Newspapers

- The Dallas Morning News

==== Results ====
2024 Texas's 24th congressional district election
Party	Candidate	Votes	%
Republican	Beth Van Duyne (incumbent)	227,108	60.30
Democratic	Sam Eppler	149,518	39.70
Total votes		376,626	100.00
Republican hold			

==== By county ====
County	Beth Van Duyne Republican		Sam Eppler Democratic		Margin		Total votes cast
County	#	%	#	%	#	%	Total votes cast
Dallas	76,477	56.06%	59,938	43.94%	16,539	12.12%	136,415
Tarrant	150,631	62.71%	89,580	37.29%	61,051	25.42%	240,211
Totals	227,108	60.30%	149,518	39.70%	77,590	20.60%	376,626

== District 25 ==
2024 Texas's 25th congressional district election
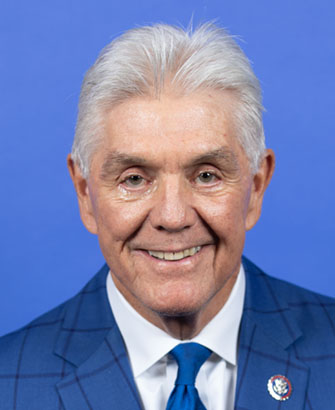
Nominee	Roger Williams
Party	Republican
Popular vote	263,042
Percentage	99.4%
U.S. Representative before election
Roger Williams
Republican
Elected U.S. Representative
Roger Williams
Republican

The 25th district runs from Arlington out to rural exurbs of southern Fort Worth such as Granbury. The incumbent was Republican Roger Williams, who was re-elected unopposed in 2022.

=== Republican primary ===
==== Nominee ====
- Roger Williams, incumbent U.S. representative

==== Eliminated in primary ====
- Vince Crabb, retired U.S. Army colonel
- Matthew Lucci, tech executive and mechanical engineering professor

==== Endorsements ====
Matthew Lucci

Organizations

- Republicans for National Renewal
Roger Williams

Executive branch officials

- Donald Trump, 45th president of the United States

Organizations

- AIPAC
- National Rifle Association Political Victory Fund
- Texas Alliance for Life
- Texas Medical Association PAC

==== Fundraising ====
Campaign finance reports as of February 14, 2024
Candidate	Raised	Spent	Cash on hand
Vince Crabb (R)	$61,753 (Note: $53,772 of this total was self-funded by Crabb)	$54,929	$6,823
Matthew Lucci (R)	$34,042 (Note: $3,300 of this total was self-funded by Lucci)	$33,652	$115
Roger Williams (R)	$1,265,190	$999,121	$636,231
Source: Federal Election Commission

==== Results ====
Republican primary results
Party	Candidate	Votes	%
Republican	Roger Williams (incumbent)	66,345	78.0
Republican	Matthew Lucci	11,929	14.0
Republican	Vince Crabb	6,738	7.9
Total votes		85,012	100.0

=== General election ===
==== Predictions ====
Source	Ranking	As of
The Cook Political Report	Solid R	February 2, 2023
Inside Elections	Solid R	March 10, 2023
Sabato's Crystal Ball	Safe R	February 23, 2023
Elections Daily	Safe R	September 7, 2023
CNalysis	Solid R	November 16, 2023
Decision Desk HQ	Safe R	June 14, 2024

==== Results ====
2024 Texas's 25th congressional district election
Party	Candidate	Votes	%
Republican	Roger Williams (incumbent)	263,042	99.4
Write-in		1,661	0.6
Total votes		264,703	100.0
Republican hold			

==== By county ====
County	Roger Williams Republican		Various candidates Other parties		Margin		Total votes cast
County	#	%	#	%	#	%	Total votes cast
Callahan	5,687	99.77%	15	0.23%	5,674	99.54%	5,700
Comanche	5,492	99.78%	12	0.22%	5,480	99.56%	5,504
Eastland	7,474	98.95%	79	1.05%	7,395	97.91%	7,553
Erath	15,301	99.86%	22	0.14%	15,279	99.71%	15,323
Hood	32,051	99.71%	93	0.29%	32,044	99.69%	32,144
Jack	3,883	99.82%	7	0.18%	3,876	99.64%	3,890
Johnson	48,649	99.75%	123	0.25%	48,526	99.50%	48,772
Palo Pinto	11,854	99.78%	26	0.22%	11,828	99.56%	11,880
Parker	20,032	99.81%	38	0.19%	19,994	99.62%	20,070
Somervell	4,659	98.27%	82	1.73%	4,577	96.54%	4,741
Stephens	3,273	100.00%	0	0.00%	3,273	100.00%	3,273
Tarrant	97,175	98.87%	1,109	1.13%	96,066	97.74%	98,284
Young	7,512	99.25%	57	0.75%	7,455	98.49%	7,569
Total	263,042	99.37%	1,661	0.63%	261,381	98.75%	264,703

== District 26 ==
2024 Texas's 26th congressional district election
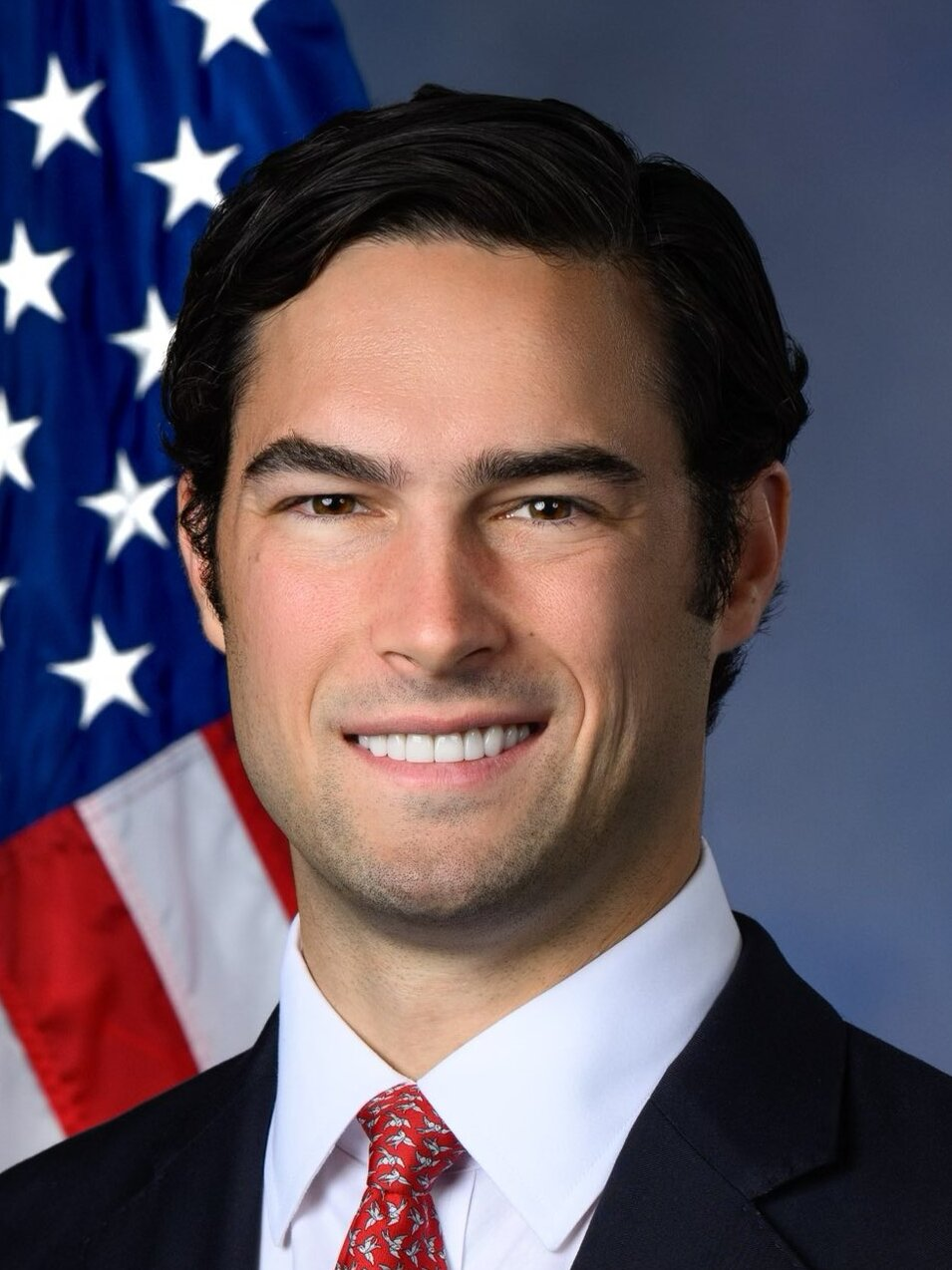

Nominee	Brandon Gill	Ernest Lineberger
Party	Republican	Democratic
Popular vote	241,096	138,558
Percentage	62.1%	35.7%
- Gill: 40–50% 50–60% 60–70% 70–80% 80–90% >90% Lineberger: 40–50% 50–60% 60–70% 70–80% No votes
U.S. Representative before election
Michael Burgess
Republican
Elected U.S. Representative
Brandon Gill
Republican

The 26th district is based in the northern portion of the Dallas–Fort Worth metroplex, centering on eastern Denton County and including Cooke County, part of Wise County and a very small portion of Tarrant County. The incumbent was Republican Michael Burgess, who was re-elected with 69.29% of the vote in 2022 against a Libertarian candidate. Burgess chose to retire.

=== Republican primary ===
==== Nominee ====
- Brandon Gill, conservative news website founder and son-in-law of author Dinesh D'Souza

==== Eliminated in primary ====
- Scott Armey, former Denton County judge, son of former U.S. Representative Dick Armey, and candidate for this district in 2002
- Neena Biswas, physician and former Coppell Independent School District trustee
- Vlad de Franceschi, attorney
- John Huffman, mayor of Southlake
- Jason Kergosien, tech entrepreneur
- Joel Krause, software developer and candidate for this district in 2014 and 2016
- Doug Robison, retired district judge
- Luisa del Rosal, maintenance business owner and former chief of staff to U.S. Representative Tony Gonzales
- Mark Rutledge, mechanical contractor
- Burt Thakur, engineering project manager and candidate for California's 25th congressional district in 2022

==== Declined ====
- Ben Bumgarner, state representative from the 63rd district (ran for re-election)
- Michael Burgess, incumbent U.S. representative
- Armin Mizani, mayor of Keller
- Tan Parker, state senator from the 12th district

==== Endorsements ====
Scott Armey

U.S. senators

- Phil Gramm, former U.S. senator from Texas (1985–2002)

U.S. representatives

- Dick Armey, former U.S. representative from this district (1985–2003) (candidate's father)

Newspapers

- Fort Worth Star-Telegram
Luisa del Rosal

Newspapers

- The Dallas Morning News (Republican primary only)
Brandon Gill

U.S presidents

- Donald Trump, former president of the United States

U.S. senators

- Ted Cruz, U.S. senator from Texas (2013–present)

U.S. representatives

- Lauren Boebert, U.S. representative from Colorado's 3rd congressional district (2021–present)
- Lance Gooden, U.S. representative from Texas's 5th congressional district (2019–present)
- Ronny Jackson, U.S. representative from Texas's 13th congressional district (2021–present)
- Jim Jordan, U.S. representative from Ohio's 4th congressional district (2007–present)
- Troy Nehls, U.S. representative from Texas's 22nd congressional district (2021–present)
- Marjorie Taylor Greene, U.S. representative from Georgia's 14th congressional district (2021–present)

Organizations

- AIPAC
- Club for Growth PAC
- House Freedom Fund
- National Right to Life Committee
- Republicans for National Renewal
John Huffman

U.S. executive branch officials

- Rick Perry, former United States Secretary of Energy (2017–2019)

U.S. representatives

- Beth Van Duyne, U.S. representative from Texas's 24th congressional district (2021–present)

==== Fundraising ====
Campaign finance reports as of February 14, 2024
Candidate	Raised	Spent	Cash on hand
Scott Armey (R)	$281,855 (Note: $130,000 of this total was self-funded by Armey)	$187,560	$94,294
Neena Biswas (R)	$28,947 (Note: $28,947 of this total was self-funded by Biswas)	$28,122	$825
Vlad de Franceschi (R)	$34,104 (Note: $25,000 of this total was self-funded by de Franceschi)	$15,156	$18,948
Brandon Gill (R)	$687,765 (Note: $250,000 of this total was self-funded by Gill)	$390,102	$297,662
John Huffman (R)	$387,084 (Note: $80,000 of this total was self-funded by Huffman)	$316,589	$70,494
Jason Kergosien (R)	$4,255 (Note: $3,921 of this total was self-funded by Kergosien)	$0	$745
Doug Robinson (R)	$257,495 (Note: $235,000 of this total was self-funded by Robinson)	$202,060	$55,434
Luisa del Rosal (R)	$262,415	$163,660	$98,754
Burt Thakur (R)	$74,456	$63,306	$11,149
Source: Federal Election Commission

==== Results ====
Republican primary results
Party	Candidate	Votes	%
Republican	Brandon Gill	49,876	58.4
Republican	Scott Armey	12,400	14.5
Republican	John Huffman	8,559	10.0
Republican	Luisa del Rosal	3,949	4.6
Republican	Doug Robison	2,999	3.5
Republican	Mark Rutledge	2,130	2.5
Republican	Joel Krause	1,959	2.3
Republican	Neena Biswas	1,665	1.9
Republican	Burt Thakur	975	1.1
Republican	Vlad de Franceschi	572	0.7
Republican	Jason Kergosien	366	0.4
Total votes		85,450	100.0

=== Democratic primary ===
==== Nominee ====
- Ernest Lineberger, industrial engineer

==== Endorsements ====
Ernest Lineberger

Labor unions

- Texas AFL-CIO
- United Auto Workers

==== Fundraising ====
Campaign finance reports as of February 14, 2024
Candidate	Raised	Spent	Cash on hand
Ernest Lineberger (D)	$11,785 (Note: $7,302 of this total was self-funded by Lineberger)	$6,645	$5,139
Source: Federal Election Commission

==== Results ====
Democratic primary results
Party	Candidate	Votes	%
Democratic	Ernest Lineberger	18,308	100.0
Total votes		18,308	100.0

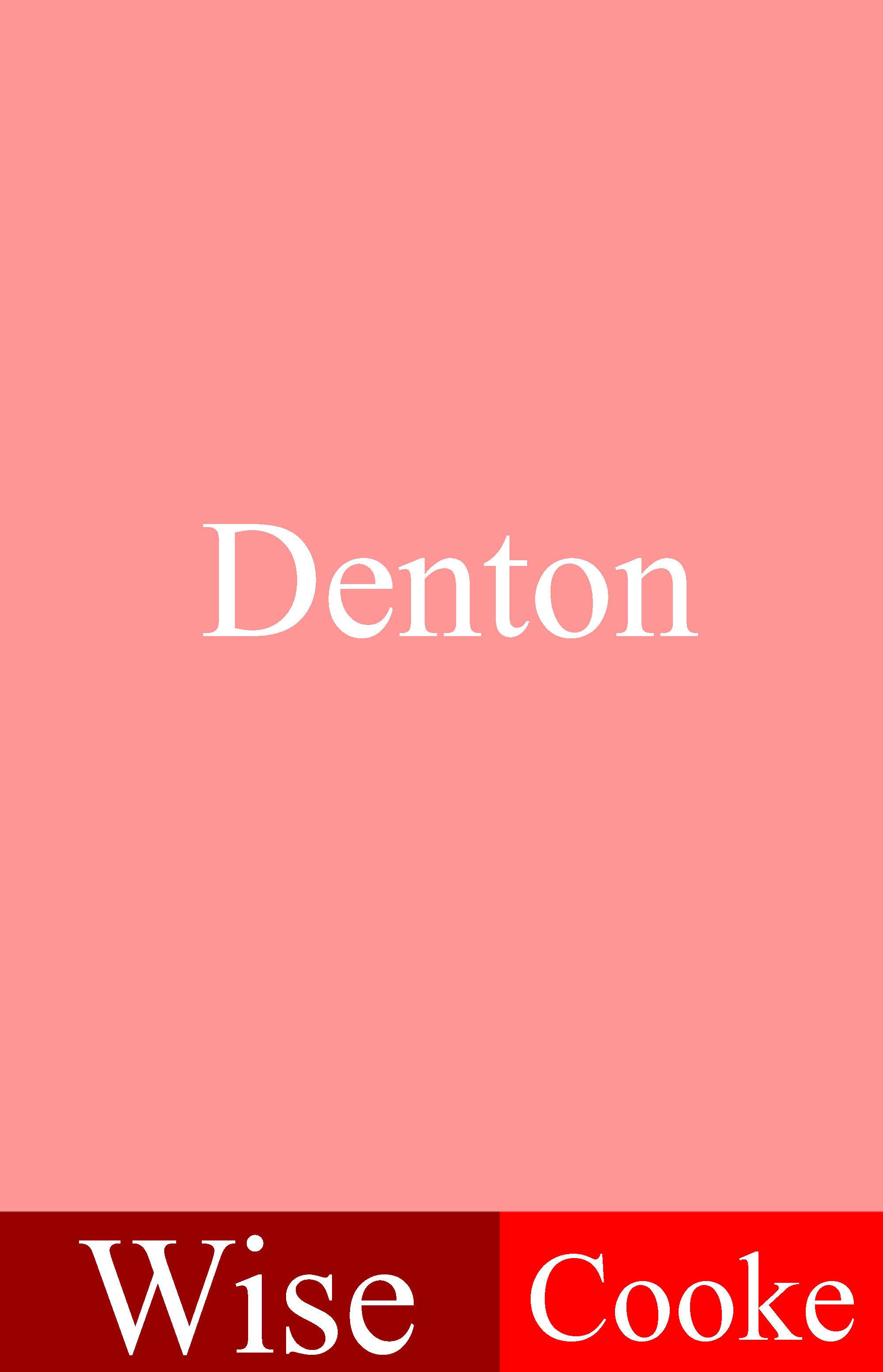
Cartogram of Texas' 26th congressional district

=== General election ===
==== Predictions ====
Source	Ranking	As of
The Cook Political Report	Solid R	February 2, 2023
Inside Elections	Solid R	March 10, 2023
Sabato's Crystal Ball	Safe R	February 23, 2023
Elections Daily	Safe R	September 7, 2023
CNalysis	Solid R	November 16, 2023
Decision Desk HQ	Safe R	June 14, 2024

==== Endorsements ====
Ernest Lineberger

Newspapers

- The Dallas Morning News

==== Results ====
2024 Texas's 26th congressional district election
Party	Candidate	Votes	%
Republican	Brandon Gill	241,096	62.07
Democratic	Ernest Lineberger	138,558	35.67
Libertarian	Phil Gray	8,773	2.26
Total votes		388,427	100.00
Republican hold			

==== By county ====
County	Brandon Gill Republican		Ernest Lineberger Democratic		Phil Gray Libertarian		Margin		Total votes cast
County	#	%	#	%	#	%	#	%	Total votes cast
Cooke	16,606	83.76%	2,848	14.36%	372	1.88%	13,758	69.39%	19,826
Denton	202,850	59.17%	132,127	38.54%	7,865	2.29%	70,723	20.63%	342,842
Tarrant	3	100.00%	0	0.00%	0	0.00%	3	100.00%	3
Wise	21,637	84.01%	3,583	13.91%	536	2.08%	18,054	70.10%	25,756
Totals	241,096	62.07%	138,558	35.67%	8,773	2.26%	26.40	25.79%	388,427

== District 27 ==
2024 Texas's 27th congressional district election
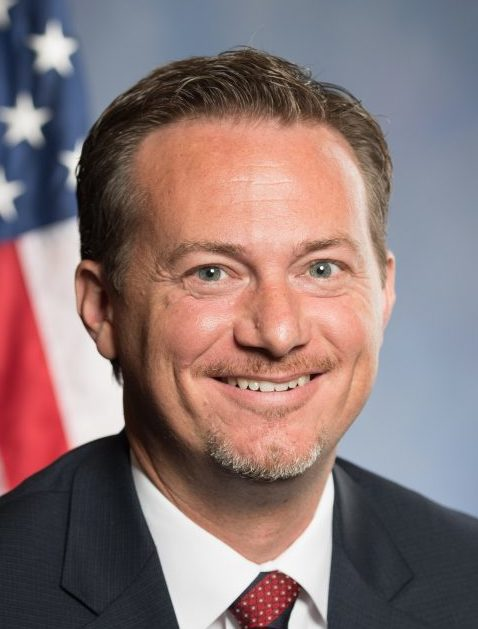

Nominee	Michael Cloud	Tanya Lloyd
Party	Republican	Democratic
Popular vote	183,980	94,596
Percentage	66.0%	34.0%
- Cloud: 50–60% 60–70% 70–80% 80–90% >90% Lloyd: 50–60% 60–70% 70–80% No votes
U.S. Representative before election
Michael Cloud
Republican
Elected U.S. Representative
Michael Cloud
Republican

The 27th district stretches across the Coastal Bend, from Corpus Christi up to Bay City. The incumbent was Republican Michael Cloud, who was re-elected with 64.44% of the vote in 2022.

=== Republican primary ===
==== Nominee ====
- Michael Cloud, incumbent U.S. representative

==== Eliminated in primary ====
- Luis Espindola, defense contractor
- Scott Mandell, businessman
- Chris Mapp, marine manufacturer

==== Endorsements ====
Michael Cloud

Organizations

- AIPAC
- National Rifle Association Political Victory Fund
- Texas Alliance for Life
- Texas Medical Association PAC
- Turning Point Action

==== Fundraising ====
Campaign finance reports as of February 14, 2024
Candidate	Raised	Spent	Cash on hand
Michael Cloud (R)	$374,168	$317,271	$338,383
Luis Espindola (R)	$16,793	$11,888	$4,905
Scott Mandell (R) (Note: Did not file for pre-primary deadline)	$15,000	$0	$15,000
Source: Federal Election Commission

==== Results ====
Republican primary results
Party	Candidate	Votes	%
Republican	Michael Cloud (incumbent)	53,304	74.6
Republican	Scott Mandell	10,791	15.1
Republican	Luis Espindola	3,838	5.4
Republican	Chris Mapp	3,553	5.0
Total votes		71,486	100.0

=== Democratic primary ===
==== Nominee ====
- Tanya Lloyd, teacher

==== Eliminated in primary ====
- Anthony Tristan, financial consultant, tax preparer, and candidate for this district in 2022

==== Fundraising ====
Campaign finance reports as of February 14, 2024
Candidate	Raised	Spent	Cash on hand
Anthony Tristan (D)	$4,155 (Note: $3,878 of this total was self-funded by Tristan)	$4,046	$119
Source: Federal Election Commission

==== Results ====
Democratic primary results
Party	Candidate	Votes	%
Democratic	Tanya Lloyd	10,305	53.3
Democratic	AJ Tristan	9,013	46.7
Total votes		19,318	100.0

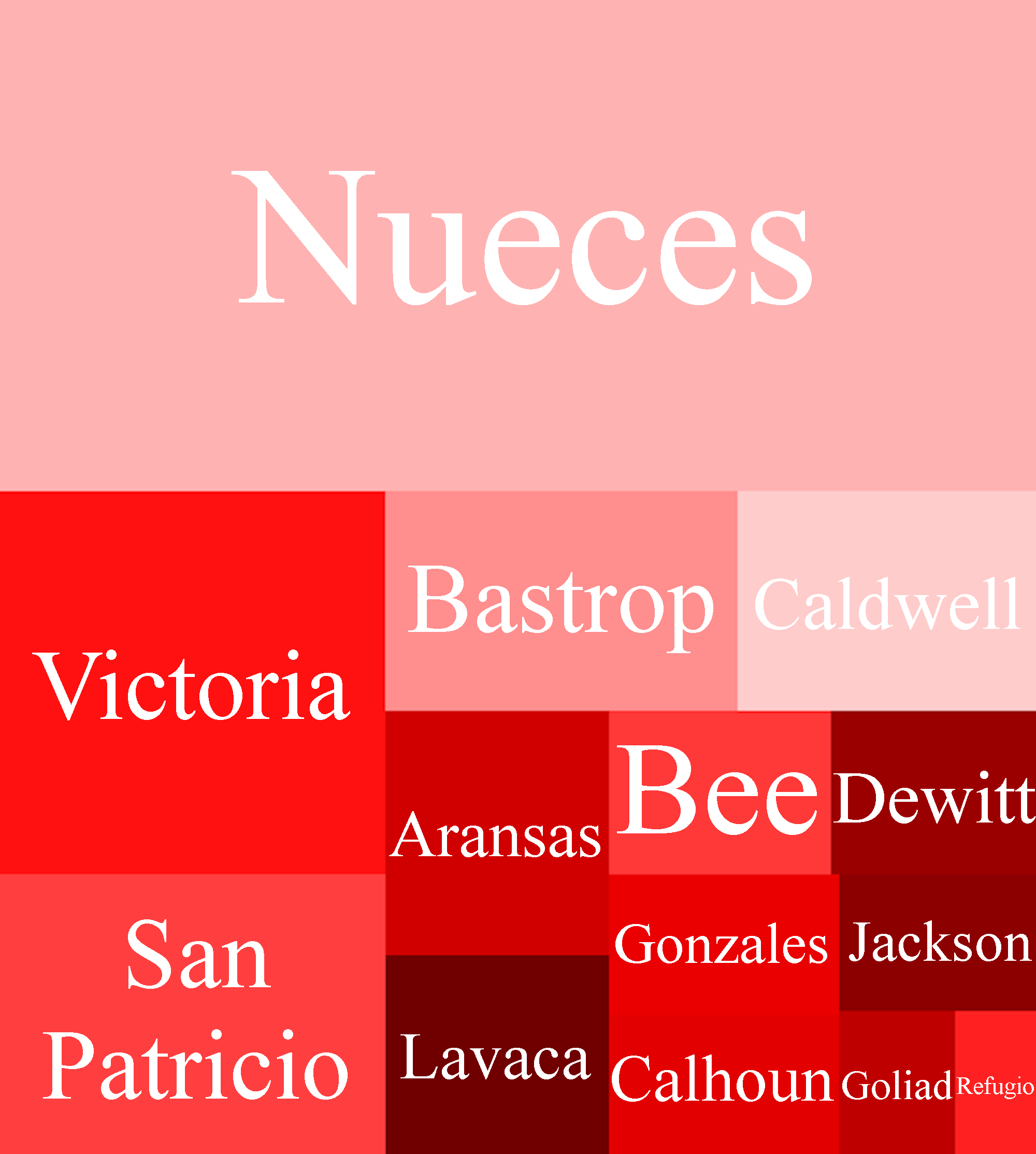
Cartogram of Texas' 27th congressional district

=== General election ===
==== Predictions ====
Source	Ranking	As of
The Cook Political Report	Solid R	February 2, 2023
Inside Elections	Solid R	March 10, 2023
Sabato's Crystal Ball	Safe R	February 23, 2023
Elections Daily	Safe R	September 7, 2023
CNalysis	Solid R	November 16, 2023
Decision Desk HQ	Safe R	June 14, 2024

==== Results ====
2024 Texas's 27th congressional district election
Party	Candidate	Votes	%
Republican	Michael Cloud (incumbent)	183,980	66.04
Democratic	Tanya Lloyd	94,596	33.96
Total votes		278,576	100.00
Republican hold			

==== By county ====
County	Michael Cloud Republican		Tanya Lloyd Democratic		Margin		Total votes cast
County	#	%	#	%	#	%	Total votes cast
Aransas	10,155	79.58%	2,605	20.42%	7,550	59.17%	12,760
Bastrop	11,052	61.08%	7,041	38.92%	4,011	22.17%	18,093
Bee	5,890	69.38%	2,600	30.62%	3,290	15,219%	8,490
Caldwell	8,359	54.92%	6,860	45.08%	1,499	9.85%	15,219
Calhoun	5,866	77.06%	1,746	22.94%	4,120	54.13%	7,612
DeWitt	6,523	84.64%	1,184	15.36%	5,339	69.27%	7,707
Goliad	3,126	81.17%	725	18.83%	2,401	62.35%	3,851
Gonzales	5,836	78.82%	1,568	21.18%	4,268	57.64%	7,404
Jackson	5,398	86.35%	853	13.65%	4,545	72.71%	6,251
Lavaca	9,106	88.88%	1,139	11.12%	7,967	77.76%	10,245
Nueces	68,128	57.48%	50,388	42.52%	17,740	14.97%	118,516
Refugio	2,144	71.68%	847	28.32%	1,297	43.36%	2,991
San Patricio	17,176	68.79%	7,793	31.21%	9,383	37.58%	24,969
Victoria	25,221	73.17%	9,247	26.83%	15,974	46.34%	34,468
Totals	183,980	66.04%	94,596	33.96%	89,384	32.09%	278,576

== District 28 ==
2024 Texas's 28th congressional district election
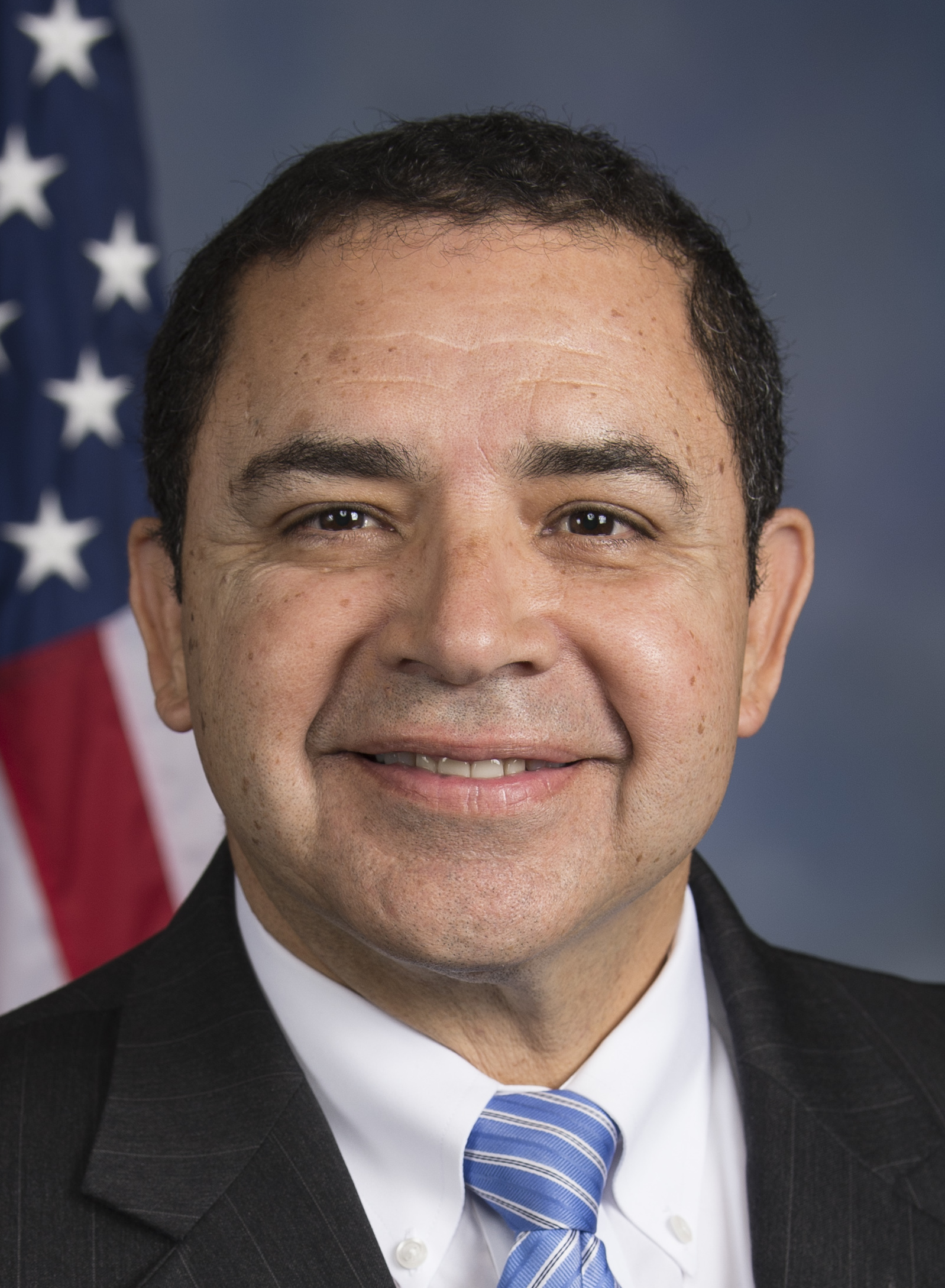

Nominee	Henry Cuellar	Jay Furman
Party	Democratic	Republican
Popular vote	125,490	112,117
Percentage	52.8%	47.2%
- Cuellar: 50–60% 60–70% 70–80% 80–90% >90% Furman: 50–60% 60–70% 70–80% 80–90% >90% No votes
U.S. Representative before election
Henry Cuellar
Democratic
Elected U.S. Representative
Henry Cuellar
Democratic

The 28th district is based in the Laredo area and stretches north of the Rio Grande Valley into east San Antonio. The incumbent was Democrat Henry Cuellar, who was re-elected with 56.65% of the vote in 2022.

=== Democratic primary ===
==== Nominee ====
- Henry Cuellar, incumbent U.S. representative

==== Endorsements ====
Henry Cuellar

U.S. representatives

- Pete Aguilar, U.S. representative for California's 33rd congressional district
- Katherine Clark, U.S. representative for Massachusetts's 5th congressional district
- Jim Clyburn, U.S. representative for South Carolina's 6th congressional district
- Steny Hoyer, U.S. representative for Maryland's 5th congressional district
- Hakeem Jeffries, U.S. representative for New York's 8th congressional district
- Nancy Pelosi, U.S. representative for California's 11th congressional district

Organizations

- AIPAC
- BIPAC
- Congressional Hispanic Caucus BOLD PAC
- International Franchise Association
- Pro-Israel America
- Texas Medical Association PAC

Labor unions

- Deputy Sheriff’s Association of Bexar County

==== Fundraising ====
Campaign finance reports as of February 14, 2024
Candidate	Raised	Spent	Cash on hand
Henry Cuellar (D)	$1,721,924	$1,420,75	$345,993
Source: Federal Election Commission

==== Results ====
Democratic primary results
Party	Candidate	Votes	%
Democratic	Henry Cuellar (incumbent)	35,550	100.0
Total votes		35,550	100.0

=== Republican primary ===
==== Nominee ====
- Jay Furman, physician

==== Eliminated in runoff ====
- Lazaro Garza Jr., rancher

==== Eliminated in primary ====
- Jimmy León, educator and nominee for the 9th district in 2022
- Jose Sanz, former district director for incumbent Henry Cuellar and former ESPN Mexico sports analyst

==== Withdrawn ====
- Kyle Sinclair, healthcare executive, U.S. Army veteran, and nominee for the 20th district in 2022

==== Fundraising ====
Campaign finance reports as of February 14, 2024
Candidate	Raised	Spent	Cash on hand
Jay Furman (R)	$178,245 (Note: $150,615 of this total was self-funded by Furman)	$138,071	$0
Lazaro Garza (R)	$241,975 (Note: $200,000 of this total was self-funded by Garza)	$81,792	$160,183
Jose Sanz (R)	$28,747	$12,821	$16,025
Source: Federal Election Commission

==== Results ====
Republican primary results
Party	Candidate	Votes	%
Republican	Jay Furman	12,036	44.8
Republican	Lazaro Garza Jr.	7,283	27.1
Republican	Jose Sanz	5,502	20.5
Republican	Jimmy León	2,021	7.5
Total votes		26,842	100.0

==== Primary runoff results ====
Republican primary results
Party	Candidate	Votes	%
Republican	Jay Furman	8,297	65.3
Republican	Lazaro Garza Jr.	4,410	34.7
Total votes		12,707	100.0

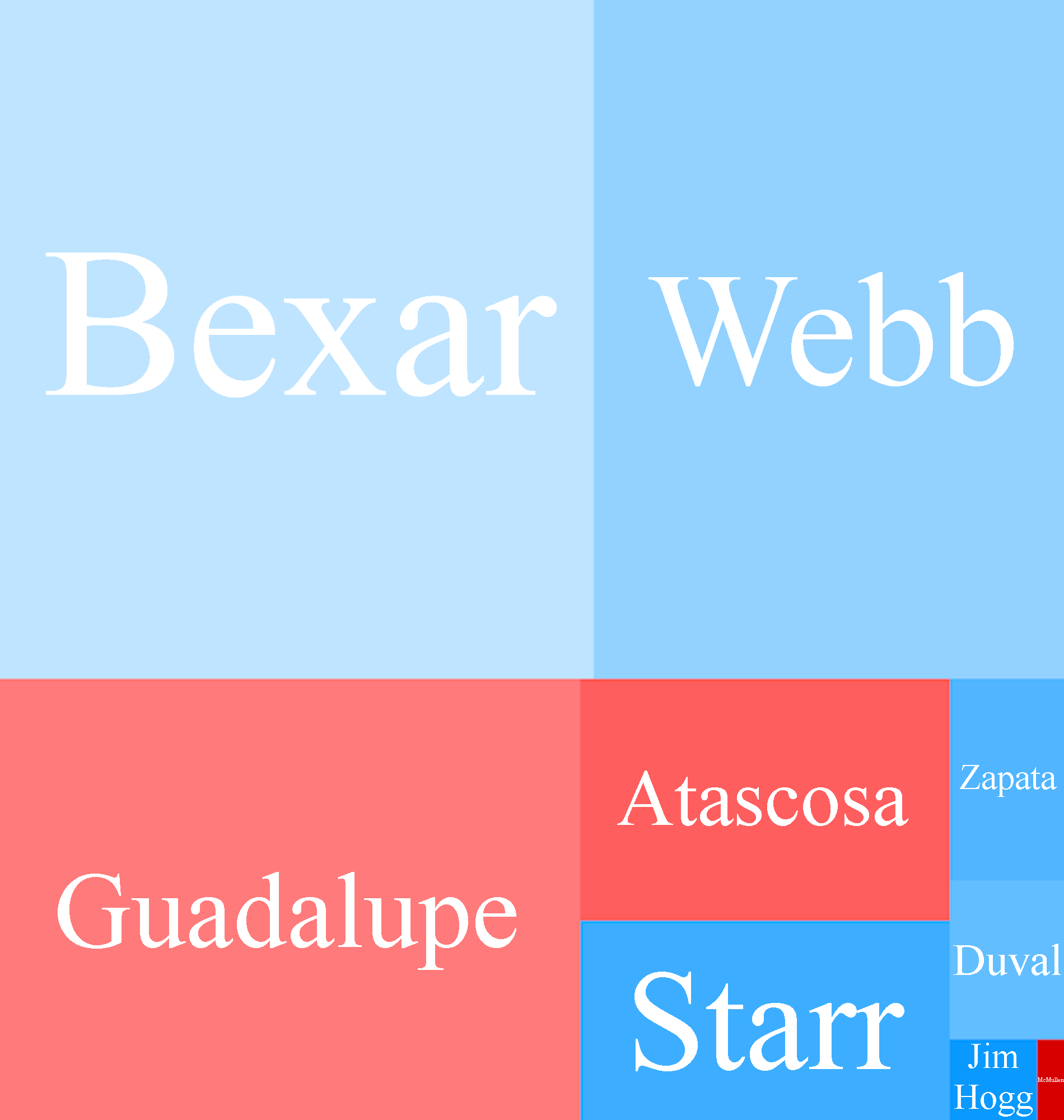
Cartogram of Texas' 28th congressional district

=== General election ===
==== Predictions ====
Source	Ranking	As of
The Cook Political Report	Likely D	September 6, 2024
Inside Elections	Likely D	April 24, 2024
Sabato's Crystal Ball	Lean D	May 7, 2024
Elections Daily	Likely D	September 7, 2023
CNalysis	Very Likely D	November 16, 2023
Decision Desk HQ	Likely D	June 14, 2024

==== Results ====
2024 Texas's 28th congressional district election
Party	Candidate	Votes	%
Democratic	Henry Cuellar (incumbent)	125,490	52.8%
Republican	Jay Furman	112,117	47.2%
Total votes		237,607	100.0%
Democratic hold			

==== By county ====
County	Henry Cuellar Democratic		Jay Furman Republican		Margin		Total votes cast
County	#	%	#	%	#	%	Total votes cast
Atascosa	6,115	34.33%	11,698	65.67%	−5,583	−31.34%	17,813
Bexar	45,211	56.33%	35,046	43.67%	10,165	38.87%	80,257
Duval	2,591	65.17%	1,385	34.83%	1,206	30.33%	3,976
Guadalupe	18,817	36.95%	32,107	63.05%	−13,290	−26.10%	50,924
Jim Hogg	1,099	73.96%	387	26.04%	712	47.91%	1,486
McMullen	97	20.95%	366	79.05%	−269	−58.10%	463
Starr	10,108	69.04%	4,532	30.96%	5,576	38.09%	14,640
Webb	38,385	60.47%	25,092	39.53%	13,293	20.94%	63,477
Zapata	3,067	67.10%	1,504	32.90%	1,563	34.19%	4,571
Totals	125,490	52.81%	112,117	47.19%	13,373	5.63%	237,607

== District 29 ==
2024 Texas's 29th congressional district election
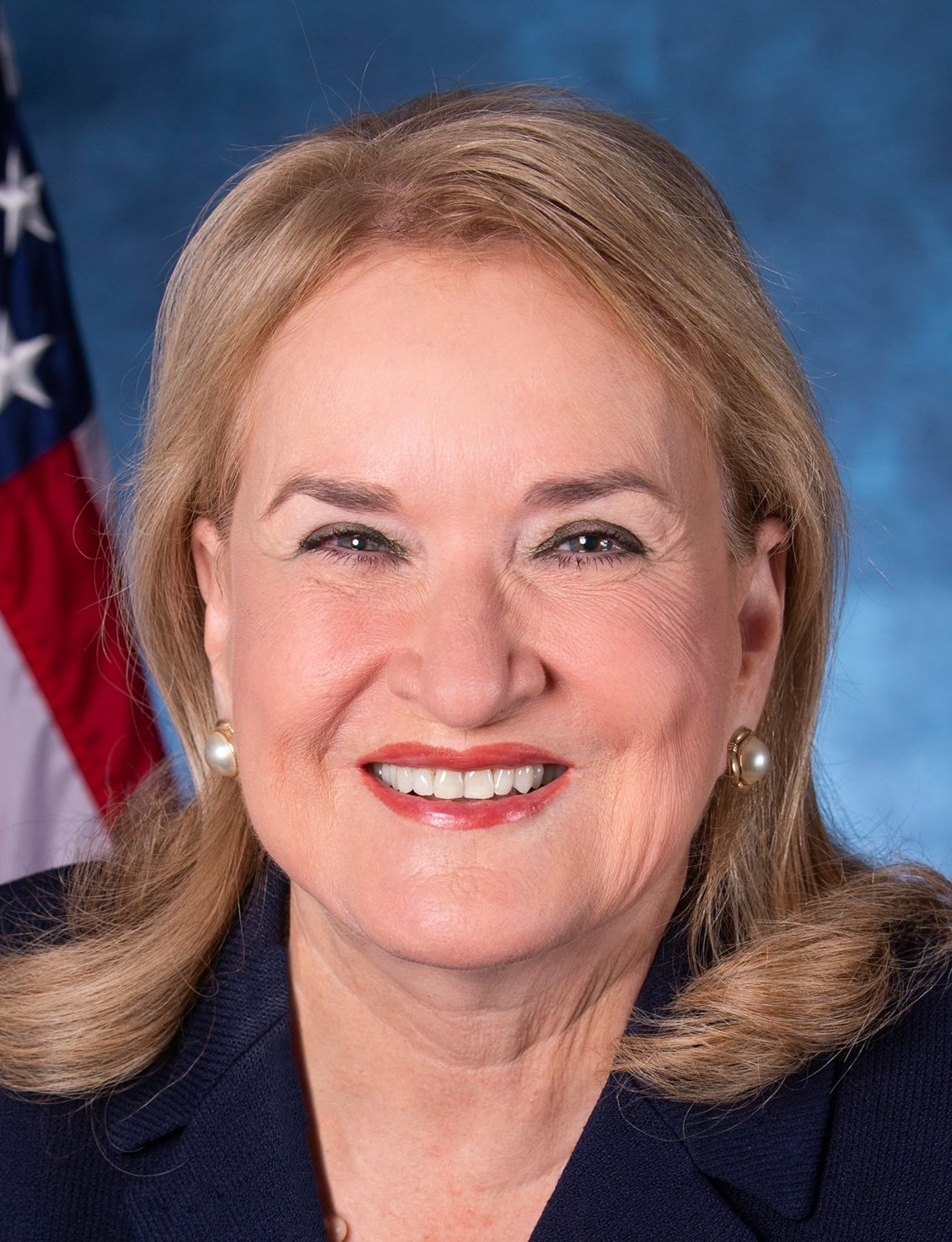

Nominee	Sylvia Garcia	Alan Garza
Party	Democratic	Republican
Popular vote	98,842	52,689
Percentage	65.2%	34.8%
- Garcia: 50–60% 60–70% 70–80% 80–90% >90% Garza: 50–60% 60–70% No votes
U.S. Representative before election
Sylvia Garcia
Democratic
Elected U.S. Representative
Sylvia Garcia
Democratic

The 29th district encompasses parts of northern and southeastern Houston, taking in the heavily Latino areas of the city. The incumbent was Democrat Sylvia Garcia, who was re-elected with 71.41% of the vote in 2022.

=== Democratic primary ===
==== Nominee ====
- Sylvia Garcia, incumbent U.S. representative

==== Endorsements ====
Sylvia Garcia

Organizations

- AIPAC
- Feminist Majority PAC
- Humane Society Legislative Fund
- League of Conservation Voters
- Planned Parenthood Action Fund
- Texas Medical Association PAC

Labor unions

- Texas AFL-CIO
- United Auto Workers
- United Farm Workers

==== Fundraising ====
Campaign finance reports as of February 14, 2024
Candidate	Raised	Spent	Cash on hand
Sylvia Garcia (D)	$485,703	$394,302	$475,872
Source: Federal Election Commission

==== Results ====
Democratic primary results
Party	Candidate	Votes	%
Democratic	Sylvia Garcia (incumbent)	17,297	100.0
Total votes		17,297	100.0

=== Republican primary ===
==== Nominee ====
- Alan Garza, attorney and engineer

==== Eliminated in runoff ====
- Christian Garcia, facilities assistant

==== Eliminated in primary ====
- Jose Casares, lead canvasser
- Angel Fierro, college student

==== Endorsements ====
Alan Garza

Newspapers

- Houston Chronicle

==== Fundraising ====
Campaign finance reports as of February 14, 2024
Candidate	Raised	Spent	Cash on hand
Angel Fierro (R)	$67	$67	$0
Alan Garza (R)	$12,036 (Note: $6,000 of this total was self-funded by Garza)	$10,666	$1,369
Source: Federal Election Commission

==== Results ====
Republican primary results
Party	Candidate	Votes	%
Republican	Christian Garcia	3,716	44.7
Republican	Alan Garza	2,418	29.1
Republican	Angel Fierro	1,346	16.2
Republican	Jose Casares	825	9.9
Total votes		8,305	100.0

==== Primary runoff results ====
Republican primary results
Party	Candidate	Votes	%
Republican	Alan Garza	421	53.8
Republican	Christian Garcia	362	46.2
Total votes		783	100.0

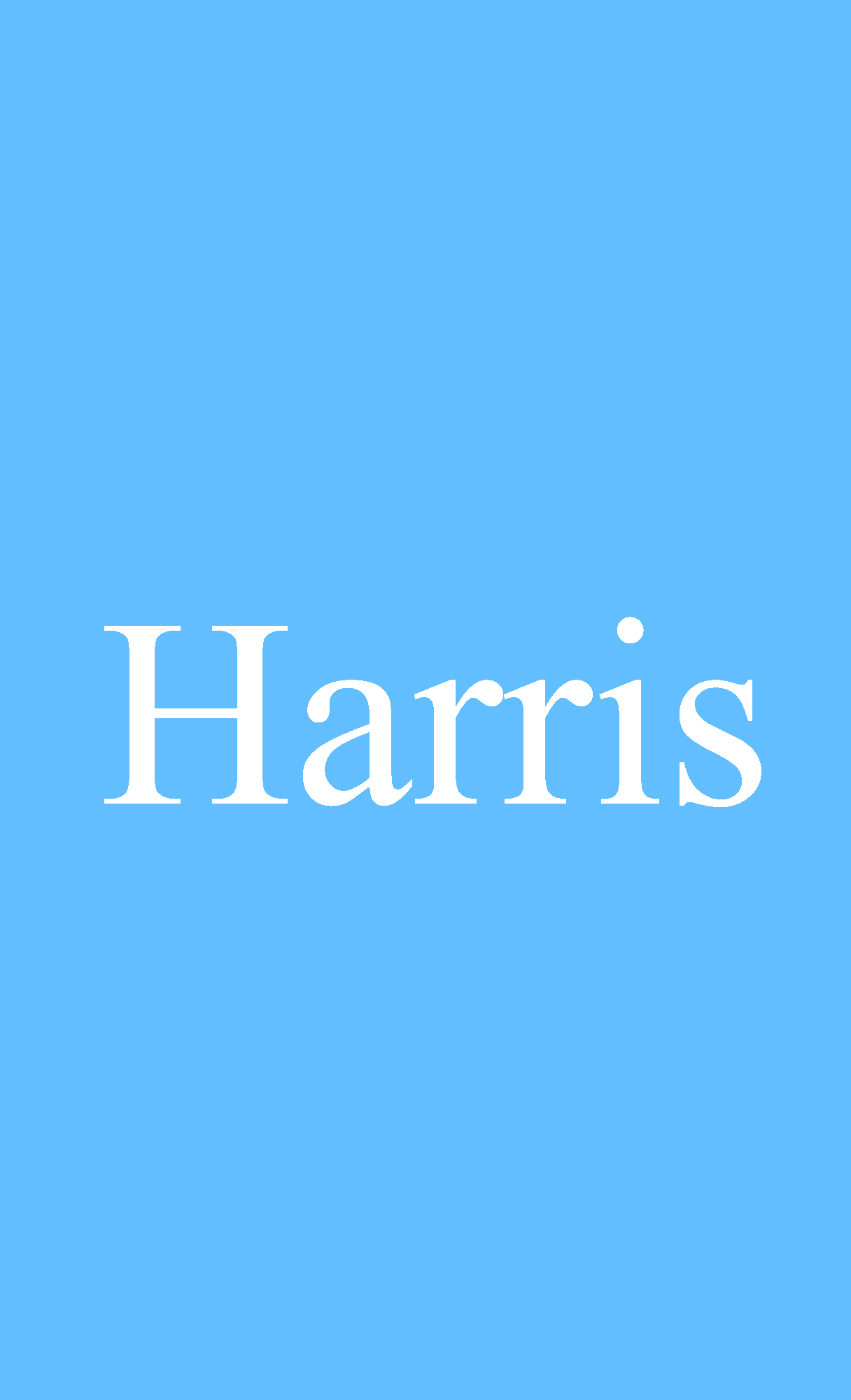
Cartogram of Texas' 29th congressional district

=== General election ===
==== Predictions ====
Source	Ranking	As of
The Cook Political Report	Solid D	February 2, 2023
Inside Elections	Solid D	March 10, 2023
Sabato's Crystal Ball	Safe D	February 23, 2023
Elections Daily	Safe D	September 7, 2023
CNalysis	Solid D	November 16, 2023
Decision Desk HQ	Safe D	June 14, 2024

==== Results ====
2024 Texas's 29th congressional district election
Party	Candidate	Votes	%
Democratic	Sylvia Garcia (incumbent)	98,842	65.2
Republican	Alan Garza	52,689	34.8
Total votes		151,531	100.0
Democratic hold			

==== By county ====
County	Sylvia Garcia Democratic		Alan Garza Republican		Margin		Total votes cast
County	#	%	#	%	#	%	Total votes cast
Harris	99,379	65.29%	52,830	34.71%	46,549	30.58%	152,209
Totals	99,379	65.29%	52,830	34.71%	46,549	30.58%	152,209

== District 30 ==
2024 Texas's 30th congressional district election
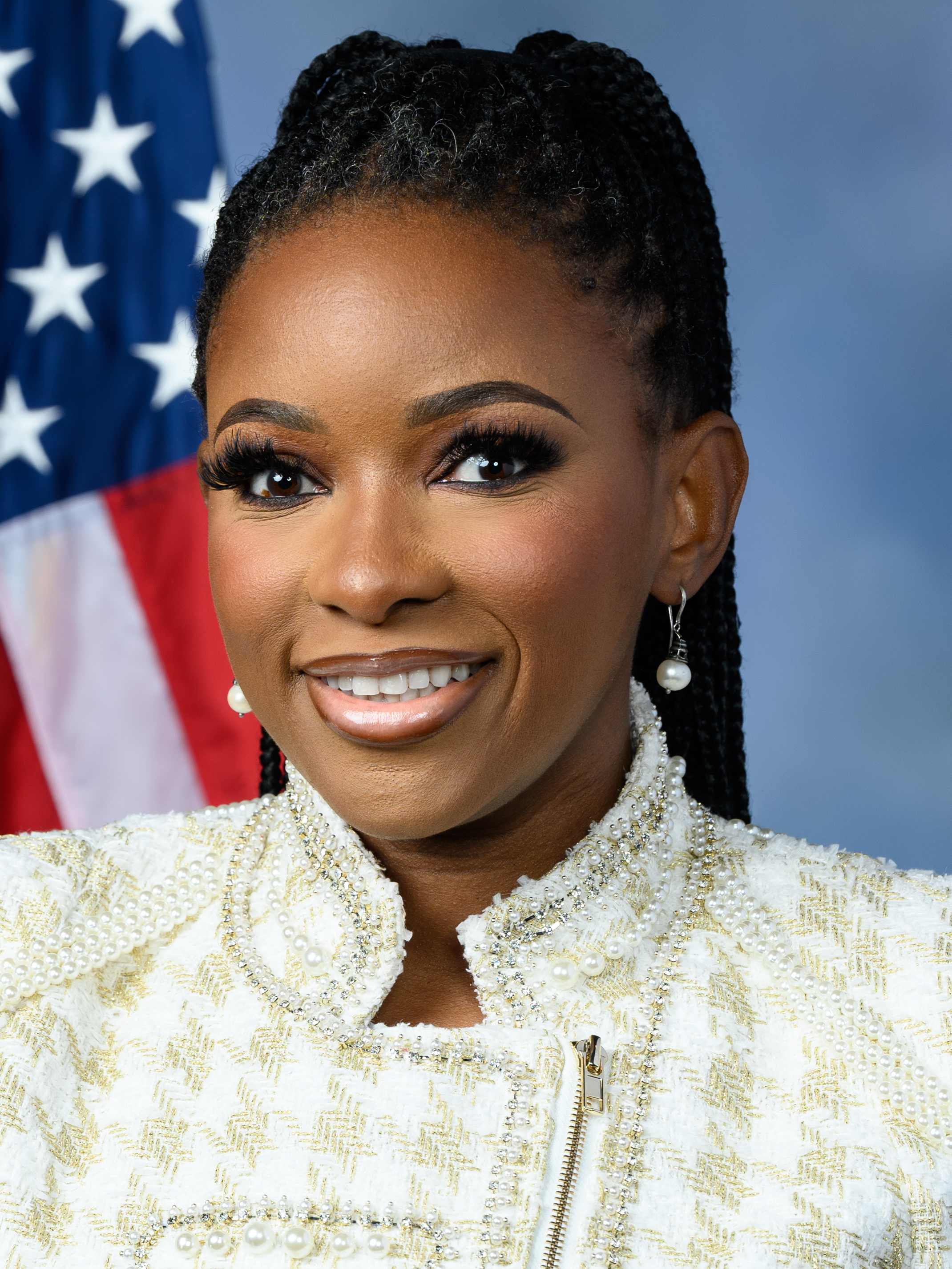

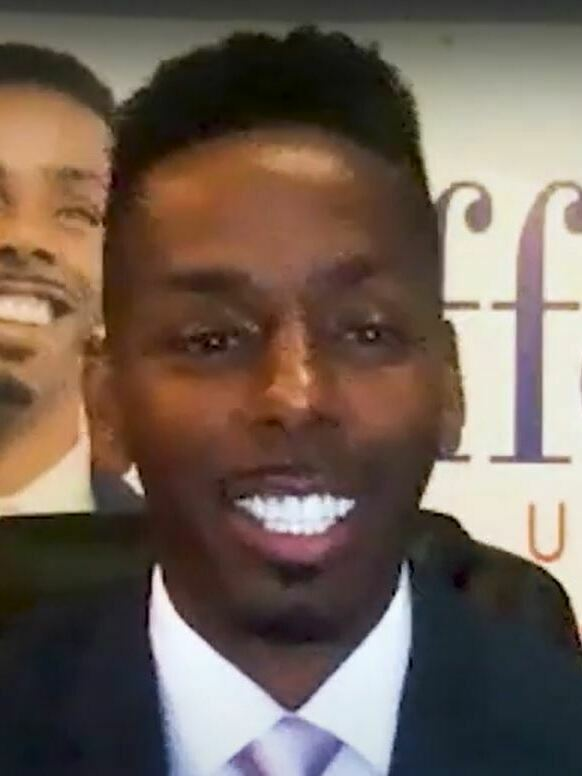
Nominee	Jasmine Crockett	Jrmar Jefferson
Party	Democratic	Libertarian
Popular vote	197,650	35,175
Percentage	84.9%	15.1%
- Precinct results Crockett: 60–70% 70–80% 80–90% >90% Jefferson: 50–60% No votes
U.S. Representative before election
Jasmine Crockett
Democratic
Elected U.S. Representative
Jasmine Crockett
Democratic

The 30th district encompasses Downtown Dallas and South Dallas. The incumbent was Democrat Jasmine Crockett, who was elected with 75.02% of the vote in 2022.

=== Democratic primary ===
==== Nominee ====
- Jasmine Crockett, incumbent U.S. representative

==== Eliminated in primary ====
- Jarred Davis, human resources worker

==== Endorsements ====
Jasmine Crockett

Organizations

- Humane Society Legislative Fund
- Jewish Democratic Council of America (post-primary)
- League of Conservation Voters
- NextGen America PAC (post-primary)
- Planned Parenthood Action Fund
- Population Connection Action Fund
- Texas Medical Association PAC
- Vote Common Good

Labor unions

- National Education Association
- Texas AFL-CIO
- Texas American Federation of Teachers
- United Auto Workers

==== Fundraising ====
Campaign finance reports as of February 14, 2024
Candidate	Raised	Spent	Cash on hand
Jasmine Crockett (D)	$878,260	$424,356	$606,754
Jarred Davis (D)	$5,609 (Note: $3,534 of this total was self-funded by Davis)	$3,534	$2,075
Jrmar Jefferson (D)	$0	$0	$0
Source: Federal Election Commission

==== Results ====
Democratic primary results
Party	Candidate	Votes	%
Democratic	Jasmine Crockett (incumbent)	43,059	91.5
Democratic	Jarred Davis	3,982	8.5
Total votes		47,041	100.0

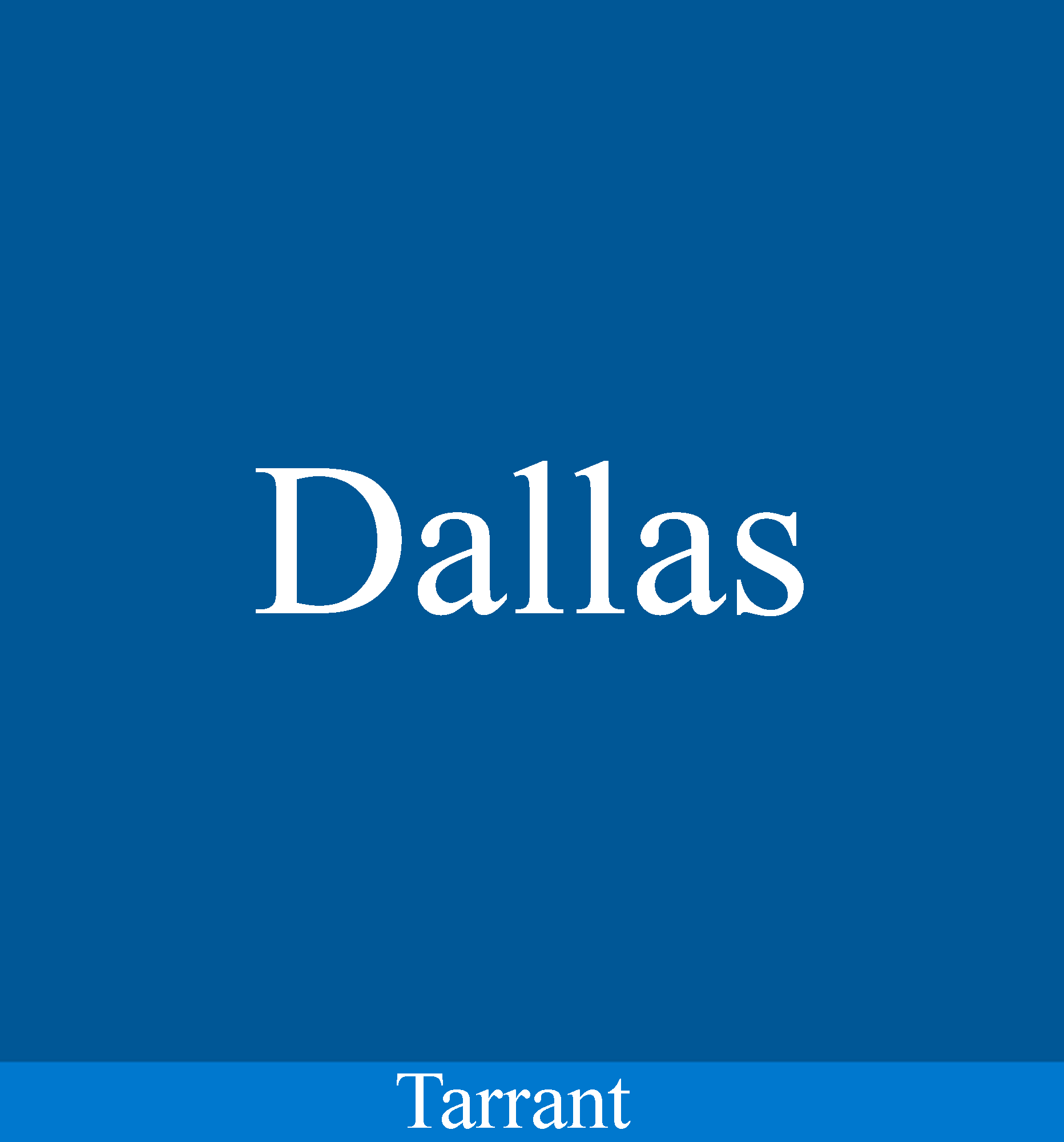
Cartogram of Texas' 30th congressional district

=== General election ===
==== Predictions ====
Source	Ranking	As of
The Cook Political Report	Solid D	February 2, 2023
Inside Elections	Solid D	March 10, 2023
Sabato's Crystal Ball	Safe D	February 23, 2023
Elections Daily	Safe D	September 7, 2023
CNalysis	Solid D	November 16, 2023
Decision Desk HQ	Safe D	June 14, 2024

==== Results ====
2024 Texas's 30th congressional district election
Party	Candidate	Votes	%
Democratic	Jasmine Crockett (incumbent)	197,650	84.9
Libertarian	Jrmar Jefferson	35,175	15.1
Total votes		232,825	100.00
Democratic hold			

==== By county ====
County	Jasmine Crockett Democrat		Jrmar Jefferson Libertarian		Margin		Total votes cast
County	#	%	#	%	#	%	Total votes cast
Dallas	183,848	85.30%	31,671	14.70%	152,177	70.61%	215,519
Tarrant	13,802	79.75%	3,504	20.25%	46,549	59.51%	17,306
Totals	197,650	84.89%	35,175	15.10%	162,475	69.78%	232,825

== District 31 ==
2024 Texas's 31st congressional district election
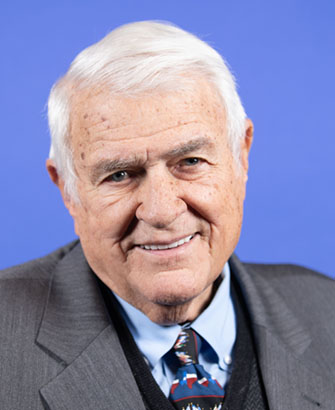

Nominee	John Carter	Stuart Whitlow
Party	Republican	Democratic
Popular vote	228,520	125,959
Percentage	64.5%	35.5%
- Carter: 50–60% 60–70% 70–80% 80–90% >90% Whitlow: 50–60% 60–70% No votes
U.S. Representative before election
John Carter
Republican
Elected U.S. Representative
John Carter
Republican

The 31st district encompasses the exurbs of Austin to Temple, including parts of Williamson and Bell counties. The incumbent was Republican John Carter, who was re-elected unopposed in 2022.

=== Republican primary ===
==== Nominee ====
- John Carter, incumbent U.S. representative

==== Eliminated in primary ====
- William Abel, U.S. Army veteran
- John Anderson, retired oilfield worker
- Abhiram Garapati, real estate investor and candidate for this district in 2020 and 2022
- Mack Latimer, former chair of the Bell County Republican Party
- Mike Williams, retired firefighter and candidate for this district in 2020 and 2022

==== Endorsements ====
John Carter

Executive branch officials

- Donald Trump, 45th president of the United States

Organizations

- AIPAC
- National Rifle Association Political Victory Fund
- National Right to Life Committee
- Pro-Israel America (post-primary)
- Texas Alliance for Life
- Texas Medical Association PAC

==== Fundraising ====
Campaign finance reports as of February 14, 2024
Candidate	Raised	Spent	Cash on hand
William Abel (R)	$8,053	$7,322	$730
John Anderson (R)	$23,228 (Note: $20,000 of this total was self-funded by Anderson)	$12,240	$10,987
John Carter (R)	$783,449	$748,295	$446,645
Abhiram Garapati (R) (Note: Did not file for Q4)	$175	$0	$1,175
Mack Latimer (R)	$30,163 (Note: $4,264 of this total was self-funded by Latimer)	$25,316	$2,523
Mike Williams (R)	$1,900	$1,900	$68,407
Source: Federal Election Commission

==== Results ====
Republican primary results
Party	Candidate	Votes	%
Republican	John Carter (incumbent)	55,092	65.3
Republican	Mike Williams	9,355	11.1
Republican	Mack Latimer	6,593	7.8
Republican	Abhiram Garapati	6,256	7.4
Republican	William Abel	4,362	5.2
Republican	John Anderson	2,732	3.2
Total votes		84,390	100.0

=== Democratic primary ===
==== Nominee ====
- Stuart Whitlow, attorney

==== Eliminated in runoff ====
- Brian Walbridge, consultant

==== Eliminated in primary ====
- Rick Von Pfeil, retired corporate trade consultant

==== Endorsements ====
Stuart Whitlow

Labor unions

- Texas AFL-CIO
- United Auto Workers

==== Fundraising ====
Campaign finance reports as of February 14, 2024
Candidate	Raised	Spent	Cash on hand
Rick Von Pfeil (D)	$125,000	$50,863	$148,324
Stuart Whitlow (D)	$105,946 (Note: $100,000 of this total was self-funded by Whitlow)	$14,594	$91,352
Source: Federal Election Commission

==== Results ====
Democratic primary results
Party	Candidate	Votes	%
Democratic	Stuart Whitlow	10,023	48.4
Democratic	Brian Walbridge	5,346	25.8
Democratic	Rick Von Pfeil	5,332	25.8
Total votes		20,701	100.0

==== Primary runoff results ====
Democratic primary results
Party	Candidate	Votes	%
Democratic	Stuart Whitlow	3,512	68.5
Democratic	Brian Walbridge	1,614	31.5
Total votes		5,126	100.0

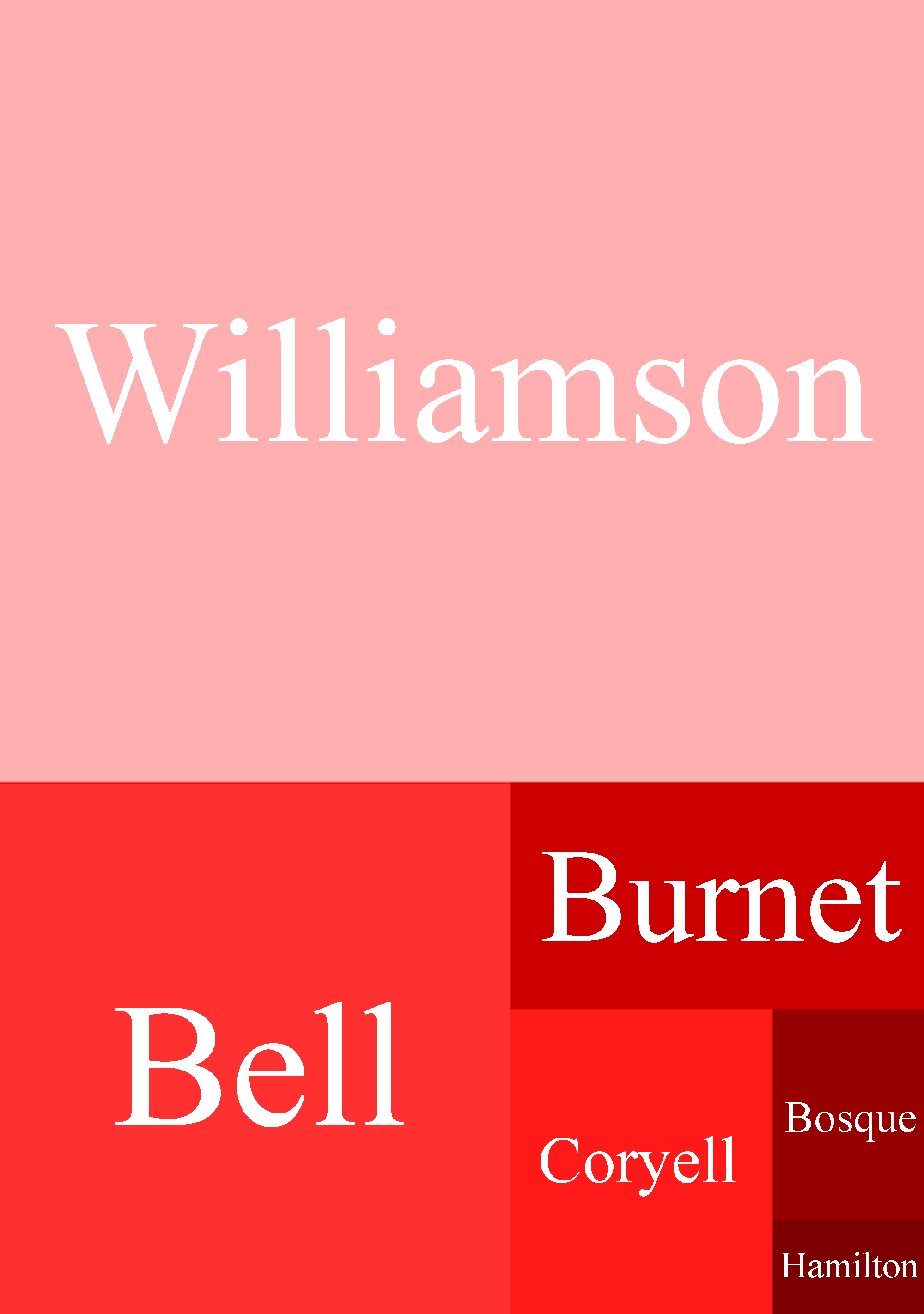
Cartogram of Texas' 31st congressional district

=== General election ===
==== Predictions ====
Source	Ranking	As of
The Cook Political Report	Solid R	February 2, 2023
Inside Elections	Solid R	March 10, 2023
Sabato's Crystal Ball	Safe R	February 23, 2023
Elections Daily	Safe R	September 7, 2023
CNalysis	Solid R	November 16, 2023
Decision Desk HQ	Safe R	June 14, 2024

==== Results ====
2024 Texas's 31st congressional district election
Party	Candidate	Votes	%
Republican	John Carter (incumbent)	228,520	64.5
Democratic	Stuart Whitlow	125,959	35.5
Total votes		354,479	100.0
Republican hold			

==== By county ====
County	John Carter Republican		Stuart Whitlow Democratic		Margin		Total votes cast
County	#	%	#	%	#	%	Total votes cast
Bell	55,862	70.35%	23,548	29.65%	32,314	40.69%	79,410
Bosque	7,975	85.29%	1,375	14.71%	6,600	70.58%	9,350
Burnet	22,047	79.90%	5,546	20.10%	16,501	59.80%	27,593
Coryell	7,975	72.57%	6,433	27.43%	10,588	45.14%	23,454
Hamilton	3,861	87.73%	540	12.27%	3,321	75.46%	4,401
Williamson	122,321	57.88%	89,028	42.12%	33,293	15.75%	211,349
Totals	229,087	64.43%	126,470	35.57%	102,617	28.86%	355,557

== District 32 ==
2024 Texas's 32nd congressional district election
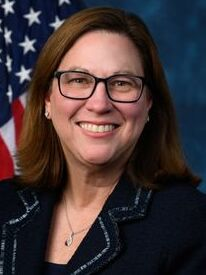

Nominee	Julie Johnson	Darrell Day
Party	Democratic	Republican
Popular vote	140,536	85,941
Percentage	60.4%	37.0%
- Johnson: 40–50% 50–60% 60–70% 70–80% 80–90% >90% Day: 40–50% 50–60% 60–70% 70–80% >90% Tie: 40–50% 50% No votes
U.S. Representative before election
Colin Allred
Democratic
Elected U.S. Representative
Julie Johnson
Democratic

The 32nd district covers northern and eastern Dallas and its inner northern suburbs. The incumbent was Democrat Colin Allred, who was re-elected with 65.36% of the vote in 2022. Allred did not seek re-election, instead choosing to run for U.S. Senate.

=== Democratic primary ===
==== Nominee ====
- Julie Johnson, state representative

==== Eliminated in primary ====
- Callie Butcher, attorney
- Raja Chaudhry, charter bus company owner
- Alex Cornwallis, software engineer
- Kevin Felder, former Dallas city councilor
- Zachariah Manning, businessman
- Jan McDowell, public accountant and perennial candidate
- Justin Moore, civil rights attorney and former Dallas County assistant district attorney
- Chris Panayiotou, workforce management analyst
- Brian Williams, trauma surgeon known for treating victims of the 2016 shooting of Dallas police officers and former chair of the Dallas Community Police Oversight Board

==== Withdrew ====
- Rhetta Bowers, state representative (ran for re-election)
- Sandeep Srivastava, realtor and nominee for the 3rd district in 2022 (switched to the 24th district, then to the 3rd district)

==== Declined ====
- Colin Allred, incumbent U.S. representative (ran for U.S. Senate)
- Nathan Johnson, state senator
- Victoria Neave, state representative (ran for state senate)
- Ana-Maria Ramos, state representative
- Miguel Solis, former Dallas Independent School District trustee

==== Endorsements ====
Endorsements in bold were made after the primary election.

Julie Johnson

U.S. representatives

- Lois Frankel, U.S. representative from Florida (2013–present)
- Beto O'Rourke, former U.S. representative from TX-16 (2013–2019)

Labor unions

- American Federation of Teachers

Organizations

- AIPAC
- **Democratic Majority for Israel**
- EMILY's List
- Equality PAC
- **Everytown for Gun Safety**
- Harvard College Democrats
- Human Rights Campaign
- LPAC
- **NewDem Action Fund**
- Planned Parenthood Action Fund
- **Reproductive Freedom for All**
- Texas Medical Association PAC
- United States Chamber of Commerce
- Vote Common Good (post-primary)

Newspapers

- The Dallas Morning News (Democratic primary only)
Jan McDowell

Organizations

- Freethought Equality Fund
- Vote Common Good
Brian Williams

U.S. senators

- Chris Murphy, Connecticut (2013–present)

U.S. representatives

- Seth Moulton, U.S. representative from Massachusetts's 6th congressional district (2015–present)

Organizations

- 314 Action
- Brady PAC
- VoteVets
- With Honor Fund
Rhetta Bowers (withdrawn)

U.S. representatives

- Eddie Bernice Johnson, former U.S. representative from Texas's 30th congressional district (1993–2023)

==== Fundraising ====
Campaign finance reports as of February 14, 2024
Candidate	Raised	Spent	Cash on hand
Callie Butcher (D)	$124,422 (Note: $48,239 of this total was self-funded by Butcher)	$123,686	$785
Raja Chaudhry (D) (Note: Did not file for Q4)	$305,350 (Note: The entirety of this total was self-funded by Chaudhry)	$39,148	$266,201
Alex Cornwallis (D)	$106,264 (Note: $104,350 of this total was self-funded by Cornwallis)	$50,717	$57,180
Julie Johnson (D)	$1,226,780	$860,095	$366,684
Zachariah Manning (D)	$4,060 (Note: $3,910 of this total was self-funded by Manning)	$3,978	$53
Jan McDowell (D)	$13,558	$11,618	$4,564
Justin Moore (D)	$198,949	$163,893	$35,056
Chris Panayiotou (D)	$5,944 (Note: $3,400 of this total was self-funded by Panayiotou)	$2,811	$0
Brian Williams (D)	$1,105,954	$745,299	$360,654
Source: Federal Election Commission

==== Results ====
Democratic primary results
Party	Candidate	Votes	%
**Democratic**	**Julie Johnson**	**17,633**	**50.4**
Democratic	Brian Williams	6,704	19.2
Democratic	Justin Moore	2,483	7.1
Democratic	Jan McDowell	1,722	4.9
Democratic	Zachariah Manning	1,617	4.6
Democratic	Raja Chaudhry	1,258	3.6
Democratic	Callie Butcher	1,169	3.3
Democratic	Kevin Felder	1,101	3.1
Democratic	Alex Cornwallis	909	2.6
Democratic	Chris Panayiotou	361	1.0
Total votes		**34,957**	**100.0**

=== Republican primary ===
==== Nominee ====
- Darrell Day, businessman and candidate for this district in 2022

==== Eliminated in runoff ====
- David Blewett, former Dallas city councilor

==== Eliminated in primary ====
- Juan Feria, tech consultant
- Gus Khan, home healthcare company owner

==== Declined ====
- Eric Johnson, mayor of Dallas

==== Endorsements ====
David Blewett

Newspapers

- The Dallas Morning News (Republican primary only)

==== Fundraising ====
Campaign finance reports as of February 14, 2024
Candidate	Raised	Spent	Cash on hand
Darrell Day (R)	$124,134 (Note: $110,000 of this total was self-funded by Day)	$23,432	$106,791
Gus Khan (R)	$21,125 (Note: $2,900 of this total was self-funded by Khan)	$16,471	$9,863
Source: Federal Election Commission

==== Results ====
Republican primary results
Party	Candidate	Votes	%
**Republican**	**David Blewett**	**10,706**	**44.4**
**Republican**	**Darrell Day**	**9,211**	**38.2**
Republican	Juan Feria	2,397	9.9
Republican	Gus Khan	1,787	7.4
Total votes		**24,101**	**100.0**

==== Primary runoff results ====
Republican primary results
Party	Candidate	Votes	%
**Republican**	**Darrell Day**	**3,394**	**64.8**
Republican	David Blewett	1,842	35.2
Total votes		**5,236**	**100.0**

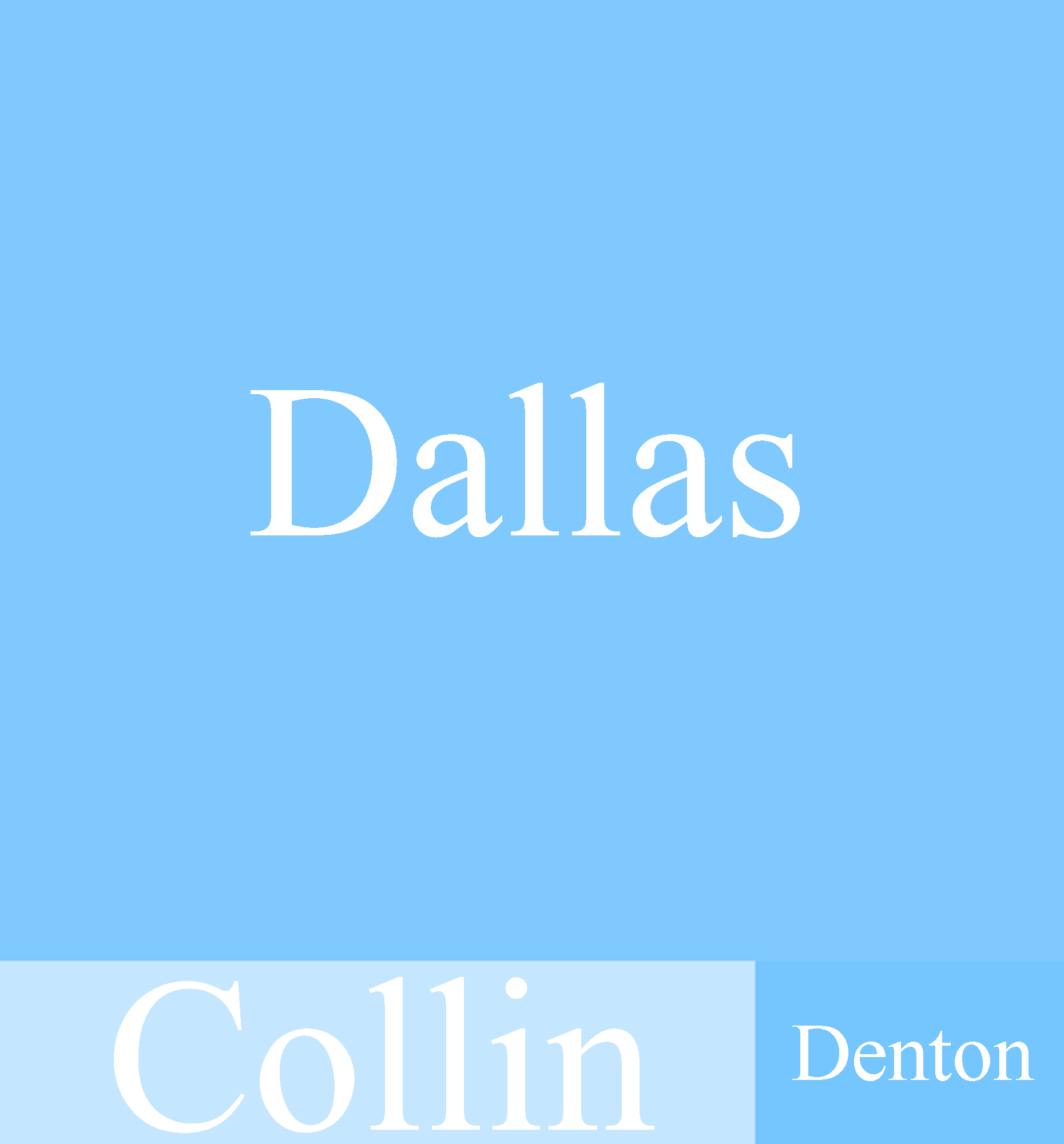
Cartogram of Texas' 32nd congressional district

=== General election ===
==== Predictions ====
Source	Ranking	As of
The Cook Political Report	Solid D	February 2, 2023
Inside Elections	Solid D	March 10, 2023
Sabato's Crystal Ball	Safe D	February 23, 2023
Elections Daily	Safe D	September 7, 2023
CNalysis	Solid D	November 16, 2023
Decision Desk HQ	Safe D	June 14, 2024

==== Endorsements ====
Julie Johnson

Newspapers

- The Dallas Morning News

==== Results ====
2024 Texas's 32nd congressional district election
Party	Candidate	Votes	%
**Democratic**	**Julie Johnson**	**140,536**	**60.4**
Republican	Darrell Day	85,941	37.0
Libertarian	Kevin Hale	5,987	2.6
Total votes		**232,464**	**100.0**
Democratic **hold**			

==== By county ====
County	Julie Johnson Democratic		Darrell Day Republican		Kevin Hale Libertarian		Margin		Total votes cast
County	#	%	#	%	#	%	#	%	Total votes cast
Collin	14,347	54.34%	11,253	42.62%	801	3.03%	3,094	11.72%	26,401
Dallas	120,160	61.20%	71,272	36.30%	4,913	2.50%	48,888	24.90%	196,345
Denton	6,029	62.04%	3,416	35.15%	273	2.81%	2,613	26.89%	9,718
Totals	140,536	60.45%	85,941	36.97%	5,987	2.58%	54,595	23.49%	232,464

== District 33 ==
2024 Texas's 33rd congressional district election
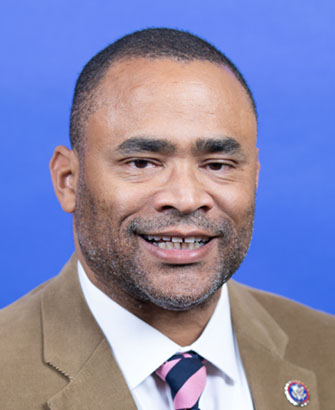

Nominee	Marc Veasey	Patrick Gillespie
Party	Democratic	Republican
Popular vote	113,461	51,607
Percentage	68.7%	31.3%
- Veasey: 50–60% 60–70% 70–80% 80–90% >90% Gillespie: 50–60% 60–70% >90% No votes
U.S. Representative before election
Marc Veasey
Democratic
Elected U.S. Representative
Marc Veasey
Democratic

The 33rd district is in the Dallas–Fort Worth metroplex, encompassing Downtown Fort Worth, western Dallas, and parts of Grand Prairie, Irving, Carrollton, and Farmers Branch. The incumbent was Democrat Marc Veasey, who was re-elected with 71.98% of the vote in 2022.

=== Democratic primary ===
==== Nominee ====
- Marc Veasey, incumbent U.S. representative

==== Eliminated in primary ====
- Carlos Quintanilla, community activist and perennial candidate

==== Endorsements ====
Marc Veasey

Organizations

- AIPAC
- League of Conservation Voters
- Pro-Israel America (post-primary)
- Texas Medical Association PAC

Labor unions

- National Education Association
- Texas AFL-CIO
- Texas American Federation of Teachers
- United Auto Workers

==== Fundraising ====
Campaign finance reports as of February 14, 2024
Candidate	Raised	Spent	Cash on hand
Marc Veasey (D)	$844,451	$746,416	$908,780
Source: Federal Election Commission

==== Results ====
Democratic primary results
Party	Candidate	Votes	%
Democratic	Marc Veasey (incumbent)	15,313	68.3
Democratic	Carlos Quintanilla	7,102	31.7
Total votes		22,415	100.0

=== Republican primary ===
==== Nominee ====
- Patrick Gillespie, customs entry writer and nominee for this district in 2022

==== Eliminated in primary ====
- Kurt Schwab, marketing consultant

==== Fundraising ====
Campaign finance reports as of February 14, 2024
Candidate	Raised	Spent	Cash on hand
Kurt Schwab (R)	$12,422 (Note: $100 of this total was self-funded by Schwab)	$12,247	$174
Source: Federal Election Commission

==== Results ====
Republican primary results
Party	Candidate	Votes	%
Republican	Patrick Gillespie	6,144	61.6
Republican	Kurt Schwab	3,833	38.4
Total votes		9,977	100.0

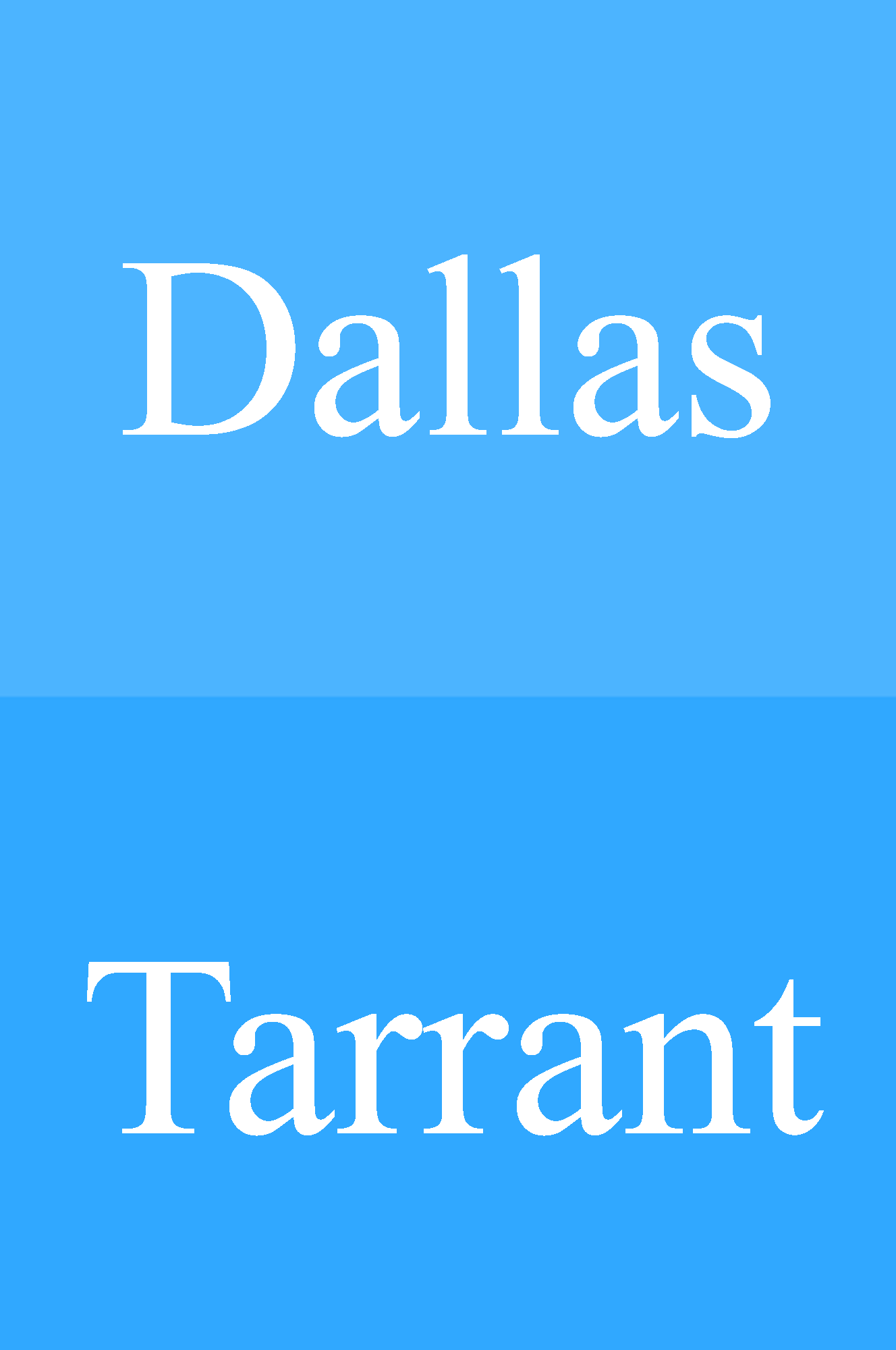
Cartogram of Texas' 23rd congressional district

=== General election ===
==== Predictions ====
Source	Ranking	As of
The Cook Political Report	Solid D	February 2, 2023
Inside Elections	Solid D	March 10, 2023
Sabato's Crystal Ball	Safe D	February 23, 2023
Elections Daily	Safe D	September 7, 2023
CNalysis	Solid D	November 16, 2023
Decision Desk HQ	Safe D	June 14, 2024

==== Endorsements ====
Marc Veasey

Newspapers

- The Dallas Morning News

==== Results ====
2024 Texas's 33rd congressional district election
Party	Candidate	Votes	%
Democratic	Marc Veasey (incumbent)	113,461	68.7
Republican	Patrick Gillespie	51,607	31.3
Total votes		165,068	100.0
Democratic hold			

==== By county ====
County	Marc Veasey Democratic		Patrick Gillespie Republican		Margin		Total votes cast
County	#	%	#	%	#	%	Total votes cast
Dallas	57,776	67.38%	27,965	32.62%	29,811	34.77%	85,741
Tarrant	56,513	70.28%	23,899	29.72%	32,614	40.56%	80,412
Totals	114,289	68.79%	51,864	31.21%	62,425	37.57%	166,153

== District 34 ==
2024 Texas's 34th congressional district election
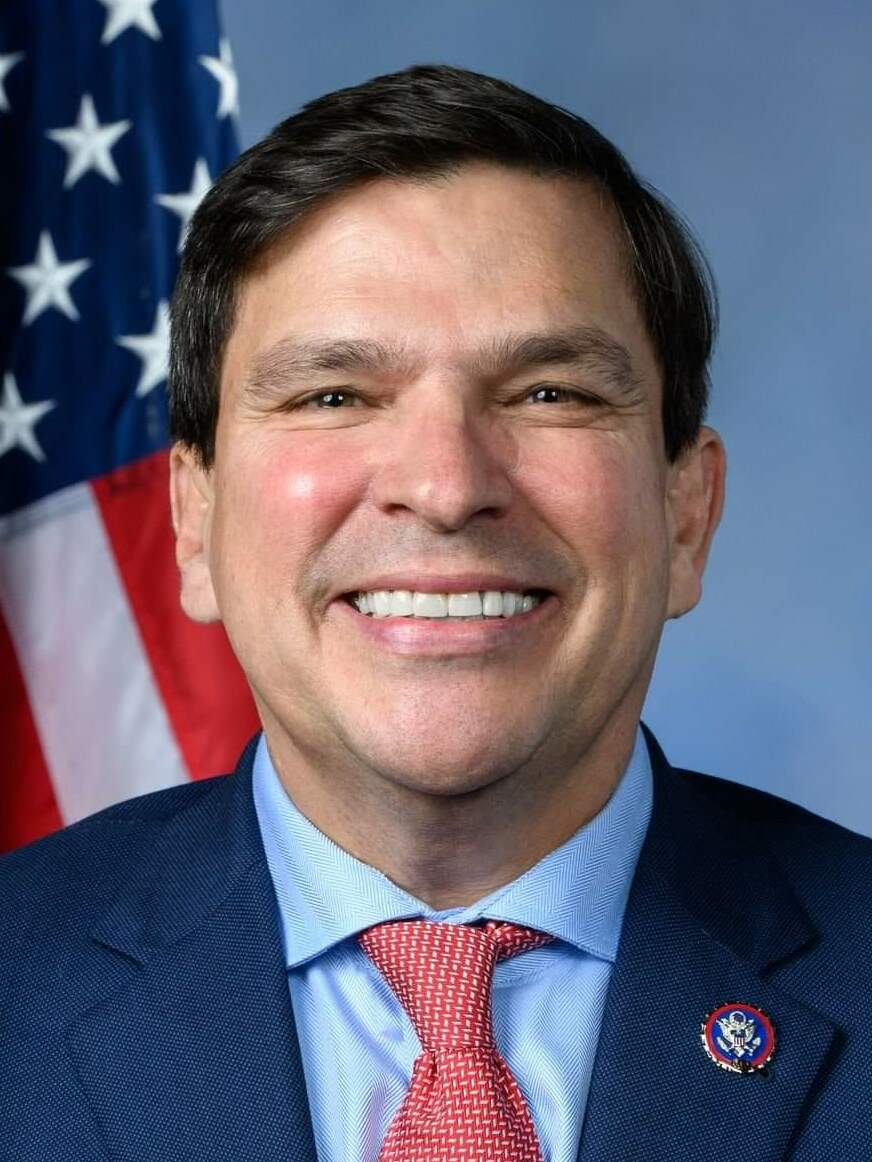

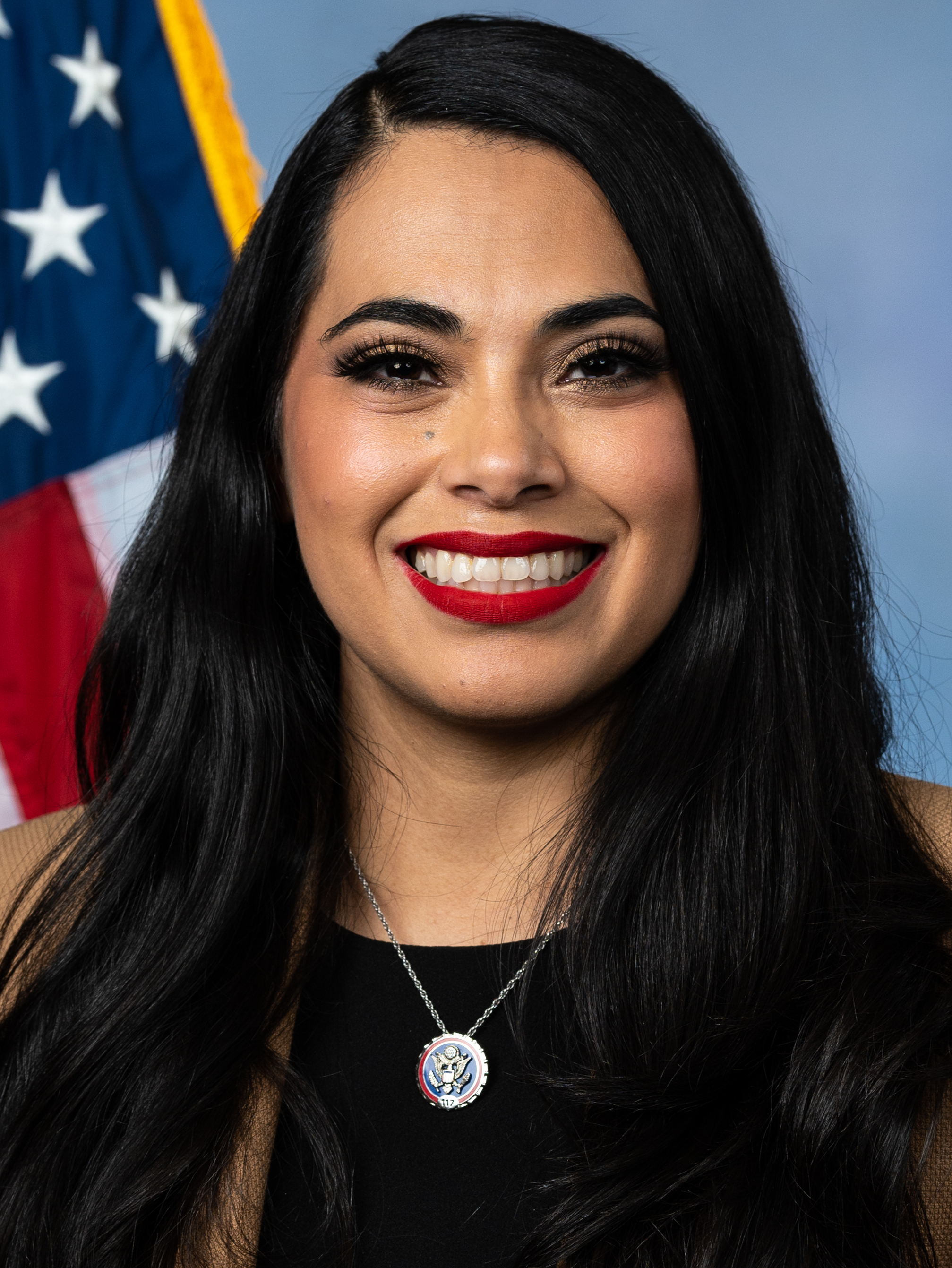
Nominee	Vicente Gonzalez	Mayra Flores
Party	Democratic	Republican
Popular vote	102,607	97,470
Percentage	51.3%	48.7%
- Gonzalez: 50–60% 60–70% 80–90% >90% Flores: 50–60% 60–70% 70–80% 80–90% Tie: 50%
U.S. Representative before election
Vicente Gonzalez
Democratic
Elected U.S. Representative
Vicente Gonzalez
Democratic

The 34th district stretches from McAllen and Brownsville in the Rio Grande Valley, northward along the Gulf Coast. The incumbent was Democrat Vicente Gonzalez, who was elected with 52.73% of the vote in 2022.

=== Democratic primary ===
==== Nominee ====
- Vicente Gonzalez, incumbent U.S. representative

==== Endorsements ====
Vicente Gonzalez

Organizations

- AIPAC
- Democratic Majority for Israel
- Humane Society Legislative Fund
- NextGen America PAC (post-primary)
- Pro-Israel America (post-primary)
- Texas Medical Association PAC

Labor unions

- National Education Association
- Texas AFL-CIO
- Texas American Federation of Teachers
- United Auto Workers

==== Fundraising ====
Campaign finance reports as of February 14, 2024
Candidate	Raised	Spent	Cash on hand
Vincente Gonzalez (D)	$1,313,894	$409,814	$1,208,033
Source: Federal Election Commission

==== Results ====
Democratic primary results
Party	Candidate	Votes	%
Democratic	Vicente Gonzalez (incumbent)	27,745	100.0
Total votes		27,745	100.0

=== Republican primary ===
==== Nominee ====
- Mayra Flores, former U.S. representative

==== Eliminated in primary ====
- Laura Cisneros, realtor and Democratic candidate for this district in 2022
- Mauro Garza, nightclub owner and perennial candidate
- Gregory Kunkle, musician and candidate for this district in 2022

==== Disqualified ====
- Ann Marie Torres, Kingsville city commissioner (endorsed Garza)

==== Declined ====
- Luis Cabrera, pastor (endorsed Flores)

==== Endorsements ====
Mayra Flores

Executive branch officials

- Donald Trump, 45th president of the United States

U.S. representatives

- Mike Johnson, Speaker of the U.S. House of Representatives (2023–present)
- Kevin McCarthy, former Speaker of the U.S. House of Representatives

Organizations

- National Rifle Association Political Victory Fund
- Susan B. Anthony Pro-Life America
Mauro Garza

Local officials

- Joe Arpaio, former sheriff of Maricopa County, Arizona

==== Fundraising ====
Campaign finance reports as of February 14, 2024
Candidate	Raised	Spent	Cash on hand
Laura Cisneros (R)	$17,770 (Note: $15,000 of this total was self-funded by Garza)	$61,059	$212
Mayra Flores (R)	$2,247,287	$1,827,013	$446,494
Mauro Garza (R)	$975,169 (Note: $192,710 of this total was self-funded by Garza)	$981,167	$7,508
Source: Federal Election Commission

==== Results ====
Republican primary results
Party	Candidate	Votes	%
Republican	Mayra Flores	18,307	81.2
Republican	Laura Cisneros	1,991	8.8
Republican	Mauro Garza	1,388	6.2
Republican	Gregory Kunkle	863	3.8
Total votes		22,549	100.0

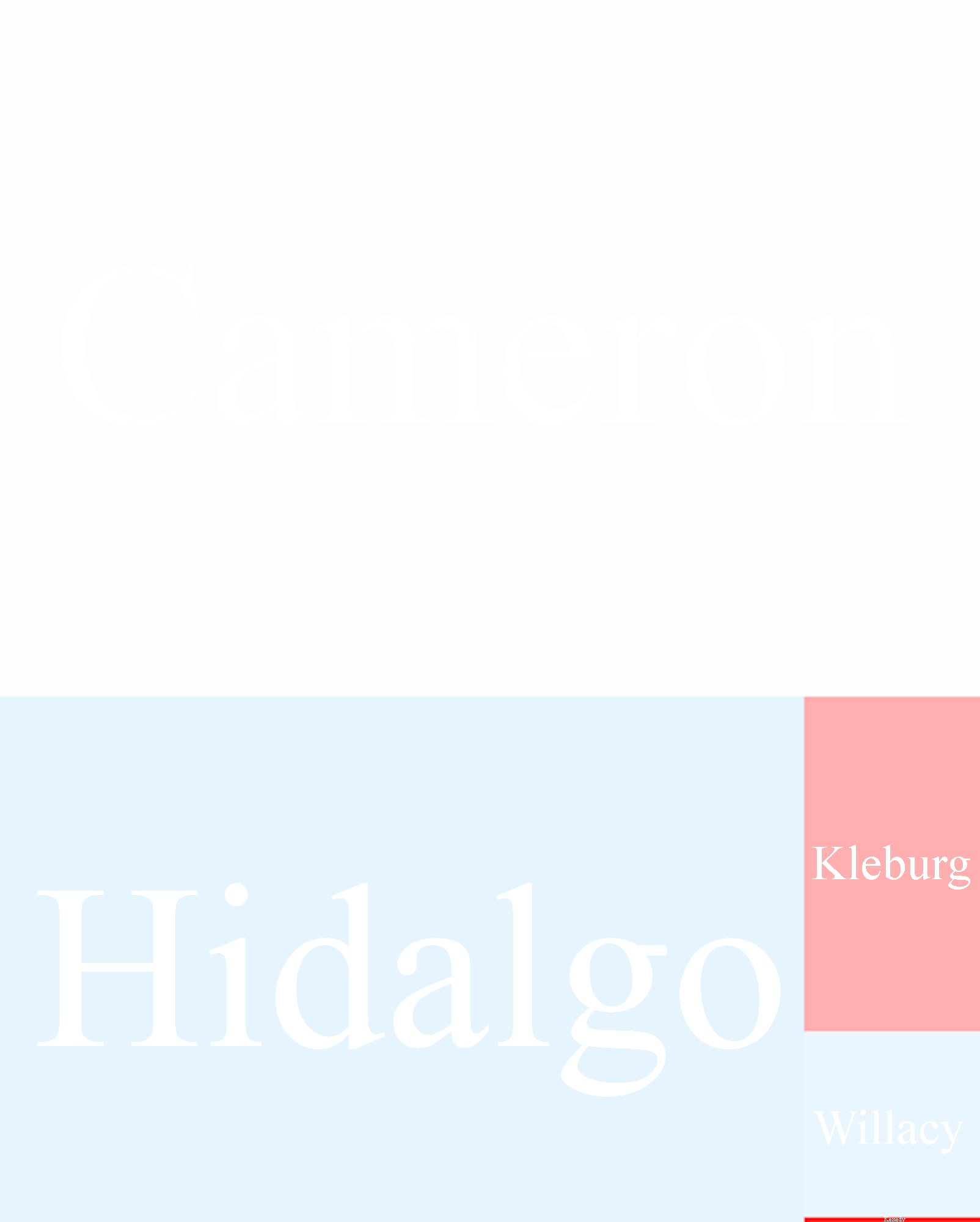
Cartogram of Texas' 34th congressional district

=== General election ===
==== Predictions ====
Source	Ranking	As of
The Cook Political Report	Lean D	July 20, 2023
Inside Elections	Lean D	October 18, 2024
Sabato's Crystal Ball	Lean D	February 21, 2024
Elections Daily	Lean D	September 7, 2023
CNalysis	Likely D	November 16, 2023
Decision Desk HQ	Likely D	June 14, 2024

==== Polling ====
Poll source	Date(s) administered	Sample size	Margin of error	Vicente Gonzalez (D)	Mayra Flores (R)	Undecided
1892 Polling (R) (Note: Poll sponsored by the NRCC)	September 28 – October 1, 2024	400 (LV)	± 4.9%	49%	46%	6%
1892 Polling (R)	April 11–13, 2024	400 (LV)	± 4.9%	48%	45%	7%
1892 Polling (R)	May 24–26, 2023	439 (LV)	± 4.7%	42%	42%	16%

==== Results ====
2024 Texas's 34th congressional district election
Party	Candidate	Votes	%
Democratic	Vicente Gonzalez (incumbent)	102,680	51.3%
Republican	Mayra Flores	97,603	48.7%
Total votes		200,283	100.0%
Democratic hold			

==== By county ====
County	Vicente Gonzalez Democratic		Mayra Flores Republican		Margin		Total votes cast
County	#	%	#	%	#	%	Total votes cast
Cameron	57,424	50.24%	56,879	49.76%	545	0.48%	114,303
Hidalgo	38,309	54.24%	32,324	45.76%	5,985	8.47%	70,633
Kenedy	40	28.99%	98	71.01%	−58	−42.03%	138
Kleberg	4,178	42.35%	5,688	57.65%	−1,510	−15.31%	9,866
Willacy	2,829	51.98%	2,614	48.02%	215	3.95%	5,443
Totals	102,780	51.29%	97,603	48.71%	5,177	2.58%	200,383

== District 35 ==
2024 Texas's 35th congressional district election
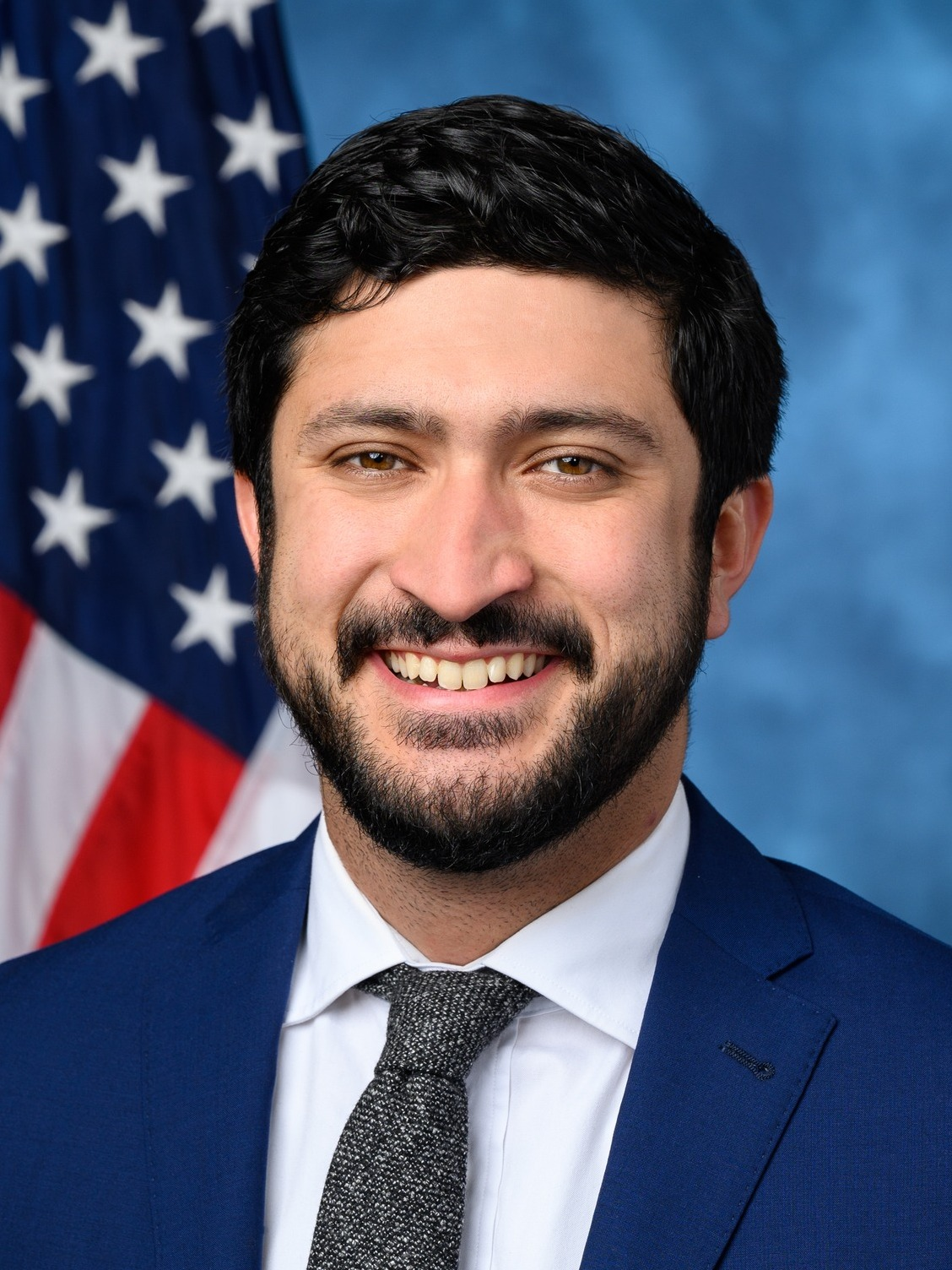

Nominee	Greg Casar	Steven Wright
Party	Democratic	Republican
Popular vote	169,896	82,354
Percentage	67.4%	32.6%
- Casar: 50–60% 60–70% 70–80% 80–90% >90% Wright: 50–60% 60–70% 70–80% >90% Tie: 50% No data
U.S. Representative before election
Greg Casar
Democratic
Elected U.S. Representative
Greg Casar
Democratic

The 35th district connects eastern San Antonio to southeastern Austin, through the I-35 corridor. The incumbent was Democrat Greg Casar, who was elected with 72.58% of the vote in 2022.

=== Democratic primary ===
==== Nominee ====
- Greg Casar, incumbent U.S. representative

==== Endorsements ====
Greg Casar

U.S. representatives

- Joaquin Castro, U.S. representative from Texas's 20th congressional district
- Lloyd Doggett, U.S. representative from Texas's 37th congressional district

Political parties

- Working Families Party

Labor unions

- National Education Association
- National Nurses United
- National Union of Healthcare Workers
- Texas AFL-CIO
- Texas American Federation of Teachers
- United Auto Workers
- United Farm Workers

Organizations

- Bend the Arc
- Humane Society Legislative Fund
- Justice Democrats
- Latino Victory Fund
- League of Conservation Voters
- NextGen America PAC (post-primary)
- Peace Action
- Planned Parenthood Action Fund
- Population Connection Action Fund
- Stonewall Democrats of San Antonio
- Sunrise Movement

==== Fundraising ====
Campaign finance reports as of February 14, 2024
Candidate	Raised	Spent	Cash on hand
Greg Casar (D)	$764,381	$520,771	$406,571
Source: Federal Election Commission

==== Results ====
Democratic primary results
Party	Candidate	Votes	%
Democratic	Greg Casar (incumbent)	28,830	100.0
Total votes		28,830	100.0

=== Republican primary ===
==== Nominee ====
- Steven Wright, retired deputy sheriff

==== Eliminated in runoff ====
- Michael Rodriguez, supply chain manager

==== Eliminated in primary ====
- David Cuddy, former Alaska state representative
- Brandon Dunn, loss prevention professional
- Rod Lingsch, pilot and perennial candidate

==== Fundraising ====
Campaign finance reports as of February 14, 2024
Candidate	Raised	Spent	Cash on hand
David Cuddy (R)	$0	$0	$0
Steven Wright (R)	$25,000 (Note: The entirety of this total was self-funded by Wright)	$4,022	$20,977
Source: Federal Election Commission

==== Results ====
Republican primary results
Party	Candidate	Votes	%
Republican	Michael Rodriguez	4,085	27.1
Republican	Steven Wright	3,715	24.6
Republican	David Cuddy	3,079	20.4
Republican	Brandon Dunn	2,700	17.9
Republican	Rod Lingsch	1,514	10.0
Total votes		15,093	100.0

==== Primary runoff results ====
Republican primary results
Party	Candidate	Votes	%
Republican	Steven Wright	1,082	50.1
Republican	Michael Rodriguez	1,077	49.9
Total votes		2,159	100.0

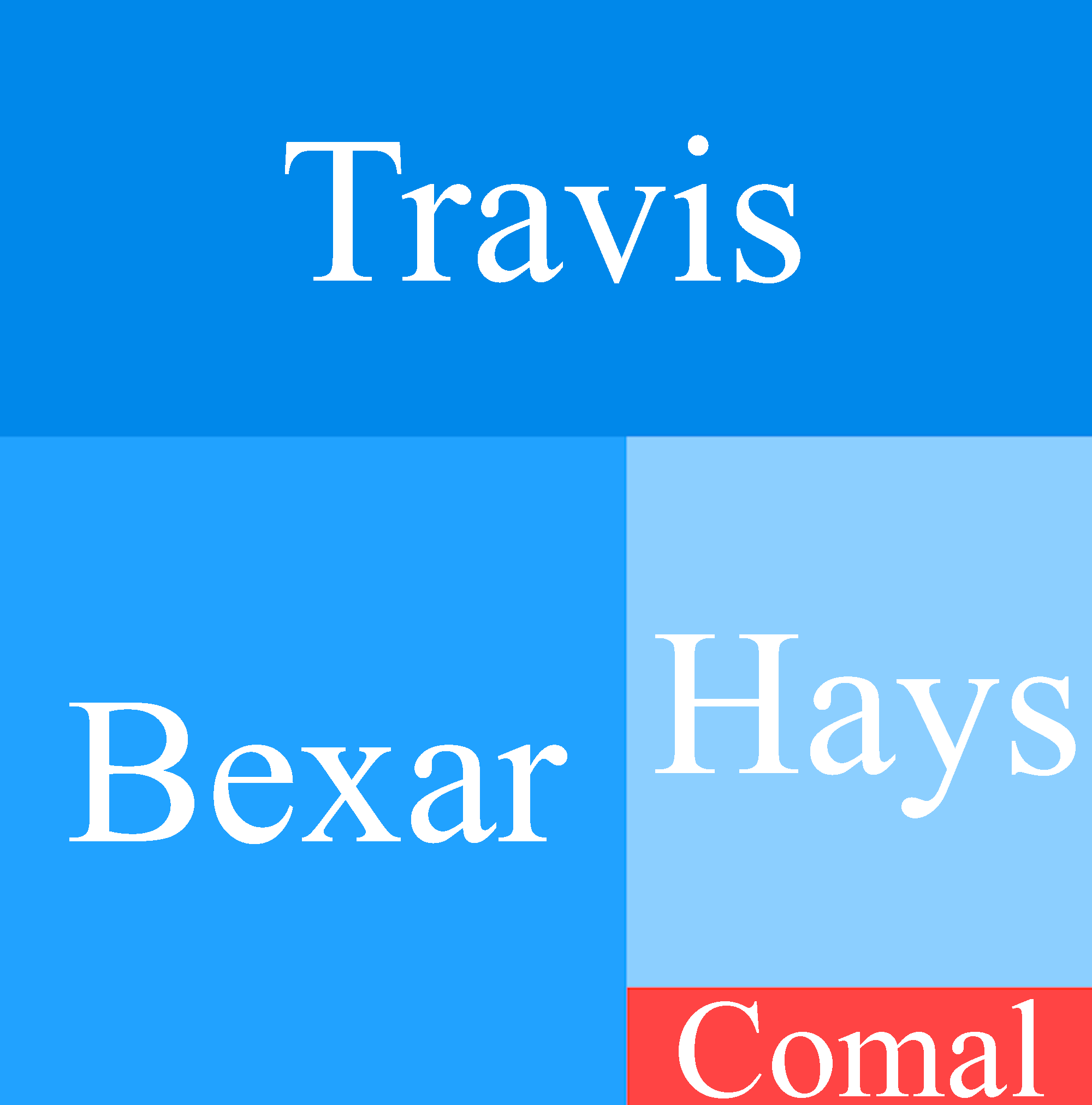
Cartogram of Texas' 35th congressional district

=== General election ===
==== Predictions ====
Source	Ranking	As of
The Cook Political Report	Solid D	February 2, 2023
Inside Elections	Solid D	March 10, 2023
Sabato's Crystal Ball	Safe D	February 23, 2023
Elections Daily	Safe D	September 7, 2023
CNalysis	Solid D	November 16, 2023
Decision Desk HQ	Safe D	June 14, 2024

==== Results ====
2024 Texas's 35th congressional district election
Party	Candidate	Votes	%
Democratic	Greg Casar (incumbent)	169,896	67.4
Republican	Steven Wright	82,354	32.6
Total votes		252,250	100.0
Democratic hold			

==== By county ====
County	Greg Casar Democratic		Steven Wright Republican		Margin		Total votes cast
County	#	%	#	%	#	%	Total votes cast
Bexar	57,003	64.80%	30,969	35.20%	26,034	29.60%	87,972
Comal	3,737	31.77%	8,025	68.23%	−4,288	−36.46%	11,762
Hays	32,899	61.36%	20,720	38.64%	12,179	22.71%	53,619
Travis	76,870	77.05%	22,896	22.95%	53,974	54.10%	99,766
Totals	170,509	67.36%	82,610	32.64%	87,899	34.73%	253,119

== District 36 ==
2024 Texas's 36th congressional district election
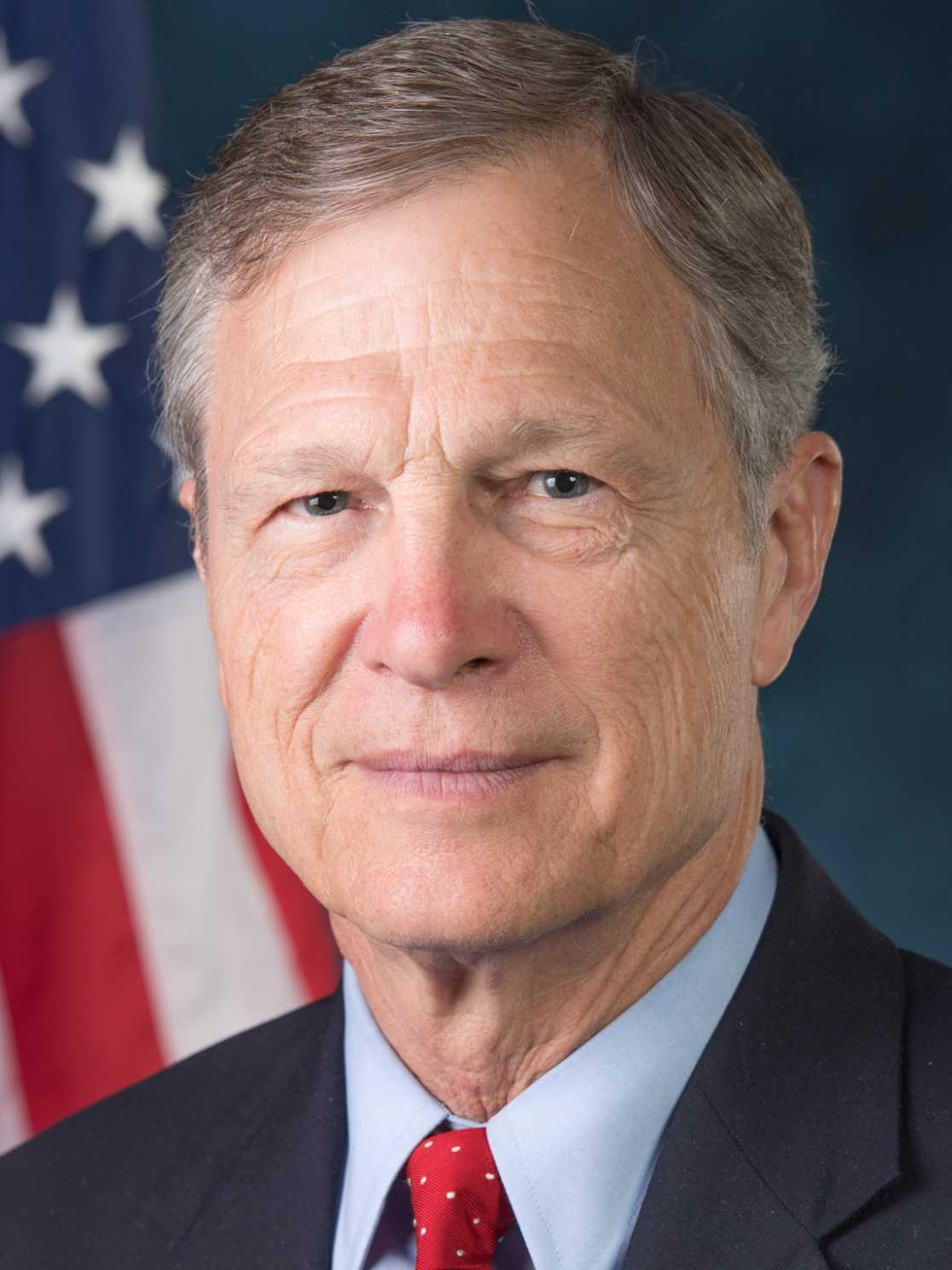

Nominee	Brian Babin	Dayna Steele
Party	Republican	Democratic
Popular vote	205,539	90,458
Percentage	69.4%	30.6%
- Babin: 50–60% 60–70% 70–80% 80–90% >90% Steele: 50–60% 60–70% 70–80% 80–90% >90% No data
U.S. Representative before election
Brian Babin
Republican
Elected U.S. Representative
Brian Babin
Republican

The incumbent was Republican Brian Babin, who was re-elected with 69.46% of the vote in 2022.

=== Republican primary ===
==== Nominee ====
- Brian Babin, incumbent U.S. representative

==== Eliminated in primary ====
- Jonathan Mitchell, pipeline worker

==== Endorsements ====
Brian Babin

Executive branch officials

- Donald Trump, 45th president of the United States

Organizations

- AIPAC
- National Rifle Association Political Victory Fund
- Texas Alliance for Life
- Texas Medical Association PAC

==== Fundraising ====
Campaign finance reports as of February 14, 2024
Candidate	Raised	Spent	Cash on hand
Brian Babin (R)	$619,314	$600,352	$943,902
Source: Federal Election Commission

==== Results ====
Republican primary results
Party	Candidate	Votes	%
Republican	Brian Babin (incumbent)	58,635	81.3
Republican	Jonathan Mitchell	13,448	18.7
Total votes		72,083	100.0

=== Democratic primary ===
==== Nominee ====
- Dayna Steele, writer, former KLOL radio DJ, and nominee for this district in 2018

==== Results ====
Democratic primary results
Party	Candidate	Votes	%
Democratic	Dayna Steele	14,973	100.0
Total votes		14,973	100.0

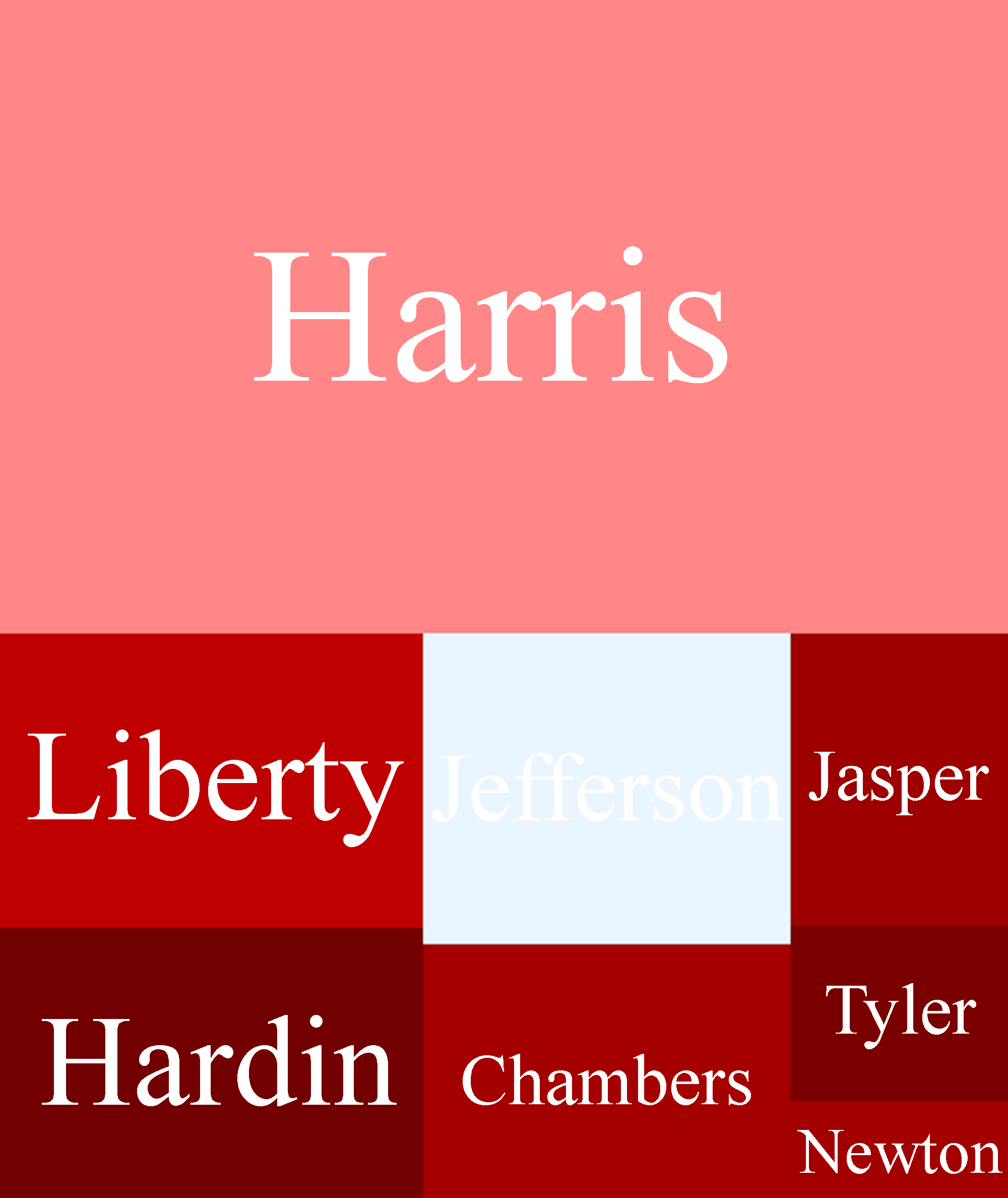
Cartogram of Texas' 36th congressional district

=== General election ===
==== Predictions ====
Source	Ranking	As of
The Cook Political Report	Solid R	February 2, 2023
Inside Elections	Solid R	March 10, 2023
Sabato's Crystal Ball	Safe R	February 23, 2023
Elections Daily	Safe R	September 7, 2023
CNalysis	Solid R	November 16, 2023
Decision Desk HQ	Safe R	June 14, 2024

==== Results ====
2024 Texas's 36th congressional district election
Party	Candidate	Votes	%
Republican	Brian Babin (incumbent)	205,539	69.4
Democratic	Dayna Steele	90,458	30.6
Total votes		295,997	100.0
Republican hold			

==== By county ====
County	Brian Babin Republican		Dayna Steele Democratic		Margin		Total votes cast
County	#	%	#	%	#	%	Total votes cast
Chambers	20,637	83.73%	4,009	16.27%	16,628	67.47%	24,646
Hardin	24,776	88.78%	3,130	11.22%	21,646	77.57%	27,906
Harris	96,900	61.72%	60,090	38.28%	36,810	23.45%	156,990
Jasper	13,193	84.53%	2,415	15.47%	10,778	69.05%	15,608
Jefferson	13,633	52.10%	12,532	47.90%	1,101	4.21%	26,165
Liberty	24,884	81.37%	5,699	18.63%	19,185	62.73%	30,583
Newton	4,749	84.11%	897	15.89%	3,852	68.23%	5,646
Tyler	8,338	88.01%	1,136	11.99%	7,202	76.02%	9,474
Totals	206,009	69.36%	91,009	30.64%	115,000	38.72%	297,018

== District 37 ==
2024 Texas's 37th congressional district election
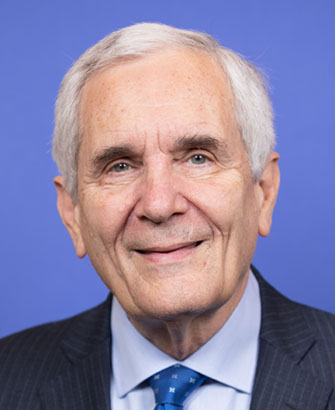

Nominee	Lloyd Doggett	Jenny Garcia Sharon
Party	Democratic	Republican
Popular vote	252,980	80,366
Percentage	74.22%	23.58%
- Doggett: 50–60% 60–70% 70–80% 80–90% ≥90%
U.S. Representative before election
Lloyd Doggett
Democratic
Elected U.S. Representative
Lloyd Doggett
Democratic

The 37th district is based in Austin and its suburbs, including Wells Branch and Steiner Ranch. The incumbent was Democrat Lloyd Doggett, who was re-elected with 76.80% of the vote in 2022.

=== Democratic primary ===
==== Nominee ====
- Lloyd Doggett, incumbent U.S. representative

==== Eliminated in primary ====
- Christopher McNerney, cybersecurity professional
- Eduardo Romero, medical science liaison

==== Endorsements ====
Lloyd Doggett

Organizations

- Humane Society Legislative Fund
- J Street PAC
- Population Connection Action Fund
- Texas Medical Association PAC

Labor unions

- Texas AFL-CIO
- Texas American Federation of Teachers
- United Auto Workers

Newspapers

- The Austin Chronicle

==== Fundraising ====
Campaign finance reports as of February 14, 2024
Candidate	Raised	Spent	Cash on hand
Lloyd Doggett (D)	$651,186	$265,791	$5,699,976
Christopher McNerney (D)	$0	$9,222	$0
Source: Federal Election Commission

==== Results ====
Democratic primary results
Party	Candidate	Votes	%
Democratic	Lloyd Doggett (incumbent)	57,762	86.1
Democratic	Christopher McNerney	5,279	7.9
Democratic	Eduardo Romero	4,048	6.0
Total votes		67,089	100.0

=== Republican primary ===
==== Nominee ====
- Jenny Garcia Sharon, volunteer caregiver, perennial candidate, and nominee for this district in 2022

==== Results ====
Republican primary results
Party	Candidate	Votes	%
Republican	Jenny Garcia Sharon	16,304	100.0
Total votes		16,304	100.0

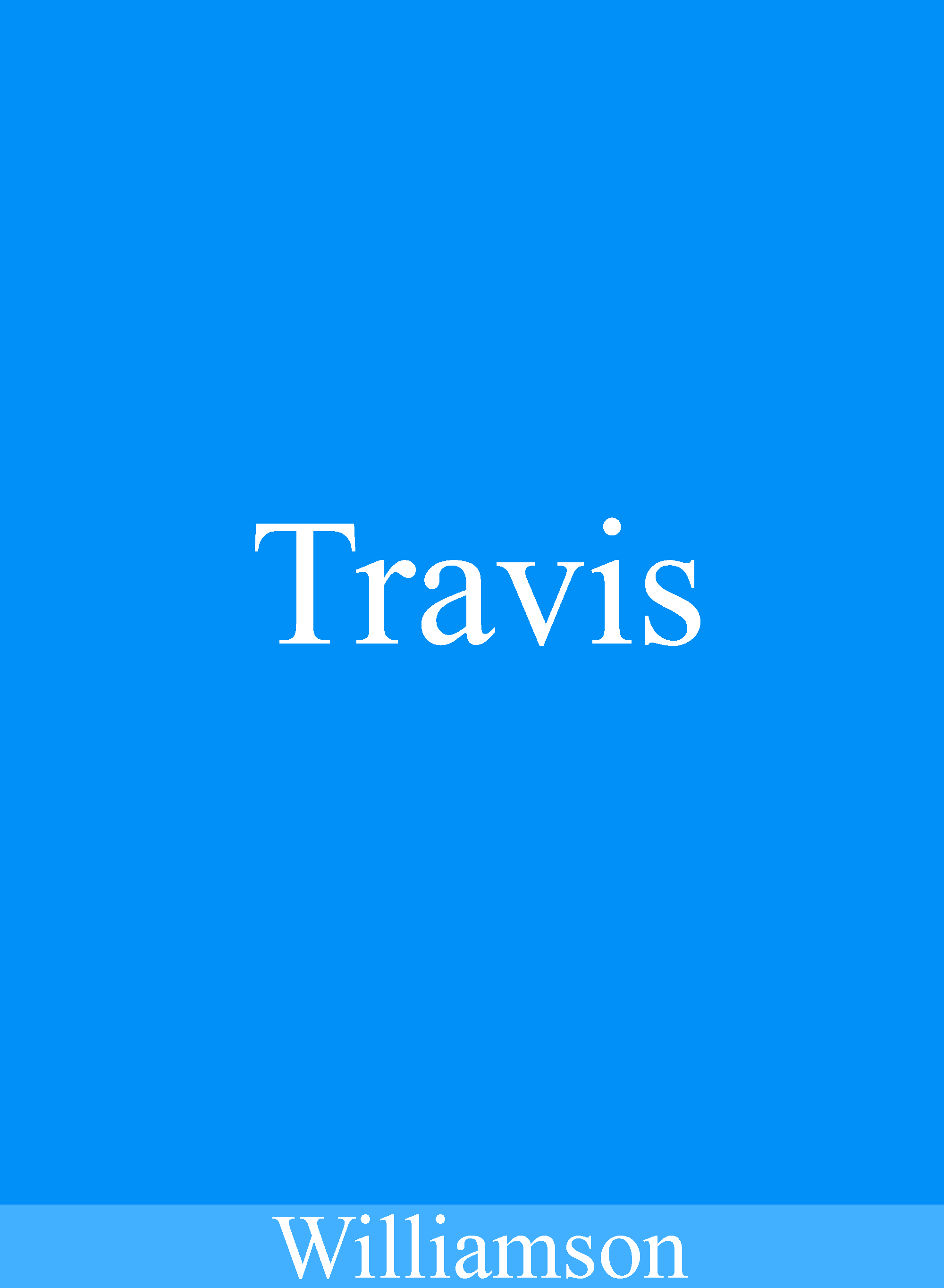
Cartogram of Texas' 37th congressional district

=== General election ===
==== Predictions ====
Source	Ranking	As of
The Cook Political Report	Solid D	February 2, 2023
Inside Elections	Solid D	March 10, 2023
Sabato's Crystal Ball	Safe D	February 23, 2023
Elections Daily	Safe D	September 7, 2023
CNalysis	Solid D	November 16, 2023
Decision Desk HQ	Safe D	June 14, 2024

==== Results ====
2024 Texas's 37th congressional district election
Party	Candidate	Votes	%
Democratic	Lloyd Doggett (incumbent)	252,980	74.22
Republican	Jenny Garcia Sharon	80,366	23.58
Independent	Girish Altekar	7,511	2.20
Total votes		340,857	100.0
Democratic hold			

==== By county ====
County	Lloyd Doggett Democratic		Jenny Garcia Sharon Republican		Various candidates Other parties		Margin		Total votes cast
County	#	%	#	%	#	%	#	%	Total votes cast
Travis	238,470	74.71%	73,861	23.14%	6,855	2.15%	164,609	51.57%	319,186
Williamson	14,510	74.71%	6,505	23.14%	656	2.15%	8,005	51.57%	21,671
Totals	252,980	74.22%	80,366	23.58%	7,511	2.20%	172,614	50.64%	340,857

== District 38 ==
2024 Texas's 38th congressional district election
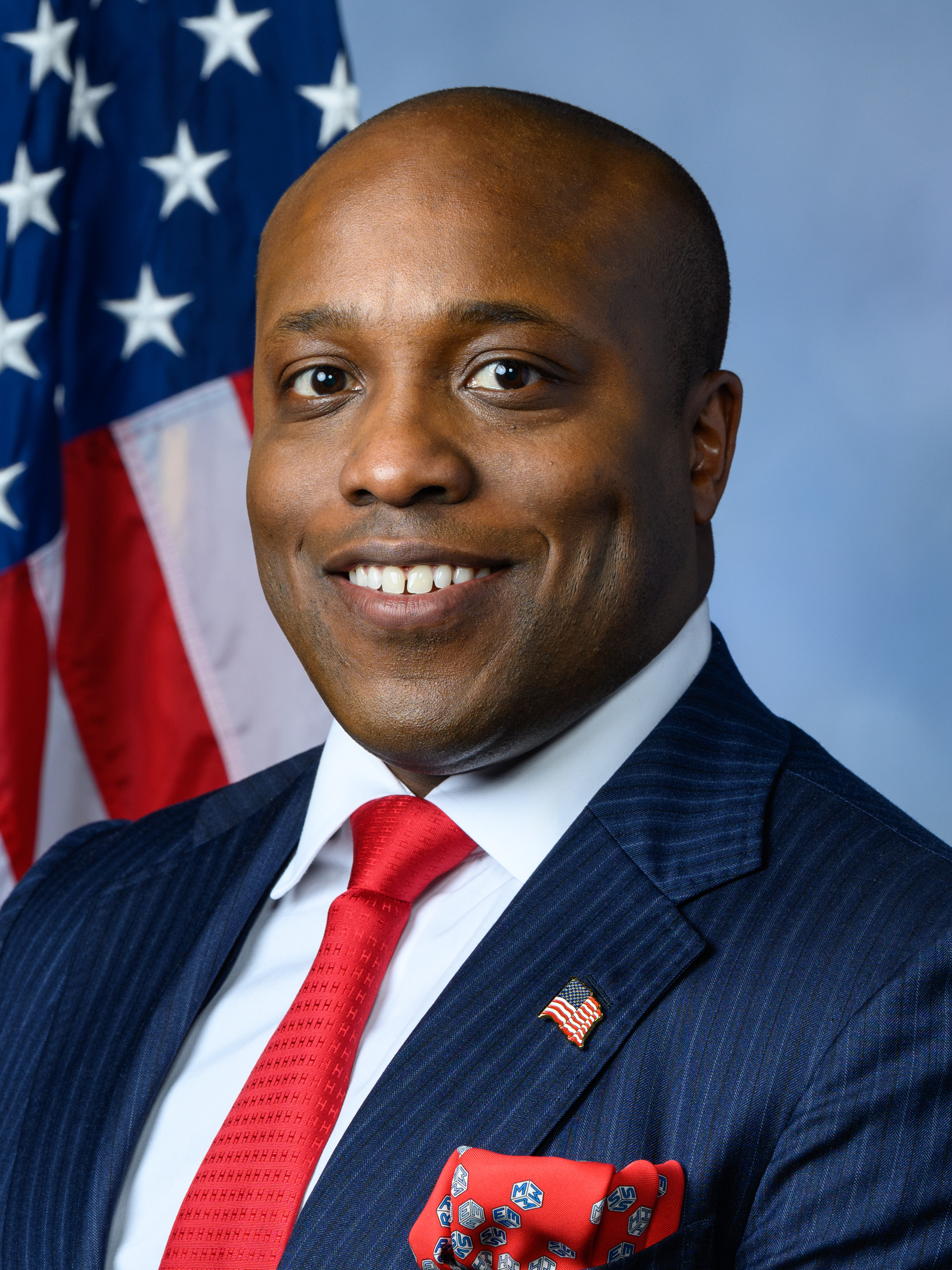

Nominee	Wesley Hunt	Melissa McDonough
Party	Republican	Democratic
Popular vote	215,030	127,640
Percentage	62.73%	37.24%
- Hunt: 50–60% 60–70% 70–80% 80–90% McDonough: 50–60% No votes
U.S. Representative before election
Wesley Hunt
Republican
Elected U.S. Representative
Wesley Hunt
Republican

The 38th district is based in the north and northwest Harris County Houston suburbs such as Jersey Village, Cypress, Tomball, Katy, and Klein. The incumbent was Republican Wesley Hunt, who was elected with 62.95% of the vote in 2022.

=== Republican primary ===
==== Nominee ====
- Wesley Hunt, incumbent U.S. representative

==== Endorsements ====
Wesley Hunt

Executive branch officials

- Donald Trump, 45th president of the United States

Organizations

- AIPAC
- National Rifle Association Political Victory Fund
- Texas Alliance for Life
- Texas Medical Association PAC

==== Fundraising ====
Campaign finance reports as of February 14, 2024
Candidate	Raised	Spent	Cash on hand
Wesley Hunt (R)	$1,179,134	$935,226	$2,018,741
Source: Federal Election Commission

==== Results ====
Republican primary results
Party	Candidate	Votes	%
Republican	Wesley Hunt (incumbent)	62,340	100.0
Total votes		62,340	100.0

=== Democratic primary ===
==== Nominee ====
- Melissa McDonough, realtor

==== Eliminated in primary ====
- Gion Thomas, executive recruiter

==== Disqualified ====
- Cameron Campbell, motivational speaker

==== Endorsements ====
Melissa McDonough

Organizations

- Houston LGBTQ+ Political Caucus
- National Women's Political Caucus

Labor unions

- Texas AFL-CIO
- United Auto Workers

Newspapers

- Houston Chronicle

==== Fundraising ====
Campaign finance reports as of February 14, 2024
Candidate	Raised	Spent	Cash on hand
Gion Thomas (D)	$13,879 (Note: $11,003 of this total was self-funded by Thomas)	$11,042	$2,837
Melissa McDonough (D)	$91,058 (Note: $77,280 of this total was self-funded by McDonough)	$86,138	$6,700
Source: Federal Election Commission

==== Results ====
Democratic primary results
Party	Candidate	Votes	%
Democratic	Melissa McDonough	18,486	82.5
Democratic	Gion Thomas	3,910	17.5
Total votes		22,396	100.0

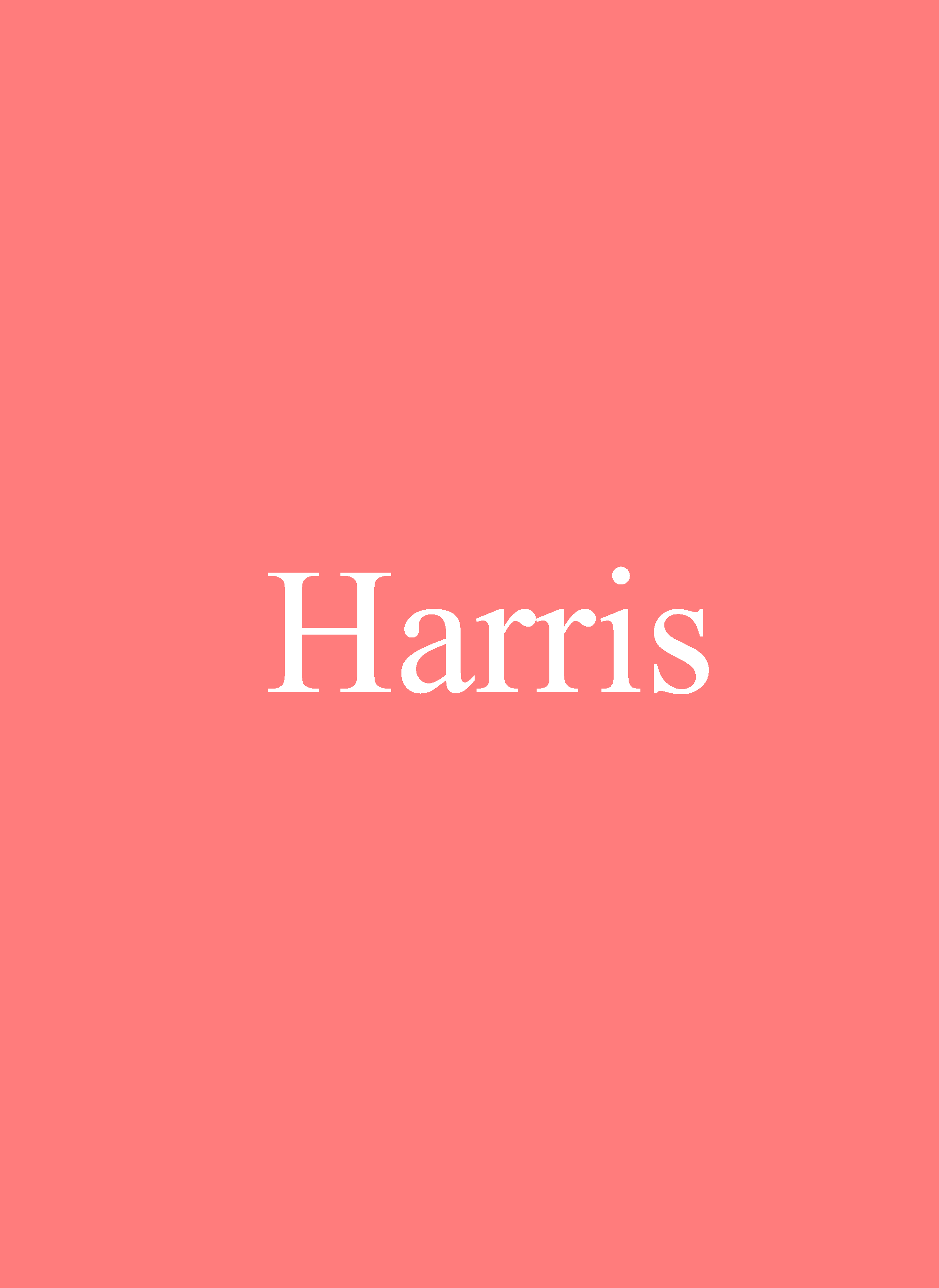
Cartogram of Texas' 38th congressional district

=== General election ===
==== Predictions ====
Source	Ranking	As of
The Cook Political Report	Solid R	February 2, 2023
Inside Elections	Solid R	March 10, 2023
Sabato's Crystal Ball	Safe R	February 23, 2023
Elections Daily	Safe R	September 7, 2023
CNalysis	Solid R	November 16, 2023
Decision Desk HQ	Safe R	June 14, 2024

==== Results ====
2024 Texas's 38th congressional district election
Party	Candidate	Votes	%
Republican	Wesley Hunt (incumbent)	215,030	62.73
Democratic	Melissa McDonough	127,640	37.24
Democratic	Write-ins	94	0.03
Total votes		342,764	100.0
Republican hold			

==== By county ====
County	Wesley Hunt Republican		Melissa McDonough Democratic		Various candidates Other parties		Margin		Total votes cast
County	#	%	#	%	#	%	#	%	Total votes cast
Harris	215,030	62.73%	127,640	37.24%	94	0.03%	87,390	25.50%	342,764
Totals	215,030	62.73%	127,640	37.24%	94	0.03%	87,390	25.50%	342,764

== See also ==
- 2024 Texas elections

== Notes ==
Partisan clients
