= Giffords =

American gun violence prevention organization

- Formation: 2013
- Headquarters: Washington, D.C.
- Key people: Gabby Giffords; Emma Brown
- Affiliations: Giffords Law Center to Prevent Gun Violence
- Revenue: $17.6 million (2024)
- Website: giffords.org
- Formerly called: Americans for Responsible Solutions

Giffords (stylized in all caps) is an American advocacy and research organization focused on preventing gun violence. The organization draws its name from one of its co-founders, Gabby Giffords, a former Democratic member of the U.S. House of Representatives. Rep. Giffords was shot along with 18 others at a constituent meeting in Tucson in 2011. The organization has three parts: a 501(c)(4) lobbying arm, a 501(c)(3) research arm and law center, and a super PAC. It was previously known in a different configuration as Americans for Responsible Solutions.

== Mission ==
Giffords has written that when she and her husband, Mark Kelly, launched the organization, they "wanted to prove that it's possible to stand up for the Second Amendment while also standing up for stronger gun laws that keep us safe." The mission of the organization is to shift American gun culture through information and to challenge the gun industry and lobby, all while changing U.S. policies to support safer gun laws. It is known for its centrist, bipartisan approach and aim to organize unlikely allies, such as gun owners.

== History ==
The organization known as Giffords began as a nonprofit and super PAC Americans for Responsible Solutions which Giffords launched with her husband, retired astronaut and U.S. Navy aviator (and future United States Senator) Mark Kelly in 2013 shortly after the Sandy Hook Elementary School shooting. In its first electoral cycle, Kelly said the organization aimed to devote as much money to support candidates advocating for gun safety laws as the National Rifle Association of America (NRA) had spent in the 2012 election. In 2016, ARS merged with the Law Center to Prevent Gun Violence, adding legal expertise and state-level research on gun laws to its work. In 2017, the group changed its name from Americans for Responsible Solutions to Giffords.

== Gun safety advocacy ==
Giffords works on a range of issues to curb gun violence including requiring background checks for guns purchased in private sales and at gun shows, reducing interstate gun trafficking, conducting gun violence research, and regulating dangerous hardware like bump stocks and auto sears. It has played a role in passing more than 700 new gun laws in 49 states and Washington, D.C.

Giffords’ executive director is Emma Brown, a political advisor and former Democratic campaign manager.

== Affiliated programs and initiatives ==
Through the Giffords Law Center to Prevent Gun Violence, the organization releases the Annual Gun Law Scorecard, a website that evaluates the "relative strength or weakness" of gun laws in each state as well as the rate of gun deaths, assigning grades to each state and demonstrating the effectiveness of gun laws at reducing gun deaths. Giffords Law Center also files amicus curiae briefs and takes other legal action to protect, enforce and strengthen gun regulations.

Giffords has also launched a number of state chapters, including Giffords Florida and Giffords Texas.

== Electoral activity ==
=== 2014 election cycle ===
Giffords supports candidates with gun violence prevention in their platforms through its super PAC. The PAC spent $8 million in the 2014 election cycle on independent expenditures for and against 20 candidates. The largest share of the group's spending was in the race for the House seat previously held by Gabrielle Giffords in Arizona's second district. The group supported the incumbent, Democrat and Giffords's former aide Ron Barber, against Republican Martha McSally. McSally narrowly won the seat. Overall during the 2014 election cycle, the PAC devoted $4.9 million to oppose Republican candidates, $2.4 million in support of Democratic candidates and $860,000 in support of Republican candidates.

=== 2016 election cycle ===
In 2016, Giffords spent more than $2 million supporting New Hampshire Democrat Maggie Hassan in her bid to unseat Republican Sen. Kelly Ayotte, who had voted against expanding background checks for gun purchases. Hassan won the seat. The PAC also endorsed Republicans including two senate candidates, Pat Toomey of Pennsylvania and Mark Kirk of Illinois. Giffords and Kelly wrote that Toomey and Kirk "broke from the gun lobby" to support a bill to close the gun-show loophole. They also supported the Democratic candidate in two Senate races as well as a handful of House contests. Overall, Giffords spent $2.7 million on political races in 2016.

=== 2017 statewide races ===
Giffords supported two gubernatorial candidates in 2017 who supported stronger gun laws. Ralph Northam in Virginia and Phil Murphy in New Jersey, both Democrats, won their races.

=== 2018 election cycle ===
In 2018, the PAC continued to endorse and support candidates on both sides of the aisle, including three Republican candidates they identified by focusing on legislation that broke with Republican party line on guns laws. The organization particularly faced criticism over its endorsement of incumbent Republican Leonard Lance in New Jersey's 7th District over Democratic challenger Tom Malinowski. It was noted that both Lance and Malinowski supported gun legislation favored by Giffords. In the 2018 election Malinowski unseated Lance as Democrats took back the majority in the House of Representatives.

As of June 2018, the group had raised nearly $13 million and had donated more than $177,000 directly to federal candidates. As part of its 2018 campaign work, Giffords worked with VoteVets to rally support for seven congressional candidates who support stronger gun laws. All seven are Democrats. The group also dedicated millions to successfully unseat four NRA-backed incumbent House members.

Commentators and editorial pages noted that work by Giffords and other gun violence prevention organizations had been a powerful element in the 2018 election cycle. The Washington Post editorial board cited the work of Giffords and wrote that the election marked a "shift in the politics of gun control; no longer is it a third rail to be avoided at all costs." NPR reported that 95 candidates endorsed by Giffords PAC won House seats. According to the AP VoteCast election day survey, 61% of voters said gun laws should be more strict.

=== 2019 state races ===
Giffords was active in the state-wide races in Virginia in 2019, supporting over 40 candidates for the Virginia House of Delegates and State Senate, both of which flipped Democratic and subsequently passed a range of new gun safety laws.

=== 2020 election cycle ===
In 2019, Giffords co-hosted the first-ever presidential forum on gun safety, attended by nine leading Democratic candidates for president and emceed by Craig Melvin of NBC and MSNBC. Giffords went on to support Joe Biden following his clinching of the nomination, with co-founder Gabby Giffords filming a video played at the Democratic National Convention, which was virtual due to the COVID-19 pandemic.

In the Senate, Giffords supported John Hickenlooper of Colorado against an incumbent backed by the NRA, investing in digital and television advertisements and hosting local events.

Giffords led a virtual tour, the Road to Universal Background Checks, and endorsed over 300 candidates for a range of offices in 34 states, with 256 candidates winning their races.

=== 2022 election cycle ===
In 2022, Giffords again supported hundreds of state and local candidates pledging to advocate for stronger gun laws. It invested a total of $10 million across the country, including over $5 million in ad campaigns in the Colorado and Pennsylvania Senate races, $1 million for its new Giffords Florida program, over $350,000 indirect donations to campaigns and state parties, and a six-figure investment in the successful passage of Oregon Ballot Initiative 114. In total Giffords endorsed 288 candidates in 2022, with an over 84% win rate. Successful candidates backed by Giffords include Senators John Fetterman, Michael Bennet, and Raphael Warnock and Governors Josh Shapiro, Gretchen Whitmer, Tim Walz, Tony Evers, Wes Moore, and Maura Healey.

=== 2024 election cycle ===
In 2024, Giffords committed a reported $15 million to supporting Kamala Harris and gun safety champions who had pledged to advocate for gun safety laws and gun violence prevention. According to NBC News, the spending by Giffords “will cover paid TV and digital ads, direct mail (in English and Spanish), new polls to help allies hone their messages and the deployment of staffers and surrogates.” Giffords concentrated its resources in battleground states, including Michigan and Arizona, and also allocated spending to competitive US House of Representatives races in California and New York. In total, Giffords backed 341 total candidates for local, state, and federal office, with 294 of them winning their elections.

Co-founder Gabrielle Giffords again gave a prime-time address at the Democratic National Convention, urging Democrats to support gun safety as she did in 2020, 2016, and 2012. She also made appearances at dozens of campaign events across the country in support of gun safety candidates.

Giffords launched its inaugural Gun Safety Champion Award to “spotlight up-and-coming candidates for elected office across the country who have made preventing gun violence their top priority.” Winners included Lateefah Simon (candidate for US House, CA-12), Brian Williams (candidate for US House, TX-32), Yvette Valdés Smith (candidate for New York Senate, SD-39), and Averie Bishop (candidate for Texas House, HD-112).

== Other work ==
In addition to endorsing and supporting state and federal candidates and lobbying for stronger gun laws, Giffords has spoken out about the need to intensify the government and electorate's response to outbursts of gun violence. Immediately following the 2017 mass shooting in Las Vegas, co-founder Giffords issued a statement that she was praying for her former colleagues in Congress to "find the courage it will take to make progress on the challenging issues of gun violence." In a press conference on the steps of the U.S. Congress, co-founder Mark Kelly echoed the call for more action, saying, "All we're hearing is thoughts and prayers...Your thoughts and prayers aren't going to stop the next shooting."

The group has also participated in a range of state and national advocacy campaigns and events. In March 2018, when survivors of the mass shooting at Marjory Stoneman Douglas High School in Parkland, Florida organized the March for Our Lives, Giffords helped bring more than 200 people from Parkland to participate. The organization has helped link local and regional groups into a campaign to register voters in the hopes of electing lawmakers who support gun safety laws. Giffords has also brought together former military commanders and other veterans to urge political leaders to address America's 'gun violence crisis.'
