= Committee on Transportation =

Committee on Transportation can refer to:

- United States House Committee on Transportation and Infrastructure
- United States Senate Committee on Commerce, Science, and Transportation
- United States Senate Committee on Transportation Routes to the Seaboard
- National Transportation Safety Committee
- United States Senate Select Committee on the Transportation and Sale of Meat Products
- United States Senate Environment Subcommittee on Transportation and Infrastructure
- Standing Committee on Transport, Tourism and Culture (Parliament of India)
