= Giffords Law Center to Prevent Gun Violence =

American political action organization

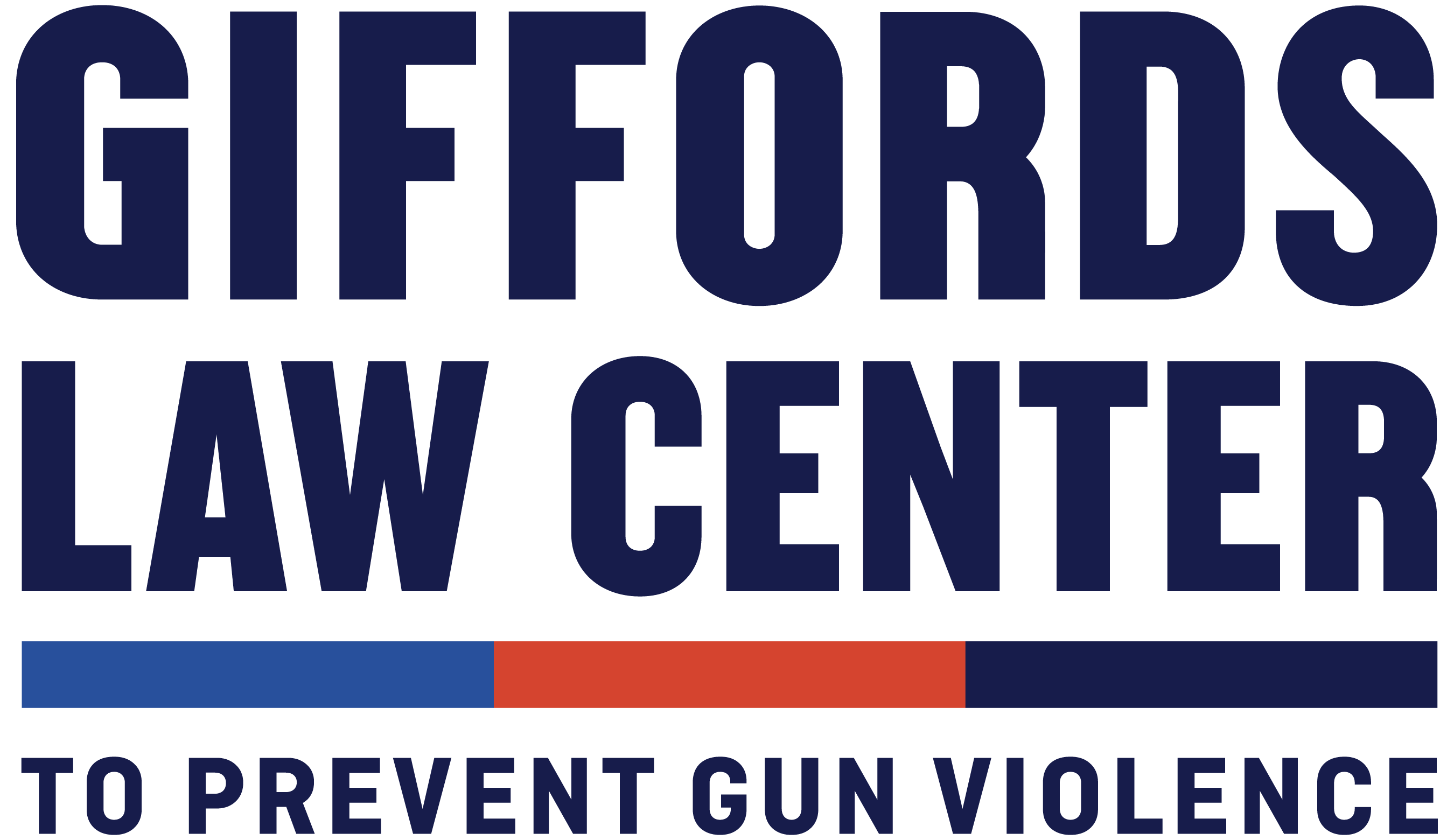
- Formation: July 1993; 33 years ago (as Legal Community Against Violence)
- Founded at: San Francisco, California, United States
- Type: 501(c)(3)
- Headquarters: San Francisco, California, United States
- Key people: Gabby Giffords; Emma Brown
- Affiliations: Giffords
- Revenue: $11.5 million (2024)
- Expenses: $12.2 million (2024)
- Website: Giffords.org
- Formerly called: Legal Community Against Violence, Law Center to Prevent Gun Violence

GIFFORDS Law Center to Prevent Gun Violence, previously known as the Legal Community Against Violence and the Law Center to Prevent Gun Violence, is a national public interest law center and nonprofit organization that promotes gun violence prevention and gun safety laws in the United States. GIFFORDS Law Center publishes information about gun laws and gun control. It is the legal, research, and policy arm of GIFFORDS, the national gun safety organization founded and led by former Congresswoman Gabby Giffords.

GIFFORDS Law Center has conducted litigation against the gun industry, filed amicus curiae briefs supporting gun safety laws in Second Amendment cases, and helped secure government funding for community violence intervention programs. GIFFORDS Law Center houses a comprehensive database of state and federal gun laws and Second Amendment jurisprudence. The organization offers legal assistance to public officials and publishes research on the effectiveness of gun laws and statistics pertaining to gun violence.

GIFFORDS Law Center's executive director is Emma Brown, a political advisor and Democratic campaign manager.

== History ==
Previous logo

The Legal Community Against Violence was established in the wake of the July 1, 1993, 101 California Street shooting, during which a gunman entered the offices of law firm Petit & Martin and shot fourteen people, killing eight. Former Petit & Martin partners John Heisse and Chuck Erlich formed the nonprofit organization along with other San Francisco Bay Area legal professionals shortly after the shooting to help local communities pass their own gun violence prevention ordinances.

Initially focusing on the local regulation of firearms in California, LCAV supported the passage of the Brady Bill and the federal assault weapons ban in 1993. The organization's volunteer lawyers provided legal consultation to the city of West Hollywood when it was sued by the National Rifle Association of America (NRA) in January 1996 for banning Saturday night special handguns. The lawsuit was dismissed in November 1996.

Over time, LCAV expanded its activity to assist legislators and advocates in states across the country in drafting and passing gun safety laws. It also provided pro bono support to a range of local communities defending their gun laws from lawsuits by the NRA and other gun lobby organizations. The organization expanded its Second Amendment program, providing amicus curiae briefs in key gun rights cases, including the Supreme Court cases District of Columbia v. Heller in 2008 and McDonald v. City of Chicago in 2010. GIFFORDS Law Center attorneys provided testimony in Congressional hearings about gun violence and gun laws and regularly appeared in the media as experts on American gun laws. In 2013, the organization changed its name to the Law Center to Prevent Gun Violence.

Following the Sandy Hook School shooting in December 2012, the Law Center expanded its activity in state legislation, contributing to the passage of over 600 new gun safety laws in 49 states and the District of Columbia.

In 2016, the Law Center to Prevent Gun Violence merged with Americans for Responsible Solutions (ARS), a nonprofit gun control organization led by former Congresswoman Gabby Giffords and Navy combat veteran and retired NASA astronaut Captain Mark Kelly. The organization changed its name to GIFFORDS Law Center to Prevent Gun Violence in 2017. ARS was formed in the weeks following the Sandy Hook Elementary School shooting of December 14, 2012. The organization had revenues of $21.3 million in 2014.

Giffords and Kelly said they sought to reduce gun violence by matching the gun lobby in its reach and resources. In a network news interview, Kelly said he went through a background check to buy a gun at a store and that private firearms sales should also require checks. Three days later, the Wall Street Journal said that Americans for Responsible Solutions and Mayors Against Illegal Guns were "emerging as key voices in the gun control effort."

In 2019, GIFFORDS Law Center sued the Federal Election Commission, alleging the regulatory agency failed to take action against the National Rifle Association for alleged campaign finance violations. The lawsuit, filed by GIFFORDS and the Campaign Legal Center, states the FEC did not respond to multiple complaints accusing the NRA of using shell organizations to donate more than the legal amount to the campaigns of President Trump and six Republican Senate candidates. In response, the NRA stated “[t]his latest effort by Giffords and the Campaign Legal Center is a frivolous lawsuit based on a frivolous complaint.”

Following the FEC's lack of response, GIFFORDS Law Center filed a federal lawsuit directly against the NRA in November 2021. As of February 2024, the case is pending.

In recent years, GIFFORDS Law Center has increased its litigation activity, either filing or supporting lawsuits against ghost gun companies, social media corporations, and the gun industry for contributions to gun violence.

In October 2021, GIFFORDS Law Center launched an affiliated program focused on promoting community-based solutions to gun violence in American cities. Called GIFFORDS Center for Violence Intervention, this program began hosting the annual Community Violence Intervention Conference, the largest gathering of community violence experts and advocates in the United States.

GIFFORDS Law Center and its affiliated organization, GIFFORDS, was a key player in the Biden administration’s efforts against gun violence, providing research and policy suggestions that contributed to 2022’s Bipartisan Safer Communities Act, the administration’s numerous executive actions on guns, and the formation of the White House Office of Gun Violence Prevention in 2023.

In 2024, GIFFORDS Law Center settled a major lawsuit against ghost gun company Polymer80 on behalf of Philadelphia, and undertook similar litigation in other parts of the country. In 2024, GIFFORDS Law Center was also active in the Supreme Court case United States vs. Rahimi, which was decided in favor of GIFFORDS Law Center’s position.

== Reports and state rankings ==
GIFFORDS Law Center provides comparisons of state gun laws online, and annually releases the Annual Gun Law Scorecard, a report that ranks and measures individual states' gun death rates in correlation to their gun laws, assigning letter grades to each state. According to the organization, its research shows there are fewer gun deaths in states with comprehensive gun safety laws.

== See also ==
- Giffords
- Gabby Giffords
- Gun violence in the United States
