= Cassandra Hernandez =

American politician

Cassandra Garcia Hernandez
- Hernandez at a memorial for the victims of the 2026 Dallas apartment explosion

Member of the Texas House of Representatives from the 115th district
- Incumbent
- Assumed office January 14, 2025
- Preceded by: Julie Johnson

Personal details
- Party: Democratic
- Education: University of Houston (BBA) South Texas College of Law (JD)
- Website: Campaign website

Cassandra Garcia Hernandez is an American politician who is a member of the Texas House of Representatives for the 115th district after winning the 2024 election.

Garcia Hernandez is a Dallas attorney and a domestic violence survivor. She has served on various boards of Catholic charities. She is of Mexican descent.

== Early life and education ==
Garcia Hernandez was born in Hereford, Texas, a town 48 miles southwest miles of Amarillo. She received a bachelor's degree in business from the University of Houston and later received her J.D. degree from South Texas College of Law.

== Texas House of Representatives ==
Garcia Hernandez first ran for the Texas House for the 70th District in 2022, but was defeated in the Democratic primary election by Mihaela Plesa. In 2024, Garcia Hernandez ran and was elected to the 115th District. She succeeded Julie Johnson, who retired to run for Congress.

Garcia Hernandez was appointed by House Speaker Dustin Burrows to serve as the Vice-Chair of the sub-committee on State-Federal Relations.

=== Committee Assignments (89th Legislature) ===
- Committee on Appropriations
  - Sub-committee on Articles VI, VII, & VIII
- Committee on Intergovernmental Affairs
  - Sub-committee on State-Federal Relations (Vice-Chair)

== Election History ==
=== 2024 ===
2024 Texas House of Representatives election: House District 115
Party	Candidate	Votes	%	±%
Democratic	Cassandra Garcia Hernandez	37,692	54.3	−
Republican	John Jun	31,709	45.7	−
