= 2026 Dallas apartment explosion =

Explosion and fire in Dallas, Texas

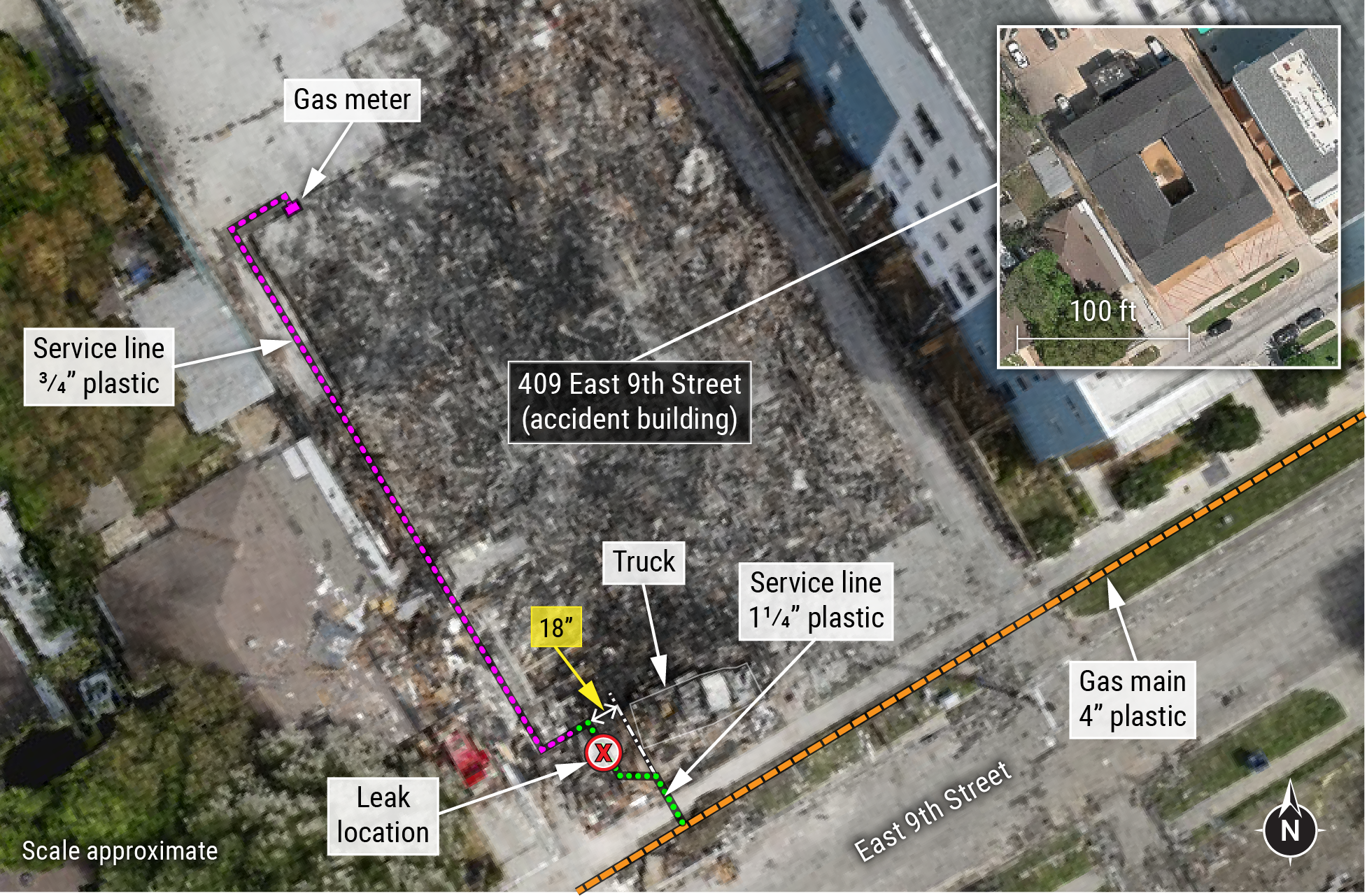
- An NTSB drone photograph of the scene
- Date: 28 May 2026; 5 months ago
- Time: 12:45 p.m. (CDT)
- Venue: The Clyde
- Location: Dallas, Texas; 32.7487°N 96.8191°W
- Type: Gas explosion, fire
- Cause: Gas leak
- Deaths: 3
- Injuries: 5

On May 28, 2026, a natural gas explosion and five-alarm fire occurred at The Clyde, an apartment building in the Oak Cliff neighborhood of Dallas, Texas, United States, killing three people and injuring five others.

== Background ==
The Clyde was a two-story apartment complex located at the intersection of Patton Avenue and East 9th Street. The building was built in 1964 and had 23 units, of which 19 were occupied by families.

== Explosion ==
The explosion happened at 12:45 p.m. CDT, with over 115 firefighters responding to the scene. A Waymo car blocked the road, temporarily stopping first responders from reaching the scene. The building was completely destroyed. Search and rescue operations using drones, cadaver dogs and teams lasted until the afternoon of May 29, when the search was completed.

== Victims ==
Initially, it was reported that there were multiple fatalities and injuries, with 11 people reported missing. Officials later confirmed three people were killed — two in one unit and one in another, and five others were injured. The victims were identified as 79-year-old Sylvia Josie Collins, 37-year-old Marisol Pérez and her 18-month-old son Erik Pérez Sanchez Jr. No first responders were injured. Dallas Fire-Rescue said everyone was accounted for.

== Aftermath ==
From left to right: Rep. Rafael Anchia, Sen. Royce West, Rep. Jessica Gonzalez, and Rep. Cassandra Garcia Hernandez, at a memorial service for victims of the 2026 apartment explosion.

Soil testers drilled in the area of the explosion. Multiple lawsuits were filed against Atmos Energy, alleging that the company and apartment managers failed to monitor dangerous conditions and notify residents of a gas leak. An attorney for the complex said Barba Drilling is to blame. Austin Street Center partnered with the Communities Foundation of Texas and other groups to provide six months of rent and other support for families displaced from the explosion.

== Investigation ==
The National Transportation Safety Board (NTSB) confirmed they are investigating the explosion.
