= United States Senate Environment and Public Works Subcommittee on Transportation Safety, Infrastructure Security, and Water Quality =

The U.S. Senate Environment and Public Works Subcommittee on Subcommittee on Transportation Safety, Infrastructure Security, and Water Quality was one of six subcommittees of the U.S. Senate Committee on Environment and Public Works.

== Jurisdiction ==
The subcommittee's jurisdiction includes:

- Drinking Water, Chemical, and Wastewater Security
- Clean Water Act, including wetlands
- Safe Drinking Water Act
- Coastal Zone Management Act
- Invasive Species
- Transportation Safety
- Outer Continental Shelf Lands (environmental concerns)

== History ==
The subcommittee was created in 2007 during committee organization of the 110th Congress when several areas of jurisdiction were transferred from other subcommittees, particularly the Subcommittee on Transportation and Infrastructure.

== Members, 110th Congress ==
During the 110 Congress, the subcommittee was chaired by Frank Lautenberg of New Jersey, and the ranking member while David Vitter of Louisiana served as a ranking member.

Majority
| Member | State |
|---|---|
| Frank Lautenberg, Chairman | New Jersey |
| Ben Cardin | Maryland |
| Amy Klobuchar | Minnesota |
| Sheldon Whitehouse | Rhode Island |
| Barbara Boxer, ex officio | California |

Minority
| Member | State |
|---|---|
| David Vitter, Ranking Member | Louisiana |
| Kit Bond | Missouri |
| Larry Craig | Idaho |
| James M. Inhofe, ex officio | Oklahoma |
