= United States Senate Environment Subcommittee on Fisheries, Wildlife, and Water =

The U.S. Senate Environment and Public Works Subcommittee on Fisheries, Wildlife, and Water is one of four subcommittees of the U.S. Senate Committee on Environment and Public Works.

== Jurisdiction ==
- Fish and Wildlife Issues
  - U.S. Fish and Wildlife Service
  - National Wildlife Refuges
  - Endangered Species Act (ESA)
  - Lacey Act
  - Pittman-Robertson Federal Aid in Wildlife Restoration Act (Pittman-Robertson)
  - Coastal Barrier Resources Act
  - Invasive Species
  - Sportsmen's issues
  - Fisheries and wildlife
- Water Issues
  - Clean Water Act, including wetlands
  - Safe Drinking Water Act
  - Ocean dumping
  - Water pollution
  - Environmental aspects of Outer Continental Shelf Lands

== Members, 119th Congress ==
Majority	Minority
Pete Ricketts, Nebraska, Chair; Kevin Cramer, North Dakota; Cynthia Lummis, Wyoming; Dan Sullivan, Alaska; John Boozman, Arkansas; Jon Husted, Ohio	Adam Schiff, California, Ranking Member; Bernie Sanders, Vermont; Mark Kelly, Arizona; Alex Padilla, California; Angela Alsobrooks, Maryland
Ex officio
Shelley Moore Capito, West Virginia	Tom Carper, Delaware

== Historical subcommittee rosters ==
=== 118th Congress ===
Majority	Minority
Alex Padilla, California, Chair; Ben Cardin, Maryland; Sheldon Whitehouse, Rhode Island; Ed Markey, Massachusetts; Debbie Stabenow, Michigan; Mark Kelly, Arizona	Cynthia Lummis, Wyoming, Ranking Member; Pete Ricketts, Nebraska; Kevin Cramer, North Dakota; John Boozman, Arkansas; Dan Sullivan, Alaska
Ex officio
Tom Carper, Delaware	Shelley Moore Capito, West Virginia
