= Emma Brown (political advisor) =

American political advisor and advocate

- Education: Colby College, (BA)
- Occupation: American Political Advisor and Advocate
- Known For: Democratic Campaign Manager, Executive Director of GIFFORDS
- Awards: TIME100 Next

Emma Brown is an American political advisor and advocate. She is the current executive director of GIFFORDS, an advocacy and research organization founded by Gabby Giffords that focuses on preventing gun violence in the United States. She managed U.S. Senator Mark Kelly’s successful 2022 reelection campaign.

== Early life and education ==
Brown was raised in Alexandria, Virginia. She graduated from Colby College in 2016 with a degree in Government and English.

== Career ==
Brown began her career organizing in Ohio for former Secretary of State Hillary Clinton’s 2016 presidential campaign. She has cited President Donald Trump’s Republican presidential nomination victory in 2016 as motivating her entry into politics.

In 2017, Brown worked as campaign manager for former Virginia State Delegate Wendy Gooditis’s first bid for office against three-term incumbent Republican Randy Minchew. Gooditis won the race, for which Brown was named the 2018 “State Campaign Manager of the Year” by the American Association of Political Consultants. In 2018, Brown served as campaign manager for Democrat Betsy Londrigan’s campaign for the U.S. House in Illinois’s 13th Congressional District. Londrigan was narrowly defeated in the general election by incumbent Rodney Davis.

In 2020, Brown served as deputy campaign manager for former astronaut Mark Kelly, who successfully ran against Martha McSally in a special election for the late Arizona Senator John McCain’s seat. She also served as the coordinated campaign director for Joe Biden’s presidential campaign in Arizona, which won the state by 10,457 votes.

In 2022, Brown served as campaign manager for Mark Kelly’s campaign for a full Senate term against Republican venture capitalist Blake Masters. The campaign raised over $100 million and resulted in Kelly's reelection.

In 2024, Brown became the executive director of GIFFORDS, the nonprofit gun violence prevention advocacy organization founded by U.S. Representative Gabrielle Giffords. In this role, she oversees organizational strategy, advocacy campaigns, and political outreach efforts aimed at reducing gun violence in the United States.

In 2024, Brown was named to Time Magazine’s “Time100 Next” list of emerging leaders across the globe. Senator Mark Kelly wrote the entry in support of Brown.

In 2026, Brown was recognized on the American Association of Political Consultants’ 40 Under 40 list.
