= United States Senate Environment Subcommittee on Transportation and Infrastructure =

The U.S. Senate Environment and Public Works Subcommittee on Transportation and Infrastructure is a subcommittee of the U.S. Senate Committee on Environment and Public Works.

== Jurisdiction ==
- Transportation and Infrastructure Issues
  - Federal Highway Administration
  - Highway Program
  - Construction and maintenance of highways
  - Public works, bridges, and dams
  - General Services Administration
  - Public Buildings and improved grounds of the United States generally, including Federal Buildings in the District of Columbia
  - Green Building Standards
- Water Issues
  - Army Corps of Engineers (Civil Works)
  - Water Resources Development Act
  - National Dam Safety Program
  - Flood control and improvements of rivers and harbors, including environmental aspects of deepwater ports
  - Water resources
- Regional Economic Development
  - Economic Development Administration
  - Appalachian Regional Commission
  - Northern Border Regional Commission
  - Delta Regional Authority
  - Mississippi River Commission
- Transportation
- Federal Highway Administration

During committee organization for the 110th Congress, the subcommittee's responsibility over transportation safety and security issues was transferred to a new Subcommittee on Transportation Safety, Infrastructure Security, and Water Quality.

== Members, 119th Congress ==
Majority	Minority
Kevin Cramer, North Dakota, Chair; Cynthia Lummis, Wyoming; John Curtis, Utah; Lindsey Graham, South Carolina (until July 11, 2026); Dan Sullivan, Alaska; Pete Ricketts, Nebraska; Roger Wicker, Mississippi; John Boozman, Arkansas; Darline Graham, South Carolina (from July 21, 2026)	Angela Alsobrooks, Maryland, Ranking Member; Jeff Merkley, Oregon; Ed Markey, Massachusetts; Mark Kelly, Arizona; Alex Padilla, California; Adam Schiff, California; Lisa Blunt Rochester, Delaware
Ex officio
Shelley Moore Capito, West Virginia	Sheldon Whitehouse, Rhode Island

== Historical subcommittee rosters ==
=== 118th Congress ===
Majority	Minority
Mark Kelly, Arizona, Chair; Bernie Sanders, Vermont; Ed Markey, Massachusetts; Jeff Merkley, Oregon; John Fetterman, Pennsylvania; Debbie Stabenow, Michigan; Ben Cardin, Maryland; Alex Padilla, California	Kevin Cramer, North Dakota, Ranking Member; Cynthia Lummis, Wyoming; John Boozman, Arkansas; Roger Wicker, Mississippi; Lindsey Graham, South Carolina; Markwayne Mullin, Oklahoma; Pete Ricketts, Nebraska
Ex officio
Tom Carper, Delaware	Shelley Moore Capito, West Virginia
