= Mark Kelly =

American politician, astronaut and naval officer (born 1964)

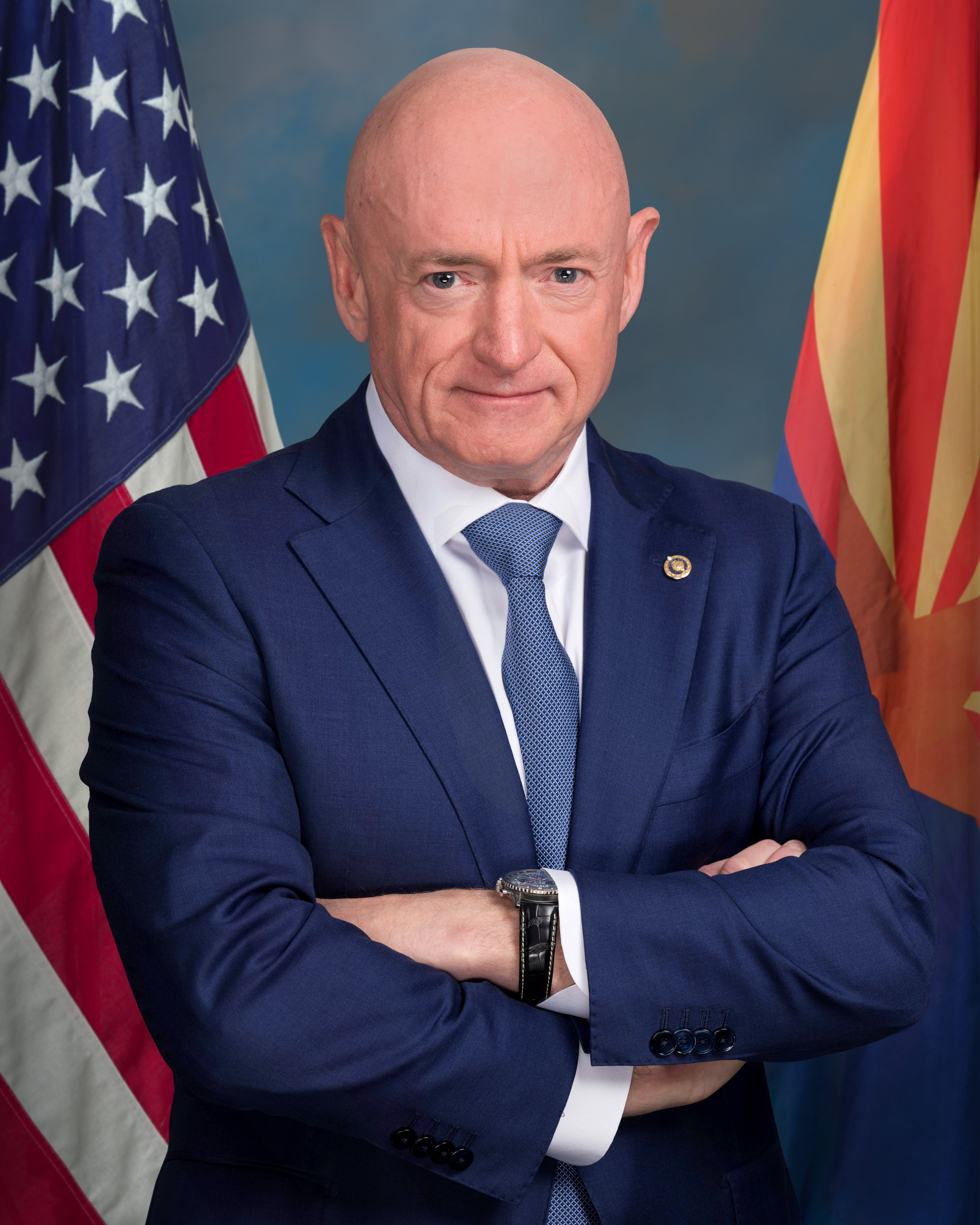
- Official portrait, 2025

United States Senator from Arizona
- Incumbent
- Assumed office December 2, 2020 Serving with Ruben Gallego
- Preceded by: Martha McSally

Personal details
- Born: Mark Edward Kelly; February 21, 1964 (age 62) Orange, New Jersey, U.S.
- Party: Democratic
- Spouses: Amelia Babis (m. 1989; div. 2004); Gabby Giffords (m. 2007)
- Children: 2
- Relatives: Scott Kelly (identical twin brother)
- Education: United States Merchant Marine Academy (BS); Naval Postgraduate School (MS)
- Website: Senate website Campaign website

Military service
- Allegiance: United States
- Branch/service: United States Navy
- Years of service: 1986–2011
- Rank: Captain
- Battles/wars: Gulf War
- Space career

NASA astronaut
- Time in space: 54d 2h 4m
- Selection: NASA Group 16 (1996)
- Missions: STS-108; STS-121; STS-124; STS-134
- Mission insignia
- Retired: October 1, 2011
- Kelly's voice Kelly questions witnesses on water affordability. Recorded May 31, 2023

Mark Edward Kelly (born February 21, 1964) is an American politician and a retired astronaut and naval officer. He is the senior United States senator from Arizona, a seat he has held since 2020. He is a member of the Democratic Party.

Kelly flew combat missions during the Gulf War as a naval aviator before being selected as a NASA Space Shuttle pilot in 1996. His identical twin brother, Scott Kelly, also became a NASA astronaut that year. Mark flew his first space mission in 2001 as pilot of STS-108, then piloted STS-121 in 2006, and commanded STS-124 in 2008 and STS-134 (the final mission of Space Shuttle Endeavour) in 2011. In January 2011, Kelly's wife, then-Arizona Representative Gabby Giffords, was shot and nearly killed in an assassination attempt in Arizona. Kelly retired from the Navy and NASA that October. In 2013, Kelly and Giffords founded a nonprofit political action committee, Americans for Responsible Solutions (later merged into Giffords), which campaigned for gun control measures like universal background checks.

Kelly was first elected to the Senate in a 2020 special election triggered by the death of Senator John McCain. He defeated incumbent Republican Martha McSally in the general election, becoming the first Democrat to win the seat since 1962. Kelly was reelected to a full term in 2022.

== Early life and education ==
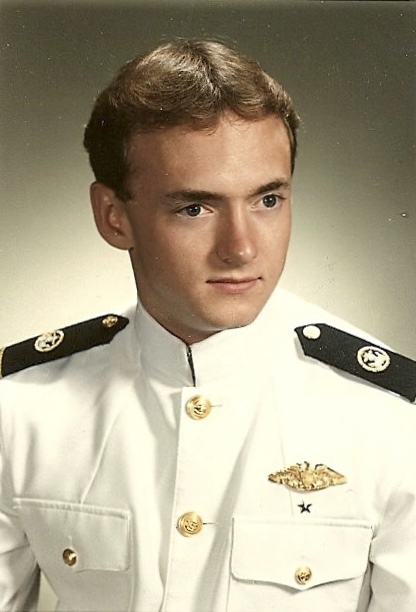
Kelly's 1986 university portrait

Mark Kelly was born on February 21, 1964, in Orange, New Jersey, and raised in West Orange, New Jersey. He and his identical twin brother, Scott Kelly, are sons of Richard and Patricia (née McAvoy) Kelly, both police officers. Kelly is of Irish, Polish, and English descent. Kelly graduated from Mountain High School in 1982. In 1986, he took highest honors in a marine engineering and nautical science BSc from the United States Merchant Marine Academy. In 1994, he received a MSc in aeronautical engineering from the U.S. Naval Postgraduate School.

== Naval career (1987–2011) ==
In December 1987, Kelly became a naval aviator and received initial training on the Grumman A-6E Intruder attack aircraft. He was then assigned to Attack Squadron 115 (VA-115) at NAF Atsugi in Kanagawa, Japan. He was deployed twice with VA-115 to the Persian Gulf aboard the aircraft carrier USS Midway, which was homeported at Naval Station Yokosuka in Yokosuka, Japan. During Operation Desert Storm, Kelly flew 39 combat missions. After the Gulf War, Kelly received his master's degree and then attended U.S. Naval Test Pilot School from 1993 to 1994. As a naval aviator and test pilot, he has logged over 5,000 hours in more than 50 different aircraft and trapped over 375 carrier landings.

During his Navy career, Kelly received two Defense Superior Service Medals; one Legion of Merit; two Distinguished Flying Crosses; four Air Medals (two individual/two strike flight) with Combat "V"; two Navy Commendation Medals, (one with combat "V"); one Navy Achievement Medal; two Southwest Asia Service Medals; one Navy Expeditionary Medal; two Sea Service Deployment Ribbons; a NASA Distinguished Service Medal; and an Overseas Service Ribbon.

On June 21, 2011, Kelly announced his retirement from both the Navy and NASA, effective October 1, citing Gabby Giffords's needs during her recovery from the attempt on her life that January.

== NASA career (1996–2011) ==
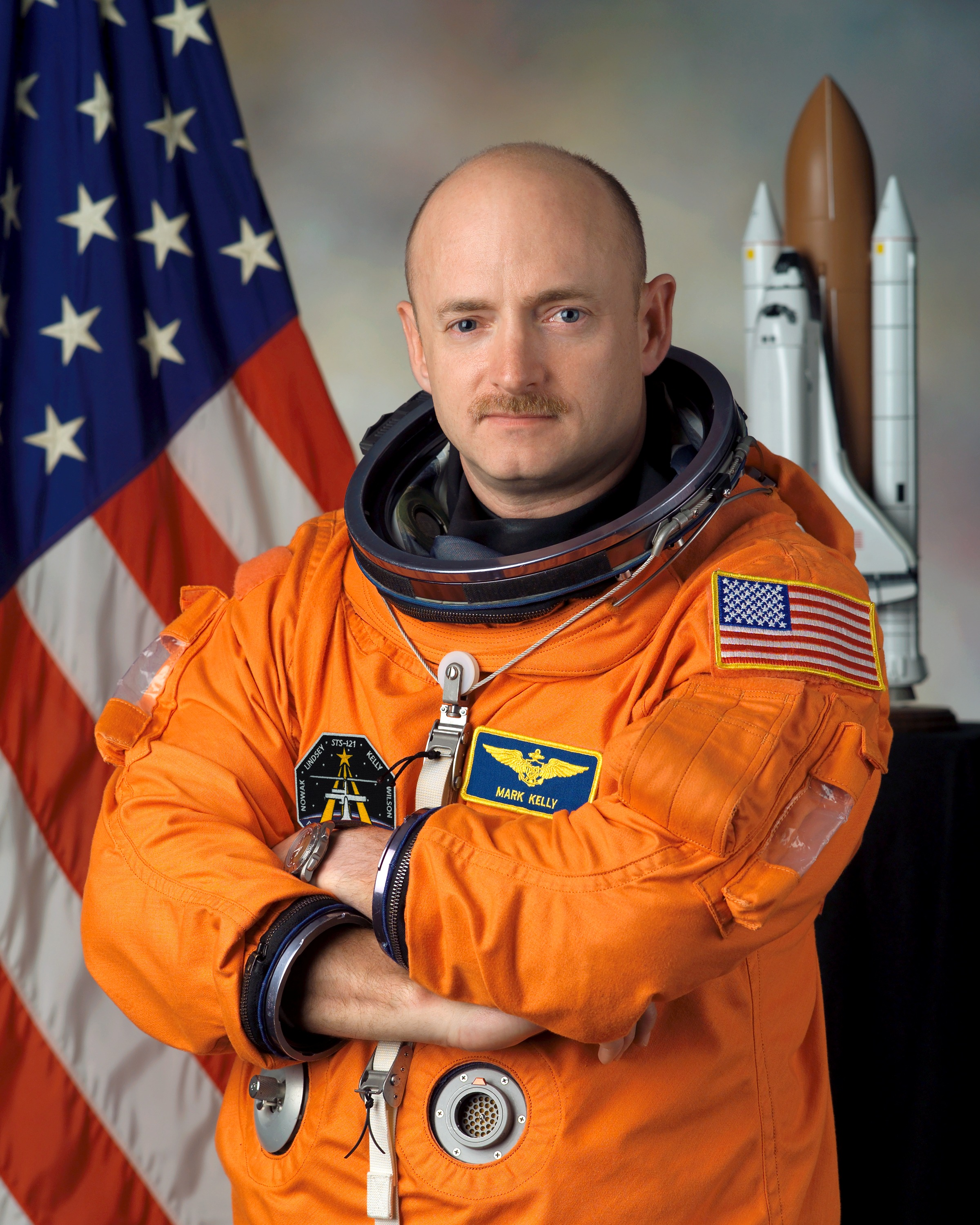
Kelly's official NASA portrait, 2005

NASA selected both Kelly and his identical twin, Scott Kelly, to be Space Shuttle pilots in 1996. They joined the NASA Astronaut Corps in August of that year. They are the only siblings to have both traveled into orbit.

=== Spaceflight experience ===
==== STS-108 ====
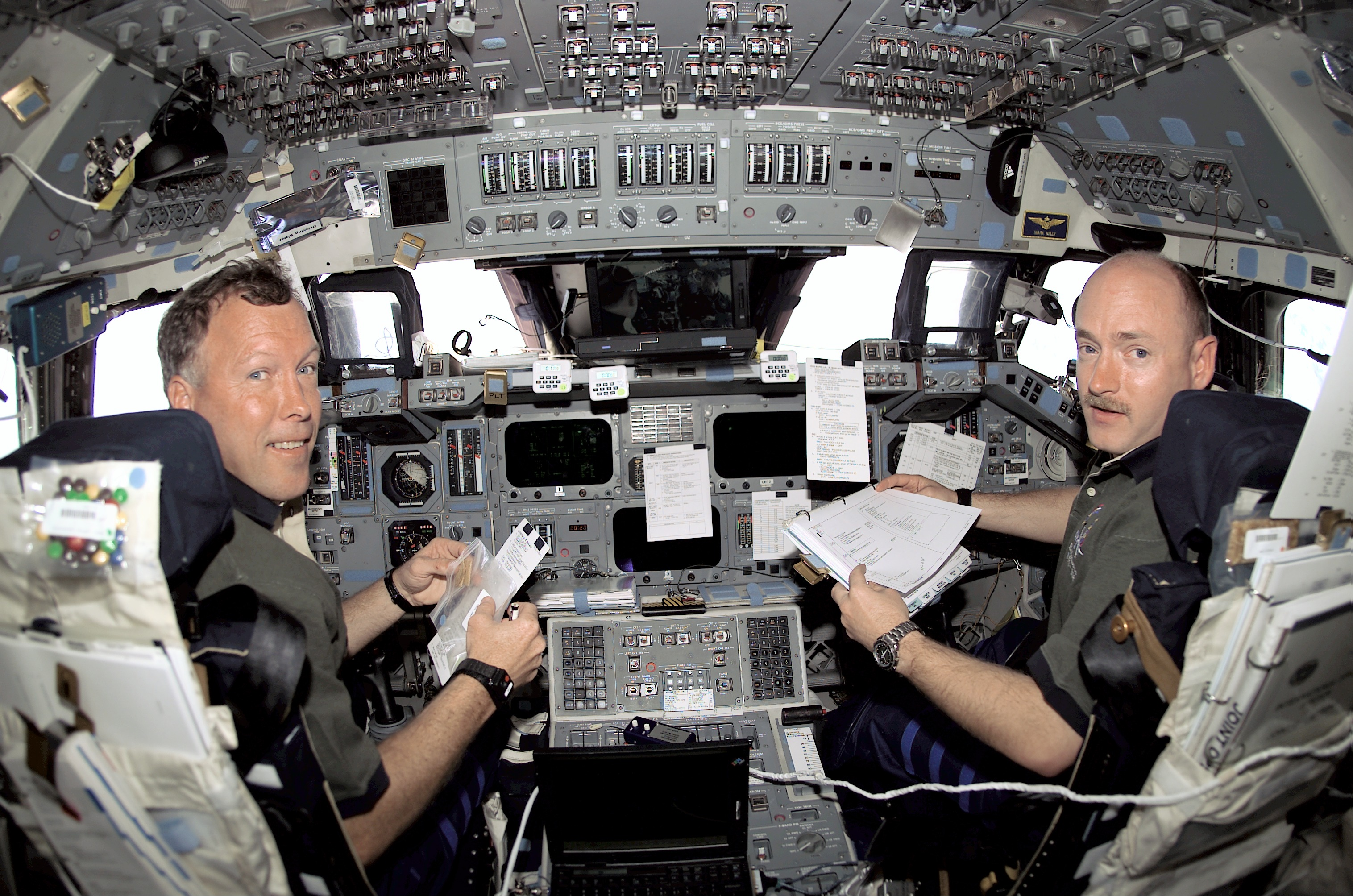
STS-108 Commander Dominic L. Pudwill Gorie and Pilot Mark Kelly, in their stations during rendezvous operations with the International Space Station, 2001

Kelly's first trip into space was as pilot of STS-108. After several delays, Endeavour lifted off on December 5, 2001, on the final Shuttle mission of 2001.

STS-108 Endeavour visited the ISS, delivering over three tons of equipment, supplies, and a fresh crew to the orbiting outpost. The hatches were opened between Endeavour and the ISS Destiny Laboratory on December 7, enabling the 10 crew members to greet one another. The Expedition 3 crew officially ended their 117-day residency on board the ISS on December 8 as their custom Soyuz seat-liners were transferred to Endeavour for the return trip home. The transfer of the Expedition 4 seat-liners to the Soyuz return vehicle attached to the station marked the official exchange of crews.

Kelly and Mission Specialist Linda Godwin used the shuttle's robotic arm to lift the Raffaello Multi-Purpose Logistics Module from the shuttle payload bay and attach it to a berth on the station's Unity node. The crews began unloading supplies the same day. Mission managers extended Endeavour's flight duration to 12 days to allow the crew to assist with additional maintenance tasks on the station, including work on a treadmill and replacing a failed compressor in one of the air conditioners in the Zvezda Service Module. A change of command ceremony took place on December 13 as Expedition 3 ended and Expedition 4 began. STS-108 returned to Earth with the previous ISS crew of three men.

Kelly traveled over 4.8 million miles and orbited the Earth 186 times over 11 days and 19+ hours.

==== STS-121 ====
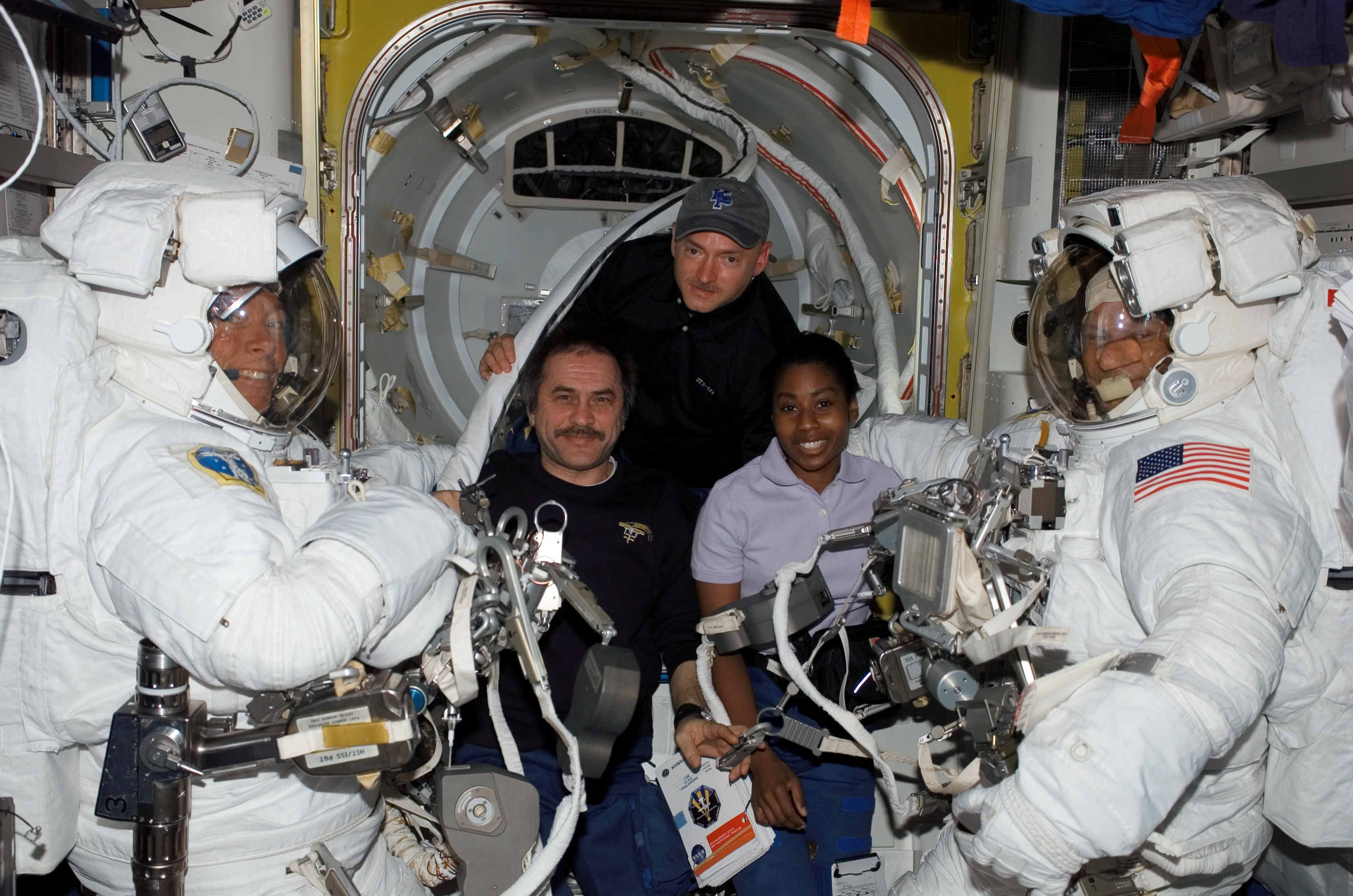
Kelly (center) surrounded by Piers J. Sellers (right), Michael E. Fossum (left), cosmonaut Pavel V. Vinogradov (center left) and Stephanie D. Wilson (center right), 2006

In July 2006, Kelly piloted STS-121 Discovery, the second "Return to Flight" mission after the loss of Columbia in February 2003. Because of weather delays, STS-121 became the first shuttle mission to launch on the Fourth of July. In 2006, Kelly discussed the risks aboard the Space Shuttle:

The Space Shuttle's a very complex machine. It's got a lot of moving parts that move and operate at pretty much the limit of what we've been able to engineer. Spaceflight is risky. I think with regards to the tank, we've reduced some of the risk there. We've changed the design a little bit and we've made some pretty big strides in trying to get foam not to shed from the tank anymore. So there is some risk reduction there and I guess overall the risk is probably a little less. But this is a risky business, but it's got a big reward. Everybody on board Discovery and the space station here thinks it's worthwhile.

The mission's main purposes were to test new safety and repair techniques introduced after the Columbia disaster and to deliver supplies, equipment, and European Space Agency astronaut Thomas Reiter from Germany to the ISS. Reiter's transfer returned the ISS to a three-member staffing level.

During the STS-121 mission to the ISS, the crew of Discovery continued to test new equipment and procedures for the inspection and repair of the thermal protection system that is designed to increase the shuttles' safety. It also delivered more supplies and cargo for future ISS expansion.

After the Columbia accident, NASA decided that two test flights would be required and that activities originally assigned to STS-114 would be divided into two missions because of the addition of post-Columbia safety tests.

Gabby Giffords, Kelly's girlfriend at the time, picked one of the mission's wake-up songs, U2's "Beautiful Day". During the U2 360° Tour, Kelly often appeared on screen from the International Space Station during the song's introduction, greeting the city the band was playing in and asking the crowd to "tell my wife I love her very much, she knows"—a reference to David Bowie's "Space Oddity"; the tour's staging was often called the "space station".

Kelly traveled over 5.28 million miles and orbited the Earth 202 times over 12 days and 18+ hours.

==== STS-124 ====
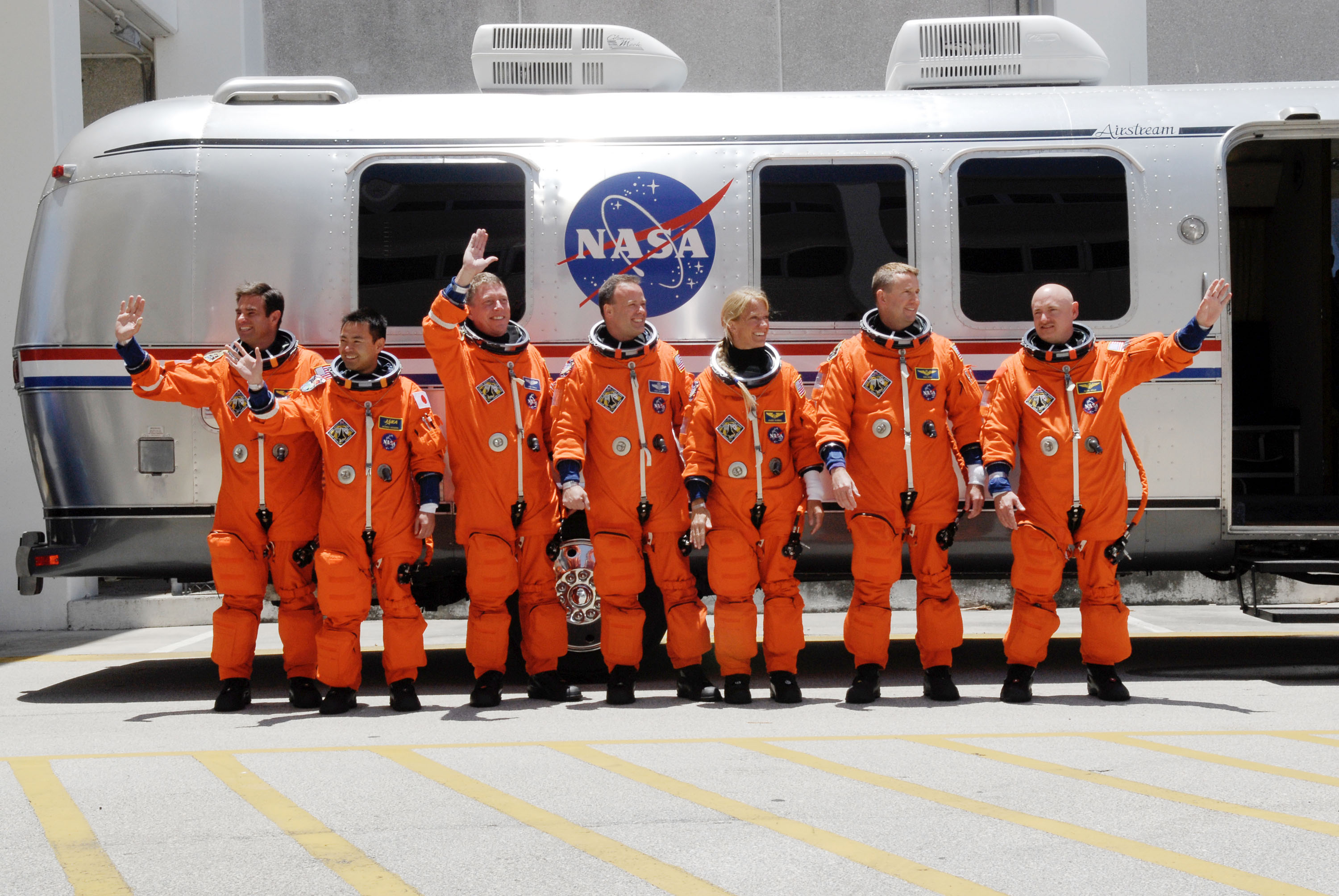
Commander Kelly with his crew at the Kennedy Space Center just before boarding Discovery on May 31, 2008

STS-124 Discovery was Kelly's first mission as commander. A month before liftoff, he discussed what being a shuttle commander entailed and how it was different from his previous missions:

My first two flights I was the pilot. Being the commander is different in that you're responsible for the overall mission. ... You have to worry about the whole thing, the training drill your other crew members are getting, mission success, and mission safety. So it is a more comprehensive job and requires more time. I'm really a little bit surprised at how much more there is to it. But I think it's more rewarding as well.

The mission was the second of three shuttle missions to carry components of Japan's Kibo laboratory to the ISS. Kibo is Japanese for "hope". The laboratory is Japan's primary contribution to the ISS.

Just before liftoff, Kelly said, "While we've all prepared for this event today, the discoveries from Kibo will definitely offer hope for tomorrow. Now stand by for the greatest show on Earth."

During the launch, Launch Pad 39A sustained substantial damage, more than had been seen on any previous launch. After liftoff, inspectors discovered that bricks and mortar from the launch pad's base had been thrown as far as the perimeter fence, a distance of 1,500 feet (457 m).

Kelly and his crew delivered the pressurized module for Kibo to the ISS. The module is the Kibo laboratory's largest component and the station's largest habitable module. Discovery also delivered Kibo's Remote Manipulator System. It also delivered a replacement part for the station's toilet. The ISS's toilet had been malfunctioning for a week, creating a potentially serious problem for the crew. When Kelly first entered the station, he joked, "You looking for a plumber?"

This mission was the first time a spouse of a member of Congress traveled to space. Kelly traveled over 5.7 million miles, and orbited the Earth 218 times over 13 days and 18 hours. As of 2009, Kelly had logged over 54 days in space overall.

==== STS-134 ====
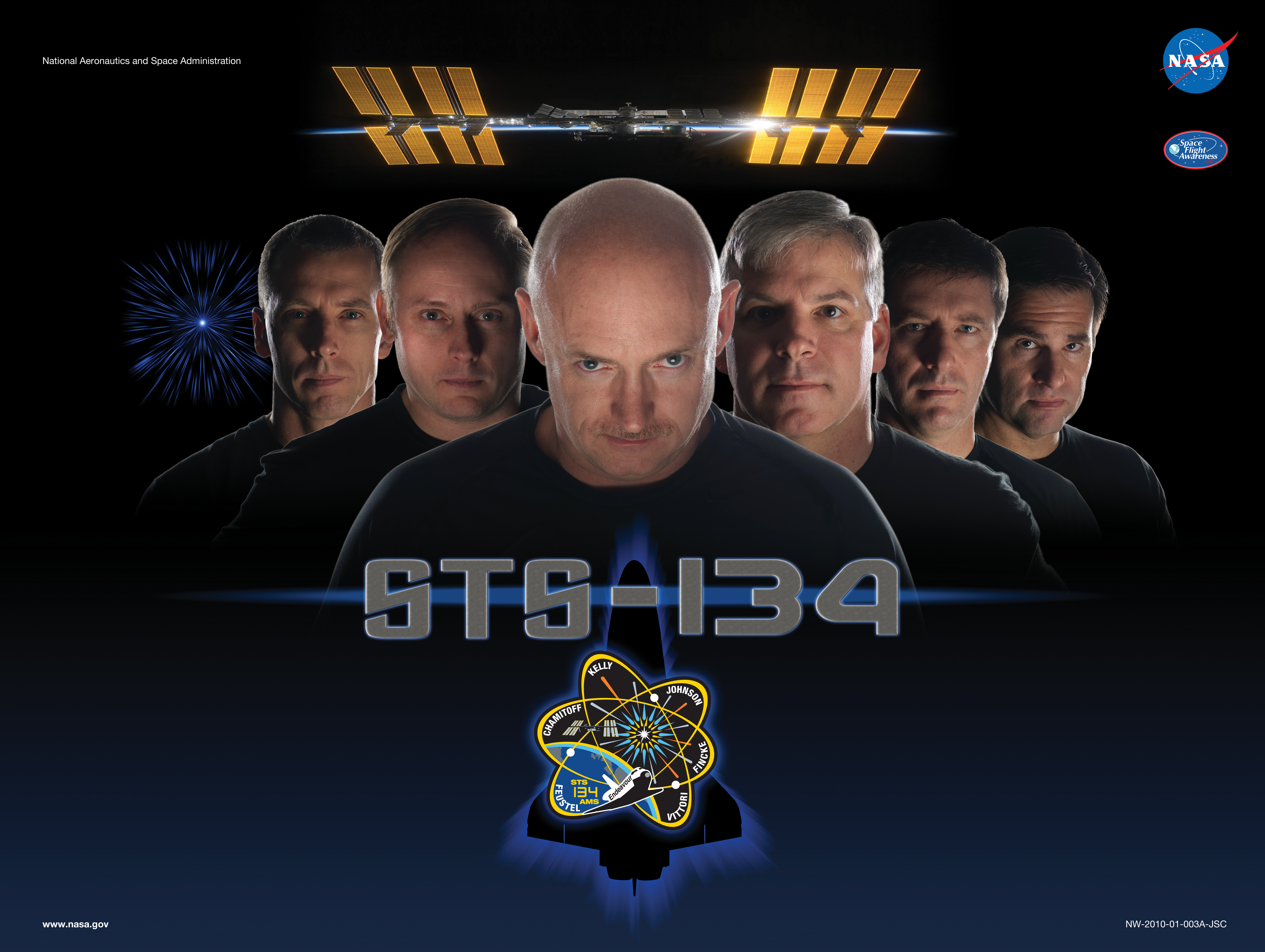
Mission poster, based on a Star Trek promotional poster

STS-134 launched on May 16, 2011.

On April 29, 2011, the first launch attempt of STS-134 was scrubbed. Giffords traveled to Florida on her first trip since moving from Tucson to Houston in January after an attempted assassination. Her appearance at Kennedy Space Center gave the launch a high profile, "one of the most anticipated in years", according to The New York Times. President Barack Obama visited the Kennedy Space Center on April 29 on a trip with the original intention of watching the Endeavour launch.

Kelly was the commander of the mission, which was Endeavour's last. He and his crew delivered the Alpha Magnetic Spectrometer to the ISS.

Most of the mission's delays were caused by external tank issues on STS-133 Discovery. When Scott Kelly went to the ISS on October 7, 2010, STS-134 was scheduled to go to the station during his mission. The potential rendezvous in space of the Kelly brothers would have been a first meeting of blood relatives in space. The delay of STS-134's launch ended that possibility.

After his wife's shooting, Kelly's status was unclear, but NASA announced on February 4, 2011, that he would remain commander of the mission. The remarkable progress his wife was making in her recovery helped Kelly decide to return to training. Peggy Whitson, chief of the NASA Astronaut Office at the time, said, "we are confident in his ability to successfully lead this mission, and I know I speak for all of NASA in saying 'welcome back'."

==== Papal blessing ====
At 4 p.m. PDT on May 22, 2011, the European Space Agency and Italian Space Agency arranged for a call to Endeavour by Pope Benedict XVI. During his call, Benedict extended his blessing to Giffords, who had undergone skull surgery earlier in the week. The event marked the first time a pope spoke to astronauts during a mission.

==== U2 ====
On June 24, 2011, a recorded message by Kelly from the ISS wished his wife love using song lyrics from David Bowie's "Space Oddity" and introduced U2's song "Beautiful Day" on the first night of the Glastonbury festival in England. A similar message from Kelly aboard the ISS was played during U2's 360° Tour concert stop at various locations. It said: "I'm looking forward to coming home. Tell my wife I love her very much. She knows."

=== Retirement ===
On June 21, 2011, Kelly announced that he would leave NASA's astronaut corps and the U.S. Navy effective October 1. He cited Giffords's needs during her recovery as a reason for his retirement. He announced his retirement on his Facebook page, writing: "Words cannot convey my deep gratitude for the opportunities I have been given to serve our great nation. From the day I entered the United States Merchant Marine Academy in the summer of 1982 to the moment I landed the Space Shuttle Endeavour three weeks ago, it has been my privilege to advance the ideals that define the United States of America."

== Post-NASA career (2011–2016) ==
=== Author ===
In 2011, Kelly and Giffords coauthored Gabby: A Story of Courage, Love and Resilience. The book provides biographical information on the couple and describes in detail the assassination attempt on Giffords and her initial recovery. Written in Kelly's voice, it includes a short note by Giffords at the end.

Kelly's second book, Mousetronaut: Based on a (Partially) True Story (2012), is a children's book illustrated by C. F. Payne. It was a New York Times number one bestseller and was followed the next year by a sequel, Mousetronaut Goes to Mars.

In 2014, Giffords and Kelly coauthored Enough: Our Fight to Keep America Safe from Gun Violence.

In 2015, Kelly and Martha Freeman co-wrote Astrotwins: Project Blastoff, a fictional story about twins Scott and Mark who build a space capsule in their grandfather's backyard and try to send the first kid into orbit. Kelly dedicated this book to Scott Kelly. The sequel, Astrotwins—Project Rescue, was published in 2016.

=== Aerospace work ===
Kelly was a co-founder and strategic advisor of Tucson-based high-altitude balloon near-space exploration company World View Enterprises. He served as Director of Flight Crew Operations beginning in 2013, and was involved in the development of the new craft, as well as its procedures and operations. Chinese company Tencent invested millions into World View between 2013 and 2016. Kelly left World View in 2019, before he started his Senate campaign; as of 2021 he held over $100,000 of World View stocks through a blind trust.

On March 28, 2012, SpaceX announced that Kelly would be part of an independent safety advisory panel composed of leading human spaceflight safety experts.

=== Speeches ===
From 2011 to 2016, Kelly delivered paid speeches in the U.S. and in China on behalf of Shaklee, a multi-level marketing distributor of nutritional supplements.

Separately, Kelly has also delivered paid speeches to bank Goldman Sachs, the Mortgage Bankers Association, and drug company AmerisourceBergen.

=== Political activism ===
In January 2013, weeks after the Sandy Hook Elementary School shooting, Kelly and Giffords started a nonprofit political action committee, Americans for Responsible Solutions (ARS). The organization's mission is to promote solutions to gun violence with elected officials and the general public. The couple say it supports the Second Amendment while promoting responsible gun ownership and "keeping guns out of the hands of dangerous people like criminals, terrorists, and the mentally ill". The group claims that "current gun laws allow private sellers to sell guns without a background check, creating a loophole that provides criminals and the mentally ill easy access to guns". On March 31, 2013, Kelly said, "any bill that does not include a universal background check is a mistake. It's the most common-sense thing we can do to prevent criminals and the mentally ill from having access to weapons." In 2016, ARS merged with the Law Center to Prevent Gun Violence to become Giffords, which besides background checks advocates for red flag laws.

== U.S. Senate (2020–present) ==
=== Elections ===
==== 2020 special ====
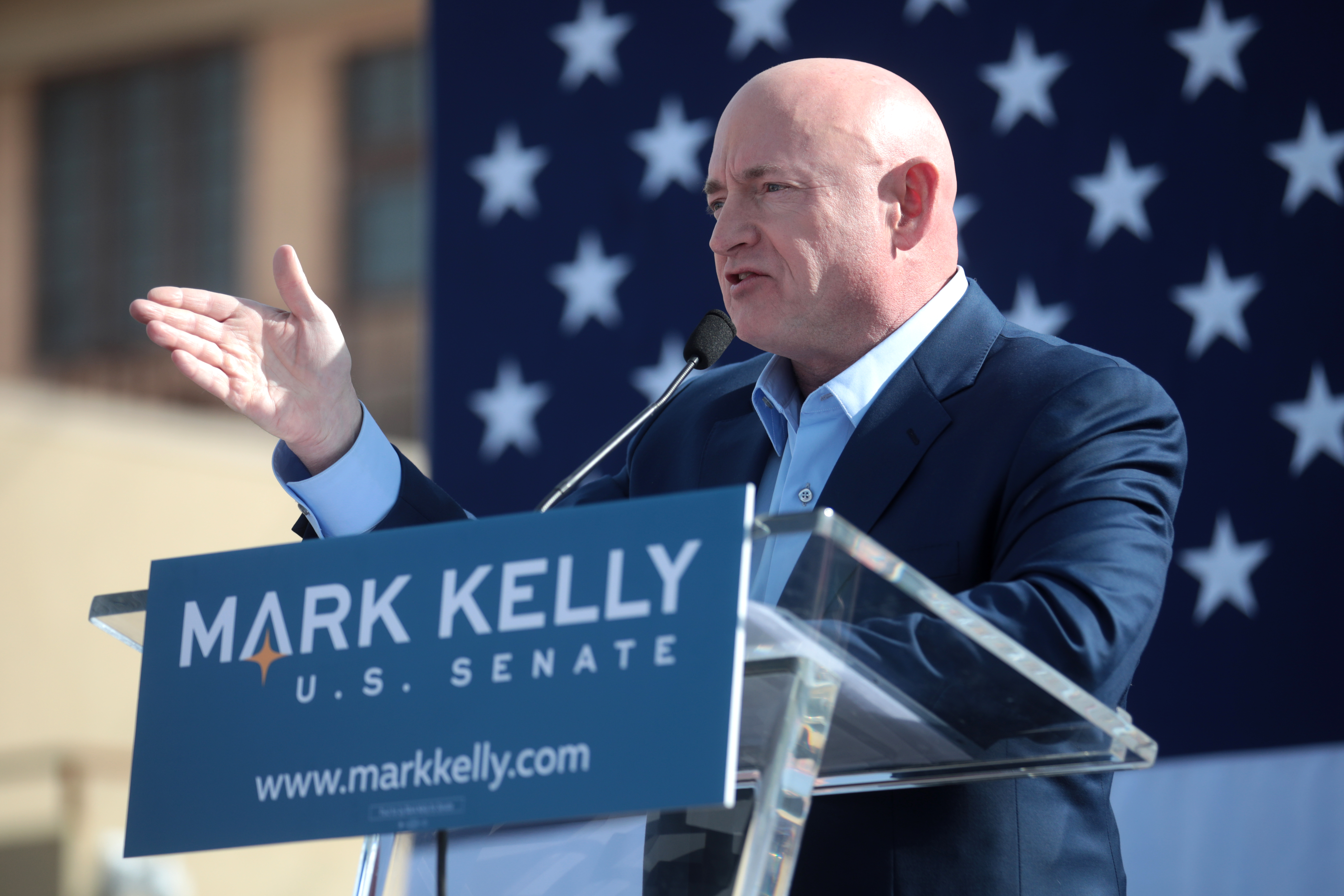
Kelly at the launch of his U.S. Senate campaign in downtown Phoenix in February 2019

On February 12, 2019, Kelly announced that he would run as a Democrat in the 2020 U.S. Senate special election in Arizona. Kelly looked to unseat incumbent Republican Martha McSally, a fellow veteran who was appointed to the seat shortly after losing the 2018 election for the state's other seat in the Senate to Democrat Kyrsten Sinema. The seat was vacated upon John McCain's death on August 25, 2018, and held by Governor Doug Ducey's appointee Jon Kyl until Kyl resigned on December 31, 2018. Kelly declined to accept campaign contributions from corporate political action committees (PACs), but did accept hundreds of thousands of dollars in campaign contributions from corporate executives and lobbyists.

The Associated Press called the race for Kelly on November 4, 2020. His election marks the first time since 1953 that Arizona has had two Democratic senators. As the election was a special election, Kelly took office during the 116th Congress, shortly after Arizona certified its election results on November 30, unlike other senators and representatives elected in 2020, who took office at the opening of the 117th Congress on January 3, 2021. Kelly became the last of four Senators to serve during the nineteenth Senate term for the Arizona's Class 3 seat, from January 3, 2017 to January 3, 2023. He was sworn in at noon on December 2.

Kelly is the fifth retired astronaut to be elected to Congress, after John Glenn, Harrison Schmitt, Bill Nelson, and Jack Swigert. (Note: Swigert was elected to Congress, but never served, dying a week before he would have taken office.)

==== 2022 ====
Kelly was reelected in 2022, defeating Republican nominee Blake Masters by 125,719 votes.

=== Tenure ===
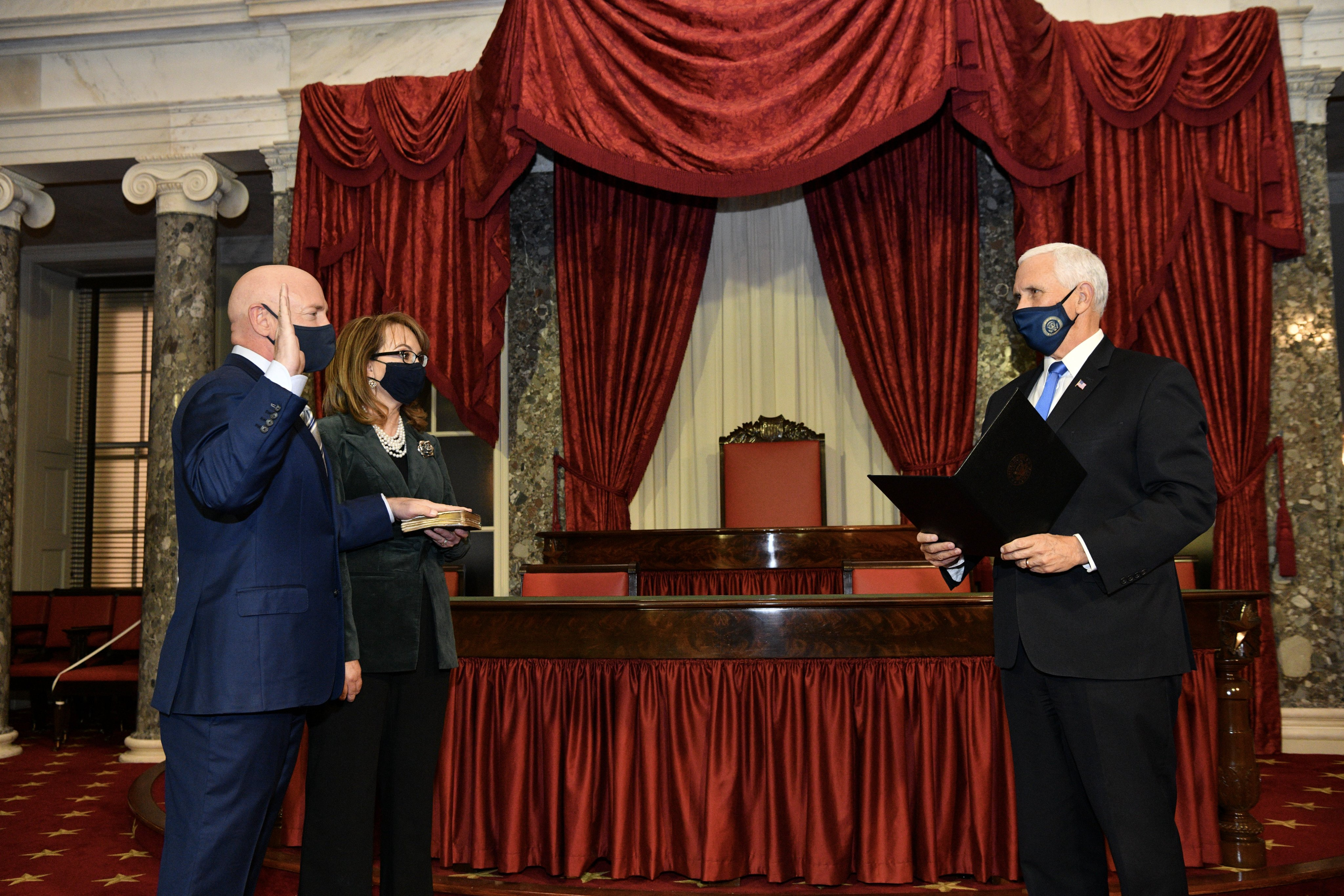
Kelly being sworn in as senator from Arizona by Vice President Mike Pence, with his wife, Gabby Giffords

On December 2, 2020, Kelly cast his first Senate vote, a "no" vote on the nomination of Kathryn C. Davis to the U.S. Court of Federal Claims. On December 9, Kelly voted "no" on a resolution blocking President Donald Trump from selling $23 billion in drones to the United Arab Emirates. Kelly split his vote by voting yes on another resolution blocking F-35 sales to the UAE. Both resolutions failed.

In the wake of the January 6 U.S. Capitol attack, Kelly said that Vice President Mike Pence and Trump's cabinet "have the responsibility to discuss invoking the 25th amendment", Section 4 of which allows the vice president and cabinet to declare the president unable to serve and transfer presidential power to the vice president. Kelly voted to convict in Trump's second impeachment trial, along with 56 other senators.

In January 2023, three bills regarding Indian tribes, introduced by Kelly and fellow Arizona Senator Kyrsten Sinema, were signed into law by President Joe Biden. One bill regarding the White Mountain Apache Tribe Water Rights Quantification Act allocated more federal money and time to build water infrastructure for the White Mountain Apache Tribe. A second bill, the Colorado River Indian Tribes Water Resiliency Act, permitted the Colorado River Indian Tribes (the Mohave, Chemehuevi, Hopi, and Navajo) to begin leasing out parts of the Colorado River they were allocated, while a third bill, the Hualapai Tribe Water Rights Settlement Act, allocated part of the Colorado River to the Hualapai tribe, so that water infrastructure can deliver water to the tribe.

During the 117th Congress, Kelly co-sponsored several legislative bills that were supported by both parties and became law; these bills included those on the topics of mandating de-escalation training for law enforcement, updating ocean shipping governance, combating human trafficking, and reimbursing people suffering from radiation from atomic weapon tests; during the 118th Congress, Kelly co-sponsored the bipartisan END FENTANYL Act, passed in 2023. The law requires United States Customs and Border Protection to refresh its interdiction procedures at least every three years to mitigate advances in narcotics and human trafficking across the U.S. southern border.

In November 2025, Kelly was one of six Democratic lawmakers to participate in a video reminding military service members that they may refuse "illegal orders". Later that month, President Trump called those in the video, including Kelly, traitors who should be charged with sedition and shared a social media post calling for them to be hanged.

On November 24, 2025, the United States Department of Defense announced that Kelly was under investigation after it received "serious allegations of misconduct" in relation to the "illegal orders" video. Kelly and the other lawmakers in the video subsequently received threats. He told CNN, "We get more threats now in a single day than we would get in months, and they're graphic, they're violent." Kelly raised $12.5 million in the final quarter of 2025. On January 5, 2026, Secretary of Defense Pete Hegseth announced that the Pentagon would pursue administrative measures against Kelly, including the reduction of his retirement pay, in response to his participation in the video. Kelly sued one week later, alleging that the actions violated the principles of protected free speech and legislative independence.

In February 2026, a grand jury declined to return an indictment against Kelly and the others for the video. Subsequently, Judge Richard J. Leon of the United States District Court for the District of Columbia issued a temporary injunction against Hegseth's proposed actions on Kelly's rank and pension. Hegseth said Leon's decision would be "immediately appealed".

=== Committee assignments ===
- Committee on Armed Services
  - Subcommittee on Airland (ranking member)
  - Subcommittee on Emerging Threats and Capabilities
- Select Committee on Intelligence
- Committee on Energy and Natural Resources (until October 17, 2023)
  - Subcommittee on National Parks
  - Subcommittee on Public Lands, Forests, and Mining
  - Subcommittee on Water and Power
- Committee on Environment and Public Works
  - Subcommittee on Chemical Safety, Waste Management, Environmental Justice, and Regulatory Oversight
  - Subcommittee on Fisheries, Water, and Wildlife
  - Subcommittee on Transportation and Infrastructure
- Special Committee on Aging
- Joint Economic Committee

== Political positions ==
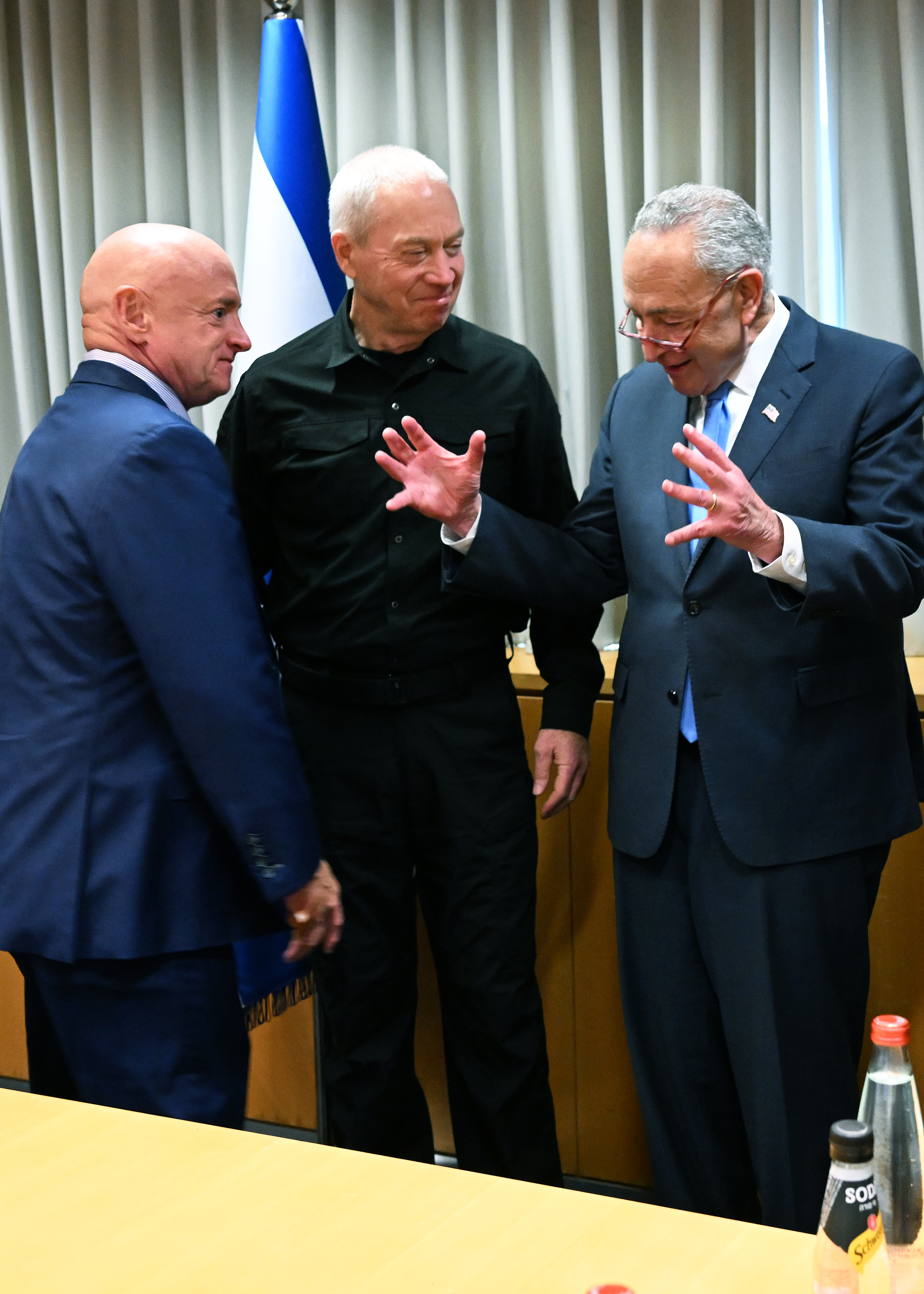
Kelly with Israeli Defense Minister Yoav Gallant and U.S. Senator Chuck Schumer on October 15, 2023

Kelly ran as a moderate in 2020 and voiced support for bipartisanship. Since joining the Senate, he supported abolishing the filibuster in order to pass voting rights legislation and a federal minimum wage increase to $15 per hour. He criticized Joe Biden's approach to border security. As of October 2022, Kelly had voted in line with Biden's stated position 94.5% of the time.

=== Abortion ===
As a candidate in 2020, Kelly said he was "pro-choice" and was endorsed by Planned Parenthood. He supports codifying Roe v. Wade into federal law. He has said that late-stage abortions should be legally protected.

=== Climate and environment ===
Kelly has voiced support for climate action, but said he "does not favor" the Green New Deal. The League of Conservation Voters gave him a 97% score in 2021. In a 2021 Greenpeace exposé, Kelly was one of 11 U.S. senators ExxonMobil Senior Director for Federal Relations Keith McCoy called "crucial" to the company. Kelly has received funding from ExxonMobil lobbyists. In 2022, he advocated for an expansion of oil drilling in the wake of rising gas prices.

In 2025, Kelly was one of three Senate Democrats (alongside John Fetterman and Ruben Gallego) to vote to confirm Lee Zeldin as Environmental Protection Agency Administrator for Donald Trump's second term.

=== Israel ===
Kelly has voiced strong support for Israel, saying on the Senate floor: "I cannot and will never abandon Israel. Israel is one of our closest partners. They have a right to defend themselves, and I will always support Israel's right to exist as a successful and prosperous nation." But since the 2026 Iran War and Gaza war, Kelly has voted against some weapons transfers to Israel, saying: "we can all look at what is happening in the region right now and understand that this is not business as usual—and it is not making us safer. The United States and Israel are fighting a war against Iran without a clear strategy or goal. I've been clear I oppose this war in Iran and the reckless decisions being made by Prime Minister Netanyahu and President Trump." Kelly also said: "We are in a moment where we have to ask ourselves: does this bring us closer to peace and security? So, today I've decided to vote yes on these resolutions to stop these transfers."

=== Guns ===
Kelly became an outspoken advocate for gun control after the attempted assassination of his wife, former U.S. Representative Gabby Giffords, in the 2011 Tucson mass shooting.

Kelly voted for the Bipartisan Safer Communities Act in response to the Robb Elementary School shooting in Uvalde, Texas.

=== Healthcare ===
Kelly supports building on the Affordable Care Act (also known as Obamacare) to include a public health insurance option. He opposes Medicare for All.

=== Immigration ===
Kelly has expressed support for the Deferred Action for Childhood Arrivals program, saying, "Dreamers are as American as anyone." In July 2024, he blamed former President Donald Trump for sinking a bipartisan border bill.

In 2025, Kelly was one of 12 Senate Democrats who joined all Republicans to vote for the Laken Riley Act, which requires Immigration and Customs Enforcement to detain non-citizens arrested for certain crimes during their immigration proceedings.

=== Donald Trump ===
In February 2021, Kelly voted to convict Donald Trump for incitement of insurrection in his second impeachment trial, and has been outspoken in his disdain for him.

=== Presidential ambitions ===
Kelly spoke in August 2026 about the possibility of running for president in 2028.

== Personal life ==
Kelly married Amelia Victoria Babis on January 7, 1989. They divorced in 2004. They have two daughters, Claudia and Claire Kelly.

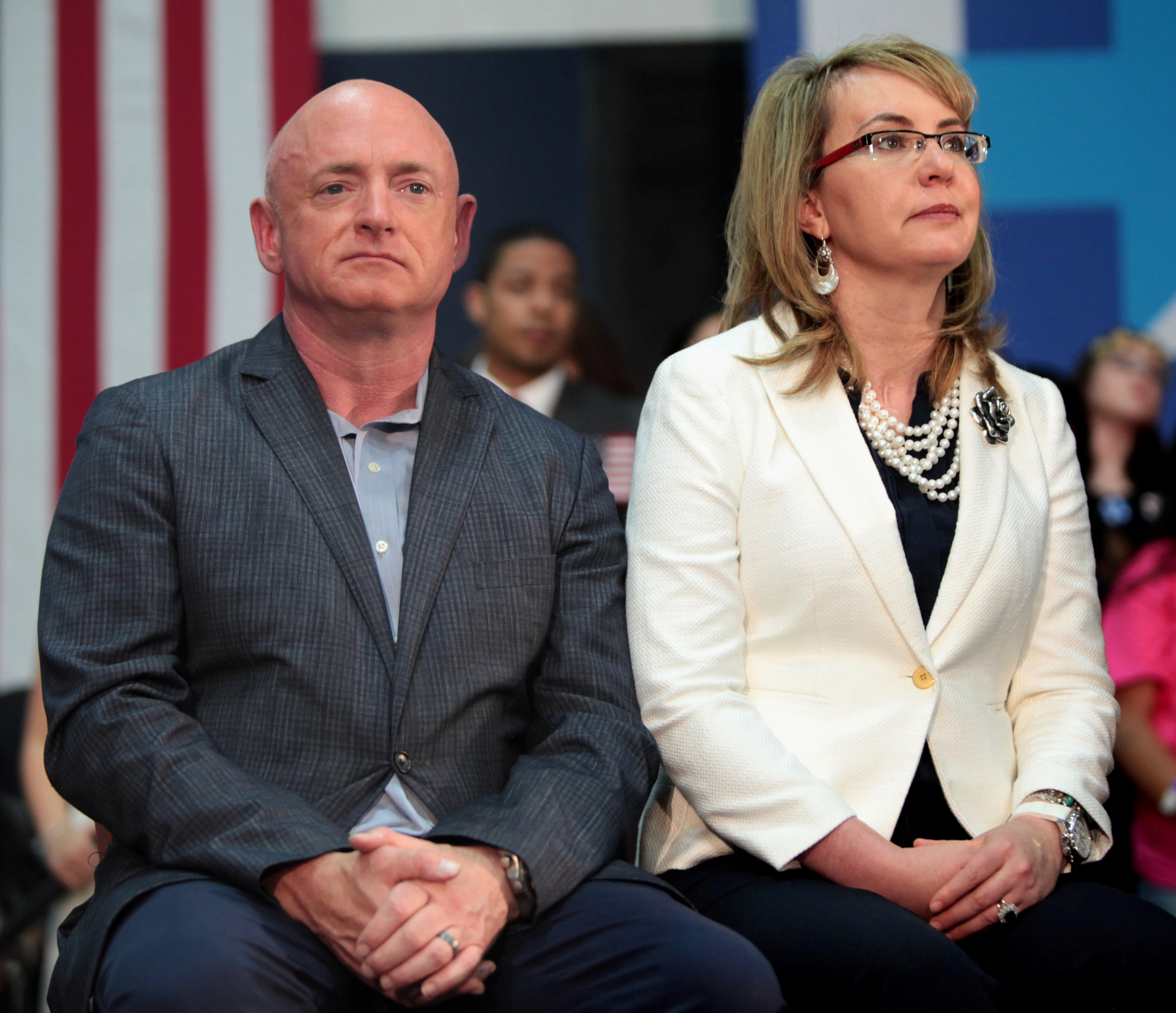
Kelly and his wife, Gabby Giffords, in 2016

Kelly married U.S. representative Gabby Giffords of Tucson on November 10, 2007, in a ceremony presided over by Rabbi Stephanie Aaron at Congregation Temple Chaverim in Tucson, Arizona, attended by his STS-124 shuttle crew and former secretary of labor Robert Reich. Reich toasted: "To a bride who moves at a velocity that exceeds that of anyone else in Washington and a groom who moves at a velocity that exceeds 17,000 miles per hour." The couple met on a 2003 trip to China as part of a trade mission sponsored by the National Committee on U.S.–China Relations. Giffords is Jewish. Kelly maintains a close relationship with the family of the Israeli astronaut Ilan Ramon, with whom he served in Dallas.

At the time of their marriage, Kelly lived in Houston, Texas, and said the longest stretch of time the two had spent together was a couple of weeks. He said that they did not plan to always live that way, but that it was what they were used to. He added, "It teaches you not to sweat the small stuff."

Kelly appeared on an episode of Celebrity Jeopardy! in 2015.

=== Shooting in Tucson ===
Giffords was shot in an assassination attempt on January 8, 2011, which killed six people and brought national attention to Kelly. On February 4, Kelly described the previous month as the hardest time of his life and expressed his gratitude for the enormous outpouring of support, good wishes and prayers for his wife. He said that he believed people's prayers for her helped.

One of Giffords's aides informed Kelly of the shooting almost immediately after it happened. He flew from Houston to Tucson with members of his family. En route, the Kellys received an erroneous news report that Giffords had died. "The kids, Claudia and Claire, started crying. My mother, she almost screamed. I just walked into the bathroom, and, you know, broke down." Calling family in Tucson, Kelly found out that the report had been false and that she was alive and in surgery. "It was a terrible mistake," Kelly said. "As bad as it was that she had died, it's equally exciting that she hadn't."

From the time he arrived in Tucson, Kelly sat vigil at his wife's bedside as she struggled to survive and began to recover. As her condition began to improve, the Kelly-Giffords family researched options for rehabilitation facilities and chose one in Houston. On January 21, Giffords was transferred to the Memorial Hermann–Texas Medical Center, where she spent five days before moving to TIRR Memorial Hermann, where she continued her recovery and rehabilitation.

Giffords and Kelly had spoken dozens of times about how risky her job was. She was afraid that someone with a gun would come up to her at a public event. In an interview filmed just over a week after the shooting, Kelly said, "She has Tombstone, Arizona, in her district, the town that's too tough to die. Gabrielle Giffords is too tough to let this beat her."

==== Aftermath ====
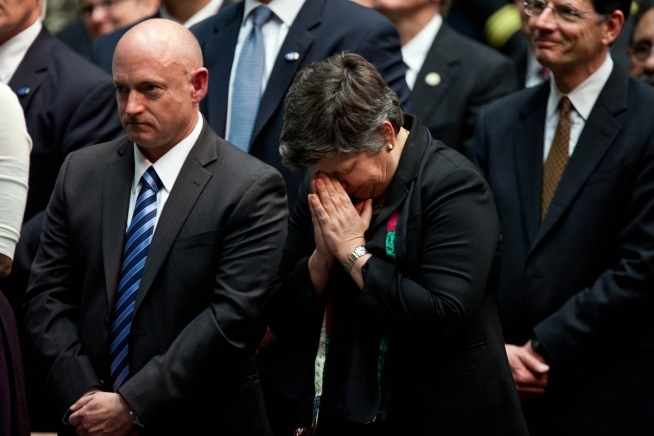
Kelly and homeland security secretary and former Arizona governor Janet Napolitano at the Tucson memorial service

A memorial service for those killed in the assassination attempt was held on January 12, 2011, at the University of Arizona. President Obama flew to Tucson to speak at the memorial. Kelly sat between First Lady Michelle Obama and Secretary of Homeland Security Janet Napolitano, the former governor of Arizona. At the end of the service, Obama consoled and embraced him, after which Kelly returned to the hospital to be with his wife.

Kelly spoke on February 3, 2011, at the National Prayer Breakfast in Washington, D.C. His remarks closed the event, where Obama also spoke. Kelly said the attack on his wife brought him closer to God and gave him a newfound awareness regarding prayer. He said that before the attack, "I thought the world just spins and the clock just ticks and things happen for no particular reason", but that, in Tucson, as he found himself wandering in makeshift memorials and shrines filled with Bibles and angels, "You pray where you are. You pray when God is there in your heart." Kelly offered the final prayer of the morning, lightly adapted by Rabbi Stephanie Aaron from a traditional bedtime prayer. Rabbi Aaron, who had married Kelly and Giffords, had said the same words over Giffords on the night of the shooting:

In the name of God, our God of Israel, may Michael, God's angel messenger of compassion, watch over your right side. May Gabriel, God's angel messenger of strength and courage, be on your left. And before you, guiding your path, Uriel, God's angel of light and behind you, supporting you, stands Raphael, God's angel of healing. And over your head, surrounding you, is the presence of the Divine.

In 2011, Kelly said he believed there was a chance to change a political environment he believed was too vitriolic. He hoped that the tragedy would be an opportunity to improve the tone of the national dialogue and cool down the rhetoric. In response to a question on February 4, 2011, about civility in politics, Kelly said, "I haven't spent a lot of time following that, but I think that with something that was so horrible and so negative, and the fact that six people lost their lives including a nine-year-old girl, a federal judge, Gabby's staff member Gabe—who was like a younger brother to her—it's really, really a sad situation. I am hopeful that something positive can come out of it. I think that will happen, so those are good things."

== Electoral history ==
Democratic primary for the 2020 United States Senate special election in Arizona
Party	Candidate	Votes	%
Democratic	Mark Kelly	665,620	99.9%
Democratic	Bo Garcia (write-in)	451	0.1%
Total votes		666,071	100.0%

2020 United States Senate special election in Arizona
Party	Candidate	Votes	%	±%
Democratic	Mark Kelly	1,716,467	51.16%	+10.41%
Republican	Martha McSally (incumbent)	1,637,661	48.81%	−4.90%
Write-in		1,189	0.03%	-0.03%
Total votes		3,355,317	100.0%	

Democratic primary for the 2022 United States Senate election in Arizona
Party	Candidate	Votes	%
Democratic	Mark Kelly (incumbent)	589,400	100.0%
Total votes		589,400	100.0%

2022 United States Senate election in Arizona
Party	Candidate	Votes	%	±%
Democratic	Mark Kelly (incumbent)	1,322,027	51.39%	+0.23%
Republican	Blake Masters	1,196,308	46.51%	−2.30%
Libertarian	Marc Victor (withdrawn)	53,762	2.09%	N/A
Write-in		197	0.01%	–0.02%
Total votes		2,572,294	100.0%	

== Awards and decorations ==
Kelly's awards and decorations include:

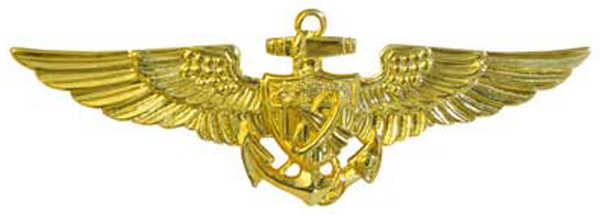

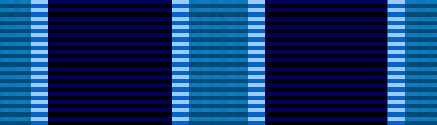

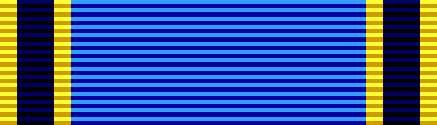

Naval Pilot Astronaut Badge
Defense Superior Service Medal; One oak leaf cluster		Legion of Merit	Distinguished Flying Cross; One award star
Air Medal; Valor device and three service stars	Navy Commendation Medal; Valor device and one service star	Navy Achievement Medal	Navy Unit Commendation; One service star
NASA Outstanding Leadership Medal	NASA Exceptional Service Medal	NASA Space Flight Medal; Three service stars	Navy Expeditionary Medal
National Defense Service Medal; One service star	Armed Forces Expeditionary Medal	Southwest Asia Service Medal; One service star	Sea Service Deployment Ribbon; One service star
Overseas Service Ribbon	Navy Marksmanship Medal–Pistol	Kuwait Liberation Medal (Saudi Arabia)	Kuwait Liberation Medal (Kuwait)

== Notes ==
Party political offices
Preceded by Ann Kirkpatrick	Democratic nominee for U.S. Senator from Arizona (Class 3); 2020, 2022	Most recent
U.S. Senate
Preceded by Martha McSally	U.S. Senator (Class 3) from Arizona; 2020–present Served alongside: Kyrsten Sinema, Ruben Gallego	Incumbent
U.S. order of precedence (ceremonial)
Preceded by Rick Scott	Order of precedence of the United States as United States Senator	Succeeded by Bill Hagerty
Preceded by Rick Scott	United States senators by seniority 69th	Succeeded by Ben Ray Luján
