= Julie Johnson (politician) =

American politician (born 1966)

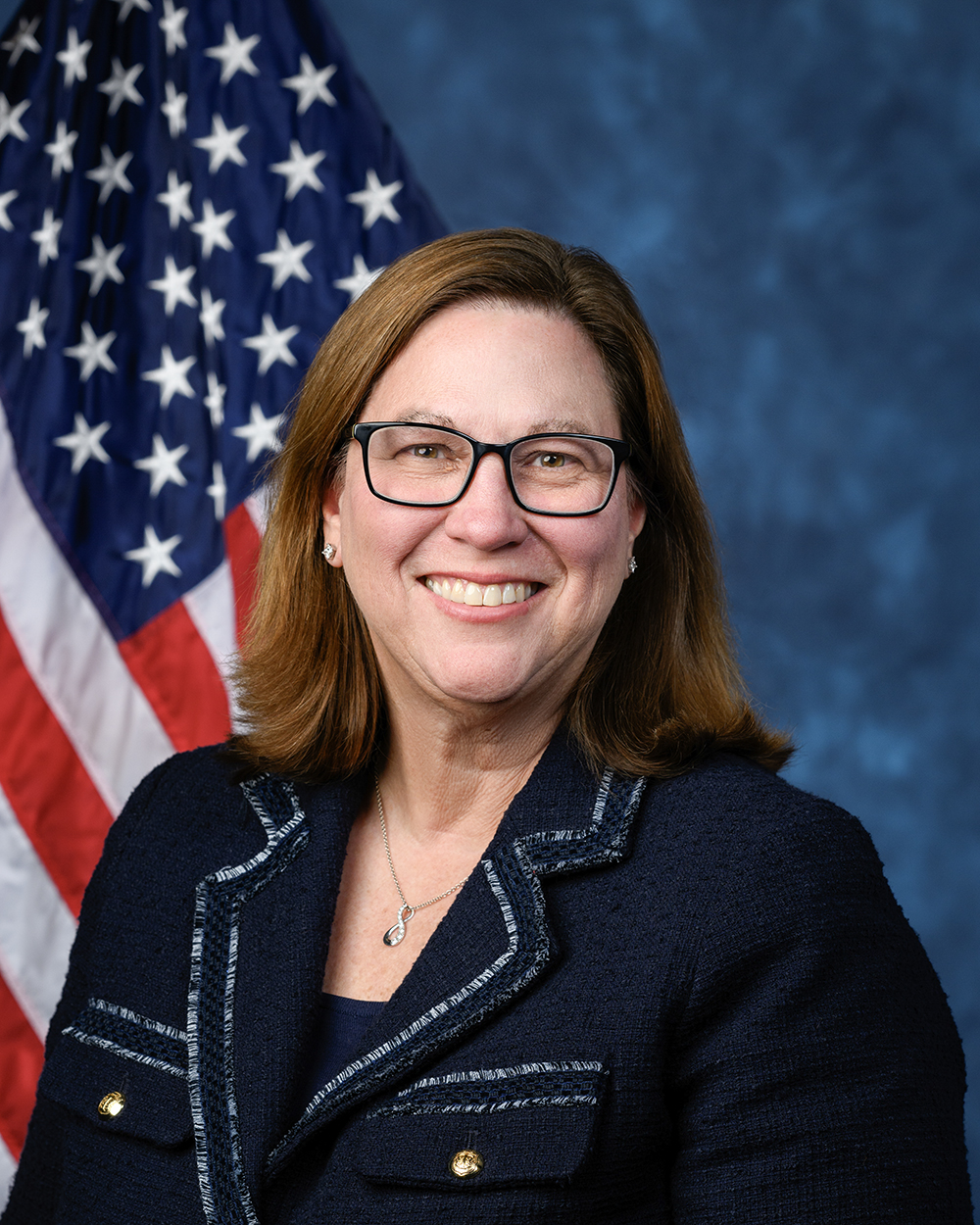
- Official portrait, 2024

Member of the U.S. House of Representatives from Texas's 32nd district
- Incumbent
- Assumed office January 3, 2025
- Preceded by: Colin Allred

Member of the Texas House of Representatives from the 115th district
- In office January 9, 2019 – January 3, 2025
- Preceded by: Matt Rinaldi
- Succeeded by: Cassandra Hernandez

Personal details
- Born: Julie Elizabeth Johnson; May 2, 1966 (age 60) Kansas City, Kansas, U.S.
- Party: Democratic
- Spouse: Susan Moster (m. 2014)
- Children: 2
- Education: University of Texas, Austin (BA); University of Houston (JD)
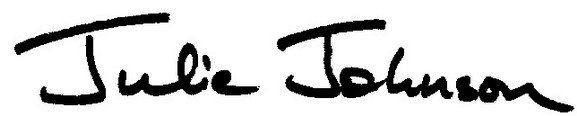
- Signature
- Website: House website Campaign website

Julie Elizabeth Johnson (born May 2, 1966) is an American politician and attorney serving as a U.S. representative from Texas's 32nd congressional district since 2025. Previously, she served as a member of the Texas House of Representatives from 2019 to 2025. An out lesbian, Johnson is the first openly LGBTQ+ member of Congress from a Southern state. She is a member of the Democratic Party.

Johnson was first elected to Congress in 2024, succeeding Colin Allred, who unsuccessfully ran for U.S. Senate instead of re-election. She ran for re-election in 2026, but lost renomination to Allred in a primary runoff.

== Education ==
Johnson earned a Bachelor of Arts degree from the University of Texas at Austin and a Juris Doctor from the University of Houston Law Center.

== Career ==
Johnson defeated incumbent Republican Matt Rinaldi in the 2018 Texas House of Representatives elections. She is one of Dallas County's first two openly gay legislators, and the first member of the Texas House with a spouse of the same gender.

In 2021, Johnson and the Texas House Democratic Caucus left the state, traveling to Washington D.C. in order to delay voting on any new bills in a special July session. Texas House Republicans voted to arrest the elected members to compel their attendance, though they did not have the jurisdiction to do so.

In June 2023, Johnson announced that she would run for the United States House of Representatives in Texas's 32nd congressional district in the 2024 elections, as incumbent Colin Allred was running for the U.S. Senate. She defeated Brian Williams in the Democratic Party primary election and won the November general election.

Based on the 2025 Texas redistricting, Johnson filed to run for election in Texas's 33rd congressional district. Allred, who initially announced a campaign for U.S. Senate, dropped out of that race and announced plans to challenge Johnson in the 33rd district in December 2025. Allred defeated Johnson in the primary runoff on May 26, 2026, with Johnson receiving 46% of the vote to Allred's 54%.

== U.S. House of Representatives ==
=== Tenure ===
Johnson was sworn in to the 119th United States Congress on January 3, 2025.

=== Committee assignments ===
- Committee on Foreign Affairs
  - Subcommittee on Europe
  - Subcommittee on South and Central Asia
- Committee on Homeland Security
  - Subcommittee on Border Security and Enforcement
  - Subcommittee on Emergency Management and Technology

=== Caucus memberships ===
- Congressional Equality Caucus (co-chair)
- New Democrat Coalition
- Black Maternal Health Caucus
- Congressional Ukraine Caucus
- Congressional Arts Caucus

== Personal life ==
Johnson came out as a lesbian in 1991. She and her wife, Susan Moster, married in San Francisco in 2014.

== Electoral history ==
2024 Texas's 32nd congressional district Democratic primary
| Party | Candidate | Votes | % |
|---|---|---|---|
| Democratic | Julie Johnson | 17,633 | 50.4 |
| Democratic | Brian Williams | 6,704 | 19.2 |
| Democratic | Justin Moore | 2,483 | 7.1 |
| Democratic | Jan McDowell | 1,722 | 4.9 |
| Democratic | Zachariah Manning | 1,617 | 4.6 |
| Democratic | Raja Chaudhry | 1,258 | 3.6 |
| Democratic | Callie Butcher | 1,169 | 3.3 |
| Democratic | Kevin Felder | 1,101 | 3.1 |
| Democratic | Alex Cornwallis | 909 | 2.6 |
| Democratic | Chris Panayiotou | 361 | 1.0 |
| Total votes | | 34,957 | 100.0 |

2024 Texas's 32nd congressional district election
| Party | Candidate | Votes | % |
|---|---|---|---|
| Democratic | Julie Johnson | 138,545 | 61.9 |
| Republican | Darrell Day | 85,170 | 38.1 |
| Total votes | | 223,715 | 100.0 |

2026 Texas's 33rd congressional district Democratic primary
| Party | Candidate | Votes | % |
|---|---|---|---|
| Democratic | Colin Allred | 31,482 | 44.0 |
| Democratic | Julie Johnson (incumbent) | 23,770 | 33.2 |
| Democratic | Carlos Quintanilla | 10,276 | 14.3 |
| Democratic | Zeeshan Hafeez | 6,083 | 8.5 |
| Total votes | | 71,611 | 100.0 |

2026 Texas's 33rd congressional district Democratic primary runoff
| Party | Candidate | Votes | % |
|---|---|---|---|
| Democratic | Colin Allred | 11,354 | 54.0 |
| Democratic | Julie Johnson (incumbent) | 9,677 | 46.0 |
| Total votes | | 21,031 | 100.0 |

== See also ==
- List of LGBTQ members of the United States Congress
- Women in the United States House of Representatives

U.S. House of Representatives
| Preceded by Colin Allred | Member of the U.S. House of Representatives from Texas's 32nd congressional district 2025–present | Incumbent |
U.S. order of precedence (ceremonial)
| Preceded by Brian Jack | United States representatives by seniority 392nd | Succeeded by Mike Kennedy |
