= Texas's 115th House of Representatives district =

American legislative district

Texas's 115th State House of Representatives district
Representative
Cassandra Garcia Hernandez; D–Dallas
- Demographics: 35.2% White; 14.0% Black; 21.7% Hispanic; 27.9% Asian
- Population (2020) • Voting age: 198,565; 156,391

The 115th district of the Texas House of Representatives contains parts of Coppell, Irving, Grapevine, Carrollton, Farmers Branch, Dallas, and Addison. The current representative is Cassandra Garcia Hernandez, who has represented the district since 2025.

== Members ==
- Matt Rinaldi
- Julie Johnson (until 2025)
- Cassandra Hernandez (since 2025)
