= United States Senate Environment Subcommittee on Chemical Safety, Waste Management, Environmental Justice and Regulatory Oversight =

The U.S. Senate Environment and Public Works Subcommittee on Chemical Safety, Waste Management, Environmental Justice and Regulatory Oversight is one a subcommittee of the U.S. Senate Committee on Environment and Public Works.

== Jurisdiction ==
- Superfund and Waste Issues
  - Environmental Protection Agency’s Office of Land and Emergency Management (OLEM)
  - Superfund Program
  - Brownfields Program
  - Solid Waste Disposal Act
  - Resource Conservation and Recovery Act, including recycling and electronic recycling, federal facilities and interstate waste
  - Comprehensive Environmental Response, Compensation, and Liability Act
  - Emergency Planning and Community Right to Know Act
  - Solid waste disposal and recycling
- Chemical Issues
  - Environmental Protection Agency's Office of Pollution Control and Prevention (OCSPP)
  - Chemical Safety and Hazardous Investigation Board
  - Toxic Substances Control Act
  - Toxics Release Inventory
  - Chemical Policy, including Chemical Security
  - Persistent organic pollutants
  - Risk Assessment
  - Environmental effects of toxic substances, other than pesticides
- Regulatory Oversight
  - Council on Environmental Quality
  - Morris K. Udall and Stewart L. Udall Foundation
  - National Environmental Policy Act (NEPA)
  - Responsibility for oversight of agencies, departments, and programs within the jurisdiction of the full committee, including oversight of environmental research and development, and for conducting investigations within such jurisdiction (The oversight jurisdiction pertains to good governance matters like mismanagement of federal funds and personnel issues, but not to policy matters like those within the jurisdiction of other subcommittees)
  - Environmental research and development

== History ==
The subcommittee was formerly known as the Subcommittee on Superfund and Environmental Health, but was renamed during committee organization of the 111th Congress to reflect its jurisdiction over major federal environmental health laws. From the 111th to the 116th Congress it was named Subcommittee on Superfund, Waste Management, and Regulatory Oversight.

== Members, 119th Congress ==
| Majority | Minority |
|---|---|
| John Curtis, Utah, Chair; Lindsey Graham, South Carolina; Dan Sullivan, Alaska; Roger Wicker, Mississippi; Jon Husted, Ohio | Jeff Merkley, Oregon, Ranking Member; Bernie Sanders, Vermont; Ed Markey, Massachusetts; Lisa Blunt Rochester, Delaware |
Ex officio
| Shelley Moore Capito, West Virginia | Sheldon Whitehouse, Rhode Island |

== Historical subcommittee rosters ==
=== 118th Congress ===
| Majority | Minority |
|---|---|
| Jeff Merkley, Oregon, Chair; Bernie Sanders, Vermont; Ed Markey, Massachusetts; Sheldon Whitehouse, Rhode Island; John Fetterman, Pennsylvania | Markwayne Mullin, Oklahoma, Ranking Member; John Boozman, Arkansas; Dan Sullivan, Alaska; Roger Wicker, Mississippi |
Ex officio
| Tom Carper, Delaware | Shelley Moore Capito, West Virginia |
