= United States Senate Committee on Environment and Public Works =

Standing committee of the United States Senate

Senate Environment and Public Works Committee
Standing committee
- Active United States Senate; 119th Congress

History
- Formed: February 4, 1977
- Succeeded: Committee on Public Buildings and Grounds; Committee on Public Works

Leadership
- Chair: Shelley Moore Capito (R); Since January 3, 2025
- Ranking Member: Sheldon Whitehouse (D); Since January 3, 2025

Structure
- Seats: 19 members
- Political parties: Majority (10): Republican (10); Minority (9): Democratic (8); Independent (1)

Jurisdiction
- Policy areas: Air pollution, Biodiversity, Bridges and dams, Environmental policy, Environmental management, Environmental science, Federal buildings, Fisheries and wildlife, Flood control, Highways and roads, Infrastructure generally, Light pollution, Marine debris, Noise pollution, Nuclear safety, Recycling, Soil contamination, Waste management, Water pollution, Water resources
- Oversight authority: Appalachian Regional Commission, Council on Environmental Quality, Delta Regional Authority, Economic Development Administration, Federal Highway Administration, General Services Administration, Mississippi River Commission, Morris K. Udall and Stewart L. Udall Foundation, Nuclear Regulatory Commission, Tennessee Valley Authority, U.S. Army Corps of Engineers, United States Environmental Protection Agency, U.S. Chemical Safety and Hazard Investigation Board, U.S. Fish and Wildlife Service
- House counterpart: House Committee on Energy and Commerce, House Committee on Natural Resources, House Committee on Science, Space, and Technology, House Committee on Transportation and Infrastructure

Subcommittees
- Clean Air, Climate and Nuclear Safety; Fisheries, Water, and Wildlife; Chemical Safety, Waste Management, Environmental Justice, and Regulatory Oversight; Transportation and Infrastructure

Meeting place
- 304 Dirksen Senate Office Building; Washington, D.C.

Website
- epw.senate.gov

Rules
- Rule XXV.1.(h), Standing Rules of the Senate; Rules of the Committee on Environment and Public Works

The United States Senate Committee on Environment and Public Works is responsible for legislation and oversight of the natural and built environment and for studying matters concerning environmental protection and resource conservation and utilitization.

== Jurisdiction ==
In accordance of Rule XXV of the United States Senate, all proposed legislation, messages, petitions, memorials, and other matters relating to the following subjects is referred to the Senate Committee on Environment and Public Works:

1. Air pollution;
2. Construction and maintenance of highways;
3. Environmental aspects of Outer Continental Shelf lands;
4. Environmental effects of toxic substances, other than pesticides;
5. Environmental policy;
6. Environmental research and development;
7. Fisheries and wildlife;
8. Flood control and improvements of rivers and harbors, including environmental aspects of deepwater ports;
9. Noise pollution;
10. Nonmilitary environmental regulation and control of nuclear energy;
11. Ocean dumping;
12. Public buildings and improved grounds of the United States generally, including federal buildings in the District of Columbia;
13. Public works, bridges, and dams;
14. Regional economic development;
15. Solid waste disposal and recycling;
16. Water pollution; and,
17. Water resources.

The Senate Committee on Environment and Public Works is also charged to "study and review, on a comprehensive basis, matters relating to environmental protection and resource utilization and conservation, and report thereon from time to time."

== Members, 119th Congress ==
Majority	Minority
Shelley Moore Capito, West Virginia, Chair; Kevin Cramer, North Dakota; Cynthia Lummis, Wyoming; John Curtis, Utah; Lindsey Graham, South Carolina (until July 11, 2026); Dan Sullivan, Alaska; Pete Ricketts, Nebraska; Roger Wicker, Mississippi; John Boozman, Arkansas; Jon Husted, Ohio; Darline Graham, South Carolina (from July 21, 2026)	Sheldon Whitehouse, Rhode Island, Ranking Member; Bernie Sanders, Vermont; Jeff Merkley, Oregon; Ed Markey, Massachusetts; Mark Kelly, Arizona; Alex Padilla, California; Adam Schiff, California; Lisa Blunt Rochester, Delaware; Angela Alsobrooks, Maryland

== Subcommittees ==
Subcommittee	Chair	Ranking Member
Clean Air, Climate, and Nuclear Innovation and Safety	Cynthia Lummis (R-WY)	Mark Kelly (D-AZ)
Fisheries, Wildlife, and Water	Pete Ricketts (R-NE)	Adam Schiff (D-CA)
Chemical Safety, Waste Management, Environmental Justice and Regulatory Oversight	John Curtis (R-UT)	Jeff Merkley (D-OR)
Transportation and Infrastructure	Kevin Cramer (R-ND)	Angela Alsobrooks (D-MD)

== Chairs ==
The committee has gone through several iterations starting in 1838. A list of these chairs is below.

=== Chairs of the Senate Committee on Public Buildings, 1819–1821 ===
Name	Party	State	Start	End
Jonathan Roberts	Democratic-Republican	PA	1819	1821

=== Chairs of the Senate Committee on Public Buildings, 1838–1857 ===
Name	Party	State	Start	End
William Fulton	Democratic	AR	1838	1841
Alexander Barrow	Whig	LA	1841	
John Kerr	Whig	MD	1841	1842
William Dayton	Whig	NJ	1842	1843
Sidney Breese	Democratic	IL	1843	1845
Simon Cameron	Democratic	PA	1845	1846
Jesse Bright	Democratic	IN	1846	1847
Robert Hunter	Democratic	VA	1847	1851
James Whitcomb	Democratic	IN	1851	1852
Charles James	Democratic	RI	1852	1853
James Bayard	Democratic	DE	1853	1857

=== Chairs of the Joint Committee on Public Buildings and Grounds, 1857–1883 ===
Name	Party	State	Start	End
Jesse Bright	Democratic	IN	1857	1861
Solomon Foot	Republican	VT	1861	1866
Gratz Brown	Republican	MO	1866	1867
William Fessenden	Republican	ME	1867	1869
Justin Morrill	Republican	VT	1869	1878
Henry Dawes	Republican	MA	1878	1879
Charles Jones	Democratic	FL	1879	1881
Edward Rollins	Republican	NH	1883	1881

=== Chairs of the Senate Committee on Public Buildings and Grounds, 1883–1947 ===
Name	Party	State	Start	End
William Mahone	Readjuster Republican	VA	1883	1887
Leland Stanford	Republican	CA	1887	1893
George Vest	Democratic	MO	1893	1895
Matthew Quay	Republican	PA	1895	1899
Charles Fairbanks	Republican	IN	1899	1905
Francis Warren	Republican	WY	1905	
Nathan Scott	Republican	WV	1905	1911
George Sutherland	Republican	UT	1911	1913
Claude Swanson	Democratic	VA	1913	1918
James Reed	Democratic	MO	1918	1919
Bert Fernald	Republican	ME	1919	1926
Irvine Lenroot	Republican	WI	1926	1927
Henry Keyes	Republican	NH	1927	1933
Tom Connally	Democratic	TX	1933	1942
Francis Maloney	Democratic	CT	1942	1945
Charles Andrews	Democratic	FL	1945	1946

=== Chairs of the Senate Committee on Public Works, 1947–1977 ===
Name	Party	State	Start	End
Chapman Revercomb	Republican	WV	1947	1949
Dennis Chavez	Democratic	NM	1949	1953
Edward Martin	Republican	PA	1953	1955
Dennis Chavez	Democratic	NM	1955	1962
Pat McNamara	Democratic	MI	1962	1966
Jennings Randolph	Democratic	WV	1966	1967

=== Chairs of the Senate Committee on Environment and Public Works, 1977–present ===
Name	Party	State	Start	End
Jennings Randolph	Democratic	WV	1977	1981
Robert Stafford	Republican	VT	1981	1987
Quentin Burdick	Democratic	ND	1987	1992
Pat Moynihan	Democratic	NY	1992	1993
Max Baucus	Democratic	MT	1993	1995
John Chafee	Republican	RI	1995	1999
Bob Smith	Republican	NH	1999	2001
Harry Reid	Democratic	NV	2001	
Bob Smith	Republican	NH	2001	
Jim Jeffords	Independent	VT	2001	2003
Jim Inhofe	Republican	OK	2003	2007
Barbara Boxer	Democratic	CA	2007	2015
Jim Inhofe	Republican	OK	2015	2017
John Barrasso	Republican	WY	2017	2021
Tom Carper	Democratic	DE	2021	2025
Shelley Moore Capito	Republican	WV	2025	present

== Ranking Members ==
A list of ranking members is below.

Name	Party	State	Start	End
James Burrill	Whig	RI	1819	1821
Richard Bayard	Whig	DE	1837	1839
William Merrick	Whig	MD	1839	1841
William Fulton	Democratic	AR	1841	1842
Alfred Cuthbert	Democratic	GA	1842	1843
William Dayton	Whig	NJ	1843	1847
Presley Spruance	Whig	DE	1847	1849
John Clarke	Whig	RI	1849	1853
George Badger	Whig	NC	1853	1855
Thomas Pratt	Whig	MD	1855	1857
Daniel Clark	Republican	NH	1857	1861
Jesse Bright	Democratic	IN	1861	1862
John Henderson	Democratic	MO	1862	1863
Willard Saulsbury	Democratic	DE	1863	
John Henderson	Democratic	MO	1863	1864
Thomas Hendricks	Democratic	IN	1864	1865
Gratz Brown	Republican	MO	1865	1866
Lyman Trumbull	Republican	IL	1866	1867
Reverdy Johnson	Democratic	MD	1867	1869
John Stockton	Democratic	NJ	1869	1875
Henry Cooper	Democratic	TN	1875	1877
Eli Saulsbury	Democratic	DE	1877	1879
Henry Dawes	Republican	MA	1879	1881
Charles Jones	Democratic	FL	1881	1887
George Vest	Democratic	MO	1887	1893
Justin Morrill	Republican	VT	1893	1895
George Vest	Democratic	MO	1895	1903
Charles Culberson	Democratic	TX	1903	1913
George Sutherland	Republican	UT	1913	1917
Francis Warren	Republican	WY	1917	1919
James Reed	Democratic	MO	1919	1929
Henry Ashurst	Democratic	AZ	1929	1933
Henry Keyes	Republican	NH	1933	1937
Warren Austin	Republican	VT	1937	1938
Frederick Hale	Republican	ME	1938	1941
Warren Barbour	Republican	NJ	1941	1943
Robert Taft	Republican	OH	1943	1947
John Overton	Democratic	LA	1947	1948
Dennis Chavez	Democratic	NM	1948	1949
Harry Cain	Republican	WA	1949	1953
Dennis Chavez	Democratic	NM	1953	1955
Edward Martin	Republican	PA	1955	1959
Francis Case	Republican	SD	1959	1962
John Cooper	Republican	KY	1962	1973
Howard Baker	Republican	TN	1973	1975
James Buckley	Republican	NY	1975	1977
Robert Stafford	Republican	VT	1977	1981
Jennings Randolph	Democratic	WV	1981	1985
Lloyd Bentsen	Democratic	TX	1985	1987
Robert Stafford	Republican	VT	1987	1989
John Chafee	Republican	RI	1989	1995
Max Baucus	Democratic	MT	1995	2001
Harry Reid	Democratic	NV	2001	
Bob Smith	Republican	NH	2001	2003
Jim Jeffords	Independent	VT	2003	2007
Jim Inhofe	Republican	OK	2007	2013
David Vitter	Republican	LA	2013	2015
Barbara Boxer	Democratic	CA	2015	2017
Tom Carper	Democratic	DE	2017	2021
Shelley Moore Capito	Republican	WV	2021	2025
Sheldon Whitehouse	Democratic	RI	2025	present

== Historical committee rosters ==
=== 118th Congress ===
Majority	Minority
Tom Carper, Delaware, Chair; Ben Cardin, Maryland; Bernie Sanders, Vermont; Sheldon Whitehouse, Rhode Island; Jeff Merkley, Oregon; Ed Markey, Massachusetts; Debbie Stabenow, Michigan; Mark Kelly, Arizona; Alex Padilla, California; John Fetterman, Pennsylvania	Shelley Moore Capito, West Virginia, Ranking Member; Kevin Cramer, North Dakota; Cynthia Lummis, Wyoming; Markwayne Mullin, Oklahoma; Pete Ricketts, Nebraska; John Boozman, Arkansas; Roger Wicker, Mississippi; Dan Sullivan, Alaska; Lindsey Graham, South Carolina

Subcommittee

Subcommittee	Chair	Ranking Member
Chemical Safety, Waste Management, Environmental Justice and Regulatory Oversight	Jeff Merkley (D-OR)	Markwayne Mullin (R-OK)
Clean Air, Climate and Nuclear Safety	Ed Markey (D-MA)	Pete Ricketts (R-NE)
Fisheries, Water, and Wildlife	Alex Padilla (D-CA)	Cynthia Lummis (R-WY)
Transportation and Infrastructure	Mark Kelly (D-AZ)	Kevin Cramer (R-ND)

=== 117th Congress ===
Majority	Minority
Tom Carper, Delaware, Chair; Ben Cardin, Maryland; Bernie Sanders, Vermont; Sheldon Whitehouse, Rhode Island; Jeff Merkley, Oregon; Ed Markey, Massachusetts; Tammy Duckworth, Illinois; Debbie Stabenow, Michigan; Mark Kelly, Arizona; Alex Padilla, California	Shelley Moore Capito, West Virginia, Ranking Member; Jim Inhofe, Oklahoma; Kevin Cramer, North Dakota; Cynthia Lummis, Wyoming; Richard Shelby, Alabama; John Boozman, Arkansas; Roger Wicker, Mississippi; Dan Sullivan, Alaska; Joni Ernst, Iowa; Lindsey Graham, South Carolina

Subcommittees

Subcommittee	Chair	Ranking Member
Chemical Safety, Waste Management, Environmental Justice and Regulatory Oversight	Jeff Merkley (D-OR)	Roger Wicker (R-MS)
Clean Air, Climate and Nuclear Safety	Ed Markey (D-MA)	Jim Inhofe (R-OK)
Fisheries, Water, and Wildlife	Tammy Duckworth (D-IL)	Cynthia Lummis (R-WY)
Transportation and Infrastructure	Ben Cardin (D-MD)	Kevin Cramer (R-ND)

=== 116th Congress ===
Majority	Minority
John Barrasso, Wyoming, Chair; Jim Inhofe, Oklahoma; Shelley Moore Capito, West Virginia; John Boozman, Arkansas; Roger Wicker, Mississippi; Mike Rounds, South Dakota; Joni Ernst, Iowa; Richard Shelby, Alabama; Dan Sullivan, Alaska; Kevin Cramer, North Dakota; Mike Braun, Indiana	Tom Carper, Delaware, Ranking Member; Ben Cardin, Maryland; Bernie Sanders, Vermont; Sheldon Whitehouse, Rhode Island; Jeff Merkley, Oregon; Kirsten Gillibrand, New York; Cory Booker, New Jersey; Ed Markey, Massachusetts; Tammy Duckworth, Illinois; Chris Van Hollen, Maryland

Subcommittees

Subcommittee	Chair	Ranking Member
Clean Air and Nuclear Safety	Mike Braun (R-IN)	Sheldon Whitehouse (D-RI)
Fisheries, Water and Wildlife	Kevin Cramer (R-ND)	Tammy Duckworth (D-IL)
Superfund, Waste Management, and Regulatory Oversight	Mike Rounds (R-SD)	Cory Booker (D-NJ)
Transportation and Infrastructure	Shelley Moore Capito (R-WV)	Ben Cardin (D-MD)

=== 115th Congress ===
Majority	Minority
John Barrasso, Wyoming, Chair; Jim Inhofe, Oklahoma; Shelley Moore Capito, West Virginia; John Boozman, Arkansas; Roger Wicker, Mississippi; Deb Fischer, Nebraska; Jerry Moran, Kansas; Mike Rounds, South Dakota; Joni Ernst, Iowa; Richard Shelby, Alabama; Dan Sullivan, Alaska	Tom Carper, Delaware, Ranking Member; Ben Cardin, Maryland; Bernie Sanders, Vermont; Sheldon Whitehouse, Rhode Island; Jeff Merkley, Oregon; Kirsten Gillibrand, New York; Cory Booker, New Jersey; Ed Markey, Massachusetts; Tammy Duckworth, Illinois; Chris Van Hollen, Maryland

=== 114th Congress ===
Majority	Minority
Jim Inhofe, Oklahoma, Chair; David Vitter, Louisiana; John Barrasso, Wyoming; Shelley Moore Capito, West Virginia; Mike Crapo, Idaho; John Boozman, Arkansas; Jeff Sessions, Alabama; Roger Wicker, Mississippi; Deb Fischer, Nebraska; Mike Rounds, South Dakota; Dan Sullivan, Alaska	Barbara Boxer, California, Ranking Member; Tom Carper, Delaware; Ben Cardin, Maryland; Bernie Sanders, Vermont; Sheldon Whitehouse, Rhode Island; Jeff Merkley, Oregon; Kirsten Gillibrand, New York; Cory Booker, New Jersey; Ed Markey, Massachusetts

Source: 2013 Congressional Record, Vol. 159, Page S296
