= Brian Williams (surgeon) =

American surgeon and academic (born 1969)

Brian H. Williams
- Born: 1969 (age 56–57); Chicopee, Massachusetts
- Education: United States Air Force Academy; University of South Florida; Harvard Medical School
- Known for: Trauma surgery
- Scientific career
- Workplaces: University of Chicago; Grady Memorial Hospital; University of Texas Southwestern Medical Center

Brian H. Williams (born 1969) is an American surgeon and Professor of Trauma Surgery at the University of Chicago. He specialises in acute surgery and critical care. Alongside his work as a clinician, Williams looks to end racial inequities in healthcare and end the American epidemic of gun violence.

== Early life and education ==
Williams was born in Chicopee, Massachusetts. As a child Williams wanted to play American football for the Miami Dolphins. Williams trained in aeronautical engineering in the United States Air Force Academy and graduated in 1991. He worked as an engineer for the United States Air Force for six years. During his time in the Air Force he befriended many doctors and nurses, which made him interested in a career in medicine. At the age of 27, Williams applied to medical school. He prepared for his medical school exams by purchasing an “MCAT study guide, completed every question, and read every explanation for the answers; cover to cover!”. He chose to attend the University of South Florida for his medical studies. Williams was a medical intern at the Harvard Medical School, before starting a fellowship in trauma surgery at the Grady Memorial Hospital. Here he witnessed the challenges that communities of colour faced accessing healthcare. He has said that at the start of his career he didn't call out inequality because he feared “backlash and marginalization from non-black colleagues”.

== Career ==
In 2010, Williams was appointed to the faculty at the University of Texas Southwestern Medical Center, where he was eventually promoted to Associate Professor. Williams led the trauma team who responded to the 2016 shooting of Dallas police officers; a national tragedy whereby five police officers were shot at a march against police brutality. He has said that it was this moment that made him aware of the intersection of racism, gun violence and healthcare. The Mayor of Dallas, Mike Rawlings, named Williams chairman of the Dallas Police Citizens Review Board. Williams since has since launched the podcast Race, Violence & Medicine.

Williams relocated to Chicago to better support victims of gun violence in 2019. In the first few months of his time in Chicago, he was made Director of the University of Chicago Medical Center intensive care unit. During the COVID-19 pandemic, his usual surgeries were replaced by overseeing the COVID-19 unit, where he identified that "almost every patient was Black". Williams investigated why Black people were disproportionately impacted by the COVID-19 pandemic.

In May 2023, Williams announced that he would run for the United States House of Representatives for Texas's 32nd congressional district in the 2024 elections. He lost the election to Julie Johnson.

== Selected publications ==
- Kim, Christina J.; Yeatman, Timothy J.; Coppola, Domenico; Trotti, Andy; Williams, Brian; Barthel, James S.; Dinwoodie, William; Karl, Richard C.; Marcet, Jorge (2001). "Local Excision of T2 and T3 Rectal Cancers After Downstaging Chemoradiation". Annals of Surgery. 234 (3): 352–359. doi:10.1097/00000658-200109000-00009. ISSN 0003-4932. PMC 1422026. PMID 11524588.
- Costantini, Todd W.; Coimbra, Raul; Holcomb, John B.; Podbielski, Jeanette M.; Catalano, Richard; Blackburn, Allie; Scalea, Thomas M.; Stein, Deborah M.; Williams, Lashonda; Conflitti, Joseph; Keeney, Scott (2016). "Current management of hemorrhage from severe pelvic fractures: Results of an American Association for the Surgery of Trauma multi-institutional trial". Journal of Trauma and Acute Care Surgery. 80 (5): 717–725. doi:10.1097/TA.0000000000001034. ISSN 2163-0755. PMID 26958799. S2CID 206093573.
- Ball, Chad G.; Williams, Brian H.; Tallah, Clarisse; Salomone, Jeffrey P.; Feliciano, David V. (December 21, 2013). "The impact of shorter prehospital transport times on outcomes in patients with abdominal vascular injuries". Journal of Trauma Management & Outcomes. 7 (1): 11. doi:10.1186/1752-2897-7-11. ISSN 1752-2897. PMC 3933386. PMID 24360286.

== Personal life ==
Williams is married to Kathianne, with whom he has a daughter.
