= History of the Houston Police Department =

Houston Police Department
- Motto: Order through law, justice with mercy

Agency overview
- Formed: 1841

Jurisdictional structure
- Legal jurisdiction: Municipal

Operational structure
- Sworn members: over 5,000
- Agency executive: Jose "J." Noe Diaz, Chief of Police

Facilities
- Helicopters: 5

Website
- www.houstontx.gov/police/index.html

The history of the Houston Police Department started with the founding of the City of Houston. While the department's beginning was humble, it grew more advanced as technology became available and was able to handle the various challenges that would plague various cities as well as some of the more distinctive aspects of its geography.

== Chronology ==
=== Early history ===
The first constable of the then recently incorporated capital city of the Republic of Texas, Houston was elected in 1837, making him the city's first law enforcement officer. The police force itself was not established until 1841 by Houston's first marshal, Daniel Busley.

There was little patrolling of the city during the next 20 years. It was up to the individual businessmen to hire guards to protect their establishments. In 1866, Marshal Isaac C. Lord began to establish HPD as a proper police force by setting hiring rules, regulations, and requirements in hiring practices for recruits. The new policies were reviewed by the city council and were added to the City Charter (Art 308–344). Isaac C. Lord lobbied and succeeded in adopting the dress uniform which states, "The dress of the members of the police force shall be navy blue, indigo die and all wool." (Art 333, 1866) It was also during this period on March 10, 1860, that C. Edward Foley became the first to fall in the line of duty while on patrol.

In 1873, during Reconstruction, R. Van Patton was appointed City Marshal. It was during his tenure that the force hired its first black officers. The officer complement at this time was 12, with an even number of black and white officers. The second-in-command Deputy Marshal was the first black officer to hold that position among those hired. During this year, the "Manual of the Houston Police Force" was written and the salary was set at $60 a month where it would stay until 1915.

1894 was the year where the department hired its first two police detectives and purchased a patrol wagon. The term "Wagon call" is still used to this day when it is required to transport prisoners.

In 1900, The title "City Marshal" was changed to "Chief of Police", however it remained an elected position. J.G. Blackburn was the last person to have the title "City Marshal" and with re-election, the first to have the title "Chief of Police." In the same year, the first female matron was hired and the name of the force was changed to "The Houston Police Department."

=== 1910–1919 ===
On August 23, 1910, the first police chief was appointed by the mayor instead of being elected. Later that year, Houston purchased its first police car, along with the formation of the city's first traffic squad to help maintato Houston's bustling streets at that time.

On April 21, 1911, Mayor Baldwin Rice hires Frank Hamer to assist special officers who were investigating a gang that had killed several HPD officers. Frank Hamer would later become a legendary Texas Ranger.

The first raise in several decades occurred in 1915 from $60 to $75 a month along with the reduction of work hours (from 12 hours to 8) on their shift.

At the beginning of the First World War, there were two military bases in Houston. One was Ellington Field along (Then Known as) Galveston Road and Camp Logan (Later to become Memorial Park). These two camps Trained, Housed Bomber Cadets and The 24th Infantry Regiment, respectively. The Northern troops resented the segregation of Houston and things came to a head when a black soldier was arrested for interfering in the arrest of a black woman. A clash between the black soldiers and the Houston Police Department erupted shortly thereafter that resulted in the deaths of 16 whites (5 of them police officers), several black soldiers, two white soldiers, and one Hispanic soldier. It was only after Mayor Moody called for federal troops and Martial law declared was the riot eventually quelled.

In 1918 HPD hired Eva Jane Bacher as its first policewoman and in 1921 was assigned to the Public Moral and safety squad (Which later turned into the Vice Division), making her the first female Detective.

=== 1920–1929 ===
In 1920, HPD revised its application examination to cover its duties, responsibilities, various procedures and firearms policies.

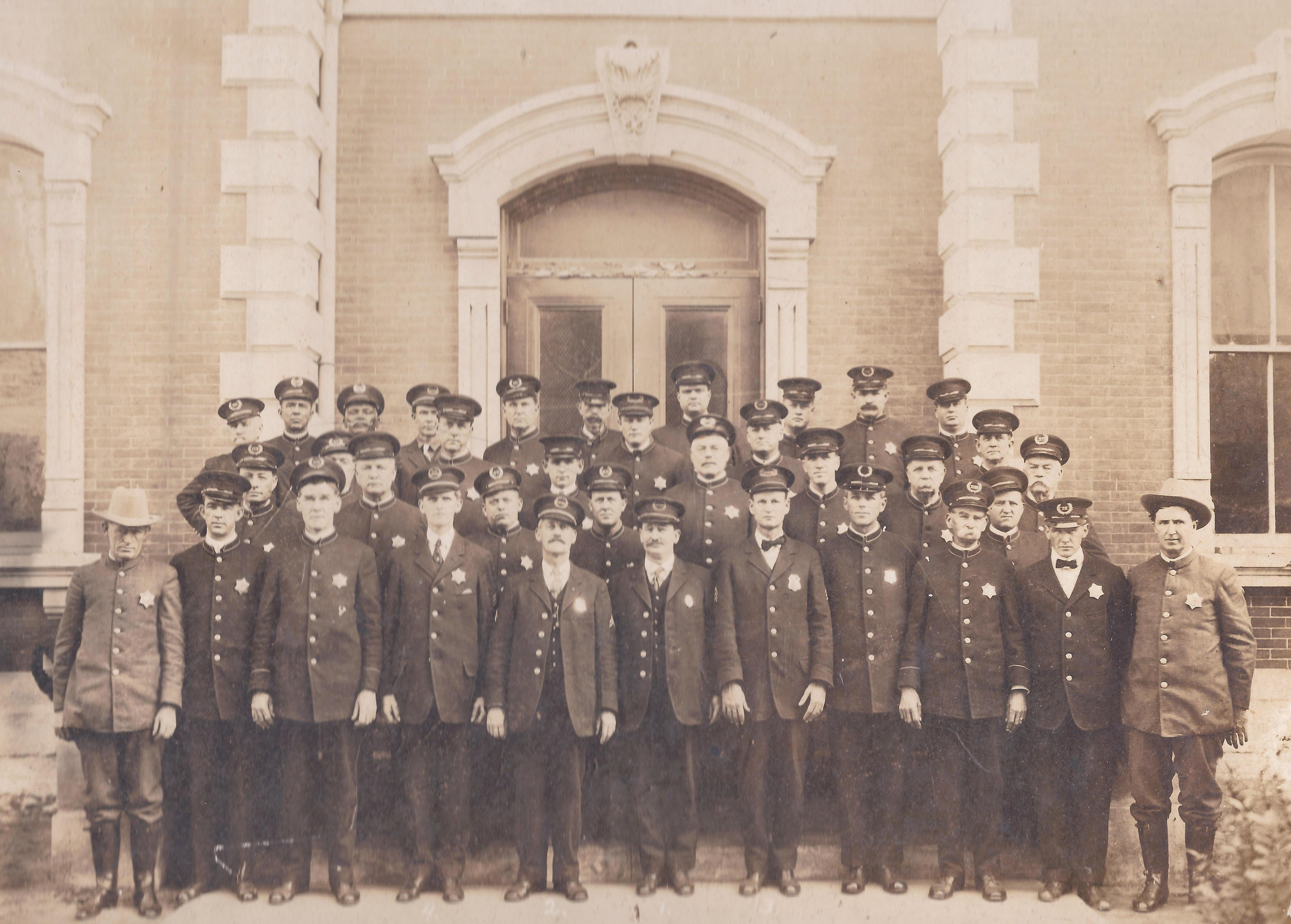
Houston Police Department – 1920

Additionally, the following tools and policies were added to the police department in

1921:

- Traffic signals were installed and a traffic squad of 22 officers operated them.
- The Department grew to 171 personnel.
- The Title of Chief of Police was changed to Superintendent of Police.
- The Police Burial Fund was established at a cost of 50 cents a month and paid a benefit of $200 initially but was raised to $500 in time.

In 1925, the City of Houston initiated the delivery of complimentary municipal healthcare services for all city employees at the Historic Jefferson Davis Hospital, located in Houston's Historic First Ward. HPD moved to its new building that same year.

On October 19, 1926, Magnolia Park, the first substation was opened. The assigned officers were close to the ship channel and were kept busy with prohibition violations and were charged with intercepting all forms of liquor.

The HPD Mounted Horse Traffic Squad

The remainder of the decade saw the following milestones:

1927:

- The Mounted Traffic Squad was established in Downtown.
- HPD formed it first Police band.
- Automatic Traffic signals were upgraded and installed.
- The first radio was installed in patrol cars. They were turned to KPRC (the only station in town) and regular programming was interrupted to broadcast dispatch police calls.

1928:

- The city Ordinance that forced officers to keep their firearms out of sight under their coats was repealed.
- HPD started hiring woman as "matrons" instead of female Police officers. Matrons would be responsible for young females, juvenile boys and girls.

1929:

- Manpower was increased to 330 officers, 36 patrol cars and 23 motorcycles.
- The Houston Chronicle reported that the position of police woman was abolished because Chief McPhail believed that a woman on the police force was unnecessary and that policing was a man's job.

=== 1930–1939 ===
In 1930, the Touchy Furniture Store Robbery highlighted a deficiency in the firepower of HPD's weapons. Several .38 caliber shots struck but failed to penetrate the suspect's vehicle as it got away resulting in the deaths of 2 officers. As a result, the city started to issue .44 caliber guns instead.

Also in 1930:

- A third substation, North Side was opened.
- The Homicide Division was created.
- The first Police school was formed.
- Percy Heard was sworn as Superintendent of Police.
- Two Thompson Machine Guns were purchased for the apprehension of "desperate criminals."
- 425 Special (Reserve) Officers were sworn in by the Mayor and under the call of the Superintendent of Police during Emergencies.
- A "Shadow Box" was installed allowing victims to view suspects without being seen as well.

In 1933 The Police and Fire Departments were merged briefly under the Department of Safety. Two-way radios were installed in the patrol cars and received called from the police radio station KGZB. This allowed for "Scout Cars" to be deployed more effectively and designed to create a feeling of friendliness and safety between the department and citizens.

The milestones of the 1930s included:

1935:

- The average response time was reduced from 5.8 to 3.81 minutes.
- The City purchased 1,000 parking meters for downtown.

1936:

- The Federal Communications Commission named HPD as one of the first five departments in the United States to be licensed.
- The Missing Persons Division was established.

1937:

- The Accident Division was created.
- Each officer was issued one uniform per year.

1939:

- Force strength reached 444 officers.

Additionally in 1939, HPD started its first Police Academy Class held at the Sam Houston Coliseum under the direction of Captain L.D. Morrison that lasted 5 weeks. The first class that graduated was on August 16, 1939, and is referred to as the Class of '39.

=== 1940–1949 ===
In 1940, HPD had grown to 466 officers. With the increased use of the police radios, a PBX operator was hired to handle police calls. In the same year the Department started giving voluntary blood tests to determine the intoxication of suspected drunken drivers.

In 1941, Neal Picket was elected Mayor of Houston named Ray Ashworth as Chief of police. This move sparked controversy because he was originally the Chief of Police from San Antonio. Counsel members were hoping to hire a new chief from within the rank and file of the current police department. Ashworth quickly instituted the following changes:

- All officers could have one day off per week.
- All officers had to have a standardized nickel-plated badge with either a number or rank.
- The purchase of 47 new police cars, which doubled the size of the fleet.
- One-man units to cover more area and reduce crime.
- All members of the department were to be fingerprinted; this resulted in 15 officers being terminated for having police records.
- Created the Houston Civilian Auxiliary Police Division to be used in emergencies which was necessary due to a number of officers going into the military.

In 1945, The Houston Police Officers Association (HPOA) was established.

=== 1950–1959 ===
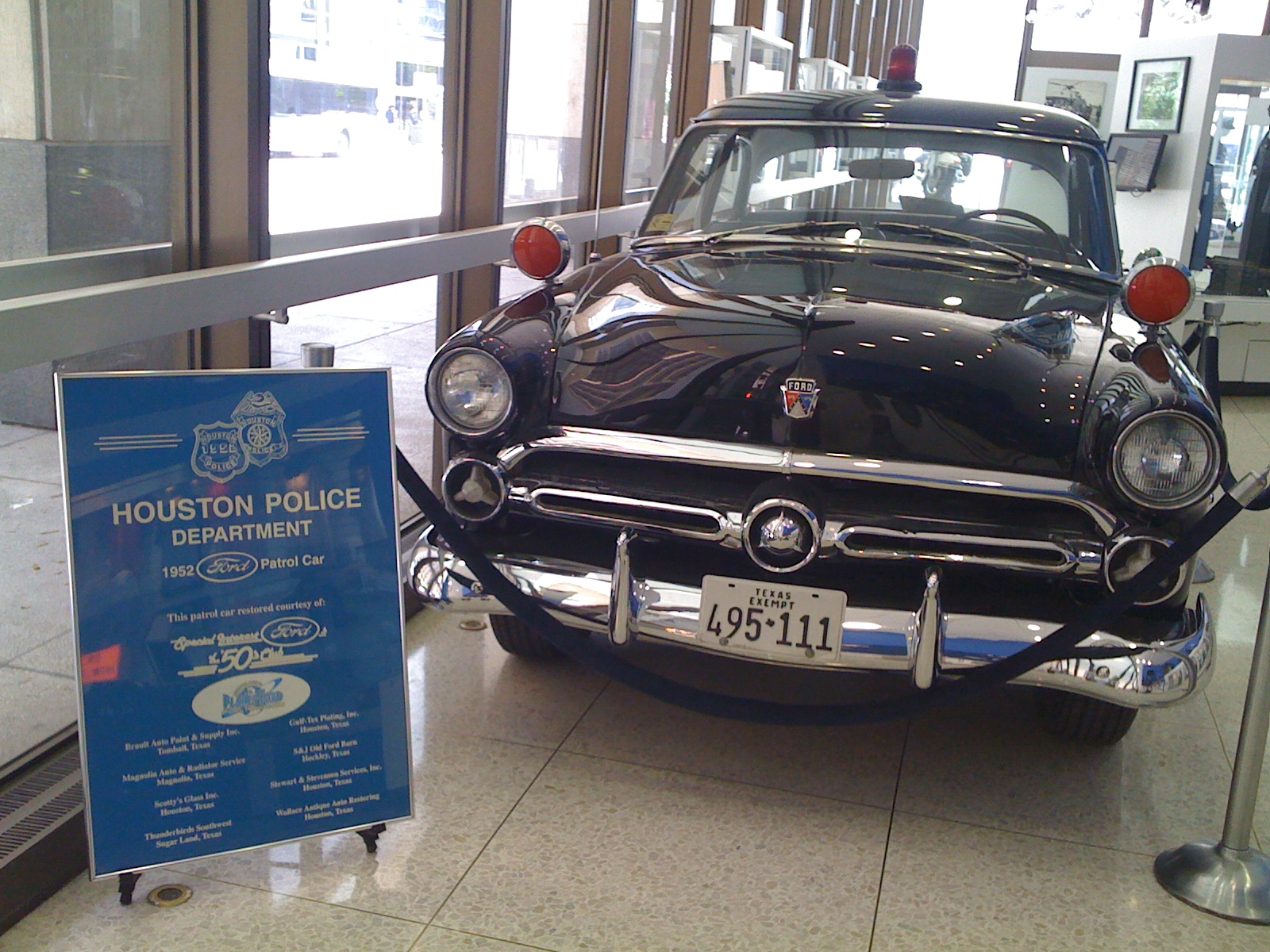
A 1952 Ford Customline patrol car that was used by the Houston Police Department

In October 1950, a new City ordinance took effect that reduced the police work week from 48 to 40 hours. In 1951, Chief Morrison announced a "booster squad" designed to be deployed at certain crime-infested parts of the city that proved to be quite effective in cutting down crime in areas they worked in. Also in that year, the first of the three-wheeled motorcycles to direct traffic and write tickets.

In 1953 The 100 Club, a 501(c)(3) charity, was founded by Leopold L. Meyer, Ray R, Elliot, R.H. Abercrombie, William A. "Bill" Smith and James Marion West Jr. to help Police officers by providing assistance when officers are hurt or killed in the line of duty.

In 1954, Chief Jack Heard was appointed Chief of Police. Under his tenure he implemented the following changes:

- Once again women were allowed to join the police department. Female cadets were hired as dispatchers, jail matrons, or to perform clerical duties.
- Officers were permitted to wear light weight long sleeved shirts.
- 20 walkie-talkies were purchased for the Narcotics, Vice, and other divisions.
- Obtained the first Police Chaplain.

Chief Heard would also be elected to Harris County Sheriff in 1972.

1956 Carl Shuptrine was appointed Chief and in 1957 he reassigned 70 officers from downtown foot patrol to patrol cars to help get to Houston's newly annexed areas. This was an effort to "decentralize" the Police Department and to economize manpower. This included 17 civilian jailers and in 1959 purchased two lots for future substations.

=== 1960–1969 ===
In 1960, some of the requirements were trainee applicants during this time frame were to be:

1. 21 years of age or older
2. 5'8" to 6'5" tall
3. A high school graduate or have passed an entrance exam given by the University of Houston
4. In excellent physical condition with no history of asthma, hay fever, tuberculosis, or diabetes
5. Free from any physical defects or deformations.
6. Live within 150-mile (240 km) radius of Houston

Other milestones for the 1960s include:

1960: The Central Intelligence Division was created to track "hoodlums".

1962:

- Snap-on ties would be worn for safety reasons.
- Peace Officers Memorial Day (May 15) was designated by congress and signed into law by President John F. Kennedy.

1964: Herman B. Short was appointed as the New Chief.

1965: The State of Texas established the Texas Commission on Law Enforcement Officers Standards and Education (TCLEOSE)

1966:

- Total force was 1,337 officers patrolling 446 square miles (1,160 km^{2}).
- The Department's bomb squad was established.

1967:

- Officers received 22% pay raise spread out over a 3-year period.
- The Department formed the Community relations Division.

In May 1967, protests erupted at Texas Southern University due to the Vietnam War and racial tensions of the time. In the aftermath of the police raid, one officer was found dead and 488 students were arrested. Mayor Welch then planned community relations training program for police officers in the aftermath of the riot. He appointed 300 neighborhood aides from impoverished areas to provide a communication link to City Hall.

In 1968, the Department incorporated a hookup system between the Texas Department of Motor Vehicles in Austin for immediate vehicle registration verification purposes and established a direct link with the National Crime Information Center (NCIC) in Washington, DC. Another feature added was the teleprinter, which simultaneously typed an offense report as a new record was entered into the system.

By the end of 1969, the department had grown to 1,577 Officers and 223 civilian personnel.

=== 1970–1979 ===
In 1970, the Helicopter Patrol Division was formed with three leased Hughes 300 helicopters which gave the city the largest helicopter division in the nation. Bulletproof vests were also introduced to the rank and file and an initial purchase of 30 were made.

The Houston Police Department and the People's Party II clashed in the area of St. John's Baptist Church on 2800 Dowling Street. Members of the People's Party II had dared any HPD unit to drive down Dowling. As a result, Chief Short declared that any citizen of Houston or HPD would not be denied access to any public street. This resulted in a gun battle in which the leader, Carl Hampton, was killed.

Other milestones in the 1970s include:

1970:

- City Council approved the hiring of 30 civilians to replace police officers in clerical and telephone work
- The first in-house videotape training for in-service was established.
- Officers were able to use scholarship funds from the 1969 Omnibus crime Bill to attend colleges and universities.
- The number of officers who had a bachelor's degree stood at 95.
- The Texas Commission on Law Enforcement Officers and Standards Education (TCLEOSE) established minimum appointment standards for applicants to become peace officers.

1972: Chief Short issued a written version of a long-standing verbal policy against officers accepting rewards.

1973: City Council approves time-and-a-half overtime for all city employees.

- On September 19, Houston Police Officer David Huerta (Badge No. 2341) was killed in the line of duty while trying to apprehend a suspect who violated his restraining order. The suspect who shot him also shot his wife and committed suicide. Officer Huerta was a Jeff Davis High School graduate, attended South Texas Junior College and served in the United States Army as a Vietnam war veteran. He was survived by his wife, Connie, his 16-month-old daughter, parents, and his brother, Daniel, who went on to be a school police officer.
- December Carrol Lynn appointed to Chief of Police

1975:

- The department strength stands at 2,541 officers and 698 civilians.
- The monthly retirement pay for police personnel with 20 years of service base on 30% of their base salary.
- The number of radio channels was increased from 8 to 16. Each dispatcher had a computer CRT screen, which access information regarding stolen vehicles and pick-ups for other divisions.
- The Department formed a Special Weapons and Tactical (SWAT) Squad.

1976:

- Officers were allowed to wear short-sleeve shirts for the first time and allowed uniform officers to wear a mustache.

1977:

- The Department adopted the San Jose model to begin an organized field training program.
- The Department announced that officers would receive incentive pay for immediate and advanced certificates issued by TCLEOSE.
- City Council agreed to purchase 500 portable two-way radios.
- The Department established an Internal Affairs Division whose first cases included the beating and drowning of Joe Campos Torres and throw down shooting of Randall Webster in 1977.
- As an outgrowth of the Torres case, the department worked with Hispanic leaders including Dr. Guadalupe Quintanilla to develop closer community ties which led to a conversation Spanish class for Police Officers at Ripley House Community Center in the East end of Houston.
- Chief Caldwell reintroduced the issuance of nightsticks or batons as a defensive weapon.

1978 The department hired a psychologist (Dr. Gregory Riede) to screen police applicants and provide counseling services.

1979: The department announced a new neighborhood crime program called, "Houstonians on Watch". The program combined police patrol with citizen awareness and designed to cover selected high-crime areas.

- Chief Carrol Lynn was sentenced to 12 years in federal prison and five years' probation for an extortion conviction.

One of the more significant advances came in 1979 when The Houston Police Department became one of only five police departments in the nation to have an automated fingerprint identification system (AFIS). AFIS was described as a computerized minutia-based fingerprint identification system, capable of storing approximately 375,000 criminal fingerprint records with descriptive information and an additional 12,000 unidentified latent fingerprints.

=== 1980–1989 ===
In 1982, Mayor Kathryn J. Whitmire was elected the first female mayor of the City of Houston and appointed Lee P. Brown as Chief of Police, who was the first person of color appointed to be Chief of Police and the first to hold a Doctorate. Brown succeeded Harry D. Caldwell. He instituted several changes including "Neighborhood Oriented Policing. " which is described as the following: "Neighborhood Oriented Policing is an interactive process between police officers assigned to specific beats and the citizens that either work or reside in these beats to mutually develop ways to identify problems and concerns and then assess viable solutions by provided available resources from both the police department and the community to address the problems and/or concerns."

Along with community policing, he instituted the following changes as well:

1983:

- HPD mandated 40 hours of in-service training annually for officers.
- There were 3,465 officers, of which 266 were female
- The Positive Interaction Program (PIP) to involve citizens in fighting crime by establishing committees in selected areas.
- The livery on HPD squads (with a silver shield on the front doors which has 'HOUSTON POLICE' and the 'RADIO PATROL' above the shield) was phased out where a white stripe with red inserts were phased in. The main switchboard phone number was later replaced with the 911 logo.

1984:

- HPD planned to re-institute a mount patrol downtown.
- The Park Police were transferred to the Houston Police Department.

1985:

- HPD hired the Department's only civilian Academy Director.
- Under state law; Drug testing began for police applicants.

1986:

- The Academy classes were shut down for budgetary reasons.
- "For-cause" drug testing was started for both officers and civilians.

1987: The first command station (Westside) was opened. 1988:

- The FBI reported that the past year was the first since 1977 that Houston had less than 400 homicides, with 339.
- City Council restored the three percent pay raise revoked in 1985.

=== 1990–1999 ===
In 1990 Chief Brown left Houston to be the Police Commissioner for the New York Police Department. On January 20 of that year, Mayor Whitmire announced that Deputy Chief Elizabeth "Betsy" Watson as the new Chief of Police making her the first female to hold that position.

Chief Watson established the Personal Concerns Program that gave attention to and provided action to employees demonstrating behavior problems. The Chief also requested and was approved by city council to abolish the deputy chief rank and replaced it with assistant chiefs to flatten the department's hierarchy.

Since the Police Academy was closed for three years, this resulted in the loss of 600 positions, dropping the number below 4,000 personnel. Against the wishes of Chief Watson, the 60 College credit hour requirements were dropped.

In March 1991, The Texas Supreme Court ruled on the long running lawsuit known as Lee V. City of Houston. The Court held that "if a particular job assignment require no knowledge of police work in the Department, and entails no supervision of classified officers, the position need not be classified." But it held that the Act did prohibit non-classified employees from supervising classified employees.

With the election of Robert "Bob" Lanier in November 1991 and his swearing in ceremony two months later, he pledged to put the equivalent of 655 additional officers on the streets of Houston. After 47 days in office, Mayor Lanier announced the replacement of Chief Watson with former HPD Deputy Chief Sam Nuchia who was then serving as an assistant U.S. Attorney in Houston.

Immediately up on his appointment Chief Nuchia he went to a "back-to-basics" policing approach that would make crime fighting his first priority. He did away with one man units in patrol cars and made as many two-man units as possible.

Of the 655 officers added to the patrol duties, 361 were on patrol, 150 in investigative positions, and 144 on special assignments. The Airport Police department and City Marshals were merged into the HPD.

Other achievements of the decade included:

1993:

- The Special Response Group (SRG) was formed to handle large crowds and special events
- The Downtown Pistol range in operation since 1933 was closed.

1994:

- On January 6, Officer Michael P. Roman (#5068) was killed in a vehicular accident on 3800 N. Main when his vehicle was struck by driver who failed to yield the right of way of an emergency vehicle and was charged with the violation.
- The response time was lowered to 4.4 minutes from 6.1 minutes in 1991
- New pay increases were established for officers with 17 years of seniority and sergeants and lieutenant with 3 and 8 years of seniority respectively.

1995:

- The Woman's Advisory Council was created to review concerns of female officers who, incidentally, comprised 11% of the police force.
- Officers with 20 or more years of service were eligible for the new Deferred Retirement Option Program (DROP)

1996: Planning for police services were undertaken with the beginning of the Kingwood annexation process.

In January 1997, Chief Clarence Bradford was sworn in as the new Chief of Police.

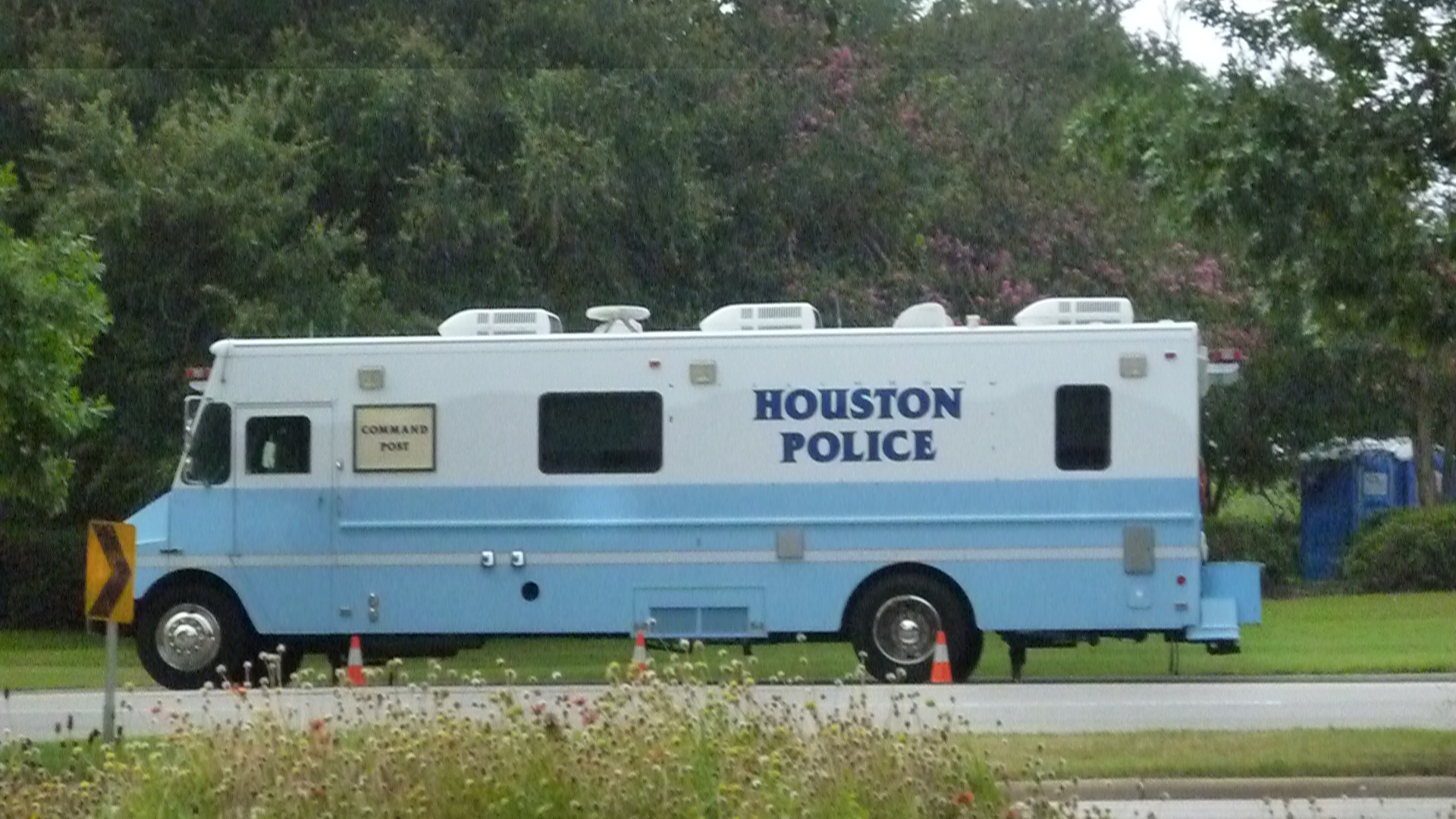
One of HPD's Mobile Command posts

One of the first priorities he accomplished was the elimination of the promotional ranks of sergeant and lieutenant. Judge Lynn Hughes granted a motion making it possible for the Police Department to fill vacant sergeant and lieutenant through promotions. However, the promotions were to be acting positions and would not accrue pension or seniority until the case known as the Edwards Lawsuit was settled.

HPD Headquarters at 1200 Travis

It was also during 1997 that then Governor George W. Bush signed into law the new "meet and confer" legislation for the Houston Police Department. The legislation provided for officers to vote for a representative organization to negotiate for them with the City administration on a compensation package that would be brought before City Council.

In December 1997 the new 26-floor high-rise police headquarters (the former Houston Natural Gas Building) located at 1200 Travis was dedicated. The Mayor, Past chiefs of Police, other dignitaries and guests were on hand for the opening ceremony. The new facility was equipped with the latest security system and would house 2,200 employees.

Lee P. Brown, the former Chief of Police, was elected as City Mayor in November 1997 and took the oath of office in January 1998. He had become the second former head of the police Department to become the Mayor of Houston (I.C. Lord was the first in 1875).

=== 2000–2005 ===
2000:

The Houston Police Department announced the discontinuation of their "baby blue" livery that was painted on their Chevrolet Caprice Police vehicle and on their popular fleet of 1997, 1998 and a small percentage of some 1999 Ford Crown Victoria Police Interceptor patrol cars. The paint was a special order and cost significantly higher and the city settled with white cars using the blue "Houston Police" logo. The last remaining "baby blue" car was retired from the department in late 2006 or early 2007. Some of the retired "baby blue" cruisers are sold at auctions with all police equipment stripped and returned to be reused in other cruisers.

2002:

On November, an investigative report made by KHOU about improper lab procedures and accuracy of results. It also pointed out various deficiencies of various lab personal in experience and education. The severity of the lack of credibility lay question of a number of cases, including those that were later convicted and put on death row. The scandal involving the DNA Lab would last well into the decade. The other major milestones affecting HPD are: December: HPD suspends DNA testing after an investigate report and audit.

2003:

January: Harris County District attorney Chuck Rosenthal announces plans to retest DNA evidence from hundreds of cases.

March: Josiah Sutton, convicted with faulty DNA evidence, is released from prison after serving more than four years for a rape he did not commit.

October: The toxicology division, which tests for alcohol and drugs, is shuttered after its head fails a proficiency test.

2004:

August: Police Chief Harold Hurtt reveals that evidence from thousands of cases dating back to the 1970s was improperly stored in HPD's property room.

October: George Rodriguez is released from prison after serving 17 years for a rape he did not commit. He was convicted on faulty work of the lab's serology division.

2005:

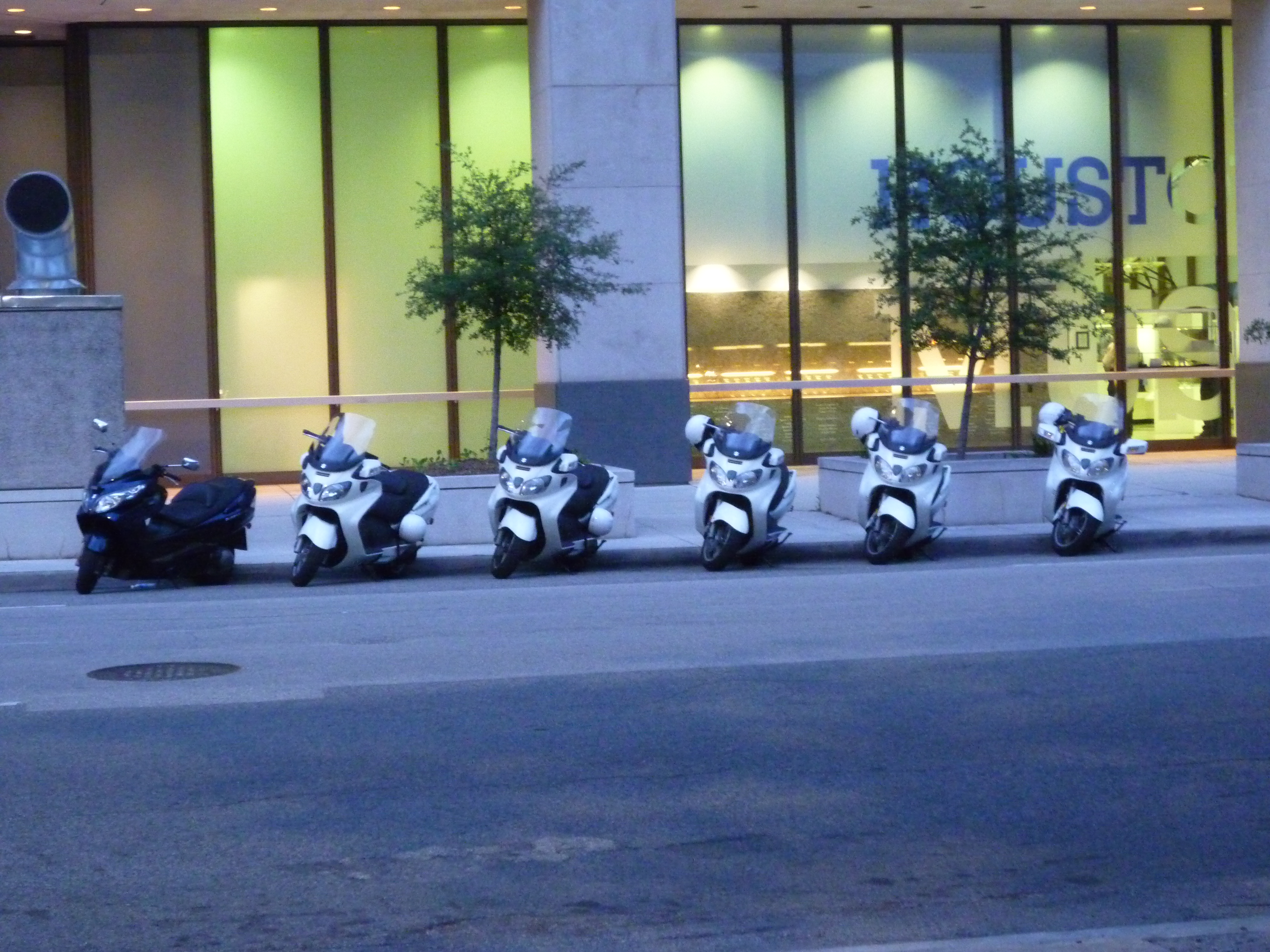
MRT Scooters outside of 1200 Travis

- Mayor White Launches the "Safe Clear" program to help clear disabled vehicles from freeways to help reduce the number of accidents on the freeways.
- Independent investigation led by Michael R. Bromwich begins probe of crime lab and property room.
- HPD receives accreditation from a national organization for all areas of its crime lab except the DNA-testing division.
- Four intersections in Downtown Houston were used as testbeds for red light camera equipment. After a vending contract was approved, the enforcement goes online September 1, 2006, to which those running a red light (there are 50 locations) are fined a $75 civil fine as opposed to a $225 moving violation which goes against the vehicle operator.
- October 26, Six year veteran HPD Officer Reuben De Leon Jr. was murdered in the line of duty in an apartment complex.

=== 2006–2009 ===
2006:

- Studies released in February 2006 indicate that Safe Clear has been successful during its fledgling year. There were 1,533 less freeway accidents in 2005, a decrease of 10.4% since Safe Clear's implementation.
- DNA division resumes testing after receiving accreditation.
- On September 21, twelve-year veteran Houston Police Officer Rodney Joseph Johnson is killed in the line of duty.

2007:

- Red Light cameras go fully operational and go online.
- Bromwich team releases its final report recommending, among other things, free DNA testing in 413 questionable serology cases, and the appointment of a special master to review 180 serology cases with "major issues."
- HPD says it will review about 200 narcotics cases following the suspension of an HPD crime laboratory analyst accused of failing to properly secure evidence in drug investigations.
- Bill White started a new program called the "Mobility Response Team". This task force, staffed by traffic officers that will patrol within the loop looking for, and being dispatched to, traffic problems. They will report traffic light outages, issue parking citations, help clear and direct traffic around minor accidents. The duties will only involve surface streets and will be using scooters for transportation.
- A new Police Property Room starts construction.
- HPD is considering using remote aerial surveillance drones to help with traffic mobility and assisting with various police duties such as SWAT situations. The drones that are currently being looked at cost $30,000, but will be offset by the manufacturer during the studies.
- On October 6, 2007, allegations arose of employees cheating on an open-book proficiency test.
- Hurtt to spend an $24 million on overtime pay through 2010. The money would continue to bolster an understaffed force as police commanders try to increase their ranks. The overtime that is planned would be about equal to 500,000 police hours of which would help bolster various departments including, vice, Westside patrol and traffic enforcement, among other areas including a new 60-member crime reduction unit that will serve as a citywide tactical squad.
- On October 26, 2007, HPD revealed that since the red light cameras went online, it has generated $6 Million in revenue and are looking at a variety of programs to fund including three specially designed DUI enforcement vehicles, camera upgrades in squad cars, and additional officers for school zone speed enforcement and patrol.
- In November 2007, HPD newly formed Crime Reduction Unit hit the streets targeting Class 1 crimes.
- In November 2007, HPD started installed a system called PlateScan by its manufacturer, California-based Civica Software, which would allow for several cameras installed on a Police Cruiser to scan license plates and automatically run them through a database that would immediately alert the officer if the plate is wanted as a stolen vehicle, on an Amber alert list, or on a warrant. This saves the officer from having to individually type in every plate and does it at a faster pace.

The New BEAR taken in front of HPD Headquarters at 1200 Travis

- On December 24, 23 Hispanic police officers filed a lawsuit alleging discrimination against HPD. Main complaints is that they are underpaid and a heavier workload than their non-Hispanic coworkers.
- In January 2008, SWAT unveiled a new 12-ton armored vehicle called "BEAR" (Ballistic Engineered Armored Response vehicle) and is able to carry 15 fully equipped officers and offer better armor protection and can be used in high risk arrests and riot situations. The old vehicle will be used as a backup. The vehicle didn't come from taxpayer money, but rather a gift from the 100 club of Houston.

2008

- On January 25, The Houston Police Department has once again closed the DNA division of its troubled crime lab, following the resignation of its chief and the suspension of two other employees, ending an investigation into an alleged cheating scandal.
- On February 7, rumors that HPD is looking at selling the HPD complex at 61 Reisner and the Headquarters at 1200 Travis to raise funds to build a new compound for its force. The location of the future compound isn't available.
- February 8

HPD reported the firing of its sixth cadet fired in recent times. The latest was found to be stealing from the police break-room and has since come under fire for lowering its hiring practices to attract new recruits.
The use of Bait cars in high crime areas has started to produce arrests in several stings being implemented in certain parts of the city.

- On May 8 at 5005 Little York construction will commence on a new facility for the Mounted Patrol division, which will include more land for the horses to roam.
- As of June 19, the number of police officers in uniform increased to 5,000 for the first time since 2005 with today's graduation class.
- On June 23 requested that the more than 2000 convenience stores to get the jump on the new ordinance that will take effect at the start of 2010, which requires additional safety measures such as at least two surveillance cameras, a drop safe and a silent alarm at each store in the hopes to curb robberies and provide a database of crimes for better law enforcement.
- On June 30, Chief Harold Hurtt welcomed the latest police recruits as they start their training and being in the 200th class held by the city. Members of "Class 200" will have a special epaulet of white stars on a navy background on their cadet uniforms to acknowledge the milestone.

2009

- March 3 A series of investigative reports by KTRK's Wayne Dolcefino put in question on the effectiveness, ethics, and work practices of The Mobility Response Team. After the report, one supervisor has been reassigned and the whole MRT unit faces an internal affairs investigation.
- April 27 Houston expects to increase its Bait car fleet to 14, making it one of the largest in the Country. The Houston Police Foundation gave the bait car project an initial grant of $80,000, Several insurance companies; State Farm, Allstate, Kemper, Nationwide, and Farmers Insurance companies have made donations of vehicles and equipment to the program. Increasing losses due to an increase in stolen vehicles prompted the donation to help deter future crimes.
- June 18 The new 55,000-square-foot (5,100 m^{2}), $13 million property room, which is located at 1202 Washington is equipped with movable shelves and a large walk in freezer was completed. It will replace the older facility and will take approximately one year before all evidence is moved to the new location. This is part of the $134 million upgrade that HPD is currently undertaking. Chief Hurtt expressed hopes that the old facility would eventually be razed and that a new DNA lab would take its place.
- June 24 Sixteen year veteran Officer Henry Canales, working out of the auto theft division was shot during an undercover operation and later declared deceased at Ben Taub General Hospital, a second officer shot and killed one suspect and several others were captured after a short chase and subsequently convicted of his murder and both were sentenced to 60 years.
- July 2 The Mounted Patrol had moved into their new location at 5005 Little York. Reforestation is planned for this section of Memorial Park.
- August 26 HPD unveils a new tool that would allow patrol officers to check fingerprints in the field from FBI and other sources.

Lamarques McWilliams was arrested as a suspected serial Killer from August 2006 to September 2007, of 6 women and 9 sexual assaults in the Acres Homes area.

- October 28 An investigative united called "Special Crimes Division" has been formed to focus mainly on domestic crimes comprising the Sex Crimes and Family Violence units previously under the Homicide division.
- December 16 After Annise Parker's win of the Houston Mayoral runoff election, Police Chief Harold Hurtt announced that he intends to resign on December 30 after Parker announced she plans to assign a new Police Chief.

=== 2010—2019 ===
At the beginning of the year, HPD's Theft Division acquired access to Leadsonline, a privately owned online database of pawned merchandise to tap into the databases of the city's 133 pawnshops, junk yards, and thrift stores, as well as across the country. The access to this database allows to be able what was pawned, by who, and where. It has been considered a success because of the amount of property recovered and arrests made and has been said that it has more than made up for its $90,000 cost.

- January 26 Local community activists, including NAACP and LULAC call for a review of HPD by The U.S. Department of Justice because of a high increase in the number of shootings in 2009, in which law enforcement officers took part in 60 shootings across Harris County and killed 27 people. Houston police were involved in 29 shootings, killing 15 people.
- April 14 Charles A. McClelland, Jr. was sworn in by Mayor Parker. He signed up in May 1977 and worked his way up through the ranks in the Houston Police Department, from rookie to assistant chief in 1998, before being asked to step in as acting chief. A graduate of the University of Houston–Downtown with a bachelor's degree in Criminology and a master's degree in Sociology, and a Graduate from the FBI National Academy, he oversaw the department's implementation of Tasers and a real time crime analysis program.
- April 22, Mayor Parker requested Chief McClelland to approve officers to march in the Gay Pride Parade in full uniform. The request was approved and added a stipulation that officers must be off duty or on paid time off. *April 27 A new police station was opened near Harwin and Fondren streets. The 60,000-square-foot (5,600 m^{2}) substation was built on an old business college site and will house two narcotics squads, a first responder square, and a jail lock-up house for class C offenders.
- July 18 Harris County District Attorney Pat Lykos has called for the establishment of an emergency city-county DNA lab to dispose of thousands of untested cases. A temporary lab, which some officials say could be outfitted in vacant labs at the Texas Medical Center for $1.3 million, would meet local needs until the construction of a regional crime lab that is part of Harris County's long-range plans. He cited that the current Lab is unable to keep up with the backlog of cases that need to be completed, Mayor Parker is hesitant to do so because it wasn't included in HPD's $666 Million Budget.
- July 19 A decommissioned Boeing 737 was added acquired by State Representative Ted Poe for various HPD departments (SWAT and Bomb Squad) and various other national and local agencies for training.
- November 15 The Red Light program comes to an end after a proposition put to voters rejected the cameras.

2011:

- January 1: HPD reports that 2010 murders are down 7% at 267, compared to 287 from 2009. This is a continuing trend for the past five years. Factoring in population growth, Houston's murder rate dropped from 12.6 murders per 100,000 people in 2009 to 11.8 murders per 100,000 residents in 2010. It was also reported that based on preliminary statistics for 2010, HPD reported clearing 88 percent of its murder investigations, meaning the cases were solved or a killer was identified compared to 71 in 2009.
- July 21: The Chief announced that the police helicopters would have to fly reduced hours from 21 hours a day to 3 a day.
- July 24: The red light cameras started issuing tickets, after the U.S. District Judge Lynn Hughes on June 17, 2011, citing that the referendum violated the city charter despite the contract with American Traffic Solutions, which provided the camera equipment. Plans are underway to have this judicial ruling heard by the United States Court of Appeals for the Fifth Circuit.

2012:

- January 4: Mayor Annise Parker and Houston Police Chief Charles A. McClelland, Jr announced that city murder rate has been the lowest per capita, since 1965 to 198, a 26.4% drop from the previous year.
- July 2: HPD has announced that they are testing out several new car models to replace the Ford Crown Victoria, that is no longer being manufactured, with the Ford Police Interceptor, Dodge Charger, Chevrolet Caprice and a Chevrolet Tahoe. Vehicles will be repainted or replaced as needed. With the new vehicles, they are going with a new paint scheme of a black and white livery, as well as in the process of selecting new uniforms which would be more comfortable and allow for easier removal of bullet proof vests. 100 HPD police vehicles (from the 2011 Crown Victoria to Chevrolet Tahoe 9C1s) were painted in this livery using funds from asset forfeiture. Other TX cities (Austin and Missouri City since 2008, Dallas since 2010, Bastrop County) have reverted to black and white liveries.

2019:

- Pecan Park raid

2025:

- In January, a man published a video of Houston police officers using police vehicles to perform the doughnut driving maneuver during a snowstorm; the Houston Police Officers' Union responded that the man was "snitching" and published photos and videos of the man on their Facebook account, while union president Doug Griffith said: "You can complain all you want … We don’t go out there hunting people for complaining about police officers".
