= George Floyd protests in Texas =

2020 civil unrest after the murder of George Floyd

- Part of George Floyd protests
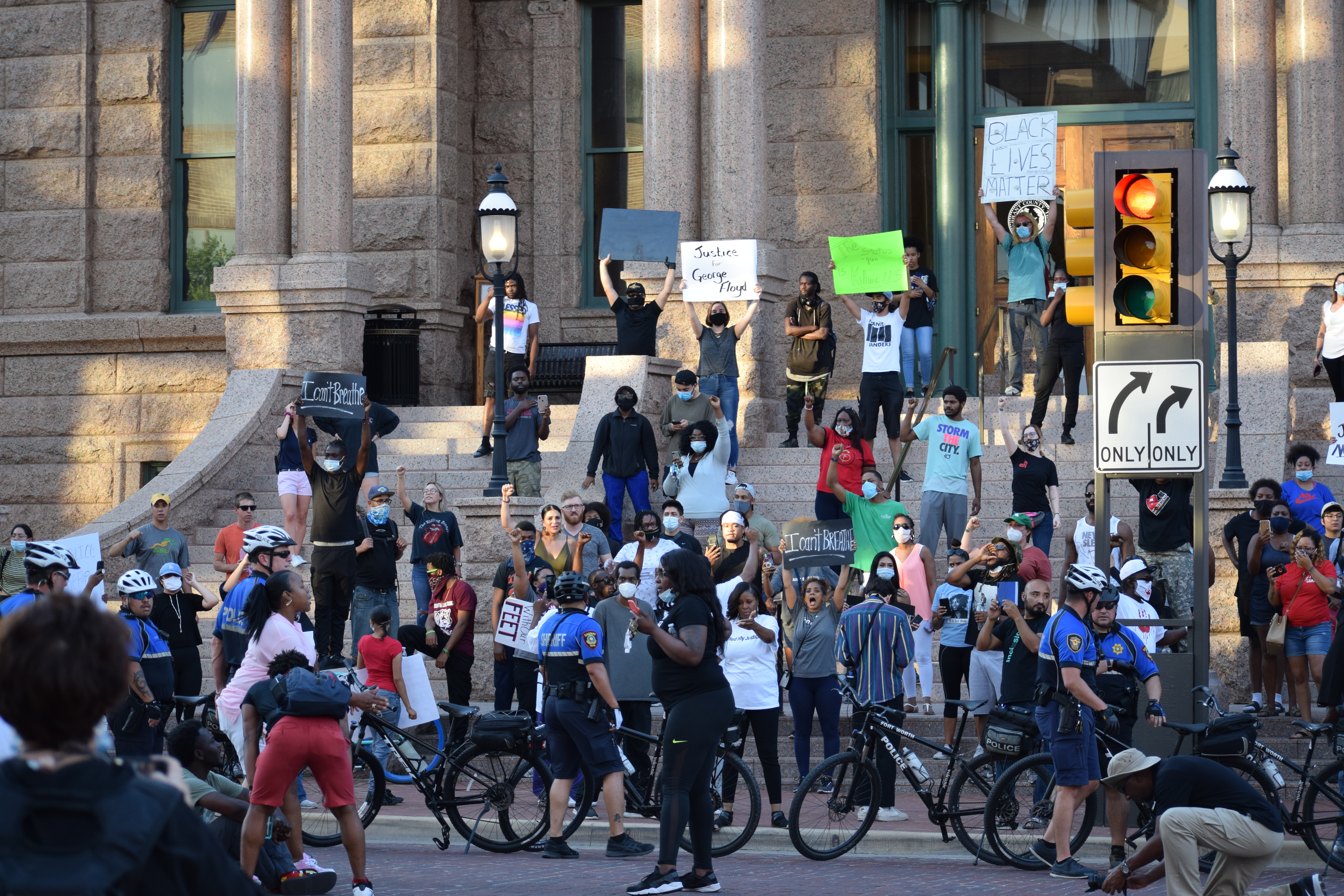
- Protesters and police in Fort Worth
- Date: May 28 – July 2020 (1 month and 3 days)
- Location: Texas, United States
- Caused by: Police brutality; Institutional racism against African Americans; Reaction to the murder of George Floyd; Economic, racial and social inequality

Cities in Texas in which a protest with about 100 or more participants was held

This is a list of protests in the U.S. state of Texas related to the murder of George Floyd.

== Locations ==
=== Abilene ===
Dozens marched around the city after gathering at the Abilene Police Department for a protest on May 31.

June 8: Hundreds marched from the Abilene Convention Center to the Martin Luther King Junior Memorial bridge.

=== Alpine ===
On June 6, hundreds of people marched through the streets to the Brewster County courthouse. One West Texas journalist stated that he believed it was the largest protest he had seen in the Big Bend area. Police criticism had recently flared due to racist comments reportedly made by Brewster County sheriff candidate Devon Portillo. Portillo blamed the racist comments on hackers.

=== Amarillo ===
A crowd of more than 100 marched from City Hall to Sam Houston Park starting around 10am on May 31. There were some conflicts with "armed individuals" and an opposing group that "came to protect the city and community from destruction."

=== Arlington ===
On Monday, June 1, the first protests over Floyd's murder occurred. As night fell, rioting began, with businesses near AT&T Stadium looted. Police arrested six people. Two hundred protesters gathered at Arlington City Hall on Tuesday, June 2.

=== Austin ===
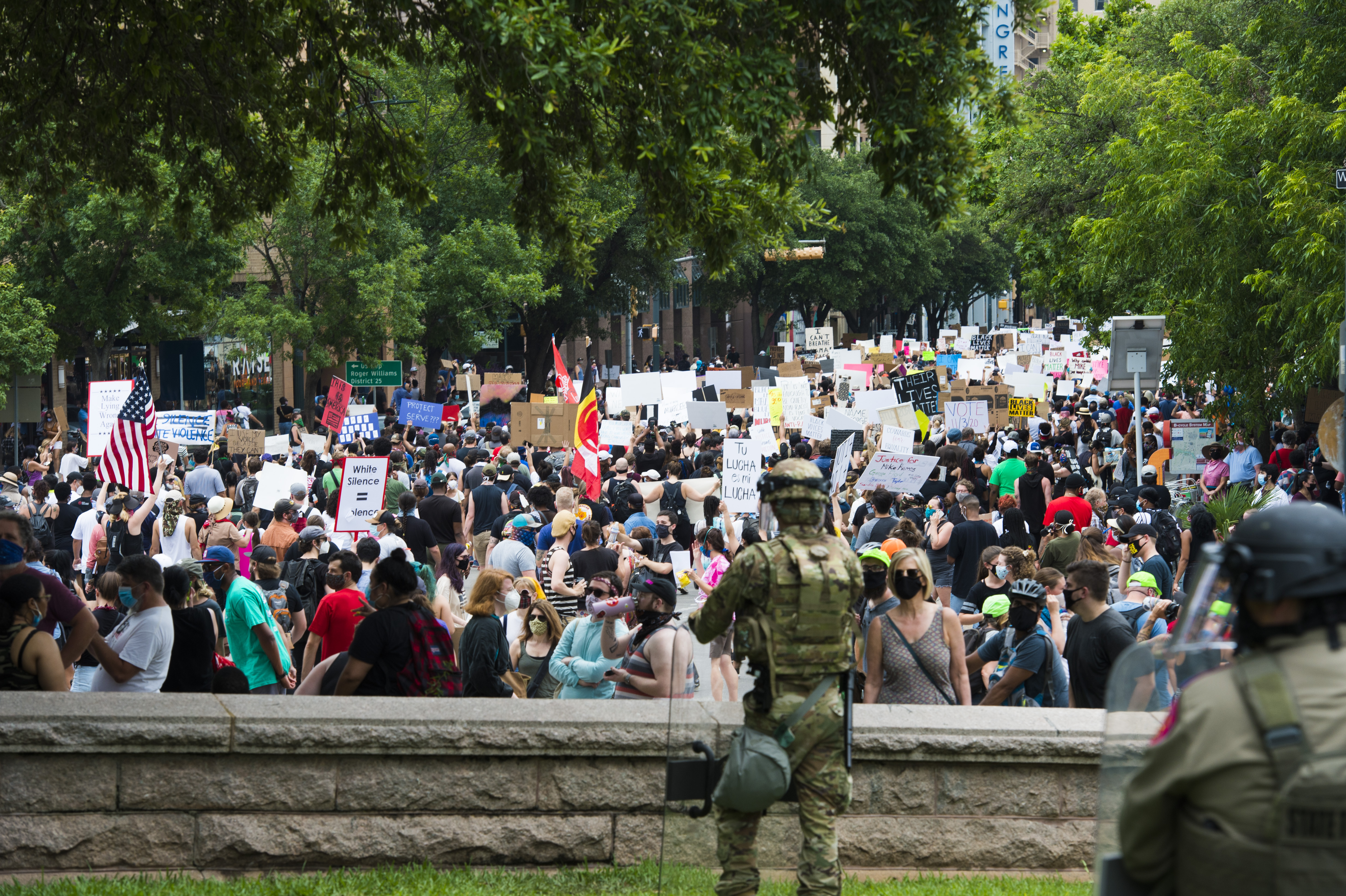
Police and Texas Army National Guard at a protest in Austin on May 31, 2020

Several dozen protesters demonstrated in front of the Austin Police Department headquarters the night of May 29–30, with nine ultimately arrested. On May 30, thousands of protesters again gathered outside police headquarters. They then climbed on to I-35, stopping traffic on both sides. Later in the night a car was set on fire and a store near the police headquarters was vandalized. APD reported that they were pelted with projectiles by some people in the crowd, including molotov cocktails. Demonstrators in Austin were also protesting over the killing of Mike Ramos on April 24, 2020, by Austin police officers; on May 29, Travis County District Attorney Margaret Moore announced that the shooting will go to a grand jury. On May 30, a sixteen year old protester was hospitalized after being shot by police in the head with a "beanbag" round. On May 31, a twenty year old protester was critically injured, after being shot with "less-lethal munition". The protester, named Justin Howell, suffered a fractured skull and brain damage. Volunteer medics picked up Howell's injured body, trying to get the police to give Howell medical attention. The police responded by firing "less-lethal munition" in the direction of the medics carrying Howell.

On July 25, Garrett Foster was killed in a shooting during a protest in Downtown Austin. Initial reports reveal that Foster was carrying a rifle when he approached a vehicle. A person in the vehicle pulled out a firearm and shot Foster. Foster was soon taken to the hospital where he was pronounced dead. His mother went on Good Morning America the following morning and claimed that Foster had been pushing his fiancée's wheelchair moments before he was killed. Daniel Perry was tried and convicted for the Murder of Garrett Foster.

=== Baytown ===
About a hundred protesters marched to the Baytown Police Department (BPD) after video was released showing the arrest of two men for swearing at officers arresting a man at a gas station. The protests were primarily targeted at Baytown Police officer Nathaniel Brown, who arrested the men. The family of Pamela Turner, who was killed by Baytown police in 2019, were in attendance.

=== Beaumont ===
Around three hundred people held a protest on May 28.

=== Brownsville ===
On June 3, around 100 people peacefully protested at Linear Park before marching towards the Brownsville Police Department and the Cameron County Courthouse.

=== Corpus Christi ===
Hundreds of people protested outside the City Hall building and marched their way towards downtown Corpus Christi on May 31. Social media posts falsely claimed the protest was more violent than it actually was.

=== Dallas ===
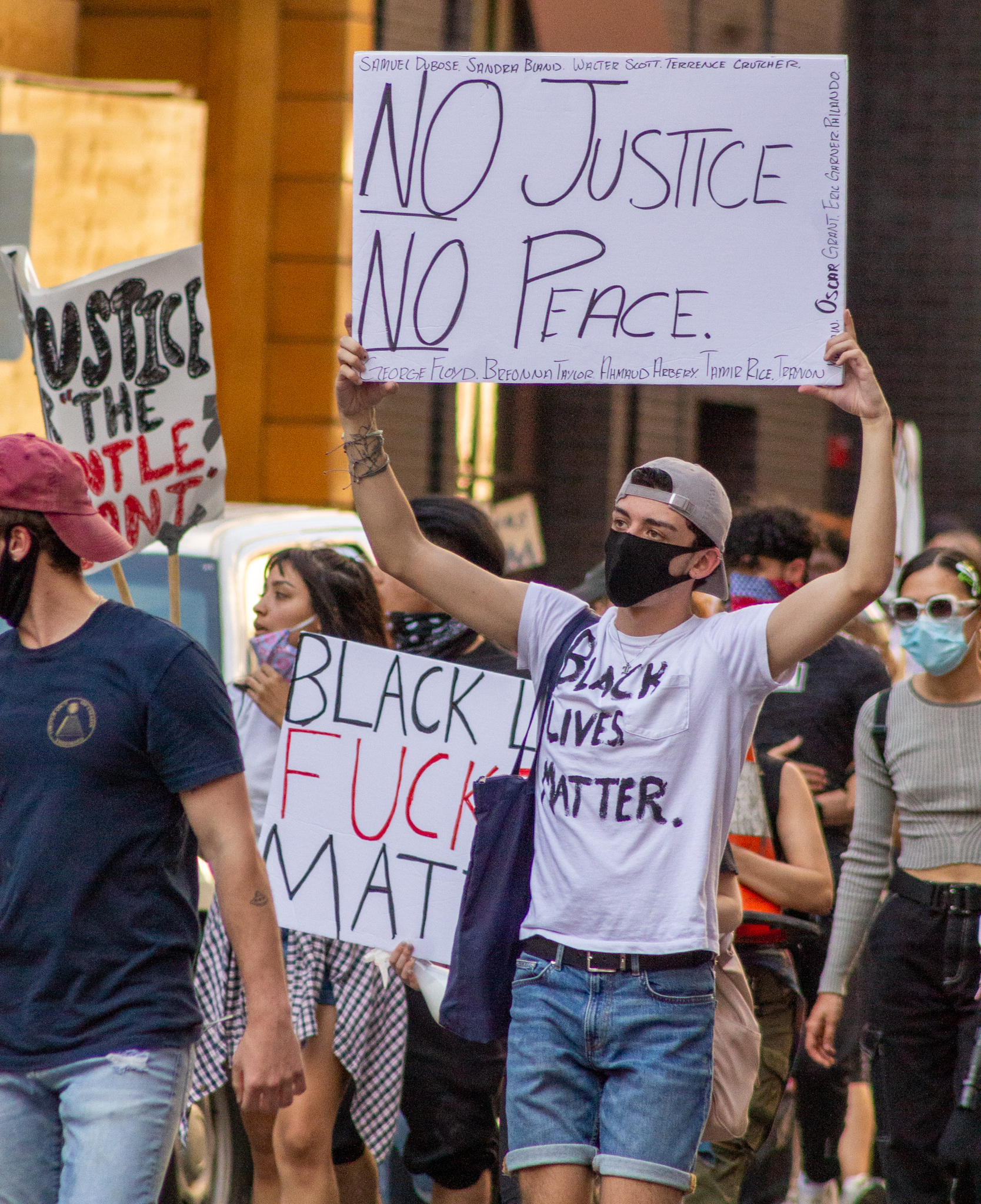
Dallas on May 31

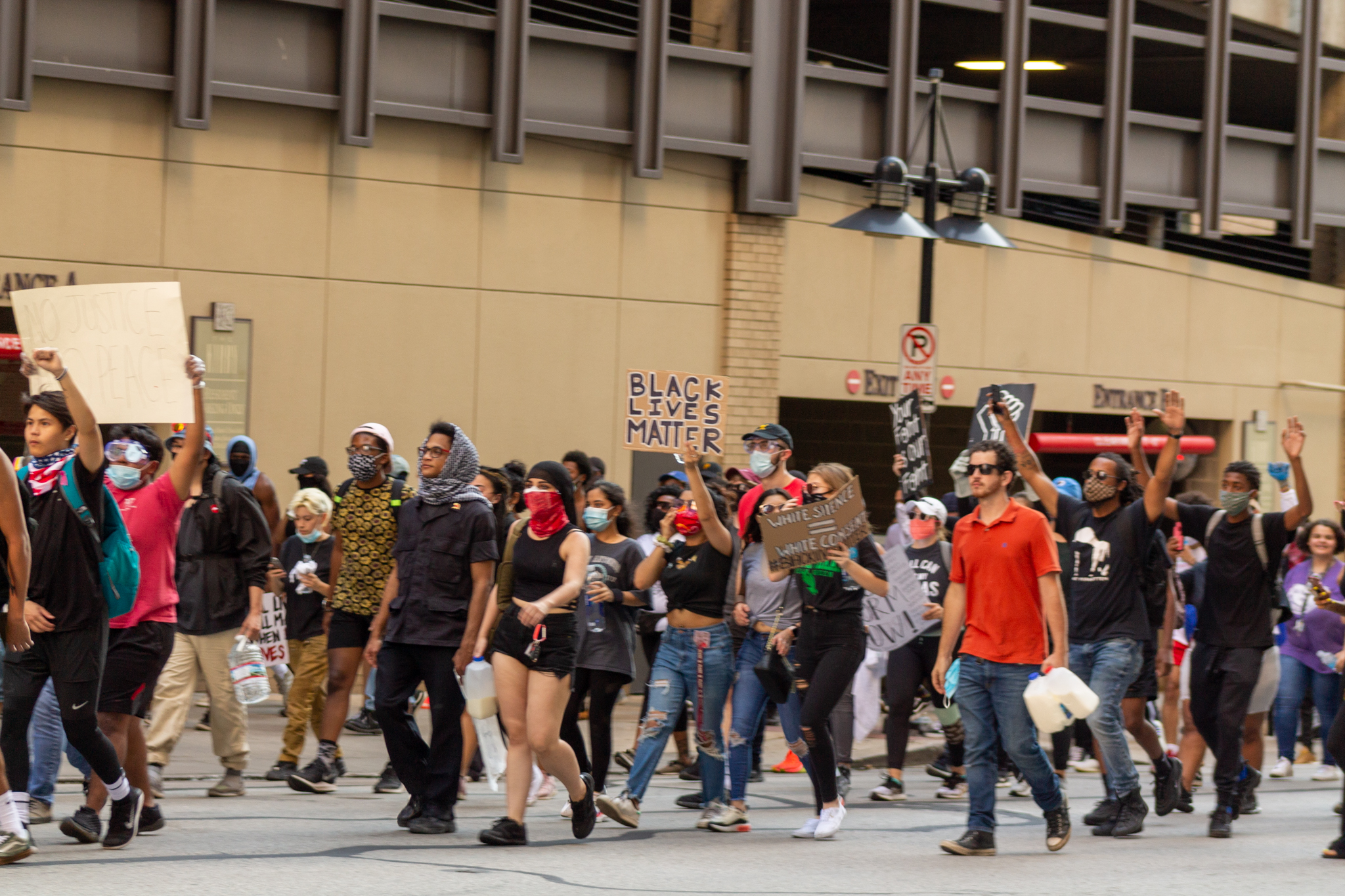
Protesters in Dallas on June 1

Almost a thousand people protested in front of the Dallas Police Headquarters on May 29. The gathering and march organized was by the Next Generation Action Network. After speeches, the protest marched toward downtown Dallas, leaving graffiti in their wake. After crossing the bridge into downtown, the protest split into two groups–one marched toward city hall and was met by a line of riot police, while the other group headed west to the highway. Protesters ran out in front of traffic on Interstate 35, blocking the freeway, but moved on when police caught up. Police kettled, then deployed CS gas and rubber bullets on the city hall group, which had begun throwing water bottles and facing off against the riot line. The two groups reconvened and moved on to march through the bulk of downtown, where demonstrators broke windows, looted businesses, and left a trail of debris behind them to slow police. Several police cruisers were damaged in the Deep Ellum neighborhood and downtown, and some trash cans and a parked police cruiser were set on fire. A man with a machete tried to attack demonstrators, and was beaten in response. Objects used in the fight included a skateboard and several medium-sized rocks. Mayor Eric Johnson said that while the protests were largely respectful, the looting and destruction of property could not be allowed. On the night of June 1, nearly 700 peaceful demonstrators marched onto Margaret Hunt Hill Bridge, where the police deployed teargas and shot protesters with rubber bullets. A police line then advanced behind the protesters, preventing them from leaving. 674 people were charged with misdemeanors by the Dallas Police Department, but charges were ultimately dropped; protesters did not know they were in violation of a law and among the group were community leaders and local politicians.

=== Denton ===
On June 1, thousands of people marched from Denton County Courthouse to protest the murder of George Floyd. A 9 p.m. curfew was set, but hundreds of protesters remained on Denton Square by 10 p.m. A Texas Department of Public Safety state trooper knelt in solidarity with the protesters, and most demonstrators left the square. One arrest was made.

=== Edinburg ===
Over 100 people protested outside of City Hall on May 30, despite the event having been officially postponed beforehand due to safety concerns.

=== El Paso ===
On the night of May 29, the headquarters of the El Paso Police Department on Raynor Street was vandalized with graffiti reading "RIP George Floyd" and "No Justice No Peace". Two days later, on the night of Sunday, May 31, hundreds of protesters gathered in Memorial Park and knelt for an eight-minute moment of silence before marching to the El Paso Police Department. El Paso Police had asked on Twitter for "the public's support in making this a peaceful assembly as a tribute and in honor of Mr. George Floyd", and El Paso native Khalid encouraged the public to stay safe. The event began peacefully, but late at night officers blocked protesters from reaching the police headquarters, angering many protesters. The officers knelt with protesters to show solidarity, but when protesters began throwing water bottles, police ordered the protesters to disperse. Those who resisted the order were met with tear gas and nonlethal rounds before retreating.

=== Fort Worth ===
Community activists marched from the historic Tarrant County Courthouse to the Fort Worth Convention Center without incident on May 29. About 200 protesters gathered downtown on May 30.

=== Flower Mound ===
Dozens of sign-waving protesters gathered at a busy intersection in Flower Mound between June 1 and June 8.

=== Frisco ===
On June 1, hundreds of protesters gathered at the Warren Sports Complex to rally against police brutality, including the city's mayor and police chief.

=== Galveston ===
On May 30, a group of 100 or more protested the murder of George Floyd in Galveston. On June 6, surfers took part in a worldwide Paddle Out, a Hawaiian ritual for celebrating, mourning and remembering a life. Other events took place in France, Senegal, Australia, California, New Jersey and New York.

=== Georgetown ===
On June 3, dozens of people gathered outside the Williamson County Justice Center to protest the murder of George Floyd.

=== Harlingen ===
On June 2, a protest occurred on 3rd and Harrison avenue in Harlingen.

=== Houston ===
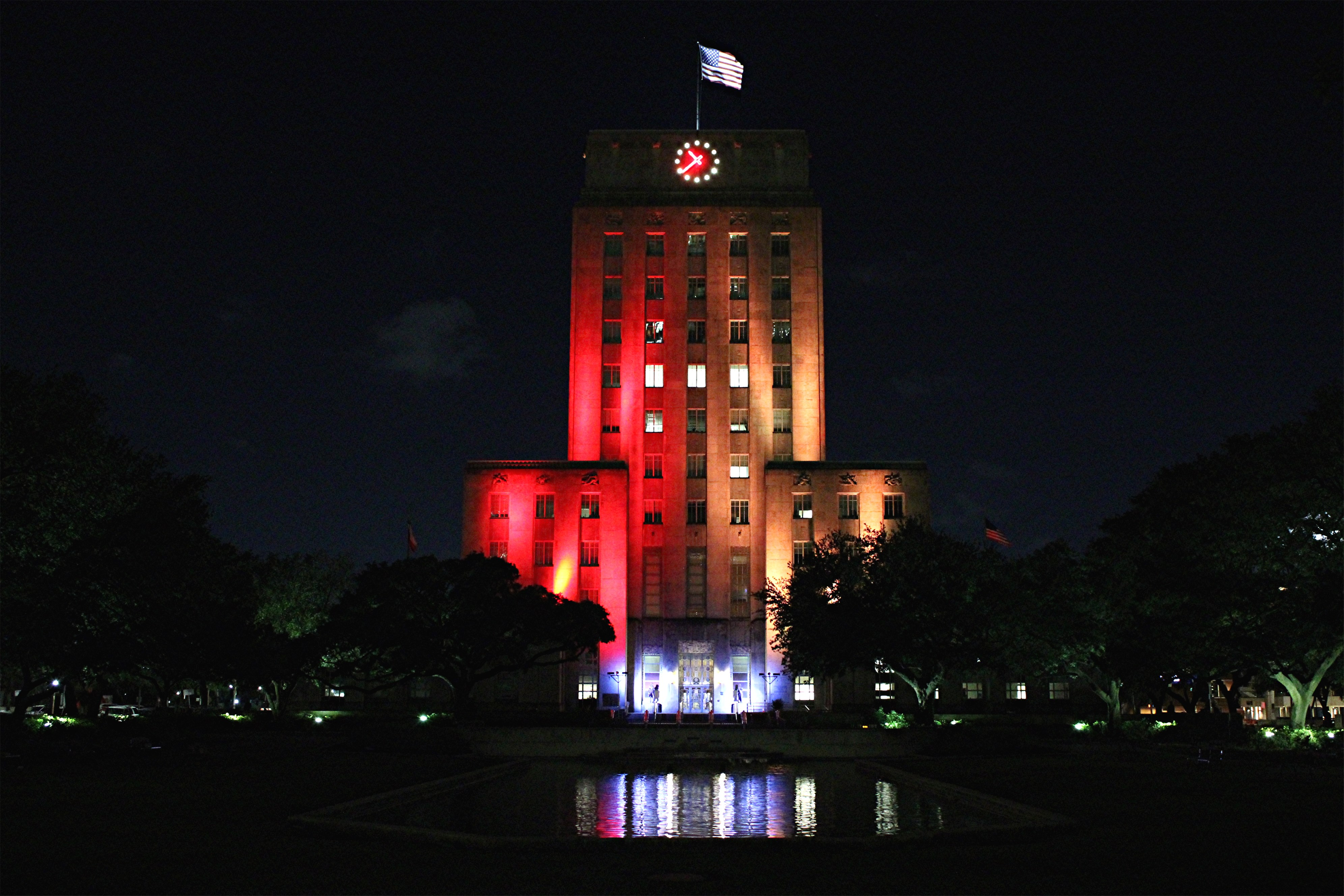
Houston City Hall illuminated in crimson and gold in honor of George Floyd's alma mater Yates High School on June 8

On May 29, large numbers protested in George Floyd's hometown. The demonstration began peacefully as they marched along Interstate 45, but soon turned chaotic as demonstrators blocked the highway, vandalized buildings, and threw objects at police officers. Eight officers were injured, 16 police vehicles were damaged and 137 arrests were made. Mayor Sylvester Turner made calls for unity and peace. Houston police explained that they were investigating a video that appeared to show a female protester being trampled by a police officer on a horse.

On Tuesday, June 2, thousands of people gathered for a march and rally in downtown Houston. Family members of George Floyd joined the march, which one source estimated at 60,000 people.

On June 8, thousands of mourners gathered for a viewing of George Floyd's body at The Fountain of Praise Church. Texas Governor Greg Abbott and Mayor Sylvester Turner and George's younger brother Rodney were among the 10,000 expected to attend the visitation.

=== Irving ===
On June 8, hundreds of protesters marched from the South Irving Library to City Hall in a demonstration against Floyd's murder, during which they took a knee in the middle of the street in Floyd's honor.

=== Keller ===
On Sunday afternoon, June 8, thousands of people of Keller and surrounding communities packed the pavilion at Bear Creek Park for a demonstration in honor of George Floyd. Organizers Charles Banks and Myles Britton and others addressed the crowd, after which around 3,000 protesters, per a Keller Police Department estimate, marched from Bear Creek Park to Keller Town Center.

=== Killeen ===
On May 31, hundreds of people gathered at an empty parking lot to protest police brutality. The event lasted over four hours.

=== Laredo ===
Hundreds of people gathered at the City Hall building on May 30 and June 1 to peacefully protest in wake of the murder of George Floyd and police reform. There was a smaller protest on June 4 to make the public aware of police brutality and systemic racism.

=== Lewisville ===
On June 3, hundreds of protesters attended a rally in Lewisville, which ended after police used tear gas. 9 people were arrested for obstructing a road.

=== Lubbock ===
Nearly 200 people took a stand against racism and police brutality at Tim Cole Memorial Park on May 30.

=== Lufkin ===
On May 31, nearly 100 people demonstrated and marched at the city hall in Lufkin. Protests lasted for about an hour. No injuries or property damage were reported.

=== Mansfield ===
June 5: Hundreds of students from the Mansfield High School participated in a peaceful protest.

=== Marshall ===
On June 9, around 50 people held a peaceful protest outside the Harrison County Courthouse to honor George Floyd and oppose police brutality. The event, which was organized by the group Marshall Against Violence, began with a moment of silence for two minutes and fifty-three seconds, representing the amount of time Floyd was left lying on the ground after being suffocated.

=== McAllen ===
On June 5, protesters marched from Archer Park to city hall in support of Black Lives Matter. One man was arrested after wielding a chainsaw at protesters and yelling racial slurs.

=== McKinney ===
On May 30, more than 200 teens organized a peaceful protest outside McKinney Police Headquarters.

On June 1, a relatively small and peaceful protest occurred in front of the Collin County Courthouse in McKinney.

Protesters gathered in front of the courthouse in McKinney for a prayer vigil event called "A Gathering of Our Collin County Churches" on June 4.

On June 7, a small crowd of protesters gathered to express outrage about the murder of George Floyd and also to bring awareness of the 2015 Texas pool party incident when a McKinney Police Officer was videotaped shoving a 15 year old African-American girl to the ground on June 5, 2015.

=== Midland ===
On May 30, dozens of protesters gathered outside the Midland Park Mall. There was also a group of counter-protesters who verbally quarreled with the protesters. The event continued into the evening, when police deputies on horseback arrived to separate the two groups.

=== New Braunfels ===
On June 2, more than 100 protesters called for change following the murder of George Floyd at an intersection in New Braunfels.

=== Odessa ===
May 30: Hundreds of people marched between 8th street and 2nd street through downtown and protested in front of the police station.

June 3: Protesters gathered at city hall for another march in protest of George Floyd's murder.

=== Palestine ===
On June 1, approximately 50 people held a peaceful protest in Reagan Park. They lit candles and sat on one knee for eight minutes and forty-six seconds.

=== Paris ===
On May 30, around three dozen people formed a peaceful protest at the downtown square; another took place on June 3. On June 18, more protesters demonstrated at the Lamar County Courthouse, where they chanted and sang against systemic racism.

=== Plano ===
On June 2, dozens of protesters, mostly high school students, marched along Parker and Preston Roads to rally against police brutality. On June 3, over 250 people took part in a rally named "Plano Against Police Brutality", as they marched from Haggard Park to the Raymond Robinson Justice Center.

=== Round Rock ===
On May 31, one person stood alone on the corner of Red Bud Lane and Forest Creek Drive with a sign that read "End Systemic Racism." On June 1, 40 demonstrators had gathered there.

=== San Angelo ===
Roughly 300 people marched from The Bosque on the Concho, a public park, along Irving Street to City Hall on May 31.

=== San Antonio ===
On May 30, several thousand people protested peacefully downtown outside the San Antonio Public Safety Headquarters. Members of the This Is Texas Freedom Force, an armed right-wing group, stood guard in front of the Alamo and the adjacent Alamo Cenotaph memorial. The initially peaceful protests later erupted into riots, with police firing rubber bullets and deploying tear gas in order to disperse crowds; several businesses and city sites were damaged, resulting in the arrests of three San Antonio residents and one resident of nearby Uvalde. Three officers were reported injured following the protests.

On June 2, approximately 500 protesters marched to the Bexar County Courthouse and confronted county sheriff Javier Salazar about changing the system. That day's protests were mostly peaceful, but a faceoff with police near Alamo Plaza grew violent. As protesters put their hands up with their backs turned towards the police, officers opened fire with pepper balls, smoke and wooden and rubber balls, reportedly because they were being attacked with glass bottles. San Antonio Mayor Ron Nirenberg denied reports that he approved the use of such projectiles. At least eight arrests were made. The city responded to the protests by placing temporary fencing around the Alamo "as long as events indicate it is needed." They also closed Alamo Plaza to curb unrest and vandalism.

=== Southlake ===
On June 7, hundreds of people turned out for a peaceful march for racial equality in Southlake Town Square. The event was organized by a Carroll High School group called the Progressive Activism Club.

=== Texarkana ===
On Saturday afternoon, May 30, 70 to 100 protesters gathered peacefully at the State Line Post Office to listen to speeches, then marched to downtown before returning northward to a parking lot at State Line and Arkansas Boulevard, where the crowd grew and passing motorists honked in support.

=== Tyler ===
Protests with attendees counting dozens to hundreds occurred regularly in Tyler, a town in East Texas, a region rare for protest, through June 17.

=== University Park ===
On Saturday, June 6 at 10 AM, about 200 people gathered in Snider Plaza to peacefully march to demonstrate their solidarity with the Black Lives Matter movement and to protest the murder of George Floyd. As they gathered the protesters were harassed by an individual who blasted bagpipe music and yelled ‘shame on you.’ The protesters marched down Milton and Airline Avenues to Burleson Park, near the campus of Southern Methodist University. Once gathered at the park in a large circle, the protesters together in silence knelt on one knee for 8 minutes and 46 seconds to mourn the murder of Floyd and many other black men and women. A few pro-life activists were part of the protest, including an African-American man who sang a civil rights anthem, and then was redirected by the crowd to commemorate George Floyd.

=== Vidor ===
A protest was held on June 6 in Vidor, known as a sundown town and a stronghold of the Ku Klux Klan. People gathered outside the Raymond Gould Community Center to unite in protesting George Floyd's murder. Speakers included the head of the Beaumont chapter of the NAACP as well as several Vidorians. Many of those present also acknowledged Vidor's own violent past. One account described "some 150 to 200 people standing in the sun, in the draining humidity and heat of Southeast Texas, ‘to come together in love and unity and to bind together under God,’ as [organizer Maddy] Malone told the crowd. ‘My generation is reaching to break the cycle.’"

=== Waco ===
On June 6, hundreds of protesters gathered in Indian Spring Park to honor the life of George Floyd. Later that evening, they marched to the McLennan County Courthouse, then turned back and kneeled in a moment of silence with their fists raised.

=== Wichita Falls ===
On June 1, hundreds of people protested the murder of George Floyd in Park Central in downtown Wichita Falls. On June 6, a protests called "Stroll for Peace" marched from Spudder Park to the Wichita County Courthouse and back.

== Government response ==
On May 30, Governor Greg Abbott deployed more than 1,500 police officers to Austin, Dallas, Houston and San Antonio.

On the weekend of June 6, Steve Hotze, who runs the political action committee Conservative Republicans of Texas, advised Governor Abbott in a voicemail to order the National Guard "to shoot to kill" rioters.
