= Houston Blue =

2012 non-fiction book by Mitchel P. Roth and Tom Kennedy

Houston Blue: The Story of the Houston Police Department i
- First edition
- Author: Mitchel P. Roth, Tom Kennedy
- Language: English
- Genre: Non-fiction
- Publisher: University of North Texas Press
- Publication date: 2012
- Publication place: United States

Houston Blue: The Story of the Houston Police Department is a 2012 non-fiction book by Mitchel P. Roth and Tom Kennedy, published by the University of North Texas Press, chronicling the history of the Houston Police Department.

Jesús Jesse Esparza, in a journal article, described the book as one of "several seminal works [that] deal with the issue of police misconduct".

== Contents ==
The first author, Roth, is a professor at Sam Houston State University and the second, Kennedy, at one time wrote newspaper articles for the Houston Post. The book was produced in a six year period after the Houston Police Officers' Union hired both authors in 2004. The authors consulted archives as part of their research.

The creators of the book conducted around 100 interviews. The photographs printed in the illustrations are shown without color.

== Reception ==
Brian D. Behnken of Iowa State University, in his review in The Journal of Southern History, criticized the book not having "a clear thesis" and a "lack of a consistent, critical, and analytical focus". He praised the inclusion of women and ethnic minority police officers and "some interesting facts". He particularly criticized how the authors support police unions but oppose other unions. He concluded that "Unfortunately, the book's weaknesses outweigh its strengths."

== See also ==
- Convict Cowboys - Book written by Roth
