= Killing of Daniel Rocha =

2005 police shooting in Austin, Texas

Daniel Rocha (died June 9, 2005) was an 18-year-old man who was shot and killed in southeast Austin, Texas by police officer Julie Schroder, a seven-year veteran of the Austin Police Department, on June 9, 2005. The officer was responding to a report of drug trafficking when she pulled over a dark Chevrolet Suburban carrying Rocha and two others.

== Events ==
According to officers reports, soon after being pulled over near the intersection of South Pleasant Valley Road and Quicksilver Boulevard, a scuffle between Rocha and Officer Julie Schroeder took place.

It was during this time when Schroeder shot Rocha in the back at point blank range. Schroder's testimony was that she used lethal force to protect both officer Sgt. Don Doyle and herself from a taser gun, which, she argued, Rocha could have used. Witnesses at the scene say that he was on the ground face down, unarmed, with Officer Schroeder's knee in his back when he was shot at point blank range.

Austin Police Department Policy provides that cameras in patrol cars be on during traffic stops. Three police cars participated in the stop, yet two of the three available cameras were not on during the incident and the third arrived after Rocha was shot.

Multiple tests were conducted on Rocha to determine whether narcotics were in his blood the night he was killed. Rocha was initially reported drug-free by Travis County Medical Examiner Robert Bayardo. On July 18, 2005, Bayardo reversed this position, stating investigators found traces of marijuana in a "subsequent toxicology screen". This reversal resulted in criticism against the findings from some members of the community.

== Aftermath ==
Julie Schroeder was fired from the Austin Police Department for violating multiple department policies during the incident, including her failure to use in-car recording equipment and improper use and handling of taser weapons. Schroeder's use of deadly force was found to be inappropriate. Stan Knee—chief of the Austin Police Department—stated "this was a deadly force encounter that, in my opinion, was avoidable".

In June 2005, the city of Austin agreed to a $1 million settlement in a lawsuit related to the death of Daniel Rocha.
