= Convict Cowboys =

2016 book by Mitchel P. Roth

- Author: Mitchel P. Roth
- Language: English
- Subject: Texas Prison Rodeo
- Genre: Non-fiction
- Publisher: University of North Texas Press
- Publication date: 2016
- Publication place: United States

Convict Cowboys: The Untold History of the Texas Prison Rodeo is a 2016 book about the Texas Prison Rodeo, written by Mitchel P. Roth and published by the University of North Texas Press.

Roth described the rodeo's popularity as being a part of prison tourism.

== Background ==
Roth conducted interviews, and read archives as part of his research. Some of the archival material included written messages to and from Texas prison administrators George Beto and Pete Coffield, some of which later went on display at the Sam Houston State University George Beto Collection. Robert M. Worley of Lamar University wrote that the correspondence was "[o]ne of the joys of reading" the book.

== Reception ==
Worley wrote that Convict Cowboys is "one of the finest academic books I have read within the past several years, and I am delighted to recommend it to others." Worley praised the even-handed treatment of the subject and "intriguing facts". He added that the book "is likely to resonate with scholars who are both critical and supportive of the mass incarceration movement."

Paul M. Lucko of Murray State University wrote that the book is "nicely written, thoroughly researched, sometimes humorous, and yet serious" and that it has an "entertaining narrative with a penetrating analysis". Lucko concluded that the book "impressively demonstrates" the event's importance in the history of Texas and "preserves" the "legacy" of the event.

== See also ==
- Houston Blue - Book co-written by Roth
