= Ronald C. Green =

15th City Controller of Houston
- In office January 2, 2010 – January 2, 2016
- Mayor: Annise Parker
- Preceded by: Annise Parker
- Succeeded by: Chris Brown

Member of the Houston City Council from the At-large No. 4 District
- In office January 2, 2004 – January 2, 2010
- Preceded by: Michael Berry
- Succeeded by: Clarence Bradford

Personal details
- Born: Houston, Texas
- Party: Democratic
- Education: University of Houston; Texas Southern
- Occupation: Attorney, businessman
- Website: Ronald Green

Ronald Green is a former city controller of Houston and a former member of the Houston City Council.

Ronald C. Green was elected as Houston’s city controller on December 12, 2009 and reelected on November 8, 2011 and again in November 2013 (under the terms of Houston's City Charter, he is term limited after 2015).

A native Houstonian and active community partner, he was first elected to public office as a member of City Council, At-Large Position Four, on December 6, 2003.

A 1988 graduate of the Houston independent school District's High School for Health Professions, Green earned both a Bachelor of Science and a Master of Business Administration from the University of Houston, as well as a law degree from Texas Southern University's Thurgood Marshall School of Law. He is licensed to practice law in the State of Texas, the District of Columbia, the 5th Circuit Court of Appeals and the United States Supreme Court. Green is also a licensed real estate broker.

Green is a founding partner of his own law firm and a member of Alpha Phi Alpha fraternity, 100 Black Men of America, Inc., UH Alumni Organization, UH Black Alumni Association, Thurgood Marshall School of Law Alumni Association, Government Finance Officers Association, National Association of Bond Lawyers, Houston Lawyers Association, and Leadership Houston Class XXIII.

== Personal ==
Green was previously married to Hilary Harmon Green, former Justice of the Peace, Harris County Precinct Seven, Place 1. The couple has a son.
