= Killing of Pamela Turner =

2019 police fatal shooting of a black woman in Baytown, Texas

- Date: May 13, 2019; 7 years ago
- Location: Baytown, Texas, U.S.
- Type: Homicide by shooting
- Deaths: 1
- Accused: Juan Delacruz
- Charges: Aggravated assault by a public servant
- Verdict: Not guilty

On May 13, 2019, Pamela Turner, was shot and killed by a police officer from Baytown, Texas.

The incident occurred at a parking lot of an apartment complex where both Turner and Officer Juan Delacruz (of the Baytown Police Department), were living at the time during an attempt to arrest her for outstanding warrants.

Video footage of the shooting was captured by a bystander and also by the officer's bodycam. Police stated the officer was attempting to arrest her for outstanding warrants when she used his Taser on him; at trial, Texas Ranger Lt. Eric Lopez testified more specifically that she used it on Delacruz’s genitals in the course of resisting arrest. The bodycam showed the struggle between the two prior to the shooting.

Turner's family said that the woman had suffered from schizophrenia and that Delacruz was aware of it; a neighbor also said that Turner was mentally unstable, that Delacruz was aware of it, and that he "had arrested her many times" and had used his Taser on her on the most recent occasion.

During the encounter, Turner said to the officer “You’re actually harassing me” and “I’m actually walking to my house”. Just prior to the shooting, she said “I’m pregnant.” The police department confirmed that Turner was not pregnant.

On September 14, 2020, a Harris County grand jury indicted Delacruz with aggravated assault by a public servant. In 2021, a jury found Delacruz not guilty.

The family retained national civil rights attorneys Benjamin Crump and Devon Jacob. the family sued Baytown and Delacruz in federal court, but on October 11, 2022, judge George C. Hanks Jr. dismissed the case.
