= Elizabeth Watson (police officer) =

Houston police chief

Elizabeth "Betsy" Watson
- Born: 1948-1949
- Other name: "Betsy"
- Police career
- Department: Houston Police Department
- Service years: 1990–1992
- Rank: Police Trainee - 1972; Detective - 1976; Lieutenant - 1981; Captain - 1984; Deputy Chief - 1987; Houston Police Chief - 1990–1992; Austin Police Chief - 1992–1997

Elizabeth "Betsy" Watson was Houston's first female police chief. She served for two years before becoming the police chief in Austin, Texas, and then becoming a law enforcement consultant.

== Early life ==
Watson grew up in Philadelphia but attended high school in Houston, after graduating from college and joining HPD, she met Chase in late 1973 when they were both assigned to the Houston jail, and they began dating the following spring. Since such fraternization was frowned upon, they used a police scuba-diving club as a cover. They married in 1976, the same day she was promoted to Detective.

== Education ==
She received a degree in psychology from Texas Tech University in 1971.

== Career ==
Immediately after graduating, she applied for the Houston Police Department, graduating at the top of her class. She commented that it was tough to be a female officer at the time, and her husband had coaxed her to take, and pass, the Lieutenant's exam after she was forced out of burglary division. To make up for her lack of street experience, she volunteered for night shift duty at some of the city's roughest substations.

As deputy chief, she commanded the West Side Command Station, the first of five planned stations that are the cornerstone of Chief Brown's program to decentralize police work and make it more responsive to the community.

When she was tapped to be the Chief, she would inherit a police force in turmoil or low morale attributed to low pay and a public mistrust of the police due to some recent shootings.

With the swearing in of Sam Nuchia as the chief, Watson was demoted to assistant chief earlier in the year, she took up a position at National Institute of Justice where she worked as a researcher and adviser. The institute compensated the city for salary and benefits until Watson is eligible for retirement in December and She will be commuting between Washington, D.C. and Houston.

A few weeks later, Watson announced that she would be taking the police chief's position at the Austin Police Department, However, she said that she would be unable to take the position until December 5, which is the date that she would complete her 20-year status, and therefore is eligible for retirement pay.

On December 5, 1992, Watson was sworn in as chief of police at Austin, Texas. She would resign in 1997 after a tenure racked with turmoil, police shortages, and other controversies.
