= Sam Nuchia =

American lawyer

Judge, First Court of Appeals
- In office 1997–2008

Houston Chief of Police
- In office January 1992 – January 1997
- Preceded by: Elizabeth "Betsy" Watson
- Succeeded by: Clarence Bradford

Personal details
- Born: Beaumont, Texas
- Party: Republican
- Education: Abilene Christian College, South Texas College of Law
- Occupation: Justice, Police Officer

Sam Nuchia is a professor at the University of Houston–Downtown. He previously served as an appellate judge and served 17 years with the Houston Police Department (HPD) beginning in 1967. Leaving HPD as Deputy Chief to become a prosecutor as an assistant U.S. attorney in the Southern District of Texas, until he was tapped as Chief of Police by Mayor Bob Lanier until leaving under the Lee Brown administration.

== Personal ==
He and his wife Liz are residents of Waller County. They have three grown children and four grand children.

== Education ==
He rose in the ranks to deputy chief while attending college, first at Abilene Christian College and then at South Texas College of Law.

== Career ==
=== Houston Police Department ===
He was credited with a number of positive results under his tenure with the decrease of response times to High Priority calls to 4.4 minutes from a high of 6.1 minutes. A Special Response group was created to handle large crowds and special events, pay increases for senior officers across the ranks. A Woman's Advisory Council was created for female officers to be able to raise and review any concerns, and officers with 20 or more years of experience would be eligible for the Deferred Retirement Option program.

=== Texas Court of Appeals ===
He wrote the opinion that overturned the conviction of Andrea Yates trial where the panel wrote, "Dr Dietz's false testimony could have affected the judgment of the jury. We further conclude that Dr Dietz's false testimony affected the substantial rights of appellant." With that, it a retrial was granted.
