= Austin Police Department =

Law enforcement agency in Austin, Texas, US

- Patch of Austin Police Department

- Badge of Austin Police Department
- Abbreviation: APD

Agency overview
- Preceding agency: Austin City Marshal
- Employees: 2,457 (2026)
- Annual budget: $527,940,862 (2025-26) approved

Jurisdictional structure
- Operations jurisdiction: Austin, Texas, USA
- Map of Austin Police Department's jurisdiction
- Area: 296.2 square miles (767 km^{2})
- Population: 964,243 (2018)
- General nature: Local civilian police

Operational structure
- Headquarters: Austin, Texas
- Officers: ▼1,476 of 1,816 (2025)
- Civilian employees: 675
- Agency executive: Lisa Davis, Chief of police

Facilities
- Patrol vehicles: Ford Explorer, Ford Taurus, Chevrolet Tahoe

Website
- Austin Police

Austin Police Department (APD) is the principal law enforcement agency serving Austin, Texas. As of fiscal year 2026, the agency had an annual budget of $527.9 million and employed around 2,457 personnel, including approximately 1,819 officers. The department also employs 24 K-9 police dogs and 16 horses. As of 2025, Lisa Davis is the current chief of police.

== Early History ==
=== 1840–1862 ===
Prior to the establishment of the Austin Police Department, the city's laws were enforced by a City Marshal, the first of which was elected in 1840. The Marshal's responsibilities included participating in executions and enforcing the city's slave curfew.

=== 1862–1886 ===
City ordinance was drafted in 1862, establishing the Austin Police Department and the office of the Chief of Police. The APD worked alongside the City Marshal to enforce the law for over two decades. The city's mounted police division was created in 1872.

It was not until 1874 that new ordinance established an official city police uniform. Police duties and departmental structure were not legally defined until 1880 and 1883, respectively.

Austin experienced its first recorded serial killer between 1884 and 1885, known as the "Servant Girl Annihilator" or "Midnight Assassin," who killed at least eight people, mostly young women and girls. Contemporary journalism criticized the APD for its inefficacy in solving these murders. APD was never able to identify the killer.

=== 1886–1924 ===
New ordinances further developed expectations of the police in 1886, as well as effectively merging the offices of Chief of Police and City Marshal. The two titles were used interchangeably for a short period of time.

In 1921, new ordinance was written to establish traffic laws, as automobiles began to proliferate. The APD was given the responsibility of enforcing these laws.

=== 1924–2000 ===
The Marshal system was officially dissolved in 1924. The office of the Chief of Police was also changed from an elected position to one appointed by the mayor.

The first female police officer in Austin, Maybelle Stout, joined the department in 1950. The city's first female lieutenant, Bobby Owens, was appointed in 1989. The first female chief of the APD, Elizabeth Watson, took the job in 1992.

== Recent History ==
=== Discrimination and bias ===
In 2018, Austin's Office of Police Oversight received a complaint of racially biased harassment from an officer. The office investigated Officer Michael Hewitt, whose body camera footage showed the officer ticketing a Black man for loitering in the parking lot of a 7-Eleven, while ignoring similar behavior from a white driver. Hewitt was not disciplined as a result of the office's investigation.

The Austin Police Association, Austin's police union, referenced the incident in a 2020 claim that the oversight office violated the union's labor contract with the city. The Austin-American Statesman reported that the APA claimed that the oversight office overstepped by "investigating citizens' complaints, contacting witnesses and demanding that internal affairs detectives ask certain questions during officer interviews."

Then-City Council Member Greg Casar accused the APA of using legal loopholes to "undermine basic oversight and accountability."

=== Budget cuts ===
In August 2020, the Austin City Council voted unanimously to reduce the department's budget of $434 million by approximately $150 million. Then councilman Greg Casar introduced a three-part plan which called for an immediate reallocation of $21.5 million of the department's budget to social services. Other budget reduction measures included eliminating 150 vacant officer positions, and declining to add 30 new officer positions that had been budgeted as part of a broader staffing plan. The Texas Tribune reported the cuts to be "among the largest percentage decreases (in budget) in the nation this year." In the same year, Austin city manager Spencer Cronk placed a moratorium on Austin Police Department cadet classes to allow for an audit of the training academy materials and curriculum.

In 2021, 210 Austin police officers left the department, which was more than the two previous years combined.

The City of Austin's approved 2024-25 budget gives insight into the direction of Austin’s police spending. The Austin Police Department’s 2024-25 approved budget is $496,601,181 and the 2025-26 planned budget is $503,699,330. The APD Amended annual budget for 2020-21 was $309,706,558.

=== No longer responding to "non-emergencies" ===
In October 2021, chief Joseph Chacon announced officers would no longer respond to non-emergency calls due to severe staffing shortages and at the recommendation of the Reimagining Public Safety Task Force. The policy, which took effect October 1, 2021, applies to burglaries no longer in progress, vehicle thefts, and vehicle collisions without injuries. Those who are seeking to make a report are fielded to 311 or encouraged to fill out a report on iReportAustin.com.

=== Systemic mishandling of sexual assault cases ===
In 2018, a Texas Department of Public Safety audit found that Austin police detectives often improperly classified their closed cases as "cleared" when that category didn't apply. The audit prompted subsequent re-trainings, after which uses of the classification for sexual assault cases trended downward.

For years, according to the Austin-American Statesman, sexual assault victims' advocates have criticized the Travis County district attorney's office for prosecuting only a small number of the hundreds of sexual assault cases it receives each year. The issue emerged as a major theme in the 2020 campaign for district attorney. In 2022, the city of Austin reportedly paid more than $825,000 to settle lawsuits from more than a dozen women who said APD did not take seriously their complaints of sexual assault.

An analysis from the Washington, D.C.-based Police Executive Research Forum, which reportedly cost the city $950,000, found that the APD Sex Crimes Unit does not require detectives to respond to the scene of the assault or the hospital in most cases, and from 2013 to 2020, detectives only did so 17% of the time. According to the report, detectives' interviews with victims, suspects, and witnesses are often delayed or fail to occur. Of the cases that took place during the seven-year period, 65% were not discussed with a prosecutor.

=== Unsealed personnel and disciplinary files ===
In May 2023, the city of Austin voted in favor of the Austin Police Oversight Act, known locally as "Prop A." Among other things, the Act required the city to unseal previously confidential APD records known as "G files," making them available to the public through the state's Public Information Act. These records contained unsubstantiated misconduct complaints against active duty police officers, as well as Internal Affairs investigation and disciplinary records, where applicable.

The G files where reportedly not made accessible to the public until September 2024, after the non-profit Equity Action filed a lawsuit in December 2023, demanding immediate implementation of all measures in the APOA. After multiple court proceedings a judicial ruling confirmed that keeping the files sealed was unlawful.

According to KXAN-TV, however, these records were not made freely available, requiring the individual or entity who filed the request to pay a fee to allegedly cover the labor of city records workers to compile the reports. KXAN reported that the city quoted an invoice for the files of all 1,510 then-active APD officers totaling $27,180.

In 2025, Republican Texas state Senator Phil King and state House Representative Cole Hefner brought Senate Bill 781 and House Bill 2486, respectively, before their chambers of the Texas legislature. Both of these bills would require police departments in Texas to maintain personnel records that would contain "any letter, memorandum, or document relating to alleged misconduct by the license holder for which the agency determines there is insufficient evidence to sustain the charge of misconduct." CBS Austin reported that this legislation seemed to allow for APD to potentially bypass the APOA and resume keeping confidential Internal Affairs and disciplinary records. State Senator Borris Miles from Houston, in a debate with Senator King on the chamber floor, stated that the result, if not the intent, of SB781 was to re-create confidential police personnel files that could not be subjected to public scrutiny. SB781 was recorded as passed in the Senate on May 19, 2025, but has yet to move to the House. HB2486 was marked as postponed in the House on May 13, 2025.

=== Austin Police Association contract ===
In October 2024, police oversight advocacy group Equity Action requested intervention from the district court to block the approval of a new long-term contract with the Austin Police Association on the grounds that the contract contained language that would potentially allow the dismantling of Austin's civilian police oversight system, directly interfering with the Austin Police Oversight Act passed by popular vote in 2023. According to Equity Action, the new contract could allow the city to maintain sealed disciplinary records--referred to as the "G file"--of APD officers, that it would limit the Office of Police Oversight’s ability to conduct independent investigations into police misconduct, and it would allow the APA to undermine the Oversight Act by filing contract grievances over conflicts between the Oversight Act and the contract itself.

APA President Michael Bullock claimed that the new contract could not grant the ability to seal the G file, but also expressed the opinion that such sealed files are not unlawful. Austin City Council member Chito Vela cited a "verbal agreement" between the city's labor relations team and the APA that the contract would not be used to reseal the G file.

According to KXAN-TV, however: "For months, the g-file remained a sticking point during these negotiations [regarding the APA contract]." An unnamed APA representative was previously reported as saying that APA would not agree to a contract that allows the release of G file contents. Bullock also reportedly claimed that state law prohibits the release of g-file contents, while an unnamed City spokesperson stated “where there is a conflict between state law and a local law, as the presentation [presented in court] reiterates, state law provides a mechanism for local entities to override such law. That mechanism is a negotiated meet and confer agreement.”

The proposed APA contract also required a $218 million commitment from the city over the contract's lifetime, which sparked concerns about potential tax increases. While city staff claimed that approval of the contract would not result in a severe budget deficit, local policy analyst Julio Gonzalez Altamirano stated that the city staff's projections were "unreasonable and faulty."

=== Automated license plate reader program ===
In June 2025, The Austin Chronicle reported that up to 20% of searches performed by officers during the pilot period of the APD's automated license plate reader program were performed without a clearly documented reason or case number attached to the search. Later the same month, following criticism from city residents and council members, the Austin City Council declined to vote on renewing the program, allowing the city's contract with Flock Safety to expire at the end of the month.

=== Involvement with ICE ===
In April 2026, The Austin Current reported a reversal in APD policy for handling federal administrative warrants. The initial change in verbiage was intended to give officers more discretion in the choice to contact immigration services when encountering these non-judicial warrants, stating that an officer "may, but is not required to" contact the ICE Law Enforcement Service Center. Within a month of the change, Texas Governor Greg Abbott's office sent a letter to Austin city Mayor Kirk Watson demanding that the original language of the policy be restored, which stated that an officer "should" contact ICE. According to the Austin Current, if city leadership didn't comply with the Governor's instructions, the state would withhold millions of dollars in public safety grants. Despite local pushback, Mayor Watson acquiesced to the Governor's orders and reversed the policy change, forcing increased future cooperation between APD and ICE.

== Police violence ==
=== Lieutenant Dustin Paul Lee charged with child sexual assault ===
In 2019, then 47-year-old APD Lieutenant Dustin Paul Lee was arrested on a charge of sexual assault of a child. Lee was booked into Williamson County Jail with bail set at $150,000. According to the affidavit, a 16-year-old girl claimed Lee had assaulted her on a weekly basis for years. APD said in a public statement that Lee was placed on restricted duty following the arrest.

Lee pled guilty to sexually assaulting a child in 2022. He received deferred adjudication and 10 years probation and community supervision.

According to KVUE, Lee was known to have a disciplinary record with the APD, having been previously fired in 2008 for making inappropriate sexual comments to a female coworker. Lee was reinstated in 2009 with a demotion in rank.

=== Shooting of Michael Ramos by Officer Christopher Taylor ===
==== The shooting ====
On April 24, 2020, Officer Christopher Taylor, and other officers, were dispatched to a Southeast Side apartment complex for a report of drug dealing. The caller told dispatchers they believed the man, later identified as 42-year-old Michael Ramos, had a firearm. Responding officers stated Ramos ignored commands and a bean bag projectile before he got into his car and attempted to flee. Taylor's attorneys say he opened fire on Ramos believing other officers were in the path of the vehicle. Ramos was struck by the gunfire and later pronounced deceased. Ramos was unarmed.

==== Murder trial ====
Travis County district attorney Jose Garza brought the shooting before a grand jury in 2021 and a grand jury returned a true bill of indictment against Taylor for murder. In May 2023, a judge declared a mistrial in Taylor's case following issues selecting a jury. The judge reset the trial for October 2023. Taylor is reportedly the first officer to be charged with murder for on-duty conduct. Taylor was indicted for the fatal on-duty shooting of 46-year-old neuroscientist Mauris DeSilva while DeSilva was having a mental health crisis. Travis County prosecutors dropped the murder charge against Taylor related to the fatal shooting of Michael Ramos, on February 21, instead pursuing a charge of deadly conduct. A jury in Travis County found Taylor guilty of deadly conduct on October 5, 2024. He was later sentenced to 2 years in prison.

=== 2020 Protests ===
Ramos' death, and the murder of George Floyd in Minneapolis one month later, prompted weeks of protests in Austin throughout the summer of 2020. During the protests, at least three demonstrators were severely injured by officers deploying less-lethal munitions, with reports of as many as three dozen reporting to hospitals with injuries allegedly sustained due to police action.

==== Improper use of "less-lethal" weaponry ====
At a May 31 protest outside APD headquarters on 8th street, an officer allegedly shot Anthony Evans with a lead-pellet-filled "bean bag" round, reportedly shattering Evans' jaw. Brad Levi Ayala and Nikki Underwood were shot with similar rounds the day prior, with lead pellets reportedly embedded into their bodies. Street medic Maredith Drake was allegedly shot in the hands by officers with less-lethal rounds while she was trying to carry an injured protestor to get medical assistance. Drake was reportedly wearing clothing emblazoned with red crosses, meant to identify her as a medic. Justin Howell, the injured protestor whom Drake attempted to assist, was put in critical condition due to being struck with a bean bag round.

Despite criticism of the tactic by the Austin Police Association's then-president Ken Casaday, Austin police chief Brian Manley notably refused to order APD officers to stop intentionally firing at protesters' heads when deploying less-lethal munitions.

In August, a protester who attempted to record police conduct was pushed and then thrown to the ground by APD officers, reportedly suffering head trauma from the assault.

==== Aftermath ====
Twenty-one APD officers were later indicted for actions taken during the 2020 protests, fifteen of which faced assault charges. The city of Austin was reported to have paid out over $17 million in lawsuits related to APD shootings of protesters.

Protestors who received settlements from the city include:

- Maredith Drake - street medic shot while tending Justin Howell
- Anthony Evans - suffered a shattered jaw from being shot with a bean bag round
- Justin Howell - left in critical condition due to being shot with a bean bag round

An attorney representing some of the protesters said of the shootings: "That requires real reflection on the part of the city's leaders and the strength to hold its officers responsible for wrongdoing. Until and unless APD leadership actually disciplines the officers that shot people who were simply protesting police violence, it is inevitable that more innocent people will be shot by APD officers. That APD is not yet willing to issue such discipline is disappointing to say the least."

=== Shooting of Alexander Gonzales ===
==== The shooting ====
In January 2021, off-duty Officer Gabriel Gutierrez and Alexander Gonzales engaged in a "road rage incident" according to the Austin Chronicle. Gutierrez claimed that Gonzales aimed a firearm at the off-duty officer from inside Gonzales' vehicle. Gutierrez responded by firing multiple shots into the other vehicle, striking Gonzales non-fatally in the head. Jessica Arellano, Gonzales' girlfriend, who was also in the vehicle, was struck in the back, shoulder, and arm.

On-duty officer Luis Serrato responded to a 911 call made by Gutierrez after the shooting, and fired 10 shots at Gonzales, killing him. Serrato later testified that Gutierrez had instructed him that Gonzales was armed, which he believed justified lethal force. Serrato also testified that he was unaware that Gonzales' and Arellano's infant son was in the backseat of the vehicle.

==== Release of body camera footage ====
KXAN News reported that APD publicly released body cam footage from the shooting 113 days after the incident, failing to meet the 60-day deadline according to city policy. APD officials cited the February winter storm for the delay. The Gonzales family's attorney said in a statement that "[The winter storm] doesn’t necessarily account for the entire delay.” Attorneys for Officer Serrato, Ken Ervin and Doug O’Connell, issued an open letter to APD Interim Chief Joseph Chacon and Travis County District Attorney José Garza, asking them not to release the body and dash cam footage of the Gonzales shooting Wednesday. “Releasing video footage under the guise of transparency, in this manner and at this time, is completely counterproductive to the overriding goal of maintaining fairness in our justice system and ensuring public confidence that the system worked properly. There is an appropriate time for evidence to be released, but tomorrow is not that time. You are damaging the legal process.”

==== Indictment ====
A 2022 grand jury declined to indict either Gutierrez or Serrato on criminal charges related to the shooting. In 2023, then Austin police chief Joseph Chacon declined to discipline either officer as well.

==== Wrongful death lawsuit ====
In June 2025, Alexander Gonzales, Sr. and Elizabeth Gonzales brought a civil suit against Officer Gabriel Gutierrez for the wrongful death of their son, Alexander Gonzales, who was shot "following a road rage incident" in January 2021. The suit also names the city of Austin as a defendant for the alleged inadequate investigation into the death conducted by the APD.

Jessica Arellano, Gonzales' girlfriend, who was in the car with Gonzales at the time of the shooting and was also injured by Gutierrez, was initially a co-plaintiff in the suit. Arellano's suit was settled out of court in May of 2025. The details of the settlement have not been disclosed to the public.

U.S. District Judge Robert Pitman made the decision to allow the plaintiffs to take the city of Austin to court in light of external reports which highlighted deficiencies within the APD's internal misconduct investigative process. Pitman wrote that the plaintiffs presented "sufficient evidence to show that the city had a practice of permitting excessive force by under-investigating and under-disciplining the majority of officers who engaged in excessive force." Jury selection for the civil trial began in late June.

=== Assault of homeless person by Officers Rodriguez and Escamilla ===
In October 2021, Simone Griffith was thrown against the wall of an east Austin building, kneed in the side, and then punched eight times in an arrest attempt by two officers, who have yet to be identified by APD, on the charge of trespassing and resisting arrest. Griffith had been sleeping in front of a strip mall when the officers responded to a 911 call regarding her presence. APD stated that the officers involved did not call the Department's Crisis Intervention Team, a specially trained unit for handling mental health crises. An APD spokesperson reportedly said "It is generally not feasible to delay enforcement action in situations where a property owner requires a trespasser to be removed from the property owner's private property."

Upon internally reviewing the incident, APD determined that the use of force complied with the law and its own policies. The Travis County Attorney's Office dropped both charges against Griffith in November 2021.KXAN-TV released bystander video footage of the assault in January 2022. APD refused to release police body camera footage of the arrest or the report on the findings of the internal investigation to KXAN, stating that the incident was being re-reviewed by the Travis County District Attorney's Office.

In 2022, Griffith pressed charges against the officers--who were only identified by the surnames Rodriguez and Escamilla--and the city of Austin in federal court on the grounds that her fourth and fourteenth amendment rights--the right to freedom from cruel and unusual punishment and the right to fair and equal treatment, respectively--were violated. Griffith's attorney, Rebecca Webber, in response to APD's decision, said that "if that beating complies with their policies, their policies are unconstitutional and need to be changed."

Webber, who served on the city's Public Safety Commission, asserted in the lawsuit that Austin Police Academy training was a root cause of the assault: that cadets "were trained to treat unhoused people like vermin." The lawsuit referenced a 2018 Austin-American Statesman article in which a former cadet stated that instructors told cadets they would punch them in the face if they said they wanted to be officers to help people.

=== Domestic assault by chief data officer Jonathan Kringen ===
In 2023, Jonathan Kringen, APD's chief data officer and public face of the partnership between APD and the Department of Public Safety, was arrested on charges of domestic violence. Kringen was subsequently fired from his position with the APD. In 2024, Kringen appealed the termination with the Municipal Civil Service Commission, alleging wrongful termination. Kringen's appeal was denied by the MCSC.

=== Domestic violence by Officer Joshua Lugo ===
In 2024, Officer Joshua Lugo was arrested by New Braunfels police and charged with assault causing bodily injury to a family member. Lugo was later released on bail and placed on restricted duty with pay by the APD.

An APD memorandum filed on March 26, 2025 by police chief Lisa Davis stated that Lugo was placed on "indefinite suspension." The memorandum provides partially-redacted details of the alleged offense, with interview excerpts from both Lugo and the alleged victim, whose name is also redacted.

=== Multiple assaults by Corporal Brian Yarger ===
On June 2, 2024, while Yarger and other officers conducted a traffic stop in east Austin, a crowd gathered. Body camera footage showed that Yarger attempted to disperse the crowd by shouting and shoving bystanders. Yarger claimed in a report that one man reached for Yarger's holster, at which point he punched the man three times in the solar plexus before pinning him to the ground. APD's Force Review Unit determined that Yarger's claims did not align with the footage.

On July 24, 2024, Yarger responded to what was described as a "verbal altercation between two men on Trinity Street. Body camera footage showed Yarger arguing with one of the individuals before shooting him twice with a stun gun. Yarger then attempted to grab the second individual, who resisted. Yarger performed a leg-sweep takedown on the second individual, reportedly delivering a palm heel strike to the back of the man's head, kneeing him in the side, and then kneeling on his head and neck area to pin him to the ground.

KVUE reported that Yarger had been formally reprimanded on more than one occasion for various breaches of policy. One official document records and incident in 2019, during which Yarger made unprofessional comments while interfacing with the public. Another document records Yarger's suspension in late 2022 after an Internal Affairs investigation revealed that Yarger had created group text threads in order to exclude and/or "shit-talk" subordinate officers whom Yarger disliked, according to Yarger's own words.

Yarger resigned in lieu of a disciplinary hearing and dismissal, and later entered a guilty plea for assault charges related to the 2024 incidents. Yarger received a 12-month deferred adjudication probation sentence, and was required to permanently surrender his Texas Commission on Law Enforcement (TCOLE) peace officer license.

=== Disproportionate shootings of Latino Men ===
In May 2026, Decibel, a community journalism project with Austin PBS, reported on a new dashboard created by the Austin Police Oversight office. The dashboard featured data collected by APO over the past eight years, which showed, among other things, that Latinos were more likely to be injured or killed in officer-involved shootings in the city. According to Decibel, of the 60 OIS incidents reported between 2018 and 2025, 46% involved Latino men, while 70% involved white officers with less than four years of experience. Latinos make up only about 32% of the city's population.

== Organization ==
=== Administrative structure ===
==== Executive ====
The Office of the Chief of Police is the highest leadership position in the Austin Police Department. The office is currently occupied by Lisa Davis. Directly reporting to the chief is the Chief of Staff, who oversees all police operations across the department's divisions. The next layer in the hierarchy currently consists of five Assistant Chiefs who manage the five bureaus of the APD, with each bureau divided into two divisions, and each division headed by a commander.

==== Development and Engagement Bureau ====
The Assistant Chief in charge of Development and Engagement's responsibilities are divided into two broad divisions: APD's training academy and recruiting initiatives, as well as community policing projects.

==== Tactical/Special Operations Bureau ====
The Assistant Chief in charge of Tactical and Special Operations is responsible for a wide array of criminal investigations and special response teams, divided into two broad divisions: Tactical Investigations, and Special Operations.

The fields under the purview of the Tactical Investigations division include:

- Gangs and Major Crimes
- Human Trafficking and Vice
- Child Exploitation
- Narcotics
- Austin Regional Intelligence Center (ARIC)
- Crisis Intervention
- Focused Deterrence

The fields under the purview of the Special Operations division include:

- Airport
- SWAT
- Bomb Squad
- Air Operations
- Patrol K-9
- Lake Patrol
- Hostage Negotiations

==== Investigations Bureau ====
The Assistant Chief in charge of Investigations is responsible for the bulk of criminal investigations in the city of Austin. These investigations are divided into two broad divisions: Investigations, and Special Victims Investigations.

The fields under the purview of the Investigations division include:

- Homicide
- Aggravated Assault
- Robbery
- Violent Crime Task Force
- Tactical Intelligence
- Special Investigations
- Burglary
- Cold Case and Missing Persons
- Region Detectives
- Crime Gun Intelligence Unit (CGIU)
- Auto Theft

The fields under the purview of the Special Victims Investigations division include:

- Sex Crimes
- Special Victims Intervention Unit/Domestic Violence
- Child Abuse
- Sex Offender Apprehension and Registration (SOAR)
- Digital Forensics
- Animal Cruelty
- Arrest Review
- Evidence Integrity.

==== Administrative Bureau ====
The Assistant Chief in charge of Administrative's responsibilities are divided into two divisions: Special Events, and Fleet/Tech/Real Time Crime Center.

The fields under the purview of the Special Events division include:

- Special Events
- Reserve Officers
- Emergency Management
- Executive Protection Unit
- Vehicular Homicide
- Commercial Vehicle Enforcement
- Motors Sergeants and Auxiliary
- Wrecker Enforcement
- Impaired Driving and Vehicle Abatement
- Highway Enforcement Investigations

The fields under the purview of the Fleet, Tech, and RTCC division include:

- APD Vehicle Fleet
- Real Time Crime Center (RTCC)
- Police Technology

==== Patrol Bureau ====
The Assistant Chief in charge of Patrols is responsible for all patrol units and operations in the city. The Patrol Bureau's command structure differs slightly from the other bureaus, as responsibilities are divided between nine commanders, each in charge of one of the nine patrol divisions, or "area commands," in Austin.

See "Patrol Divisions" for a full list of APD area commands.

=== Professional Standards Command ===
The Professional Standards Command sits outside the main command structure of the APD, reporting directly to the Chief of Staff. The PSC contains Internal Affairs, Risk Management, and the Force Review Unit.

=== Civilian Leadership ===
==== Assistant Director ====
The Assistant Director is a civilian position that oversees much of the administrative work of the APD. The office of the Assistant Director handles financial services, grants and government affairs, human resources, and police records.

==== Strategic Initiatives ====
The Chief of Strategic Initiatives engages in long-term planning for the direction of the department, as well as collecting, processing, and providing data and analytics relevant to the work of the police in Austin.

=== Specialized units ===
- APD 219 (Communication Supervisor Line for Austin 311)
- Aggravated Assault Unit
- Air Support Unit (Air One)
- Auto Theft Interdiction Unit
- Chaplain
- Child Abuse Unit
- Cold Case Unit
- Command/Executive Staff (Chief police, and other department leaders)
- Counter Assault Strike Team (CAST)
- Crime Scene Unit (CSU)
- Court Services
- Decentralized Investigations
- Digital Forensics Unit (DFU)
- Executive Protection Unit (EP)
- Explosive Ordnance Disposal (EOD)
- Family Violence Protection Team
- Financial Crimes Unit (FCU)
- HALO- High Activity Location Observation (Cameras in the street)
- Homicide
- Honor Guard
- Human Trafficking Unit
- Intelligence
- Internal Affairs (IA)
- K9 Unit
- Mounted Patrol- Horse Unit
- Peer Support Unit
- Public Information Office
- Recruiting
- Risk Management Unit
- Robbery Unit
- Sex Crimes Unit
- Special Events Unit (SEU)
- Special Investigations Unit (SI)
- Special Weapons & Tactics (SWAT)
- Training Academy
- Vehicular Homicide Unit
- Victim Services Unit/Counselors (VSU)

=== Patrol divisions ===
- Downtown Area Command (DTAC)
- Northeast Area Command
- Northwest Area Command
- North Central Area Command
- Central East Area Command
- Central West Area Command
- Southeast Area Command
- Southwest Area Command
- South Central Area Command

=== Ranks ===
Rank	Chief of Police	Chief of Staff	Assistant Chief	Commander	Lieutenant	Sergeant (10 years seniority)	Sergeant	Corporal/ Detective	Senior Police Officer	Police Officer	Recruit
Insignia									No insignia		

== Fallen officers ==
Since the establishment of the Austin Police Department, twenty-four officers have died in the line of duty.

== Gallery ==
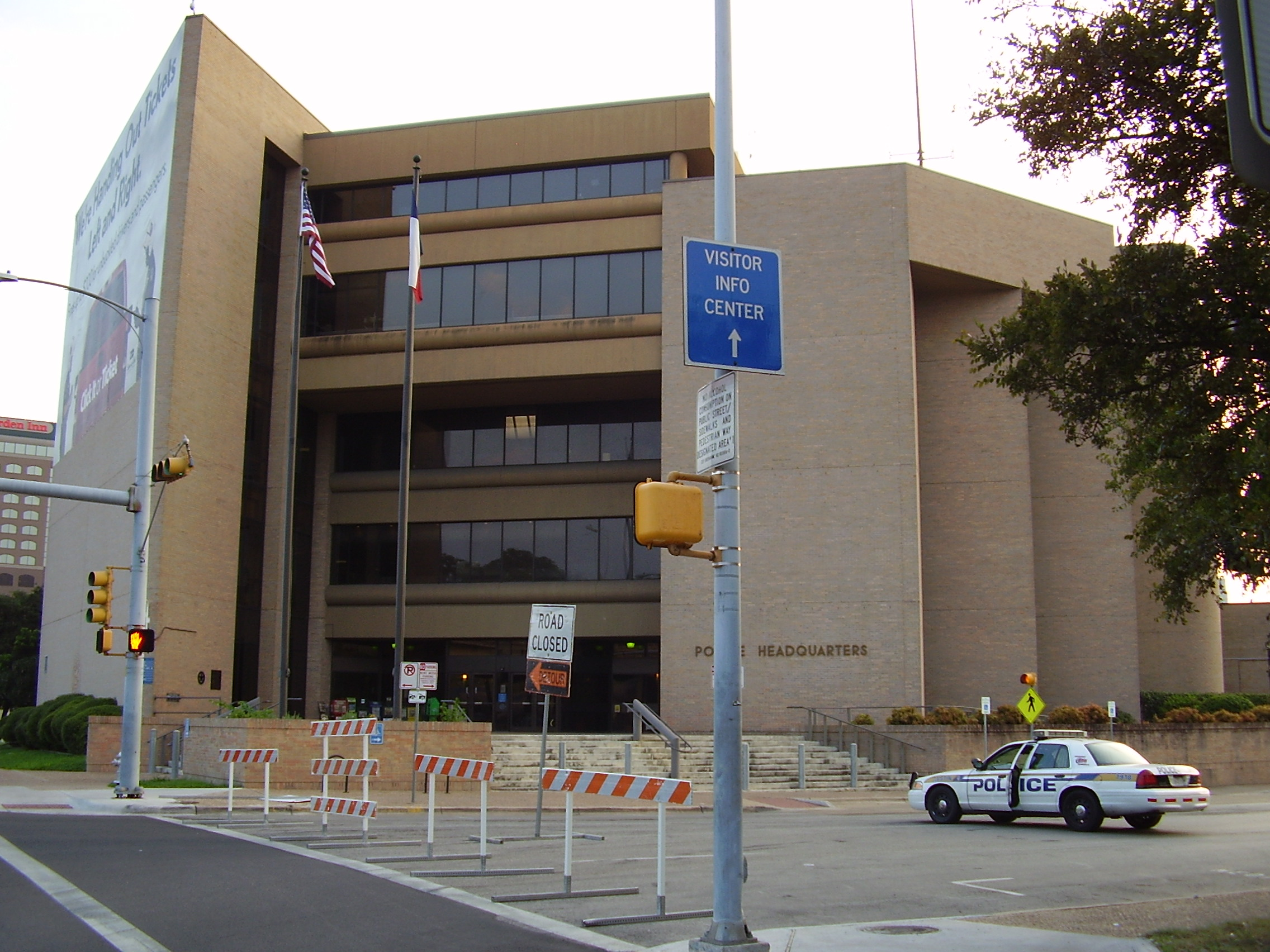
Austin Police Headquarters

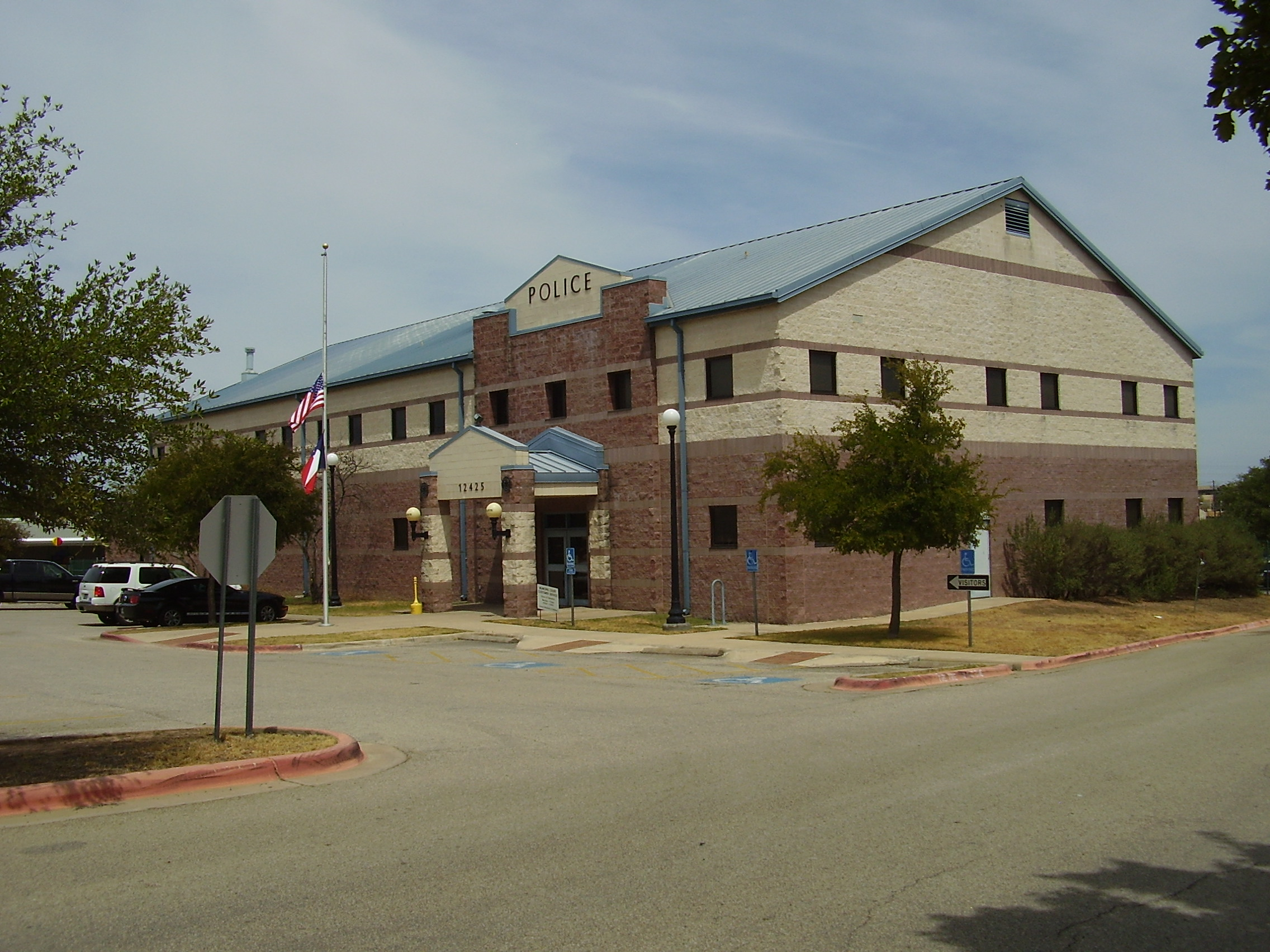
Jaime Padron North Substation

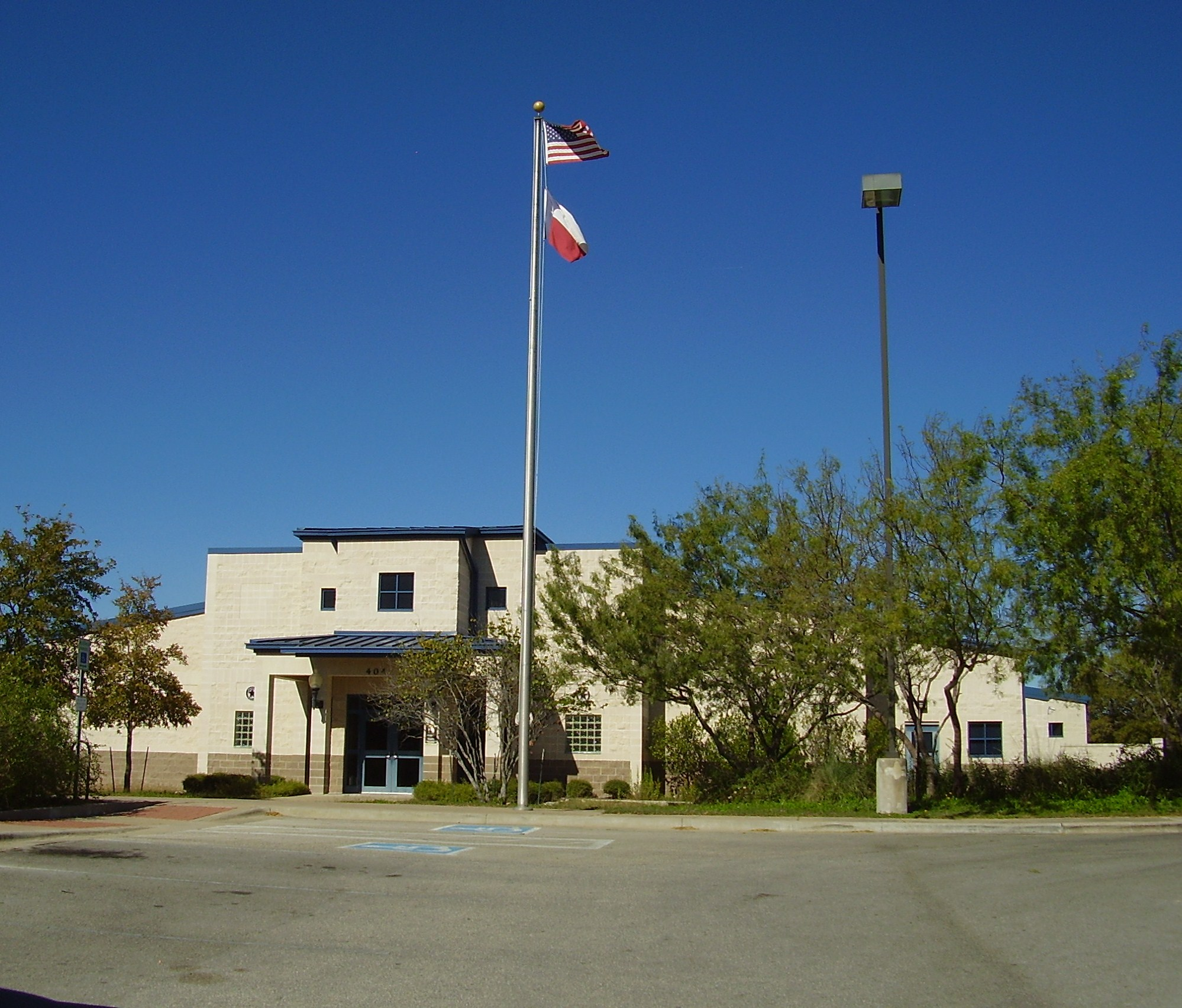
Clinton Warren Hunter Austin Police South Substation

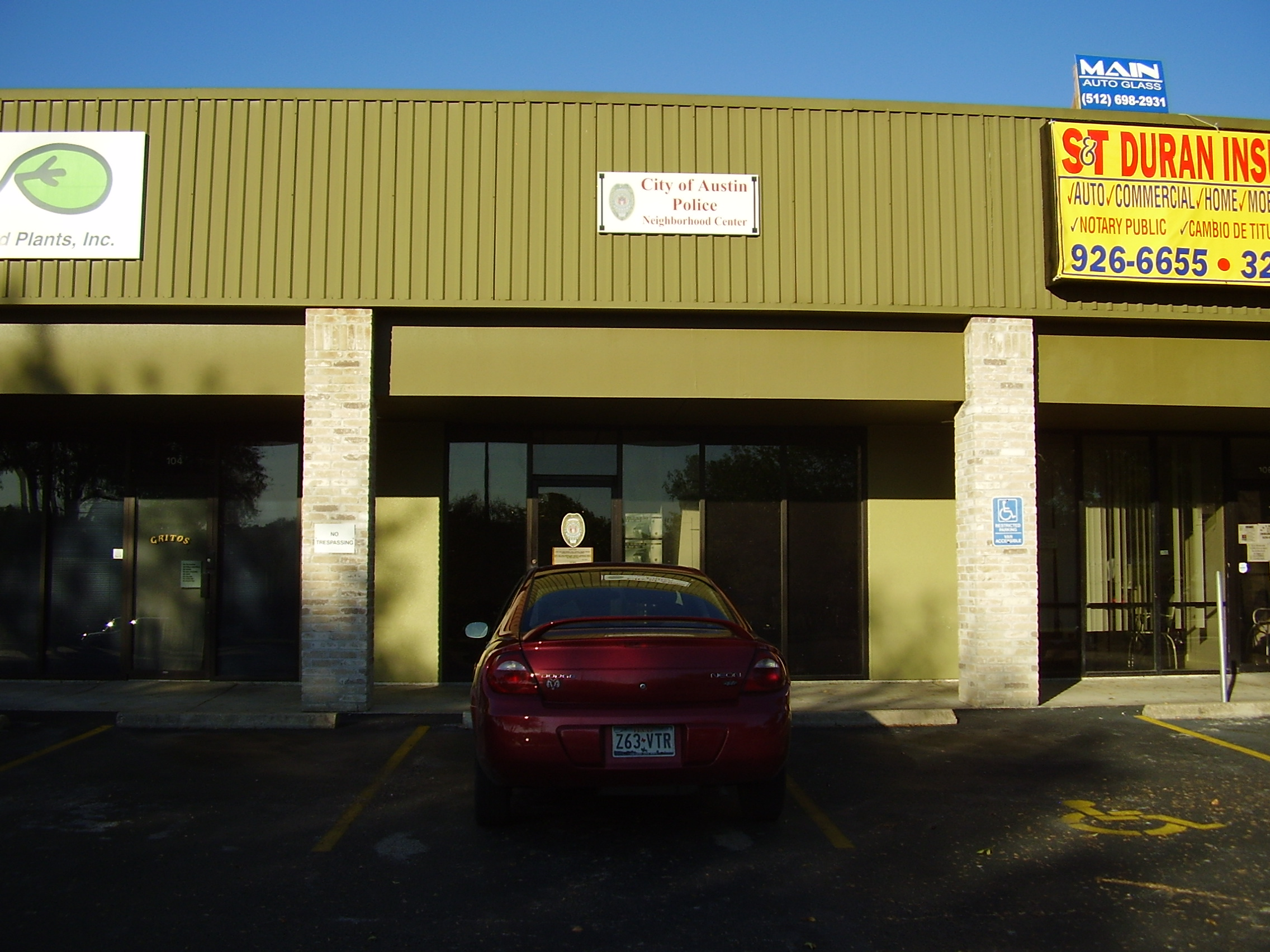
Loyola Neighborhood Center

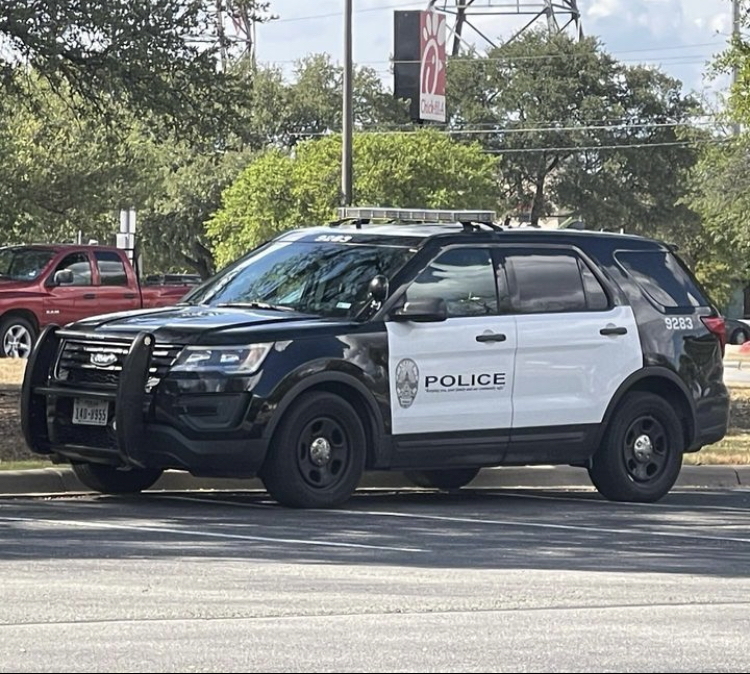
Police car

== See also ==
- List of law enforcement agencies in Texas
