= Clarence Bradford =

American politician

Member of the Houston City Council from the at-large #4 district
- In office January 2, 2010 – January 2, 2016
- Preceded by: Ron Green
- Succeeded by: Amanda Edwards

Houston Chief of Police
- In office January 1997 – January 2004
- Preceded by: Sam Nuchia
- Succeeded by: Harold Hurtt

Personal details
- Born: Houston, Texas
- Party: Democratic
- Spouse: Dr. Dee Jackson
- Occupation: attorney, Police Officer

Clarence O'Neal "C.O." Bradford, known as Brad Bradford during his campaign for Harris Country District Attorney, is an American politician who served as a Houston City Council member and as chief of police of Houston, Texas.

In 2008, Bradford was an unsuccessful Democratic Party candidate for District Attorney of Harris County, Texas. On November 3, 2009, Bradford was elected to the Houston City Council from At-large Position 4 and took office January 2, 2010. In the 2011 election, Bradford won a second term as a Houston City Council member.

== Biography ==
Bradford holds degrees in law from the University of Houston Law Center, criminal justice from Grambling State University, and a public administration degree from Texas Southern University. Also, he is a graduate of the FBI Academy and Harvard University's Kennedy School of Government Program for State and Local Executives.

He became a resident of the city of Houston in 1979. Bradford has lived in Hiram Clarke, Alief, Fondren Southwest, and MacGregor areas. Bradford worked as a Houston police officer for 24 years including seven years as chief of police. He was appointed Houston's police chief in 1996 by Mayor Bob Lanier and re-appointed by Mayor Lee P. Brown. While serving as chief of police, Bradford managed 7,000 personnel and $500 million annual budget. During his tenure, fear of crime declined by the time he left office in 2003 although overall crime increased at a greater rate than the city population.

As a Houston City Council member, Bradford focused on the delivery of core services which include water, garbage, infrastructure issues and safety services. In addition to serving on the Public Safety and Homeland Security Committee, he served as chair of the Ethics, Elections and Council Governance Committee, vice chair of the Budget and Fiscal Affairs Committee and chaired a City of Houston Procurement Process Task Force. In January 2012, members of the Houston City Council elected Bradford as vice mayor pro-tem via unanimous vote.

== Personal life ==
Bradford’s civic activities include serving as a precinct chair, election judge, and deputy voter registrar in Harris County, Texas. He holds memberships and volunteers in numerous community activities, including the ENRICH After-School (Evaluating the Out-of-School-Time Needs, Resources and Initiatives in the Communities of Houston) Houston Livestock Show and Rodeo, Education Foundation of Harris County, American Education Technologies Youth Counselor, Grambling State University's Criminal Justice Advisory Board, Wiley College Criminal Justice Institute, DeVry University Industry Advisory Board, 100 Club, Harris County Constable Precinct 7 Advisory Board and frequently serves as a university guest lecturer, crime prevention and safety awareness speaker.
