= List of Texas Tech University buildings =

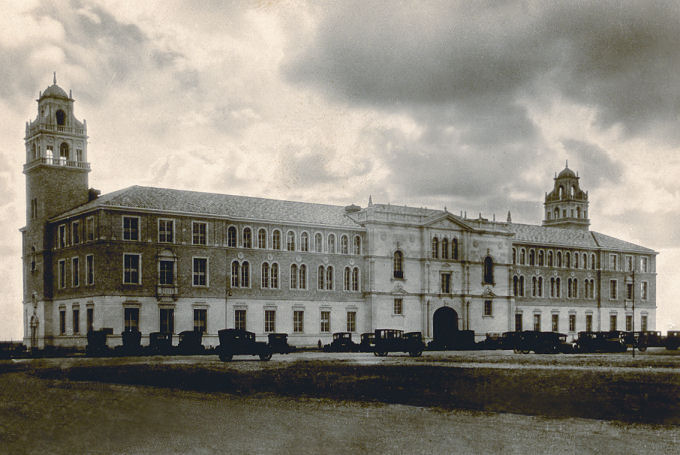
Administration Building

The campus of Texas Tech University is located in the city of Lubbock in the center of the South Plains region near the Caprock Escarpment of the Llano Estacado. Situated on 1,839 acres (7.44 km^{2}).The Lubbock campus is home to the main academic university, law school, and medical school. This arrangement makes it the only institution in Texas to have all three units (undergraduate institution, law school, and medical school) on the same physical campus.

The campus' most prominent feature is its Spanish Renaissance architecture, inspired by the University de Alcalá in Alcalá de Henares, Spain, and Mission San José in San Antonio. A large section of the campus built between 1924 and 1951 is listed on the National Register of Historic Places as the Texas Technological College Historic District.

== Buildings ==
- "—" indicates that the year building opened is unknown.

Texas Technological College Historic District
Contributing property^{†}	Non-contributing property^{‡}

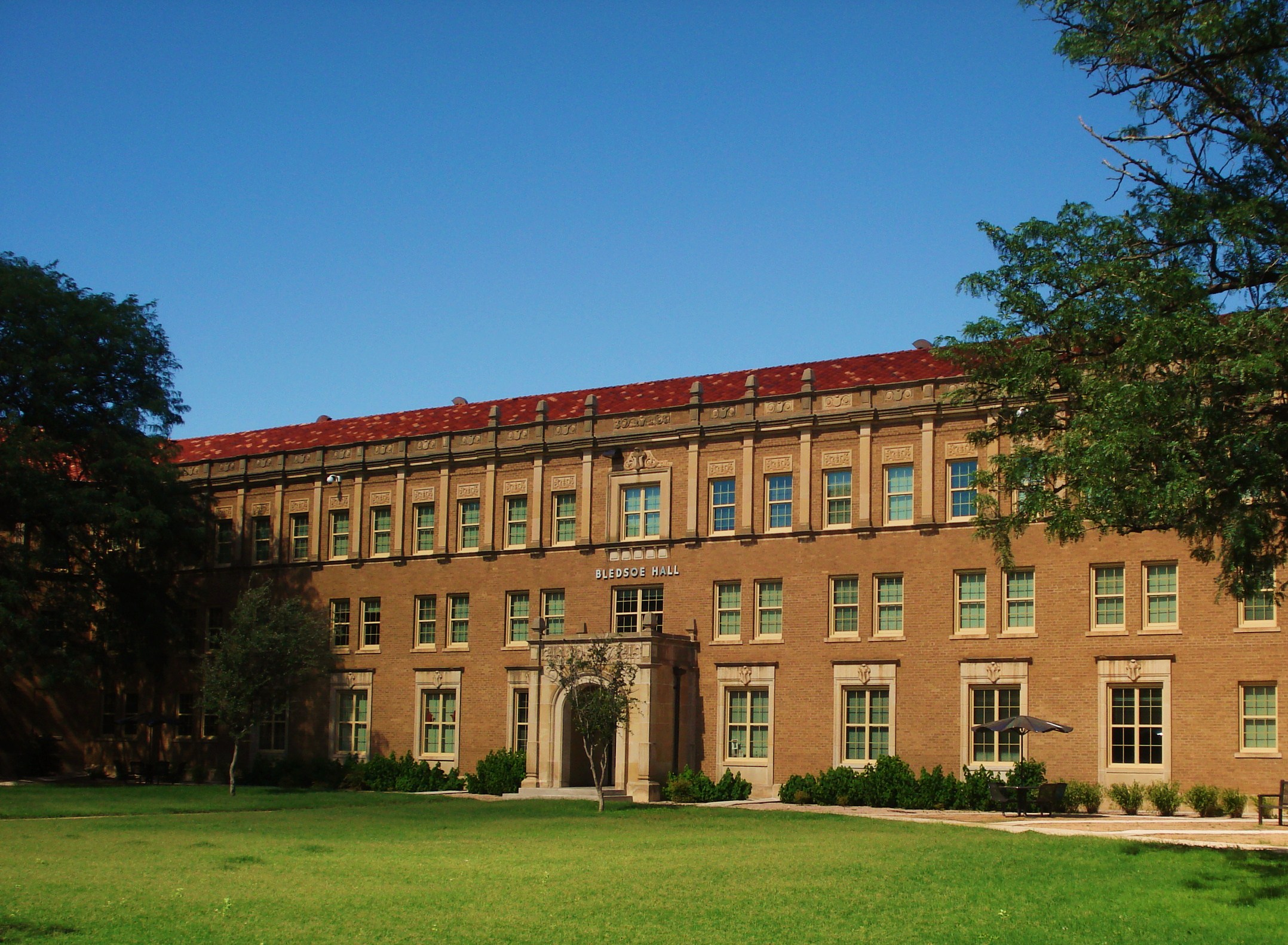
Bledsoe Hall

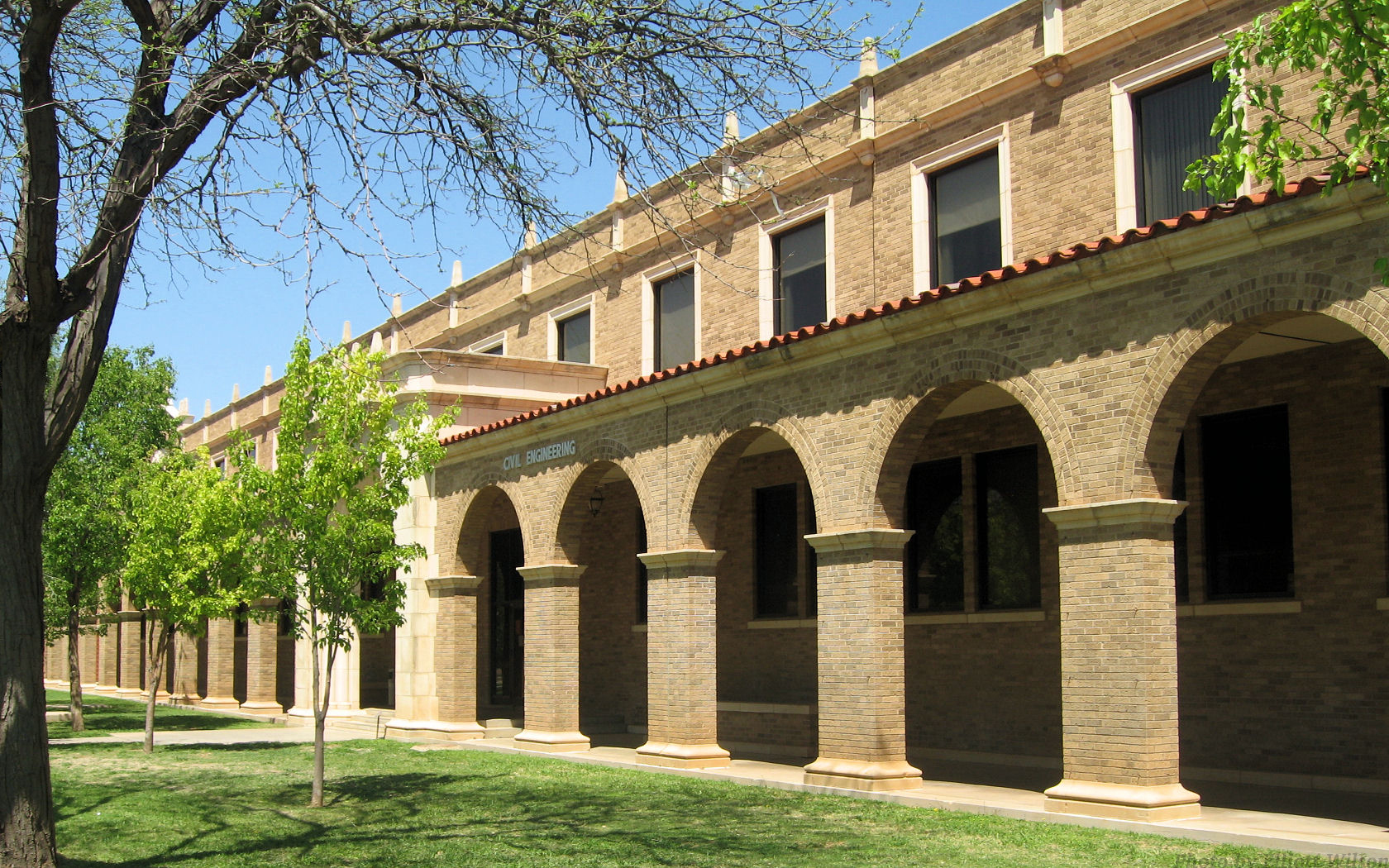
Civil Engineering Building

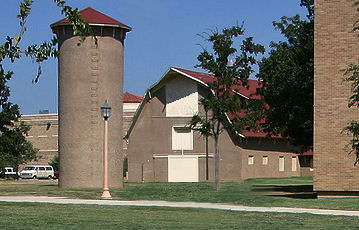
Dairy Barn

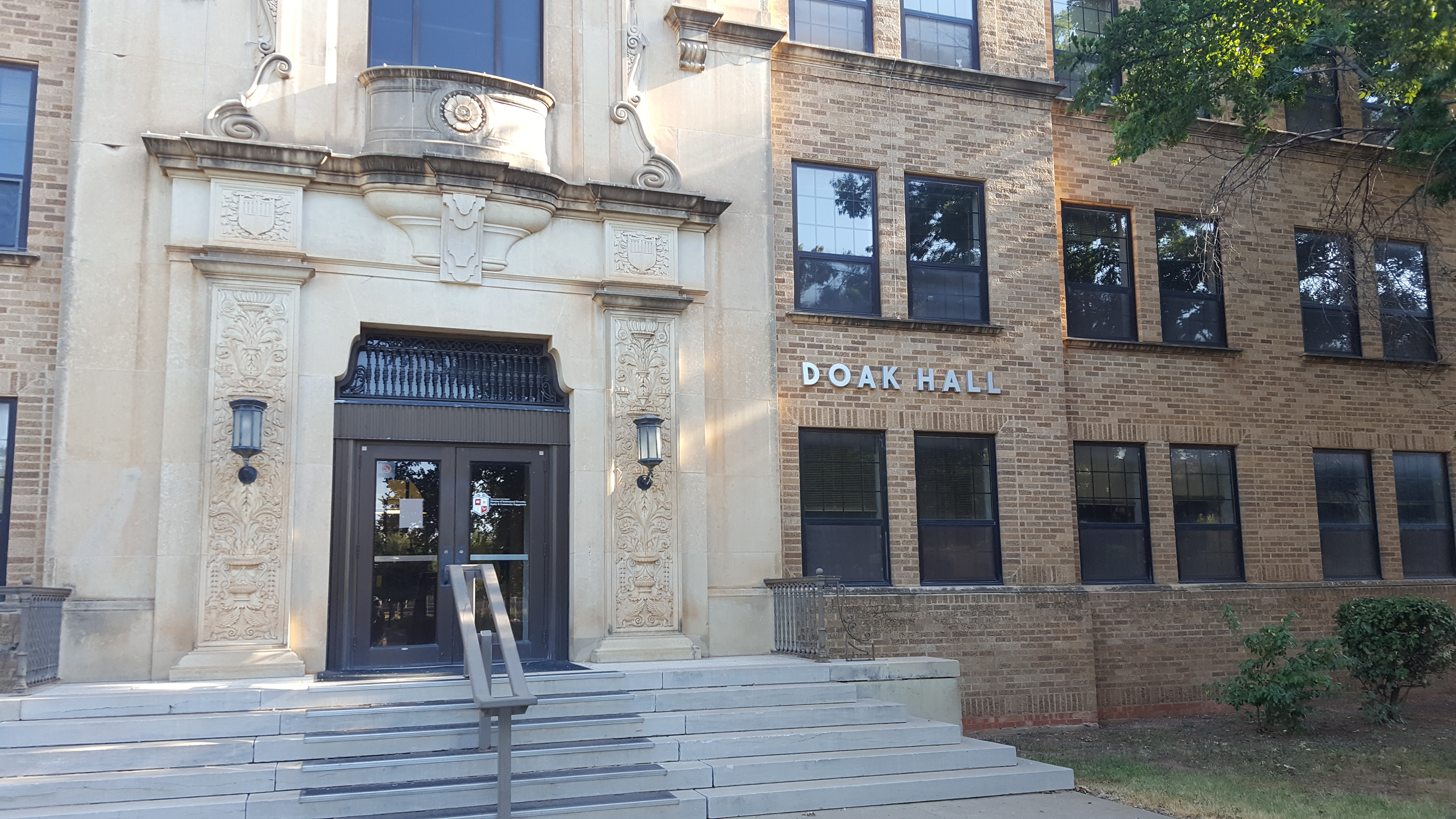
Doak Hall

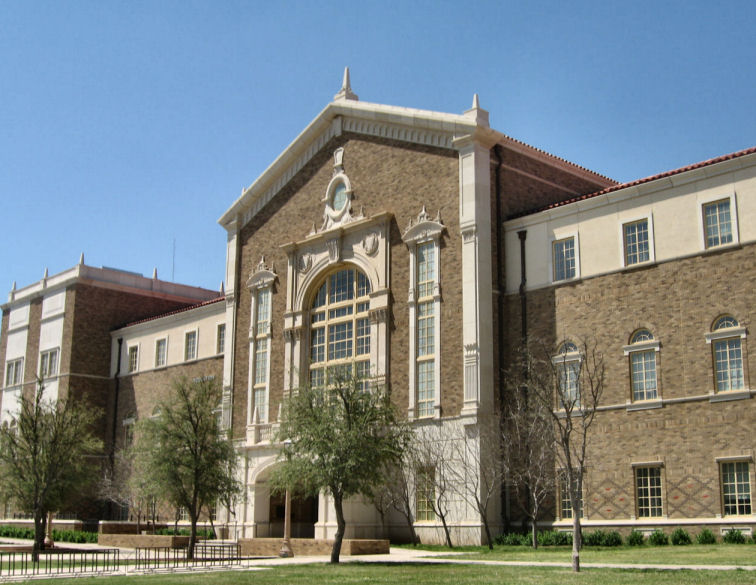
Education Building

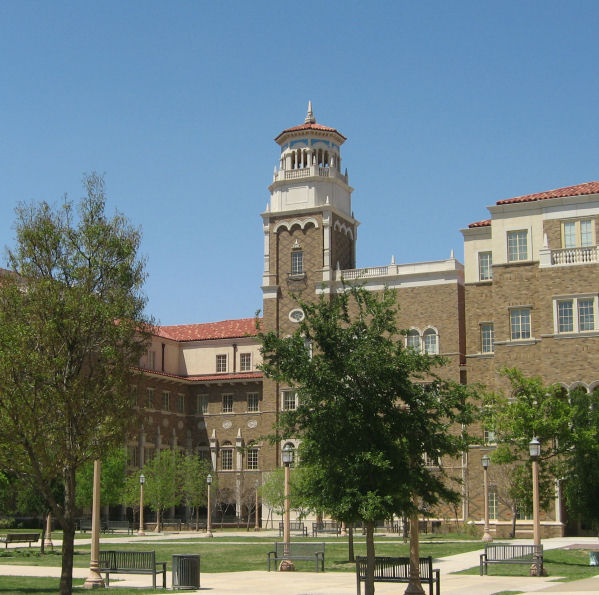
Humanities Building

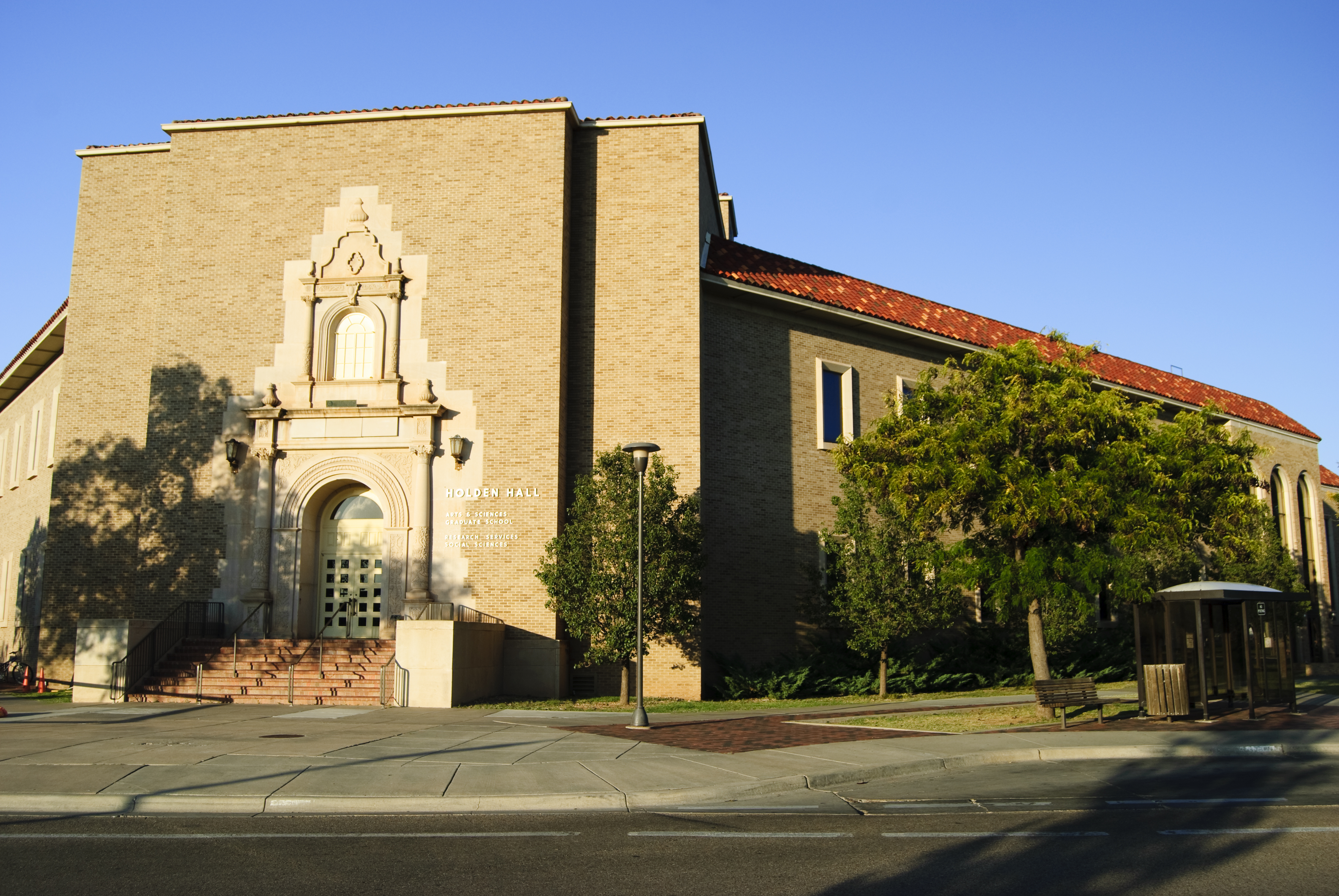
Holden Hall

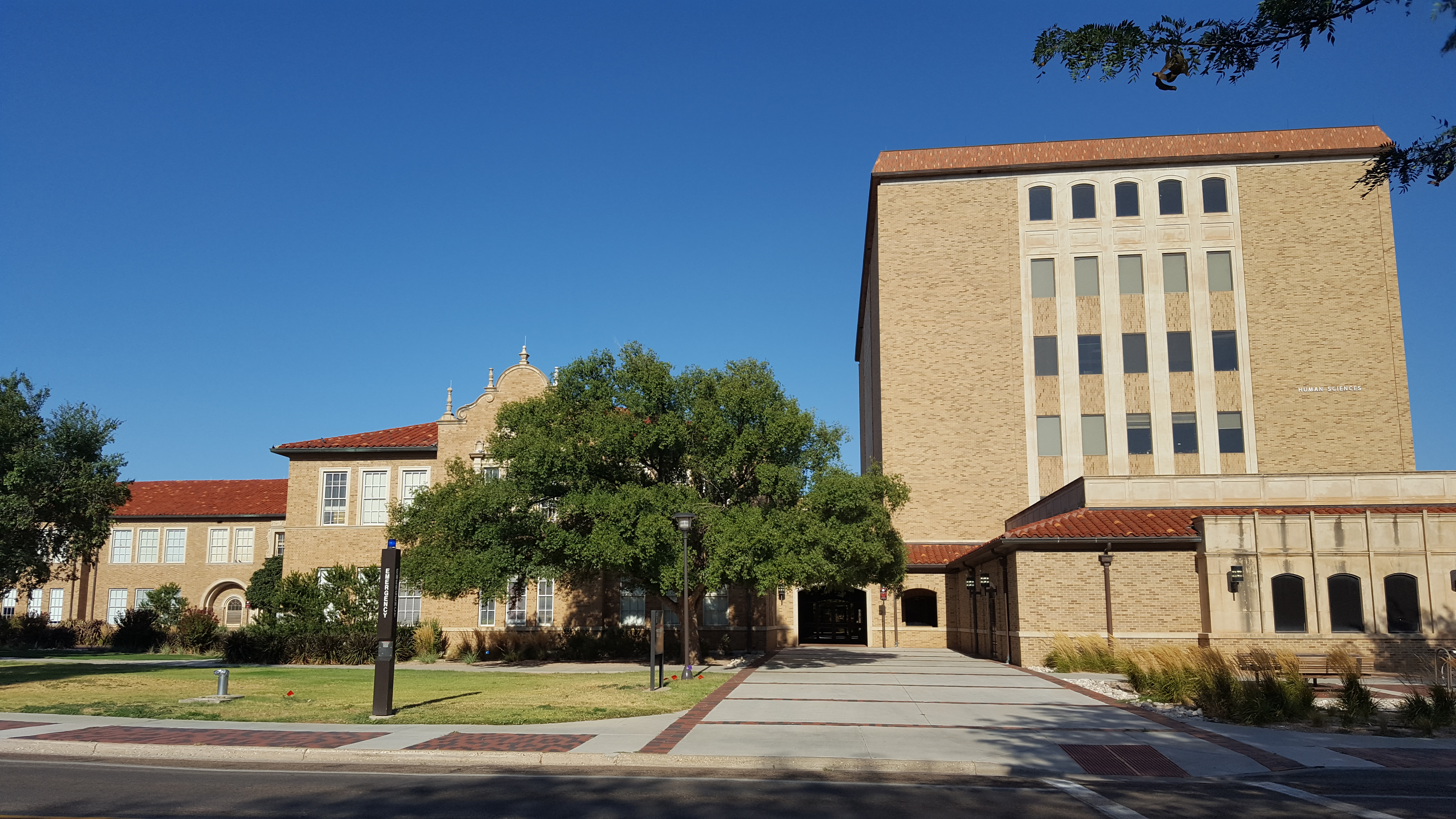
Human Sciences Building

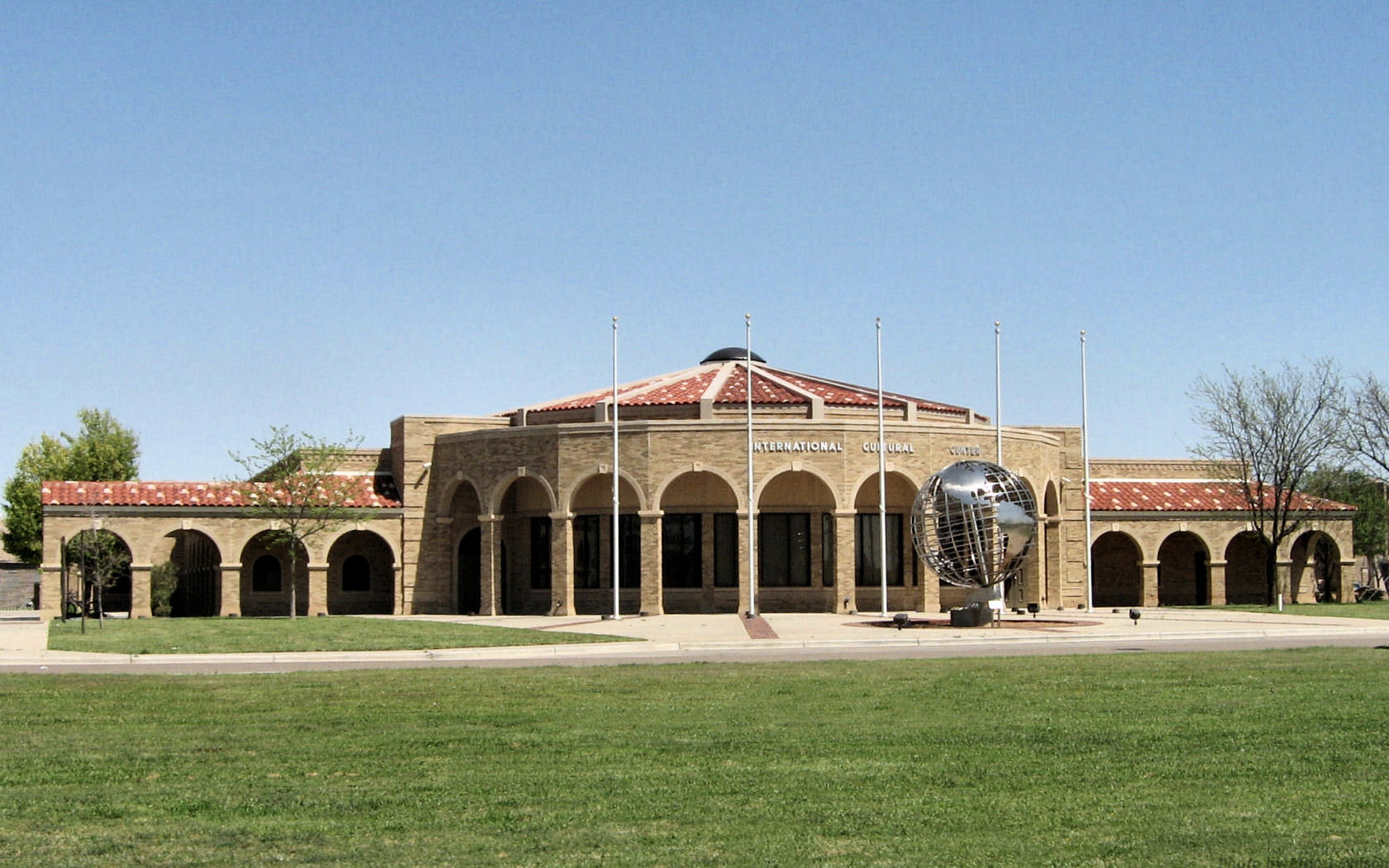
International Cultural Center

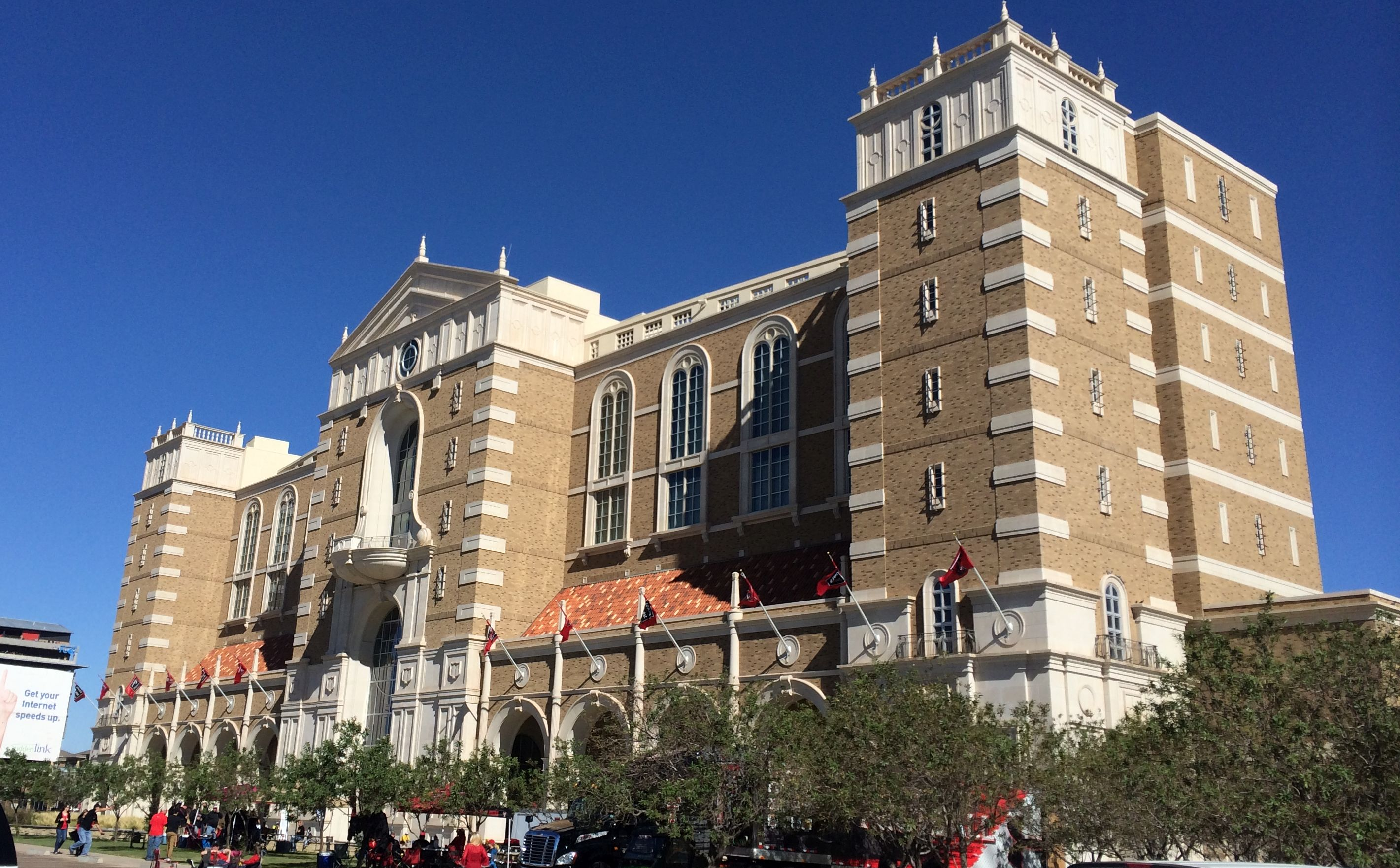
Jones AT&T Stadium West Side

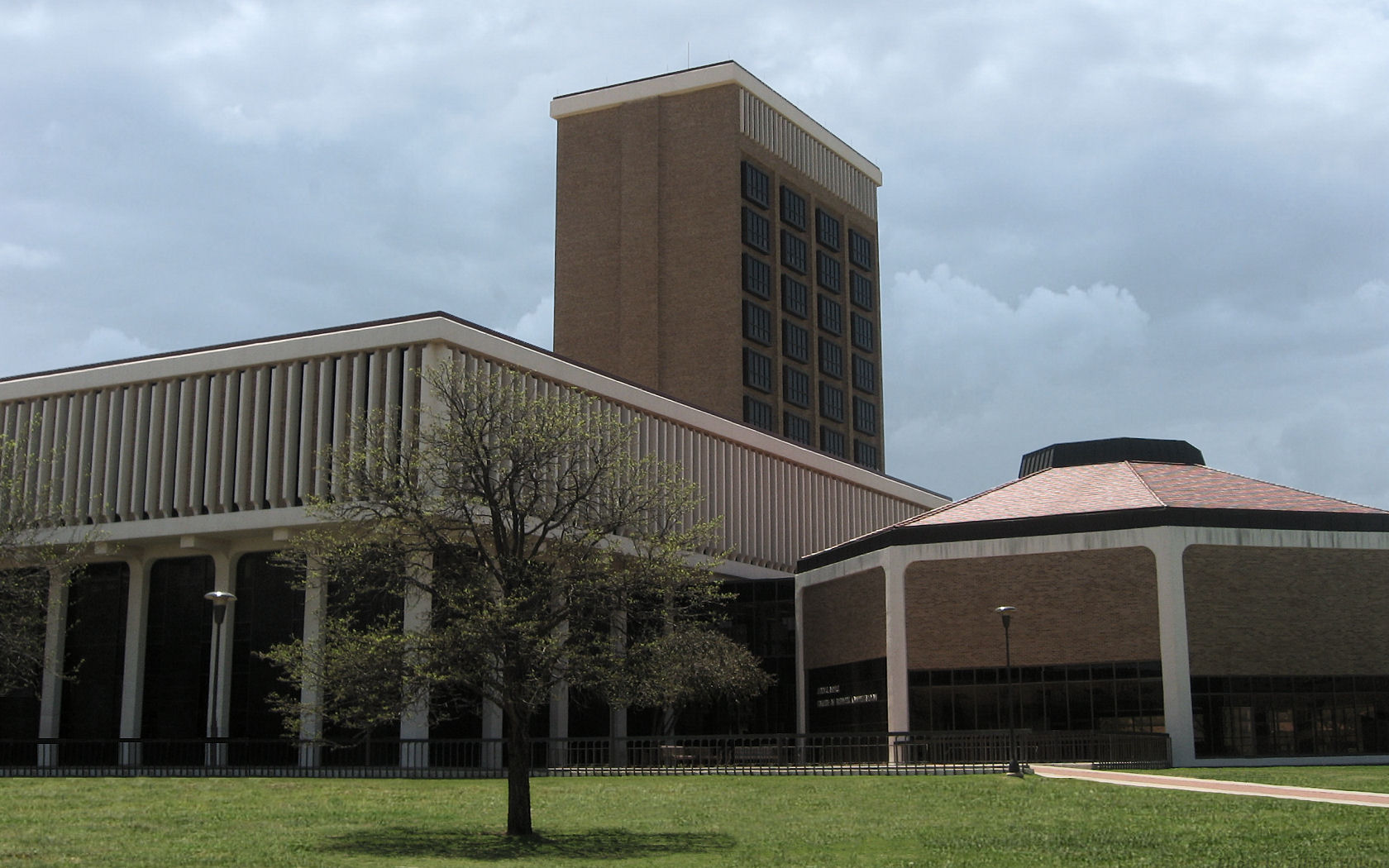
Media and Communications Building

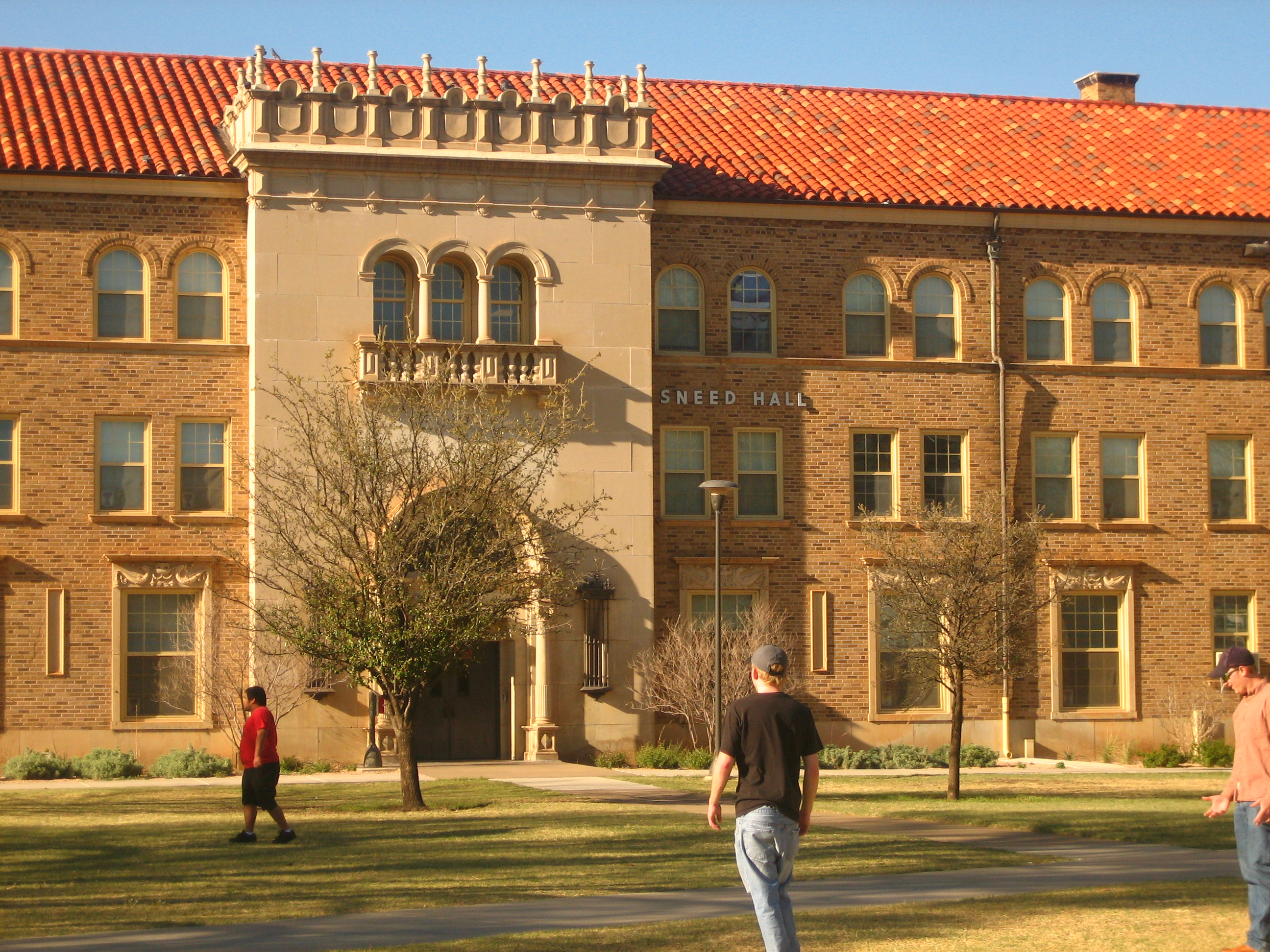
Sneed Hall

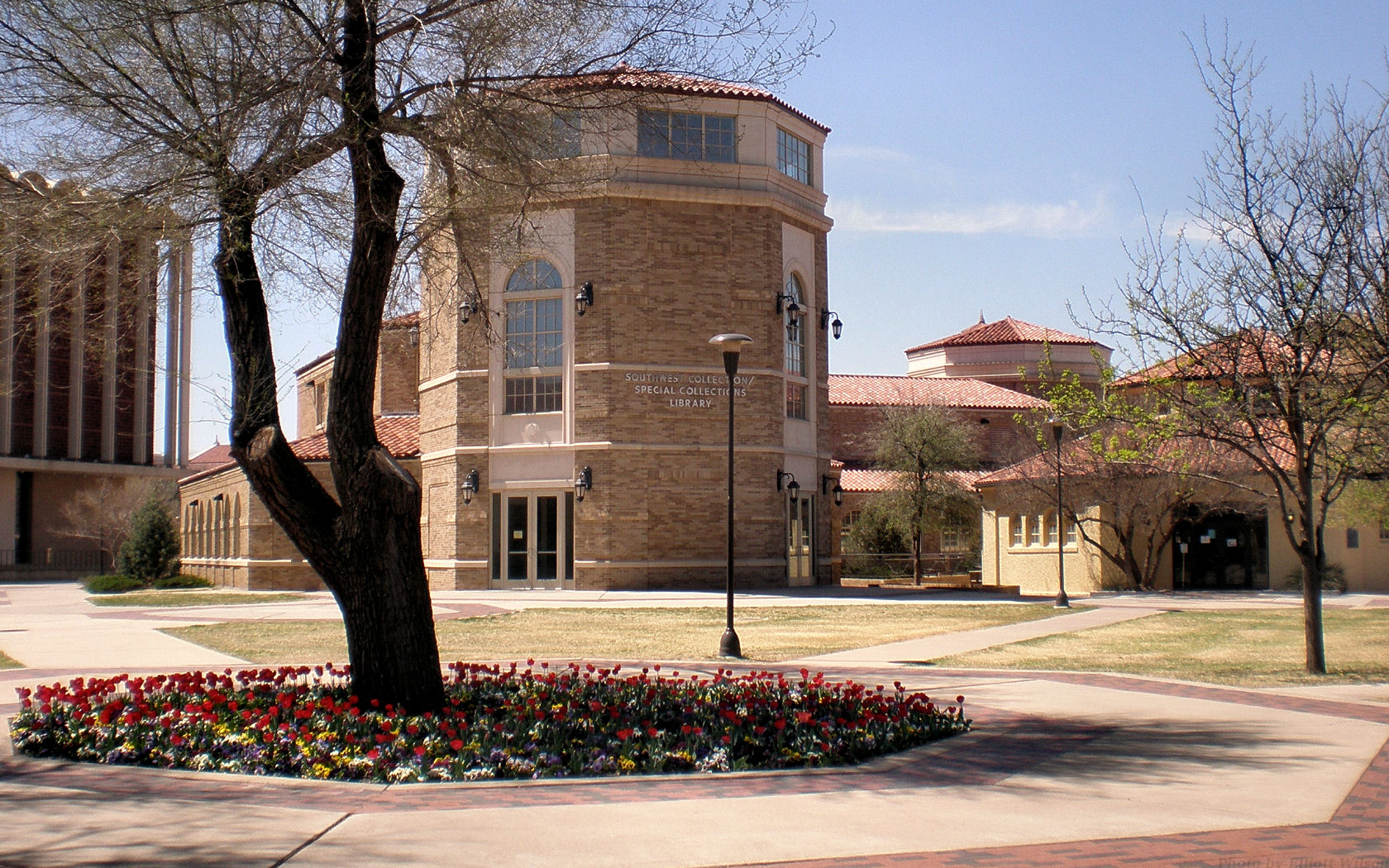
Southwest Collection / Special Collections Library

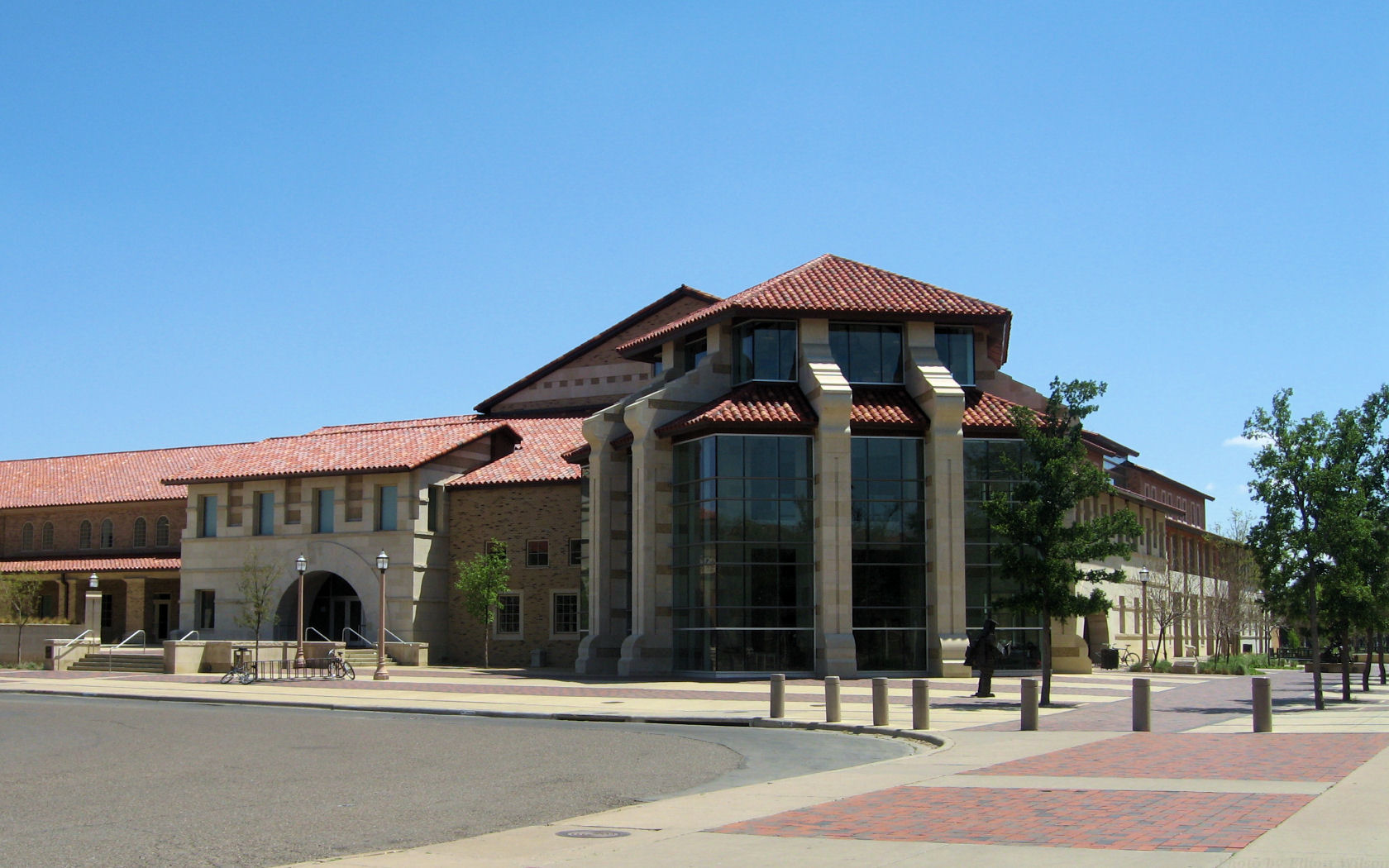
Student Union

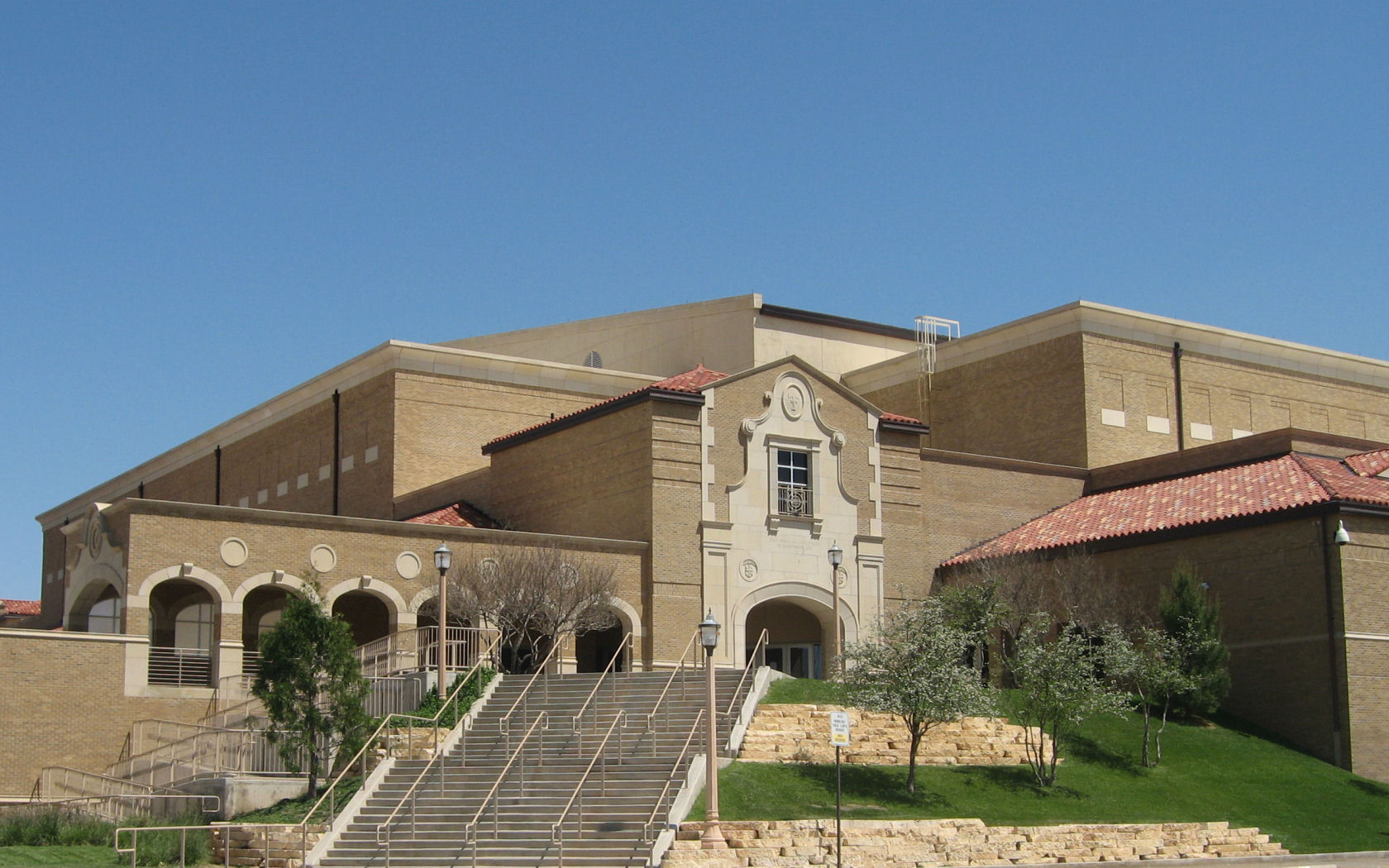
United Spirit Arena

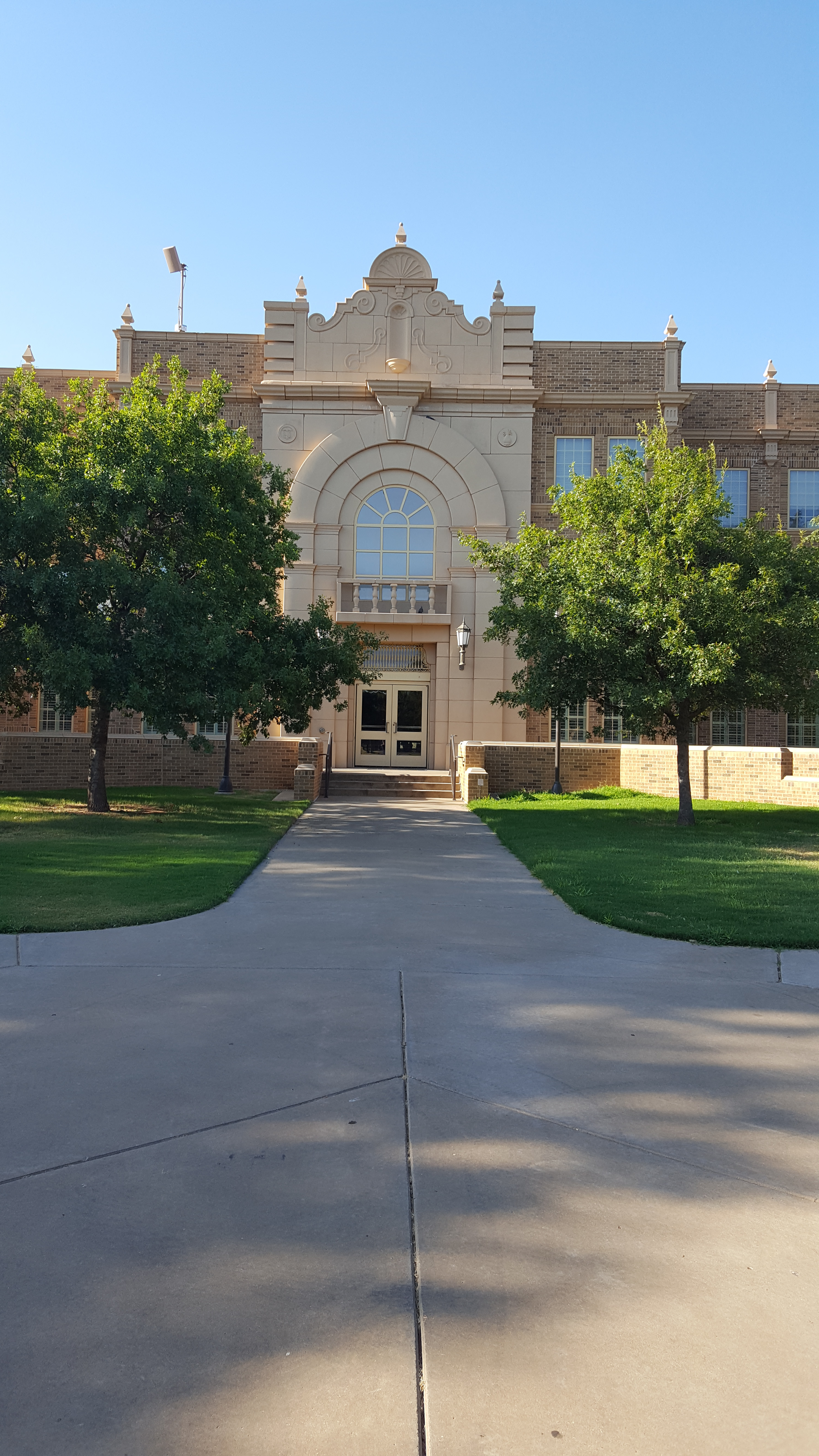
West Hall

Building	Opened	Notes	Reference
Administration^{†}	1925		
Administrative Support Center	—		
Agricultural Education^{†}	1951		
Agricultural Engineering Annex^{†}	1951		
Agricultural Pavilion^{†}	1925	Opened as Livestock Judging Pavilion	
Agricultural Sciences^{†}	1941	Formerly Agriculture	
Animal & Food Sciences	2004		
Architecture	—	Opened as the "Computer-Architecture"	
Art	—		
Athletic Complex	2003		
Burkhart Center for Autism	2013		
Athletic Offices	—		
Athletic Ticket Office	1979	Opened as the Letterman's Lounge	
Athletic Training Center	1986		
Auditorium and Sculpture Court, Helen DeVitt Jones	2001		
Biology	—		
Biology Auditorium	—		
Biology Greenhouse	—		
Bledsoe Hall/Gordon Hall^{†}	1947		
Carpenter/Wells Complex	1959		
Carpenter-Wells Apartment Complex	1998		
Charles E. Maedgen Theatre	—		
Chemical Engineering	—		
Chemistry^{†}	1929	Additions completed in 1971	
Chitwood Hall	1967		
City Bank Auditorium	1956	Opened as Lubbock Municipal Auditorium.	
City Bank Coliseum	1956	Opened as Lubbock Municipal Coliseum.	
Civil Engineering^{†}	1951	Formerly East Engineering	
Clement Hall	1963		
Coleman Hall	1967		
Dairy Barn^{†}	1925	Added to the National Register of Historic Places in 1992.	
Dan Law Field at Rip Griffin Park	—		`
Development^{‡}	1944		
Doak Hall^{†}	1934	Formerly Women's Dormitory #1	
Drane Hall^{†}	1938		
Education	2002	Built along with English and Philosophy Building; first new academic facility built on Texas Tech campus since 1976.	
Electrical Engineering^{†}	1928	Formerly West Engineering	
Electrical Engineering Addition	—		
Engineering and Technology Lab	—		
Engineering Center	—		
Engineering Technology	—		
Exercise Sciences Center	—		
Experimental Sciences	2006		
Fisheries and Wildlife Research	—		
Food Technology	—		
Foreign Language	—		
Frazier Alumni Pavilion	1998		
Galaxy Stadium	1947	Opened as Clifford B. & Audrey Jones Stadium with 27,000 seating capacity. After multiple renovations and additions, it currently seats 60,454.	
Gaston Hall	1957	Demolition begun 20-Sep-2008 to make way for the new Rawls College of Business building	
Gates Hall	1962		
Health Science Center	—		
Holden Hall^{†}	1937	Original site of the West Texas Museum (renamed Museum of Texas Tech University in 1969); named for Dr. Curry Holden historian, archaeologist, and first Director of the Museum.	
Horn Hall^{†}	1947		
Hulen Hall	1963		
Human Sciences Building^{†}	1925	Formerly the Home Economics Building. Four additions to the building with the first being completed in 1952	
Human Sciences Cottage^{†}	1928	Formerly the Home Management House.	
Humanities	2002	Formerly the English/Philosophy Building. Now home to English, Philosophy, and History departments. Built along with Education Building; first new academic facility built on Texas Tech campus since 1976. The old English building was built in 1960 and demolition of it began on December 20, 2004.	
International Culture Center	1997		
Knapp Hall^{†}	1947		
Landscape Architecture & Range Wildlife^{†}	1951	Formerly Veterinary Science-1	
Lanier Professional Development Center	2008	Texas Tech University School of Law	
Law	1970	Texas Tech University School of Law	
Library	1962		
Marsha Sharp Center for Student Athletes	2004		
Media and Communications^{‡}	1969		
Mathematics and Statistics^{†}	1938	Formerly the Library	
McClellan Hall^{†}	1944	Formerly Infirmary	
Mechanical Engineering	—		
Mechanical Engineering Lab^{‡}	1951		
Merket Alumni Center^{†}	1925	Houses the Texas Tech Alumni Association. Formerly the President's House.	
Moody Planetarium	1970		
Murray Hall	2006		
Museum of Texas Tech University	1970		
Music	1951		
Petroleum Engineering	1950		
Physics and Geosciences^{†}	1951	Formerly Science	
Plant Sciences^{‡}			
Psychology	—		
Rawls College of Business	2012		
Recreation Aquatic Facilities	—		
Ronald McDonald House	—		
Sneed Hall^{†}	1938		
Southwest Collection / Special Collections Library	1997		
Sport Studies Center	—	Formerly Women's Gymnasium	
Stangel / Murdough Hall	1964		
Student Media^{†}	1941	Formerly Journalism	
Student Recreation Center, Robert H.Ewalt	—		
Student Union	1951	Opened as "Student Union"; Known as "University Center" 1970-????	
Student Wellness Center	—		
Talkington Hall + Commons Food Court	2013		
Textile Engineering – Industrial Engineering^{†}	1925	Formerly Textile Engineering	
Thompson Hall	1957	Demolition begun 20-Sep-2008 to make way for the new Rawls College of Business building	
United Spirit Arena	1999		
University Theatre	—		
Wall Hall	1962		
Wiggins Complex	—		
West Hall^{†}	1934	Named in honor of James Marion West, Sr., Former Board of Directors Member and Chair	
Weymouth Hall	1967		
