= Figure 2 Ranch =

Coordinates: 31°27′36.3″N 104°50′31.08″W

The Figure 2 Ranch is located in present-day Culberson County, Texas, founded in 1890 by James Monroe Daugherty, a cattle rancher who owned ranches in several states prior to this date. The site was the scene of one of the last battles between the Texas Rangers and the Apache Indians. Daugherty, a former express rider for the Confederate Army in the American Civil War and a founding member of the Texas and Southwestern Cattle Raisers Association lived on the ranch by 1905 and would later serve on the local county commission for Culberson County after its founding in 1911. At the age of 83, Daugherty sold the ranch to ranching, timber, and oil tycoon James Marion West, Sr. in 1933. West never lived on the ranch, but his son James Jr. maintained a home there which he used as one of his many residences. The ranch remained in the West family until 1992. The Figure 2 Ranch Airport is located on the property. At its height, the ranch encompassed some 175,000 acres. The Figure 2 Ranch is now owned by Jeff Bezos, who is building a 10,000 year clock in part of the Sierra Diablo Mountains that lie on the ranch property. Part of the Figure 2 Ranch property serves as a Blue Origin test and launch facility.
