= West Hall =

West Hall may refer to:

- West Hall, Kew, a 17th-century house in the London Borough of Richmond upon Thames
- West Hall, Longburton, Grade I-listed mansion in Longburton, Dorset

== United States ==
- West Hall (Kansas State University), a dormitory at Kansas State University
- West Hall (Valdosta State University), building at Valdosta State University, Valdosta, Georgia
- West Hall (Rensselaer Polytechnic Institute), a historic building at RPI in Troy, New York
- West Hall (Texas Tech University), a historic building at Texas Tech in Lubbuck, Texas
- West Hall High School, a high school in Oakwood, Georgia
- Waldschmidt Hall, originally West Hall, at the University of Portland in Oregon
- West Hall (Tufts University), a historic dormitory at Tufts University
- West Hall (Western Kentucky University), listed on the National Register of Historic Places in Warren County, Kentucky
- West Sitting Hall, in the White House, Washington, D.C.
