= Figure 2 Ranch Airport =

- IATA: none; ICAO: none; FAA LID: 88TA

Summary
- Airport type: Private
- Owner: Ronald P Stasny
- Location: Van Horn, Texas
- Elevation AMSL: 3,700 ft / 1,127.8 m
- Coordinates: 31°27.3575′N 104°50.6632′W

Map

Runways
Direction	Length		Surface
Direction	ft	m	Surface
01/19	4,000	1,219	Turf (22.9 m or 75 ft wide)

Figure 2 Ranch Airport (FAA LID: 88TA) is a private airport located 24 miles north of Van Horn, Culberson County, Texas, USA. It is located on the Figure 2 Ranch formerly owned by James M. West Sr. and his descendants who installed the airport.
