= Wesley West =

American businessman (1906–1984)

Wesley Wendell West
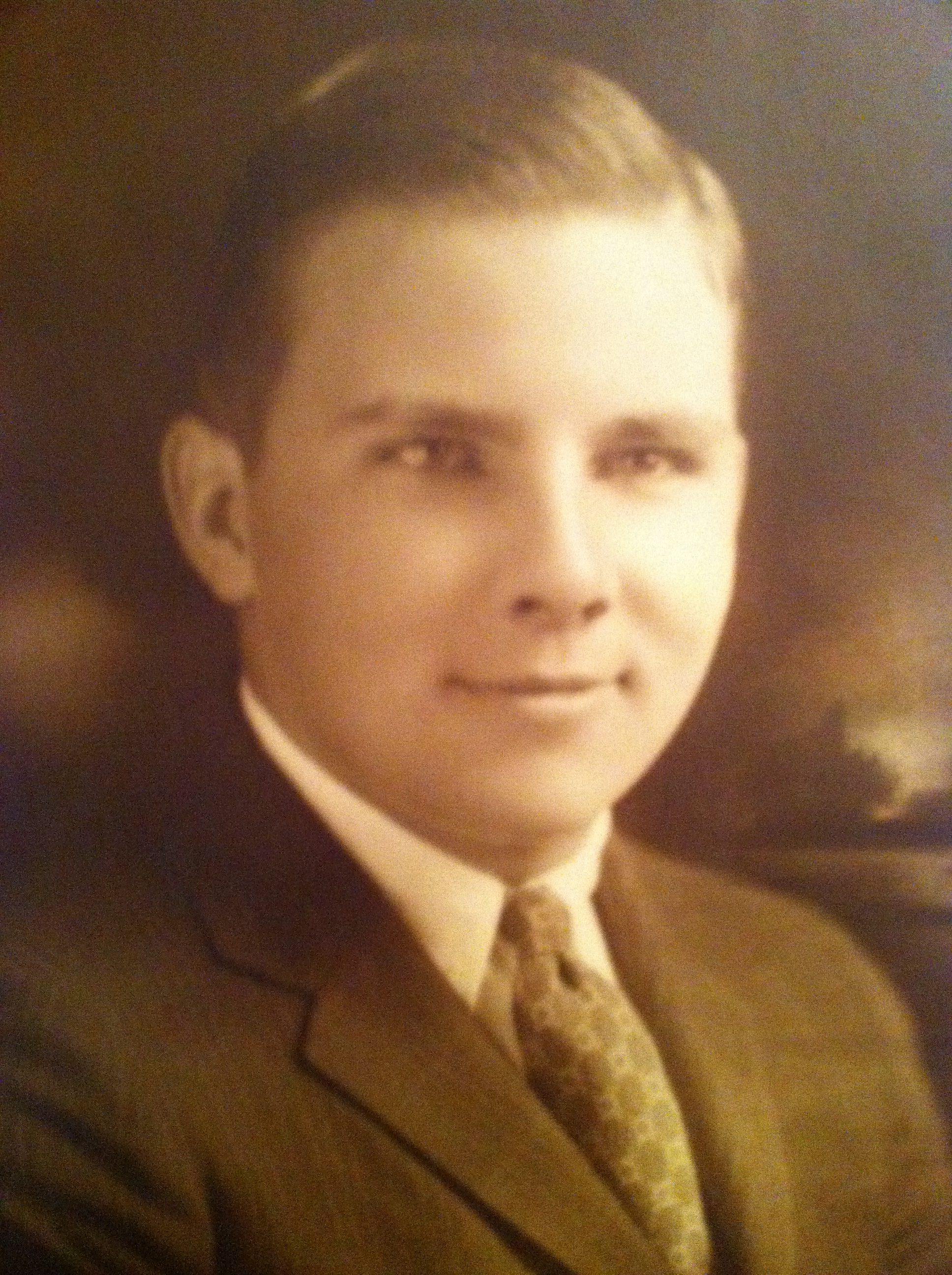
- Born: Wesley Wendell West; June 6, 1906
- Died: 1984 (aged 77–78)
- Known for: Businessman
- Spouse: Neva Yvonne (née Watkins) West
- Children: 3
- Father: James Marion West Sr.
- Relatives: James Marion West Jr. (brother)

Wesley Wendell West (June 6, 1906 – 1984) was an American businessman. He was the second son of James Marion West Sr. and younger brother of James Marion West Jr. Like his brother and father before him, he was a noted Texas rancher, oilman, and philanthropist. He founded Wesley West Minerals, a mineral rights owning entity currently operating in Texas, Alabama, Mississippi, and New Mexico, and Wesley West Cattle L.P.

== Biography ==
Born June 6, 1906, West married Neva Yvonne (née Watkins) in 1930. Together, they had three children; sons Wesley (who died of leukemia at age seven) and James W., and daughter Betty Ann.

Along with his wife, Wesley was a noteworthy patron of the arts in the Houston area with gifts to the Houston Grand Opera, the Houston Symphony, and the Museum of Fine Arts, Houston. Wesley and Neva also donated generously to the Baylor College of Medicine, the Texas Medical Center, and Texas A&M Health Science Center. The Neva and Wesley West Chair at A&M is named in their honor (currently held by Magnus Hook ) as is the Neva and Wesley West Scholarship in the College of Business Administration at Sam Houston State University. Together, they founded the Neva and Wesley West Foundation, now the Stedman West Foundation, which continues their philanthropic activities through the present day.

West inherited the West Ranch in Blanco County, Texas from his father James M. West, Sr. The West Ranch Airport (XS75), a privately owned field with a single 5,561-foot strip, is located on the property some 8 nautical miles west of the town of Round Mountain.

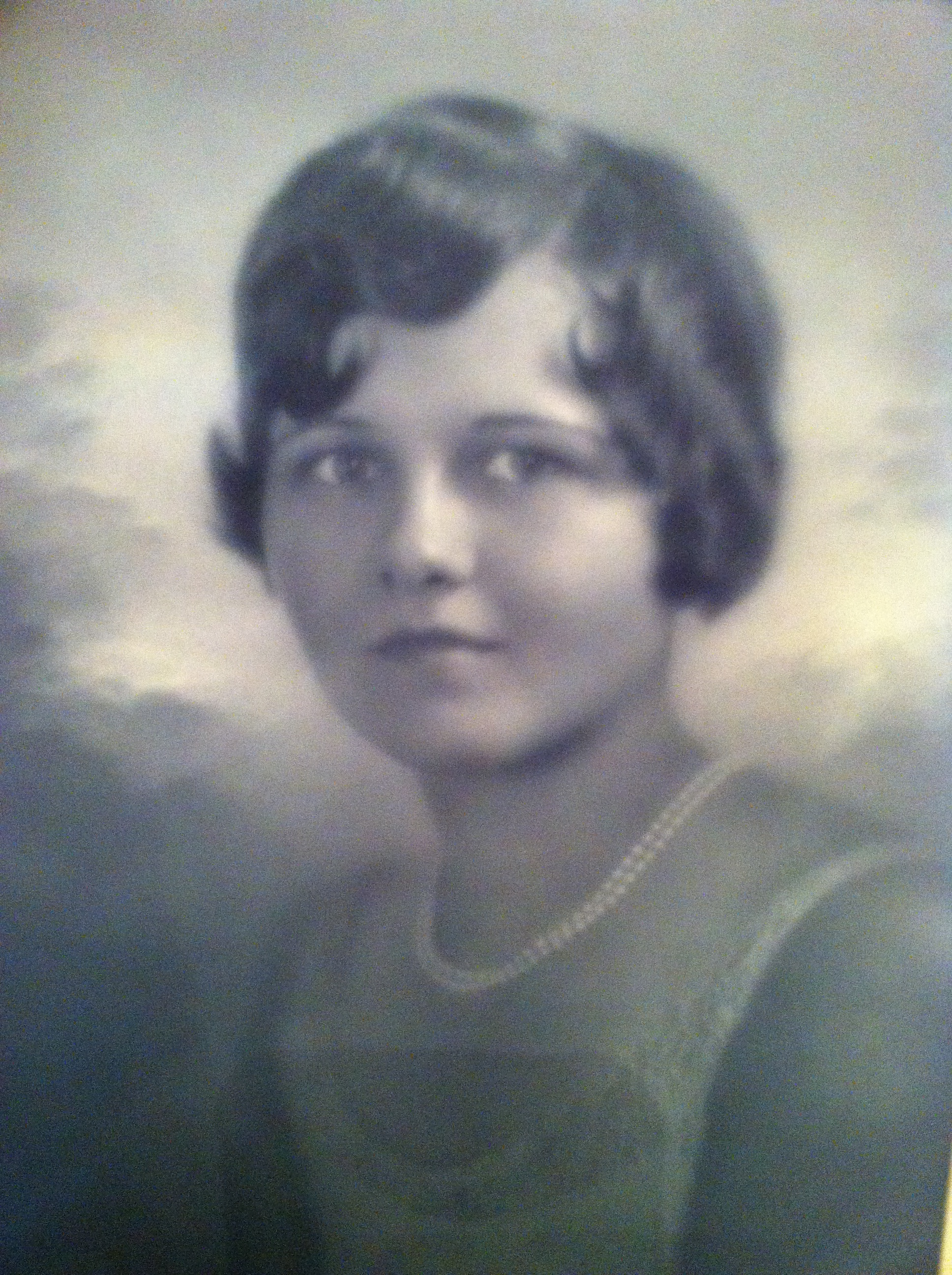
Neva Yvonne (née Watkins) West

== Friendship with Lyndon B. Johnson ==
West co-owned KBTC radio in Austin along with businessmen E.G. Kingsbury and Robert B. Anderson (former State of Texas Tax Commissioner and future Secretary of the Treasury). Kingsbury had been an opponent of Johnson's political ambitions but thanks to Johnson's assistance in getting his son admitted to the United States Naval Academy, he agreed to give Johnson his ownership of the station. Johnson traveled to the West Ranch in the Texas Hill Country to persuade Wesley to sell his interest in the company. A conservative Republican, West was skeptical at first, but the two had a personal connection that led to a lifetime friendship. West sold his portion of KBTC (now KLBJ) to Johnson (the actual ownership was in Lady Bird Johnson's name). The two men and their families remained close in the following years, with the Johnsons being frequent guests at the West Ranch near Stonewall, Texas along with fellow West friend and associate Stuart Symington. Mrs. Johnson later referred to Neva as "the sweetest friend I have ever known".

== Philanthropy ==
West and his wife were philanthropists giving to a variety of causes. Two of these, higher education and the arts, stand out. West gave funds to create the Neva and Wesley West Scholarship in the College of Business Administration at Sam Houston State University. Together, they gave generously to the Baylor College of Medicine in Houston notably to the Department of Ophthalmology. The Neva and Wesley West Chair in the Texas A&M Health Sciences Center, Graduate School of Biomedical Sciences, Houston, Institute of Biosciences and Technology was created to fund faculty conducting research to ultimately aid in the treatment of infectious diseases. They also gave generously to the Texas Medical Center, the largest medical center in the world, of which Neva was a lifetime Director. Upon her death in 2007, the Texas Medical Center flags were flown at half-mast for days. His wife Neva was a true patron of the arts, giving numerous donations to the Houston Grand Opera (of which she was a member of the board), the Houston Symphony, and the Houston Museum of Fine Arts (of which she was a lifetime trustee). The Houston Symphony gave a concert gala in her honor in 1993. Together, Wesley and Neva created the Neva and Wesley West Foundation, now the Stedman West Foundation, which continues their philanthropic activities. The foundation gave funds to aid in the creation of Jesus Bautista Moroles' Houston Police Officer's Memorial in 1990.

== Homes ==
West inherited many properties and associated businesses from his father's estate, much of which he shared with his brother James Jr. Two of these were the Indio and Chupadero ranches. In 1960, West divided these ranches with James Jr.'s heirs keeping the consolidated middle sections of the properties. He named these 40,000 acres the Faith Ranch. The ranch is maintained by descendants of his daughter Betty Ann West Stedman.
