= Westville, Texas =

- Unincorporated community
- Location within Texas Location within the United States
- Coordinates: 31°0′57″N 95°18′4″W
- Country: United States
- State: Texas
- County: Trinity
- Elevation: 292 ft (89 m)
- Time zone: UTC-6 (Central (CST))
  - Summer (DST): UTC-5 (CDT)
- Area codes: 430 & 903
- GNIS feature ID: 1382942

Westville is an unincorporated community located in Trinity County, Texas, United States. According to the Handbook of Texas, the community had a population of 46 in 2000. It is located within the Huntsville, Texas micropolitan area.

== History ==
In 1898, James Marion West Sr. and Peter Josserand Jr. founded a sawmill, around which Westville was built.

== Geography ==
Westville is located on Texas State Highway 94, 4 mi (6.4 km) west of Groveton in central Trinity County.

== Education ==
Westville is served by the Groveton Independent School District.
