= Agricultural Pavilion =

Building in Lubbock, Texas, U.S.

Coordinates: 33°34′56″N 101°52′36″W

- Interactive map of the Agricultural Pavilion area
- Former names: Livestock Judging Pavilion

General information
- Architectural style: Mission Revival
- Location: Lubbock, Texas
- Construction started: 1924
- Completed: 1925

Design and construction
- Architect: Wyatt C. Hedrick
- Architecture firm: Sanguinet, Staats, and Hedrick
- Other designers: William Ward Watkin
- Livestock Judging Pavilion
- U.S. Historic district – Contributing property
- Part of: Texas Technological College Historic District (ID96000523)
- Designated CP: 1996

The Agricultural Pavilion (formerly known as the Livestock Judging Pavilion) is a contributing property to the Texas Technological College Historic District on the campus of Texas Tech University in Lubbock, Texas. The Agricultural Pavilion was one of the campus' original buildings and opened in 1926. It served as the home court for Texas Tech basketball teams until 1927 when the gymnasium was completed.

== History ==
The Livestock Judging Pavilion was one of the first four structures Texas Tech built specifically for agricultural education.
