= James Marion West Jr. =

American oilman (1903–1957)

James M. West Jr.
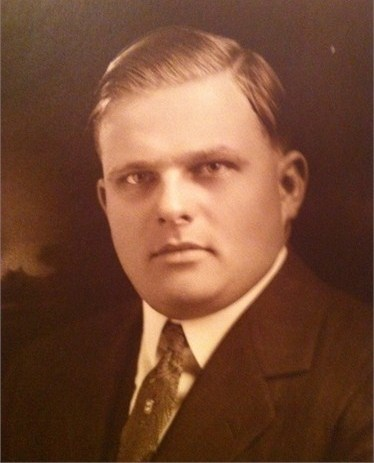
- Born: September 26, 1903; San Antonio, Texas, US
- Died: December 18, 1957 (aged 54); Houston, Texas, US
- Resting place: Forest Park Cemetery, Houston, Texas
- Other names: Silver Dollar Jim, Diamond Jim
- Known for: Oil, lumber, and ranching tycoon
- Spouse: Alice (née) Robertson
- Parent(s): James Marion West Sr., Jessie Gertrude (née Dudley) West
- Relatives: Wesley West (brother)

James Marion West Jr. (September 26, 1903 – December 18, 1957) was a Texas oilman. He was the son of James Marion West Sr., the businessman who created the West family fortune, and brother of Wesley West. He was nicknamed "Silver Dollar Jim" because of his habit of throwing silver dollar coins toward passersby on the street. He was also called "Diamond Jim" because of the diamond-studded Texas Ranger badge he wore. He was known to chase criminals right behind the police. West kept a fleet of thirty cars, mostly Cadillacs, in or around downtown Houston, which were equipped with an arsenal of 30–35 guns. He became an iconic fixture at Galveston casinos such as the Balinese Room. He is considered to be an archetype for the eccentric Texas oilman.

== Personal life ==
West was born to James M. West Sr. and Jessie Gertrude (née Dudley) in San Antonio, Bexar County, Texas, on September 26, 1903. He would move with his family to Houston when he was two. He had two younger siblings, brother Wesley and sister Mildred. Like his father, he would enter the oil, cattle ranching, and lumber industries. West graduated from Southwestern University in Georgetown, Texas, an institution financially supported by his father who was a Director of the university. He then subsequently graduated from the School of Law at the University of Texas at Austin. Outgoing and outspoken, West was a decided opposite of his modest father and earned a reputation for outlandish habits in his business and personal life.

West enjoyed his wealth, and enjoyed showing it off. He frequently sported customized monogrammed cowboy boots, large gold belt buckles, and diamond and platinum accessories. He gained his nickname “Silver Dollar Jim” due to his tendency to leave large $20 to $25 tips in silver dollars and because he gave them away to strangers on the street. He repeatedly tossed handfuls of silver dollars in restaurants and bars so he could watch the wait staff and others chase after the rolling coins. At parties, he would toss them into pools and laugh as people dove in after them. About five months after his death, executors of his estate found numerous barrels, bags, and other containers full of silver dollars along with a cache of $2 bills worth about $250,000 (or over $2 million in March 2013 dollars) in his basement.

He kept a veritable fleet of cars, mostly Cadillacs, at his various homes and in a 3-story parking garage he owned in Houston. He also owned four airplanes including a DC-3 and a Twin Beech.

West died from diabetes in Houston on December 18, 1957. His estate was valued at over $100 million; a figure equivalent to $1.092 billion in December 2023 dollars.
