= West Hall (Texas Tech University) =

- U.S. Historic district – Contributing property
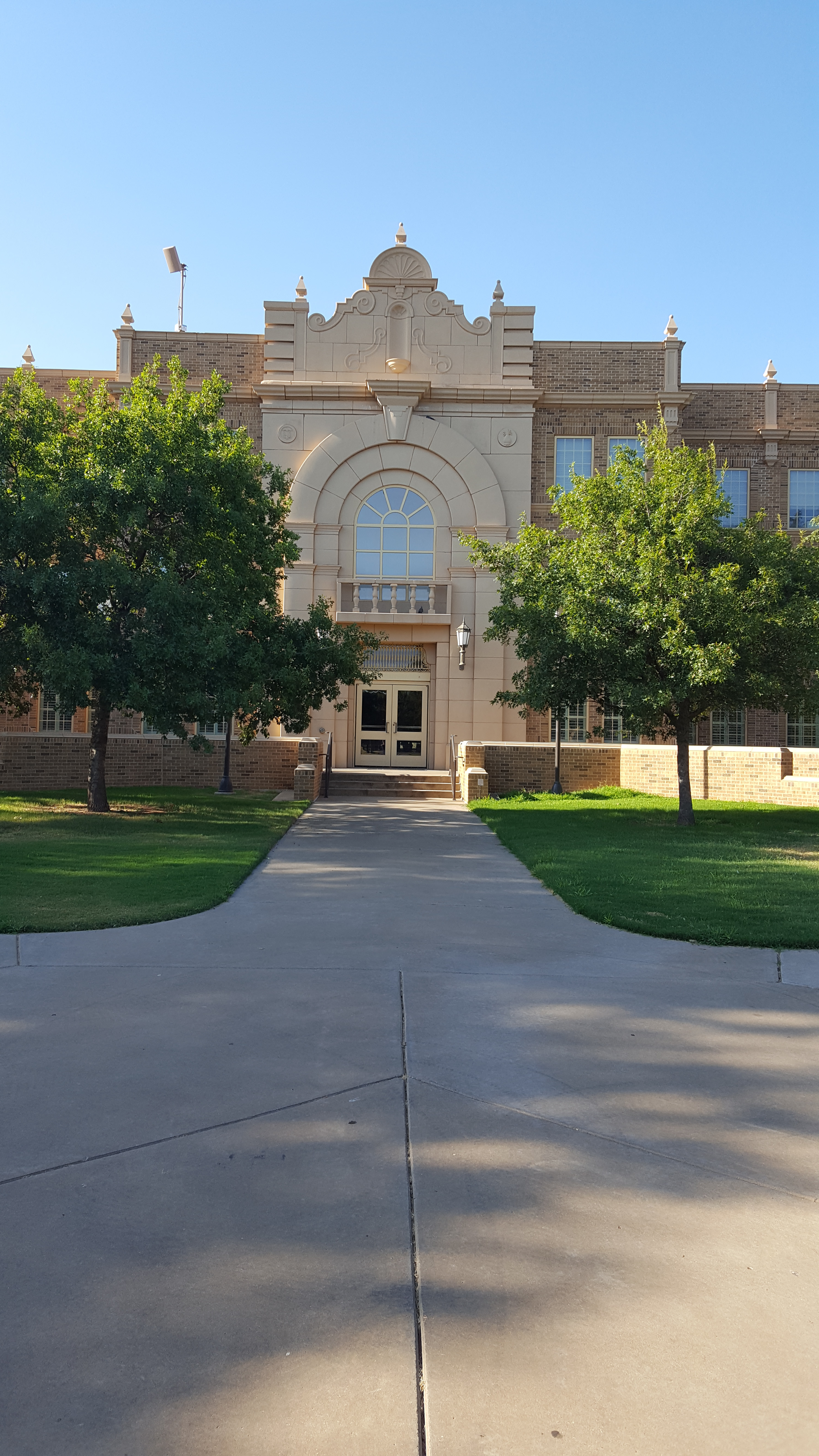

- Location within Texas Location within the United States
- Location: 2500 Broadway Street, Lubbock, Texas, U.S.
- Coordinates: 33°35′06.8″N 101°52′21.0″W
- Built: 1934
- Architect: Wyatt C. Hedrick
- Architectural style: Spanish
- Part of: Texas Technological College Historic District (ID96000523)
- Designated CP: May 10, 1996

West Hall is a building on the campus of Texas Tech University in Lubbock, Texas, United States. It was designed by noted American architect Wyatt C. Hedrick. Originally designated “Men’s Dormitory #1”, the building was subsequently renamed West Hall after James Marion West Sr., a Texas businessman and philanthropist who was a member of the university's board.

== History ==
When the university opened in 1925, it was without residential facilities, and students either commuted from their own homes or resided with local residents. Although dormitories were included in the initial master plan for the college developed by W.W. Watkin, initial student enrollment and state appropriations delayed creation of housing on campus for some time. After several attempts to get financial support, then Tech President Bradford Knapp garnered Federal support for the creation of the building via Public Works Administration funding. Knapp was acquainted with the President Franklin Roosevelt and this relationship aided in securing funds for this and related PWA projects for the university. In the initial campus master plan, Watkin proposed smaller, two-story structures of ornate Spanish architecture with clay tile roofs for the resident halls. Given the realities of the Depression-era funding, a larger three-story flat-roof structure was eventually constructed. A second residence hall, Women's Dormitory #1 (now Doak Hall), was conceived and funded by the PWA at the same time. Both were designed by Watkin during a time when the bulk of his work was for the PWA. His work for the PWA was so extensive, he had moved himself and his family into the Mayflower Hotel in Washington, DC. Watkin, his colleagues, and their families lived in the hotel in one set of rooms, while the team worked on drafting tables in others. West and Doak sit across from one another on Broadway. The buildings were noted in a Life (magazine) article highlighting PWA and other Federal Aid projects in its January 4, 1937 edition.

The building would be later named West Hall in honor of James Marion West, Sr. who served on the board of the university from 1935 to 1941 and chaired it during the period from 1940 to 1941. After serving as a dorm, the building was subsequently converted to more administrative duties, and after an update and remodel in 2006 by Adling and Associates, the building now houses the Texas Tech Visitors Center and the Texas Tech Office of Admissions. The building is one of several included in the National Register of Historic Places Texas Technological College Historic District.

== Gallery ==
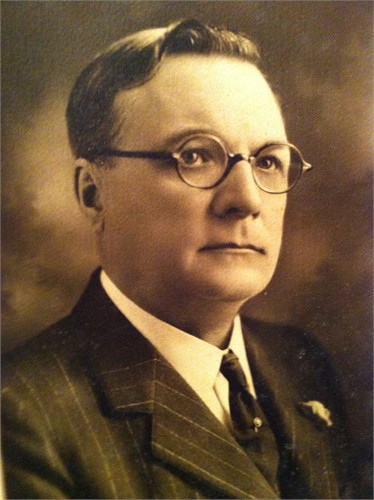
James Marion West, Sr., former member and President of the Texas Tech Board, for whom the building is named.

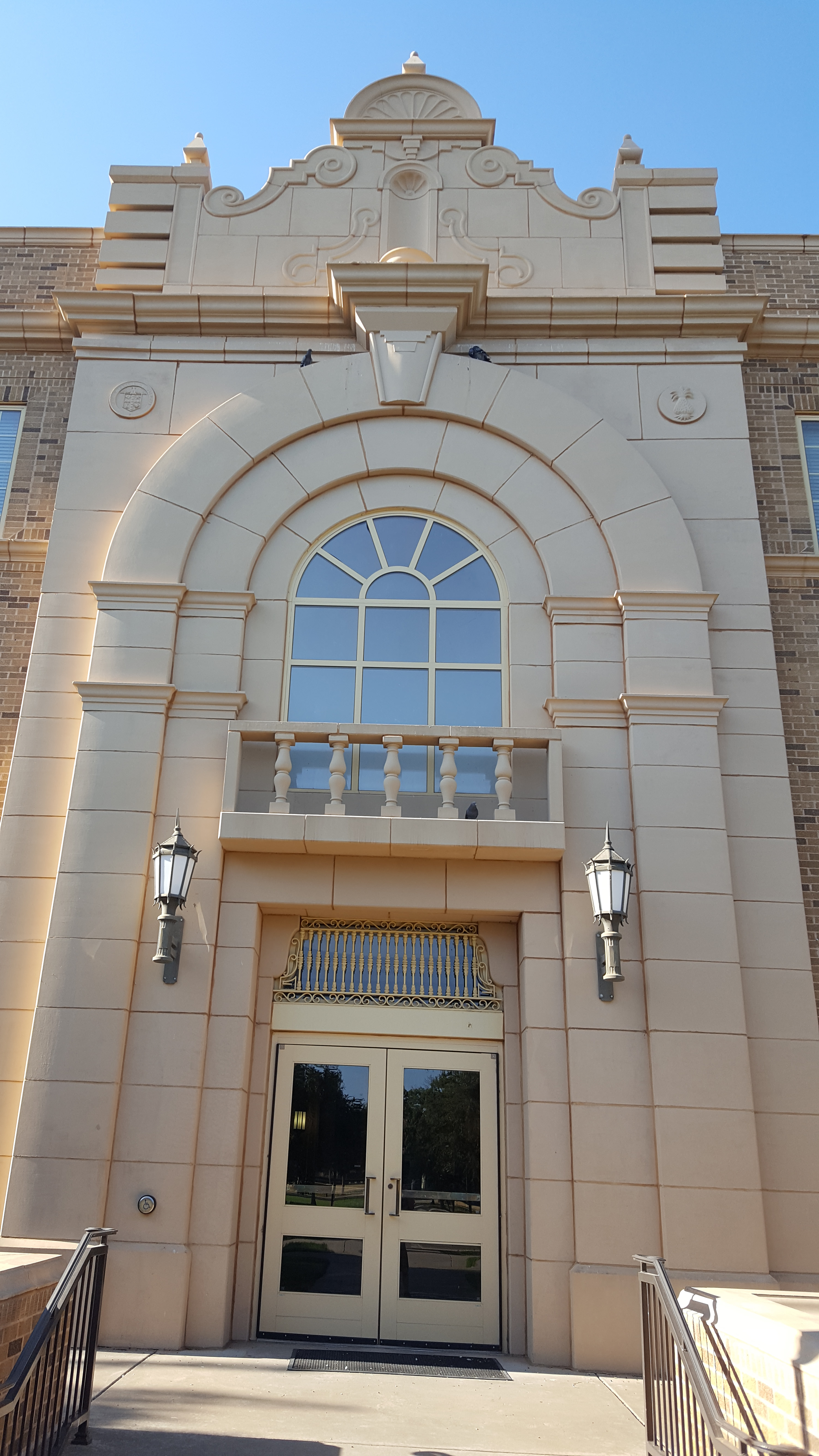
Detail of the main entrance to West Hall in 2019

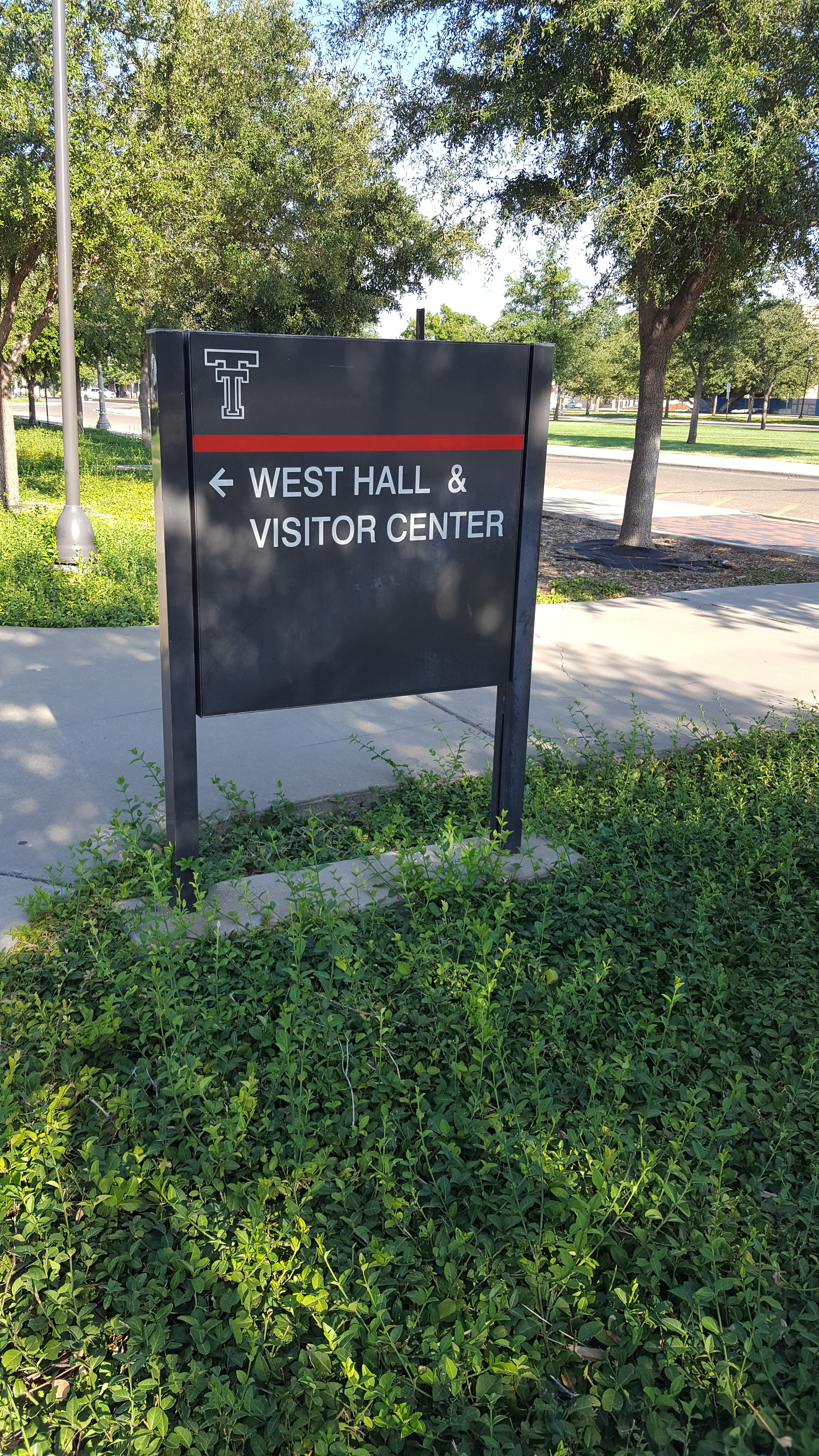
West Hall Sign
