= James Marion West Sr. =

American businessman (1871–1941)

James M. West Sr.
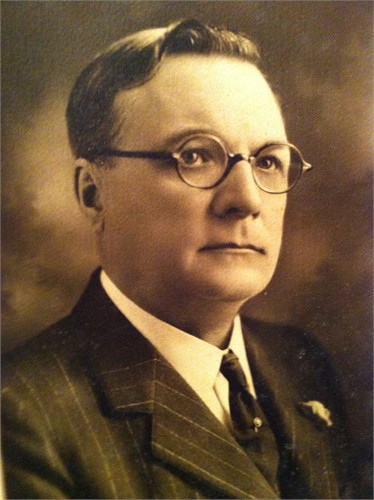
- Born: James Marion West; May 2, 1871; Waynesboro, Mississippi, US
- Died: August 24, 1941 (aged 70); Kansas City, Missouri, US
- Resting place: Forest Park Cemetery, Houston, Texas
- Years active: late 1880s to 1941
- Known for: Oil, lumber, and ranching tycoon
- Spouse: Jessie Gertrude (née Dudley) West
- Children: James Marion West Jr., Wesley West, Mildred West
- Parent(s): Silas W. West, Mattie (née Clark) West
- Relatives: Westley W. West (Brother), Allene West Bogutski (Niece)

James Marion West Sr. (May 2, 1871 – August 24, 1941) was a wealthy Houston, Texas, businessman who substantially influenced the city's development during the early 20th century.

He came to Texas as a boy from Mississippi in 1880. He grew up on a farm in Trinity County where he later built a lumber business. He married Jessie Gertrude (née Dudley) in 1895.

He built a business empire that included ranching, banking, lumber, oil, real estate, and newspaper publishing. He was heavily involved in politics both in Houston and at the state level. He served as an officer and board member for various banks, universities, and other business interests. He later became a publisher of the Dallas Journal and the Austin Tribune in part because of his interest in politics.

== Personal life ==
West was born in Waynesboro, Mississippi, on May 2, 1871, to Silas Wesley and Mattie (née Clark) West. He moved with his family to Texas at the age of nine. His family settled on land in Trinity County and began a life of subsistence farming. Times were not easy and the family struggled financially through his early years. West would leave school early at the age of 13 due to the financial stress his family endured. He would subsequently begin a career that would lead him to become a millionaire many times over by the early 20th Century.

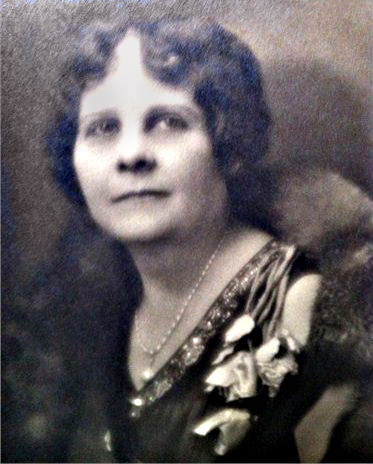
Jessie Gertrude (née Dudley) West

He married a school teacher from Josserand, Texas, named Jessie Gertrude (née Dudley). A quiet individual who enjoyed the outdoors, ranching, and his privacy, West was a tall man of over six feet with trademark West blue eyes and dark black hair that turned gray in his later years. Shrewd, but not callous, he was modest despite his vast wealth. West was a conservative both in his business dealings and in his politics, where he was a noted Republican.

West died on August 24, 1941, while on a business trip to Kansas City. His son Wesley was by his side when he died. He is buried in the Forest Park Cemetery in Houston.

== Business ventures and associations ==
Financial stress on his family forced West to leave school in 1884 at the age of 13 to work as a water boy at the Trinity County Lumber Company in Groveton, TX, owned by Peter Josserand Jr. West saved money from this position, using the funds to later buy a drug store in Groveton where he would work after spending the day at the lumber mill. The store would later burn to the ground, but the experience left in him the desire to run his own company. He eventually went into business with Josserand and subsequently bought the mill outright. Shortly thereafter he began raising longhorn cattle on the side, a business he would also later grow into a veritable empire. From this beginning, West Lumber would grow to more than a two dozen mills across Texas and Louisiana including sites in Saron in Trinity County, the communities of Dayton and Milvid in Liberty County, the towns of Latexo and Lovelady in Houston County, Connell in Jefferson County, the Benford, Corrigan, Onalaska, and Stanley communities in Polk County, and Houston in Harris County. His interests in these mills led him to become a millionaire many times over. A notable business acquisition saw West acquire the competing William Carlisle & Company of Onalaska which included over one billion feet of stumpage, a number of associated saw mills, and a railroad. He acquired the South Texas Lumber Company from Jesse Jones in 1910. Shortly after World War I, West Lumber sawed over 400,000 feet of lumber daily in some 24 mills, while employing over 1,500 people (some 6% of the lumber workforce in Texas at the time).

West remarked frequently that he was a cattleman at heart and he built a fortune in ranching across Texas. He owned multiple ranches in the state including the 48,000 acre Fort Terrett Ranch in Sutton County, the 203,000 acre Longfellow Ranch in Pecos County, the 155,000 acre Chupadero Ranch (purchased in 1932), the Indio Ranch (in Maverick and Webb counties; purchased in 1940), the 175,000 acre Figure 2 Ranch in Hudspeth and Culberson counties, the 30,000 acre West Ranch in Harris County, and the 40,000 West Ranch in Blanco County., West also maintained two ranches in New Mexico including one in Logan, NM. Additional land was leased by his company West Securities as part of the ranching business. All of these fell under the management of The West Cattle Company, later renamed the West-Pyle Cattle Company after West's death when sons James Jr. and Wesley took over the company and ran it with noted cowman Forest Barnett “Buck” Pyle. He was as successful in the cattle business as he was in the lumber industry and increased his wealth with these operations greatly. West was elected to a two-year term as 16th President of the Texas and Southwestern Cattle Raisers Association, but resigned after one year in office. He actively campaigned to have Dolph Briscoe Sr. (father of future Governor Dolph Briscoe Jr. of Uvalde) elected to succeed him. The favor would be returned many years later when Dolph Jr., by then governor of the state, appointed West's daughter-in-law Neva to the Texas Commission on the Arts for a four-year term beginning in 1975.

West ventured into the oil business in the 1920s. He acquired large holdings in the Pierce Junction Field in present-day Houston (which produced nearly 89 million barrels of oil through 1984) and the Thompson Field (part of the Frio Deep-Seated Salt Dome Fields which produced over 2.4 billion barrels through the early 1990s) with his two young sons and friend Hugh Roy Cullen in the late 1920s. He would also develop and run an independent oil company, West Production Company. After oil was discovered on his ranch in present-day Clear Lake City, he sold the ranch to the Humble Oil Company, a forerunner of today's ExxonMobil in 1937 for $8.5 million cash (worth some $139,400,607 in February, 2013 dollars) and a substantial amount of stock.

In 1939, West was appointed by then Governor W. Lee "Pappy" O'Daniel to be Chairman of the Texas Highway Commission (now the Texas Department of Transportation). However, as a Republican, a vocal supporter of failed Republican presidential candidate Alf Landon, and opponent of Franklin D. Roosevelt, West could not garner sufficient support to be confirmed by the Democratically controlled Texas Senate. Feeling the failure to be motivated by politics rather than his ability to do the job, West entered the world of publishing to leverage his political beliefs and might. He bought the Dallas Dispatch-Journal newspaper in 1939, subsequently renaming it the Dallas Journal. He later bought the Austin Tribune newspaper and the KBTC radio station in Austin (later sold by son Wesley to family friends Lyndon and Lady Bird Johnson). He used these outlets in part to lobby against what he viewed as the socialist tendencies of the Roosevelt administration.

He served for years as Chairman of the Houston City Planning Commission, and was also a Director of the Federal Reserve Bank of Dallas.

Upon his death in 1941, his estate was valued at more than $70 million; a figure equivalent to over $1.1 billion in February 2013 dollars.

== Involvement in higher education and charity ==
West was appointed to the Board of Directors (now Board of Regents) of Texas Technological College (Texas Tech University) in 1935 and served in the position from 1935 through 1941, Chairing the Board from 1940 to 1941. West Hall on the Texas Tech campus is named in his honor. West was also a Director of the Southwestern University in Georgetown, Texas. He was a trustee of the Methodist Hospital, Houston, and a steward of Saint Paul's Methodist Church, Houston.

In 1938 he established the West Foundation (now the West Endowment), a Houston-based charity which continues to donate to a variety of causes.

== Homes ==
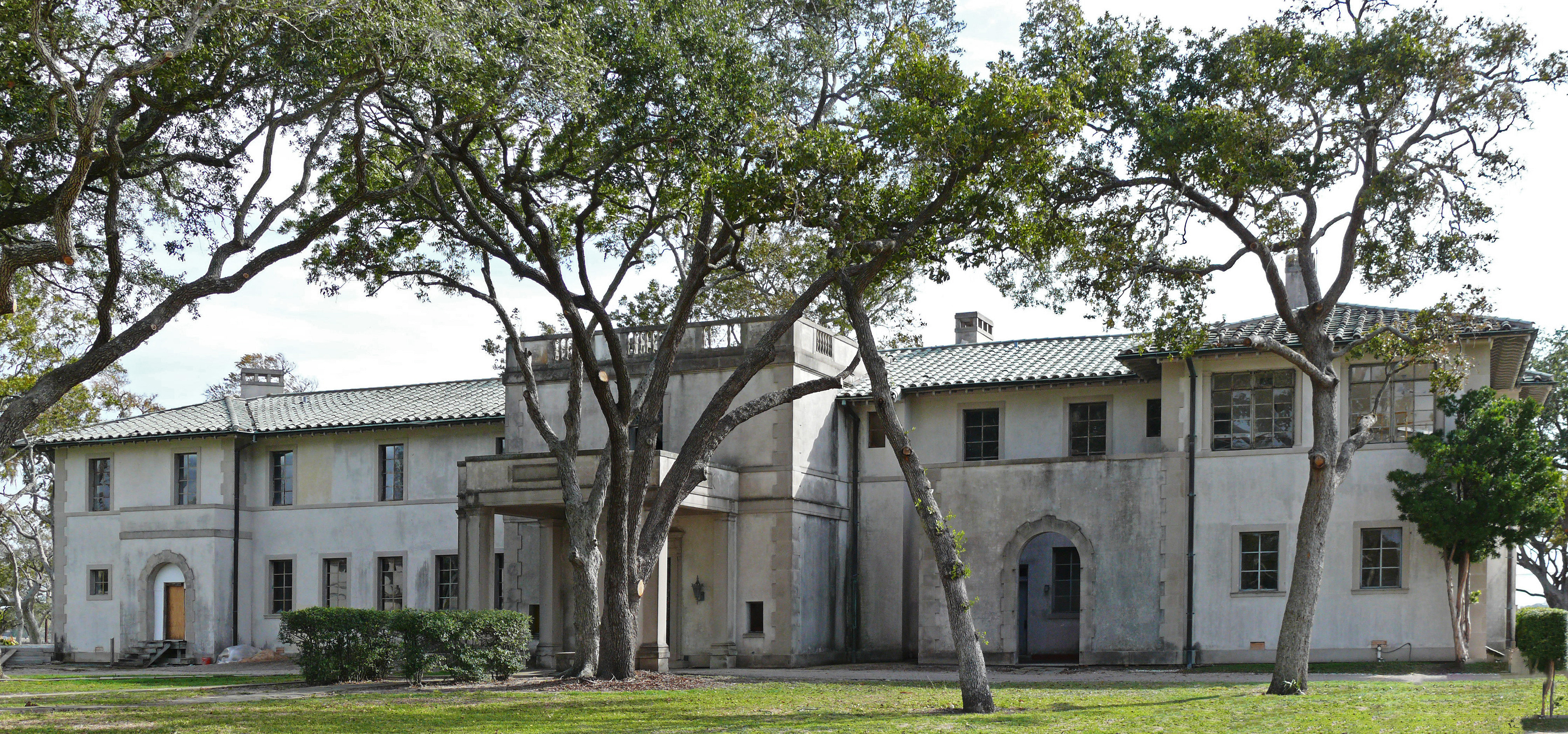
Front of Jim West Mansion - 2012. Cannot be seen from highway.

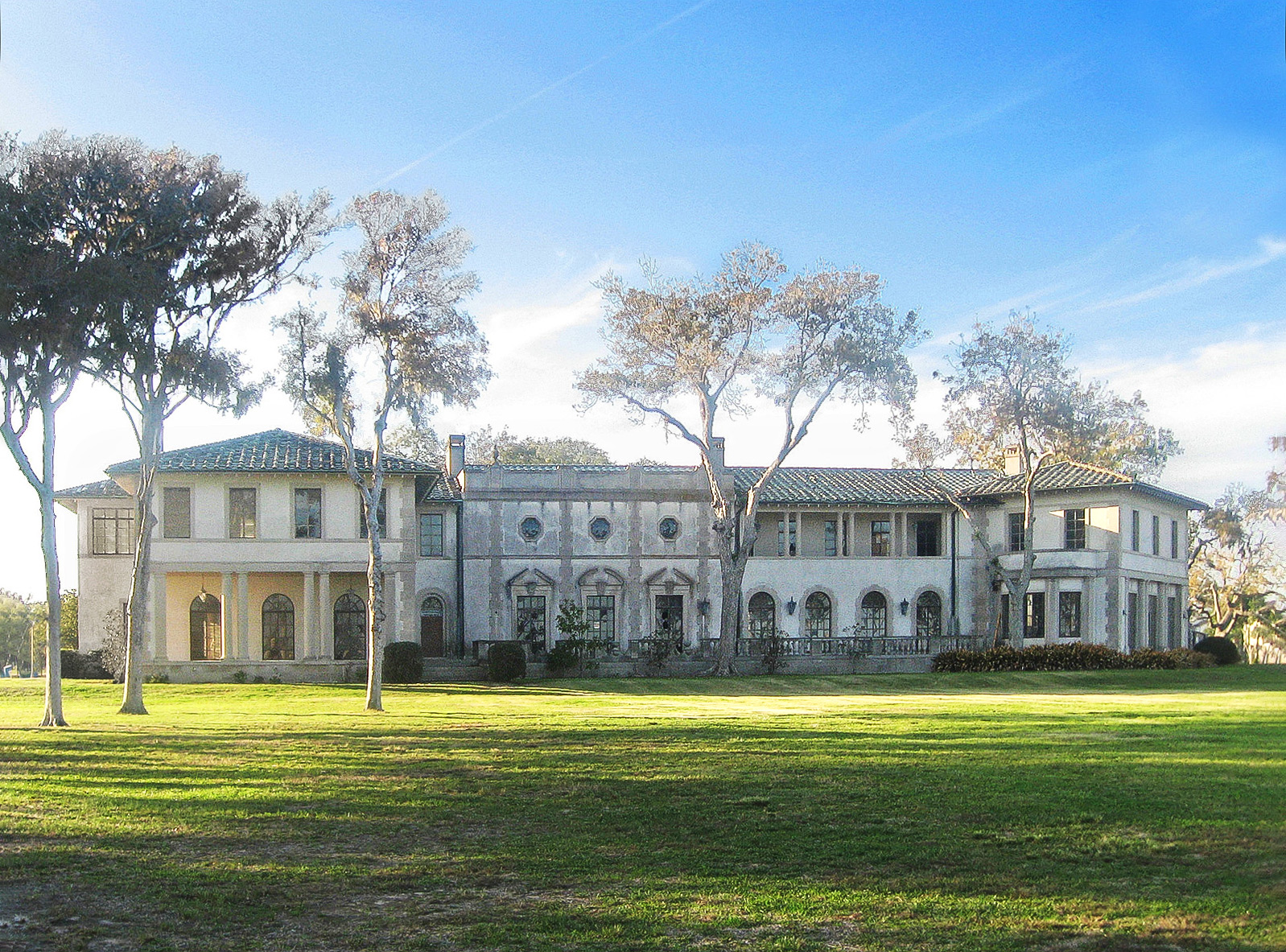
Rear of Jim West Mansion as seen from NASA RD 1

His main home was the West Ranch in the Galveston Bay Area occupying what is now Clear Lake City and NASA's Johnson Space Center. His home there, an Italian Renaissance Revival style mansion of some 17,000 square feet, was one of the largest mansions in the Houston area. Designed by noted Houston architect Joseph Finger, the house was the centerpiece of the 30,000 acre ranch. The home was listed as a Texas Historic Landmark in 1993. West stipulated in his will that it not be used as a residence after his death; subsequently, the mansion has been used by both NASA and the University of Houston. West sold most of the ranch after oil was found on the property to Humble Oil. It was Humble Oil (via the Friendswood Development Company) that later created Clear Lake City.

West Mansion was later owned by Hakeem Olajuwon, used for a time as a showroom, before being demolished in 2019.

The town of Westville, Texas, in Trinity County, originally centered around the sawmill he established with Peter Josserand, was named for him and the West Lumber Company he established there.

== See also ==
- Clear Lake City
- Galveston Bay Area
- Houston
