= Texas Technological College Historic District =

Historic district in Texas, United States

- Texas Technological College; Historic District
- U.S. National Register of Historic Places
- U.S. Historic district
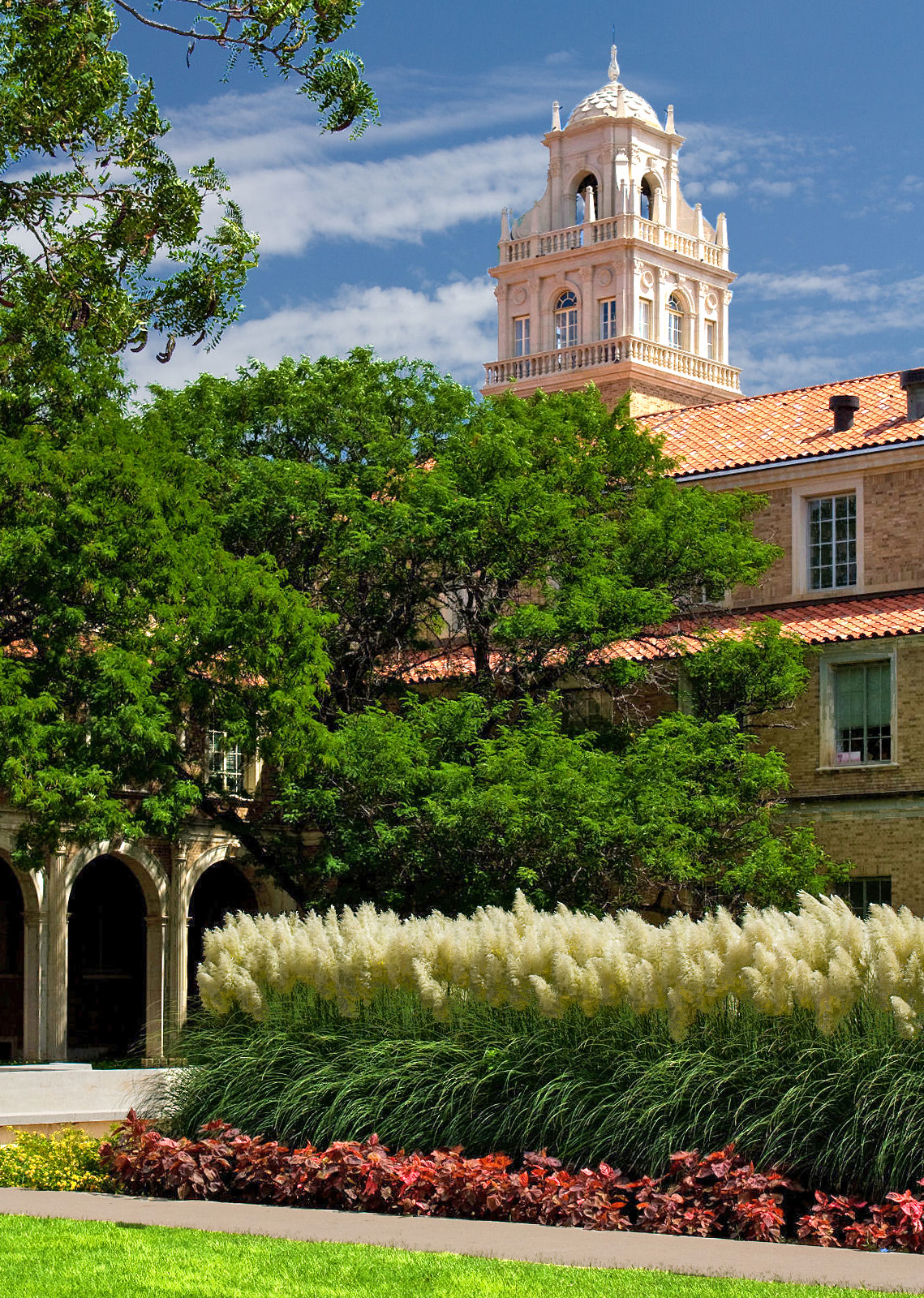
- Administration Building

- Location within Texas Location within the United States
- Location: Roughly bounded by 6th St., University Ave., 19th St., and Flint St., Lubbock, Texas
- Coordinates: 33°35′2″N 101°52′28″W
- Area: 110 acres (45 ha)
- Built: 1924
- Built by: multiple
- Architect: multiple
- Architectural style: Mission/Spanish Revival
- NRHP reference No.: 96000523
- Added to NRHP: May 10, 1996

The Texas Technological College Historic District is a historic district listed on the National Register of Historic Places on the campus of Texas Tech University in Lubbock, Texas. The 110-acre (0.45 km^{2}) district is made up of 27 contributing properties, four non-contributing properties, one contributing structure, one contributing object, and one contributing site.

== Properties ==
- West Hall, built 1934 as "Men’s Dormitory #1"

=== Former buildings ===
Several buildings from the original 1920s construction period have been demolished including the original Bookstore (pre-existing when the campus land was purchased for the college), the 1925 Cafeteria (which became the book store in 1930 and was consumed by 1950s construction enlarging the store), the 1926 Agriculture Building (known as the Speech Building by 1942 and as the Speech Laboratory Theater by 1964, demolished 1983), the 1926 Athletic Field House and Assembly Hall (later known as the Gymnasium, demolished 1984), the 1926 Textile Engineering Annex (later known as Mechanical Engineering Shops), the 1927 Poultry Plant, and several green houses, frame sheds, pens, fences, and other small buildings associated with the agricultural area of campus.

== See also ==
- National Register of Historic Places listings in Lubbock County, Texas
