= Edward A. Thomas Building =

1200 Travis
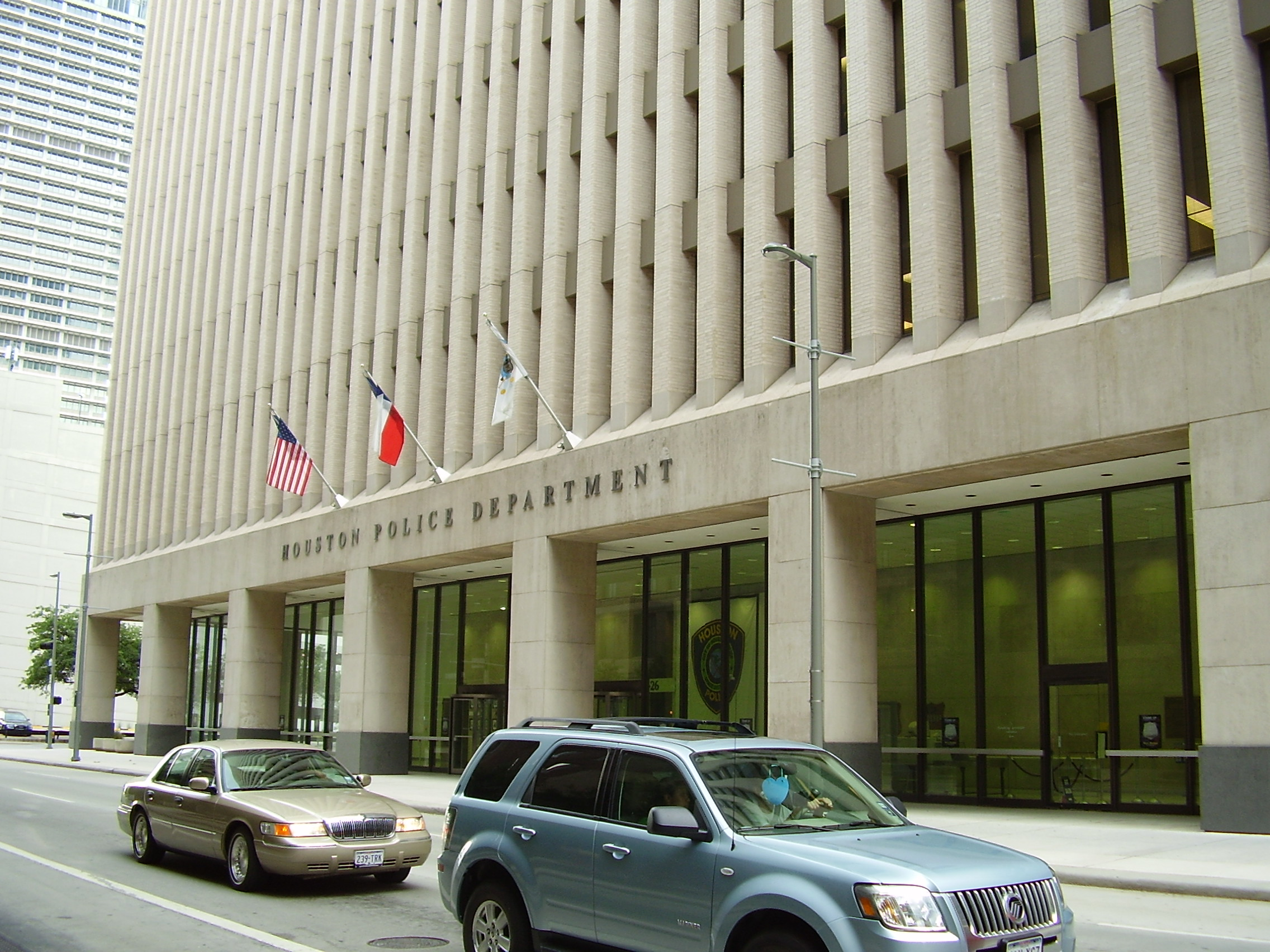
- HPD headquarters in Downtown Houston
- Interactive map of the 1200 Travis area

General information
- Status: Completed
- Type: Office
- Location: 1200 Travis Street, Downtown Houston, Texas
- Coordinates: 29°45.318′N 95°22.053′W
- Completed: 1967
- Owner: City of Houston
- Management: Hines

Height
- Roof: 386 ft (118 m)

Technical details
- Floor count: 28
- Floor area: 16,500 sq ft (1,530 m^{2})

Design and construction
- Architect: Lloyd, Morgan & Jones

The Edward A. Thomas Building, or 1200 Travis, is a 28-story building in Downtown Houston, Texas that is currently occupied by the Houston Police Department as its current headquarters. At one time it was known as the Houston Natural Gas Building. The building houses HPD's administrative and investigative offices.

The building, with 575,000 square feet (53,400 m^{2}) of rentable space, has a typical floor size of 16,500 square feet (1,530 m^{2}). The police department's 40,000-square-foot (3,700 m^{2}), three-floor crime laboratory, a 20,000-square-foot (1,900 m^{2}) fitness center, a 5,000-square-foot (460 m^{2}) voice/data room, a 10,000-square-foot (930 m^{2}) 24-hour emergency tactical command center, and a fingerprinting laboratory are located in the building.

== History ==
The building, originally the Entex Building, was built in 1967. A renovation in 1988 involved the installation of a new central plant. In 1994 the City of Houston bought the building to house the headquarters of the Houston Police Department. In February 1995 the Houston City Council unanimously voted to retain the Hines company as the development manager for the renovation of 1200 Travis. In the 1990s Hercules Engineering and Testing Services received a contract to do testing in the renovated 1200 Travis building. In October 1997 the $21 million renovation was completed.

In 2007 the Houston Police Department announced that it was opening a gift shop inside the building. The Museum, Gift Shop, and officers' memorial opened on May 12.

In 2008 Harold Hurtt, the head of HPD, proposed a plan which would have involved the City of Houston selling 1200 Travis. In regards to a proposed new police headquarters, Hurtt said "It is not a building like 1200 Travis, which was built to be an office building."

In 2011 Mayor of Houston Annise Parker said that the city is considering selling the 1200 Travis facility so that the city will not have to lay off 273 jailers. As of 2012 the facility is for sale.

== Gallery ==
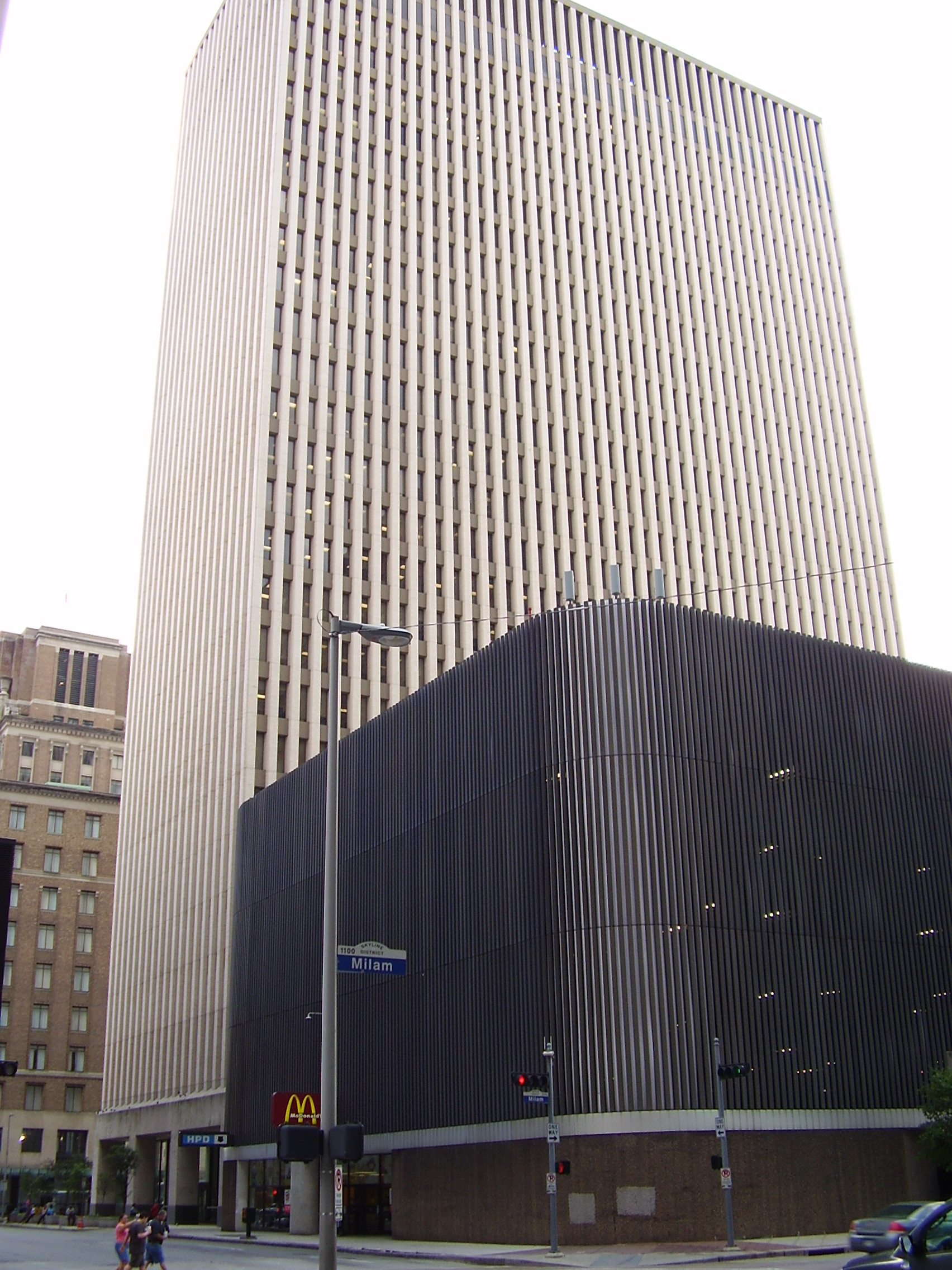
1200 Travis

== See also ==
- List of tallest buildings in Texas
- Architecture of Houston
