= Houston Police Department =

Primary law enforcement agency in Houston

City of Houston Police Department
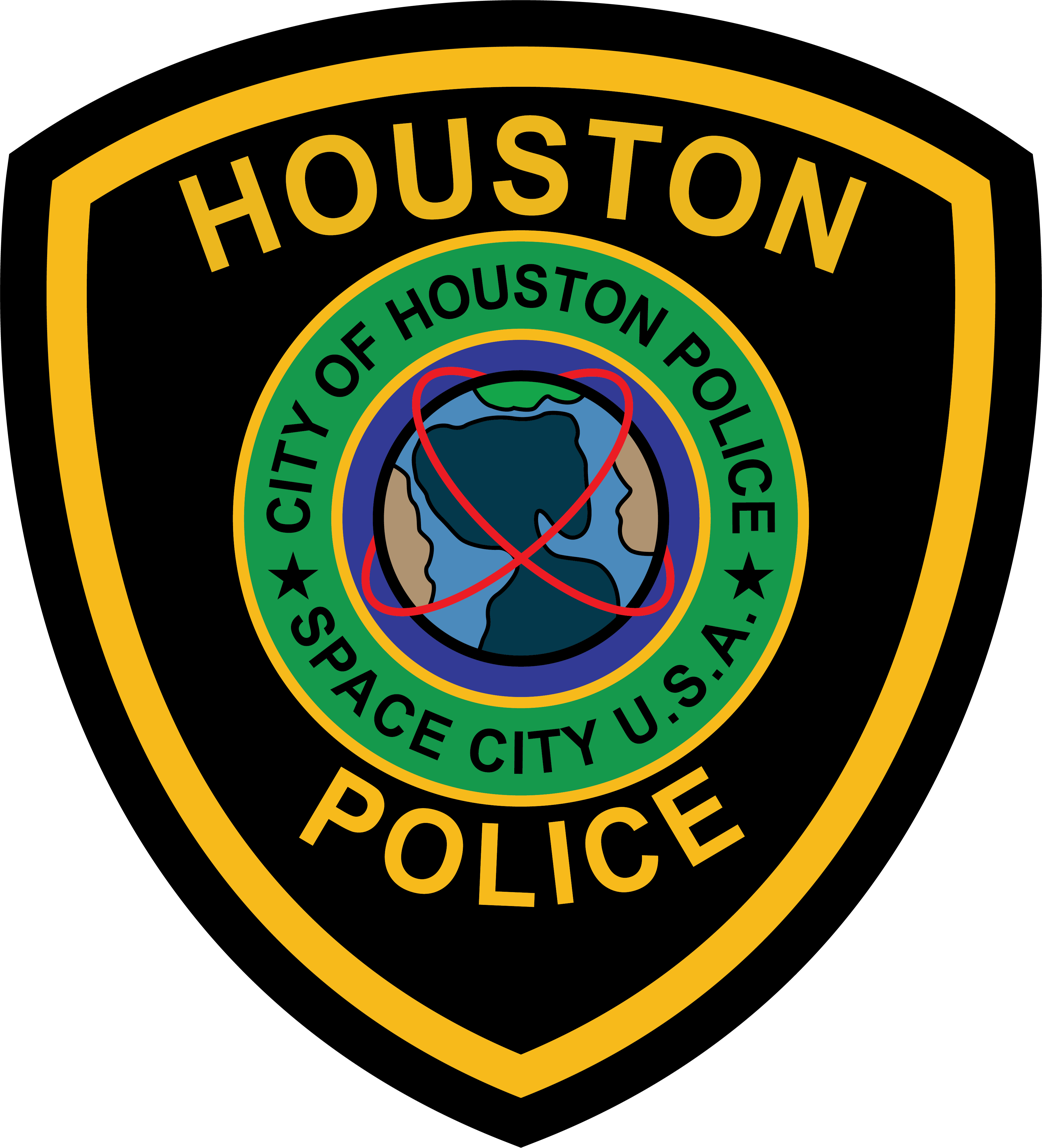
- Patch of the HPD

- Badge of the Houston Police Department
- Common name: Houston Police Department
- Abbreviation: HPD
- Motto: Order through law, justice with mercy

Agency overview
- Formed: 1841; 185 years ago
- Employees: 6,260 (2025)
- Annual budget: $1 billion (2024)

Jurisdictional structure
- Operations jurisdiction: Houston, Texas, U.S.
- Map of City of Houston Police Department's jurisdiction
- Area: 601.7 square miles (1,560 km^{2})
- Population: 2,326,090 (2018)
- General nature: Local civilian police

Operational structure
- Headquarters: 1200 Travis; Downtown Houston
- Police officers: ▼5,260 of 6,405 (2025)
- Unsworn members: 1,029
- Elected officer responsible: John Whitmire, Mayor of Houston
- Agency executives: Jose "J." Noe Diaz, Chief of Police; Thomas Hardin, Executive Chief; Alvaro Guzman Jr., Executive Assistant Chief of Field Operations; Keith Seafous, Executive Assistant Chief of Investigative Operations; Jessica Anderson, Executive Assistant Chief of Strategic Operations

Facilities
- Helicopters: 16 (5 on patrol)

Website
- Official site

The Houston Police Department (HPD) is the primary municipal law enforcement agency serving the city of Houston, Texas, United States, and some surrounding areas. Established in 1841, HPD is one of the oldest law enforcement agencies in Texas. With approximately 5,300 officers and 1,200 civilian support personnel as of 2025 it is the fifth-largest municipal police department, serving the fourth-largest city in the United States. Its headquarters are at 1200 Travis in Downtown Houston.

HPD's jurisdiction often overlaps with several other law enforcement agencies, among them the Harris County Sheriff's Office and the Harris County Constable Precincts. HPD is the largest municipal police department in Texas. The department is organized into three operational commands - Field Operations, Investigative Operations, and Strategic Operations - and divides the city into 15 patrol divisions and 2 airport divisions across 24 districts. Specialized units include SWAT, an Air Support Division consisting of 16 operational aircraft, a Mental Health Division operating one of the leading law enforcement mental health response programs in the nation, dedicated units for combating cybercrime, a dedicated human trafficking unit, and numerous homeland security units. The department operates closely with the City of Houston's Office of Policing Reform and Accountability (OPRA) in the interest of transparency and accountability. The department's annual budget exceeded US$1.07 billion in fiscal year 2025, making HPD one of the highest compensated departments in Texas following a landmark five-year collective bargaining agreement approved in May 2025.

In history, HPD has come under scrutiny for cases of police brutality, corruption, and other well known cases of misconduct.

== History ==
=== Beginnings ===
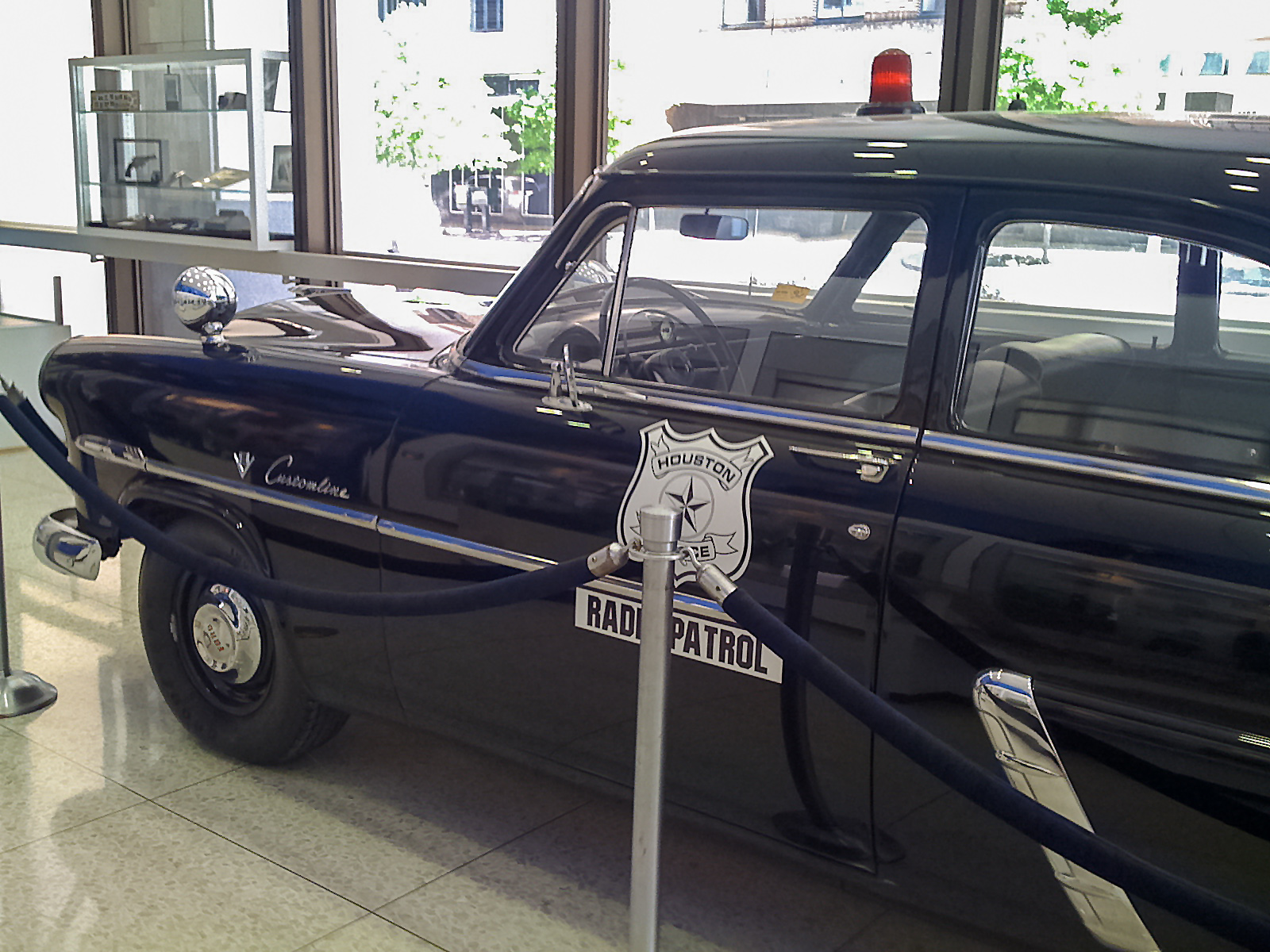
A 1952 patrol car that was used by the HPD. It is now on display at the Houston Police Museum in Downtown Houston

Houston was founded by brothers Augustus and John Kirby Allen in 1836 and incorporated as a city in 1837. As the capital city of the Republic of Texas, it quickly grew, and so did the need for a cohesive law enforcement agency. The Houston Police Department was founded in 1841. The first HPD badge issued bore the number "1."

The early part of the 20th century was a time of enormous growth for both Houston and for the Houston Police Department. Due to growing traffic concerns in downtown Houston, the HPD purchased its first automobile in 1910 and created its first traffic squad during that same year. Eleven years later, in 1921, the HPD installed the city's first traffic light. This traffic light was manually operated until 1927, when automatic traffic lights were installed.

As Houston became a larger metropolis throughout the 1930s and 1940s, the HPD found itself growing and acquiring more technology to keep up with the city's fast pace. The first homicide division was established in 1930. During that same year, the HPD purchased newer weapons to arm their officers: standard issue .44 caliber revolvers and two Thompson submachine guns. In 1939, the department proudly presented its first police academy class. The Houston Police Officers Association (HPOA) was created in 1945. This organization later became the Houston Police Officers Union. The first African American woman police officer on the force, Margie Duty, joined the HPD in 1953, starting in the Juvenile Division.

Some historians have asserted that the HPD enforced an oppressive racial system that targeted blacks for harassment and failed to protect the black community during the Jim Crow era. In Race and the Houston Police Department, author and academic Dwight Watson writes that "HPD zealously enforced racial segregation in Houston".

In 1967, a civil rights protest at Texas Southern University turned into what police say was a riot. One officer was killed and nearly 500 students were arrested. It was as a result of these riots that the still-active Community Relations Division was created within the HPD. In 1970, the Helicopter Patrol Division was created with three leased helicopters. That year also marked the department's first purchase of bulletproof vests for their officers. The HPD's first Special Weapons and Tactics squad (SWAT) was formed in 1975.

=== Modern times ===
In 1982, the Houston Police Department appointed its first African-American chief of police, Lee P. Brown, who succeeded B.K. Johnson. Brown served as chief from 1982 to 1990 and later became the City of Houston's first African-American mayor in 1998. While Brown was considered a successful chief, he also earned the unflattering moniker "Out of Town Brown" for his many lengthy trips away from Houston during his tenure.

Brown's appointment was controversial from the start. Traditional HPD officers frowned upon Brown because he was an outsider from Atlanta, Georgia where he was the police commissioner; to become the police chief in Houston, an officer has to advance through the rank and file although the "good old boy" culture was prevalent.

The HPD paved a new road again in 1990 when Mayor Kathy Whitmire appointed Elizabeth Watson as the first female chief of police. Elizabeth Watson served from 1990 to 1992 and was followed by Sam Nuchia, who served as police chief from 1992 to 1997. In 1997, Clarence O. Bradford was appointed as chief. In 2002, Bradford was indicted and later acquitted of perjury charges, stemming from an incident in which he allegedly lied under oath about cursing fellow officers.

Since 1992, the Houston City Marshal's division, Houston Airport Police, and Houston Park Police were absorbed into HPD. In early 2004, during Mayor Bill White's first term in office, HPD absorbed the Neighborhood Protection division from the City of Houston Planning Department, which was renamed the Neighborhood Protection Corps in 2005. Annise Parker, Mayor White's successor, moved the Neighborhood Protection Corps into the Department of Neighborhoods when the new city division was established in August 2011 - the NPC was renamed as the Inspections and Public Service division of the Department of Neighborhoods.

==== Crime laboratory ====
In November 2002, the CBS local TV station KHOU began broadcasting a multi-part investigation into the accuracy of the HPD Crime Lab's findings. Particularly of interest to the reporters were criminal cases that involved DNA analysis and serological (body fluid) testing. Night after night journalists David Raziq, Anna Werner and Chris Henao presented case after case in which the lab's work was dangerously sloppy or just plain wrong and may have been sending the innocent to prison while letting the guilty go free. As a result of those broadcasts, at the end of the week the Houston Police Department declared they would have a team of independent scientists audit the lab and its procedures. However, the audit's findings were so troublesome that one month later, in mid- December, HPD closed the DNA section of the laboratory. Not only did the audit bolster KHOU's report but also found that samples were contaminated and the lab's files were very poorly maintained. The audit revealed that a section of the lab's roof was leaking into sample-containment areas, lab technicians were seriously undereducated or unqualified for their jobs, samples had been incorrectly tagged, and samples had been contaminated through improper handling. Worse, many people had been convicted and sent to prison based upon the evidence contained in the crime lab. The New York Times asked the question, "Worst Crime Lab in the Country?" in a March 2003 article.

Beginning in early 2003, the HPD Crime Lab began cooperating with outside DNA testing facilities to review criminal cases involving cases or convictions associated with Crime Lab evidence. However, this again came as a result of some prompting investigatory work done by the TV station KHOU. Reporters David Raziq, Anna Werner and Chris Henao got an e-mail from a local mother. She told them that her son, Josiah Sutton, had been tried for rape in 1999 and found guilty based upon HPD Crime Lab testing. He was sentenced to 25 years in prison. So KHOU began to take an intensive look at the Sutton case. Raziq and Werner analyzed the HPD lab's DNA report with the help of DNA expert Bill Thompson of the University of California-Irvine. They found obvious mistakes in the report that the lab should have known about. Not long after that broadcast, the HPD agreed to an immediate retest of the DNA evidence in the Sutton case. Those tests showed the DNA collected in the case did not belong to Sutton. He was released from prison in March 2003 and given a full pardon in 2004.

As a result of the scandal, nine Crime Lab technicians were disciplined with suspensions and one analyst was terminated. However, that analyst was fully reinstated to her previous position in January 2004, less than one month after her December 2003 termination. Many HPD supervisors and Houston residents called for more stringent disciplinary actions against the Crime Lab employees. However, the city panel responsible for disciplining the lab technicians repeatedly resisted these arguments and instead reduced the employees' punishments. Irma Rios was hired in 2003 as Lab Director, replacing Interim Lab Director Frank Fitzpatrick.

In May 2005, the Houston Police Department announced that with much effort and coordination on their part, they had received national accreditation through the American Society of Crime Lab Directors (ASCLD). The ASCLD stated that the lab had met or exceeded standards for accreditation in all areas except DNA. Through independent research and testing, it was determined in January 2006 that of 1,100 samples reviewed, 40% of DNA samples and 23% of blood evidence samples had serious problems. On June 11, 2007, the HPD crime lab reported its DNA section had gained full accreditation from ASCLD.

In the October 6, 2007 The Houston Chronicle published allegations of Employees cheating on an open-book proficiency test.

==== Safe Clear ====
The Safe Clear program was implemented by Mayor Bill White on January 1, 2005, as a joint venture between the City of Houston and the Houston Police Department. The intention of the program was to decrease the freeway accidents and traffic jams that occurred due to stalled drivers. Select tow truck companies across the city were authorized to tow a stalled vehicle as soon as possible after being notified by an HPD officer. Persons having their vehicle towed were provided with a Motorist's Bill of Rights and were required to pay a sum to the City of Houston after the towing had taken place.

The program was initially very unpopular among Houston residents. Frequent complaints were that the program unfairly punished lower-income motorists by enforcing a high towing fee and that the program could potentially damage vehicles that required special tow trucks and equipment to be safely towed away. Other complaints were that stranded motorists did not have an option to choose their own garage. The city and the HPD addressed these concerns with program improvements that provided funds to pay for short tows that removed stalled vehicles from the freeway and then allowed drivers to choose their own garage and tow companies once they were safely off the freeway.

Studies released in February 2006 indicate that Safe Clear has been successful during its fledgling year. There were 1,533 fewer freeway accidents in 2005, a decrease of 10.4% since Safe Clear's implementation.

==== Red light cameras ====
In December 2004, Chief Hurtt stated that he was looking in to installing red light cameras that would automatically ticket drivers that ran red lights. He had previously overseen the installation of cameras in Oxnard, California, where following the installation, side-impact collisions had decreased by 68 percent. In the same month, the Houston City Council unanimously voted for red light camera enforcement. After, Texas State Representative Gary Elkins (R-TX) introduced legislation to deter Houston from amending its city charter for the red light camera rule to be enforced. After this measure failed in the Texas Senate in 2005, four intersections in downtown Houston were used as testbeds for red light camera equipment. When a contract was approved, enforcement went online on September 1, 2006. Those running a red light at one of the 50 locations with cameras are fined a $75 civil fine as opposed to a $225 moving violation which goes against the vehicle operator.

There are fifty intersections with red light cameras in the city with cameras (twenty intersections were added where dual cameras were installed). A majority of them are located at a thoroughfare at a freeway intersection - primarily in the Galleria and southwest Houston. During a Houston City Council meeting on 6.11.08, council member James Rodriguez suggested the installation of an additional 200 cameras.

A voter referendum during the 2010 Texas gubernatorial elections to eliminate red-light cameras passed. The referendum that passed in November 2010 was later invalidated by U.S. District Judge Lynn Hughes June 17, 2011 citing that the referendum violated the city charter despite the contract with American Traffic Solutions, which provided the camera equipment. The cameras were expected to be reactivated after midnight on July 24, 2011; plans were underway to have this judicial ruling heard by the United States Court of Appeals for the Fifth Circuit.

==== Mobility Response Team ====
On July 2, 2007, Mayor Bill White started a new program called the "Mobility Response Team". Staffed by traffic enforcement officers patrol within the loop clearing traffic problems. They report traffic light outages, issue parking citations, help clear and direct traffic around minor accidents, or traffic jams during special events in the area. The duties only involve surface streets and not the freeways and officers use scooters and police cruisers fitted with yellow flashing lights rather than the typical red and blue lights.

This was part of the mayor's plan to improve mobility in city and is the first of its kind in the United States. The city's mobility response team cost $1.8 million a year to operate.

==== Overtime and "Hot Spot" patrol concentration ====
Hurtt spent around $24 million on overtime pay through 2010. That money would continue to bolster an understaffed force as police commanders try to increase their ranks. The overtime that is planned would be about equal to 500,000 police hours of which would help bolster various departments including, vice, Westside patrol and traffic enforcement, among other areas including a new 60-member crime reduction unit that will serve as a citywide tactical squad.

The police chief said the effort will put more officers to work immediately in troubled areas of the city such as Third Ward and Acres Homes, where the bodies of seven women have been found in the past two years.

The crime rate, particularly for violent offenses, since the latter part of 2005, when an influx of hurricane evacuees increased the city's population by more than 100,000, and incidents spiked in certain neighborhoods.

=== Use of violence by the police ===
In 2013 Jo DePrang of the Texas Observer wrote that "According to citizens, community activists, a veteran Houston police officer and even the president of the local police union, the scenario of multiple officers beating an unarmed suspect happens nearly every day." From circa 2007-2013 there were 588 times observers reported what they deemed inappropriate "use of force", and the internal affairs division dismissed 584 of them, with the other four being pursued.

=== Helicopter crash ===
In the morning of May 2, 2020, HPD's helicopter crashed in an apartment complex in north Houston, killing officer Jason Knox and injuring another.

== Organization ==
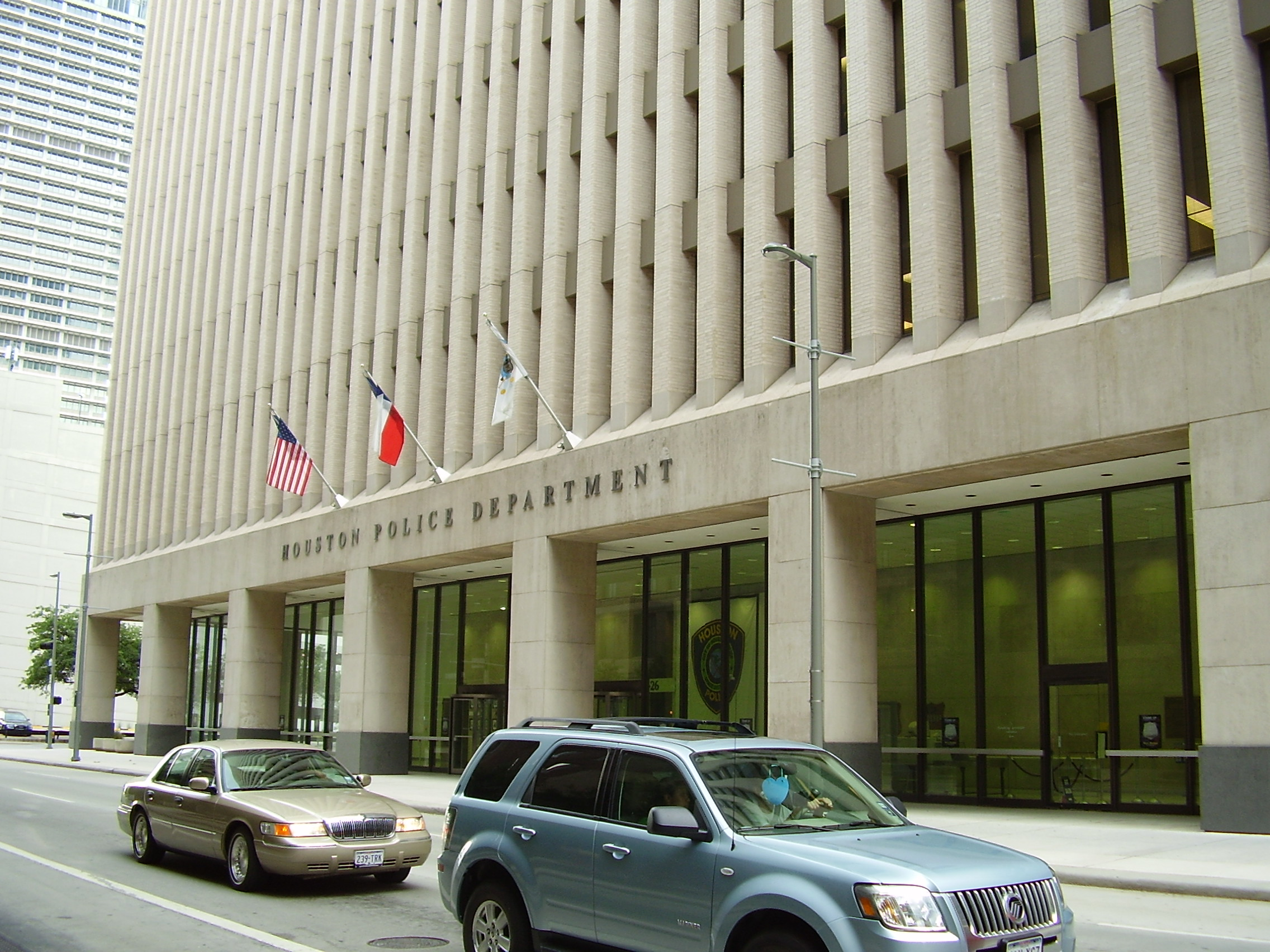
1200 Travis, HPD headquarters in Downtown Houston

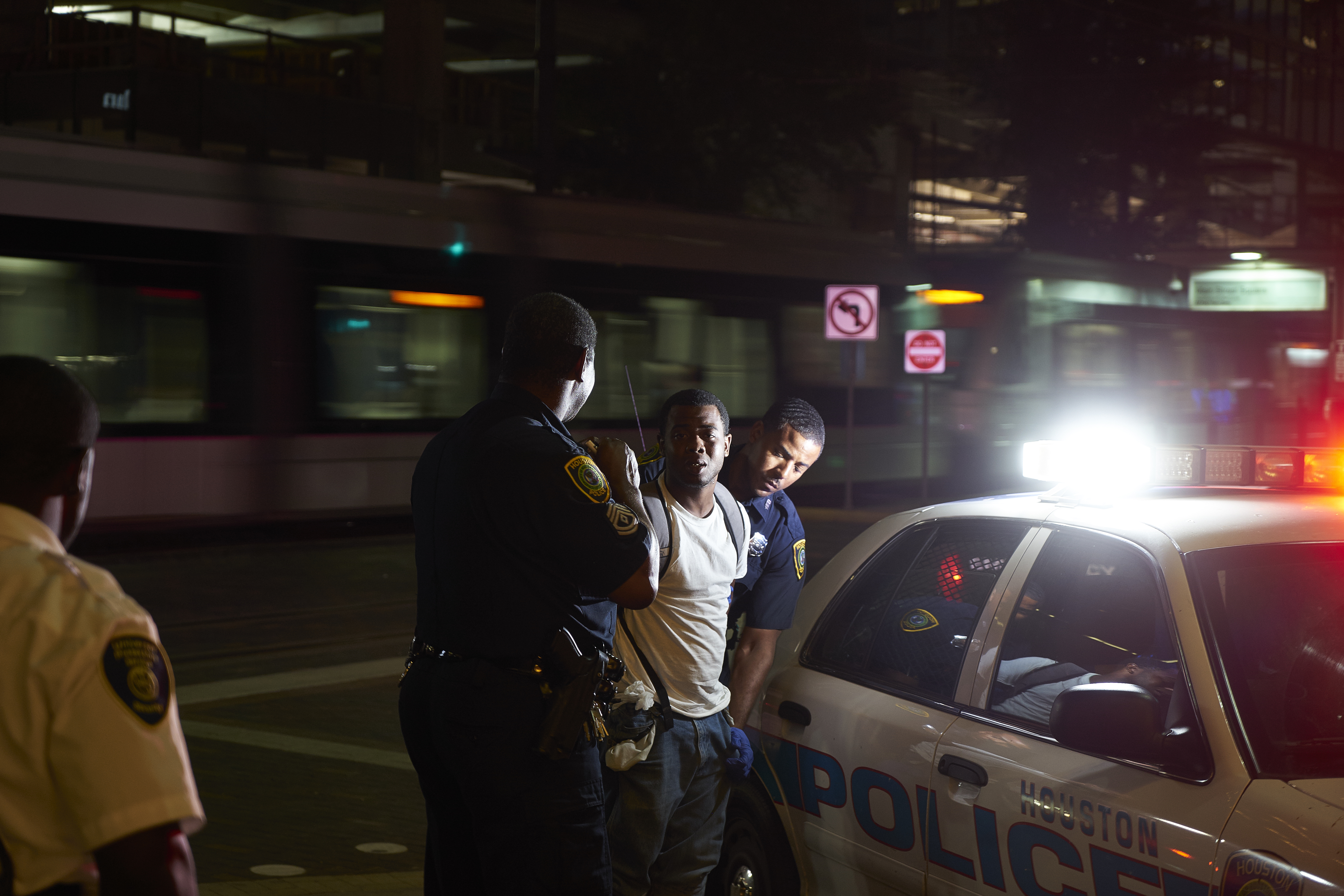
HPD officers arrest a young male on 1200 Main Street in downtown Houston

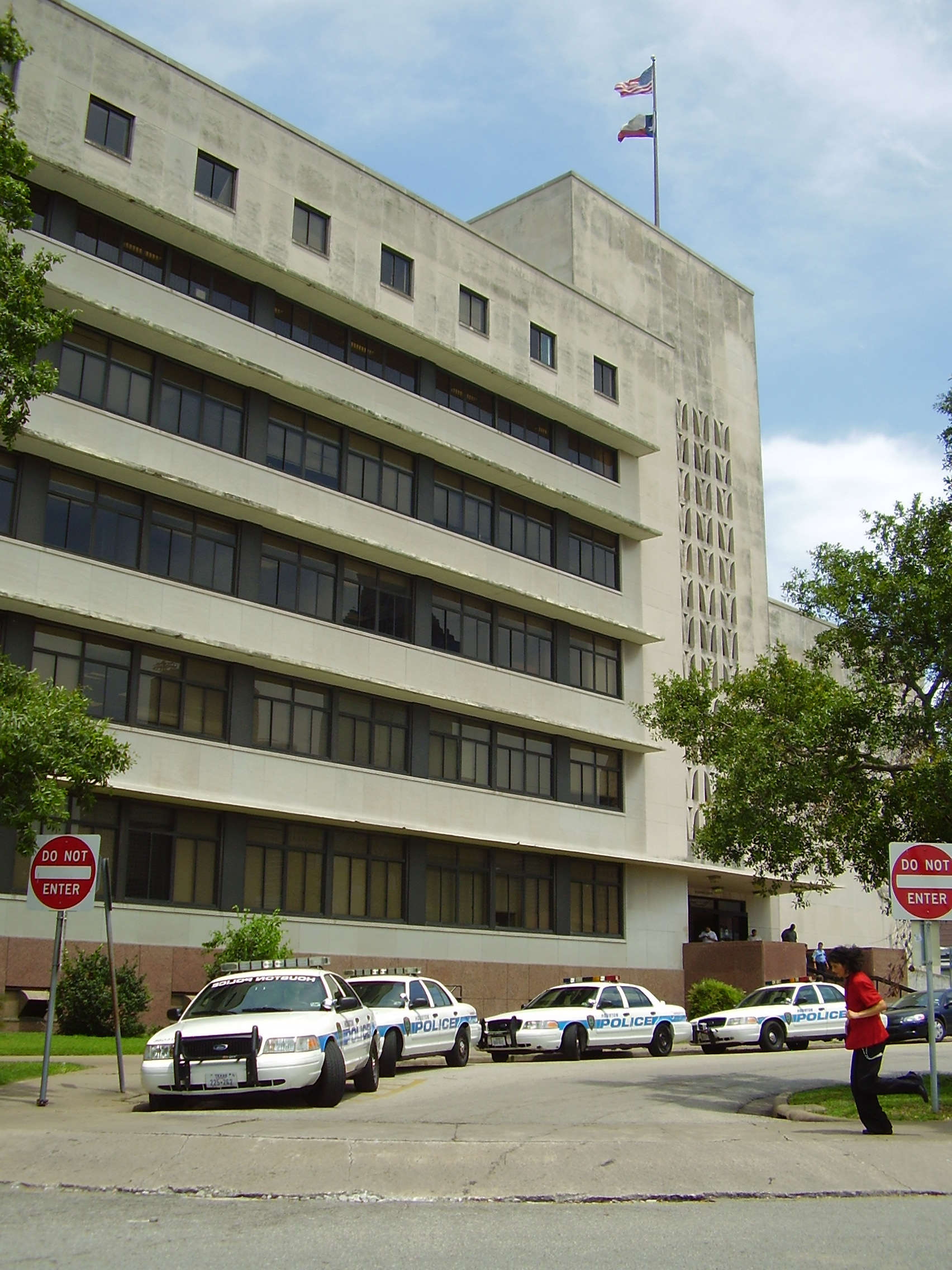
Houston Police Department Central Division

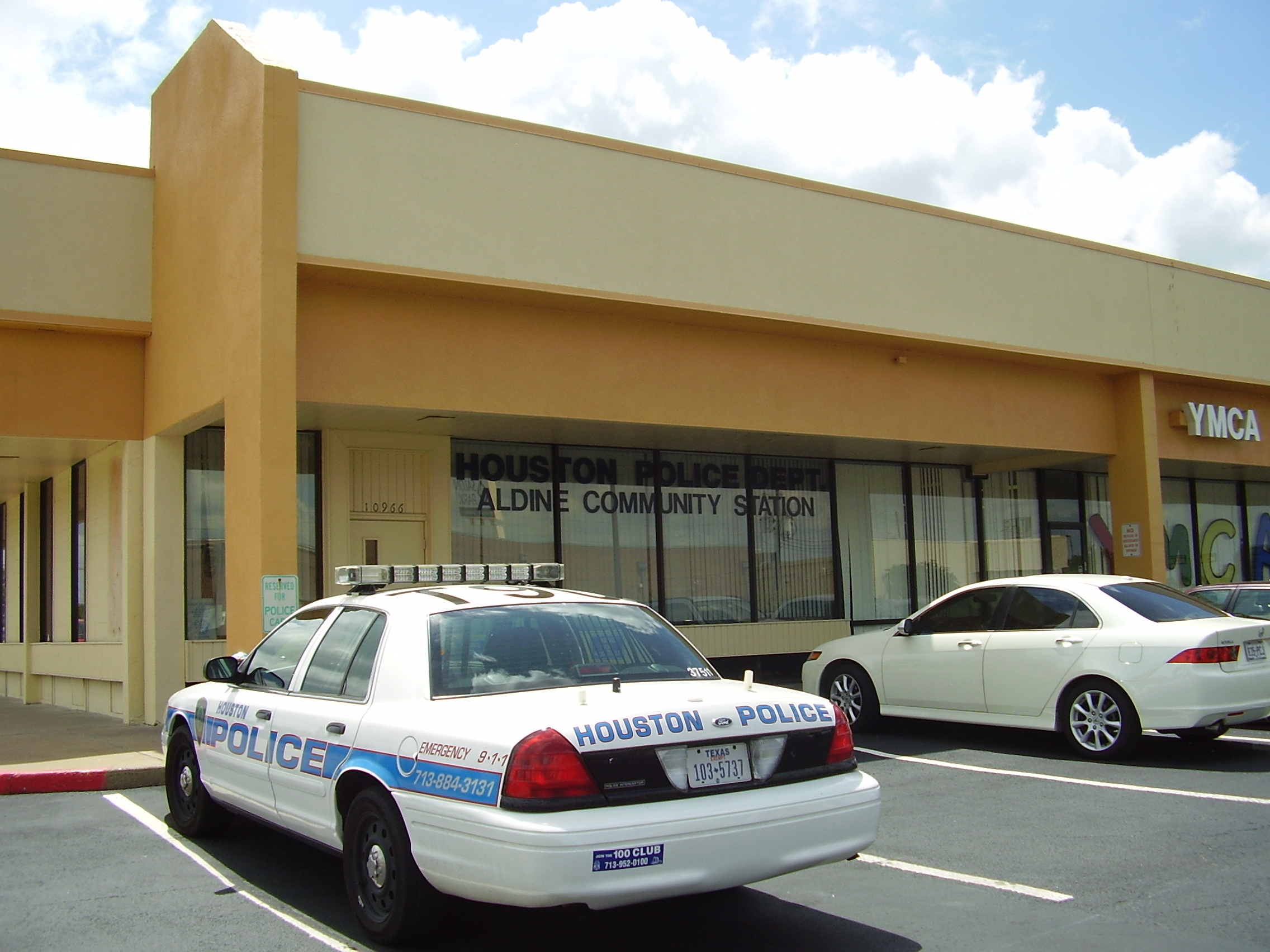
An HPD patrol car parked outside the Aldine Storefront in Greenspoint

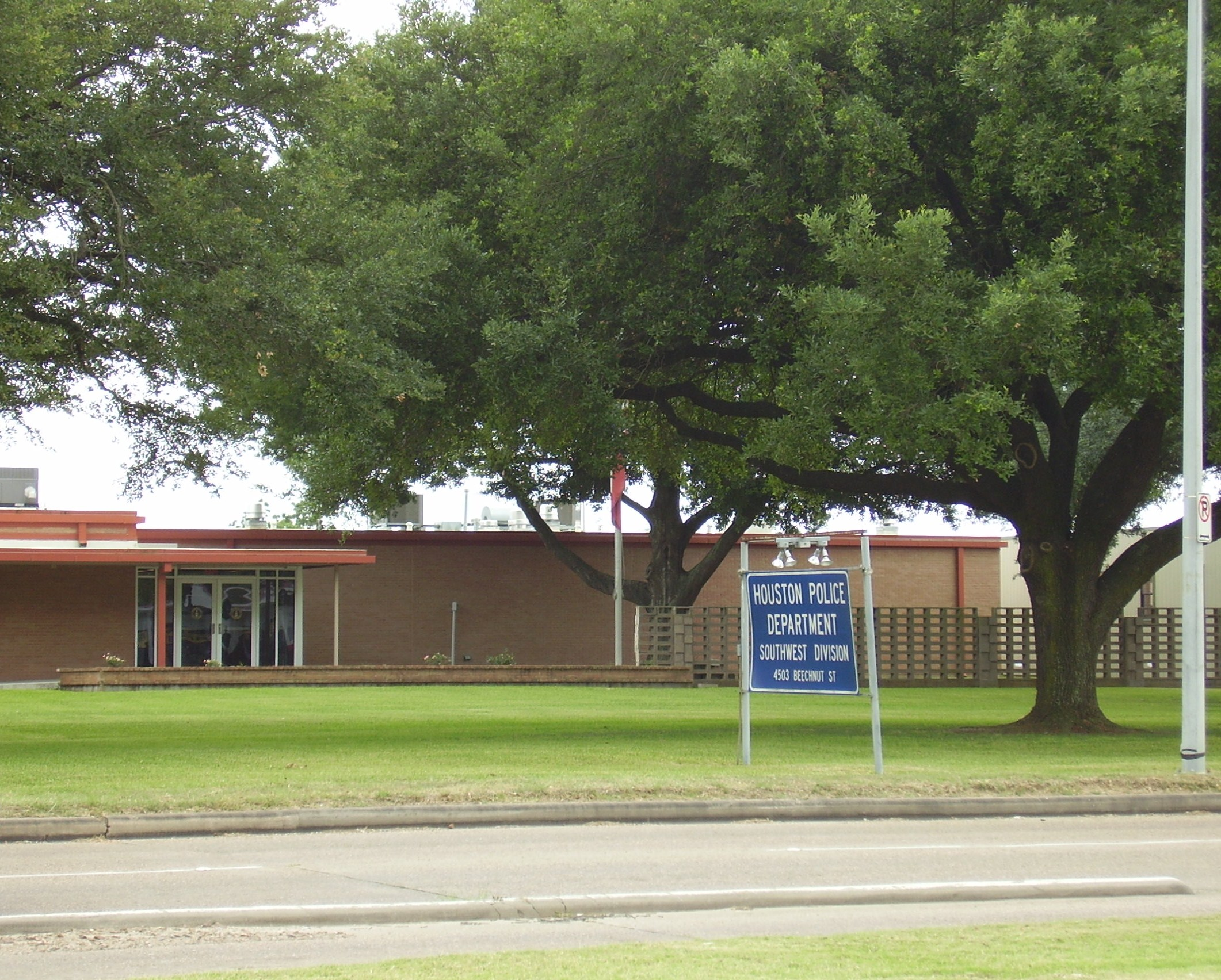
Houston Police Department Southwest Division

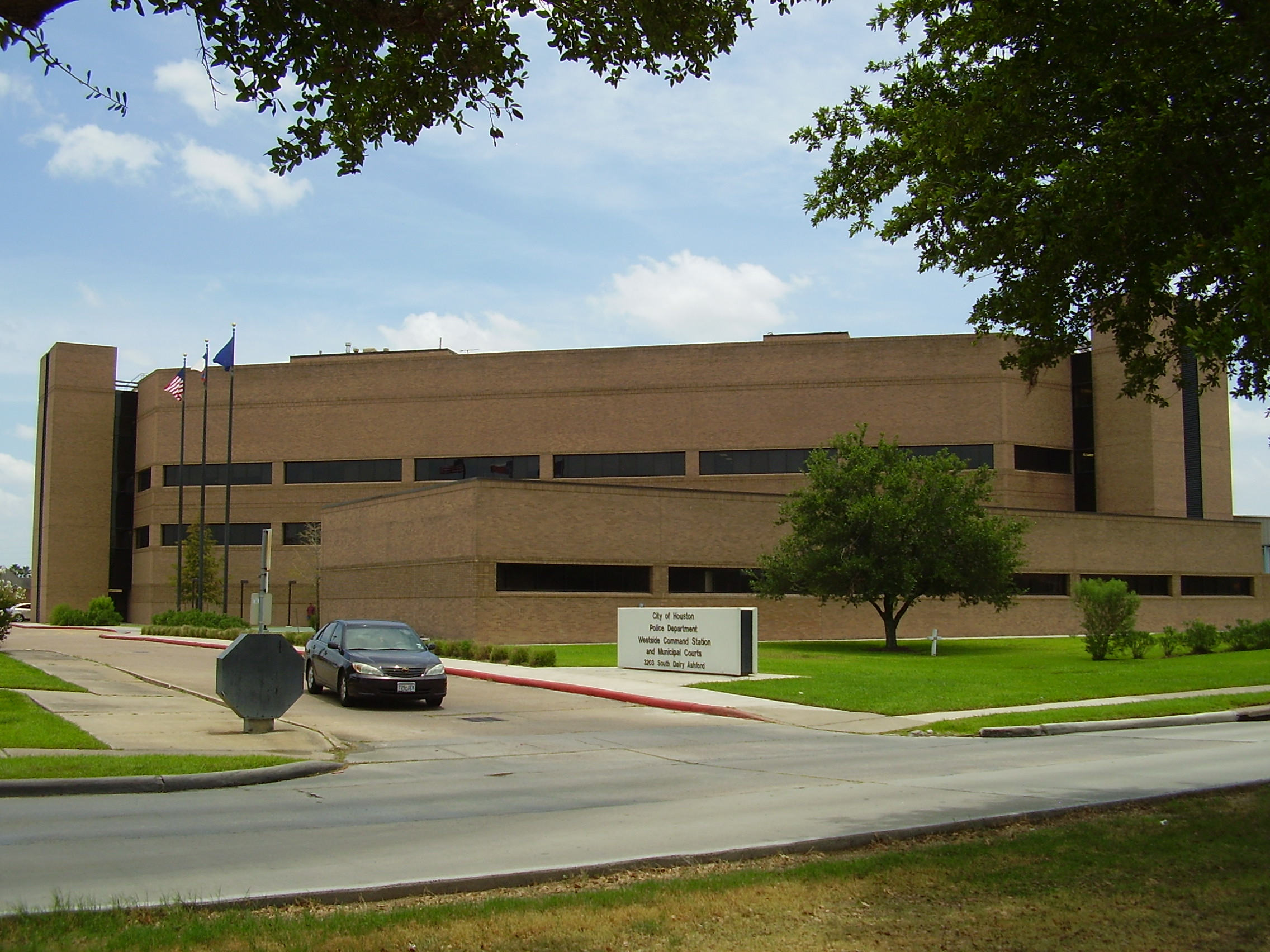
Houston Police Department Westside Division and Municipal Courts

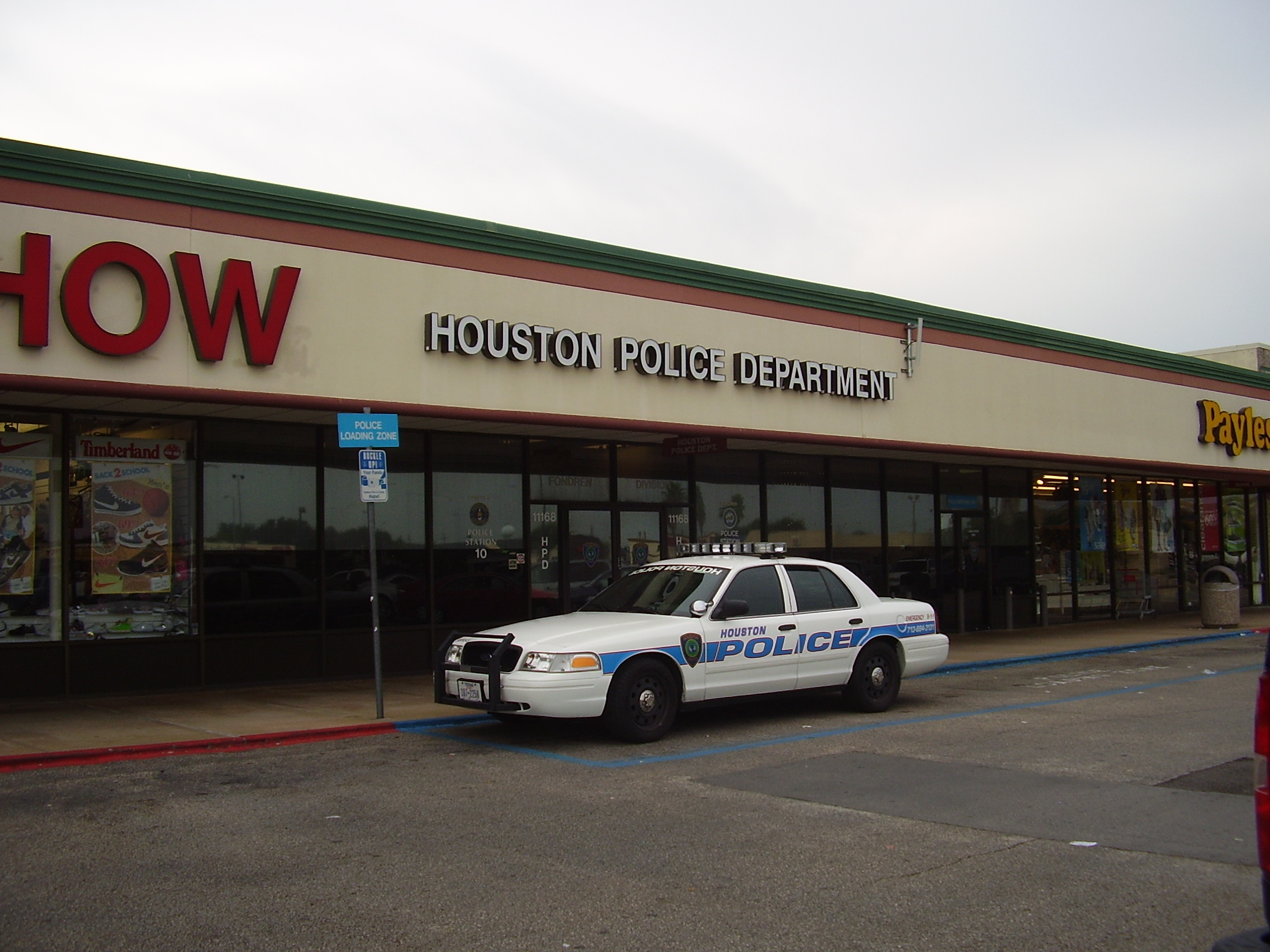
Fondren Division (former station)

The Houston Police Department is headed by a Chief of Police appointed by the mayor and confirmed by the city council. The current Chief of Police is Jose "J." Noe Diaz Jr., appointed by Mayor John Whitmire in August 2024. Under Chief Diaz, the department underwent a significant reorganization that reduced management layers from 11 to 7, creating a new Executive Chief Position currently held by Thomas Hardin, and a Chief of Staff position held by A. L. Colley. The department is structured under three Executive Assistant Chiefs commanding Field Operations, Investigative Operations, and Strategic Operations, all with directly attached commands.

HPD headquarters, known as the Edward A. Thomas Building, is located at 1200 Travis in Downtown Houston. The Central Police Station on 61 Riesner houses the central patrol office, the municipal jail, and the transportation department. The facility at 33 Artesian houses communications and maintenance.

In 2025 all members of the Houston City Council approved the purchase of 1600 Smith, the former headquarters of Continental Airlines, to house HPD and other departments; in turn the municipal government plans to sell 1200 Travis as well as 611 Walker, which houses the public works department.

=== Executive-level offices ===
The department is divided into 3 executive-level offices typically directed by an executive assistant chief. The offices are subdivided into smaller divisions and units which make up the department. All executive assistant chiefs report to the Executive Chief of Police and the Internal Affairs Division.

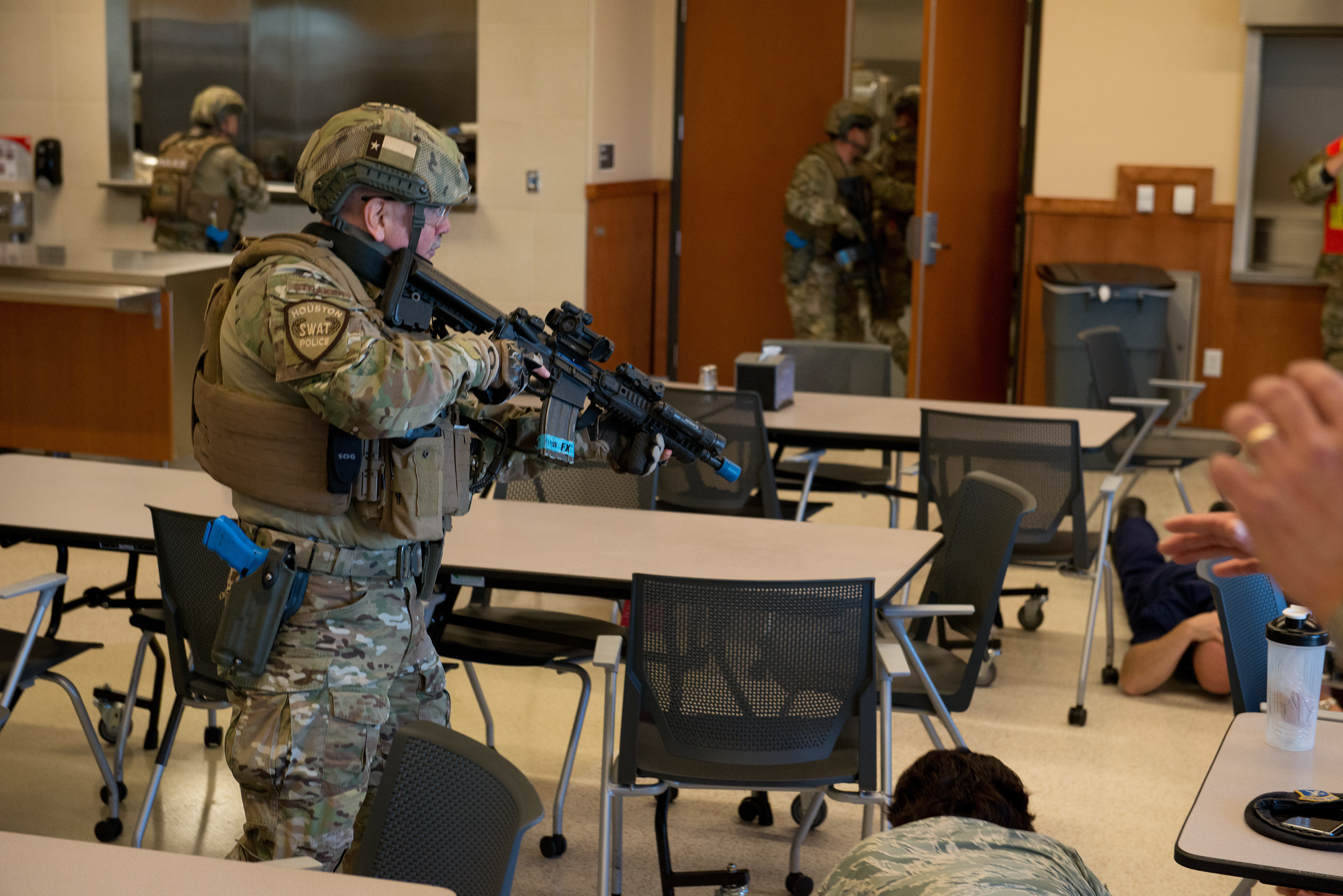
Houston SWAT conducting active shooter exercises in 2016

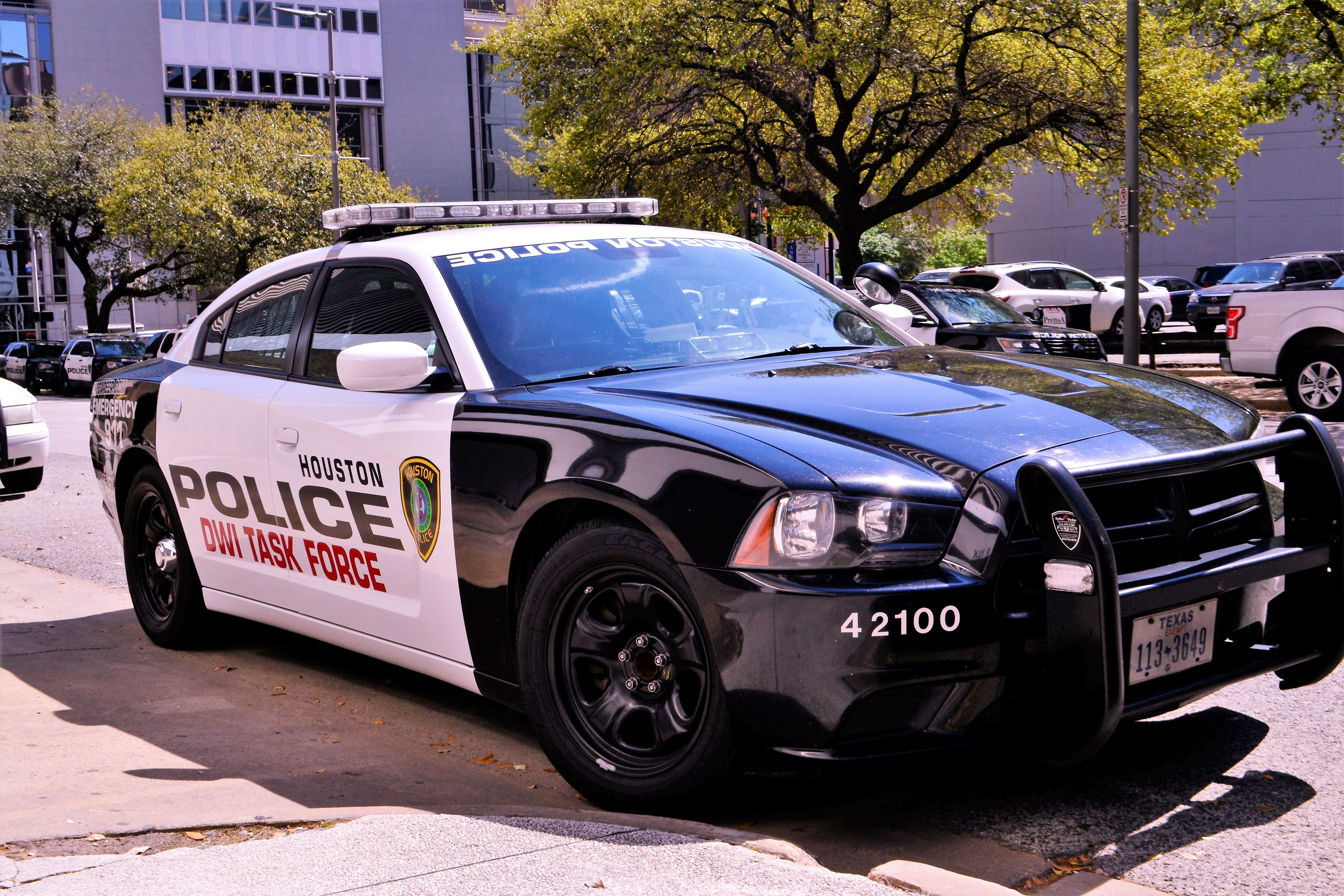
A Dodge Charger of HPD's DWI Task Force

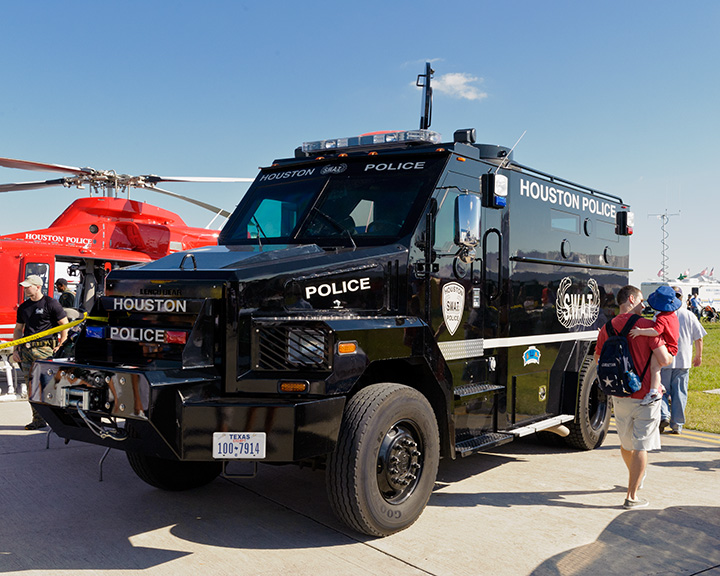
A Lenco BEAR of Houston SWAT

==== Field Operations ====
The Field Operations office oversees most of HPD's uniformed patrol personnel and is the largest of the three executive-level offices. It is responsible for the department's day-to-day law enforcement presence across the city of Houston, including response to calls for service, proactive patrol, and traffic enforcement. Field Operations consists of the patrol region commands, which are further subdivided into patrol divisions that act as the first line of uniformed officers. There are 3 patrol region commands (Patrol Region Command 1, 2, and 3) with each command headed by an assistant chief. These are further divided into 16 patrol divisions and the traffic enforcement division, which are commanded by a captain.

Patrol Region 1 Command	Patrol Region 2 Command	Patrol Region 3 Command
Central Division	Clear Lake Division	Midwest Division
Kingwood Division	Downtown Division	Northwest Division
North Division	Eastside Division	South Gessner Division
North Belt Division	South Central Division	Southwest Division
Northeast Division	Southeast Division	Westside Division
	Traffic Enforcement Division	

===== Traffic Enforcement Division =====
The Traffic Enforcement Division is distinct from other divisions in Field Operations in that it does not follow a divisional patrol structure, but is a working unit within Field Operations that has a specific objective. TED works to protect public safety by enforcing laws designed to curtail unsafe and illegal driving practices across the city of Houston. The division's primary enforcement aims to detect impaired drivers, coordinating the testing of persons arrested for driving while intoxicated, and reducing the amount of traffic fatalities through proactive prevention. TED operates several specialized units such as the DWI Task Force, which detects and apprehends intoxicated drivers; the Mobility Response Team, which responds to and mitigates significant non-freeway congestion caused by unexpected events; the Motorcycle Detail, which maintains the flow of traffic on Houston's freeway systems and enforces traffic laws by means of motorcycle; the Radar Task Force, which works with patrol to conduct speed enforcement by radar to target specific areas; and the Highway Interdiction Unit, which is a squad of uniformed truck enforcement officers and K-9 officers tasked with addressing transportation of narcotics.

==== Investigative Operations ====
The Investigative Operations office oversees HPD's criminal investigations functions and is responsible for the follow-up investigations of crimes reported across the city. It is divided into two commands - Criminal Investigations Command and Special Investigations Command - each headed by an assistant chief. The office handles investigations ranging from homicide and major assaults to narcotics trafficking, gang activity, financial crimes, family violence, and human exploitation.

Criminal Investigations Command	Special Investigations Command
Family Violence Division	Auto Theft Division
Homicide Division	Gang Division
Major Assaults Division	Major Offenders Division
Property & Financial Crimes Division	Narcotics Division
Robbery Division	Special Victims Division
Vehicular Crimes Division	Vice Division

==== Strategic Operations ====
The Strategic Operations office oversees HPD's support, planning, and specialized functions that cut across both Field and Investigative Operations. It encompasses Homeland Security Command, Professional Development Command, and Operational Support Command. These commands contain divisions such as the two airport patrol divisions, the air support division, SWAT, training, and the departments dispatch division. The office is headed by an executive assistant chief and each command is headed by an assistant chief, who oversees numerous captains beneath them.

Homeland Security Command	Professional Development Command	Organizational Support Command
Airport - Hobby Division	Employee Services Division	Command Center Division
Airport - IAH Division	Mental Health Division	Emergency Communications Division
Air Support Division	Psychological Services Division	Property & Detention Division
Criminal Intelligence Division	Recruiting Division	Risk Management Division
Special Operations Division	Training Division	Victim Services Division
Tactical Operations Division		

== Staffing and compensation ==
In 2023, HPD had the highest median overall pay of all City of Houston departments, at $97,792. A 2023 investigation found that the rate of officers per capita is above the national median for large cities, at 2.23 officers per 1,000 residents.

In that same year HPD's proposed general budget exceeded $1 billion. Over 90% of the budget is attributed to staffing. Despite having the fifth largest police department in the country, staffing remains a consistent challenge.

Consistent with other similarly sized metro areas in Texas, Houston allocates more funding to the police departments and municipal courts than other areas in an attempt to address public safety concerns and slow response times.

HPD’s staffing reached its peak in 1998 with 5,453 officers and a staffing ratio of 3.03 officers per 1,000 residents. The following year, HPD reported its first overall rise in crime in nearly a decade with violent crime leading the increase.

== Patrol vehicles ==
As of 2015, the department uses a large number of Ford Crown Victoria Police Interceptors as their main fleet of patrol vehicles which was first ordered in 1996 replacing the Chevrolet Caprice 9C1 (used between 1988 and in patrol service until 2004 (replacing the Ford LTD Crown Victoria squads to 1987 along with M-bodied Mopars (primarily the Plymouth Gran Fury (both R and M platform) last used in 1989)). They have Ford Crown Victoria Police Interceptor models from dating from 1999 to 2011. Since Ford no longer produces the "crown Vic" (procurement of the Crown Vic ended in April 2011 when the orders were filled), The department has chosen to phase in the Chevy Tahoe PPV and Ford Police Interceptor Utility (Explorer) as the successor to the Ford Crown Victoria Police Interceptor. The department is continuing to test new Chevy Caprice PPV models and Ford Taurus Interceptors (including the fifth-generation Explorer) as well - the test mules as of 2015 have been integrated into the mainstream vehicle fleet. It also uses pickup trucks from the Big Three, such as the Chevrolet Colorado, Ford F150, and Dodge Ram for their Truck Enforcement Unit. There is also a small fleet of Dodge Chargers and Chevrolet Camaros, which are mainly used as "stealth traffic patrol vehicles" (which is part of the Traffic Enforcement division). The stealth vehicles are plain white police cars with a slicktop roof and gray, reflective "HOUSTON POLICE" graphics on the side as well as on the front bumper, and hidden emergency lights that are driven by uniformed officers. The Ford Crown Victoria Police Interceptor is also used in this manner - as of late 2011 the stealth patrol vehicles are now painted black. The stealth squads have been supplemented with 14 Ford Taurus Police Interceptors in early 2014 (painted black). Solo (motorcycle) officers use Harley-Davidson motorcycles. The patrol vehicle livery, painted white with blue lettered graphics dating back to 1999 (which replaced the Columbia Blue livery last used in 1998 and retired a decade later), is being phased out for a black and white color scheme where 100 vehicles are painted from $60,000 earmarked from asset forfeiture funds (under HPD policy the previous livery is still used in service until official retirement). HPD squads are usually retired when the vehicle reaches 100,000 miles (they are not reassigned to reserve or secondary duty as with the Austin or San Antonio PD after 80,000 miles) - some squads dating over 10 model years old which are no longer used for patrol duty are usually reassigned either as bait squads (HPD will park an unmanned squad in a high crime area or illegal dumping site) or the Mobility Response Division - the older HPD fleet used by Mobility Response have been retired and replaced with Ford F150 extended cab pickup trucks from the Truck Enforcement Unit. Around 2016 the Houston Chronicle revealed that some of the older squads are still in service but the breakdown rate has increased - a 100,000 mile marked squad (or 120,000 mile unmarked vehicle) has the life expectancy of an automobile with 300,000 miles with regular maintenance. At the time HPD ordered 50 new Ford Police Interceptor Utilities for the command staff but not the mainstream vehicle fleet (the department has procured newer vehicles but the budget crunch has taken in a few new orders whilst the older squads are still operational. A budget crunch in major Texas cities is partly to blame where municipal budgets are usually slashed including priority spending for first responders. Most modern HPD Patrol cars today are Blue and white saying " HOUSTON POLICE" on the side. Newer models use a mixture of black and white paint now with 911 EMERGENCY listed on the rear side of the car or truck.

=== High-speed chases ===
In 2006, after a two-hour chase reaching up to 100 mph and traveling through two counties, HPD revealed that they had chosen not to create a more restrictive chase policy.

A 2023 Houston Chronicle investigation found that high-speed chases by HPD officers rose significantly between 2018 and 2022, leaving hundreds of bystanders injured or dead. At least 240 bystanders were injured or killed during the five-year period as a result of these chases. Chases of these kinds have increased by 47% in the Houston and surrounding areas which out paces national trends. According to the investigation HPD pursued more high-speed chases than Los Angeles; more than Chicago; and more than the next three largest Texas cities after Houston (San Antonio, Dallas, and Austin) combined. The investigation also found that more than eighty percent of the pursuits were done in Black and or Latino communities and were in pursuit of Black and or Brown people.

== Air support ==
The Houston Police Helicopter Division celebrated its 40th anniversary in 2010. The unit was formed with three leased Schweizer-Hughes 269B helicopters and has flown almost exclusively Schweizer or McDonnell Douglas helicopters. With 16 helicopters, the division is the third largest air support unit in the United States after the Los Angeles Police Department and Los Angeles County Sheriff's Department. In 2008 the department acquired new MD500E helicopters. The department also has Schweizer 300 helicopters for training.

The helicopter division patrols about a 700-square-mile (1,800 km^{2}) area. HPD has two helicopters in the air for up to 21 hours a day. All pilots and tactical flight officers are sworn Houston police officers.

== Weapons ==
Most Houston police officers now carry SIG Sauer P229, SIG Sauer P226, SIG Sauer P220, Glock 22, Glock 23 or the Smith & Wesson M&P40 .40 (S&W) caliber semi-automatic handguns. They are also armed with TASER X26 tasers. Tenured officers whose handguns are "grandfathered in" are still allowed to carry their weapons after the mandated .40 (S&W) requirement. This allows some officers to still carry .38 Special, .357 Magnum, .44 Magnum, and .45 Colt revolvers. Chief Charles McClelland while chief, carried a Colt 1911 Mk. IV Government Model as his sidearm. Officers are also allowed to carry an AR-15 rifle, Ruger Mini-14 rifle, Remington 870 shotgun, Benelli M1 Super 90 shotgun and M2 Super 90 shotgun. The SWAT unit uses several kinds of automatic weapons, and was the first local law enforcement agency in the United States to adopt the FN P90 Personal Defense Weapon. Former Chief Art Acevedo carried a Smith & Wesson M&P and it is also the standard sidearm of the Austin Police Department from which he came.

As of November 2013, HPD has allowed officers to carry pistols chambered in .45 ACP. The Glock 21, SIG Sauer P227, and Smith & Wesson M&P 45 are approved sidearms for uniformed officers. Plainclothes officers may carry the Glock 30 and Smith & Wesson M&P 45c. Also in 2013, HPD began to issue the TASER X2 in place of the TASER X26.

As of September 2015, M1911 pistols in 9mm, .40 S&W, and .45 ACP are authorized for uniformed officers as well as 9mm and .45 ACP versions of all previously authorized pistols. Plainclothes officers are now authorized to carry the Glock 43 or Smith & Wesson M&P Shield as their primary weapon.

As of January 2016, the SIG Sauer P320 in 9mm, .40 S&W, and .45 ACP is approved for uniformed officers to carry. Also, EOTech electronic optical sights have been removed from the list of red dot sights that are allowed on patrol rifles. However, Aimpoint electronic optical sights are still allowed.

Officers graduating from Cadet Class 231 or later are only authorized to carry the SIG Sauer P320, the Glock 17, or the Smith & Wesson M&P in 9mm as their primary weapon while in uniform.

== Ranks ==
These are the current ranks of the Houston Police Department:

Rank	Insignia
Chief	
Executive Chief	
Executive Assistant Chief	
Assistant Chief	
Captain	
Lieutenant	
Sergeant	
Senior Police Officer	
Police Officer	N/A

Those with the rank of sergeant or above are supervisors and are issued gold badges whereas officers are issued silver badges.

Lieutenants and above may also be referred to as commanders. For example, they hold position titles including "shift commander", "night commander", "division commander", etc. They are also exempt employees under the Fair Labor Standards Act due to their managerial responsibilities.

After 12 years of HPD service and obtaining a TCOLE Master Peace Officer certification, an officer becomes a senior officer. This rank was created in 2001.

Promotion to sergeant through captain all occur via a civil service formula that factors into account performance on the written examination for the respective rank, assessment score, years of service, and level of higher education or 4 years of military service. Officers are eligible to take the sergeant's promotion exam after 5 years of service. Sergeants and lieutenants are eligible to take the promotion exam of the next higher rank after 2 years of service in their current rank. Candidates for lieutenant must hold at least 65 college hours or an associate degree. Candidates for the rank of captain must hold at least a bachelor's degree.

Assistant chiefs and executive assistant chiefs are appointed by the chief with the approval of the mayor. Such individuals must hold at least a master's degree and have 5 years of HPD service.

It is not required to move through every rank below to achieve a higher rank. For example, many officers promote directly to sergeant without ever being senior officers. Also, many assistant chiefs are promoted directly from the rank of lieutenant. Councilman C.O. Bradford was promoted to assistant chief from the rank of sergeant. Jack Heard was promoted to chief from the rank of sergeant. It is entirely possible to become chief as an outsider such as in the case of Lee Brown, who went on to become mayor, and Harold Hurtt.

Defunct ranks include detective, commissioner, commander, inspector, and deputy chief. Inspector fell under assistant chief and resided directly above captain, until the rank retired in 1978. In the mid-1980s, all active duty detectives were reclassified to sergeants. Originally, officers could choose to promote to detective (investigator) or sergeant (supervisor) which were both immediately below lieutenant.

In 2018, the rank of captain was converted to commander with a change of rank insignia from double gold bars to one gold star. On January 20, 2025, the rank of commander was converted back to captain.

George Seber was promoted to assistant chief in either 1953 or 1954 and was second in command of the department. However, that rank ended when he left in 1969. Inspectors were then the second highest ranking and Chief Pappy Bond converted that rank to deputy chief. After the rank of assistant chief was re-instituted in the mid-1970s, the deputy chief rank was third highest for a time. Circa 1990, the rank of deputy chief was abolished. In 1998, the executive assistant chief rank was created, making it the second highest rank.

Supervisors may also be appointed under certain circumstances to act in the next higher rank during an absence from duty of their supervisor. For example, a patrol sergeant might be appointed as the acting lieutenant (shift commander) if there would be no other lieutenants on duty within that division. Per policy, officers cannot be appointed as acting sergeants (supervisors).

== Fallen officers ==
Since the establishment of the Houston Police Department, 119 officers have died in the line of duty. The following list also contains officers from the Houston Airport Police Department and the Houston City Marshal's Office, which were merged into HPD.

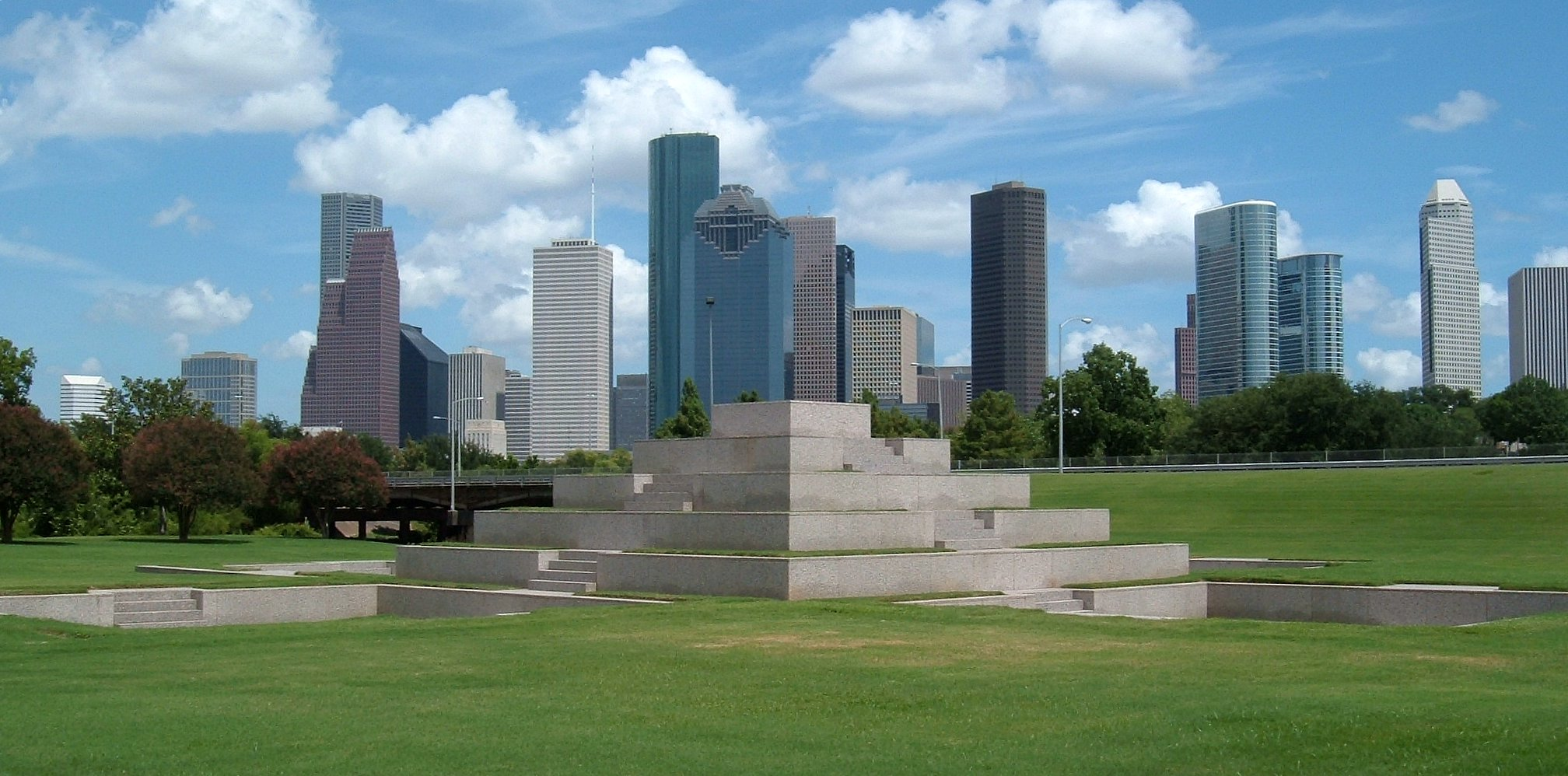
Houston Police Officer's Memorial

The Houston Police Officers Memorial, designed by Texas artist Jesús Moroles, opened in 1991 to honor the duty and sacrifices of members of the department.

== Demographics ==
Breakdown of the makeup of the rank and file of HPD:

- Male: 88%
- Female: 12%
- White: 37%
- African-American/Black: 18%
- Hispanic: 42%
- Asian: 3%

Breakdown of the types of academic degrees held by HPD members:

- Associate degree: 311
- Bachelor's Degree: 1750
- Master's Degree: 575
- Doctorate Degree: 46
- Total number of members with a degree: 2,682

== Misconduct ==
=== Joe Campos Torres ===
In May 1977, Joe Campos Torres (1954 - May 5, 1977), a 23-year-old Vietnam War veteran, was arrested for disorderly conduct at a bar in Houston's predominantly Hispanic East End neighborhood. Six Houston police officers took Torres to a spot called "The Hole" next to Buffalo Bayou and beat him. The officers then took Torres to the city jail, where they were ordered to take him to the hospital. Instead of taking Torres to the hospital, the officers took him back to the banks of Buffalo Bayou where he was pushed into the water. Torres' body was found two days later.

In June 2021, police chief Troy Finner apologized to the Torres family, calling the killing "straight-up murder." In May 2022, Janie Torres, the sister of Joe Campos Torres, was one of ten plaintiffs suing the department for false arrests during the 2020 protests against police brutality in the wake of George Floyd's murder.

=== Chad Holley beating ===
Chad Holley was a sophomore at Elsik High School at the time of his arrest in March 2010 as an alleged burglary suspect. There appeared to be obvious abuse by Houston police officers immediately prior to his arrest that was captured on a security camera video which was leaked to the public. Holley was eventually found guilty and sentenced to probation until age 18. The incident resulted in 12 officers being disciplined, fired, or charged. All appealed the decisions. Officer Andrew Blomberg, the first of four officers to go on trial, was acquitted of charges of "Official Oppression".

=== Tracie Bell ===
In September 2010, Officer Tracie Bell was sentenced to sixteen years in prison for stealing over $100,000 from American Red Cross funds earmarked for survivors of hurricanes Katrina and Rita. Bell and another officer contracted with the charity to run a basketball camp for young people displaced by the storms. They inflated the number of persons they claimed attended in order to gain additional funds.

=== Ruben Trejo ===
In April 2011, Sergeant Ruben Trejo crashed his private vehicle into a school bus while driving to work. Tests showed he had twice the legal limit of alcohol in his blood. Trejo was fired from the department.

=== Rape kits ===
In August 2011, press reports stated that the department held more than 7,000 used rape kits that had never been tested. Some of these kits dated back 20 years.

=== Abraham Joseph ===
In October 2012, Officer Abraham Joseph was sentenced to life in prison for raping a handcuffed woman in the back of his police car. During the sentencing phase of the trial, two other women came forward claiming that Joseph had also raped them.

=== Killing of Brian Claunch ===
In June 2013, a grand jury refused to indict Officer Matthew Marin after he shot and killed Brian C. Claunch on September 22, 2012. Claunch, who was mentally ill and used a wheelchair, threatened a police officer with a ballpoint pen. Marin then shot him, resulting in his death.

=== Darrin DeWayne Thomas ===
In August 2013, Officer Darrin DeWayne Thomas pleaded guilty to theft of $700. Thomas was caught in an October 2010 sting operation where he thought he had been left with the money unobserved. He was sentenced to two years of probation and agreed to surrender his Texas peace officer's license. He was expected to have no criminal record upon completing his probation.

=== Adan Jimenez Carranza ===
In October 2013, Officer Adan Jimenez Carranza pleaded guilty to "attempted sexual assault" for raping a woman in the back of his patrol car after investigating a minor traffic accident. He was sentenced to ten years in prison and twenty years on the state's sex offender registry. Carranza was expected to be eligible for parole after six months in prison.

=== Gerald Goines ===
In late February 2020, the Harris County District Attorney asked local courts to appoint lawyers to represent 69 people who had been convicted based on the testimony of Officer Gerald Goines. Goines was accused of creating a fictitious informant and making other false statements to obtain a search warrant that resulted in two deaths in a raid on a home in January 2019. Goines' misconduct threw into doubt a number of convictions based on his testimony.

== Major officer awards ==
- Chief of Police Commendation: may be presented to any department employee who demonstrated a high degree of professional excellence or initiative through the success of initiating, developing, or implementing difficult projects, programs, or investigations. The performance shall not have involved personal hazard to the individual.
- Medal of Valor: may be presented to officers who judiciously performed voluntary acts of conspicuous gallantry and extraordinary heroism above and beyond the call of duty, knowing that taking such action presented a clear threat to their lives.
- Lifesaving Award: may be presented to any classified or civilian employee when a person would more than likely have died or suffered permanent brain damage if not for the employee's actions. The act must clearly indicate the employee did at least one of the following: (a) rendered exceptional first aid or (b) made a successful rescue (e.g. from a burning building or vehicle, or from drowning).
- Blue Heart Award: may be presented to officers who received life-threatening injuries while acting judiciously and in the line of duty. Officers may be eligible to receive the Blue Heart Award in conjunction with another award such as the Meritorious Service Award or the Lifesaving Award. Injuries due to negligence or minor injuries not requiring hospitalization are not eligible.
- Meritorious Service Award: may be presented to officers who have distinguished themselves by one of the following: (a) conduct during a criminal investigation or law enforcement action while demonstrating a high level of courage or (b) actions resulting in the apprehension of a felon under dangerous or unusual circumstances.
- Award of Excellence: may be presented to classified or civilian employees who have distinguished themselves on or off duty by outstanding service to HPD or the community. Employees must have demonstrated a high degree of dedication and professionalism in an endeavor that does not meet any other award criteria.
- Hostile Engagement Award: may be presented to officers who acted judiciously in the line of duty and performed acts upholding the high standards of the law enforcement profession while engaging in hostile confrontations with suspects wielding deadly weapons. Individuals who sustained non-life-threatening or minor injuries resulting from an assault by a deadly weapon are also eligible.
- Humanitarian Service Award: may be presented to any individual (employee or not) who demonstrated a voluntary act of donating time, physical effort, financial support, or special talent promoting the safety, health, education, or welfare of citizens. The individual is not eligible if there was any personal gain, financial compensation, special services, or privileges in exchange for the act.
- Public Service Award: may be presented to any individual outside the department who voluntarily acted in circumstances requiring unusual courage or heroism while assisting a police officer or other citizen. Those who do not meet the above criteria, but provided a measure of assistance, shall be sent a letter and a Certificate of Appreciation (no citation page) signed by the Chief of Police.
- Chief of Police Unit Citation: may be presented to two or more employees who performed an act or a series of acts over a period of time that demonstrated exceptional bravery or outstanding service to the department or the community. Their combined efforts as a functioning team must have resulted in the attainment of a departmental goal(s) and increased the department's effectiveness and efficiency.

== See also ==
- List of law enforcement agencies in Texas
- Houston Blue - A book about the police department
- Crime in Houston
