= Houston Police Officer's Memorial =

Houston Police Officers Memorial
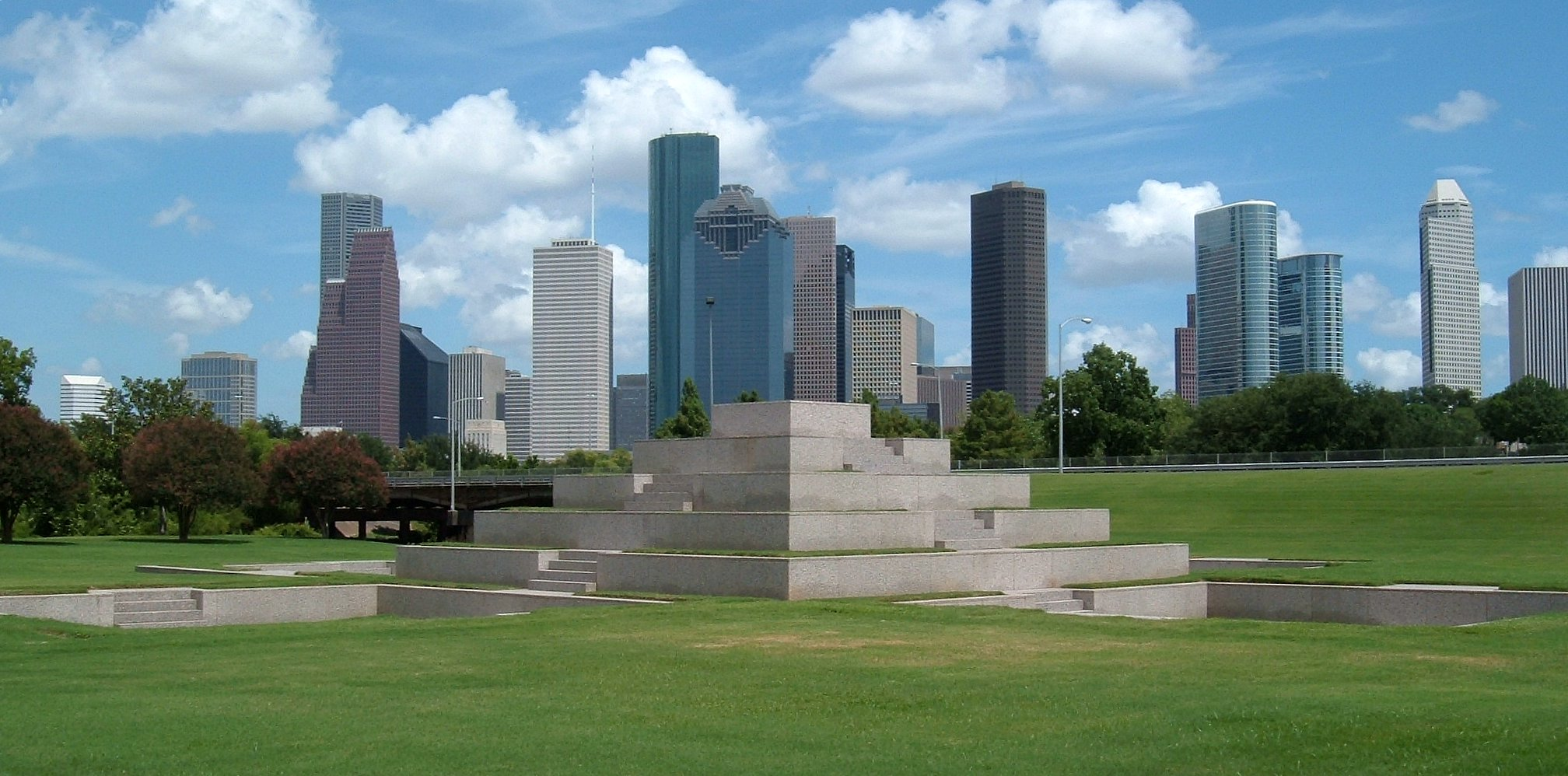
- Western view of the memorial
- Interactive map of Houston Police Officers Memorial
- Location: Houston, Texas, U.S.
- Coordinates: 29°45′53″N 95°22′36″W
- Designer: Jesús Bautista Moroles
- Material: Granite
- Length: 120 ft (37 m)
- Width: 120 ft (37 m)
- Height: 12.5 ft (3.8 m)
- Opening date: 1991
- Dedicated to: Houston Police Department Fallen Officers

The Houston Police Officers Memorial is a piece of public art erected in Houston, Texas, in 1991, to recognize the sacrifices made by city police officers and to honor those who have lost their lives in the line of duty. The monument is a large-scale granite sculpture by artist Jesús Bautista Moroles.

== Memorial ==
The piece is set as a 120 ft (37 m) by 120 ft (37 m) Greek cross with a stepped pyramid at its center. The arms of the cross are formed by stepped pyramids of equal size that are sunk into the ground. Each pyramid is 40 ft (12 m) on each side, and the height of the center pyramid and the depth of the inverted pyramids is 12.5 ft (3.8 m). The top of the pyramid contains a pink granite reflecting pool engraved with the names of over 100 officers killed in the line of duty. A small version of the reflecting pool is located near the car park for those who cannot climb to the apex of the monument.

The memorial is continuously guarded by police officers. There is an annual ceremony held at the memorial to honor the fallen police officers.

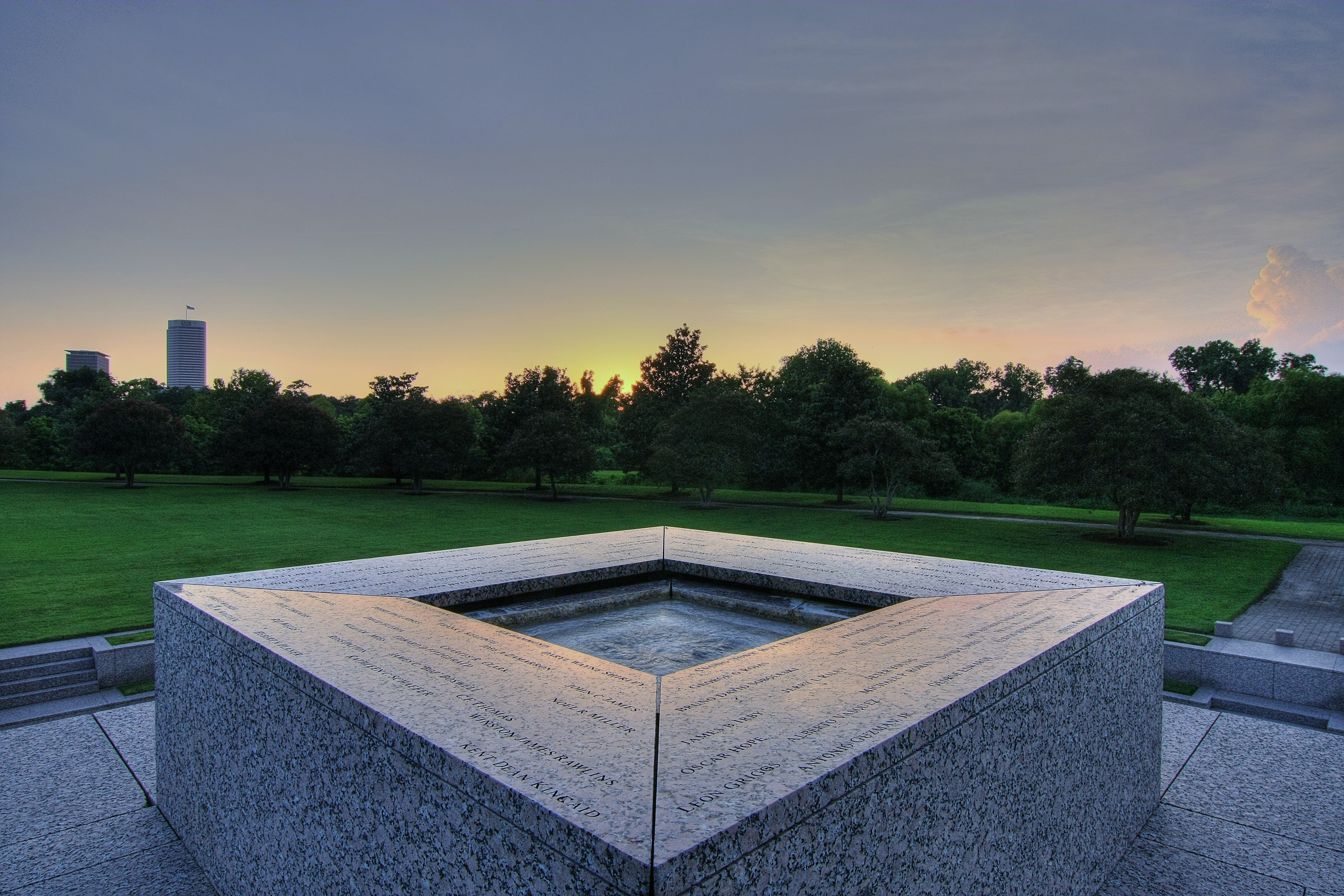
Houston Police Officers Memorial reflecting pool at dusk

== History ==
Fundraising for the sculpture began in 1985. Patrons that contributed to the sculpture fund include the Knox Foundation, the Cullen Foundation, the Fayez Sarofim and Company, the Rockwell Fund, the Brown Foundation, the M.D. Anderson Foundation, the Scurlock Foundation, the Neva and Wesley West Foundation, and Albert and Margaret Alkek.
