= Harold Hurtt =

American police officer

- Born: July 14, 1946 (age 80); Campbell County, Virginia
- Police career
- Country: 2004-2009
- Department: Houston Police Department
- Service years: 1977 - Present
- Rank: Phoenix PD Patrolman - 1968 chief of the Oxnard, California, Police Department - 1992; Phoenix Police Chief - 1998; Houston Police Chief - 2004

Harold L. Hurtt is an Assistant Director at the U.S. Immigration and Customs Enforcement (ICE) for the Office of State, Local and Tribal Coordination, which consists of outreach programs and communications coordination between various outside law enforcement agencies. Hurtt previously served as police chief of the Houston Police Department from 2004 until 2009.

== Career ==
In 1992, he became Chief of Police for the Oxnard Police Department in California, and then in 1998 was appointed Chief of the Phoenix Police Department. In 2004, Hurtt was selected as police chief of the Houston Police Department until his resignation in 2009. In 2010, Hurtt was appointed to lead the OSLTC of the U.S. Immigration and Customs Enforcement.

== Education ==
Hurtt earned a B.A. in sociology from Arizona State University in 1977 and an M.A. in organizational management from the University of Phoenix in 1991.

== Career highlights ==
=== Dress code and facial hair controversy ===
Shortly after taking office in Houston, Hurtt required police to cover up tattoos with long sleeves, if needed. Additionally, he required all facial hair to be removed, citing that it would prevent gas masks to be used effectively. This resulted in a group of African American officers filing a lawsuit claiming that they have skin conditions called Pseudofolliculitis barbae or Acne keloidalis nuchae that make it painful to shave. The city supported Chief Hurtt's new policy and approved $150,000 for legal defense against the suit. The suit was eventually tossed out.

=== Tasers ===
Houston became the first major city in the nation to fully arm the entire police department with tasers with an authorization of $4.7 million in November 2004, the result of a controversial shooting the previous year. Chief Hurtt hoped to reduce police shootings as he had as Chief of the Phoenix Police Department.

=== Evidence facility compromised ===
Due to several cases of missing evidence, including missing drugs and guns, Hurtt eventually ordered the construction of a new evidence building, which was completed in 2009.

=== Crime Lab ===
Chief Hurtt was initially brought in to help reorganize a crime lab after scandals that left many cases suspect. Within two years, the crime lab regained its accreditation and returned to full operation.

=== Mobility Response Team ===
On July 2, 2007, Houston Mayor White and Chief Hurtt unveiled the Mobility Response Team (MRT). The new teams were designed to respond to various traffic issues around the Downtown Houston area and free up police officers who would otherwise direct traffic around accidents and major events. The department was started with 21 personnel and an annual $1.8 million budget. On March 3, 2009 March 3, a series of investigative reports by KTRK's Wayne Dolcefino questioned effectiveness, ethics, and work practices of the Mobility Response Team. After the report, one supervisor had been reassigned and the entire MRT unit faced an internal affairs investigation.

== Criticism ==
Hurtt has faced criticism for his policies condoning illegal immigration. These policies included refusing to hand over arrested illegal aliens to Immigration and Customs Enforcement (ICE), causing some to designate Houston a sanctuary city. In 2006, Houston police officer Rodney Johnson was shot four times in the head during a routine traffic stop by a once-deported illegal immigrant who had been arrested and released three times in the city.

His widow, Joslyn Johnson, herself a sergeant in the Houston Police Department, filed suit against Hurtt, the city and the police department, stating that the department's failure to discover the gunman's immigration status and report him to federal authorities enabled him to stay "at large" in the country. Hurtt's policies have been blamed for enabling illegal immigrants to kill two police officers and seriously injure another in Phoenix, Arizona before he left in 2005.

== Resignation ==
It was reported that during the 2009 Houston Mayoral Election, candidates Peter Hoyt Brown, Annise Parker, and Roy Morales said that they would replace Hurtt if they become mayor. Upon Annise Parker's win, Hurtt tendered his resignation on December 15, which became effective on December 30. Hurtt was replaced with interim police chief, Charles McClelland, a 33-year veteran of the force.
