= Jesús Moroles =

American sculptor (1950–2015)

Jesús B. Moroles
- Born: September 22, 1950; Corpus Christi, Texas, U.S.
- Died: June 15, 2015 (aged 64) near Jarrell, Texas, U.S.
- Education: Luis Jiménez
- Alma mater: University of North Texas
- Known for: Sculpture
- Awards: United States National Medal of Arts

Jesús Bautista Moroles (September 22, 1950 – June 15, 2015) was an American sculptor, known for his monumental abstract granite works. He lived and worked in Rockport, Texas, where his studio and workshop were based, and where all of his work was prepared and finished before being shipped out for installation. In 2008, he was awarded the National Medal of Arts. Over two thousand works by Moroles are held in public and private collections in the United States, China, Egypt, France, Italy, Japan, and Switzerland.

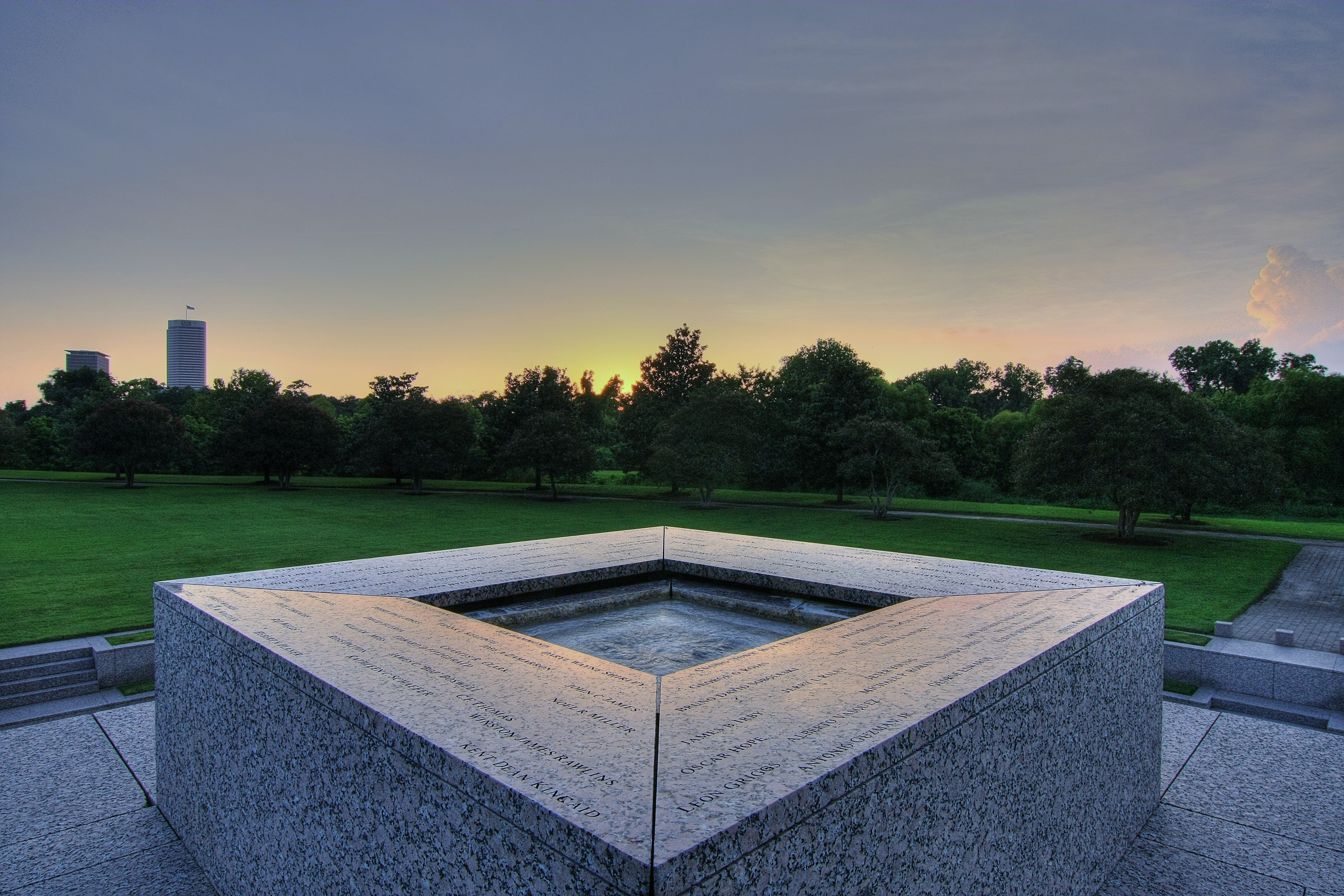
Houston Police Officer's Memorial

== Career ==
Moroles was born in Corpus Christi, Texas. He earned an associate degree from El Centro College in Dallas, Texas in 1975, and a Bachelor of Fine Arts from the University of North Texas in 1978. Also in 1978, he was an apprentice to sculptor Luis Jiménez. After studying for a year in Italy in 1980, he returned to Texas and began producing his trademark large-scale granite sculptures. Jesús also served for 4 years in the United States Air Force.

One of his first commissions was "Floating Mesa Fountain" for the Albuquerque Museum. In 1987, he created one of his best-known pieces, "Lapstrake," for CBS Plaza in New York City. His largest work is the Houston Police Officer's Memorial, which was installed in 1990 in Houston, Texas. In 1995, he created three rose-colored granite works for the entrance to the Edwin A. Ulrich Museum in Wichita, Kansas, which are entitled Granite Landscape, Granite Weaving, and Fountain Wall. In 1997, he created the public art piece "The Fallen Friend" for the New Mexico Veterans Memorial Park, which consists of 84 Portland cement pylons. In 2005, he installed the work Gateway Stele at Lubben Plaza in Dallas, Texas. His works are displayed in numerous museums in the United States and other countries, including the personal White House Collection, the Albuquerque Museum, the New Mexico Museum of Art, the Dallas Museum of Art, the Museum of Fine Arts, Houston, and the Smithsonian Institution.

In June 2015, Moroles's work Spirit Inner Columns was installed in the Hall Arts complex in Dallas. The work consists of four 15-foot, 10,000 pound granite columns.

On June 15, 2015, Moroles was killed in a car accident on I-35 near Jarrell, Texas. At the time of his death, he was leading a student internship program at the University of Science and Arts of Oklahoma, where he had been artist-in-residence and primary designer for the university's Coming Together Park. Moroles's studio in Rockport will work with USAO to finish the park, and the university is planning an event honoring Moroles for September 2015.

In March 2021, the trustees of the Dallas Independent School District voted unanimously to rename its Sidney Lanier Expressive Arts Vanguard School in West Dallas for Moroles. The artist attended the school when he was young. The name change went into effect in the fall of 2021.

== Works ==
Museums where Moroles's works are displayed include the Dallas Museum of Art, Modern Art Museum of Fort Worth, Museum of Contemporary Art in Osaka, Japan, as Museum of Fine Arts, Museum of Fine Arts in Houston, Museum of Fine Arts in Santa Fe, New Mexico, Albuquerque Museum, the Art Museum of Southeast Texas, Beaumont, Texas, and the Smithsonian American Art Museum. Moroles' sculptures have been included in over three hundred museum and gallery exhibitions worldwide.

His sculptures are also displayed in the corporate offices of American Airlines (Dallas/Ft. Worth, TX), AT&T (Dallas), Citigroup (NY, commissioned by EF Hutton), Credit Suisse (NY and Houston), American General Corporation (Houston), Texaco (Houston), Trammell Crow Company (Dallas), Viacom (NY, commissioned by CBS), the Woodlands Corporation (Woodlands, TX), and the lobby of downtown Houston's Hilton Americas-Houston hotel.

His public art works include the China International City Sculpture in Beijing, Houston's Hermann Park, the Houston Police Officers Memorial, and Xiadu Park in Yanquing, China.

== Style and technique ==
While he studied in Italy, Moroles was inspired by the marble-carving techniques he observed. When he returned to Texas, he decided that he would focus on stone as an artistic medium. To cut granite, Moroles used diamond saws. Moroles's works include both polished and natural granite surfaces in what he described as a "harmonious coexistence." He described his works as a "discussion" of how man interacts with nature, and he wanted viewers not only to observe his sculptures but also to touch the different surfaces.

== Awards ==
Moroles received state and national-level awards for his work. In 2007, he was awarded the Texas Medal of the Arts. In 2008, Moroles was awarded the National Medal of Arts. In 2011, he was designated a Texas State Artist by the Texas Commission on the Arts.
