= CJRA =

CJRA may refer to:

- Civil Justice Reform Act
- Crime and Justice Research Alliance
