= 101st United States Congress =

1989–1991 U.S. legislative term

←	100th	102nd	→
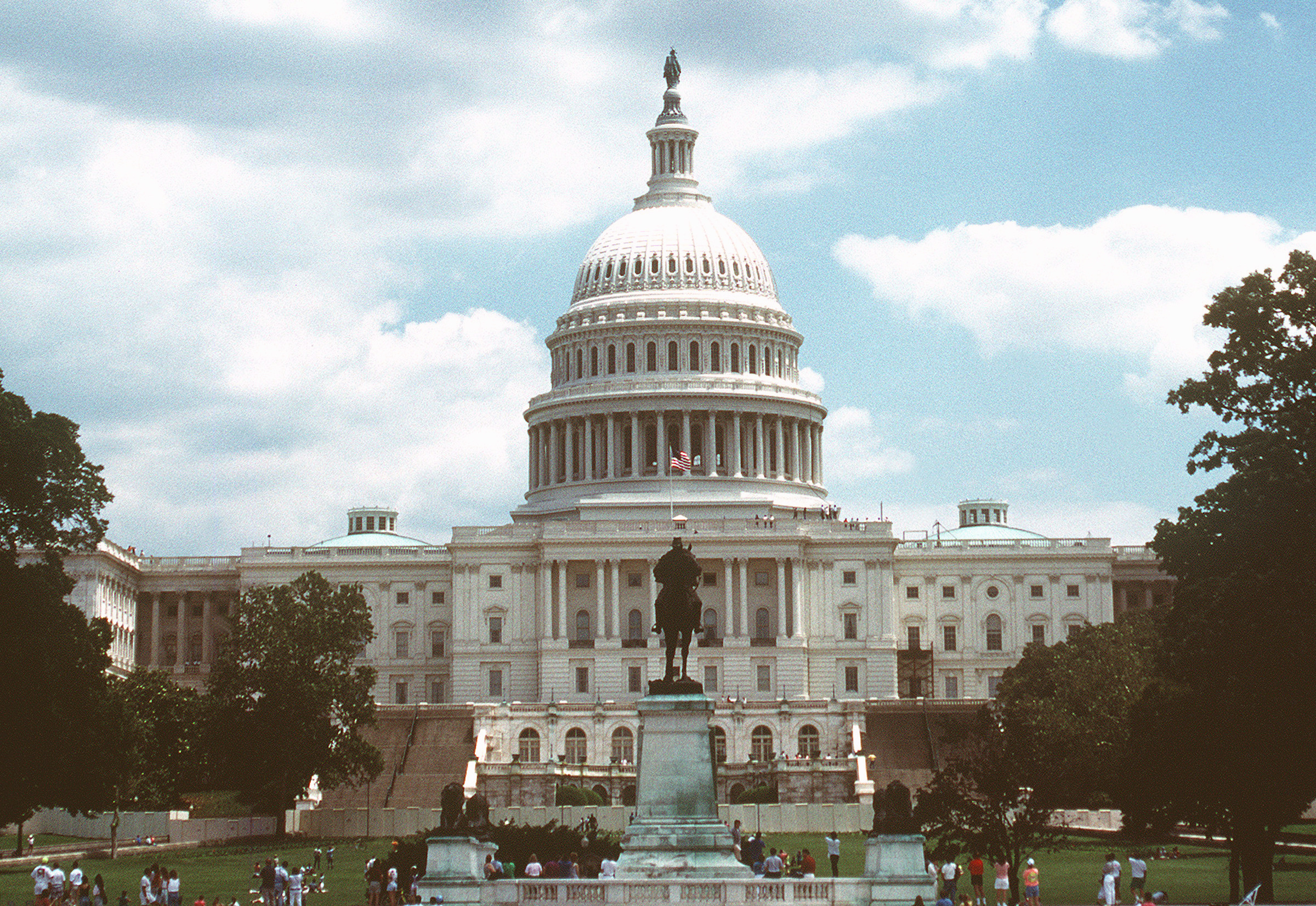
- United States Capitol (1991)

Overview
- Legislative body: United States Congress
- Jurisdiction: United States
- Term: January 3, 1989 – January 3, 1991

Senate
- Members: 100
- President: George H. W. Bush (R) (until January 20, 1989) (Note: U.S. Vice President George H. W. Bush's term as President of the Senate ended at noon on January 20, 1989, when Dan Quayle's term began.); Dan Quayle (R) (from January 20, 1989)
- President pro tempore: Robert Byrd (D)
- Party control: Democratic

House of Representatives
- Members: 435 representatives 5 non-voting delegates
- Speaker: Jim Wright (D) (until June 6, 1989); Tom Foley (D) (from June 6, 1989)
- Party control: Democratic

Sessions
- 1st: January 3, 1989 – November 22, 1989
- 2nd: January 23, 1990 – October 28, 1990

The 101st United States Congress was a meeting of the legislative branch of the United States federal government, composed of the United States Senate and the United States House of Representatives. It met in Washington, D.C., from January 3, 1989, to January 3, 1991, during the final weeks of Ronald Reagan's presidency and the first two years of George H. W. Bush's presidency.

The apportionment of seats in this House of Representatives was based on the 1980 United States census. Both chambers maintained a Democratic majority.

== Major events ==
- January 20, 1989: George H. W. Bush became President of the United States
- February 9, 1989: President Bush addressed a joint session of Congress
- February 23, 1989: Senate Armed Services Committee rejected President Bush's nomination of John Tower for Secretary of Defense
- March 24, 1989: Exxon Valdez oil spill
- December 20, 1989: Operation Just Cause launched to overthrow Panamanian leader Manuel Noriega

== Major legislation ==
=== Enacted ===
- April 10, 1989: Whistleblower Protection Act, Pub. L. 101–12, 103 Stat. 16
- August 9, 1989: Financial Institutions Reform, Recovery, and Enforcement Act of 1989, Pub. L. 101–73, 103 Stat. 183
- October 28, 1989: Flag Protection Act of 1989, Pub. L. 101–131, 103 Stat. 777
- May 22, 1990: Biological Weapons Anti-Terrorism Act of 1989, Pub. L. 101–298, 104 Stat. 201
- July 26, 1990: Americans with Disabilities Act, Pub. L. 101–336, 104 Stat. 327
- August 18, 1990: Oil Pollution Act of 1990, Pub. L. 101–380, 104 Stat. 484
- August 18, 1990: Ryan White CARE Act of 1990, Pub. L. 101–391, 104 Stat. 576
- September 25, 1990: Hotel and Motel Fire Safety Act of 1990, Pub. L. 101–391, 104 Stat. 747
- October 30, 1990: Native American Languages Act of 1990, Pub. L. 101–477, 104 Stat. 1152
- October 30, 1990: Individuals with Disabilities Education Act of 1990. Pub. L. 101–476, 104 Stat. 1142
- November 5, 1990: Omnibus Budget Reconciliation Act of 1990, Pub. L. 101–508, 104 Stat. 1388 (including Human Genome Project funding)
- November 12, 1990: Water Resources Development Act of 1990 (WRDA 1990), Pub. L. 101–640
- November 15, 1990: Administrative Dispute Resolution Act, Pub. L. 101–552, 104 Stat. 2736
- November 15, 1990: Spark M. Matsunaga Hydrogen Research, Development, and Demonstration Act of 1990, Pub. L. 101–566, 104 Stat. 2797
- November 16, 1990: Native American Graves Protection and Repatriation Act, Pub. L. 101–601, 104 Stat. 3048
- November 16, 1990: Global Change Research Act of 1990, Pub. L. 101–606, 104 Stat. 3096
- November 28, 1990: Tongass Timber Reform Act, Pub. L. 101–626
- November 28, 1990: Food and Drug Administration Revitalization Act, Pub. L. 101–635, 104 Stat. 4583
- November 29, 1990: Negotiated Rulemaking Act, Pub. L. 101–648, 104 Stat. 4969
- November 29, 1990: Indian Arts and Crafts Act of 1990, Pub. L. 101–644, 104 Stat. 4662
- November 29, 1990: Immigration Act of 1990, Pub. L. 101–649, 104 Stat. 4978
- November 29, 1990: Gun-Free School Zones Act of 1990, Pub. L. 101–647, 104 Stat. 4789
- December 1, 1990: Judicial Improvements Act of 1990, Pub. L. 101–650, 104 Stat. 5128 (including Visual Artists Rights Act)

=== Vetoed ===
- October 22, 1990: Civil Rights Act of 1990, S. 2104. Override attempt failed in Senate, 66-34 (1 vote short of 67 needed to override).

== Treaties ratified ==
- March 1, 1989: Berne Convention for the Protection of Literary and Artistic Works, an international treaty on copyrights, ratified

== Party summary ==
=== Senate ===
Party standings in the Senate 55 Democratic Senators 45 Republican Senators

	Party (shading shows control)		Total	Vacant
	Democratic (D)	Republican (R)	Total	Vacant
End of previous congress	54	45	99	1
Begin	55	45	100	0
End	55	45	100	0
Final voting share	55.0%	45.0%		
Beginning of next congress	56	44	100	0

=== House of Representatives ===
	Party (shading shows control)			Total	Vacant
	Democratic (D)	Republican (R)	Independent (I)	Total	Vacant
End of previous congress	255	178	0	433	2
Begin	259	174	0	433	2
End	259	174	0	433	2
Final voting share	59.8%	40.2%	0.0%		
Beginning of next congress	267	167	1	435	0

== Leadership ==
=== Senate ===
Senate President

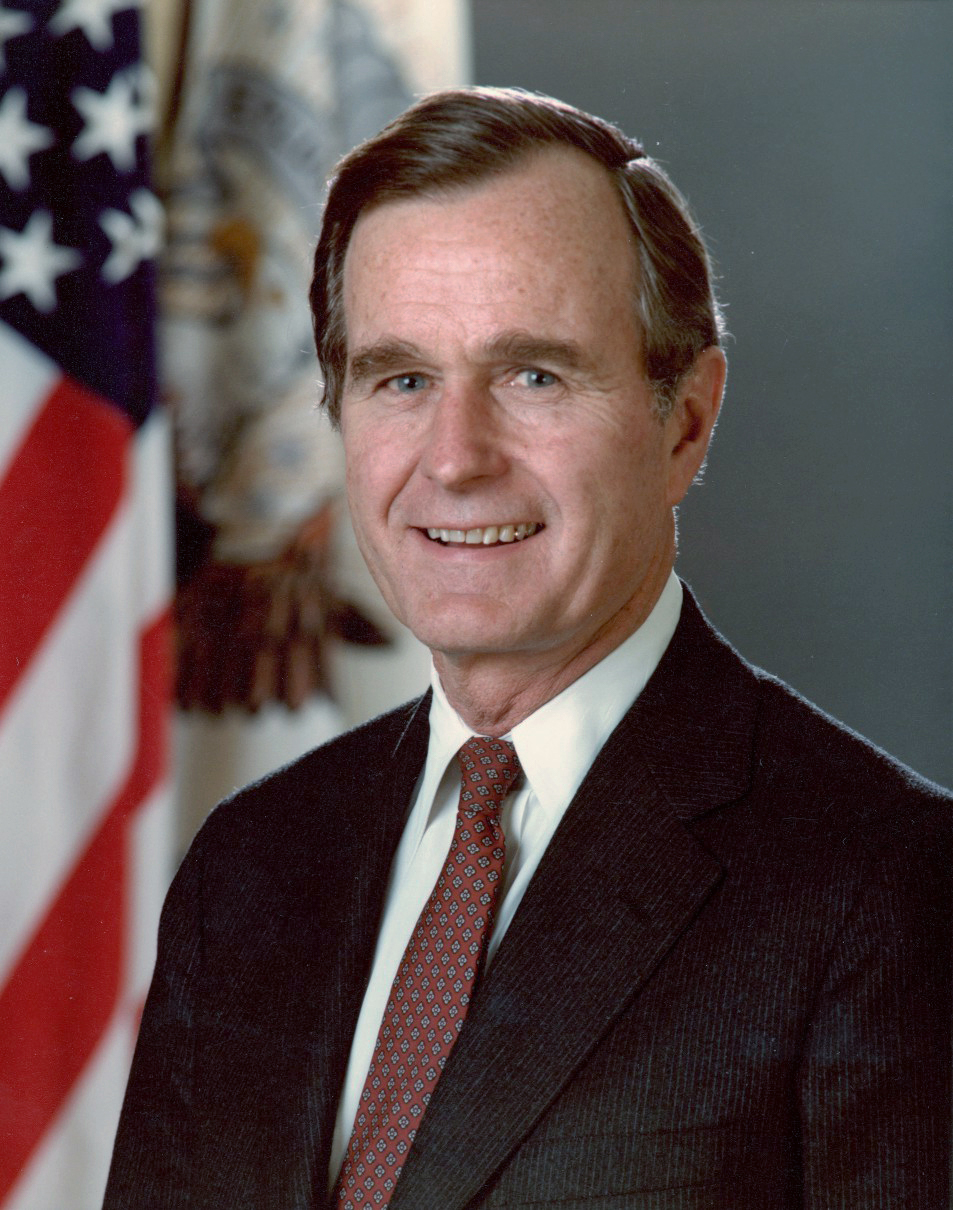
George H. W. Bush (R),
until January 20, 1989

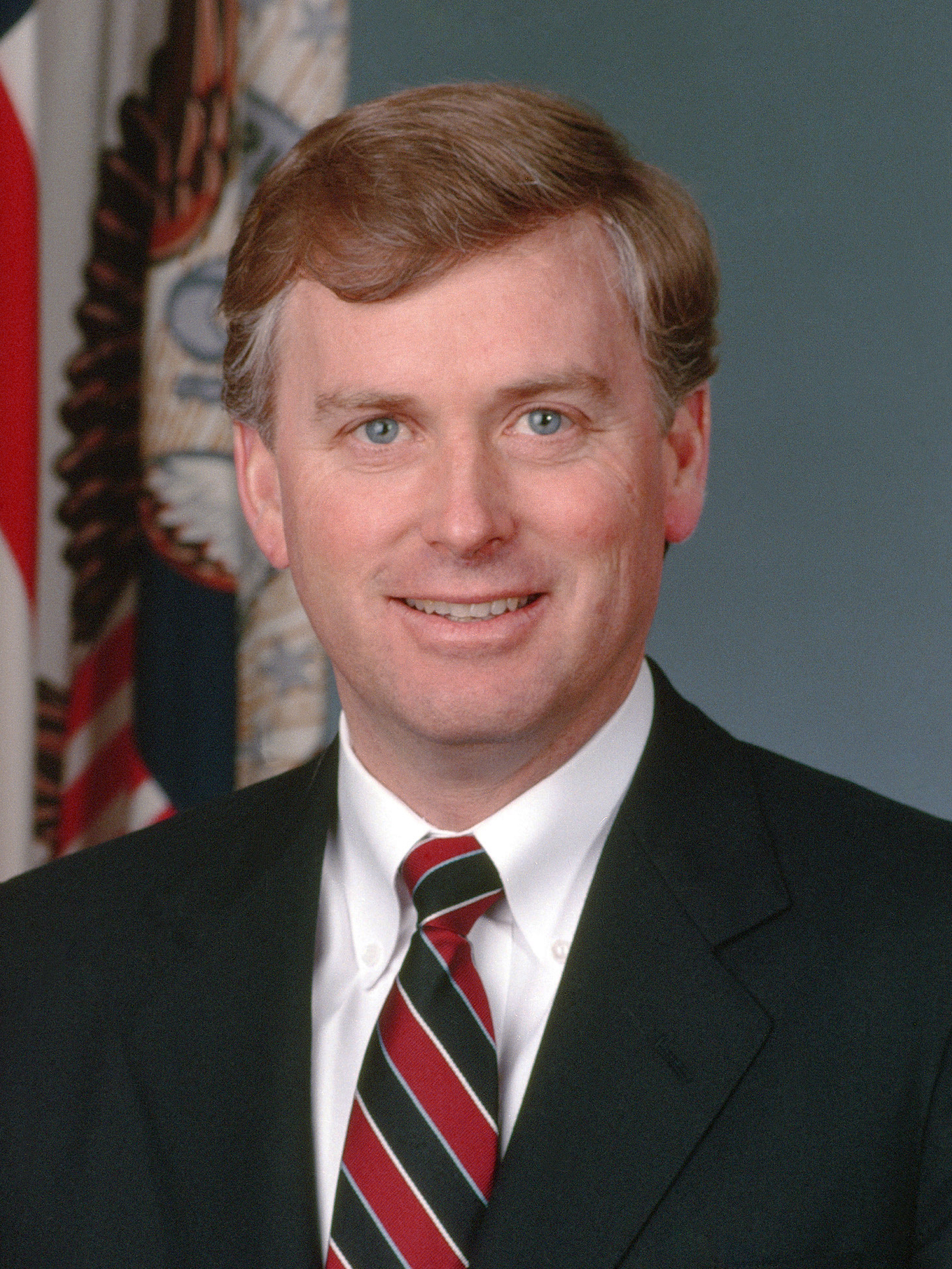
Dan Quayle (R),
from January 20, 1989

Senate President pro Tempore

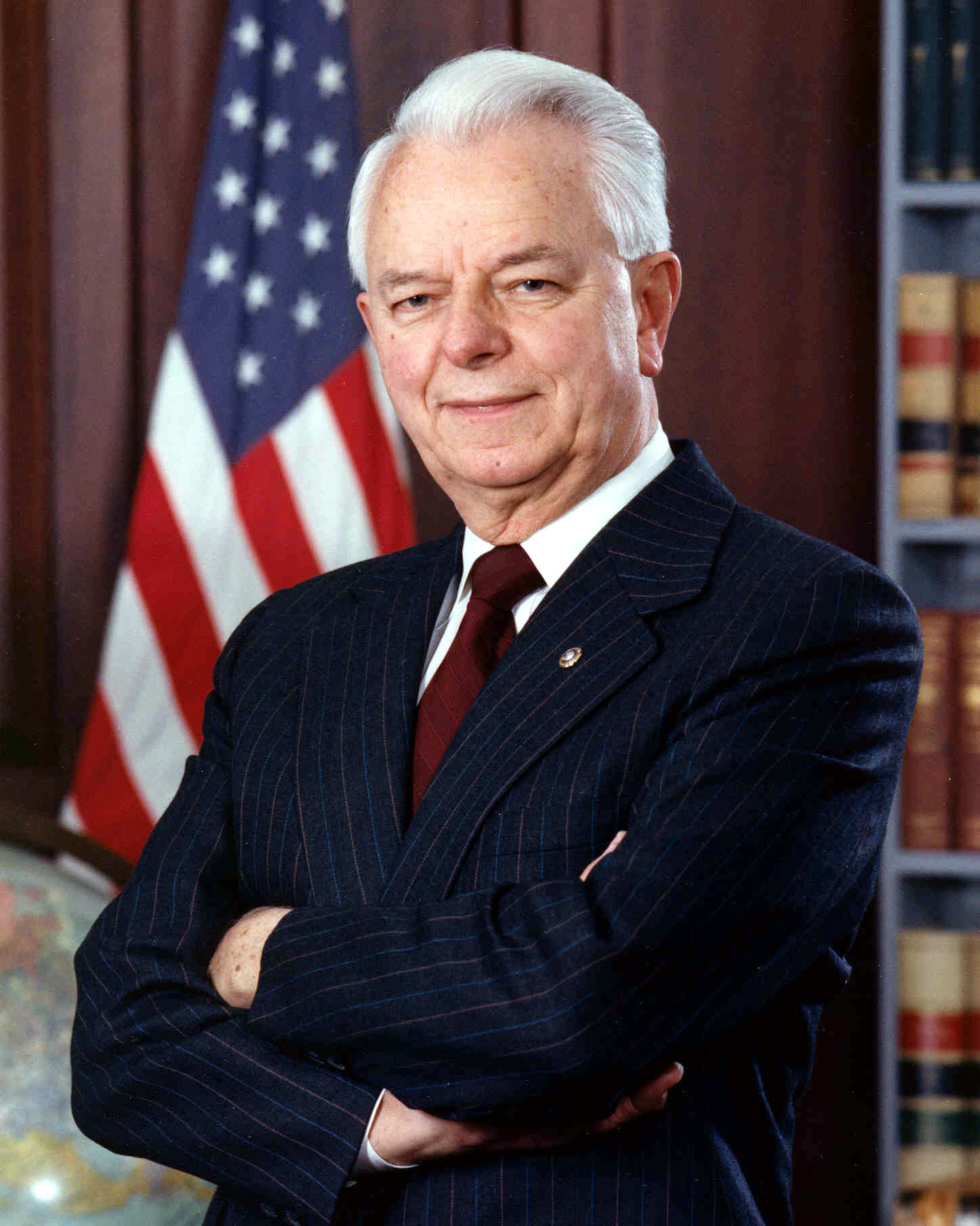
Robert Byrd (D)

- President: George H. W. Bush (R), until January 20, 1989
  - Dan Quayle (R), from January 20, 1989
- President pro tempore: Robert Byrd (D)

==== Democratic majority ====
- Majority Leader: George J. Mitchell
- Majority Whip: Alan Cranston
- Policy Committee Co-Chair: Harry Reid
- Democratic Caucus Secretary: David Pryor
- Democratic Campaign Committee Chairman: John Breaux
- Chief Deputy Whip: Alan J. Dixon

==== Republican minority ====
- Minority Leader: Bob Dole
- Minority Whip: Alan K. Simpson
- Republican Conference Chairman: John Chafee
- Republican Conference Secretary: Thad Cochran
- National Senatorial Committee Chair: Don Nickles
- Policy Committee Chairman: William L. Armstrong

=== House of Representatives ===
House Speaker

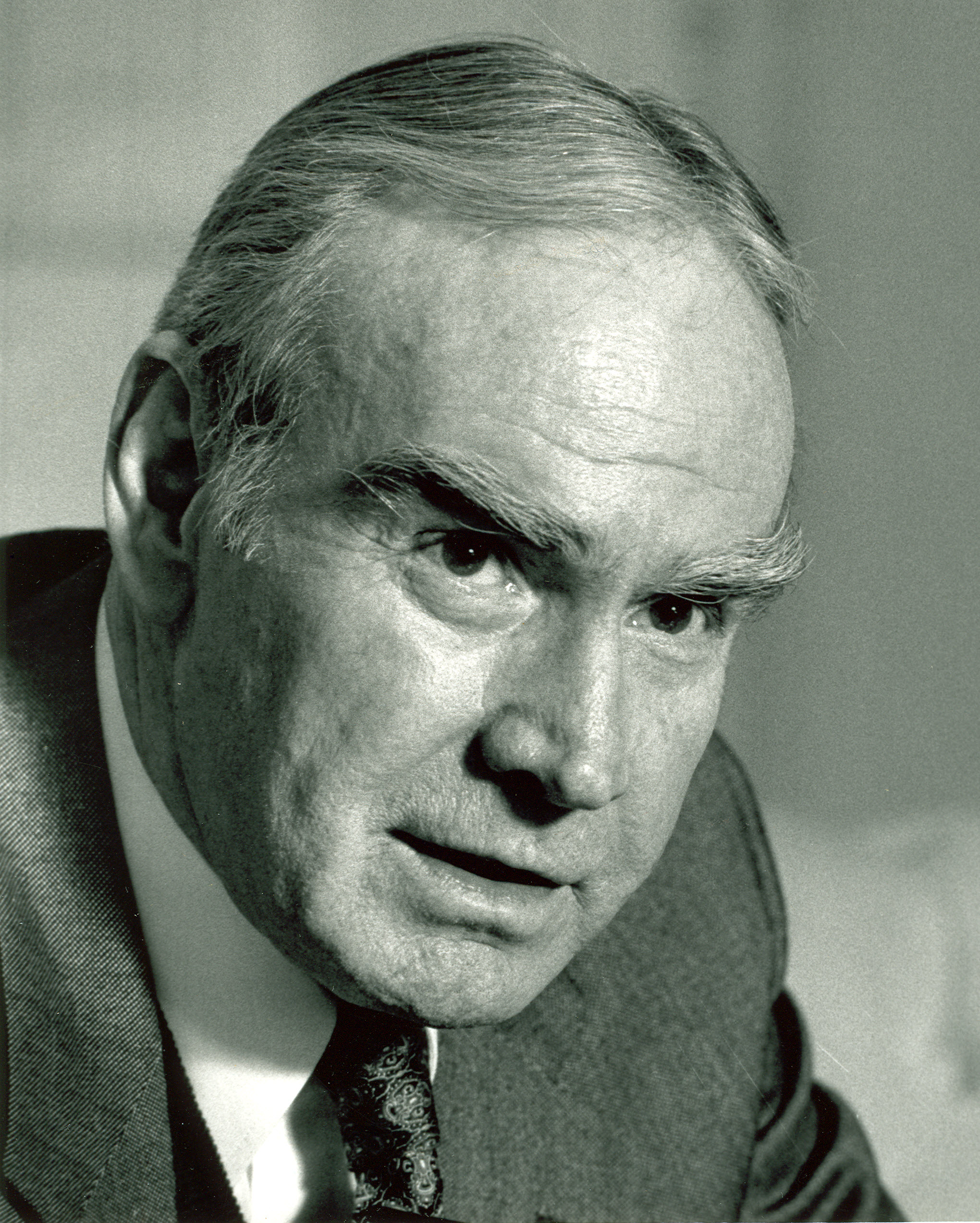
Jim Wright (D),
until June 6, 1989

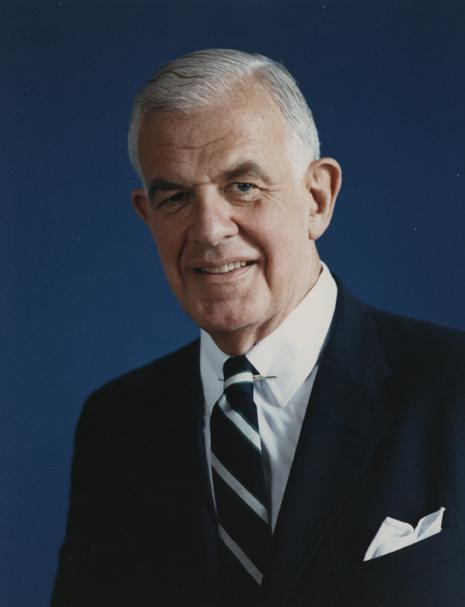
Tom Foley (D),
from June 6, 1989

- Speaker: Jim Wright (D), until June 6, 1989
  - Tom Foley (D), from June 6, 1989

==== Democratic majority ====
- Majority Leader: Tom Foley, until June 6, 1989
  - Dick Gephardt, from June 6, 1989
- Majority Whip: Tony Coelho, until June 15, 1989
  - William H. Gray III, from June 15, 1989
- Chief Deputy Majority Whip: David Bonior
- Democratic Caucus Chairman: William H. Gray III, until June 15, 1989
  - Steny Hoyer, from June 15, 1989
- Democratic Caucus Vice-Chairman: Steny Hoyer, until June 21, 1989
  - Vic Fazio, from June 21, 1989
- Democratic Campaign Committee Chairman: Beryl Anthony Jr.

==== Republican minority ====
- Minority Leader: Robert H. Michel
- Minority Whip: Dick Cheney, until March 20, 1989
  - Newt Gingrich, from March 20, 1989
- Chief Deputy Whip: Robert Smith Walker
- Republican Conference Chairman: Jerry Lewis
- Republican Conference Vice-Chairman: Bill McCollum
- Republican Conference Secretary: Vin Weber
- Policy Committee Chairman: Mickey Edwards
- Republican Campaign Committee Chairman: Guy Vander Jagt

== Caucuses ==
- Congressional Arts Caucus
- Congressional Automotive Caucus
- Biomedical Research Caucus
- Congressional Black Caucus
- Congressional Fire Services Caucus
- Congressional Friends of Ireland Caucus
- Congressional Hispanic Caucus
- Congressional Pediatric & Adult Hydrocephalus Caucus
- Congressional Travel & Tourism Caucus
- Congresswomen's Caucus
- House Democratic Caucus
- Senate Democratic Caucus

== Members ==
This list is arranged by chamber, then by state. Senators are listed in order of seniority, and representatives are listed by district.

=== Senate ===
Senators are popularly elected statewide every two years, with one-third beginning new six-year terms with each Congress, In this Congress, Class 2 meant their term ended with this Congress, facing re-election in 1990; Class 3 meant their term began in the last Congress, facing re-election in 1992; and Class 1 meant their term began in this Congress, facing re-election in 1994.

==== Alabama ====
▌2. Howell Heflin (D)
▌3. Richard Shelby (D)

==== Alaska ====
▌2. Ted Stevens (R)
▌3. Frank Murkowski (R)

==== Arizona ====
▌1. Dennis DeConcini (D)
▌3. John McCain (R)

==== Arkansas ====
▌2. David Pryor (D)
▌3. Dale Bumpers (D)

==== California ====
▌1. Pete Wilson (R)
▌3. Alan Cranston (D)

==== Colorado ====
▌2. William L. Armstrong (R)
▌3. Tim Wirth (D)

==== Connecticut ====
▌1. Joe Lieberman (D)
▌3. Chris Dodd (D)

==== Delaware ====
▌1. William Roth (R)
▌2. Joe Biden (D)

==== Florida ====
▌1. Connie Mack III (R)
▌3. Bob Graham (D)

==== Georgia ====
▌2. Sam Nunn (D)
▌3. Wyche Fowler (D)

==== Hawaii ====
▌1. Spark Matsunaga (D), until April 15, 1990

▌Daniel Akaka (D), from May 16, 1990

▌3. Daniel Inouye (D)

==== Idaho ====
▌2. James A. McClure (R)
▌3. Steve Symms (R)

==== Illinois ====
▌2. Paul Simon (D)
▌3. Alan J. Dixon (D)

==== Indiana ====
▌1. Richard Lugar (R)
▌3. Dan Coats (R)

==== Iowa ====
▌2. Tom Harkin (D)
▌3. Chuck Grassley (R)

==== Kansas ====
▌2. Nancy Kassebaum (R)
▌3. Bob Dole (R)

==== Kentucky ====
▌2. Mitch McConnell (R)
▌3. Wendell Ford (D)

==== Louisiana ====
▌2. J. Bennett Johnston (D)
▌3. John Breaux (D)

==== Maine ====
▌1. George J. Mitchell (D)
▌2. William Cohen (R)

==== Maryland ====
▌1. Paul Sarbanes (D)
▌3. Barbara Mikulski (D)

==== Massachusetts ====
▌1. Ted Kennedy (D)
▌2. John Kerry (D)

==== Michigan ====
▌1. Donald Riegle (D)
▌2. Carl Levin (D)

==== Minnesota ====
▌1. David Durenberger (I-R) (Note: The Republican Party of Minnesota was officially known as the Independent-Republicans of Minnesota from November 15, 1975, until September 23, 1995, and are counted as Republicans.)
▌2. Rudy Boschwitz (I-R)

==== Mississippi ====
▌1. Trent Lott (R)
▌2. Thad Cochran (R)

==== Missouri ====
▌1. John Danforth (R)
▌3. Kit Bond (R)

==== Montana ====
▌1. Conrad Burns (R)
▌2. Max Baucus (D)

==== Nebraska ====
▌1. Bob Kerrey (D)
▌2. J. James Exon (D)

==== Nevada ====
▌1. Richard Bryan (D)
▌3. Harry Reid (D)

==== New Hampshire ====
▌2. Gordon J. Humphrey (R), until December 4, 1990

▌Bob Smith (R), from December 7, 1990

▌3. Warren Rudman (R)

==== New Jersey ====
▌1. Frank Lautenberg (D)
▌2. Bill Bradley (D)

==== New Mexico ====
▌1. Jeff Bingaman (D)
▌2. Pete Domenici (R)

==== New York ====
▌1. Daniel Patrick Moynihan (D)
▌3. Al D'Amato (R)

==== North Carolina ====
▌2. Jesse Helms (R)
▌3. Terry Sanford (D)

==== North Dakota ====
▌1. Quentin Burdick (D-NPL) (Note: The Minnesota Democratic–Farmer–Labor Party (DFL) and the North Dakota Democratic-Nonpartisan League Party (D-NPL) are the Minnesota and North Dakota affiliates of the U.S. Democratic Party and are counted as Democrats.)
▌3. Kent Conrad (D-NPL)

==== Ohio ====
▌1. Howard Metzenbaum (D)
▌3. John Glenn (D)

==== Oklahoma ====
▌2. David Boren (D)
▌3. Don Nickles (R)

==== Oregon ====
▌2. Mark Hatfield (R)
▌3. Bob Packwood (R)

==== Pennsylvania ====
▌1. John Heinz (R)
▌3. Arlen Specter (R)

==== Rhode Island ====
▌1. John Chafee (R)
▌2. Claiborne Pell (D)

==== South Carolina ====
▌2. Strom Thurmond (R)
▌3. Fritz Hollings (D)

==== South Dakota ====
▌2. Larry Pressler (R)
▌3. Tom Daschle (D)

==== Tennessee ====
▌1. Jim Sasser (D)
▌2. Al Gore (D)

==== Texas ====
▌1. Lloyd Bentsen (D)
▌2. Phil Gramm (R)

==== Utah ====
▌1. Orrin Hatch (R)
▌3. Jake Garn (R)

==== Vermont ====
▌1. Jim Jeffords (R)
▌3. Patrick Leahy (D)

==== Virginia ====
▌1. Chuck Robb (D)
▌2. John Warner (R)

==== Washington ====
▌1. Slade Gorton (R)
▌3. Brock Adams (D)

==== West Virginia ====
▌1. Robert Byrd (D)
▌2. Jay Rockefeller (D)

==== Wisconsin ====
▌1. Herb Kohl (D)
▌3. Bob Kasten (R)

==== Wyoming ====
▌1. Malcolm Wallop (R)
▌2. Alan Simpson (R)

Senators' party membership by state at the opening of the 101st Congress in January 1989 2 Democrats 1 Democrat and 1 Republican 2 Republicans

Senate majority leadership

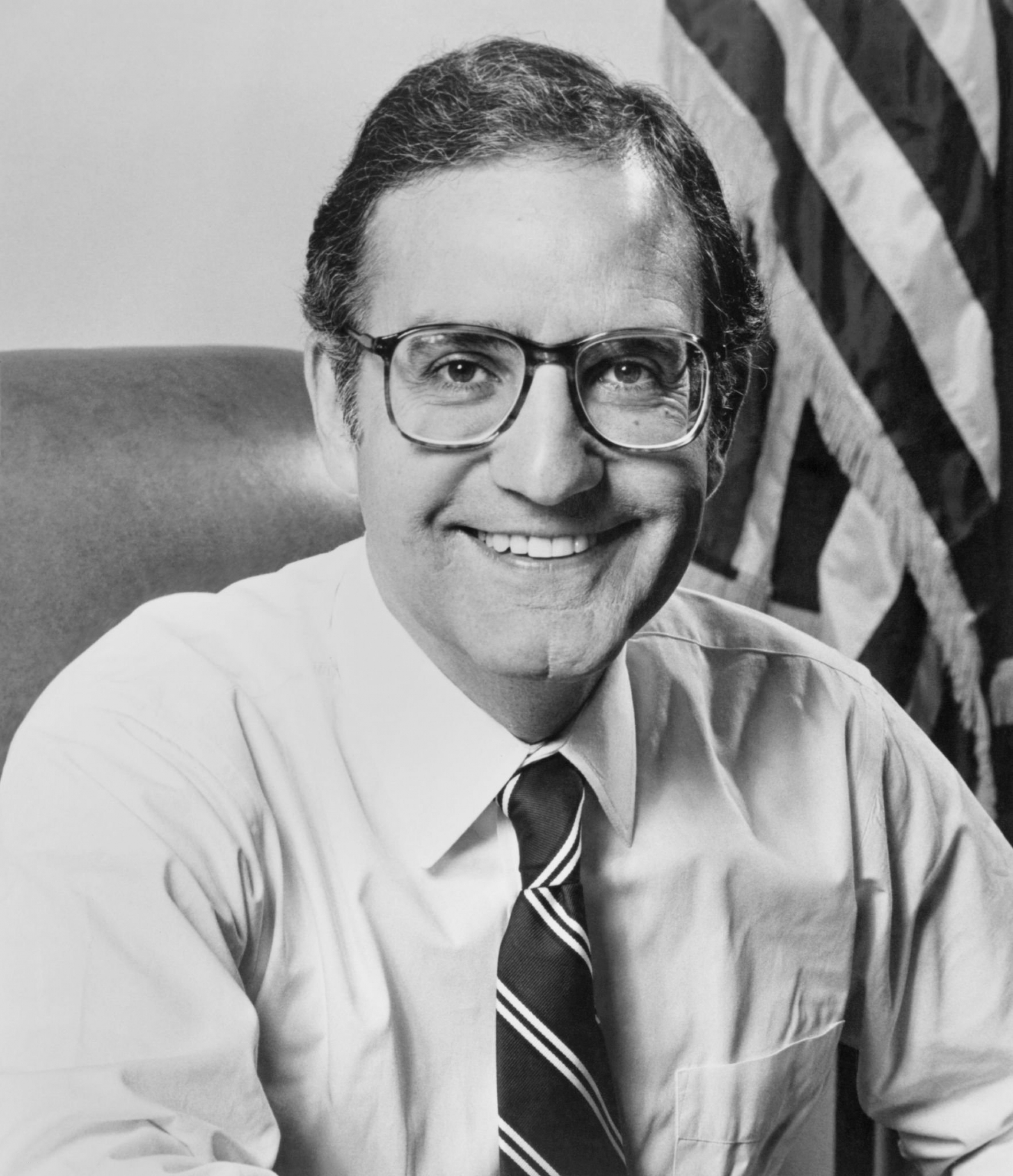
Democratic leader
George J. Mitchell

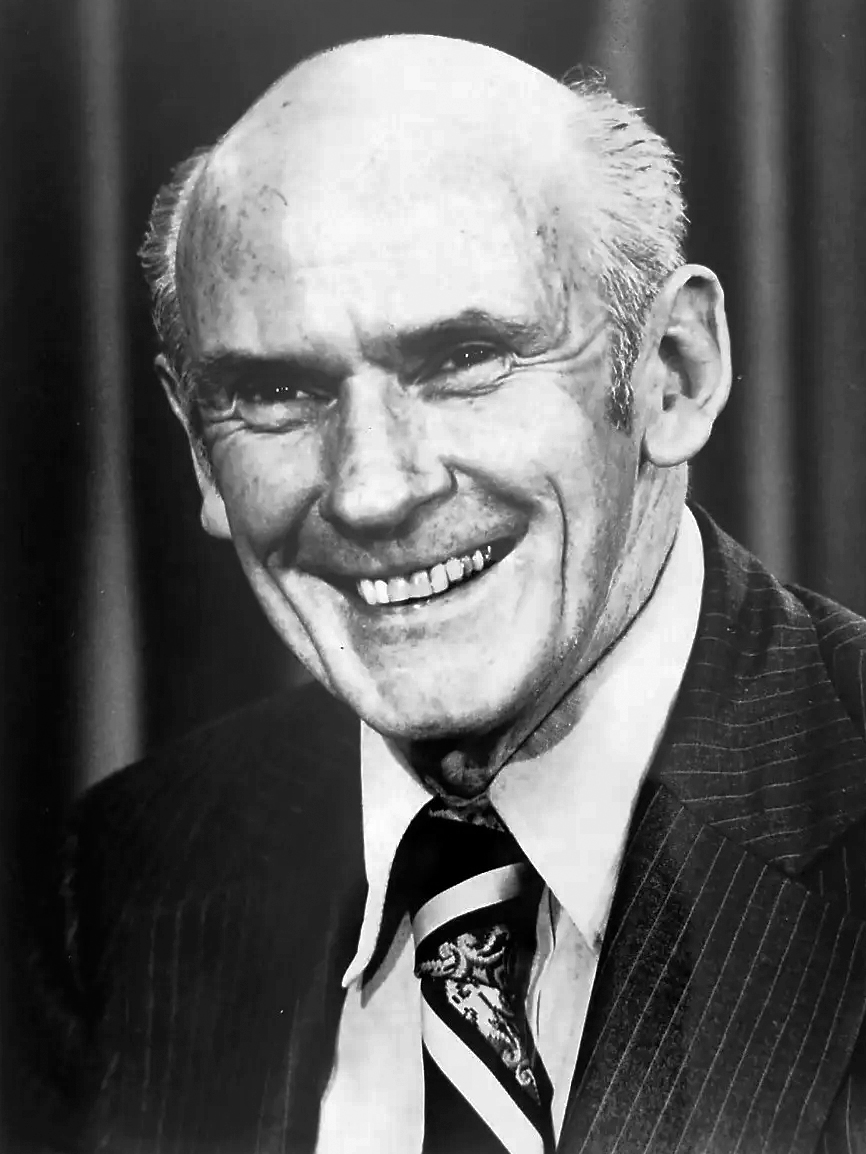
Democratic whip
Alan Cranston

Senate minority leadership

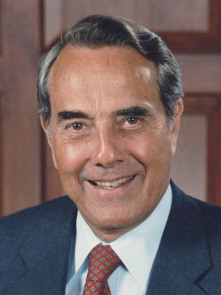
Republican leader
Bob Dole

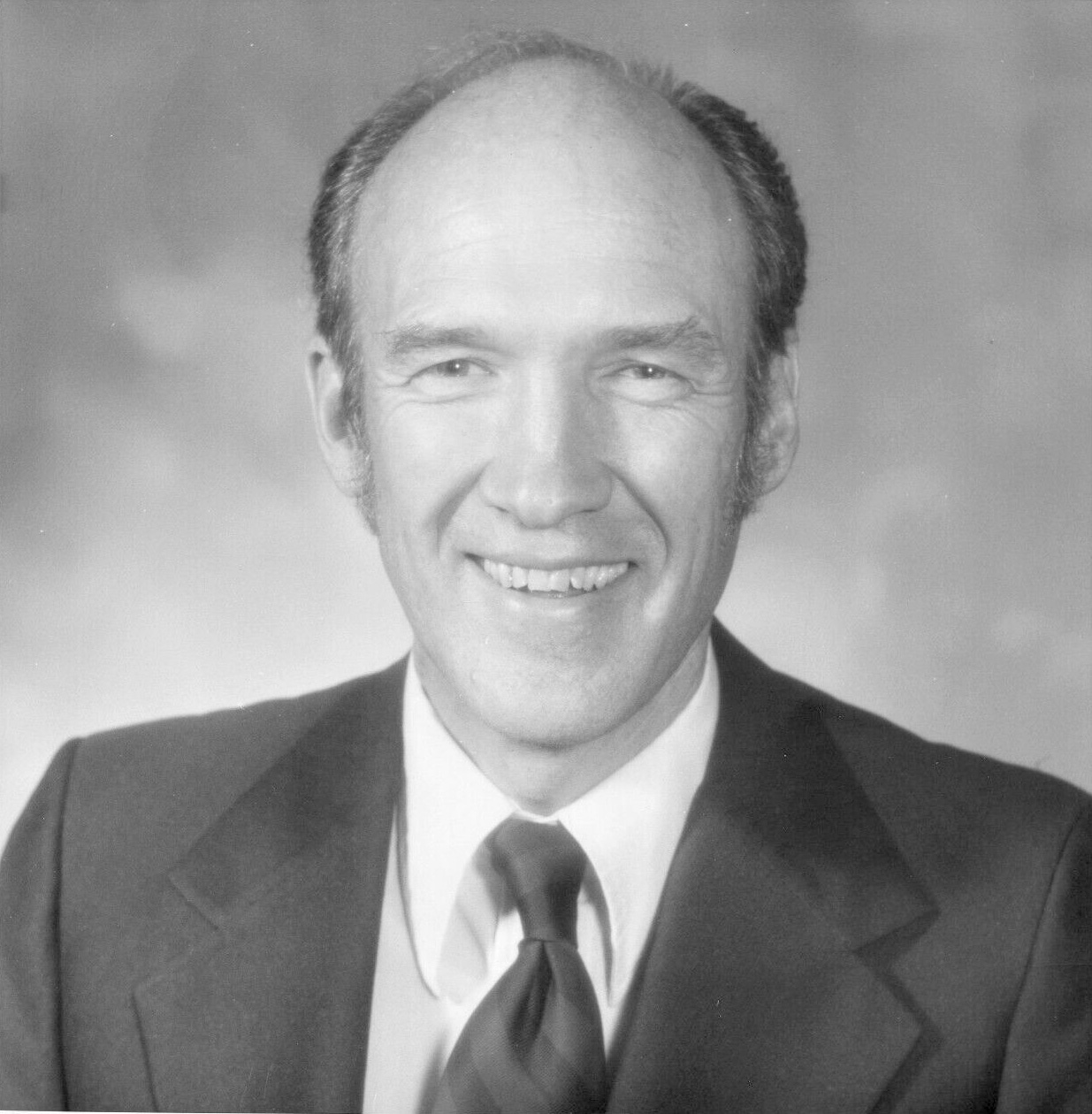
Republican whip
Alan Simpson

=== House of Representatives ===
The names of representatives are preceded by their district numbers.

==== Alabama ====
▌1. Sonny Callahan (R)
▌2. William Louis Dickinson (R)
▌3. Glen Browder (D), from April 4, 1989
▌4. Tom Bevill (D)
▌5. Ronnie Flippo (D)
▌6. Ben Erdreich (D)
▌7. Claude Harris Jr. (D)

==== Alaska ====
▌At-large. Don Young (R)

==== Arizona ====
▌1. John Jacob Rhodes III (R)
▌2. Mo Udall (D)
▌3. Bob Stump (R)
▌4. Jon Kyl (R)
▌5. Jim Kolbe (R)

==== Arkansas ====
▌1. William Vollie Alexander Jr. (D)
2. Tommy F. Robinson (D then R), switched parties July 28, 1989)
▌3. John Paul Hammerschmidt (R)
▌4. Beryl Anthony Jr. (D)

==== California ====
▌1. Douglas H. Bosco (D)
▌2. Wally Herger (R)
▌3. Bob Matsui (D)
▌4. Vic Fazio (D)
▌5. Nancy Pelosi (D)
▌6. Barbara Boxer (D)
▌7. George Miller (D)
▌8. Ron Dellums (D)
▌9. Pete Stark (D)
▌10. Don Edwards (D)
▌11. Tom Lantos (D)
▌12. Tom Campbell (R)
▌13. Norman Mineta (D)
▌14. Norman D. Shumway (R)
▌15. Tony Coelho (D), until June 15, 1989

▌Gary Condit (D), from September 12, 1989

▌16. Leon Panetta (D)
▌17. Chip Pashayan (R)
▌18. Richard H. Lehman (D)
▌19. Robert J. Lagomarsino (R)
▌20. Bill Thomas (R)
▌21. Elton Gallegly (R)
▌22. Carlos Moorhead (R)
▌23. Anthony Beilenson (D)
▌24. Henry Waxman (D)
▌25. Edward R. Roybal (D)
▌26. Howard Berman (D)
▌27. Mel Levine (D)
▌28. Julian Dixon (D)
▌29. Augustus Hawkins (D)
▌30. Matthew G. Martínez (D)
▌31. Mervyn Dymally (D)
▌32. Glenn M. Anderson (D)
▌33. David Dreier (R)
▌34. Esteban Edward Torres (D)
▌35. Jerry Lewis (R)
▌36. George Brown Jr. (D)
▌37. Al McCandless (R)
▌38. Bob Dornan (R)
▌39. William E. Dannemeyer (R)
▌40. Christopher Cox (R)
▌41. Bill Lowery (R)
▌42. Dana Rohrabacher (R)
▌43. Ron Packard (R)
▌44. Jim Bates (D)
▌45. Duncan L. Hunter (R)

==== Colorado ====
▌1. Pat Schroeder (D)
▌2. David Skaggs (D)
▌3. Ben Nighthorse Campbell (D)
▌4. Hank Brown (R)
▌5. Joel Hefley (R)
▌6. Dan Schaefer (R)

==== Connecticut ====
▌1. Barbara B. Kennelly (D)
▌2. Sam Gejdenson (D)
▌3. Bruce Morrison (D)
▌4. Chris Shays (R)
▌5. John G. Rowland (R)
▌6. Nancy Johnson (R)

==== Delaware ====
▌At-large. Tom Carper (D)

==== Florida ====
▌1. Earl Hutto (D)
▌▌2. Bill Grant (D then R), switched parties February 21, 1989
▌3. Charles E. Bennett (D)
▌4. Craig James (R)
▌5. Bill McCollum (R)
▌6. Cliff Stearns (R)
▌7. Sam Gibbons (D)
▌8. Bill Young (R)
▌9. Michael Bilirakis (R)
▌10. Andy Ireland (R)
▌11. Bill Nelson (D)
▌12. Tom Lewis (R)
▌13. Porter Goss (R)
▌14. Harry Johnston (D)
▌15. Clay Shaw (R)
▌16. Lawrence J. Smith (D)
▌17. William Lehman (D)
▌18. Claude Pepper (D), until May 30, 1989

▌Ileana Ros-Lehtinen (R), from August 29, 1989

▌19. Dante Fascell (D)

==== Georgia ====
▌1. Lindsay Thomas (D)
▌2. Charles Floyd Hatcher (D)
▌3. Richard Ray (D)
▌4. Ben Jones (D)
▌5. John Lewis (D)
▌6. Newt Gingrich (R)
▌7. George Darden (D)
▌8. J. Roy Rowland (D)
▌9. Ed Jenkins (D)
▌10. Doug Barnard Jr. (D)

==== Hawaii ====
▌1. Pat Saiki (R)
▌2. Daniel Akaka (D), until May 16, 1990

▌Patsy Mink (D), from September 22, 1990

==== Idaho ====
▌1. Larry Craig (R)
▌2. Richard H. Stallings (D)

==== Illinois ====
▌1. Charles Hayes (D)
▌2. Gus Savage (D)
▌3. Marty Russo (D)
▌4. George E. Sangmeister (D)
▌5. Bill Lipinski (D)
▌6. Henry Hyde (R)
▌7. Cardiss Collins (D)
▌8. Dan Rostenkowski (D)
▌9. Sidney R. Yates (D)
▌10. John Porter (R)
▌11. Frank Annunzio (D)
▌12. Phil Crane (R)
▌13. Harris W. Fawell (R)
▌14. Dennis Hastert (R)
▌15. Edward Madigan (R)
▌16. Lynn Morley Martin (R)
▌17. Lane Evans (D)
▌18. Robert H. Michel (R)
▌19. Terry L. Bruce (D)
▌20. Dick Durbin (D)
▌21. Jerry Costello (D)
▌22. Glenn Poshard (D)

==== Indiana ====
▌1. Pete Visclosky (D)
▌2. Philip Sharp (D)
▌3. John P. Hiler (R)
▌4. Jill L. Long (D), from March 28, 1989
▌5. Jim Jontz (D)
▌6. Dan Burton (R)
▌7. John T. Myers (R)
▌8. Frank McCloskey (D)
▌9. Lee H. Hamilton (D)
▌10. Andrew Jacobs Jr. (D)

==== Iowa ====
▌1. Jim Leach (R)
▌2. Tom Tauke (R)
▌3. David R. Nagle (D)
▌4. Neal Edward Smith (D)
▌5. Jim Ross Lightfoot (R)
▌6. Fred Grandy (R)

==== Kansas ====
▌1. Pat Roberts (R)
▌2. Jim Slattery (D)
▌3. Jan Meyers (R)
▌4. Dan Glickman (D)
▌5. Bob Whittaker (R)

==== Kentucky ====
▌1. Carroll Hubbard (D)
▌2. William Natcher (D)
▌3. Romano Mazzoli (D)
▌4. Jim Bunning (R)
▌5. Hal Rogers (R)
▌6. Larry J. Hopkins (R)
▌7. Chris Perkins (D)

==== Louisiana ====
▌1. Bob Livingston (R)
▌2. Lindy Boggs (D)
▌3. Billy Tauzin (D)
▌4. Jim McCrery (R)
▌5. Jerry Huckaby (D)
▌6. Richard Baker (R)
▌7. Jimmy Hayes (D)
▌8. Clyde C. Holloway (R)

==== Maine ====
▌1. Joseph E. Brennan (D)
▌2. Olympia Snowe (R)

==== Maryland ====
▌1. Roy Dyson (D)
▌2. Helen Delich Bentley (R)
▌3. Ben Cardin (D)
▌4. Tom McMillen (D)
▌5. Steny Hoyer (D)
▌6. Beverly Byron (D)
▌7. Kweisi Mfume (D)
▌8. Connie Morella (R)

==== Massachusetts ====
▌1. Silvio O. Conte (R)
▌2. Richard Neal (D)
▌3. Joseph D. Early (D)
▌4. Barney Frank (D)
▌5. Chester G. Atkins (D)
▌6. Nicholas Mavroules (D)
▌7. Ed Markey (D)
▌8. Joseph P. Kennedy II (D)
▌9. Joe Moakley (D)
▌10. Gerry Studds (D)
▌11. Brian J. Donnelly (D)

==== Michigan ====
▌1. John Conyers (D)
▌2. Carl Pursell (R)
▌3. Howard Wolpe (D)
▌4. Fred Upton (R)
▌5. Paul B. Henry (R)
▌6. Milton Robert Carr (D)
▌7. Dale Kildee (D)
▌8. J. Bob Traxler (D)
▌9. Guy Vander Jagt (R)
▌10. Bill Schuette (R)
▌11. Robert William Davis (R)
▌12. David Bonior (D)
▌13. George Crockett Jr. (D)
▌14. Dennis Hertel (D)
▌15. William D. Ford (D)
▌16. John Dingell (D)
▌17. Sander Levin (D)
▌18. William Broomfield (R)

==== Minnesota ====
▌1. Tim Penny (DFL)
▌2. Vin Weber (I-R)
▌3. Bill Frenzel (I-R)
▌4. Bruce Vento (DFL)
▌5. Martin Olav Sabo (DFL)
▌6. Gerry Sikorski (DFL)
▌7. Arlan Stangeland (I-R)
▌8. Jim Oberstar (DFL)

==== Mississippi ====
▌1. Jamie Whitten (D)
▌2. Mike Espy (D)
▌3. Sonny Montgomery (D)
▌4. Michael Parker (D)
▌5. Larkin I. Smith (R), until August 13, 1989

▌Gene Taylor (D), from October 17, 1989

==== Missouri ====
▌1. Bill Clay (D)
▌2. Jack Buechner (R)
▌3. Dick Gephardt (D)
▌4. Ike Skelton (D)
▌5. Alan Wheat (D)
▌6. Tom Coleman (R)
▌7. Mel Hancock (R)
▌8. Bill Emerson (R)
▌9. Harold Volkmer (D)

==== Montana ====
▌1. Pat Williams (D)
▌2. Ron Marlenee (R)

==== Nebraska ====
▌1. Doug Bereuter (R)
▌2. Peter Hoagland (D)
▌3. Virginia D. Smith (R)

==== Nevada ====
▌1. James Bilbray (D)
▌2. Barbara Vucanovich (R)

==== New Hampshire ====
▌1. Bob Smith (R), until December 7, 1990, vacant thereafter
▌2. Charles Douglas III (R)

==== New Jersey ====
▌1. James Florio (D), until January 16, 1990

▌Rob Andrews (D), from November 6, 1990

▌2. William J. Hughes (D)
▌3. Frank Pallone (D)
▌4. Chris Smith (R)
▌5. Marge Roukema (R)
▌6. Bernard J. Dwyer (D)
▌7. Matthew John Rinaldo (R)
▌8. Robert A. Roe (D)
▌9. Robert Torricelli (D)
▌10. Donald M. Payne (D)
▌11. Dean Gallo (R)
▌12. Jim Courter (R)
▌13. Jim Saxton (R)
▌14. Frank Joseph Guarini (D)

==== New Mexico ====
▌1. Steven Schiff (R)
▌2. Joe Skeen (R)
▌3. Bill Richardson (D)

==== New York ====
▌1. George J. Hochbrueckner (D)
▌2. Thomas Downey (D)
▌3. Robert J. Mrazek (D)
▌4. Norman F. Lent (R)
▌5. Raymond J. McGrath (R)
▌6. Floyd Flake (D)
▌7. Gary Ackerman (D)
▌8. James H. Scheuer (D)
▌9. Thomas J. Manton (D)
▌10. Chuck Schumer (D)
▌11. Edolphus Towns (D)
▌12. Major Owens (D)
▌13. Stephen Solarz (D)
▌14. Guy Molinari (R), until December 31, 1989 (resigned)

▌Susan Molinari (R), from March 20, 1990

▌15. Bill Green (R)
▌16. Charles Rangel (D)
▌17. Theodore S. Weiss (D)
▌18. Robert Garcia (D), until January 7, 1990

▌José E. Serrano (D), from March 20, 1990

▌19. Eliot Engel (D)
▌20. Nita Lowey (D)
▌21. Hamilton Fish IV (R)
▌22. Benjamin Gilman (R)
▌23. Michael McNulty (D)
▌24. Gerald Solomon (R)
▌25. Sherwood Boehlert (R)
▌26. David O'Brien Martin (R)
▌27. James T. Walsh (R)
▌28. Matthew F. McHugh (D)
▌29. Frank Horton (R)
▌30. Louise Slaughter (D)
▌31. Bill Paxon (R)
▌32. John J. LaFalce (D)
▌33. Henry J. Nowak (D)
▌34. Amo Houghton (R)

==== North Carolina ====
▌1. Walter B. Jones Sr. (D)
▌2. Tim Valentine (D)
▌3. Martin Lancaster (D)
▌4. David Price (D)
▌5. Stephen L. Neal (D)
▌6. Howard Coble (R)
▌7. Charlie Rose (D)
▌8. Bill Hefner (D)
▌9. Alex McMillan (R)
▌10. Cass Ballenger (R)
▌11. James M. Clarke (D)

==== North Dakota ====
▌At-large. Byron Dorgan (D-NPL)

==== Ohio ====
▌1. Tom Luken (D)
▌2. Bill Gradison (R)
▌3. Tony P. Hall (D)
▌4. Mike Oxley (R)
▌5. Paul Gillmor (R)
▌6. Bob McEwen (R)
▌7. Mike DeWine (R)
▌8. Donald "Buz" Lukens (R), until October 24, 1990
▌9. Marcy Kaptur (D)
▌10. Clarence E. Miller (R)
▌11. Dennis E. Eckart (D)
▌12. John Kasich (R)
▌13. Donald J. Pease (D)
▌14. Thomas C. Sawyer (D)
▌15. Chalmers Wylie (R)
▌16. Ralph Regula (R)
▌17. James Traficant (D)
▌18. Douglas Applegate (D)
▌19. Ed Feighan (D)
▌20. Mary Rose Oakar (D)
▌21. Louis Stokes (D)

==== Oklahoma ====
▌1. Jim Inhofe (R)
▌2. Mike Synar (D)
▌3. Wes Watkins (D)
▌4. Dave McCurdy (D)
▌5. Mickey Edwards (R)
▌6. Glenn English (D)

==== Oregon ====
▌1. Les AuCoin (D)
▌2. Robert Freeman Smith (R)
▌3. Ron Wyden (D)
▌4. Peter DeFazio (D)
▌5. Denny Smith (R)

==== Pennsylvania ====
▌1. Thomas M. Foglietta (D)
▌2. William H. Gray III (D)
▌3. Robert A. Borski Jr. (D)
▌4. Joseph P. Kolter (D)
▌5. Richard T. Schulze (R)
▌6. Gus Yatron (D)
▌7. Curt Weldon (R)
▌8. Peter H. Kostmayer (D)
▌9. Bud Shuster (R)
▌10. Joseph M. McDade (R)
▌11. Paul Kanjorski (D)
▌12. John Murtha (D)
▌13. Lawrence Coughlin (R)
▌14. William J. Coyne (D)
▌15. Donald L. Ritter (R)
▌16. Robert Smith Walker (R)
▌17. George Gekas (R)
▌18. Doug Walgren (D)
▌19. William F. Goodling (R)
▌20. Joseph M. Gaydos (D)
▌21. Tom Ridge (R)
▌22. Austin Murphy (D)
▌23. William F. Clinger Jr. (R)

==== Rhode Island ====
▌1. Ronald Machtley (R)
▌2. Claudine Schneider (R)

==== South Carolina ====
▌1. Arthur Ravenel Jr. (R)
▌2. Floyd Spence (R)
▌3. Butler Derrick (D)
▌4. Liz J. Patterson (D)
▌5. John Spratt (D)
▌6. Robin Tallon (D)

==== South Dakota ====
▌At-large. Tim Johnson (D)

==== Tennessee ====
▌1. Jimmy Quillen (R)
▌2. Jimmy Duncan (R)
▌3. Marilyn Lloyd (D)
▌4. Jim Cooper (D)
▌5. Bob Clement (D)
▌6. Bart Gordon (D)
▌7. Don Sundquist (R)
▌8. John S. Tanner (D)
▌9. Harold Ford Sr. (D)

==== Texas ====
▌1. Jim Chapman (D)
▌2. Charlie Wilson (D)
▌3. Steve Bartlett (R)
▌4. Ralph Hall (D)
▌5. John Wiley Bryant (D)
▌6. Joe Barton (R)
▌7. Bill Archer (R)
▌8. Jack Fields (R)
▌9. Jack Brooks (D)
▌10. J. J. Pickle (D)
▌11. Marvin Leath (D)
▌12. Jim Wright (D), until June 30, 1989

▌Pete Geren (D), from September 12, 1989

▌13. Bill Sarpalius (D)
▌14. Greg Laughlin (D)
▌15. Kika de la Garza (D)
▌16. Ronald D. Coleman (D)
▌17. Charles Stenholm (D)
▌18. Mickey Leland (D), until August 7, 1989

▌Craig Washington (D), from December 9, 1989

▌19. Larry Combest (R)
▌20. Henry B. González (D)
▌21. Lamar Smith (R)
▌22. Tom DeLay (R)
▌23. Albert Bustamante (D)
▌24. Martin Frost (D)
▌25. Michael A. Andrews (D)
▌26. Dick Armey (R)
▌27. Solomon P. Ortiz (D)

==== Utah ====
▌1. James V. Hansen (R)
▌2. Wayne Owens (D)
▌3. Howard C. Nielson (R)

==== Vermont ====
▌At-large. Peter Plympton Smith (R)

==== Virginia ====
▌1. Herbert H. Bateman (R)
▌2. Owen B. Pickett (D)
▌3. Thomas J. Bliley Jr. (R)
▌4. Norman Sisisky (D)
▌5. Lewis F. Payne Jr. (D)
▌6. Jim Olin (D)
▌7. D. French Slaughter Jr. (R)
▌8. Stanford Parris (R)
▌9. Rick Boucher (D)
▌10. Frank Wolf (R)

==== Washington ====
▌1. John Miller (R)
▌2. Al Swift (D)
▌3. Jolene Unsoeld (D)
▌4. Sid Morrison (R)
▌5. Tom Foley (D)
▌6. Norm Dicks (D)
▌7. Jim McDermott (D)
▌8. Rod Chandler (R)

==== West Virginia ====
▌1. Alan Mollohan (D)
▌2. Harley O. Staggers Jr. (D)
▌3. Bob Wise (D)
▌4. Nick Rahall (D)

==== Wisconsin ====
▌1. Les Aspin (D)
▌2. Robert Kastenmeier (D)
▌3. Steve Gunderson (R)
▌4. Jerry Kleczka (D)
▌5. Jim Moody (D)
▌6. Tom Petri (R)
▌7. Dave Obey (D)
▌8. Toby Roth (R)
▌9. Jim Sensenbrenner (R)

==== Wyoming ====
▌At-large. Dick Cheney (R), until March 17, 1989

▌Craig L. Thomas (R), from April 26, 1989

==== Non-voting members ====
▌American Samoa: Eni Faleomavaega (D)
▌District of Columbia: Walter Fauntroy (D)
▌Guam: Vicente T. Blaz (R)
▌Puerto Rico: Jaime Fuster (PPD)
▌Virgin Islands: Ron de Lugo (D)

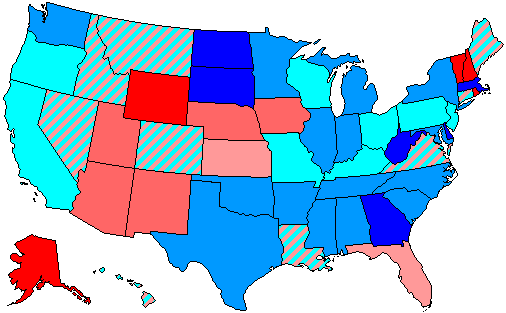
House seats by party holding plurality in state: 80+ to 100% Democratic / 80+ to 100% Republican; 60+ to 80% Democratic / 60+ to 80% Republican; Up to 60% Democratic / Up to 60% Republican; striped: 50–50 split

House majority leadership

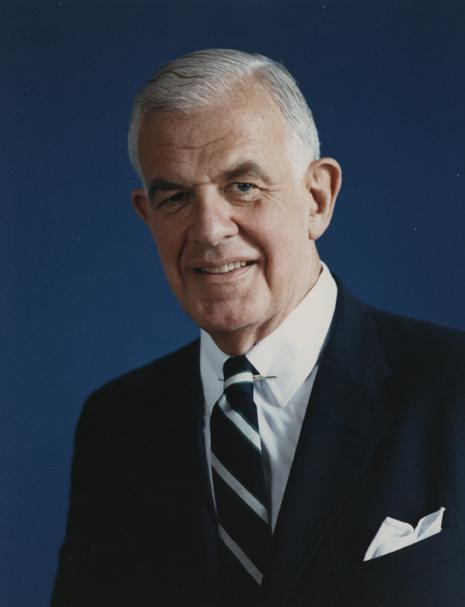
Democratic leader
(until June 6, 1989)
Tom Foley

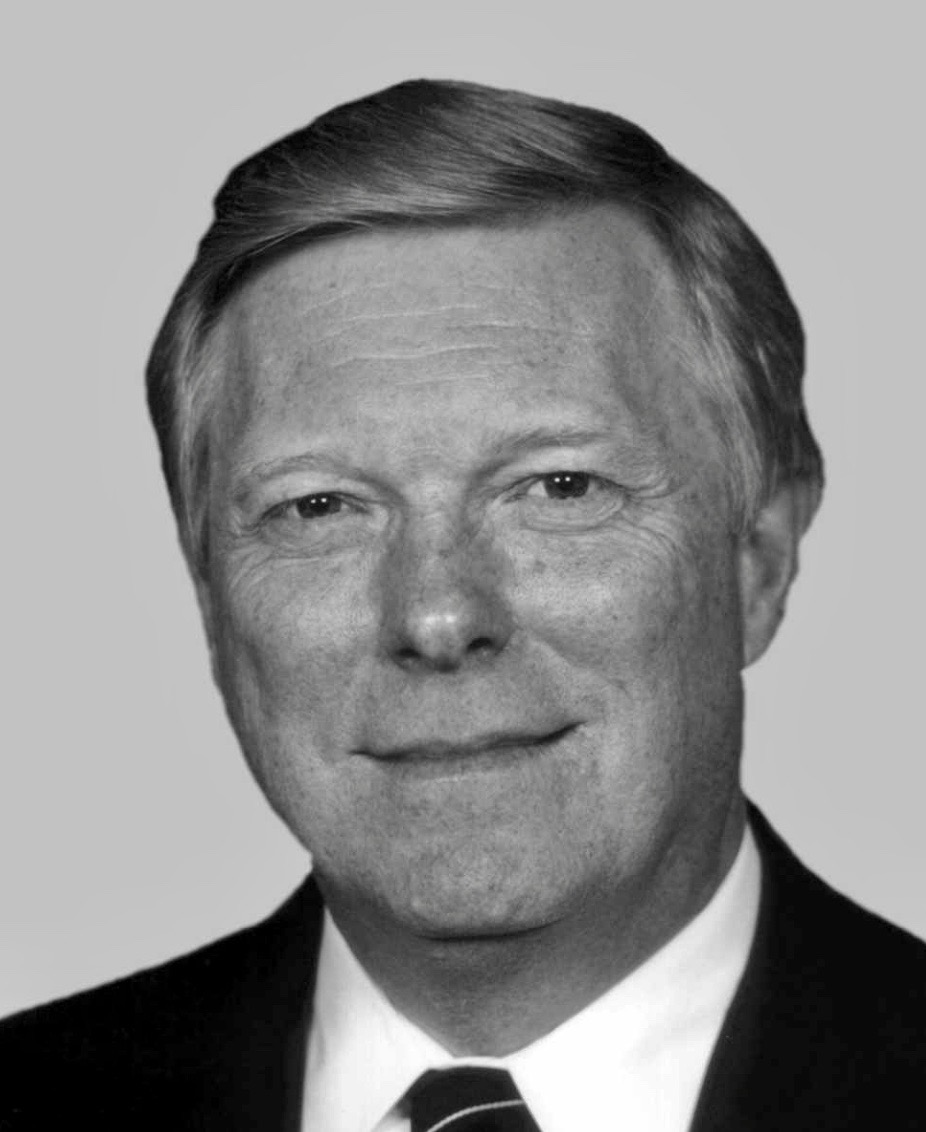
Democratic leader
(after June 6, 1989)
Dick Gephardt

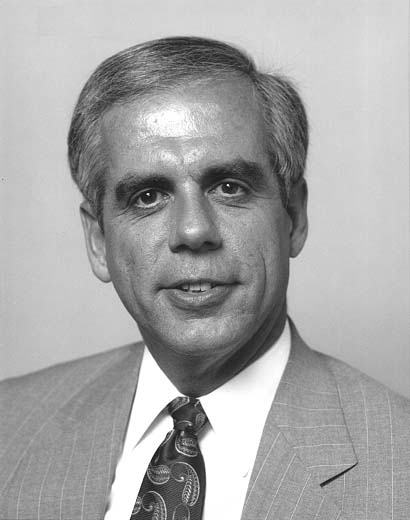
Democratic whip
(until June 15, 1989)
Tony Coelho

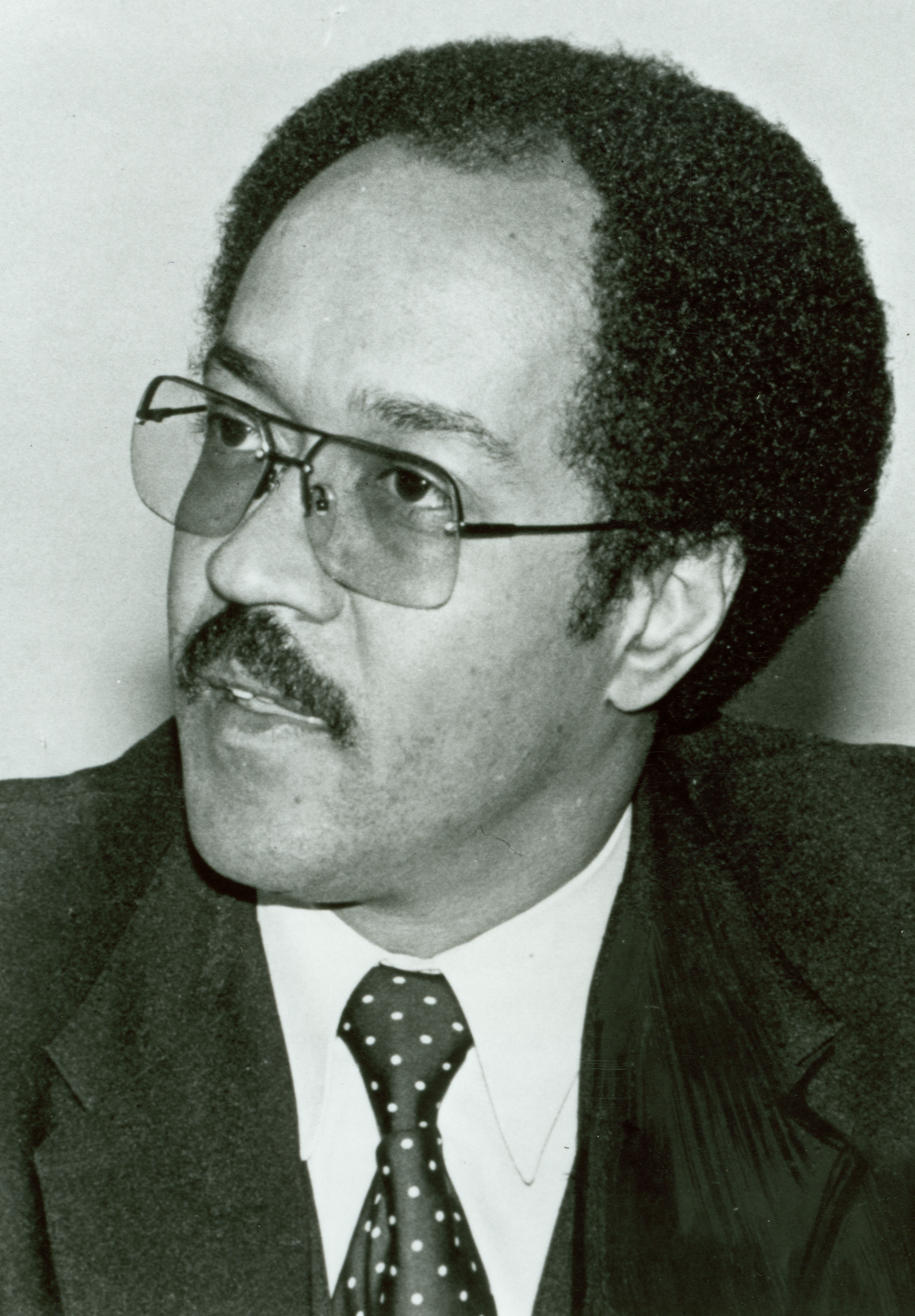
Democratic whip
(after June 15, 1989)
Bill Gray

House minority leadership

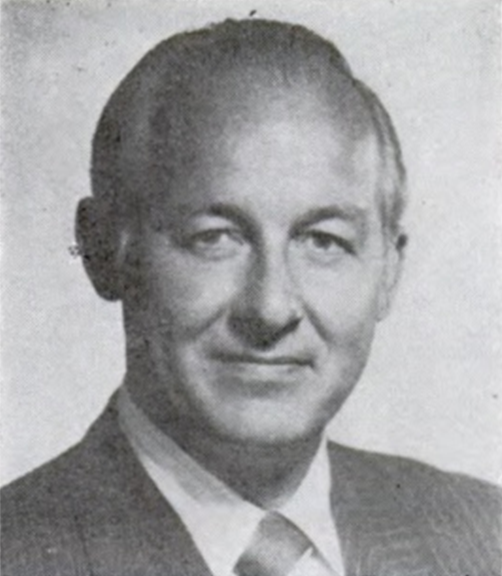
Republican leader
Bob Michel

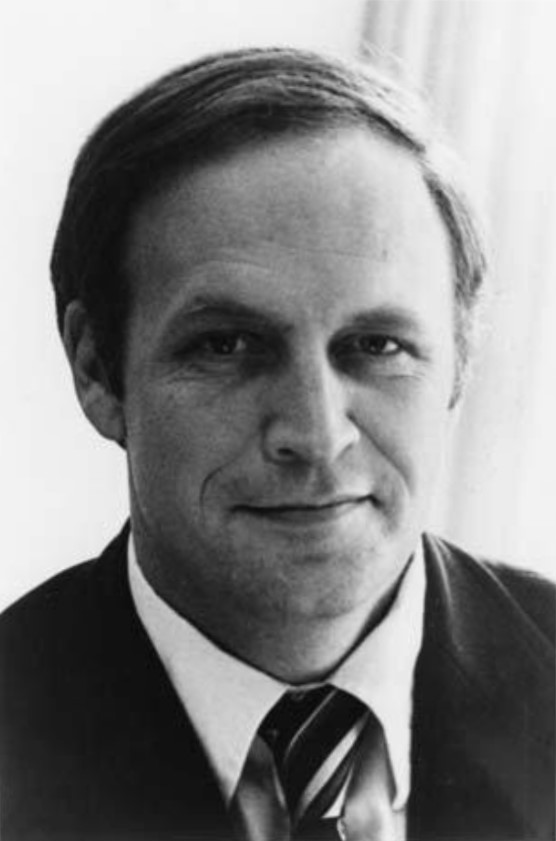
Republican whip
(until March 20, 1989)
Dick Cheney

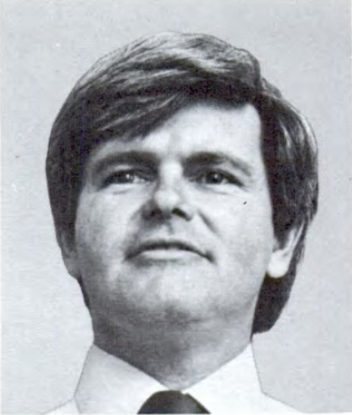
Republican whip
(after March 20, 1989)
Newt Gingrich

== Changes in membership ==
=== Senate ===
Senate changes
State (class)	Vacated by	Reason for change	Successor	Date of successor's formal installation (Note: When seated or oath administered, not necessarily when service began.)
Indiana (3)	Dan Quayle (R)	Resigned January 3, 1989, to become U.S. Vice President. Successor was appointed and later elected to finish the term ending January 3, 1993.	Dan Coats (R)	January 3, 1989
Hawaii (1)	Spark Matsunaga (D)	Died April 15, 1990. Successor was appointed and later elected to finish the term ending January 3, 1995.	Daniel Akaka (D)	May 16, 1990
New Hampshire (2)	Gordon J. Humphrey (R)	Retired and resigned early December 4, 1990, having been elected to the New Hampshire Senate. Successor was appointed, having already elected to the next term.	Bob Smith (R)	December 7, 1990

=== House of Representatives ===
House changes
District	Vacated by	Reason for change	Successor	Date of successor's formal installation
Alabama 3	Vacant	Rep. Bill Nichols died during previous congress. New member elected April 4, 1989.	Glen Browder (D)	April 4, 1989
Indiana 4	Dan Coats (R)	Resigned January 3, 1989, to become U.S. Senator. New member elected March 28, 1989.	Jill Long (D)	March 28, 1989
Florida 2	Bill Grant (D)	Changed party February 21, 1989.	Bill Grant (R)	February 21, 1989
Wyoming at-large	Dick Cheney (R)	Resigned March 17, 1989, to become U.S. Secretary of Defense. New member elected April 26, 1989.	Craig L. Thomas (R)	April 26, 1989
Florida 18	Claude Pepper (D)	Died May 30, 1989. New member elected August 29, 1989.	Ileana Ros-Lehtinen (R)	August 29, 1989
California 15	Tony Coelho (D)	Resigned June 15, 1989. New member elected September 12, 1989.	Gary Condit (D)	September 12, 1989
Texas 12	Jim Wright (D)	Resigned June 30, 1989. New member elected September 12, 1989.	Pete Geren (D)	September 12, 1989
Arkansas 2	Tommy F. Robinson (D)	Changed party July 28, 1989.	Tommy F. Robinson (R)	July 28, 1989
Texas 18	Mickey Leland (D)	Died August 7, 1989. New member elected December 9, 1989.	Craig Washington (D)	December 9, 1989
Mississippi 5	Larkin I. Smith (R)	Died August 13, 1989. New member elected October 17, 1989.	Gene Taylor (D)	October 17, 1989
New York 14	Guy Molinari (R)	Resigned December 31, 1989. New member elected March 20, 1990.	Susan Molinari (R)	March 20, 1990
New York 18	Robert Garcia (D)	Resigned January 7, 1990. New member elected March 20, 1990.	José E. Serrano (D)	March 20, 1990
New Jersey 1	James Florio (D)	Resigned January 16, 1990, after being elected Governor of New Jersey. New member elected November 6, 1990.	Rob Andrews (D)	November 6, 1990
Hawaii 2	Daniel Akaka (D)	Resigned May 15, 1990, to become U.S. Senator. New member elected November 6, 1990.	Patsy Mink (D)	November 6, 1990
Ohio 8	Donald "Buz" Lukens (R)	Resigned October 24, 1990.	Vacant	Not filled this term
New Hampshire 1	Bob Smith (R)	Resigned December 7, 1990, to become U.S. Senator.	Vacant	Not filled this term

== Committees ==
Lists of committees and their party leaders for members of the House and Senate committees can be found through the Official Congressional Directory at the bottom of this article. The directory after the pages of terms of service lists committees of the Senate, House (Standing with Subcommittees, Select and Special) and Joint and, after that, House/Senate committee assignments. On the committees section of the House and Senate in the Official Congressional Directory, the committee's members on the first row on the left side shows the chairman of the committee and on the right side shows the ranking member of the committee.

=== Senate ===
- Aging (Special) (Chair: David Pryor; Ranking Member: H. John Heinz III)
- Agriculture, Nutrition and Forestry (Chair: Patrick Leahy; Ranking Member: Richard G. Lugar)
  - Agriculture Credit (Chair: Kent Conrad; Ranking Member: Slade Gorton)
  - Agricultural Production and Stabilization of Prices (Chair: David Pryor; Ranking Member: Jesse Helms)
  - Agricultural Research and General Legislation (Chair: Tom Daschle; Ranking Member: Pete Wilson)
  - Conservation and Forestry (Chair: Wyche Fowler; Ranking Member: Kit Bond)
  - Domestic, Foreign Marketing and Product Promotion (Chair: David Boren; Ranking Member: Thad Cochran)
  - Nutrition and Investigations (Chair: Tom Harkin; Ranking Member: Rudy Boschwitz)
  - Rural Development and Rural Electrification (Chair: Howell Heflin; Ranking Member: Mitch McConnell)
- Appropriations (Chair: Robert Byrd; Ranking Member: Mark O. Hatfield)
  - Agriculture and Related Agencies (Chair: Quentin Burdick; Ranking Member: Thad Cochran)
  - Commerce, Justice, State and Judiciary (Chair: Ernest Hollings; Ranking Member: Warren Rudman)
  - Defense (Chair: Daniel Inouye; Ranking Member: Ted Stevens)
  - District of Columbia (Chair: Brock Adams; Ranking Member: Phil Gramm)
  - Energy and Water Development (Chair: J. Bennett Johnston; Ranking Member: Mark O. Hatfield)
  - Foreign Operations (Chair: Patrick Leahy; Ranking Member: Bob Kasten)
  - HUD-Independent Agencies (Chair: Barbara Mikulski; Ranking Member: Jake Garn)
  - Interior and Related Agencies (Chair: Robert C. Byrd; Ranking Member: James A. McClure)
  - Labor, Health, Human Services, Education and Related Agencies (Chair: Tom Harkin; Ranking Member: Arlen Specter)
  - Legislative Branch (Chair: Harry Reid; Ranking Member: Don Nickles)
  - Military Construction (Chair: Jim Sasser; Ranking Member: Chuck Grassley)
  - Transportation and Related Agencies (Chair: Frank Lautenberg; Ranking Member: Al D'Amato)
  - Treasury, Postal Service and General Government (Chair: Dennis DeConcini; Ranking Member: Pete Domenici)
- Armed Services (Chair: Sam Nunn; Ranking Member: John W. Warner)
  - Strategic Forces and Nuclear Detterence (Chair: J. James Exon; Ranking Member: Strom Thurmond)
  - Conventional Forces and Alliance Defense (Chair: Carl Levin; Ranking Member: Pete Wilson)
  - Projection Forces and Regional Defense (Chair: Ted Kennedy; Ranking Member: William S. Cohen)
  - Defense Industry and Technology (Chair: Jeff Bingaman; Ranking Member: Malcolm Wallop)
  - Readiness, Sustainability and Support (Chair: Alan J. Dixon; Ranking Member: Slade Gorton)
  - Manpower and Personnel (Chair: Alan J. Dixon; Ranking Member: John McCain)
- Banking, Housing and Urban Affairs (Chair: Donald W. Riegle Jr.; Ranking Member: Jake Garn)
  - Housing and Urban Affairs (Chair: Alan Cranston; Ranking Member: Al D'Amato)
  - International Finance and Monetary Policy (Chair: Paul Sarbanes; Ranking Member: Phil Gramm)
  - Securities (Chair: Chris Dodd; Ranking Member: H. John Heinz III)
  - Consumer and Regulatory Affairs (Chair: Alan Dixon; Ranking Member: Kit Bond)
- Budget (Chair: Jim Sasser; Ranking Member: Pete Domenici)
- Commerce, Science and Transportation (Chair: Ernest Hollings; Ranking Member: John C. Danforth)
  - Aviation (Chair: Wendell H. Ford; Ranking Member: John McCain)
  - Communications (Chair: Daniel Inouye; Ranking Member: Bob Packwood)
  - Consumer (Chair: Richard H. Bryan; Ranking Member: Slade Gorton)
  - Foreign Commerce and Tourism (Chair: Jay Rockefeller; Ranking Member: Conrad Burns)
  - Merchant Marine (Chair: John Breaux; Ranking Member: Trent Lott)
  - Science, Technology and Space (Chair: Al Gore; Ranking Member: Larry Pressler)
  - Surface Transportation (Chair: J. James Exon; Ranking Member: Bob Kasten)
  - National Ocean Policy Study (Chair: Ernest Hollings; Ranking Member: Ted Stevens)
- Energy and Natural Resources (Chair: J. Bennett Johnston; Ranking Member: James A. McClure)
  - Energy Regulation and Conservation (Chair: Howard M. Metzenbaum; Ranking Member: Don Nickles)
  - Energy Research and Development (Chair: Wendell H. Ford; Ranking Member: Pete Domenici)
  - Natural Resources Development and Production (Chair: Jeff Bingaman; Ranking Member: Frank H. Murkowski)
  - Public Lands, National Parks and Forests (Chair: Dale Bumpers; Ranking Member: Malcolm Wallop)
  - Water and Power (Chair: Bill Bradley; Ranking Member: Conrad Burns)
- Environment and Public Works (Chair: Quentin N. Burdick; Ranking Member: )
  - Environmental Protection (Chair: Max Baucus; Ranking Member: John H. Chafee)
  - Nuclear Regulation (Chair: John Breaux; Ranking Member: Alan K. Simpson)
  - Superfund, Ocean and Water Protection (Chair: Frank Lautenberg; Ranking Member: David Durenberger)
  - Toxic Substances, Environmental Oversight, Research and Development (Chair: Harry Reid; Ranking Member: John W. Warner)
  - Water Resources, Transportation and Infrastructure (Chair: Daniel Moynihan; Ranking Member: Steve Symms)
- Ethics (Select) (Chair: Howell Heflin; Ranking Member: Warren Rudman)
- Finance (Chair: Lloyd Bentsen; Ranking Member: Bob Packwood)
  - Energy and Agricultural Taxation (Chair: David L. Boren; Ranking Member: William L. Armstrong)
  - Health for Families and the Uninsured (Chair: Donald W. Riegle Jr.; Ranking Member: John H. Chafee)
  - International Debt (Chair: Bill Bradley; Ranking Member: Bob Dole)
  - International Trade (Chair: Max Baucus; Ranking Member: John C. Danforth)
  - Medicare and Long Term Care (Chair: Jay Rockefeller; Ranking Member: David Durenberger)
  - Private Retirement Plans and Oversight of the Internal Revenue Service (Chair: David Pryor; Ranking Member: H. John Heinz III)
  - Social Security and Family Policy (Chair: Daniel Moynihan; Ranking Member: Bob Dole)
  - Taxation and Debt Management (Chair: Spark Matsunaga; Ranking Member: William V. Roth Jr.)
- Foreign Relations (Chair: Claiborne Pell; Ranking Member: Jesse Helms)
  - African Affairs (Chair: Paul Simon; Ranking Member: Nancy Kassebaum)
  - East Asian and Pacific Affairs (Chair: Alan Cranston; Ranking Member: Frank H. Murkowski)
  - European Affairs (Chair: Joe Biden; Ranking Member: Larry Pressler)
  - International Economic Policy, Trade, Oceans and Environment (Chair: Paul Sarbanes; Ranking Member: Gordon J. Humphrey)
  - Near Eastern and South Asian Affairs (Chair: Daniel Moynihan; Ranking Member: Rudy Boschwitz)
  - Terrorism, Narcotics and International Communications (Chair: John Kerry; Ranking Member: Mitch McConnell)
  - Western Hemisphere and Peace Corps Affairs (Chair: Chris Dodd; Ranking Member: Richard G. Lugar)
- Governmental Affairs (Chair: John Glenn; Ranking Member: William V. Roth Jr.)
  - Federal Services, Post Office and Civil Service (Chair: David Pryor; Ranking Member: Ted Stevens)
  - General Services, Federalism and the District of Columbia (Chair: Jim Sasser; Ranking Member: H. John Heinz III)
  - Government Information and Regulation (Chair: Jeff Bingaman; Ranking Member: Warren Rudman)
  - Oversight of Government Management (Chair: Carl Levin; Ranking Member: William S. Cohen)
  - Permanent Subcommittee on Investigations (Chair: Sam Nunn; Ranking Member: William V. Roth Jr.)
- Indian Affairs (Select) (Chair: Daniel Inouye; Ranking Member: John McCain)
- Judiciary (Chair: Joe Biden; Ranking Member: Strom Thurmond)
  - Antitrust, Monopolies and Business Rights (Chair: Howard M. Metzenbaum; Ranking Member: Strom Thurmond)
  - Courts and Administration Practice (Chair: Howell Heflin; Ranking Member: Chuck Grassley)
  - Constitution (Chair: Paul Simon; Ranking Member: Arlen Specter)
  - Immigration and Refugee Affairs (Chair: Ted Kennedy; Ranking Member: Alan K. Simpson)
  - Patents, Copyrights and Trademarks (Chair: Dennis DeConcini; Ranking Member: Orrin G. Hatch)
  - Technology and the Law (Chair: Patrick Leahy; Ranking Member: Gordon J. Humphrey)
- Impeachment of Alcee L. Hastings (Select) (Chair: [data missing]; Ranking Member: [data missing])
- Impeachment of Walter L. Nixon (Select) (Chair: [data missing]; Ranking Member: [data missing])
- Intelligence (Select) (Chair: David L. Boren; Ranking Member: William S. Cohen)
- Labor and Human Resources (Chair: Ted Kennedy; Ranking Member: Orrin Hatch)
  - Aging (Chair: Spark Matsuaga; Ranking Member: Thad Cochran)
  - Children, Family, Drugs and Alcoholism (Chair: Chris Dodd; Ranking Member: Dan Coats)
  - Education, Arts and Humanities (Chair: Claiborne Pell; Ranking Member: Nancy Kassebaum)
  - Employment and Productivity (Chair: Paul Simon; Ranking Member: Strom Thurmond)
  - Handicapped (Chair: Tom Harkin; Ranking Member: David Durenberger)
  - Labor (Chair: Howard M. Metzenbaum; Ranking Member: Jim Jeffords)
- Nutrition and Human Needs (Select) (Chair: [data missing]; Ranking Member: [data missing])
- Rules and Administration (Chair: Wendell H. Ford; Ranking Member: Ted Stevens)
- Small Business (Chair: Dale Bumpers; Ranking Member: Rudy Boschwitz)
  - Competition and Antitrust Enforcement (Chair: Tom Harkin; Ranking Member: Ted Stevens)
  - Export Expansion (Chair: Barbara Mikulski; Ranking Member: Larry Pressler)
  - Government Contracting and Paperwork Reduction (Chair: Alan Dixon; Ranking Member: Chuck Grassley)
  - Innovation, Technology and Productivity (Chair: Carl Levin; Ranking Member: Trent Lott)
  - Rural Economy and Family Farming (Chair: Max Baucus; Ranking Member: Bob Kasten)
  - Urban and Minority-Owned Business Development (Chair: John Kerry; Ranking Member: Conrad Burns)
- Veterans' Affairs (Chair: Alan Cranston; Ranking Member: Frank H. Murkowski)

=== House of Representatives ===
- Aging (Select) (Chair: Edward R. Roybal; Ranking Member: Matthew J. Rinaldo)
- Agriculture (Chair: Kika de la Garza; Ranking Member: Edward Madigan)
  - Conservation, Credit and Rural Development (Chair: Glenn English; Ranking Member: E. Thomas Coleman)
  - Cotton, Rice and Sugar (Chair: Jerry Huckaby; Ranking Member: Arlan Stangeland)
  - Department Operations, Research and Foreign Agriculture (Chair: Jerry Huckaby; Ranking Member: Pat Roberts)
  - Domestic Marketing, Consumer Relations and Nutrition (Chair: George E. Brown Jr.; Ranking Member: Bill Emerson)
  - Forests, Family Farms and Energy (Chair: Harold Volkmer; Ranking Member: Sid Morrison)
  - Livestock, Dairy and Poultry (Chair: Charles Stenholm; Ranking Member: Steve Gunderson)
  - Tobacco and Peanuts (Chair: Charlie Rose; Ranking Member: Larry J. Hopkins)
  - Wheat, Soybeans and Feed Grains (Chair: Dan Glickman; Ranking Member: Ron Marlenee)
- Appropriations (Chair: Jamie L. Whitten; Ranking Member: Silvio O. Conte)
  - Commerce, Justice, State and the Judiciary (Chair: Neal Edward Smith; Ranking Member: Hal Rogers)
  - Defense (Chair: John Murtha; Ranking Member: Joseph M. McDade)
  - District of Columbia (Chair: Julian C. Dixon; Ranking Member: Dean A. Gallo)
  - Energy and Water Development (Chair: Tom Bevill; Ranking Member: John T. Myers)
  - Foreign Operations, Export Financing and Related Programs (Chair: David Obey; Ranking Member: Mickey Edwards)
  - Interior and Related Agencies (Chair: Sidney Yates; Ranking Member: Ralph Regula)
  - Labor, Health, Human Services, Education and Related Agencies (Chair: William H. Natcher; Ranking Member: Silvio O. Conte)
  - Legislative (Chair: Victor Fazio; Ranking Member: Jerry Lewis)
  - Military Construction (Chair: Bill Hefner; Ranking Member: Bill Lowery)
  - Agriculture, Rural Development and Related Agencies (Chair: Jamie L. Whitten; Ranking Member: Virginia Smith)
  - Transportation (Chair: William Lehman; Ranking Member: Lawrence Coughlin)
  - Treasury, Postal Service and General Government (Chair: Edward R. Roybal; Ranking Member: Joe Skeen)
  - VA, HUD and Independent Agencies (Chair: J. Bob Traxler; Ranking Member: Bill Green)
- Armed Services (Chair: Les Aspin; Ranking Member: William L. Dickinson)
  - Investigations (Chair: Nicholas Mavroules; Ranking Member: Larry J. Hopkins)
  - Military Installations and Facilities (Chair: Patricia Schroeder; Ranking Member: David O'B. Martin)
  - Military Personnel and Compensation (Chair: Beverly B. Byron; Ranking Member: Herbert H. Bateman)
  - Procurement and Military Nuclear Systems (Chair: Les Aspin; Ranking Member: Jim Courter)
  - Readiness (Chair: Earl Hutto; Ranking Member: John R. Kasich)
  - Research and Development (Chair: Ron Dellums; Ranking Member: William L. Dickinson)
  - Seapower, Strategic and Critical Materials (Chair: Charles E. Bennett; Ranking Member: Floyd Spence)
- Banking, Finance and Urban Affairs (Chair: Henry B. Gonzalez; Ranking Member: Chalmers P. Wylie)
  - Consumer Affairs and Coinage (Chair: Richard H. Lehman; Ranking Member: John P. Hiler)
  - Domestic Monetary Policy (Chair: Stephen L. Neal; Ranking Member: Bill McCollum)
  - Economic Stabilization (Chair: Mary Rose Oakar; Ranking Member: Norman D. Shumway)
  - Financial Institutions Supervision, Regulation and Insurance (Chair: Frank Annunzio; Ranking Member: Chalmers P. Wylie)
  - General Oversight and Investigations (Chair: Carroll Hubbard; Ranking Member: Stanford Parris)
  - International Development, Finance, Trade and Monetary Policy (Chair: Walter E. Fauntroy; Ranking Member: Marge Roukema)
  - Housing and Community Development (Chair: Henry B. Gonzalez; Ranking Member: Jim Leach)
  - Policy Research and Insurance (Chair: Ben Erdreich; Ranking Member: Doug Bereuter)
- Budget (Chair: Leon Panetta; Ranking Member: Bill Frenzel)
  - on the Budget Process, Reconciliation and Enforcement (Chair: Marty Russo; Ranking Member: Jack Buechner)
  - Community Development and Natural Resources (Chair: Ed Jenkins; Ranking Member: Hal Rogers)
  - Defense, Foreign Policy and Space (Chair: Marvin Leath; Ranking Member: Denny Smith)
  - Urgent Fiscal Issues (Chair: Chuck Schumer; Ranking Member: Dick Armey)
  - Human Resources (Chair: Barbara Boxer; Ranking Member: William F. Goodling)
  - Economic Policy, Projections and Revenues (Chair: Jim Slattery; Ranking Member: Bill Thomas)
- Children, Youth and Families (Select) (Chair: George Miller; Ranking Member: Thomas J. Bliley Jr.)
- District of Columbia (Chair: Ron Dellums; Ranking Member: Stanford Parris)
  - Fiscal Affairs and Health (Chair: Walter E. Fauntroy; Ranking Member: Thomas J. Bliley Jr.)
  - Government Operations and Metropolitan Affairs (Chair: Alan Wheat; Ranking Member: Larry Combest)
  - Judiciary and Education (Chair: Mervyn M. Dymally; Ranking Member: Dana Rohrabacher)
- Education and Labor (Chair: Augustus F. Hawkins; Ranking Member: William F. Goodling)
  - Elementary, Secondary and Vocational Education (Chair: Augustus F. Hawkins; Ranking Member: William F. Goodling)
  - Employment Opportunities (Chair: Matthew G. Martinez; Ranking Member: Steve Gunderson)
  - Health and Safety (Chair: Joseph M. Gaydos; Ranking Member: Paul B. Henry)
  - Human Resources (Chair: Dale Kildee; Ranking Member: Thomas J. Tauke)
  - Labor-Management Relations (Chair: Bill Clay; Ranking Member: Marge Roukema)
  - Labor Standards (Chair: Austin J. Murphy; Ranking Member: Tom Petri)
  - Postsecondary Education (Chair: Pat Williams; Ranking Member: E. Thomas Coleman)
  - Select Education (Chair: Major R. Owens; Ranking Member: Steve Bartlett)
- Energy and Commerce (Chair: John Dingell; Ranking Member: Norman F. Lent)
  - Commerce, Transportation and Competitiveness (Chair: James J. Florio; Ranking Member: Don Ritter)
  - Energy and Power (Chair: Phil Sharp; Ranking Member: Carlos J. Moorhead)
  - Health and the Environment (Chair: Henry Waxman; Ranking Member: Edward Madigan)
  - Oversight and Investigations (Chair: John Dingell; Ranking Member: Thomas J. Bliley Jr.)
  - Telecommunications and Finance (Chair: Ed Markey; Ranking Member: Matthew J. Rinaldo)
  - Transportation and Hazardous Materials (Chair: Tom Luken; Ranking Member: Bob Whittaker)
- Foreign Affairs (Chair: Dante Fascell; Ranking Member: William S. Broomfield)
  - Africa (Chair: Howard Wolpe; Ranking Member: Dan Burton)
  - Arms Control, International Security and Science (Chair: Dante Fascell; Ranking Member: William S. Broomfield)
  - Asian and Pacific Affairs (Chair: Stephen Solarz; Ranking Member: Jim Leach)
  - Europe and the Middle East (Chair: Lee H. Hamilton; Ranking Member: Benjamin A. Gilman)
  - Human Rights and International Organizations (Chair: Gus Yatron; Ranking Member: Doug Bereuter)
  - International Economic Policy and Trade (Chair: Sam Gejdenson; Ranking Member: Toby Roth)
  - International Operations (Chair: Mervyn M. Dymally; Ranking Member: Olympia Snowe)
  - Western Hemisphere Affairs (Chair: George W. Crockett; Ranking Member: Robert J. Lagomarsino)
- Government Operations (Chair: John Conyers; Ranking Member: Frank Horton)
  - Commerce, Consumer and Monetary Affairs (Chair: Doug Barnard; Ranking Member: Dennis Hastert)
  - Employment and Housing (Chair: Tom Lantos; Ranking Member: Buz Lukens)
  - Environment, Energy and Natural Resources (Chair: Mike Synar; Ranking Member: William F. Clinger Jr.)
  - Government Activities and Transportation (Chair: Cardiss Collins; Ranking Member: Howard C. Nielson)
  - Government Information, Justice and Agriculture (Chair: Bob Wise; Ranking Member: Al McCandless)
  - Human Resources and Ingovernmental Relations (Chair: Ted Weiss; Ranking Member: Larkin I. Smith)
  - Legislation and National Security (Chair: John Conyers; Ranking Member: Frank Horton)
- House Administration (Chair: Frank Annunzio; Ranking Member: Bill Thomas)
  - Accounts (Chair: Joseph M. Gaydos; Ranking Member: Barbara F. Vucanovich)
  - Elections (Chair: Al Swift; Ranking Member: Bill Thomas)
  - Libraries and Memorials (Chair: Bill Clay; Ranking Member: Paul E. Gillmor)
  - Office Systems (Chair: Charlie Rose; Ranking Member: James T. Walsh)
  - Personnel and Police (Chair: Mary Rose Oakar; Ranking Member: Pat Roberts)
  - Procurement and Printing (Chair: Jim Bates; Ranking Member: Pat Roberts)
  - Task Force on Legislative Service Organizations (Chair: Sam Gejdenson; Ranking Member: Barbara F. Vucanovich)
- Hunger (Select) (Chair: Mickey Leland; Ranking Member: Bill Emerson)
- Interior and Insular Affairs (Chair: Mo Udall; Ranking Member: Don Young)
  - Energy and the Environment (Chair: Mo Udall; Ranking Member: James V. Hansen)
  - General Oversight, Northwest Power and Forest Management (Chair: Peter H. Kostmayer; Ranking Member: Barbara F. Vucanovich)
  - Insular and International Affairs (Chair: Ron de Lugo; Ranking Member: Robert J. Lagomarsino)
  - Mining and Natural Resources (Chair: Nick Rahall; Ranking Member: Larry E. Craig)
  - National Parks and Public Lands (Chair: Bruce Vento; Ranking Member: Ron Marlenee)
  - Water and Power Resources and Offshore Energy Resources (Chair: George Miller; Ranking Member: Denny Smith)
- Judiciary (Chair: Jack Brooks; Ranking Member: Hamilton Fish IV)
  - Administrative Law and Governmental Relations (Chair: Barney Frank; Ranking Member: Craig James)
  - Civil and Constitutional Rights (Chair: Don Edwards; Ranking Member: F. James Sensenbrenner)
  - Crime (Chair: William J. Hughes; Ranking Member: Bill McCollum)
  - Courts, Intellectual Property and the Administration of Justice (Chair: Robert W. Kastenmeier; Ranking Member: Carlos J. Moorhead)
  - Criminal Justice (Chair: Chuck Schumer; Ranking Member: George W. Gekas)
  - Economic and Commercial Law (Chair: Jack Brooks; Ranking Member: Hamilton Fish IV)
  - Immigration, Refugees and International Law (Chair: Bruce Morrison; Ranking Member: Lamar Smith)
- Merchant Marine and Fisheries (Chair: Walter B. Jones Sr.; Ranking Member: Robert W. Davis)
  - Coast Guard and Navigation (Chair: Billy Tauzin; Ranking Member: Robert W. Davis)
  - Fisheries, Wildlife Conservation and the Environment (Chair: Gerry Studds; Ranking Member: Don Young)
  - Merchant Marine (Chair: Walter B. Jones Sr.; Ranking Member: Norman F. Lent)
  - Oceanography (Chair: Dennis M. Hertel; Ranking Member: Norman D. Shumway)
  - Oversight and Investigations (Chair: Thomas M. Foglietta; Ranking Member: Claudine Schneider)
  - Panama Canal and Outer Continental Stuff (Chair: Roy Dyson; Ranking Member: Jack Fields)
- Narcotics Abuse and Control (Select) (Chair: Charles Rangel; Ranking Member: Lawrence Coughlin)
- Post Office and Civil Service (Chair: William D. Ford; Ranking Member: Benjamin A. Gilman)
  - Census and Population (Chair: Thomas C. Sawyer; Ranking Member: Tom Ridge)
  - Civil Service (Chair: Gerry Sikorski; Ranking Member: John T. Myers)
  - Compensation and Employee Benefits (Chair: Gary L. Ackerman; Ranking Member: John T. Myers)
  - Human Resources (Chair: Paul E. Kanjorski; Ranking Member: Dan Burton)
  - Investigations (Chair: William D. Ford; Ranking Member: Rod Chandler)
  - Postal Operations and Services (Chair: Mickey Leland; Ranking Member: Frank Horton)
  - Postal Personnel and Modernization (Chair: Frank McCloskey; Ranking Member: Don Young)
- Public Works and Transportation (Chair: Glenn M. Anderson; Ranking Member: John Paul Hammerschmidt)
  - Aviation (Chair: Jim Oberstar; Ranking Member: Bud Shuster)
  - Economic Development (Chair: Gus Savage; Ranking Member: Bob McEwen)
  - Investigations and Oversight (Chair: Glenn M. Anderson; Ranking Member: William F. Clinger Jr.)
  - Public Buildings and Grounds (Chair: Douglas H. Bosco; Ranking Member: Tom Petri)
  - Surface Transportation (Chair: Norman Mineta; Ranking Member: Bud Shuster)
  - Water Resources (Chair: Henry Nowak; Ranking Member: Arlan Stangeland)
- Rules (Chair: Joe Moakley; Ranking Member: Jimmy Quillen)
  - Rules of the House (Chair: Joe Moakley; Ranking Member: Gerald B.H. Solomon)
  - The Legislative Process (Chair: Butler Derrick; Ranking Member: Lynn Morley Martin)
- Science and Technology (Chair: Robert A. Roe; Ranking Member: Robert S. Walker)
  - Energy Research and Development (Chair: Marilyn Lloyd; Ranking Member: Sid Morrison)
  - Investigations and Oversight (Chair: Robert A. Roe; Ranking Member: Don Ritter)
  - International Scientific Cooperation (Chair: Ralph M. Hall; Ranking Member: Ron Packard)
  - Natural Resources, Agriculture Research and Environment (Chair: James H. Scheuer; Ranking Member: Claudine Schneider)
  - Science, Research and Technology (Chair: Doug Walgren; Ranking Member: Sherwood L. Boehlert)
  - Space Science and Applications (Chair: Bill Nelson; Ranking Member: Jim Sensenbrenner)
  - Transportation, Aviation and Materials (Chair: Tim Valentine; Ranking Member: Tom Lewis)
- Small Business (Chair: John J. LaFalce; Ranking Member: Joseph M. McDade)
  - Antitrust, Impact of Deregulation and Privatization (Chair: Tom Luken; Ranking Member: David Dreier)
  - Environment and Labor (Chair: Esteban E. Torres; Ranking Member: John P. Hiler)
  - Exports, Tax Policy and Special Problems (Chair: Norman Sisisky; Ranking Member: Andy Ireland)
  - Procurement, Tourism and Minority Enterprise Development (Chair: Ike Skelton; Ranking Member: Silvio O. Conte)
  - Regulation, Business Opportunity and Energy (Chair: Ron Wyden; Ranking Member: William S. Broomfield)
  - SBA, the General Economy and Minority Enterprise Development (Chair: John J. LaFalce; Ranking Member: Joseph M. McDade)
- Standards of Official Conduct (Chair: Julian C. Dixon; Ranking Member: John T. Myers)
- Veterans' Affairs (Chair: Gillespie V. Montgomery; Ranking Member: Bob Stump)
  - Hospitals and Health Care (Chair: Sonny Montgomery; Ranking Member: John Paul Hammerschmidt)
  - Compensation, Pension and Insurance (Chair: Douglas Applegate; Ranking Member: Bob McEwen)
  - Oversight and Investigations (Chair: Lane Evans; Ranking Member: Bob Stump)
  - Education, Training and Employment (Chair: Tim Penny; Ranking Member: Chris Smith)
  - Housing and Memorial Affairs (Chair: Harley O. Staggers; Ranking Member: Dan Burton)
- Ways and Means (Chair: Dan Rostenkowski; Ranking Member: Bill Archer)
  - Health (Chair: Pete Stark; Ranking Member: Willis D. Gradison Jr.)
  - Human Resources (Chair: Harold Ford Sr.; Ranking Member: E. Clay Shaw Jr.)
  - Oversight (Chair: J.J. Pickle; Ranking Member: Richard T. Schulze)
  - Select Revenue Measures (Chair: Charles Rangel; Ranking Member: Guy Vander Jagt)
  - Social Security (Chair: Andrew Jacobs Jr.; Ranking Member: Hank Brown)
  - Trade (Chair: Sam Gibbons; Ranking Member: Phil Crane)
- Whole

=== Joint committees ===
- Economic (Chair: Sen. Paul Sarbanes; Ranking Member: Rep. Lee H. Hamilton)
- Taxation (Chair: Rep. Dan Rostenkowski; Vice Chair: Sen. Lloyd Bentsen)
- The Library (Chair: Rep. Frank Annunzio; Vice Chair: Sen. Claiborne Pell)
- Printing (Chair: Sen. Wendell H. Ford; Vice Chair: Rep. Frank Annunzio)

== Employees ==
=== Legislative branch agency directors ===
- Architect of the Capitol: George Malcolm White
- Attending Physician of the United States Congress: William Narva, until 1990
  - Robert Krasner, from 1990
- Comptroller General of the United States: Charles A. Bowsher
- Director of the Congressional Budget Office: James L. Blum Jr. (acting), until March 6, 1989
  - Robert D. Reischauer, from March 6, 1989
- Librarian of Congress: James H. Billington
- Public Printer of the United States: vacant, until 1990
  - Robert Houk, from 1990

=== Senate ===
- Chaplain: Richard C. Halverson (Presbyterian)
- Historian: Richard A. Baker
- Parliamentarian: Alan Frumin
- Curator: James R. Ketchum
- Secretary: Walter J. Stewart
- Librarian: Roger K. Haley
- Secretary for the Majority: C. Abbott Saffold
- Secretary for the Minority: Howard O. Greene Jr.
- Sergeant at Arms: Henry K. Giugni, until December 31, 1990; vacant thereafter

=== House of Representatives ===
- Chaplain: James D. Ford (Lutheran)
- Clerk: Donnald K. Anderson
- Doorkeeper: James T. Molloy
- Historian: Ray Smock
- Reading Clerks: Meg Goetz (Democratic) and Paul Hays (Republican)
- Parliamentarian: William H. Brown
- Postmaster: Robert V. Rota
- Sergeant at Arms: Jack Russ

== See also ==
- List of new members of the 101st United States Congress
- 1988 United States elections (elections leading to this Congress)
  - 1988 United States presidential election
  - 1988 United States Senate elections
  - 1988 United States House of Representatives elections
- 1990 United States elections (elections during this Congress, leading to the next Congress)
  - 1990 United States Senate elections
  - 1990 United States House of Representatives elections
