= 1989 United States House of Representatives elections =

1989 U.S. House of Representatives elections
- March 28th - December 9, 1989

8 (out of 435) seats in the U.S. House of Representatives 218 seats needed for a majority
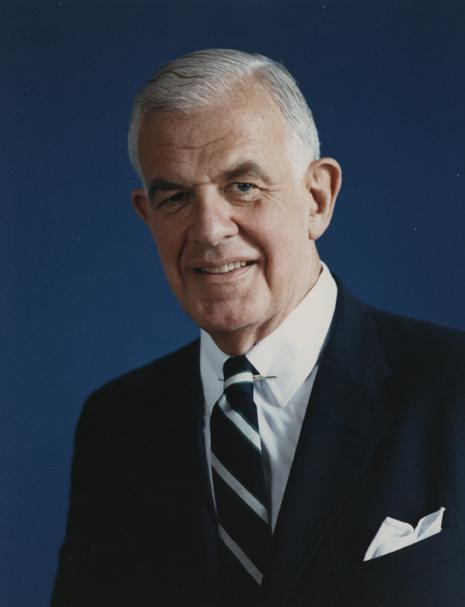

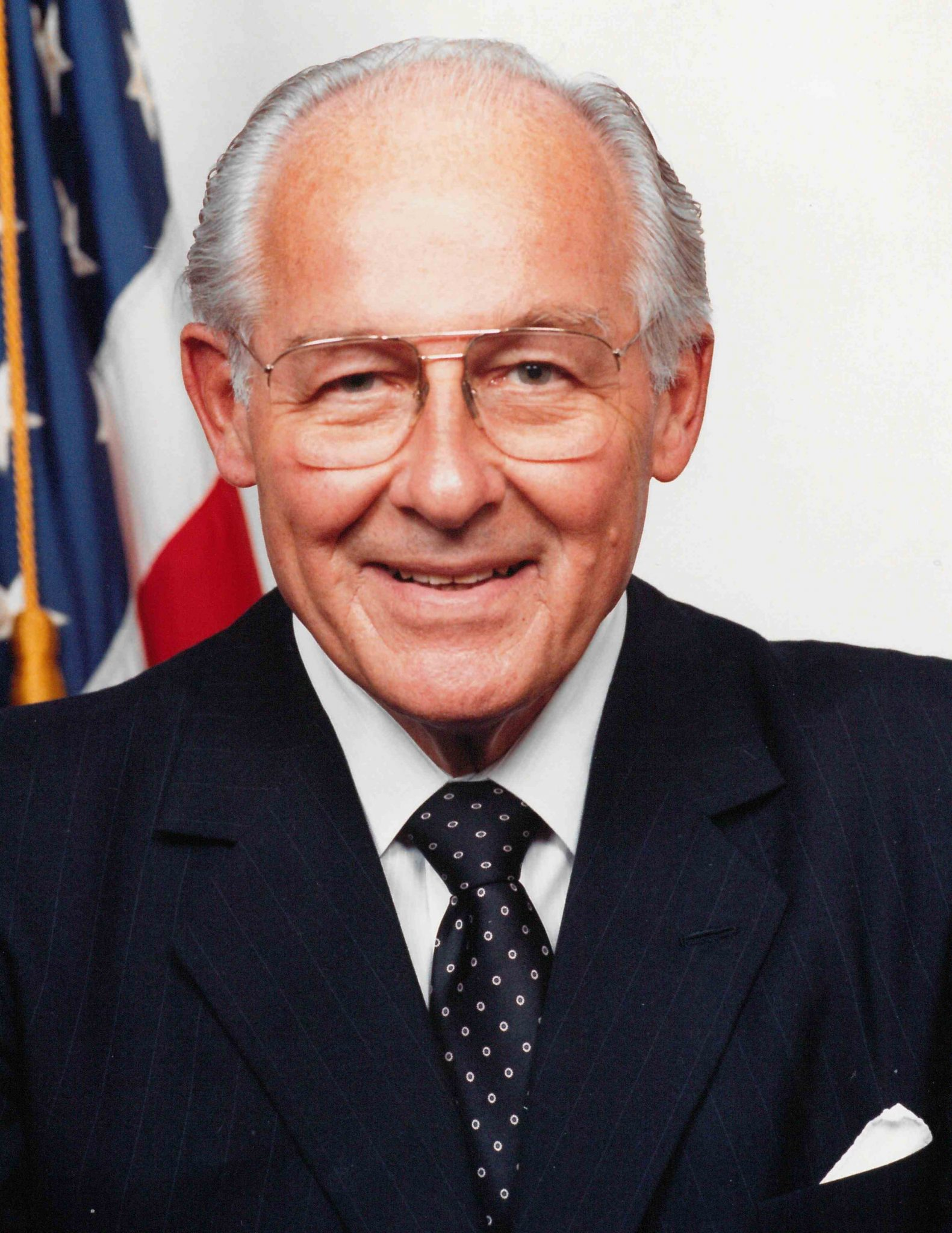
	Majority party	Minority party
Leader	Tom Foley	Bob Michel
Party	Democratic	Republican
Leader since	June 6, 1989	January 3, 1981
Leader's seat	Washington 5th	Illinois 18th
Last election	260 seats	175 seats
Seats won	261	174
Seat change	▲1	▼1

In 1989 there were eight special elections to the United States House of Representatives.

== List of elections ==
Elections are listed by date and district.

District	Incumbent			This race	
District	Member	Party	First elected	Results	Candidates
Alabama 3	Bill Nichols	Democratic	1966	Incumbent won reelection, but died December 13, 1988, at the end of the previous Congress. New member elected April 4, 1989. Democratic hold.	▌ ✓ Glen Browder (Democratic) 65.29%; ▌John Rice (Republican) 34.71%
Indiana 4	Dan Coats	Republican	1980	Incumbent resigned January 3, 1989, to become U.S. Senator. New member elected March 28, 1989. Democratic gain.	▌ ✓ Jill Long (Democratic) 50.69%; ▌Dan Heath (Republican) 49.31%
Wyoming at-large	Dick Cheney	Republican	1978	Incumbent resigned March 17, 1989, to become U.S. Secretary of Defense. New member elected April 26, 1989. Republican hold.	▌ ✓ Craig L. Thomas (Republican) 52.55%; ▌John Vinich (Democratic) 42.98%
Florida 18	Claude Pepper	Democratic	1962	Incumbent died May 30, 1989. New member elected August 29, 1989. Republican gain.	▌ ✓ Ileana Ros-Lehtinen (Republican) 53.14%; ▌Gerald Richman (Democratic) 46.85%
California 15	Tony Coelho	Democratic	1978	Incumbent resigned June 15, 1989. New member elected September 12, 1989. Democratic hold.	▌ ✓ Gary Condit (Democratic) 57.15%; ▌Clare L. Berryhill (Republican) 35.03%; ▌Robert J. Weimer (Republican) 3.26%; ▌Cliff Burris (Republican) 2.64%
Texas 12	Jim Wright	Democratic	1954	Incumbent resigned June 30, 1989. New member elected September 12, 1989. Democratic hold.	▌ ✓ Pete Geren (Democratic) 51.03%; ▌Bob Lanier (Democratic) 48.97%
Texas 18	Mickey Leland	Democratic	1978	Incumbent died August 7, 1989. New member elected December 9, 1989. Democratic hold.	▌ ✓ Craig Washington (Democratic) 56.8%; ▌Anthony Hall (Democratic) 43.2%
Mississippi 5	Larkin I. Smith	Republican	1988	Incumbent died August 13, 1989. New member elected October 17, 1989. Democratic gain.	▌ ✓ Gene Taylor (Democratic) 65%; ▌Tom Anderson (Republican) 35%

== See also ==
- List of special elections to the United States House of Representatives
- 101st United States Congress
