= Leland Initiative =

USAID program to improve internet connectivity in Africa

- Type of project: International Development Program
- Location: Africa
- Founder: United States Government
- Country: United States
- Launched: March, 1996
- Budget: $15 million
- Status: Unknown

The Leland Initiative was a five-year $15 million program of the United States Agency for International Development to improve internet connectivity in Africa. It was named after Mickey Leland. Its implementation phase started in March 1996. The Leland Initiative worked to support policy reforms to reduce barriers to open connectivity, providing affordable prices, based upon costs plus profit, conducive to broad expansion of the user base; delivery of Internet services by private sector providers; and free and open access to information available through the Internet, in conformance with host country laws.

It was criticised for forcing connectivity through incumbent telecoms, which hampered countries' nascent efforts for Internet connectivity.
