= Craig Washington =

American politician

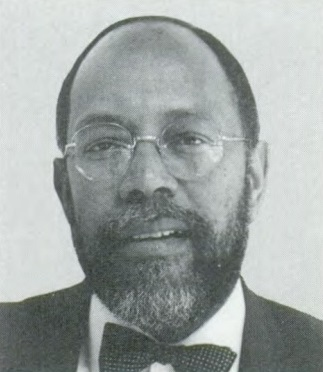

Member of the U.S. House of Representatives from Texas's 18th district
- In office December 9, 1989 – January 3, 1995 (Note: Washington's official service begins on the date of the special election, while he was not sworn in until January 23, 1990.)
- Preceded by: Mickey Leland
- Succeeded by: Sheila Jackson Lee

Member of the Texas Senate from the 13th district
- In office January 11, 1983 – January 23, 1990
- Preceded by: Walter Mengden
- Succeeded by: Rodney Ellis

Member of the Texas House of Representatives from the 86th district
- In office January 9, 1973 – January 11, 1983
- Preceded by: Charles Finnell
- Succeeded by: Larry Evans

Personal details
- Born: Craig Anthony Washington; October 12, 1941 (age 84) Longview, Texas, U.S.
- Party: Democratic
- Children: 5
- Education: Prairie View A&M University (BS); Texas Southern University (JD)

Craig Anthony Washington (born October 12, 1941) is an American lawyer and Democratic Party politician from Texas who served in the Texas State Senate and the United States House of Representatives.

The son of Roy and Azalia Washington, Washington graduated from Prairie View A&M University in 1966 and was originally interested in becoming a doctor, but as admissions to medical school had already ceased, Washington decided to instead apply at Texas Southern University's law school.

== Career ==
In 1972, the state of Texas began electing members of the state House of Representatives and State Senate, for the first time, by single-member districts. Washington, along with four other minority candidates, Anthony Hall, George T. "Mickey" Leland, Benny Reyes and Cecil Bush, (dubbed the "People's Five"), ran for seats in the Texas House of Representatives. Washington was elected, and represented District 86 in the state House from 1973 to 1982. He then represented District 13 in the state senate from 1983 until 1989.

Washington was elected as a Democrat to the 101st United States Congress for Texas's 18th congressional district, by special election, December 9, 1989, to fill the vacancy caused by the death of Mickey Leland. He was reelected to the 102nd United States Congress and 103rd United States Congress and served from December 9, 1989, to January 3, 1995. He took stands against some projects, like the International Space Station, where spending would have flowed to his district.

In March 1994, Washington was routed in the Democratic primary by Houston City Councilwoman Sheila Jackson Lee, winning only 36.5 percent of the vote. Lee won in November and held the seat until her death on July 19, 2024.

Since leaving Congress, Washington has practiced law in Houston and Bastrop, Texas.

== See also ==
- List of African-American United States representatives

U.S. House of Representatives
Preceded by Mickey Leland	Member of the U.S. House of Representatives from Texas's 18th congressional district 1989–1995	Succeeded by Sheila Jackson Lee
U.S. order of precedence (ceremonial)
Preceded by Bill Sarpalius as Former U.S. Representative	Order of precedence of the United States as Former U.S. Representative	Succeeded by Beto O'Rourke as Former U.S. Representative
