= Crime and Justice Research Alliance =

Crime & Justice Research Alliance
- Abbreviation: CJRA
- Formation: 2014
- Location: Washington, D.C.
- Services: Informing policymakers about criminal justice issues
- Members: >5,000 (2017)
- Chair: Peter Wood
- Vice Chair: Richard Rosenfeld
- Website: crimeandjusticeresearchalliance.org

The Crime and Justice Research Alliance (abbreviated CJRA) is a Washington, D.C.–based partnership between the Academy of Criminal Justice Sciences and the American Society of Criminology. It was established in 2014, and aims to provide nonpartisan summaries of criminal justice research to policymakers. It represents over 5,000 criminal justice experts.
