= Mickey Leland =

American politician and activist (1944–1989)

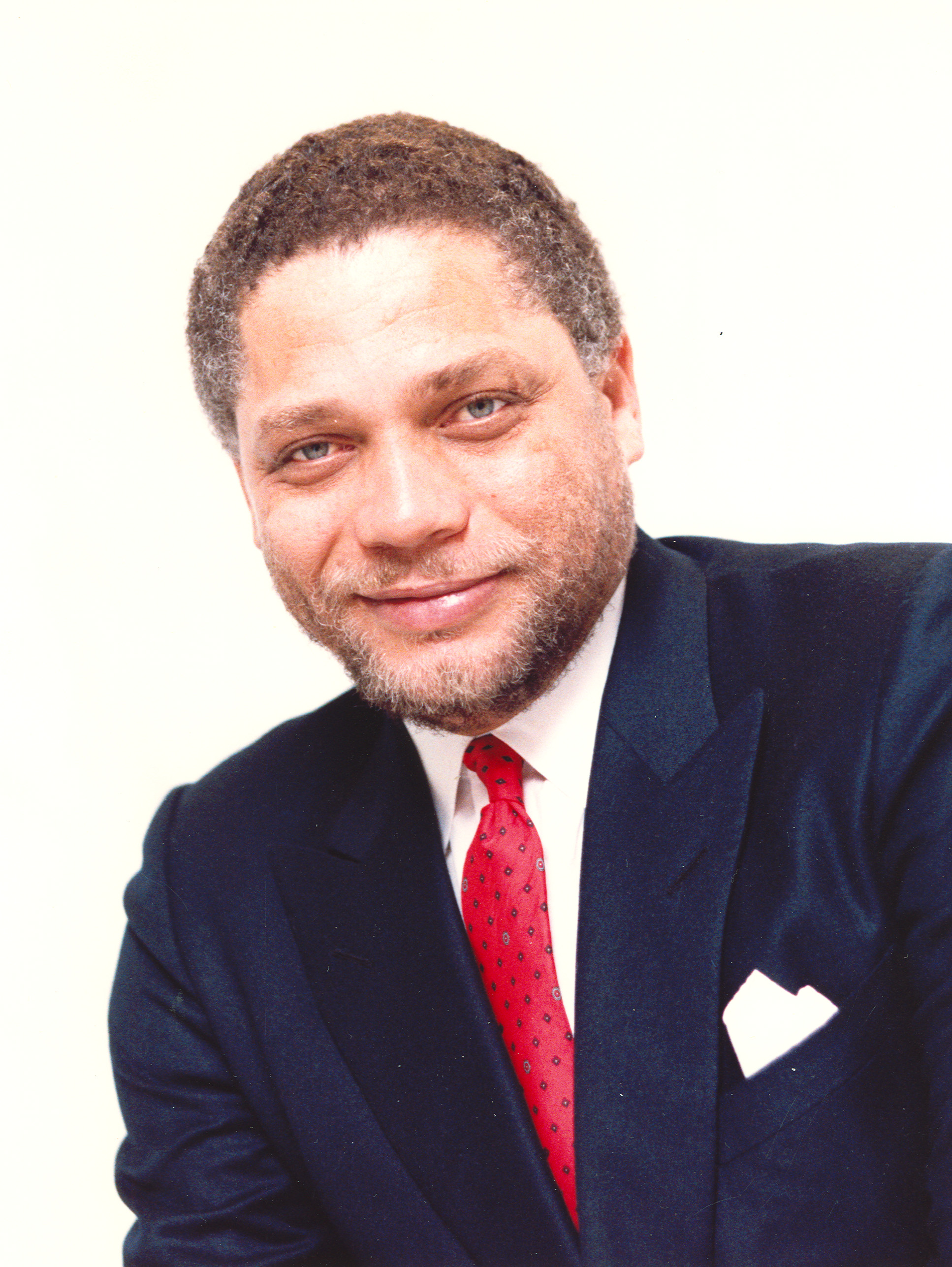

Member of the U.S. House of Representatives from Texas's 18th district
- In office January 3, 1979 – August 7, 1989
- Preceded by: Barbara Jordan
- Succeeded by: Craig Washington

Member of the Texas House of Representatives from the 88th district
- In office January 9, 1973 – January 3, 1979
- Preceded by: Unknown
- Succeeded by: El Franco Lee

Personal details
- Born: George Thomas Leland III; November 27, 1944 Lubbock, Texas, U.S.
- Died: August 7, 1989 (aged 44) Gambela, Ethiopia
- Party: Democratic
- Spouse: Alison Clark Walton (m. 1983)
- Children: 3
- Education: Texas Southern University (BS)

George Thomas "Mickey" Leland III (November 27, 1944 – August 7, 1989) was an American politician and anti-poverty activist. He served as a congressman from the Texas 18th District and chair of the Congressional Black Caucus. He was a Democrat.

== Early years ==
Leland was born in Lubbock, Texas to Alice and George Thomas Leland, II. At a very early age, the Lelands moved to Houston's Fifth Ward neighborhood.

Growing up in a predominantly African-American neighborhood, Leland attended Wheatley High School in Houston, Texas, where he ranked in the top ten percent of his class when he graduated from Wheatley in 1964. While attending Texas Southern University in the late 1960s, he emerged as a vocal leader of the Houston-area civil rights movement and had brought national leaders of the movement to Houston. Leland graduated from Texas Southern in 1970 with a bachelor's degree in Pharmacy. He served as an instructor of Clinical Pharmacy at his alma mater in 1970–71, where he set up "door-to-door" outreach campaigns in low-income neighborhoods to inform people about their medical care options and performing preliminary screenings.

It was during the administration of then-Texas Southern University President Leonard O. Spearman, where Leland received an honorary doctorate degree from his alma mater.

== Texas House of Representatives ==
In 1972, Texas for the first time allowed its State House of Representatives and Senate seats to be elected as single-member districts. Soon after the decision, five minority candidates (dubbed the "People's Five"), including eventual winners Leland, Craig Washington and Benny Reyes ran for district seats in the Texas House of Representatives, a first for a state that had not seen any African-American state representatives since Reconstruction although Barbara Jordan had been a state senator.

Re-elected in 1974 and again in 1976, Leland served three two-year terms in the Texas House of Representatives, representing the 88th District and while in Austin, he became famous for being a staunch advocate of healthcare rights for poor Texans. He was responsible for the passage of legislation that provided low-income consumers with access to affordable generic drugs, and supported the creation of healthcare access through Health Maintenance Organizations (HMOs). In order to accomplish his goals in Austin, Leland served on the Texas State Labor Committee, the State Affairs Committee, the Human Resources Committee, the Legislative Council, and the Subcommittee on Occupational and Industrial Safety. He was elected the vice-chairman of the Joint Committee on Prison Reform including becoming the first African-American to serve on the Senate–House Conference Committee as a member of the House Appropriations Committee.

== U.S. House of Representatives ==
After six years in the Texas State Legislature, Leland was elected to the United States House of Representatives in November 1978 to represent Texas's 18th District and was re-elected easily in 1980, 1982, 1984, 1986 and again in 1988 to six two-year terms, serving until his death. The congressional district included the neighborhood in which he had grown up, and he was recognized as a knowledgeable advocate for health, children and the elderly. His leadership abilities were immediately noticed in Washington, and he was named to serve as Freshman Majority Whip in his first term, and later served twice as At-Large Majority Whip. Leland was re-elected to each succeeding Congress until his death.

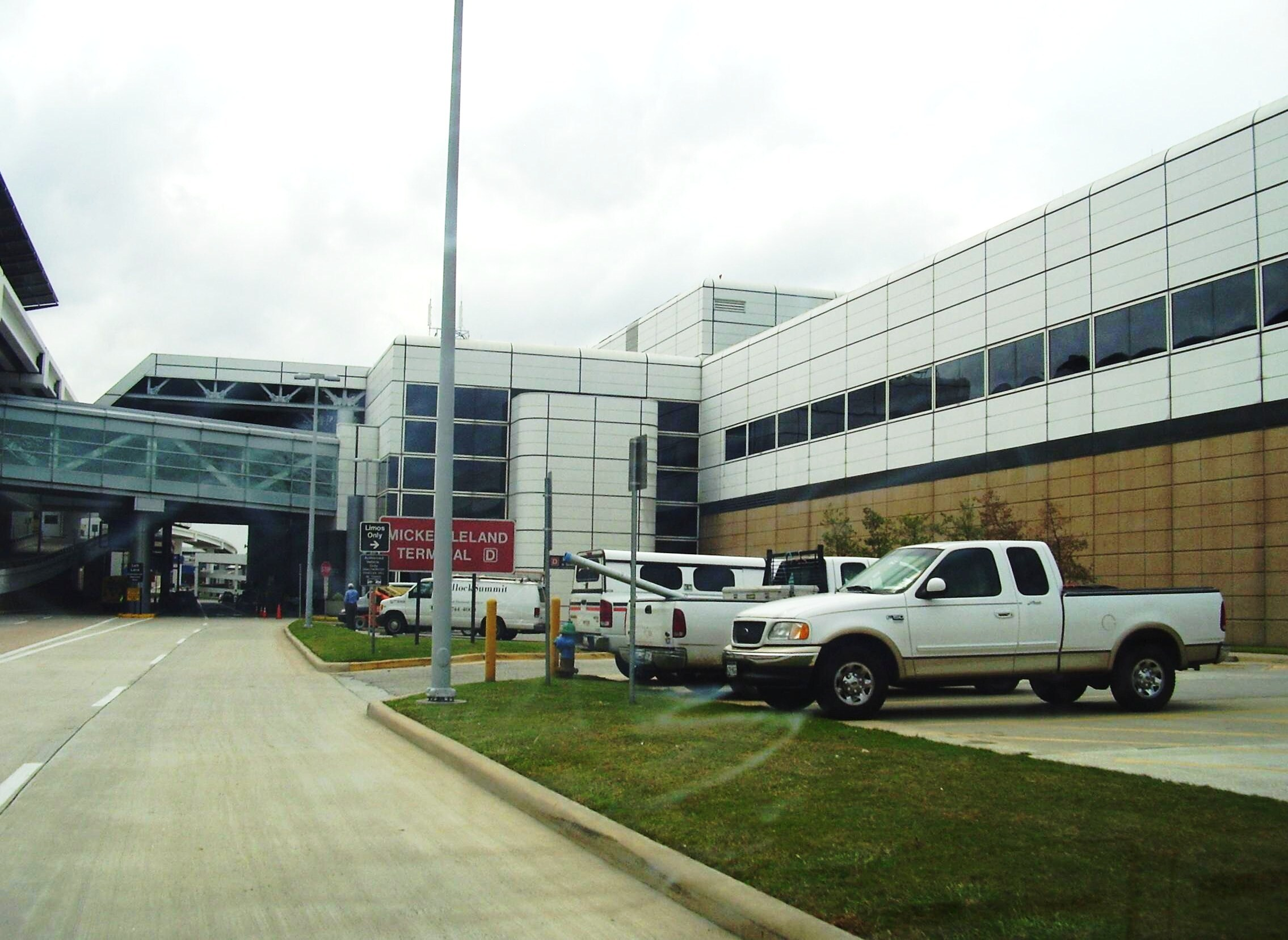
Mickey Leland International Terminal D at Houston's George Bush Intercontinental Airport is named after Leland.

Leland was an effective advocate on hunger and public health issues. In 1984, Leland established the Congressional Select Committee on Hunger and initiated a number of programs designed to assuage the famine crises that plagued Ethiopia and Sudan through much of the 1980s. Leland pioneered many afro-centric cultural norms in Washington which included wearing a dashiki and African-style hats.

As he visited soup kitchens and makeshift shelters, he became increasingly concerned about the hungry and homeless. The work for which he is best remembered began when Leland co-authored legislation with U.S. Rep. Ben Gilman (R-New York State) in establishing the House Select Committee on Hunger. U.S. Speaker of the House Tip O'Neill (D-Massachusetts) named Leland chairman when it was enacted in 1984. The Select Committee's mandate was to "conduct a continuing, comprehensive study and review of the problems of hunger and malnutrition."

Although the committee had no legislative jurisdiction, the committee for the first time provided a single focus for hunger-related issues. The committee's impact and influence would stem largely from Leland's ability to generate awareness of complex hunger alleviation issues and exert his personal moral leadership. In addition to focusing attention on issues of hunger, his legislative initiatives would create the National Commission on Infant Mortality, better access for fresh food for at-risk women, children and infants, and the first comprehensive services for the homeless.

Leland's sensitivity to the immediate needs of poor and hungry people would soon make him a spokesperson for hungry people on a far broader scale. Reports of acute famine in sub-Saharan Africa immediately prompted Speaker O'Neill to ask Leland to lead a bipartisan Congressional delegation to assess conditions and relief requirements. When Leland returned, he brought together entertainment personalities, religious leaders and private voluntary agencies to create general public support for the Africa Famine Relief and Recovery Act of 1985. That legislation provided $800 million in food and humanitarian relief supplies. The international attention Leland had focused on the famine brought additional support for non-governmental efforts, saving thousands of lives.

His ability in reaching out to others with innovative ideas and to gain support from unlikely sources was a key to his success in effectively addressing the problems for the poor and minorities. He met with both Pope John Paul II about food aid to Africa and Cuban President Fidel Castro about reuniting Cuban families. In Moscow, as part of the first Congressional delegation led by a Speaker of the House as part of the post-Cold War Era, he proposed a joint US-Soviet food initiative to Mozambique. As Chairman of the Congressional Black Caucus, Leland proudly presented the first awards the caucus had ever given to non-black recipients: rock musician Bob Geldof and news anchor Ted Koppel. Geldof was honored for his Band Aid concert and fund-raising efforts for African famine victims, while Koppel was honored for his news stories on the African famine.

Leland was a powerful advocate on other major issues as well. While chairing the House Select Committee on Hunger, Leland was a member of the Committee on Energy and Commerce, and the Subcommittees on Telecommunications and Finance, Health and the Environment, and Energy and Power. He chaired the Subcommittee on Postal Operations and Services and served on the Committee on Post Office and Civil Service and the Subcommittee on Compensation and Employment.

== Death ==
On August 7, 1989, Leland died in a plane crash in Gambela, Ethiopia, during a mission to Fugnido, Ethiopia. A total of 16 people died in the crash, also including the acclaimed writer Maria Thomas. Leland's friend and former fellow Texas legislator, Craig Washington, was elected to his unexpired congressional term in December 1989.

== Personal life ==
In 1983, Leland married Alison Clarke Walton (b. 1959), who he had met a year earlier at a reception on Capitol Hill while she was attending her first semester at Georgetown Law School. After being convinced by her friends to approach Leland for an internship, the two held their first date at a dinner at Al Gore's home. They had three sons, Jarrett David (b. February 6, 1986) and twins, Austin Mickey and Cameron George (b. January 14, 1990 after Leland's death).

Leland was Catholic.

== Legacy ==
Since Leland's death, a number of buildings and initiatives have been renamed in his honor:

- A federal building in Downtown Houston (which currently served as the congressional headquarters for one of his successors, Congresswoman Sheila Jackson Lee)
- The International Terminal (Terminal D) at George Bush Intercontinental Airport in Houston
- A street in Addis Ababa
- A condominium village in Addis Ababa
- The USAID Leland Initiative to improve internet connectivity in Africa
- The Texas Commission on Environmental Quality's Mickey Leland Environmental Internship Program
- The Department of Energy's Minority Education Initiative was renamed the Mickey Leland Energy Fellowship
- A large number of other government programs, fellowships, and academic organizations have also been named in his memory.
- Singer-songwriter Pierce Pettis included a song about Leland on his 1991 album Tinseltown.
- The Mickey Leland College Preparatory Academy for Young Men in Houston
- The Barbara Jordan-Mickey Leland School of Public Affairs at Texas Southern University.
- So Others Might Eat's Leland Place is a 90-day transitional housing program for 23 homeless men in recovery, located in Washington, DC.
- Mickey Leland Primary School in Addis Ababa, Ethiopia.

There is a statue on Leland in Hermann Park, Houston, near the Miller Outdoor Theatre.

== See also ==
- History of African Americans in Houston
- List of members of the United States Congress who died in office (1950–1999)
- List of African-American United States representatives

== Videos ==
(1) Arrival Ceremony for Leland on August 23, 1989

(2) Memorial Service for Congressman Leland on August 14, 1989

(3) Reaction on the Leland plane crash from August 13, 1989

(4) Update on Leland fatal plane crash from August 13, 1989

(5) Call-in session on the resignation of House Speaker Jim Wright from May 31, 1989

(6) Congressional Black Caucus from May 23, 1989

(7) Black Jewish Relations from April 11, 1989

(8) Judaism Foreign Policy from April 11, 1989

(9) Nominating Speeches at the Democratic National Convention in Atlanta, Georgia from July 21, 1988

(10) Hiring & Promotion Cable TV & Broadcast Industry from May 17, 1988

(11) Program Trading Stock Market Volatility from April 21, 1988

(12) Telephone Rate Regulation from November 10, 1987

(13) World Hunger from October 14, 1987

(14) Iran-Contra Investigation Day 1 from May 5, 1987

(15) South African Sanction Veto Override from September 29, 1986

(16) 1986 Election Briefing from August 14, 1986

(17) Scrambling Satellite Television from June 12, 1986

(18) Jim Wright Roast on May 13, 1986

(19) Mickey Leland Interview from December 16, 1985

(20) Employment Issues from July 10, 1985

(21) William Reynolds Nomination from June 5, 1985

(22) Black Hispanic Breakfast from July 18, 1984

(23) Minority Caucus from July 18, 1984

(24) Broadcast Reform from October 6, 1983

(25) Broadcast Reform from September 23, 1983

(26) Minorities in the Media from September 19, 1983

(27) GM Car Brake Defects from August 5, 1983

U.S. House of Representatives
Preceded by Barbara Jordan	Member of the U.S. House of Representatives from Texas's 18th congressional district 1979–1989	Succeeded by Craig Washington
New office	Chair of the House Hunger Committee; 1983–1991	Succeeded by Tony P. Hall
Preceded by Julian C. Dixon	Chair of the Congressional Black Caucus; 1985–1987	Succeeded by Mervyn M. Dymally
