= Civil Justice Reform Act =

The Civil Justice Reform Act ("CJRA", as Title I of the Judicial Improvements Act of 1990, Pub. L. 101–650, 28 476, 104 Stat. 5089, enacted December 1, 1990) is a U.S. federal law enacted in 1990. It was the last major expansion of the Federal US Judiciary. Federal Judges in the United States have lifetime tenure and, although each district judge is marginally supervised by a chief judge, there was little national oversight of each judge's case management practices. Congress enacted CJRA in response to complaints of significant delays in the resolution of civil litigation in the federal courts; the CJRA was designed to encourage the speedy resolution of civil matters (both cases and motions) by requiring the Director of the Administrative Office of the United States Courts to prepare and publish a semi-annual report showing, by U.S. district judge and magistrate judge, all motions pending more than six months, all bench trials submitted more than six months, all bankruptcy appeals pending more than six months, all Social Security appeal cases pending more than six months, and all civil cases pending more than three years.

== All titles ==
- Title I is the "Civil Justice Reform Act of 1990" (CJRA).
- Title II is the "Federal Judgeship Act of 1990".
- Title III is the "Federal Courts Study Committee Implementation Act of 1990."
- Title IV is the "Judicial Discipline and Removal Reform Act of 1990."
- Title V is the "Television Program Improvement Act of 1990."
- Title VI is the "Visual Artists Rights Act of 1990." Title VII is the "Architectural Works Copyright Protection Act."
- Title VIII is the "Computer Software Rental Amendments Act of 1990."
