= Borris Miles =

American politician (born 1965)

Borris L. Miles
- Miles in 2025

Member of the Texas Senate from the 13th district
- Incumbent
- Assumed office January 10, 2017
- Preceded by: Rodney Ellis

Member of the Texas House of Representatives from the 146th district
- In office January 11, 2011 – January 10, 2017
- Preceded by: Al Edwards
- Succeeded by: Shawn Thierry
- In office January 9, 2007 – January 13, 2009
- Preceded by: Al Edwards
- Succeeded by: Al Edwards

Personal details
- Born: October 29, 1965 (age 60) Sunnyside, Houston, Texas, U.S.
- Party: Democratic
- Spouse: Cydonii Fairfax Miles
- Education: Sam Houston State University (BS)
- Occupation: Insurance broker; politician
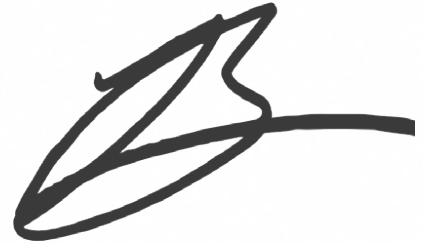
- Signature
- Website: Office website

Borris L. Miles (born October 29, 1965), is a Democratic politician from Texas. He has represented District 13 in the Texas Senate since winning election in November 2016. He is a former member of the Texas House of Representatives, where he represented District 146, which encompasses parts of Harris County, Texas, including Sunnyside, Houston, and Third Ward, Houston.

== Early life and education ==
Miles grew up in Sunnyside, Houston, where he attended Yates High School. After high school, he received his Bachelor of Science degree in criminal justice and criminal science from Sam Houston State University.

== Texas House of Representatives ==
Miles was first elected to serve as the State Representative for District 146 in November 2006. He was re-elected in November 2010, and was sworn back into the House of Representatives in January 2011 and again in January 2013. Miles' next term, in the 84th legislative session, began in January 2015.

Miles was named a "Star of the 2011 Legislative Session" by the Texas Classroom Teachers Association.

As a member of the Agriculture & Livestock Committee, he authored and passed bills to aid in the advancement of urban farm microenterprises. Miles authored and passed HB 2994, a bill designed to provide financial assistance to urban agriculture research facilities, cooperatives, and small agricultural farms and businesses.

In the 83rd Texas Legislative Session, Miles was appointed to the Elections and Licensing & Administrative Procedures committees by Speaker Joe Straus.

== Texas Senate ==
Miles became a state senator in 2017.

== Personal life ==
Miles is a resident of Houston, and is married to Cydonni Fairfax Miles. Miles is a member of the Theta Mu chapter of Alpha Phi Alpha fraternity.

Miles conceived the Hip Hop 4 HIV program in 2007. The program was designed to combat the rising AIDS epidemic in the African American and Latino communities. Radio station 97.9 The Box and the City of Houston put on a free hip hop concert for those willing to be tested for HIV.

Miles has sickle cell anemia. He is Catholic.

== Legal troubles ==
=== Deadly conduct allegations ===
In April 2008, Miles was indicted on two counts of deadly conduct. The first charge came after Miles allegedly pulled a gun on a Texas Southern University regent and his wife during a Houston Rockets game. The second charge involved a man who pressed charges against Miles after Miles allegedly crashed a party at a hotel, forcibly kissed a woman, and threatened a local businessman while brandishing a weapon. Miles allegedly told the man "You don't know what I'm capable of doing."

In a January 2009 trial, Miles was acquitted on both counts.

=== Sexual harassment allegations ===
In December 2017, The Daily Beast published an article containing numerous sexual harassment allegations against Miles. After the publication of the article, Democratic State Senator Sylvia Garcia called for an investigation into the allegations. In 2024, Miles was accused of groping a female political consultant in 2016.

Texas House of Representatives
| Preceded by Al Edwards | Member of the Texas House of Representatives from the 146th district 2007–2009 | Succeeded by Al Edwards |
| Preceded by Al Edwards | Member of the Texas House of Representatives from the 146th district 2011–2017 | Succeeded by Shawn Thierry |
Texas Senate
| Preceded by Rodney Ellis | Member of the Texas Senate from the 13th district 2017–present | Incumbent |
