= George Washington Grover House =

Historic house in Texas, United States

- U.S. National Historic Landmark District – Contributing property
- U.S. Historic district – Contributing property
- Recorded Texas Historic Landmark
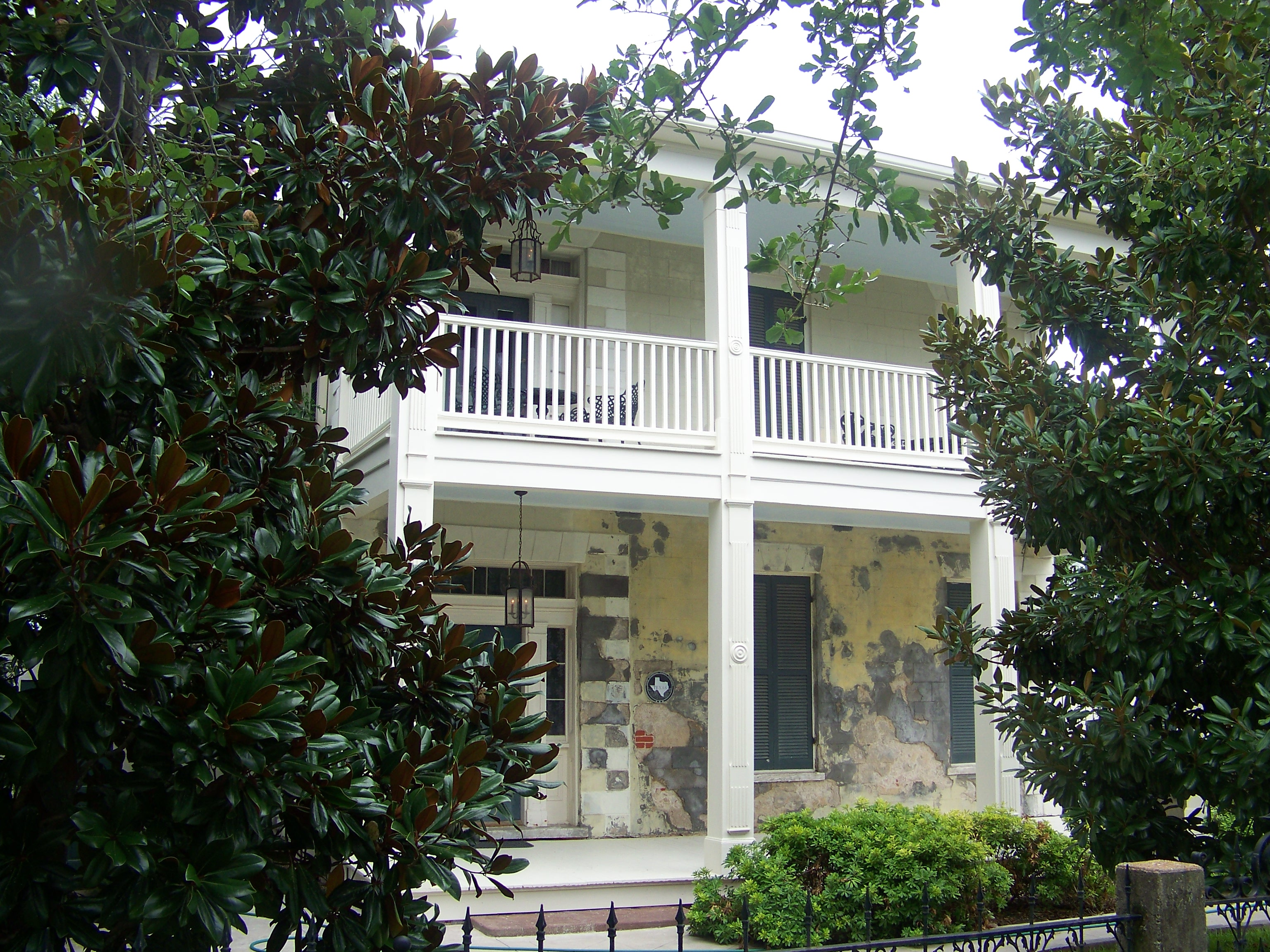
- Grover House in 2016
- Location: 1520 Market St., Galveston, Texas
- Coordinates: 29°18′29″N 94°47′8″W
- Built: 1858-1859
- Part of: East End Historic District (ID75001979)
- RTHL No.: 7479

Significant dates
- Designated NHLDCP: May 11, 1976
- Designated CP: May 30, 1975
- Designated RTHL: 1976

The George Washington Grover House is a two-story house located at 1520 Market (Avenue D) in the East End Historic District of Galveston, Texas. Built in 1859, the house is one of the oldest brick residences in the city.

== George Washington Grover ==
The Grover House is named for its builder, George Washington Grover, a Texan pioneer. After his birth on November 9, 1819, in Sackets Harbor, New York, Grover spent his childhood in Cincinnati, Ohio. In 1839, his father Nathan Grover moved the family to a farm seven miles south of Austin, Texas, joining the ranks of other early Texas settlers. On August 11, 1840, Grover fought on behalf of the Republic of Texas against a Comanche-led war party at the Battle of Plum Creek.

=== The Santa Fe Expedition ===
The following year, George W. Grover volunteered to serve the Republic of Texas once again, this time as part of the artillery company in a trade expedition to Santa Fe, then a Mexican city claimed by the Republic. Upon the arrival of the expedition in Santa Fe, Grover was among the members selected to meet with the Mexican contingent. The endeavor proved to be disastrous when a Texan officer surrendered all of the men to the Mexican authorities. As prisoners, Grover and his cohorts marched all the way to Mexico City, where they remained until April 1842. While detained, he edited a weekly newspaper called True Blue under the pseudonyms “Simon Pure” and “Snooks.” In a total of six issues written by hand from April and May 1842, the single-page newspaper reported on the expedition and prison life.

=== Return to the U.S. and Travels ===
After his release from Mexico City, Grover returned to Cincinnati, where he married Hepzy Dana Andrews in May 1844. The marriage was tragically brief as Hepzy died of unknown causes the following September. Grover remained in Cincinnati until February 1849, when he and childhood friend Wright Andrews joined a gold expedition to California. After departing from New Orleans, they made stops in Panama and, after their ship was blown off course by a Pacific storm, Hawaii. When they finally reached San Francisco, Grover and Andrews established a supply store and mined for gold. In their return trip, their gold was lost during a boat fire. Grover was later involved in a second boat fire when the steamship Louisiana of Port Lavaca caught fire off the coast of Galveston, killing forty people.

=== Relocating to Galveston ===
In 1850 Grover traveled to Galveston, Texas with the intention of settling. By December 1851, Wright Andrews and his brother Henry Andrews had joined him. The trio formed a wholesale and retail grocery and ship chandlery business. After Henry left the partnership in 1852, Grover and Wright Andrews opened their mercantile house in the heart of the city's emerging commercial district at the northwest corner of Strand and 22nd Street. In August 1852, Grover married Eliza Ann Crane, the daughter of Ambrose Byron Crane, Galveston's Deputy Collector of Customs serving under Gail Borden.

== Construction of the House ==
In 1858 or 1859, Grover purchased a lot at 1520 Market (then designated 460 East Market) with the intention of building a house for his growing family. Though the architect of the house is unknown, Research has revealed the sources of some of the building materials:

- The bricks, created on Galveston Island at James M. Brown's brickyard, match those used by Brown to construct his own house, the 1859 Ashton Villa at 2328 Broadway (Avenue J).
- Pine flooring came from Pensacola, Florida.
- Marble window sills came from Vermont.
- Granite steps to the western entrance came from New Hampshire.

Nick White, an Irish-born slater and plasterer, applied stucco to the bricks and scored it to simulate masonry units in a technique that was called "rough casting." In 1872, the Galveston Daily News referenced White's work on the Grover House, saying that “it looks to-day almost as good as new. It certainly improves the appearance of a building most-wonderfully.”

=== Layout and Design ===
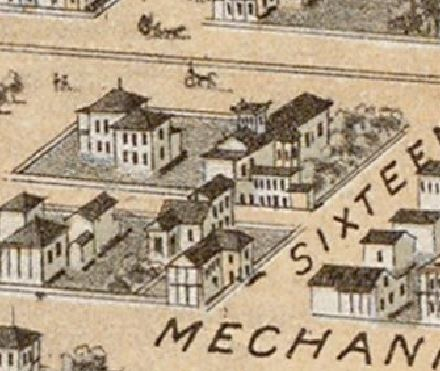
The Grover House as seen in an 1871 Bird's Eye drawing.

The house sits on a property covering over three lots between 15th and 16th streets on the north side of Market street inside Galveston's East End Historic District. The brick structure of the house is covered with beige stucco scored to give the visual impression of cut stone. The existing hipped roof was added to the building in 1943. The original roof had a cupola, which was accessible via steps in the house's third story. A 1943 hurricane destroyed two stories on the north (rear) side of the house.

The three-bay south façade has a double gallery, which is not original to the house. The gallery was altered or expanded three times during the twentieth century. In the current configuration, the galleries are accessible from the interior of both stories via doors on the western ends of the south facade. The first-story door, with an architrave featuring colored glass, pilasters, sidelights, and a transom, serves as the house's primary entrance. The lintels of the windows on the south facade have stucco scored to simulate heavy keystones. The sills, original to the house, are made of white Vermont marble.

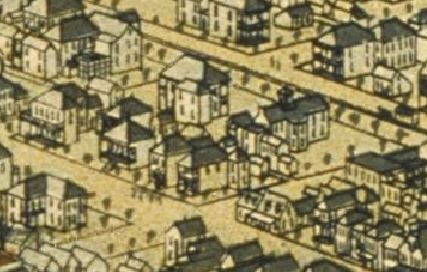
The Grover House as seen in an 1885 Bird's Eye drawing.

The house is one of the oldest surviving brick residences in Galveston. According to the recollections of Grover's son Walter, the house may have been the second largest dwelling in Galveston (after Ashton Villa) upon its completion. The earliest documented description of the house, published in 1936, provides an overview of the house's interior:

ceilings of unusual height, bordered with attractive hand-made friezes, and with hand-made center designs built about the ceiling gas fixtures. Throughout the house are hand-cut stained glass panes, and all window and door sills are of marble. The ′mantel and hearth in the great parlor on the ground floor are of black marble, and the fireplace on the second floor is of white marble. The old kitchen at the rear was built over a large underground cistern which supplied water to firemen when fires broke out nearby. Two other cisterns and a cellar are under the house, and one of the cisterns is still being used, supplying the family with cool water during summer months.

== Grover's Life in Galveston ==
After its construction, the Grover House “became a social center,” according to Walter Grover, who later recalled that “many gay parties were held there, and, according to the custom of the time, friends and relatives visited there from distant places and enjoyed their hospitality.”

=== The Battle of Galveston ===
The firm of Grover and Andrews operated from the Strand until 1861, when the firm dissolved upon the outset of the Civil War. In that year, Grover was elected city alderman. He went on to serve as Galveston Mayor pro tem during the war after other members of the city government retreated to Virginia Point. When the Union Army took control of the city, Grover met their officers. After the deaths of Union leaders Captain Jonathan Mayhew Wainwright and Lieutenant Commander Edward Lea during the Battle of Galveston on January 1, 1863, Grover offered his own family's plot in the Episcopal section of Galveston's Broadway Cemetery for their burial. Following the war, Grover's respectful treatment of Union soldiers was a subject of controversy in Galveston. Newspaper accounts of his election reveal a lingering debate over his actions as late as 1869.

=== Late career ===
By 1870, Grover had launched his own grocery company at the old Grover and Andrews location at 22nd Street and Strand. An advertisement in the 1872 Galveston City Directory lists the firm as retail dealers in “family supplies, produce and boat stores.” The company was out of business by 1874. Between 1874 and 1881, Grover was an employee of Rice and Baulard, sellers of paints and oils from a store at 213-217 23rd Street. Grover was an artist himself and two of his works survive as important portrayals of mid-nineteenth-century Galveston. The first depicts the capture of the U.S.R.C Harriet Lane during the Battle of Galveston. The second famous painting, “Galveston as Seen from the Main Top of Ship at Central Wharf – October, 1855”, was given to the Rosenberg Library by the Galveston Historical Foundation and restored in 1968. In his later years, Grover remained active recounting his early exploits in the Battle of Plum Creek, the Santa Fe Expedition, the Gold Rush, and the Battle of Galveston. He died on December 21, 1901, after a fall. His wife, Eliza died in 1913 as one of the oldest citizens in Galveston.

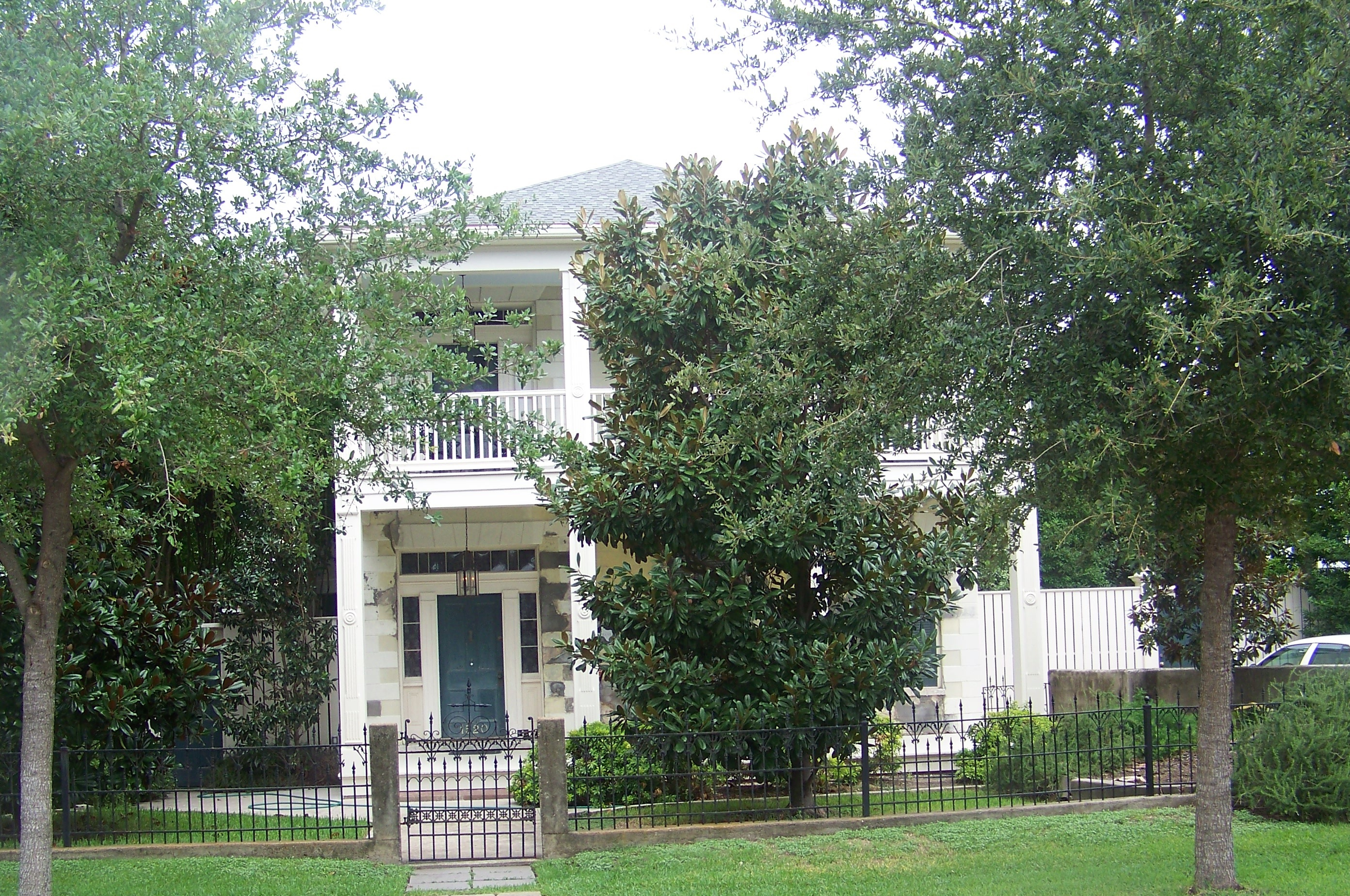
The Grover House in 2016

== Preservation Efforts ==
Thanks to relatively stable ownership and the preservation projects, the Grover House retains a remarkable amount of its original integrity. A substantial rehabilitation project during the 1990s included restoration of some distinctive features of the house, including its scored stucco. Some mid-century alterations, including changes to the east elevation of the house, were replaced with features from the house's original design.

The house incurred flood damage during Hurricane Ike of 2008. An oak tree in the front yard, which had withstood the devastating 1900 Galveston Hurricane, did not survive. All of the damage from Hurricane Ike has been repaired and the historic masonry is subject to ongoing observation.

The house listed on the National Register of Historic Places as a contributing member of the East End Historic District.

== See also ==
- List of National Historic Landmarks in Texas
- National Register of Historic Places listings in Galveston County, Texas
- Recorded Texas Historic Landmarks in Galveston County
