= Rodney Ellis =

American politician (born 1954)

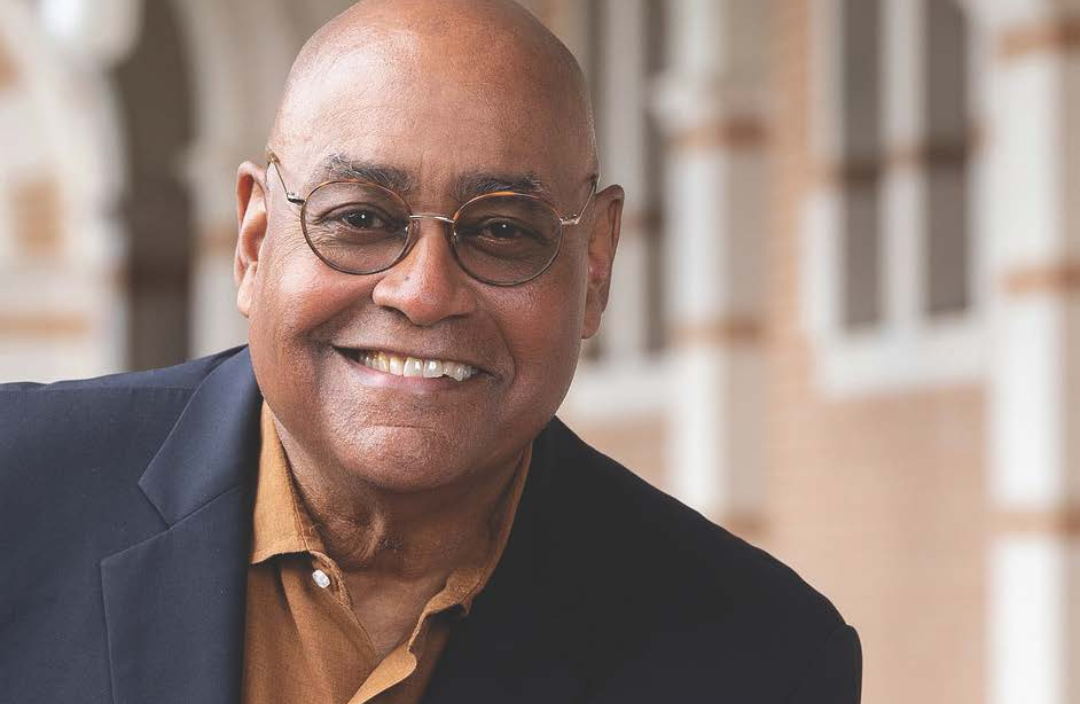
- Ellis in 2024

Harris County Commissioner Precinct 1
- Incumbent
- Assumed office January 1, 2017
- Preceded by: El Franco Lee

Member of the Texas Senate from the 13th district
- In office February 27, 1990 – December 31, 2016
- Preceded by: Craig Washington
- Succeeded by: Borris Miles

Member of the Houston City Council from District D
- In office January 2, 1983 – December 28, 1988
- Preceded by: Anthony Hall
- Succeeded by: Alfred Calloway

Personal details
- Born: April 7, 1954 (age 72) Houston, Texas, U.S.
- Party: Democratic
- Spouse: Licia Green (m. 1997)
- Children: 4
- Education: Texas Southern University (BA); University of Texas at Austin (MPA, JD)
- Profession: Lawyer
- Website: Office website Campaign website

Rodney Glenn Ellis (born April 7, 1954) is an American politician who has served on the Harris County Commissioners Court Precinct 1 since 2017. He is a member of the Democratic Party.

Ellis was elected to represent the Texas' 13th state senate district in the Texas Senate on February 13, 1990, and sworn into office on February 27, 1990. The district contains portions of Harris County, including downtown Houston, and Fort Bend County. In his 26-year tenure, Ellis passed 700 pieces of legislation. Ellis sat on the Senate State Affairs, Transportation, and Business & Commerce Committees. In previous sessions, Ellis chaired the Senate Finance, Jurisprudence, Government Organization, Intergovernmental Relations, and Open Government Committees.

On June 25, 2016, Ellis won the Democratic Party's nomination for Harris County Commissioners Court Precinct 1. He was elected county commissioner on November 8, 2016 and sworn into office on January 1, 2017.

== Early life and education ==
Ellis, from the Sunnyside neighborhood in Houston, is one of three children of Elijha and Oliver Teresa Ellis. His father worked as a yard man and his mother a maid. Both parents worked as health care assistants. In the summers, Ellis served as his father's assistant.

Ellis attended B.H. Grimes Elementary and Carter G. Woodson Middle School before graduating from Evan E. Worthing High School, where he was president of the student council. He enrolled at Xavier University in Louisiana but returned to Texas to attend Texas Southern University, where he graduated with a Bachelor of Arts degree in political science. Ellis earned his Masters in Public Affairs from the University of Texas Lyndon B. Johnson School of Public Affairs and then a J.D. degree from the University of Texas School of Law.

While in Austin, Ellis got experience in Texas government, working as an aide to Lieutenant Governor Bill Hobby and as Law Clerk to Chief Justice John C. Phillips on the Third Court of Appeals. Ellis also served as legal counsel to Texas Railroad Commissioner Buddy Temple before moving to Washington, DC to become chief of staff for U.S. Representative Mickey Leland.

It was through Congressman Leland that Ellis first met his future wife Licia. They were married in 1997. Their family includes four children: Nicole, Maria, Leland, and Alena.

== City Council record ==
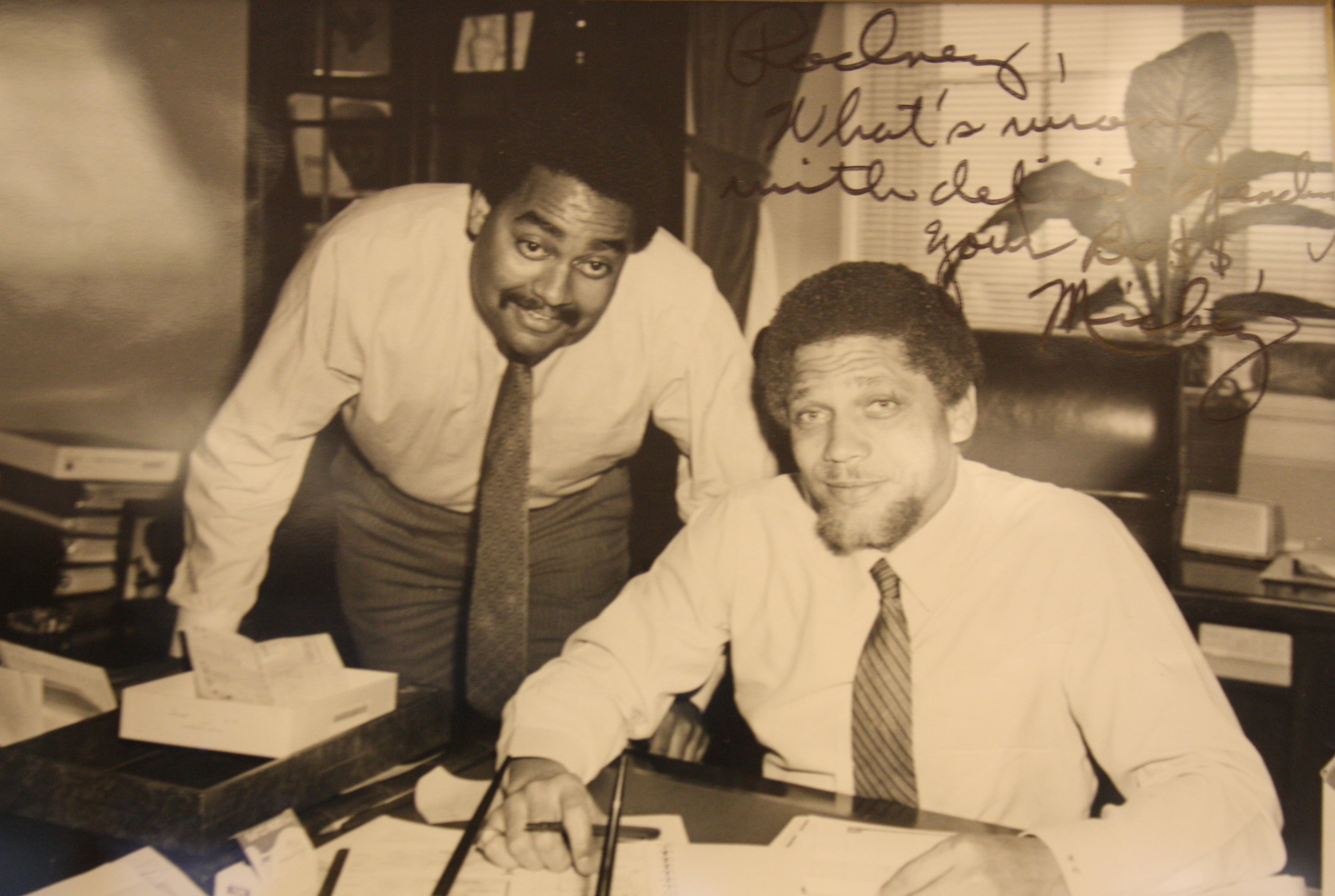
Ellis and Congressman Mickey Leland, for whom Ellis served as chief of staff

In 1983, at age 29, Ellis was elected to the Houston City Council, where he served three terms representing District D. While on Council, Ellis worked on efforts to tear down abandoned buildings that had attracted criminals and the drug trade. He worked to secure more funds to raze these dangerous buildings, and drove a front-loader to help clean up drug-ridden Houston neighborhoods. To combat rising drug crime, Ellis pushed to increase funding for anti-drug efforts in the city, but also called for greater community oversight of the Houston Police Department through a citizen's review board.

Ellis worked to increase funding to expand low-income housing projects across Houston, preserve Allen Parkway Village, and strengthen policies for the city's use of federal funds from the Department of Housing and Urban Development to ensure a greater percentage is devoted to low and moderate-income Texans. Ellis also worked to seize abandoned properties and sell on the market to raise funds for housing and other vital needs.

Ellis served as chair of the Economic Redevelopment Committee, where he advocated policies to spur economic development in Houston. He called for the creation of a new think tank and the city Department of Commerce to coordinate and streamline city economic development policies, worked to save city and taxpayer investments in projects such as the Palm Center and Mercado del Sol shopping center, and pushed to expand low-interest loans to small businesses.

Ellis pushed to rename Houston Intercontinental Airport after Mickey Leland, following his death on an anti-hunger mission to Ethiopia. Controversy ensued after comments were made about the effort by a fellow council member. In the end, the newest terminal at the airport was named in honor of Leland.

In the battle against apartheid in South Africa, Ellis helped convince the University of Houston to become the first university in the south to divest from companies doing business in South Africa. He also helped defeat efforts to merge the University of Houston–Downtown with Texas Southern University, protecting the historically black college's history and mission as a stand-alone institution.

== Texas Senate record ==
=== Budget & economy ===
In 1997, Ellis authored legislation to create the Texas Capital Access Fund that provided up to $140 million in private lending to small businesses and nonprofit organizations. The program was designed to help small businesses that do not qualify for conventional financing to access the capital they need through a public-private partnership.

In 1999, Ellis introduced and passed a $506 million tax relief package that created a three-day sales tax holiday, eliminated the sales tax on over-the-counter medicines, and cut business taxes. The tax holiday was designed to give Texans a tax break on items such as back-to-school clothing and supplies. In 2021, the Texas Comptroller’s Office estimated shoppers would save an estimated $107.3 million in state and local sales tax during the sales tax holiday.

As the chair of the Senate Committee on Finance in 2001, Ellis authored the $113.8 billion budget bill. The population of Texas had grown 25 percent in the prior 10 years and the pressure of that continued growth was reflected in a budget that raised funding $11.8 billion, or 11.6 percent over the previous biennium. As chair of the Finance Committee, Ellis managed, in spite of the tight budget, to fund four priority items: a major Medicaid expansion, state employee pay raises, teacher health insurance, and financial aid for college students."

The Texas Green Jobs Act of 2009, authored by Ellis, was amended onto House Bill 1935, establishing the first statewide green jobs program in Texas. The program set up a framework for training workers for skills in the clean energy economy.

=== Civil rights ===
In 1993, Ellis introduced the Motor Voter program to allow citizens to register to vote when they renew their driver's licenses. To further increase participation in the democratic process, Ellis introduced legislation to implement the National Voter Registration Act of 1993 in Texas in 1995 in order to bring Texas up to federal standards by requiring government agencies to afford citizens a chance to register to vote each time they seek state services through government agencies.

In 2001, Ellis authored and passed the James Byrd Jr. Hate Crimes Act, legislation to clarify and strengthen the state's hate crimes statute by defining a hate crime as one that has been proven in court to have been motivated by "the race, religion, color, disability, sexual orientation, national origin or ancestry" of the victim. The Act bears the name of James Byrd Jr., an African American who was targeted and murdered in one of the most brutal hate crimes of the post-Civil Rights Era. In 2009, President Barack Obama signed into law a federal hate crimes bill also bearing Byrd's name.

In 2007, Ellis introduced and passed the Stop the Genocide Act, requiring state pension funds to divest from companies doing business in Sudan. Over the four years prior to the bill's introduction, the Sudanese government and its allied organizations had killed more than 400,000 people and displaced more than 2.5 million in Sudan's Darfur region.

Ellis helped pass the Free Flow of Information Act in 2009 to protect journalists from being forced to testify or disclose confidential sources. The law aimed to balance the public's right to know the truth from an independent press and the state's ability to uphold justice.

In 2009, Ellis introduced and passed legislation creating the Holocaust and Genocide Commission, a volunteer commission that serves as a conduit of information to public schools, private schools, and organizations regarding the Holocaust and acts of genocide.

=== Health care ===
In 1993, Ellis authored and passed legislation requiring private nonprofit hospitals to provide a certain amount of charity care to uninsured patients.

In 2001, under Ellis' leadership as Chairman of the Texas Senate Committee on Finance, the legislature increased funding for health and human services by $5.1 billion. The budget simplified Medicaid eligibility by eliminating face-to-face interviews and allowed families to apply through the mail or over the telephone. The budget also allocated $197 million to increase reimbursement rates for doctors, dentists, and hospitals; provided $63 million to maintain current services at Mental Health & Mental Retardation state schools, hospitals, and community centers; provided $1.025 billion for the Children's Health Insurance Program; and allocated $104 million to improve care in state schools and nursing homes.

In 2011, Ellis amended the Texas Department of Insurance sunset legislation to include a provision that will increase access to individual health insurance plans in order to expand the availability of coverage to children under 19.

In 2011, Ellis sponsored legislation that ensures a voice for advocates and individuals infected with HIV in the state's HIV Medication Advisory Committee.

=== Criminal justice ===
Since his tenure in the Texas Senate, Ellis has been one of the nation’s leaders in criminal justice reform, including an overhaul of the state's indigent defense system, identifying and studying the factors that contribute to wrongful convictions, and increasing compensation for the wrongfully imprisoned.

On a national level, Ellis was chairman of the Innocence Project in New York for 14 years. The nonprofit organization works to free the innocent, prevent wrongful convictions, and create fair, compassionate, and equitable systems of justice for everyone. In 2016, the Innocence Project honored Ellis and others for their contributions to the organization.

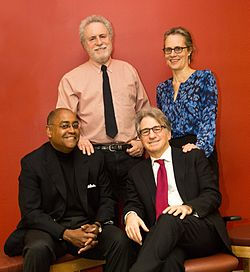
Ellis with Innocence Project founders Barry Scheck and Peter Neufeld and executive director Madeline deLone, 2013.

As a county commissioner, he continued to carry the torch for indigent defendants by increasing Harris County Public Defenders Office’s budget and leading Commissioners Court to approving misdemeanor bail reform (more details below under Harris County Commissioners Court)..

For his work on criminal justice reforms, Ellis was named "Texan of the Year" by the Dallas Morning News on December 26, 2015, along with Senator John Whitmire and Representative Ruth McClendon. The Dallas Morning News wrote that "the measures [Ellis] championed this year — and in previous legislative sessions — have targeted every major facet of flawed criminal justice, from prosecutors' reliance on junk science (such as bite-mark evidence) and flawed eyewitness testimony, to holding overzealous prosecutors accountable and improving public-defender funding so indigents can't be railroaded into prison."

In 2001, Ellis authored and passed the Texas Fair Defense Act to overhaul the state's indigent defense system by focusing on four critical issues: timely appointment of counsel, method of counsel appointment by the courts, reporting of information about indigent representation services, and minimum standards for counsel. The legislation required all criminal courts in Texas to adopt formal procedures for providing appointed lawyers to indigent defendants.

The Texas Fair Defense Act also created a new state indigent defense commission, the Task Force on Indigent Defense (now called the Texas Indigent Defense Commission), to oversee the implementation of the Texas Fair Defense Act and administer a new state program for awarding indigent defense grants to counties.

In 2009, Ellis sponsored and passed legislation to establish the Tim Cole Advisory Panel to identify and study the factors that contribute to wrongful convictions. The panel was named in honor of Tim Cole, a young man who died in prison after being wrongfully convicted of rape.

The Tim Cole Advisory Panel's work led Ellis in 2011 to author a package of legislation to reform and improve the reliability of the Texas criminal justice system. Those improvements included eyewitness identification reforms to address the leading cause of proven wrongful convictions, and legislation to ensure that DNA evidence can and will be tested—if available—to prove someone's innocence.

In 2009, Ellis authored and passed legislation to create the Office of Capital Writs, the state's first statewide public defender office, to manage death penalty appeals. Texas has the highest number of executions since 1979 - over four times the next state with the second highest number. Texas also has a high number of wrongful convictions relative to other states. The Office of Capital Writs is "entrusted with advocating on behalf of indigent individuals sentenced to death in Texas. The office works within the judicial system to safeguard the Constitutional rights of the individual through high quality legal representation."

Ellis has "led legislative efforts to increase compensation for the wrongfully imprisoned." In 2001, Ellis authored and passed legislation that increased the amount of compensation, increased the statute of limitations for claiming compensation, and allowed convicted persons found to be innocent to seek relief and compensation from the courts, rather than by pardon. In 2011, Ellis sponsored and passed comprehensive exoneree compensation reform legislation, which provided health care to the wrongfully convicted, established standards for attorney's fees in compensation claims, and helped exonerees to receive compensation.

In 2013, Ellis authored and passed the "Michael Morton Act," legislation creating a uniform, statutory open file criminal discovery policy in Texas. With the bill's passage, Texas law now explicitly states that every prosecutor has a duty to disclose documents or information that could raise questions about a defendant's guilt or lead to a lighter sentence if there is a conviction. Prior to the bill's passage, Texas' criminal discovery laws had not changed since they were initially adopted in 1965. The bill was named after Michael Morton, who was wrongfully convicted of murdering his wife and subsequently spent almost 25 years in prison before being exonerated by DNA evidence.

In 2015, Ellis sponsored and passed legislation creating the Tim Cole Exoneration Review Commission. The Commission brings together criminal justice experts to review proven wrongful convictions, identify the main causes of those convictions, and recommend more reliable practices to improve public safety and prevent such tragedies from reoccurring in the future. The Commission is named after Tim Cole, a Texas Tech University student who was wrongfully convicted of a crime he did not commit. Cole died in prison in 1999 after 25 years behind bars. He became the state's first and only posthumous exoneration in 2009, and Governor Rick Perry later pardoned Cole in 2010.

=== Higher education ===
In 1999, Ellis sponsored legislation that created the TEXAS Grant Program. The program provides tuition and fees to qualified students to make sure that well-prepared high school graduates with financial need could go to college. Since 1999, when the 76th Texas Legislature authorized the Towards EXcellence, Access, and Success (TEXAS) Grant Program, the state of Texas has invested over $4 billion in appropriations for the program through 2017 (see Table 10). The program has played a vital role in providing access to a higher education for approximately 490,000 students through the 2015-16 academic year. Today, the state spends $866.4 million for TEXAS Grants over two years to support 82,697 students.

In 2011, Ellis cosponsored legislation to help the University of Houston and other Texas universities become Tier One institutions of higher education.

=== Efficient government and ethics ===
In 1995, Ellis introduced a constitutional amendment to abolish the office of state treasurer. Texas voters endorsed the measure, and the treasurer's office closed its doors on September 1, 1996, transferring its duties to other state agencies.

In 2003, Ellis sponsored comprehensive ethics reform for state and local elected officials. The legislation required any contribution greater than $500 be reported to the Ethics Commission. It also prohibited legislators from representing people for compensation before state agencies; required a legislator to file notice with his or her legislative body before introducing, sponsoring, or voting on a measure for which a close relative is lobbying; required disclosure of all referral fees for legal services; requires disclosure of legislative continuances; and required office holders to show campaign fund balances. The bill also required annual filing of personal financial disclosure statements by municipal candidates and officeholders in cities greater than 100,000 and all members of sports and port and authority boards.

=== Served as governor, lieutenant governor ===
In 1999, Ellis was named President Pro Tempore of the Texas Senate. Normally only a ceremonial position, Ellis served while Governor George W. Bush was running for President of the United States. When Bush traveled out of Texas, Lieutenant Governor Rick Perry was elevated to governor, and Ellis acted as Lieutenant Governor of Texas. If the governor and lieutenant governor are both out of the state, the president pro tempore is acting governor in their absence.

In 1999 and 2000, Ellis served as Acting Governor of Texas for 45 days and was the Lieutenant Governor of Texas for 7 days, 7 hours and 31 minutes. Upon Bush's election as president, Ellis presided over the Texas Senate as it chose Bill Ratliff to serve as its presiding officer.

=== Texas Legislative Internship Program (TLIP) ===
In 1990, Ellis founded the Texas Legislative Internship Program (TLIP).

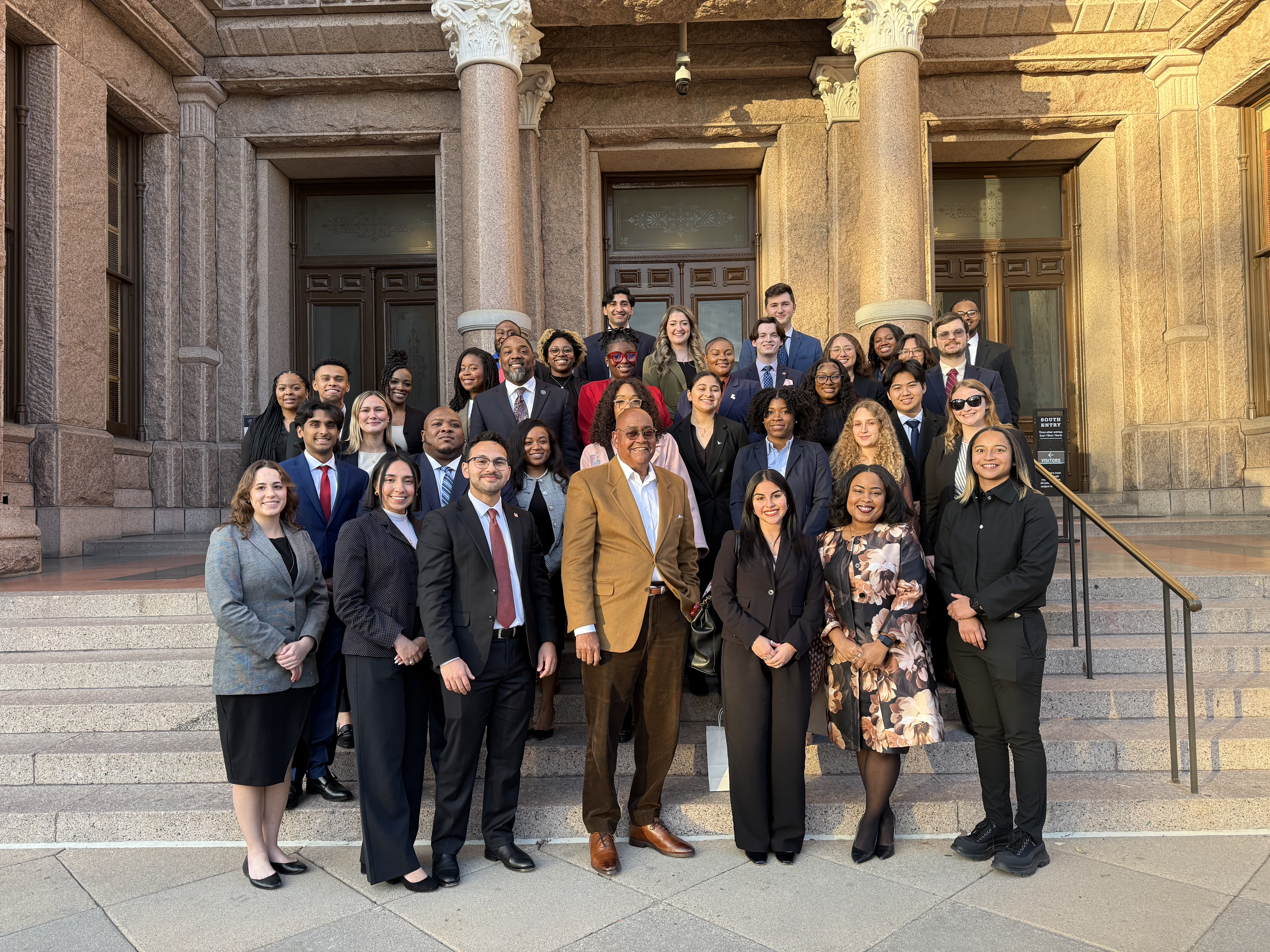
Ellis stands on steps of Texas Capitol with the 2025 TLIP class that helps organizers celebrate the program’s 35th anniversary.

Administered by the Mickey Leland Center on World Hunger and Peace at Texas Southern University, TLIP provides opportunities for undergraduate and graduate students to serve as interns in the Texas Legislature, various state agencies, and local government. Students receive a minimum of six and a maximum of fifteen academic credit hours for participating in the program, which combines academic study and research with supervised practical training. A TLIP internship lasts for one academic semester and affords students an opportunity to experience public service firsthand. In 2011, three members of the Texas House of Representatives were TLIP graduates.

== Harris County Commissioners Court ==
After the death of Harris County Commissioner El Franco Lee in January 2016, Ellis announced that he would be seeking the Precinct 1 seat on Harris County Commissioners Court. On June 25, 2016, Ellis secured the Democratic nomination for the seat and was unopposed on the ballot in November. He won the Democratic nomination a second time in March 2020 with 67% of the votes.

As Commissioner, Ellis has played a critical role on the Court, securing major reforms to the misdemeanor bail system, equity guidelines for flood control projects, higher wages and stronger protections for workers contracting with the county, funding for indigent defense and various forms of direct relief for residents in response to the COVID-19 pandemic.

COVID-19 Response

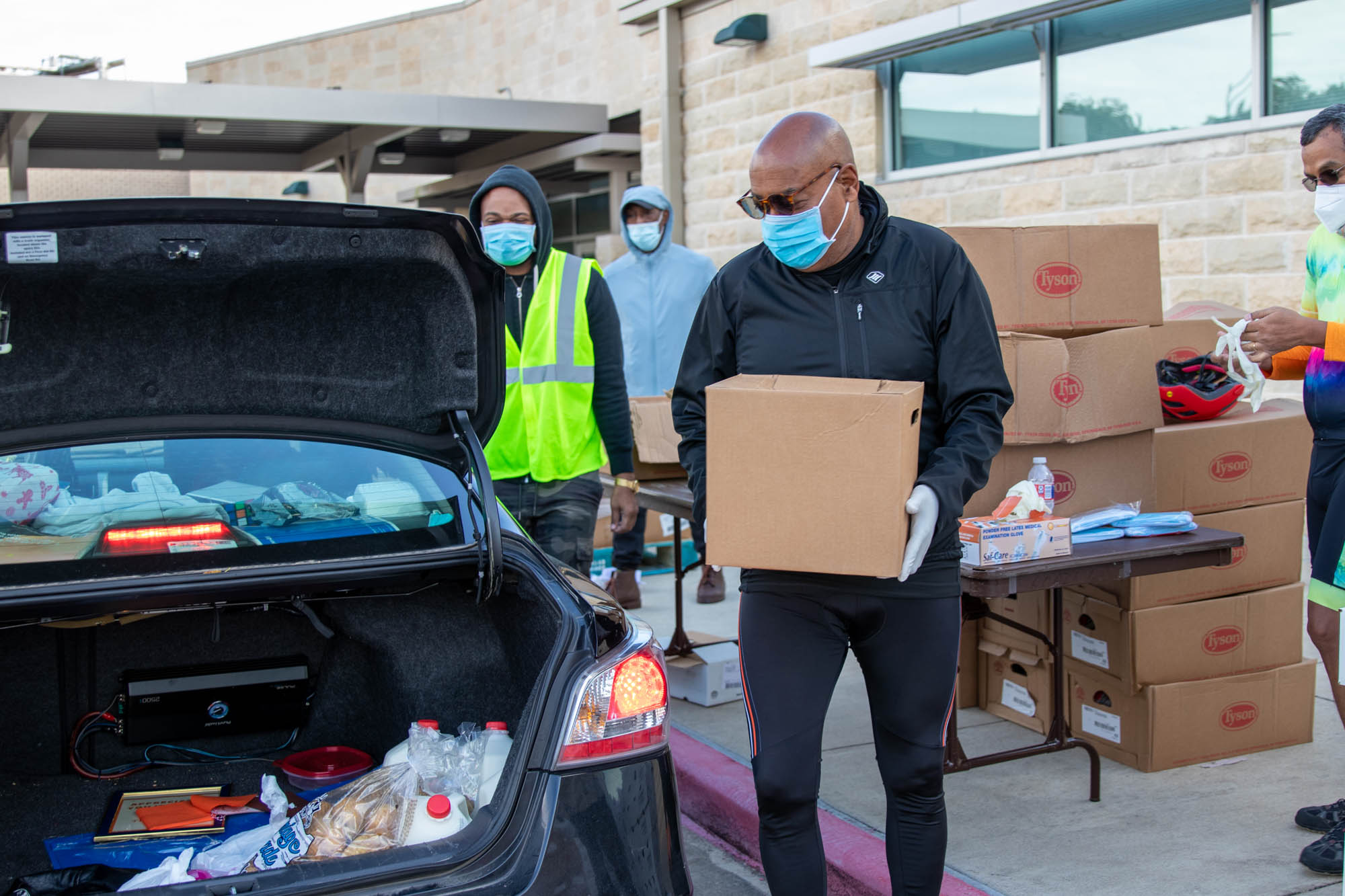
Ellis loads food from the Houston Food Bank into a car during a giveaway for people suffering during the COVID 19 pandemic.

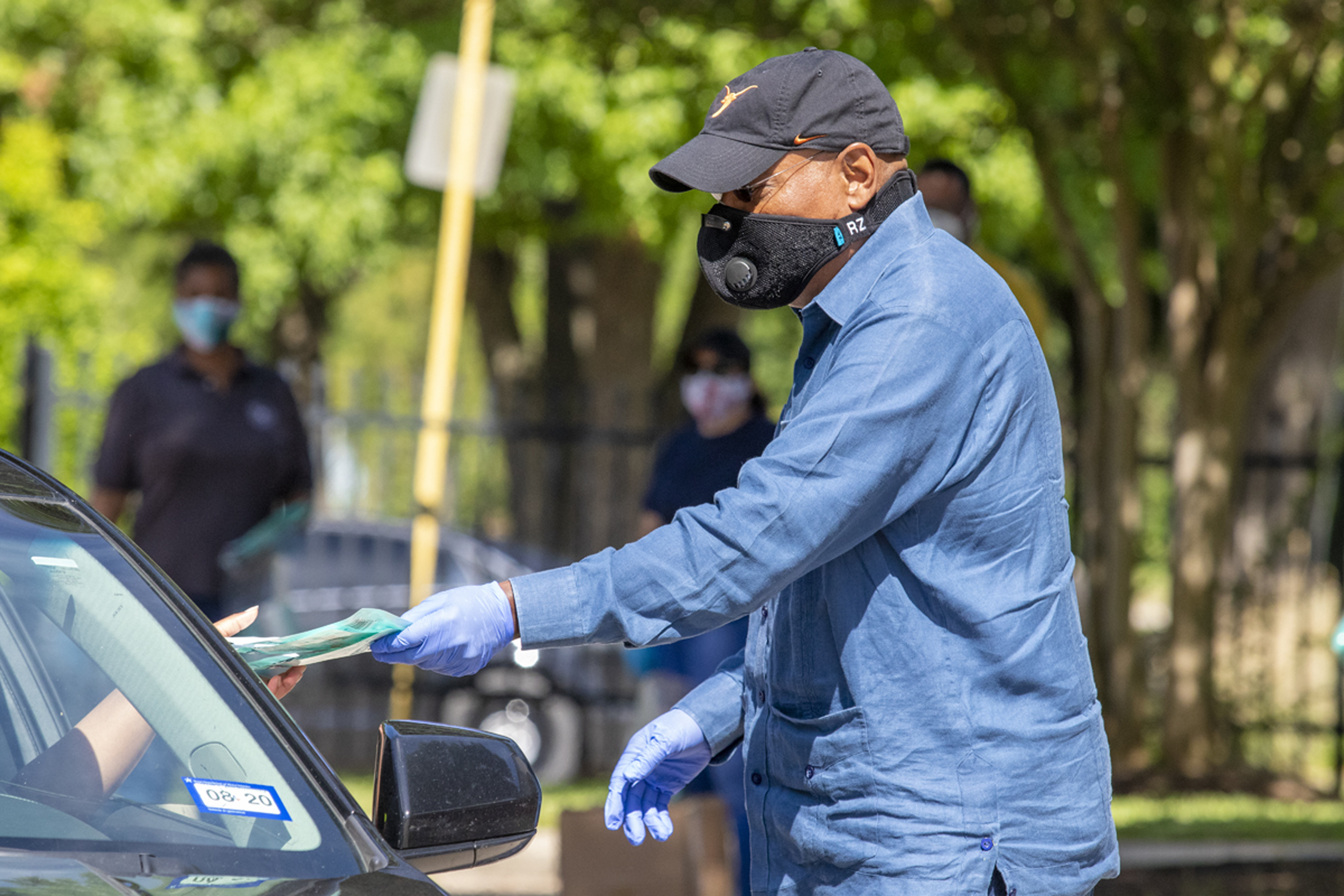
Ellis helps pass out facemasks to protect people from COVID 19.

As Harris County dealt with COVID-19 and the economic fallout, Ellis led the charge to provide direct assistance to residents, starting with a $30 million COVID-19 Relief Fund in May 2020. The Fund targeted the most vulnerable in the county, providing up to $1,500 in assistance regardless of immigration status, dependent status or unemployment status. In July, Commissioners Court approved an additional $40 million for direct assistance to low-income residents.

In April 2020, Ellis and Harris County approved the $10 million Harris County COVID-19 Forgivable Loan Program that offered loans of up to $25,000 with zero percent interest for a five-year term. The loans were aimed at helping small businesses in Harris County stay open and maintain operating expenses. After five years, the loan may be forgiven. The fund provides grants of up to $25,000 to continue to help cover necessary expenses such as rent or mortgage payments, payroll costs, and other operating expenses.

Ellis also voted for a total of $40 million in funding for emergency rental assistance payments for low-income residents to help prevent an eviction crisis in the county. An additional $750,000 in federal money was approved at Ellis’ request to provide legal assistance for renters facing eviction.

Criminal Justice

In February 2019, Commissioner Ellis voted in favor of a budget increase to the Harris County Public Defender’s Office to $9 million, in order to hire 61 new employees, the majority of them lawyers to represent people charged with misdemeanor, felony, and juvenile courts who cannot afford legal representation.

In July 2019, Commissioner Ellis led Commissioner’s Court in approving a historic settlement agreement to change the local misdemeanor bail system found unconstitutional by a local judge for keeping poor people who could not afford bail incarcerated prior to having their case heard. Under the agreement, about 85% of people arrested on misdemeanors will qualify for automatic, no-cash pretrial release. The agreement also included public defense services and safeguards to help ensure defendants show up for court. In September 2020, the first six-month report of the independent monitor in the case found that the reforms did not increase the risk of reoffending.

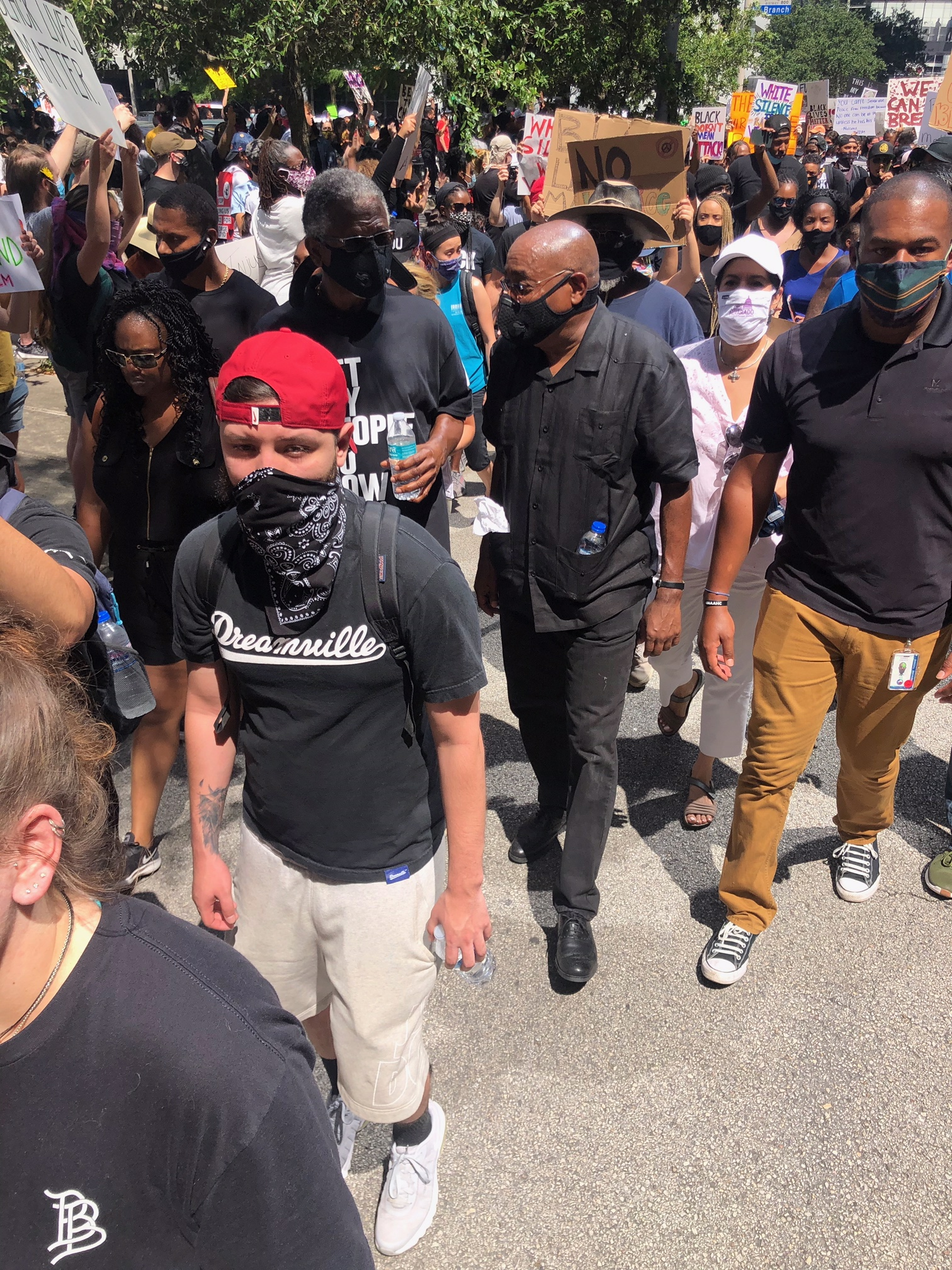
Commissioner Ellis, center, marches during a protest of native Houstonian George Floyd's murder by a Minneapolis, Minnesota police officer.

In June 2020, in response to the death of native Houstonian George Floyd and subsequent nationwide protests against police brutality against Black Americans, Commissioner Ellis led the effort to pass a package of 11 criminal justice reform measures. The measures aimed to provide civilian oversight of police, including an order proposed by Commissioner Ellis for the Justice Administration department to study creating a civilian oversight board to review allegations of the use of force by police as well as $25 million to study alternatives to incarceration.

Voting Rights

In August 2019, Ellis voted to pass a measure to restore voting rights for jail inmates, including setting up a polling location at the Harris County jail for eligible inmates to vote.

In July 2020, Ellis motioned to create an independent election administrator’s office, moving away from splitting election duties between two county departments, the County Clerk and County Tax Assessor-Collector. Ellis claimed that the old system was a relic of Jim Crow and was as much of an insult to voters as having to walk into a polling center named after Robert E. Lee. The move faced opposition, but researchers and voting rights advocates agreed the move will improve voter participation in Harris County.

Economic Justice

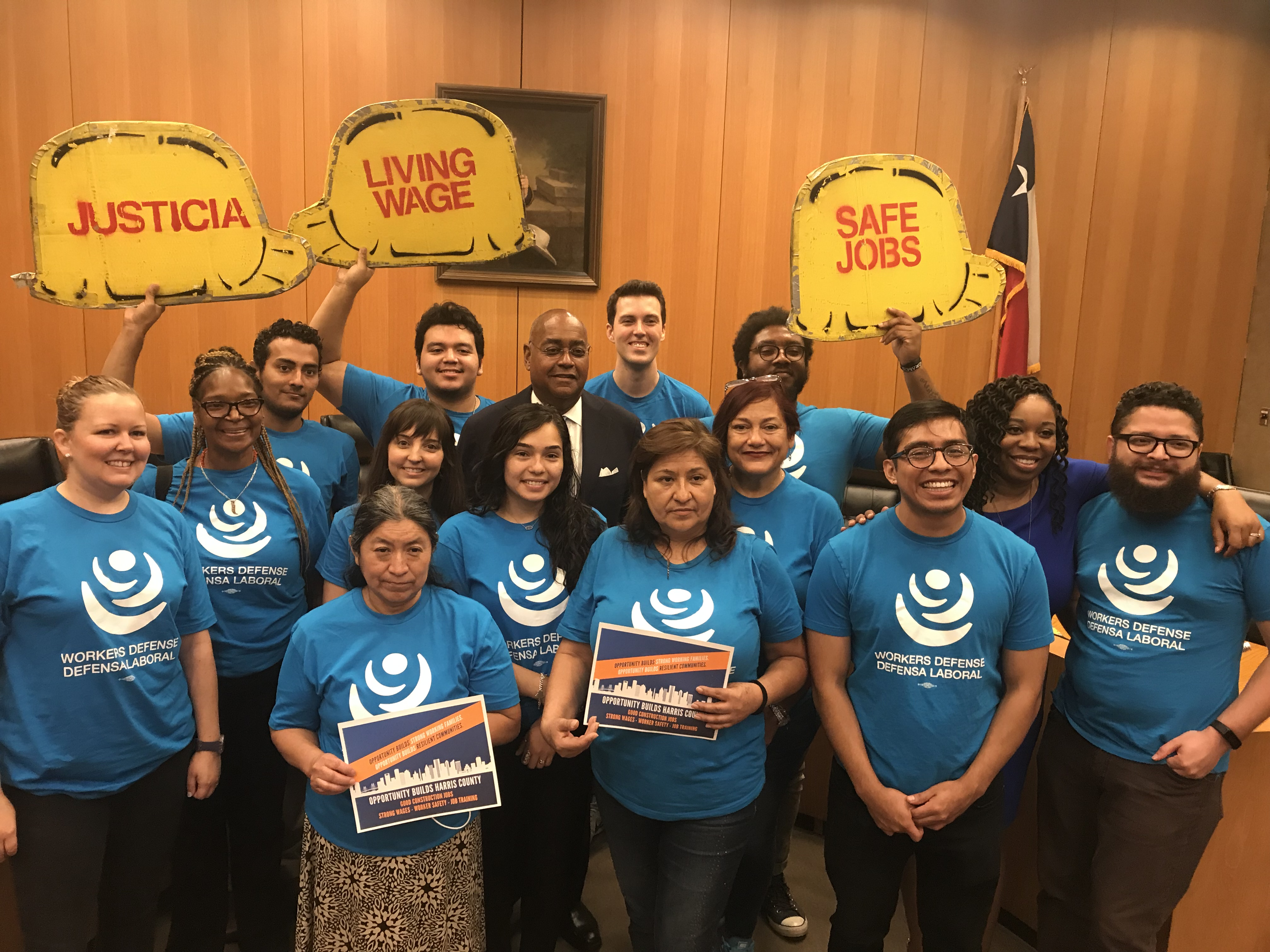
Ellis stands with worker-rights advocates while announcing Opportunity Builds Harris County, which placed stronger worker protection and economic opportunity in Harris County's construction contracting practices.

In July 2018, Ellis led the effort in securing a $600,000 investment, using

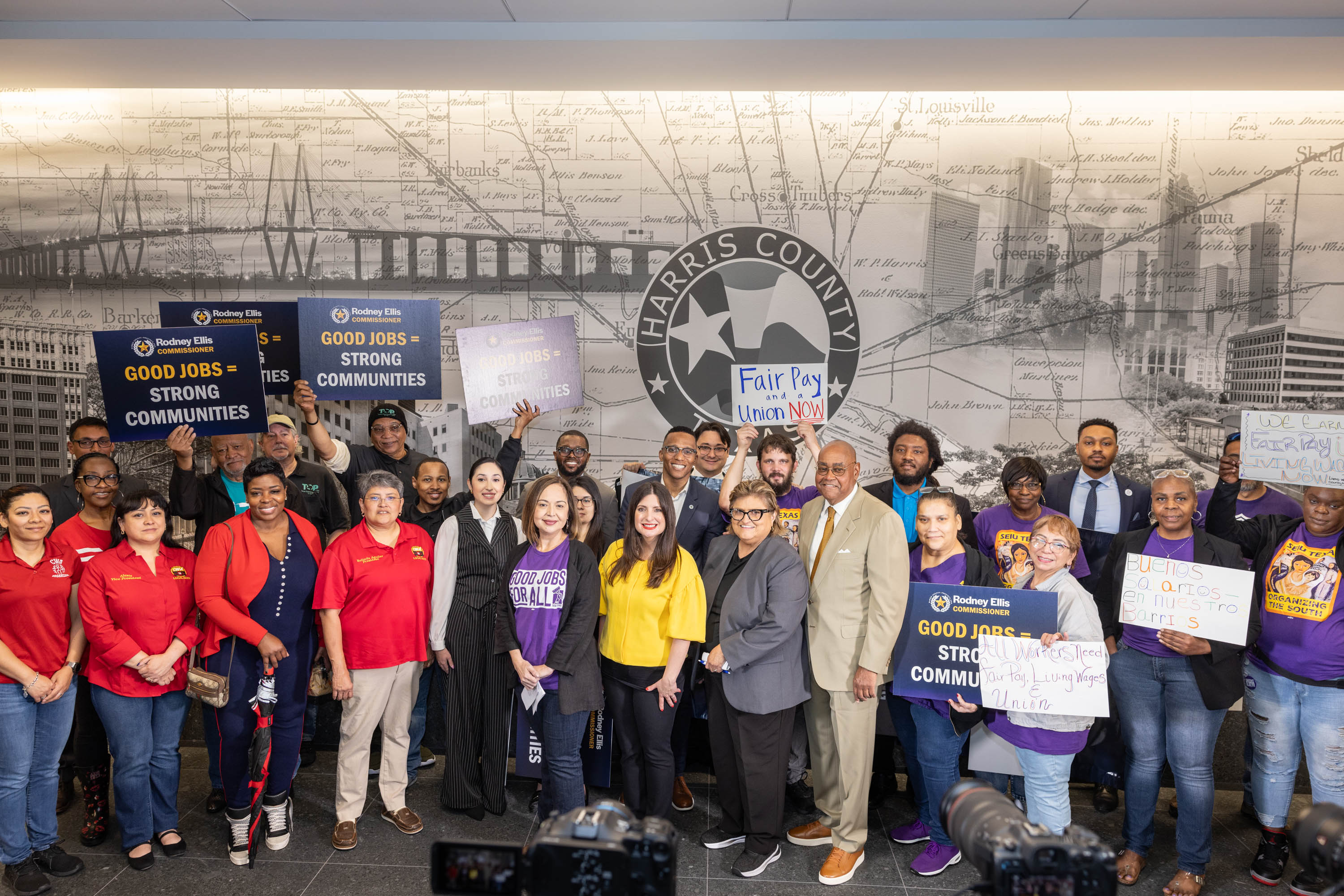
Ellis and county officials join labor leaders to announce a proposal to raise the minimum wage to $21.65 an hour for workers on county-contracted jobs and $20 an hour for county employees.

money from his Precinct, to fund a county-wide disparity study on the county’s use of minority- and women-owned business enterprises (MWBE) for contracting purposes. The disparity study results, published in 2020, showed that minority- and women-owned businesses receive only 9% of Harris County’s contract dollars, despite representing 28% of the available market. In response to the report, the Houston Chronicle Editorial Board published an op-ed titled Disparity for minority businesses in Harris County contracts must end.

In January 2019, Ellis proposed the creation of the Department of Economic Opportunity and Equity, which would address income inequality and other economic disparities in Harris County. Economic policies and initiatives would be focused on fair and equitable county contracting, workforce development, community business programs, community-based economic tax incentives, and workers’ rights.

In August 2019, in response to the economic devastation and inequality exacerbated by Hurricane Harvey in 2017, Ellis worked with representatives from Harris County Community Services Department to help develop Opportunity Builds Harris County, a policy with transformational rules that embed stronger worker protection and economic opportunity provisions into Harris County’s construction contracting practices. The policy requires county contractors to pay workers no less than $15/hour on county building projects, addressing Houston’s growing labor shortage for skilled construction workers and ensuring fair and safe practices and sustainable wages.

In March 2025, Commissioner Ellis made a motion to pass a new living wage policy of $21.65/hour for workers on county contracts and $20/hour for county employees. The policy was tethered to the MIT Living Wage calculator to adjust along with the cost of living, and passed 4-1.

Environmental Justice

In 2018, Ellis secured a unanimous decision by Commissioner’s Court to approve an election for a $2.5 billion flood bond program that would prioritize socially vulnerable communities for flood control projects. On August 26, 2018, county voters overwhelmingly approved the program with more than 85 percent support. The equity guidelines for the over 500 flood control projects have been nationally recognized for tackling racial inequity and climate change.

After the Exxon and ITC fires in March 2019, and the KMCO fire in April, Ellis and Commissioners Court approved an $11.6 million investment toward purchasing new equipment and hiring 61 employees for the fire marshal’s office, pollution control, and public health departments to significantly boost Harris County’s ability to respond to environmental emergencies.

In December 2019, Ellis voted to approve County Attorney Vince Ryan’s request to consider legal action against Union Pacific, a multi-billion-dollar transportation company for mismanagement of contamination from a rail yard in northeast Houston that has in recent years moved beneath an estimated 110 properties in the Kashmere Gardens and Fifth Ward, both historically Black neighborhoods.

On December 18, 2019, in response to pressure, chemical firms offered a $1 million grant that was approved to come to Harris County for air quality monitors and training, growing the emergency response infrastructure in the heart of the nation’s petrochemical industry.

In early 2025, Commissioners Court approved the Climate Justice Plan – led by Ellis – that creates a comprehensive strategy to tackle climate change while ensuring that all residents benefit from a sustainable future. The plan, with key input from community leaders, sets goals across five key areas – ecology, infrastructure, economy, community and culture – to ensure a thriving, sustainable future for all Harris County residents. Central to the plan’s approach is climate justice, which seeks to address the disproportionate impacts of climate change on vulnerable communities by building creative solutions with residents and community organizations.

== Business career and personal ==
Ellis is a senior advisor in the Public Policy and Regulation practice group for Dentons, the world's largest law firm. Ellis previously served as an advisor to the Mexican government during the ratification of the NAFTA Treaty. He also advised the buy side on the $1.3 billion privatization of Telkom South Africa, at the time the largest privatization in Africa.

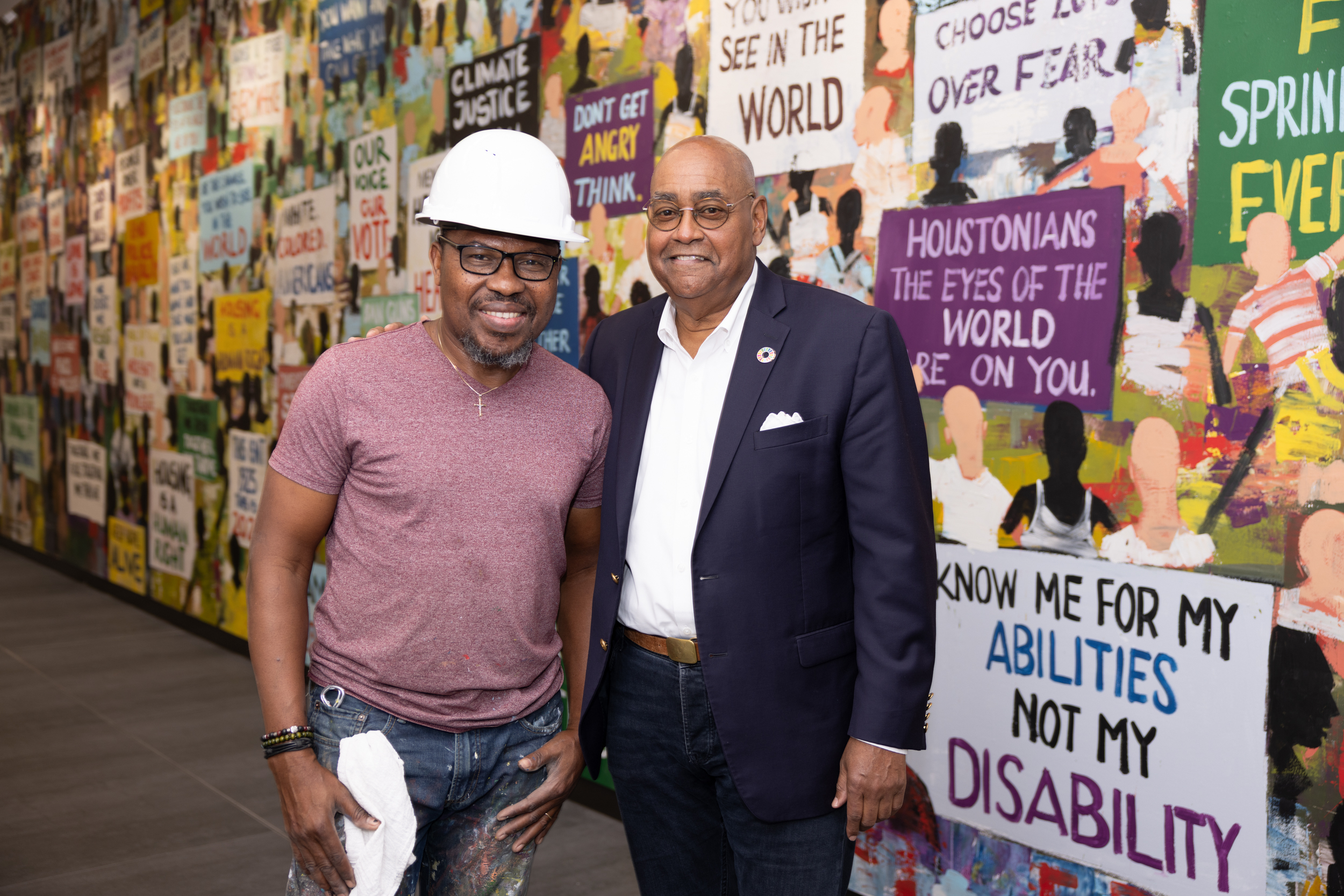
Ellis, right, and artist Bimbo Adenugba stand in front of mural titled “Protest.”

Ellis serves on the LBJ Foundation board of trustees, the University of Texas School of Law Foundation board of trustees, and the Council on Foreign Relations. Ellis is the former chair of the Innocence Project board of directors. He also formerly served as co-chair of the National Conference of State Legislatures (NCSL) Task Force on International Relations and on NCSL's Executive Committee. In addition, he previously served on the board of the National Commission on Energy Policy, the U.S. Secretary of Energy Advisory Board, the Center for Policy Alternatives, and the Commission to Engage African Americans on Energy, Climate Change, and the Environment.

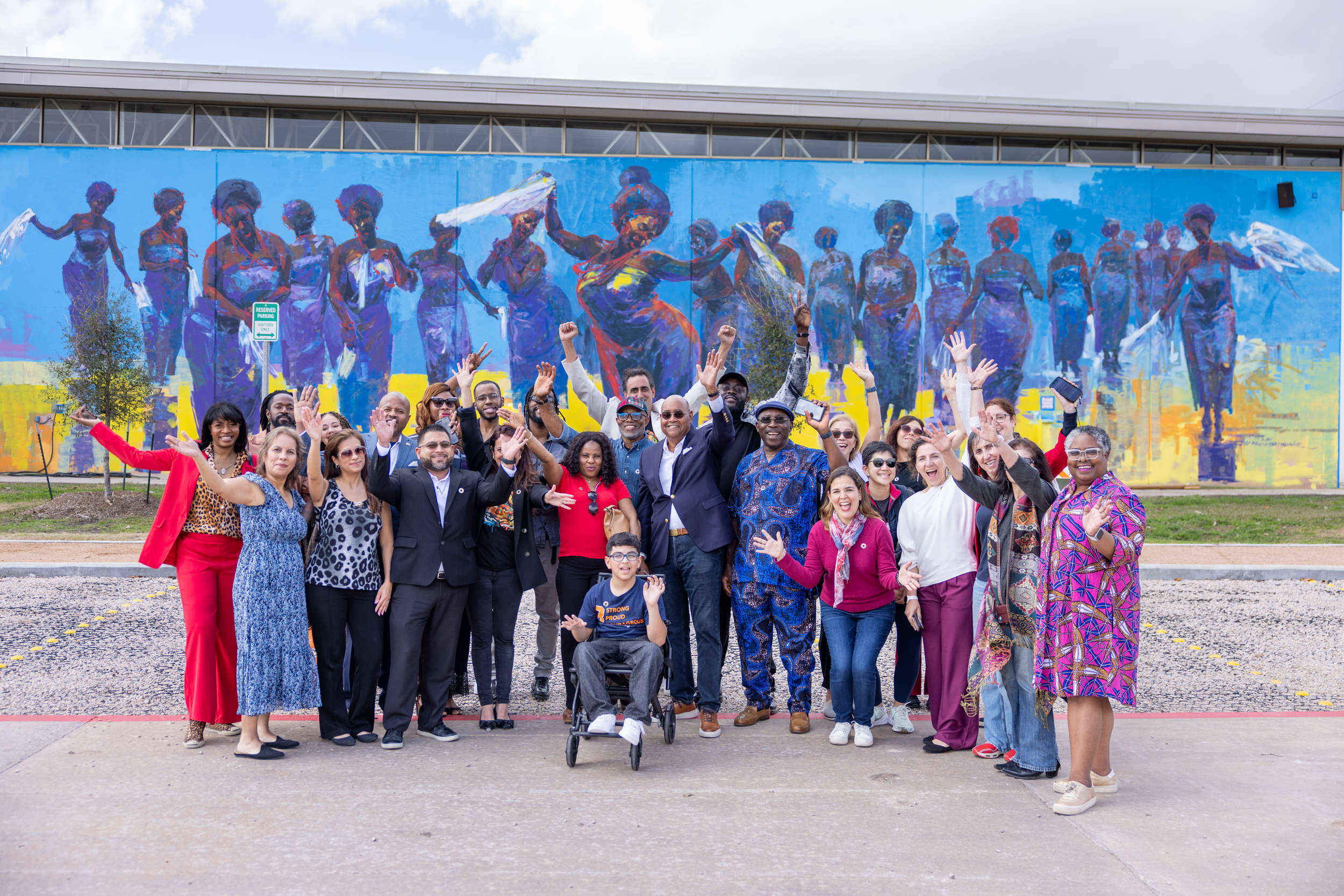
During a tour of murals, Ellis and art community wave in front of “The Stream Crosses that Path” mural on the Harris County Aquatics Center.

Ellis helped to negotiate bringing Lucy (Australopithecus), a natural history exhibit, to Houston. Ellis led a delegation to the National Museum in Addis Ababa, Ethiopia, to bring Lucy's bones to the United States and the Houston Museum of Natural Science. Lucy, who lived 3.2 million years ago and is perhaps man's earliest known ancestor, was discovered in 1974.

Ellis is an avid cyclist who has authored "Complete Streets" legislation to improve safety for motorists and cyclists, and has sponsored or taken part in numerous cycling events, like the MS 150, in Texas and across the country. Ellis has sponsored the annual National Conference of State Legislatures Bipartisan Bike Ride each year since 2005.

Ellis is an art collector and has a collection of African art.

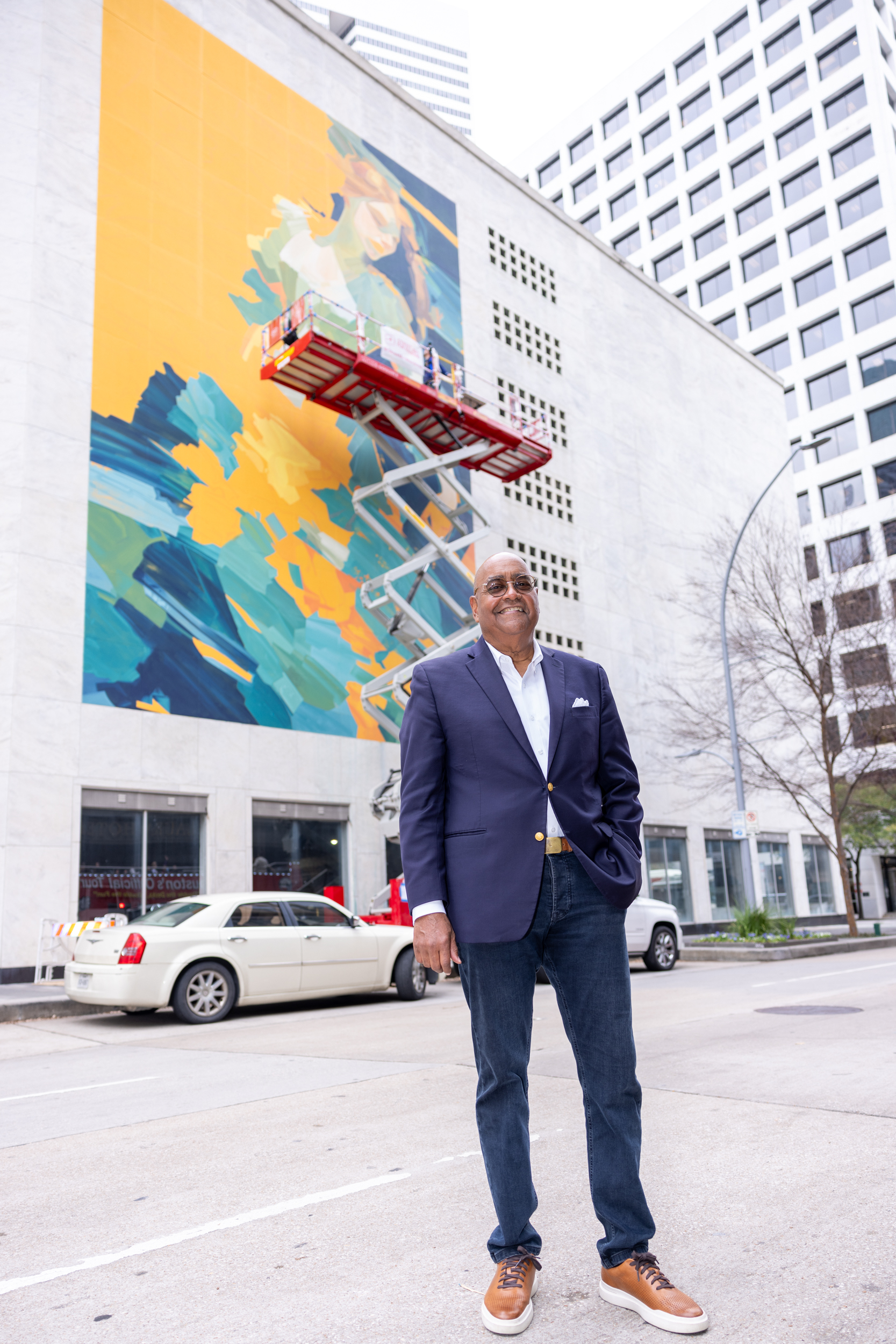
Ellis poses with the downtown mural “60%” in the background.

Since becoming a Commissioner, Ellis has arranged to have murals painted on public spaces, including one in April 2022 to honor Supreme Court Justice Ketanji Brown Jackson, the first African American woman appointed to the nation’s highest court. In 2018, artists painted the “Sacred Struggles/Vibrant Justice Mural” that pays tribute to eight African-American civil rights leaders in Houston.

Ellis also has led efforts to install statues in two public parks. In 2022, he helped place a George Floyd statue – donated to the county by Dannette K. Davis and her Kay Davis in the Community Foundation – in Tom Bass Park in Houston. The artwork, called a “Conversation with George,” was unveiled on the second anniversary of the murder of Houston native Floyd, who was killed by a Minneapolis police officer. In partnership with the City of Houston, its Parks and Recreation Department and Houston First, Ellis in April 2020 led the installation of a statue of the late Congressman Mickey Leland in Houston’s Hermann Park.

Precinct One also is designing the Harris County Remembrance Project Park, which will be on a city block in downtown Houston. The park is envisioned as a public destination for community reflection, education, organizing and activism around issues of social, criminal, economic and racial justice. In addition, the park will have four historical markers – donated to Harris County by the Equal Justice Initiative – documenting lynching victims in the County between 1877 and 1950.

Ellis was listed as a bundler for President Barack Obama's re-election campaign in 2012.

== Controversies ==
In 1995, Ellis was featured in the PBS documentary "Vote for Me." He was filmed on the floor of the Senate during the 74th Legislative Session in 1995 with a live microphone, unknown to his fellow Senators. Ellis apologized to his colleagues for the breach of protocol. The same filmmakers released a short documentary three decades later called "Inside Man: Rodney Ellis and the Art of the Possible" detailing further footage of Ellis from his time at Harris County Commissioners Court, mainly focusing on the fight over bail reform.

In 2001, following George W. Bush's election to the presidency and Lieutenant Governor Rick Perry's promotion to governor, Ellis – by virtue of serving as President Pro Tempore – became the official presiding officer of the Texas Senate. He drew fire from Texas media for ensuring the Senate vote to replace Perry was done with a secret ballot and without a record vote.

In 2013, Ellis assisted Senator Wendy Davis with a back brace during Davis' 11-hour filibuster of Senate Bill 5, a bill to add and update abortion regulations in Texas. Ellis' assistance resulted in a point of order being called against Davis, effectively the second warning that her filibuster could be forced to end. Even though Davis' filibuster was eventually cut off, Senate Bill 5 failed to pass later that night, as parliamentary inquiries from senators and cheering from the Senate gallery caused the session to run past the midnight deadline. Later, in remarks to the National Press Club, Davis said that "Texas women know that Senator Ellis has our back."

In 2013, Ellis wrote to Houston Independent School District Superintendent Terry Grier and requested the district begin the process of changing the Lamar High School mascot, which at the time was the Redskins. Despite some opposition, the HISD Board of Trustees later voted unanimously to adopt a new district policy that banned the use of offensive mascot names.

Ellis sought and was given permission by the Harris County Commissioner's Court to display fourteen pieces of African art beginning in 2018. His precinct later accepted more than 1,400 pieces of art, few of which have ever been shown publicly. The art has been stored free of charge at a county facility. The agreement to store the art was between Harris County and African Art Global, a business where Ellis's sister serves as a board member. The federal government and the Harris County District Attorney's Office have investigated the storage of this art. Ellis is one of five Commissioners Court members who votes on the annual budget of the Harris County District Attorney's Office, one of the agencies initially investigating him over the incident. The ownership of the art is unclear, although the agreement regarding the storage of the art is an issue which "keeps [him] up at night" according to an e-mail Ellis sent to his staff. Ellis has paid $213,000 of his campaign funds for legal services to provide advice regarding this issue, including to notable criminal defense lawyer Rusty Hardin. On February 28, 2020, a local news station published surveillance video it had obtained from the storage facility depicting Ellis providing a tour of the African art to parties unknown.

A Harris County grand jury cleared Ellis in the District Attorney's investigation.

== Election history ==
Election history of Ellis from 1992.

=== 2012 ===
Texas general election, 2012: Senate District 13
Party	Candidate	Votes	%	±%
Democratic	Rodney Ellis (Incumbent)	181,866	100.00	
Majority		181,866	100.00	
Turnout		181,866		
Democratic hold				

=== 2010 ===
Texas general election, 2010: Senate District 13
Party	Candidate	Votes	%	±%
Democratic	Rodney Ellis (Incumbent)	113,155	78.17	
Republican	Michael Mauldin	31,596	21.82	
Majority		81,559	56.35	
Turnout		144,751		
Democratic hold				

=== 2006 ===
Texas general election, 2006: Senate District 13
Party	Candidate	Votes	%	±%
Democratic	Rodney Ellis (Incumbent)	90,148	100.00	
Majority		90,148	100.00	
Turnout		90,148		
Democratic hold				

=== 2002 ===
Texas general election, 2002: Senate District 13
Party	Candidate	Votes	%	±%
Democratic	Rodney Ellis (Incumbent)	107,897	100.00	
Majority		107,897	100.00	
Turnout		107,897		
Democratic hold				

=== 1998 ===
Texas general election, 1998: Senate District 13
Party	Candidate	Votes	%	±%
Democratic	Rodney Ellis (Incumbent)	86,631	100.00	
Majority		86,631	100.00	
Turnout		86,631		
Democratic hold				

=== 1994 ===
Texas general election, 1994: Senate District 13
Party	Candidate	Votes	%	±%
Democratic	Rodney Ellis (Incumbent)	89,832	100.00	
Majority		89,832	100.00	
Turnout		89,832		
Democratic hold				

=== 1992 ===
Texas general election, 1992: Senate District 13
Party	Candidate	Votes	%	±%
Democratic	Rodney Ellis (Incumbent)	135,262	91.41	
Libertarian	John Persakis	12,713	8.59	
Majority		122,549	82.82	
Turnout		147,975		
Democratic hold				

== See also ==
Topics

- History of the African-Americans in Houston
- Texas Legislature
- Harris County

People

- Mickey Leland
- Curtis Graves
- Barbara Jordan
- El Franco Lee
- Sheila Jackson Lee
- Sylvester Turner
- Sylvia Garcia
- Al Green
- Erica Lee Carter
- Borris Miles
- Harold Dutton
- Norris Wright Cuney

Texas Senate
Preceded by Craig A. Washington	Texas State Senator from District 13 (Houston); 1989-2017	Succeeded by Borris Miles
