= Al Edwards (politician) =

American politician (1937–2020)

Member of the Texas House of Representatives from the 146th district
- In office January 13, 2009 – January 11, 2011
- Preceded by: Borris Miles
- Succeeded by: Borris Miles
- In office January 9, 1979 – January 9, 2007
- Preceded by: District established
- Succeeded by: Borris Miles

Personal details
- Born: Albert Ely Edwards; March 19, 1937 Houston, Texas, U.S.
- Died: April 29, 2020 (aged 83) Houston, Texas, U.S.
- Resting place: Texas State Cemetery
- Party: Democratic
- Children: 8
- Education: Texas Southern University (BA)
- Profession: Realtor and Mortgage Broker

Albert Ely Edwards (March 19, 1937 – April 29, 2020) was an American politician who served in the Texas Legislature, representing District 146. He is best known as the principal proponent of the Juneteenth Texas state holiday, approved in 2007, which in 2021 became a federal holiday. Edwards served on three of the most influential Committees, including the Rules and Resolutions Committee, the Budget and Oversight Committee, and the Appropriations Committee.

== Biography ==
=== Life ===
Edwards was a native Houstonian. He was the sixth child out of the sixteen children of Reverend E. L. Edwards Sr. and Josephine Radford Edwards.

Edwards graduated from Wheatley High School in Houston. Edwards was a member of Alpha Phi Alpha fraternity.

He received a bachelor's degree from Texas Southern University in 1966 and a Certificate in Corrective Therapy at Tuskegee Institute in Alabama. He became a realtor and mortgage broker.

=== Career ===
He was involved in the Civil Rights Movement, where he participated in peaceful marches and demonstrations throughout the United States of America with Dr. Martin Luther King Jr., Reverend Jesse Jackson, Mr. Carl Stocks, Reverend William (Bill) Lawson, and others.

Edwards was a thirteen-term elected member of the Texas House of Representatives, serving in that capacity from 1978 to 2007. In 1979, he authored and sponsored House Bill 1016, making June 19 ("Juneteenth") a state-paid holiday in Texas. He founded Juneteenth, U.S.A., in 1979 along with Al Edwards Real Estate and Mortgage Company.

=== 1980s ===
He served as a member of the board of Push International Trade Bureau of Chicago, Illinois from 1983 to 1989. Al Edwards served as the State Chairman for Reverend Jesse Jackson's campaign for President of the United States in both 1984 and 1988.

In 1986, he founded "Operation Justus", a community-based organization that serves as a referral service for persons with social problems and concerns. In 1987, he was arrested in Houston and went to jail for peacefully demonstrating against apartheid in South Africa. Others demonstrating on the national level included Reverend Jesse Jackson, Dick Gregory, Aretha Franklin, Harry Belafonte along with many others. In 1989, he traveled to Mozambique, Angola, and South Africa on a peace-seeking mission.

=== 1990s ===
Representative Edwards served as Chairman of the Texas Legislative Black Caucus from 1991 to 1997. Al Edwards was called to ministry in April 1993. Revered Al Edwards is a member of Progressive New Hope Church.

During the Clinton administration, Al Edwards was often invited to the White House as the guest of Bill and Hillary Clinton. In May 1994, he was inducted into the Hall of Fame of the African American Biographic Association in Atlanta, Georgia. Al Edwards was elected Chairman of the Democratic National Committee Black Caucus and held that position for six years. He was Vice-Chairman for ten years.

Edwards received his Doctorate of Divinity from World Bible Christian University in San Antonio. In 1999, Edwards was appointed Chairman of the Texas Emancipation Juneteenth Cultural and Historical Commission by Governor George W. Bush.

=== 2004 ===
On January 15, 2004, Al Edwards helped to lead a successful march of over 5000 people in Waller County in order for the students of Prairie View A & M University to be able to vote. As a senior member of the State Legislature, Al Edwards served on three of the most influential Committees. He was the Chairman of the Rules and Resolutions Committee, Chairman of Budget and Oversight of the Ways and Means Committee and a member of the Appropriations Committee.

=== Awards ===
He was inducted into "Who's Who in America" in 1989 and "Who's Who of Global Decision Makers" in 2006. In 1983, he received an honorary doctoral degree from the University of Belize. Edwards is memorialized with a statute near Ashton Villa in Galveston, depicting him holding up a copy of the Juneteenth legislation.

== Death ==
Edwards died from natural causes on April 29, 2020, at age 83.

Texas House of Representatives
Preceded by New district	Member of the Texas House of Representatives from District 146 (Houston); 1979–2007	Succeeded by Borris Miles
Preceded by Borris Miles	Member of the Texas House of Representatives from District 146 (Houston); 2009-2011	Succeeded by Borris Miles
