= Shawn Thierry =

Texas politician

Shawn Nicole Thierry

Member of the Texas House of Representatives from the 146th district
- In office January 10, 2017 – January 14, 2025
- Preceded by: Borris Miles
- Succeeded by: Lauren Ashley Simmons

Personal details
- Born: Shawn Nicole Thierry; August 6, 1969 (age 57)
- Party: Republican
- Other political affiliations: Democratic (until 2024)
- Education: Howard University (BA); Texas Southern University (JD)
- Occupation: Attorney
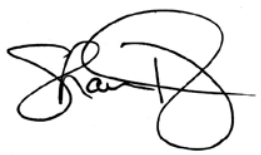
- Signature

Shawn Nicole Thierry (born August 6, 1969) is an American politician from the state of Texas. She was appointed Judge of the 515th Civil District Court in Harris County on August 25, 2026 by Governor Greg Abbott. Thierry is a former member of Texas House of Representatives. She won the November 2016 general election and was sworn into office on January 10, 2017.

== Early life ==
Shawn Thierry was raised in Southwest Houston. She graduated from Howard University and Thurgood Marshall School of Law at Texas Southern University.

== Positions ==
In April 2023, Thierry voted with Republicans in favor of HB 900, to ban books from public schools deemed "sexually explicit". The bill was heavily criticized by LGBT advocates for including books containing reference to LGBT topics in its definition of sexually explicit.

In May of that year, Thierry broke ranks with her party to vote in favor of a bill to ban gender affirming care for trans minors. She has also voted in favor of bans on trans women from women's sports.

On March 5, 2024, Thierry came in second in the primary elections to her challenger, Lauren Ashley Simmons, a progressive queer union organizer who ran in opposition to Thierry's anti-LGBT votes and activism, and was forced into a run-off. On August 30, 2024, Thierry officially announced that she would be leaving the Democratic Party and joining the Republican Party. (Note: “The Democratic Party has veered so far left, so deep into the progressive abyss, that it now champions policies I cannot, in good conscience, support—policies like promoting sex changes for vulnerable children and dismantling Title IX protections for women in sports,” Thierry wrote in her statement. “That’s why I am leaving the left and joining the party of family, faith, and freedom. I now stand with colleagues, friends, neighbors, women, and mothers in the Republican Party.”) Thierry further discussed her decision to leave the Democratic Party at the 2024 national summit for the right-wing group Moms for Liberty.

== Personal life ==
Thierry is a practicing Catholic.
