= Lauren Ashley Simmons =

American politician

Member of the Texas House of Representatives from the 146th district
- Incumbent
- Assumed office January 14, 2025
- Preceded by: Shawn Thierry

Personal details
- Born: Houston, Texas, U.S.
- Party: Democratic
- Children: 2
- Education: University of Texas at Austin
- Website: Campaign website

Lauren Ashley Simmons is an American politician. She represents the 146th district of the Texas House of Representatives.

== Early life and career ==
Simmons was born in Houston, Texas, and grew up in the Third Ward. She graduated from Jack Yates High School and the University of Texas at Austin. She has a son and a daughter, the first of which she had during her freshman year of college, with her husband. She identities as queer.

After graduating, Simmons worked as a resident services director and as a union organizer at the Texas State Employees Union. In 2023, a video of her criticizing the Houston Independent School District takeover went viral, with one post garnering nearly 9 million views.

== Texas House of Representatives ==
In the 2024 election, Simmons challenged incumbent Shawn Thierry for the 146th district of the Texas House of Representatives. In May of that year, Thierry broke ranks with her party to vote in favor of a bill to ban gender affirming care for minors and also voted in favor of banning transgender people from participating in gendered sports.

On March 5, Simmons advanced to a runoff election against Thierry with 49% of the vote, just under the 50% threshold to win the Democratic primary election outright. On May 28, Simmons defeated Thierry with 65% of the vote. After losing the primary election, Thierry joined the Republican Party.

In November 2024, she defeated Republican Lance York, winning 77.7% of the vote. She succeeded Shawn Thierry. She assumed office on January 14, 2025.
