= El Franco Lee =

American politician

Member of the Texas House of Representatives from the 142nd district 88th district (1979–1983)
- In office January 9, 1979 – January 8, 1985
- Preceded by: Mickey Leland
- Succeeded by: Harold Dutton Jr.

Harris County Commissioner from Precinct 1
- In office January 1, 1985 – January 3, 2016
- Preceded by: Tom Bass
- Succeeded by: Rodney Ellis

Personal details
- Born: January 30, 1949 Houston, Texas, US
- Died: January 3, 2016 (aged 66) Houston, Texas, US
- Party: Democratic
- Parent(s): Selma Lee; Robert Lee
- Education: Texas Southern University (BS)

El Franco Lee (January 30, 1949 – January 3, 2016) was an American politician who served as a Harris County commissioner from 1985 to his death in 2016. Before becoming a county commissioner, he served as a member of the Texas House of Representatives from 1979 to 1985.

== Early life ==
Lee was born in Houston, Texas, on January 30, 1949, to Robert and Selma Lee. He had one younger sibling and three older siblings. After graduating from Phillis Wheatley High School, Lee earned a Bachelor of Science from Texas Southern University.

== Career ==
=== Texas House of Representatives ===
Lee ran for office in the 88th district of the Texas House of Representatives in 1978. The 88th district was being vacated by Mickey Leland, under whom Lee served as an aide for six years. Lee, who was endorsed by the United Steelworkers, was initially disqualified from the ballot due to having an insufficient number of verifiable signatures for his nominating petition. After a ruling by district judge Jim Wallace, Lee was allowed to remain on the ballot after paying a $400 fee. He defeated Norma Watson in the Democratic primary after a runoff election. Lee, who was running unopposed, won the general election in November.

During his tenure as a state legislator, Lee served on the Business and Industry, Intergovernmental Affairs, Ways and Means, Environmental Affairs, and Elections committees.

=== Harris County Commissioner ===
In January 1984, Lee announced he would not seek re-election to the Texas House and instead seek the position of Harris County Commissioner, Precinct 1. Lee's primary challengers included Carl Walker Jr. and Sylvester Turner. Lee defeated Walker after a runoff election. Because the Republican Republican Party did not field any candidates for the position, Lee's victory in the runoff ensured him of the post. As a result, Lee became the first African-American member of Harris County's governing body.

Lee served in this position for over 30 years until his death in 2016.

== Death ==
Lee died of a myocardial infarction on January 3, 2016, at Lyndon B. Johnson General Hospital, in Houston, Texas.

== Legacy ==
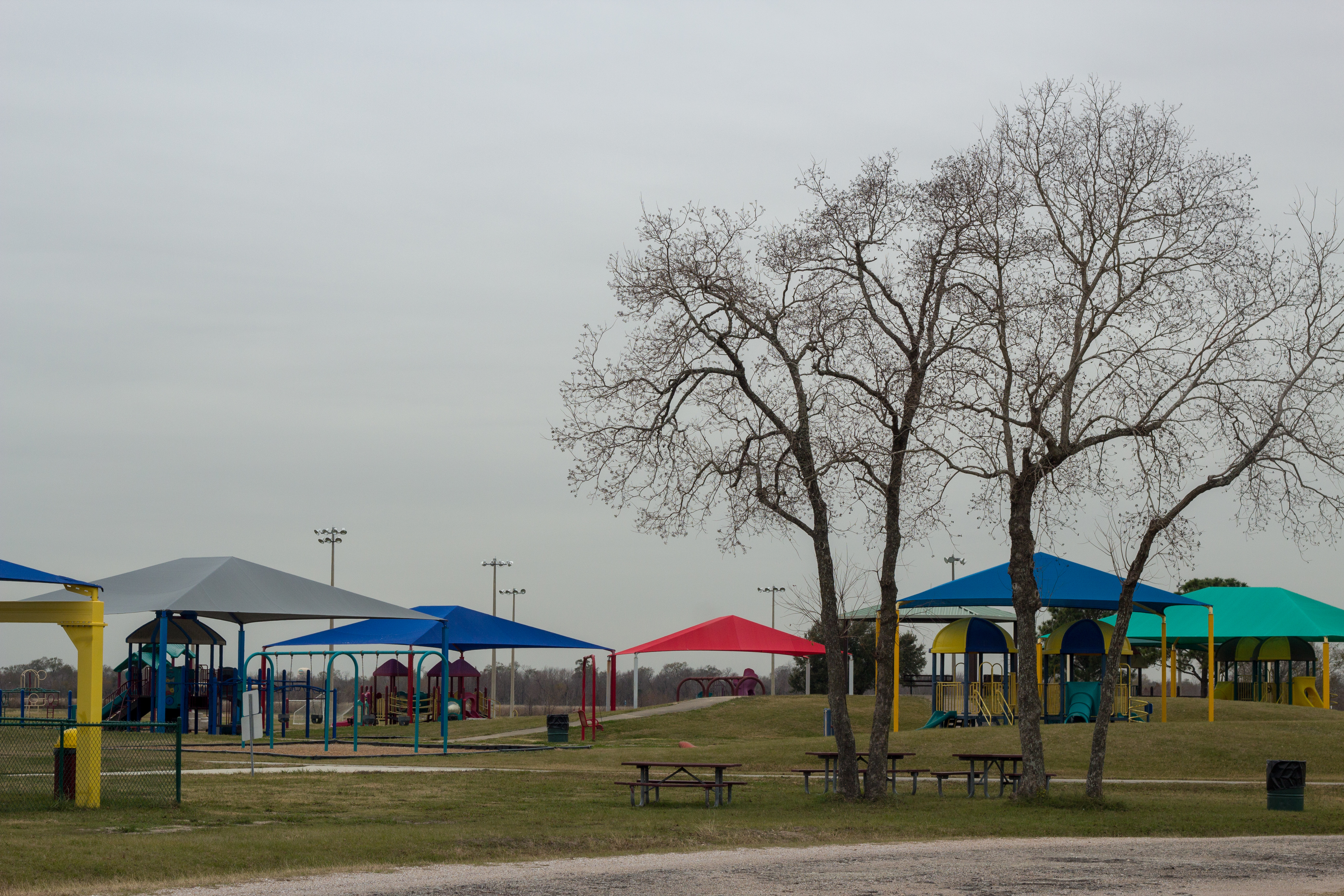
El Franco Lee Park

In 1990, the local communities around Hall Road Park in Houston successfully petitioned to rename the park as El Franco Lee Park. In May 2009, the Harris County Hospital District opened the El Franco Lee Health Center in Alief, Houston.
