= Isaac Heffron House =

Historic house in Texas, United States

- U.S. National Historic Landmark District – Contributing property
- U.S. Historic district – Contributing property
- Recorded Texas Historic Landmark
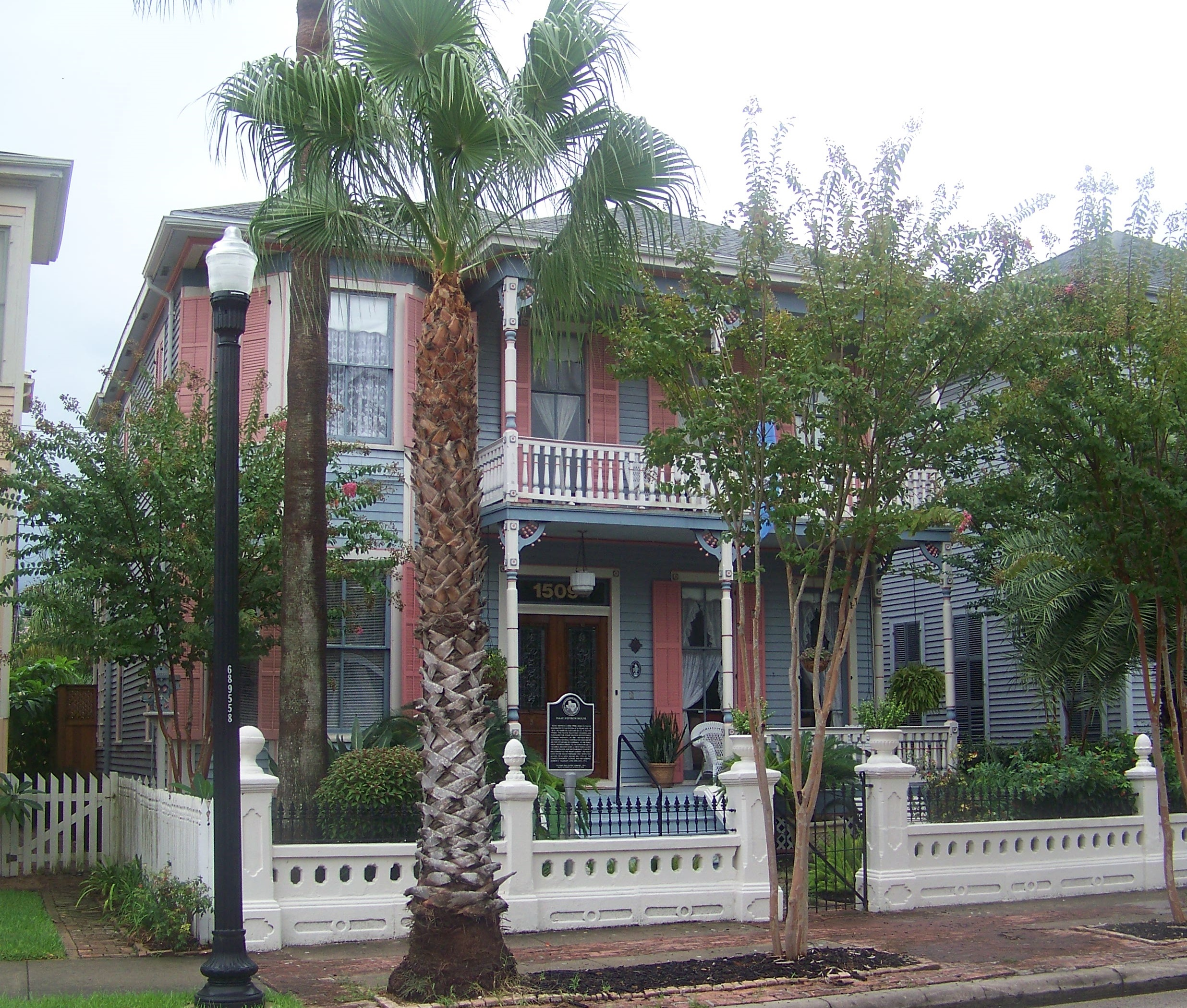
- Isaac Heffron House in 2016
- Location: 1509 Postoffice St., Galveston, Texas
- Coordinates: 29°18′24″N 94°47′5″W
- Built: 1890
- Architect: Isaac Heffron
- Architectural style: Victorian
- Part of: East End Historic District (ID75001979)
- RTHL No.: 7479

Significant dates
- Designated NHLDCP: May 11, 1976
- Designated CP: May 30, 1975
- Designated RTHL: 2016

The Isaac Heffron House is a two-story building located at 1509 Postoffice Street (Avenue E) in the East End Historic District of Galveston, Texas. The house was built by Isaac Heffron, a prominent Galveston contractor in the Victorian period and during the city's recovery from the 1900 Galveston Hurricane. Later, the house was the residence of T.J. Holbrook, a Texas state senator from 1922 to 1939.

== Isaac Heffron ==
Isaac Heffron was born in Cardiff, Wales in either 1853 or 1858. He immigrated to the United States in 1860 and settled in Galveston, Texas. Beginning in 1881, he worked as a stevedore for the firm Munn, Fry, and Company. He remained with the firm until 1885, by which point it had been renamed Fry and Heffron. As Heffron's career developed, he completed increasingly large construction projects and received substantial contracts from the City of Galveston, including one for the construction of a railroad, including a trestle bridge, connecting Galveston to La Porte, Texas.

=== Galveston Sewer Company ===
During the middle of the nineteenth century, Galveston suffered a public health crisis. The city lacked an organized waste management system. The worst problem was human waste.

In 1886, Heffron founded the Galveston Sewer Company and was awarded a contract from the City of Galveston to begin laying pipes for a system of surface water and waste drainage. For a fee, Heffron offered homeowners the ability to connect their private homes to the central cement pipes, which deposited runoff into the Galveston Bay. In the following years, he continued to expand the sewage system, initially focusing on the portion of town bound by 14th Street, Broadway, 27th Street, and the bay. By 1899, the system included eight miles of cement pipes and connected 430 properties. In 1892, during the midst of the project, the city awarded Heffron's company a 50-year franchise to install sewage pipes in the city.

Between 1896 and 1901, Heffron and city officials engaged in acrimonious negotiations regarding the future of the sewage system. A growing portion of the city's population believed that the public, rather than a private company, should maintain ownership. Heffron believed that his contract guaranteed that the city could only take control of the system by purchasing it. Some city leaders, including city attorney Waverley Smith, believed that the original agreement was unlawful and, therefore, the city had no obligations to the Galveston Sewer Company. The debate persisted for several years, complicated by the devastation brought by the 1900 Galveston Hurricane. Heffron shrewdly used newspaper publicity in effort to sway public opinion toward his perspective. Finally, in 1901, a court ordered Galveston Mayor Walter C. Jones to pay the full purchase price of $93,600.

== 1509 Postoffice ==
In October 1881, Heffron acquired the property at 1509 Postoffice Street in Galveston from David Fahey. Some time prior to 1871, Josephine and William Casseady had built a one-story house on the lot. Heffron and his wife Clotilde resided in the house until 1890, when they demolished it and constructed a two-story house in the same footprint. They may have incorporated portions of the earlier building into the 1890 house.

=== Architectural description ===
The 1890 Isaac Heffron House is a two-story, four-bay, urban Victorian house with turned columns, a two-story tri-partite bay window, and a central entrance. Compared to other noted architectural examples of the period in the East End district, the house has more restrained details. Its placement on a constrained urban lot between other houses limited Heffron's ability to employ other common Victorian elements, such as turrets and wrap-around porches.

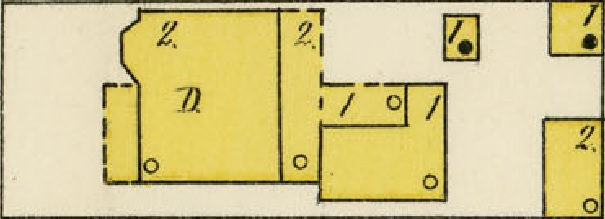
The footprint of the 1890 Isaac Heffron House as seen in the 1899 Sanborn fire insurance map of Galveston.

The tall two-over-two windows of the first story are characteristic late nineteenth century features and they are indicative of the use of the porch as an extended living space in the subtropical climate. The rear, southern porch illustrated in the 1899 Sanborn map is typical of north-facing houses that sought to capture incoming breezes from the Gulf of Mexico. While there is no evidence that Heffron hired an architect for the project, the lot bears signs of his personal influence as a contractor, most notably in the concrete balustrade at the front of the lot.

=== Heffron Residence ===
The Heffron family lived in the house through the 1890s while Isaac's career continued to advance and his wealth increased. In 1899, he commissioned architect Charles W. Bulger to design a new house for the family at 511 17th Street. The family relocated in 1901. Heffron died in his office in 1928.

== Thomas J. Holbrook ==
After relocating to 17th Street, Heffron retained ownership of the house at 1509 Postoffice and used it as a rental property for several years before transferring the deed to Andrew C. Falligant, the husband of Heffron's daughter Clotilde. The Falligant family lived in the house until October 1913, when they sold it to Thomas J. Holbrook. Born 1878 in Salado, Texas, Holbrook worked as a credit manager for the firm Mistrot Bros. in Galveston between 1907 and 1919. After a two-year stay in Dallas, he returned to Galveston in 1921 and was elected state senator in 1922. Over the course of his tenure in office from 1922 to 1939, he was a leader in efforts to construct a 1930 causeway connecting Galveston Island to the mainland and to add a psychiatric hospital to the campus of the University of Texas Medical Branch. The house at 1509 Post Office was his Galveston home throughout his term.

== Later Owners and Preservation Efforts ==
In 1940, Holbrook sold the house to Edmund Cordray, a pharmacist who had operated his business at the corner of Postoffice and 15th Streets since 1918. Cordray used the house as a rental property until his death in 1965. The house had several different owners through the 1970s and 1980s. In 1990, new owners undertook a substantial rehabilitation project, which included the replacement of damaged historic porch spindles with materials salvaged from the nearby Joseph L. Darragh House during its 1992 demolition, the removal of paint from interior woodwork, and the replacement of damaged cypress siding with matching materials from architectural salvage sources. The current owners, who purchased the property in 2010, successfully applied to have the house listed as a Recorded Texas Historic Landmark in 2016.

== See also ==
- List of National Historic Landmarks in Texas
- National Register of Historic Places listings in Galveston County, Texas
- Recorded Texas Historic Landmarks in Galveston County
