= East End Historic District (Galveston, Texas) =

Historic district in Texas, United States

- U.S. National Register of Historic Places
- U.S. National Historic Landmark District
- U.S. Historic district
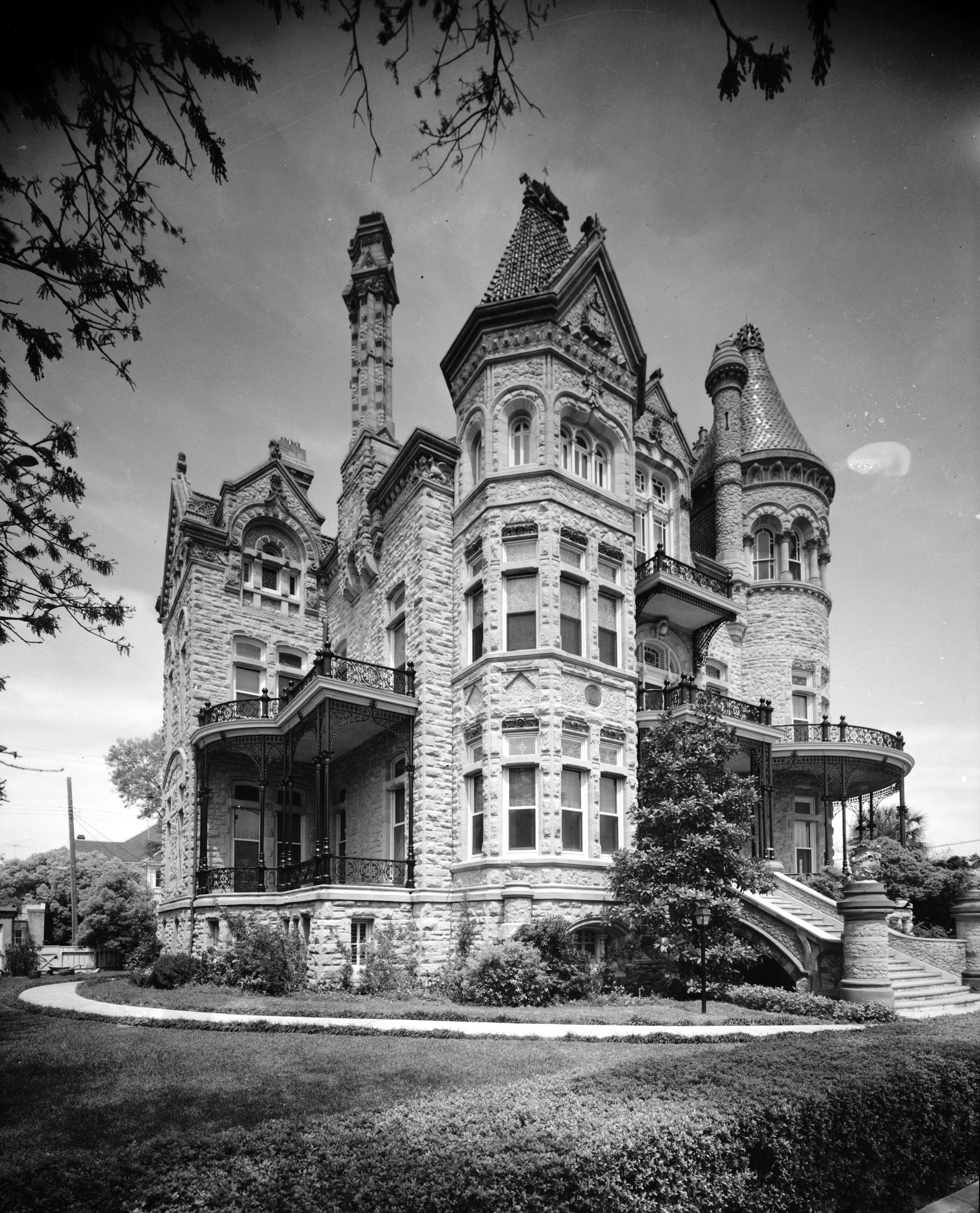
- Col. Walter Gresham House, HABS photo

- Location within Texas Location within the United States
- Location: Irregular pattern including both sides of Broadway and Market Sts., Galveston, Texas
- Coordinates: 29°18′16″N 94°46′58″W
- Area: 150 acres (61 ha)
- Built: 1840
- Architect: Nicholas J. Clayton, Anton Korn, others
- Architectural style: Greek Revival, Late Victorian
- NRHP reference No.: 75001979

Significant dates
- Designated NHLD: May 11, 1976
- Designated HD: May 30, 1975

The East End Historic District encompasses a large 19th-century residential area in eastern Galveston, Texas. The area is roughly bounded by Broadway to the south, Market St to the north, 19th St to the west, and 9th street to the east. The area has one of the best-preserved and largest concentrations of 19th-century residential architecture in Texas. It was developed mainly at a time when Galveston was the state's preeminent port. The historic district, designated locally in 1970, was placed on the National Register of Historic Places in 1975 and declared a National Historic Landmark in 1976.

== Description and history ==
Galveston's history as a port city began in 1830, when Mexico established a custom house on Galveston Island. After the Texas Republic was established in 1836, Galveston Island was developed as the republic's principal port. Its street network was platted in 1838, and by 1850 it was the second largest port on the Gulf Coast (after New Orleans). This early growth included the construction of a number of Greek Revival houses in the eastern end of the island, some of which still stand. The city experienced significant growth after the American Civil War, but its growth was curtailed by the growth of Houston as a competing port, and then by the 1900 Galveston hurricane, which devastated the city and effectively ended its significance as a major port.

The eastern end of Galveston Island became its preeminent residential district, where the city's civic and business leaders built their houses. Wilbur Cherry, an early newspaper published in the city, built a house on Cherry Street in 1852 which is one of the district's oldest. The grandest mansion in the area is the so-called Bishop's Palace, completed in 1893 for politician and lawyer Walter Gresham. Most of the district's 550-plus buildings are residences that show Victorian architectural styles, although a number of relatively unaltered examples of the Greek Revival survive from its early days. The East End was protected as a local historic district in 1970. Historically, The East End was a hub of the Black community and institutions. Several important churches and historical landmarks are located here.

Significant and representative properties, some of which are individually listed on the National Register of Historic Places (NRHP) or as Recorded Texas Historic Landmarks (RTHL), include:

- Bishop's Palace (NRHP #70000746, RTHL #139), 1402 Broadway St.
- George Washington Grover House (RTHL #7479), 1520 Market St.
- Isaac Heffron House (RTHL #18528), 1509 Postoffice St.

Nicholas J. Clayton, Anton Korn and other architects designed buildings in the district.

== See also ==
- List of National Historic Landmarks in Texas
- National Register of Historic Places listings in Galveston County, Texas
- Recorded Texas Historic Landmarks in Galveston County
