= Harold Dutton Jr. =

Texas politician (born 1945)

Member of the Texas House of Representatives from the 142nd district
- Incumbent
- Assumed office January 8, 1985
- Preceded by: El Franco Lee

Personal details
- Born: February 17, 1945 (age 81)
- Party: Democratic
- Education: Texas Southern University; Thurgood Marshall School of Law
- Occupation: Lawyer
- Website: Office website

Harold Vernon Dutton Jr. (born February 17, 1945) is a Democratic member of the Texas House of Representatives representing District 142. He was first elected in 1984 and is the third longest-serving member of the Texas House of Representatives.

== Legislation ==
In 2015 an amendment written by Dutton to House Bill 1842 gave the Texas Education Agency the power to take over failing school districts. The agency used that authority in 2023 to take over the Houston Independent School District, of whose failings Dutton has been a longtime critic. Dutton has continued to support the Houston Independent School District takeover.

In May 2021, Dutton supported a bill that would restrict the ability of transgender children to participate in sports aligning with their gender identity. Members of his party called it an act of retaliation, as an unrelated education bill supported by Dutton was killed on the House floor the night before he came out in support of the transgender bill.

In May 2023, Dutton broke ranks with his party to vote in favor of a bill to ban gender affirming care for trans minors. He would later vote Present Not Voting on the impeachment of Ken Paxton.

== Personal life ==
Dutton is Catholic, a member of Our Mother of Mercy Catholic Church in Freedmen’s Town.

Four of Dutton's known children are sons who were borne by his ex-wife, Phyllis Faykus-Dutton. Faykus-Dutton was divorced from him in 1995 but did not get child support payments from him on a regular or sufficient basis; in 2007, she tried to have him sent to prison over this issue. She was unable to get him sent to prison, but was awarded nearly $16,000 in child support back payments as well as $8,000 for her attorney's fees.
