= Ashton Villa =

Historic home in Galveston, Texas, USA

- U.S. National Register of Historic Places
- Recorded Texas Historic Landmark
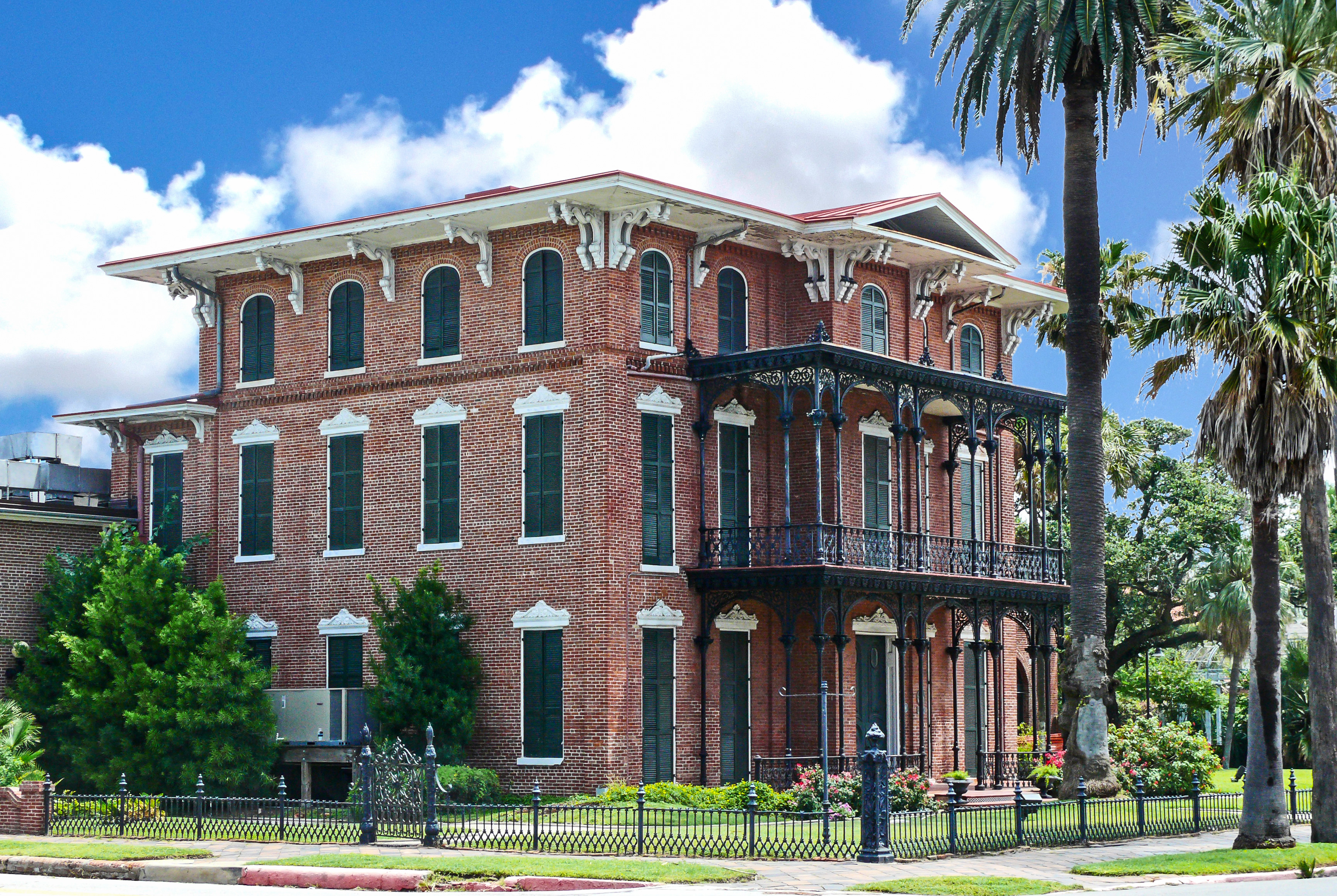
- Ashton Villa in 2012

- Location within Texas Location within the United States
- Interactive map showing the location of Ashton Villa
- Location: 2328 Broadway St., Galveston, Texas
- Coordinates: 29°17′59″N 94°47′33″W
- Area: 0.5 acres (0.20 ha)
- Built: 1858
- Architect: James Moreau Brown
- Architectural style: Victorian, Italianate
- Website: 1859 Ashton Villa
- NRHP reference No.: 69000204
- RTHL No.: 9924

Significant dates
- Added to NRHP: October 28, 1969
- Designated RTHL: 1967

Ashton Villa is a fully restored, historic home located on the corner of 24th and Broadway in Galveston, Texas, United States. Constructed in 1859, it was one of the first brick structures in Texas built by slaves.

== History ==
On January 7, 1859, Colonel James Moreau Brown, a prominent hardware merchant and banker, purchased four lots at the corner of 24th and Broadway in Galveston, on which to build a home. Referencing architectural pattern books current at the time, he modified several plans to design his future home. Using slave labor and European craftsmen, Brown proceeded to build one of the first brick structures in Texas.

The three-story house was built in Victorian Italianate style, with deep eaves, long windows and ornate verandas that were topped by lintels made of cast iron. The brick walls were made thirteen inches thick, to help protect against humidity and add strength to the structure. The interior of the home was laid out and designed around a central hall floor plan. Brown's wife, Rebecca Ashton, named the home in honor of one of her ancestors, Lt. Isaac Ashton, a hero in the U.S. Revolutionary War.

=== Civil War ===
When the American Civil War began in 1861, the home became the headquarters for the Confederate Army and served in that capacity for the entire war, except for a brief period in the fall of 1862. In the fall of 1862, Galveston was surrendered to the Union Army, which made Ashton Villa their headquarters. The Union's occupation was short lived, however, as Galveston was re-taken by the Confederates during the Battle of Galveston in January 1863.

==== End of the War ====
Despite the Confederacy's official surrender on April 9, 1865, the news was slow to spread in the far reaches of Confederate states, such as Texas and over a month from Lee's official surrender, the Battle of Palmito Ranch was fought on May 12 and 13, 1865. The fighting occurred on the banks of the Rio Grande east of Brownsville, Texas on the Texas-Mexico border. It took approximately another two weeks for Confederate Lieutenant General Simon B. Buckner to surrender his command of the Trans-Mississippi Department (which included Texas) to Union Major General Peter J. Osterhaus on May 26, 1865.

On Monday, June 19, 1865, Union Major General Gordon Granger and 2,000 federal troops arrived in Galveston, Texas, to take possession of the department of Texas and enforce the emancipation of its slaves. It is reported that Granger's men marched through Galveston reading General Order No. 3 first at Union Army Headquarters at the Osterman Building (formerly at the location of Strand Street and 22nd Street, since demolished), the 1861 Custom House and courthouse before marching to the Negro Church on Broadway, since renamed Reedy Chapel-AME Church. The order informed all Texans that, in accordance with a Proclamation from the Executive of the United States, all slaves were free.

The people of Texas are informed that, in accordance with a proclamation from the Executive of the United States, all slaves are free. This involves an absolute equality of personal rights and rights of property between former masters and slaves, and the connection heretofore existing between them becomes that between employer and hired labor. The freedmen are advised to remain quietly at their present homes and work for wages. They are informed that they will not be allowed to collect at military posts and that they will not be supported in idleness either there or elsewhere.

Although many claims have been made to Ashton Villa's central role in the original 1865 pronouncement, no extant historical evidence supports such assertions. On June 21, 2014, the Galveston Historical Foundation and Texas Historical Commission erected a Juneteenth plaque where the Osterman Building once stood signifying the location of Major General Granger's Union Headquarters and subsequent issuance of General Order No. 3. On June 19, 2006, a statue of Al Edwards, named "Unknown Legislator" was dedicated on the grounds of Ashton Villa during the annual prayer breakfast and celebration begun by Edwards in 1979, and hosted annually on the grounds of Ashton Villa every Juneteenth. The 9-foot tall statue of the Democratic State Representative from Houston, originally intended for the state capitol grounds in Austin, Texas is depicted holding up the piece of 1979 legislation making Juneteenth a paid Texas State holiday. The proclamatory pose of the statue evokes the very proclamation the holiday is meant to honor. Edwards' annual prayer breakfast and celebration, first held in 1979, take place every Juneteenth at Ashton Villa and include a reading of the 1862 Emancipation Proclamation and 1865 General Order No. 3 (with a local historian portraying Major General Granger addressing the crowd from the home's balcony). Despite Edwards' death from natural causes on April 29, 2020, the prayer breakfast and memorial celebration at Ashton Villa continued with the late legislator's son, Jason Edwards, speaking in his place.

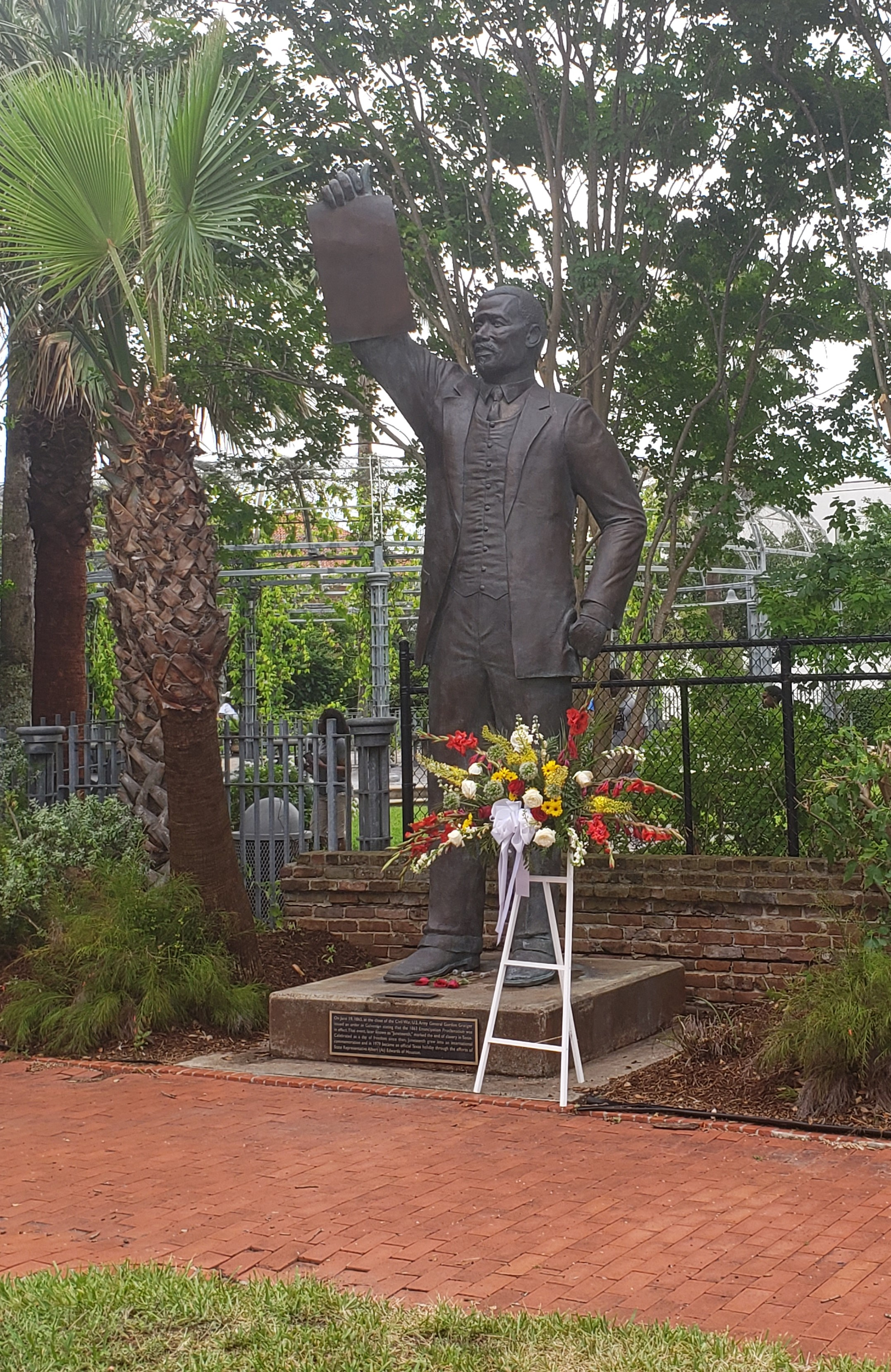
Al Edwards Statue

==== Juneteenth ====
June 19 has since become known as Juneteenth, a portmanteau of the words June and nineteenth.

Former slaves in Galveston rejoiced in the streets with jubilant celebrations. Juneteenth celebrations began in Texas the following year. Across many parts of Texas, freed people pooled their funds to purchase land specifically for their communities' increasingly large Juneteenth gatherings — including Houston's Emancipation Park, Mexia's Booker T. Washington Park, and Emancipation Park in Austin.

=== 1900 storm ===
Brown died in 1895, just five years before the 1900 hurricane devastated Galveston. However the house, with its thick brick walls, managed to withstand the storm's winds and infamous storm surge, while serving as shelter to Brown's widow and children. In the storm's aftermath and grade raising of the city, its basement was filled in with sand, and the surrounding grounds were topped with two feet of soil.

=== Recent ===
The home was sold in 1927 to the El Mina Shrine masonic order. Making very little change to the building, the house served as their business offices and meeting hall until 1970, at which point it was put up for sale. Under the threat of demolition, the Galveston Historical Foundation raised $125,000 (~$776,870 in 2024) to purchase Ashton Villa. With additional funding from local foundations and the government, the process of restoring and refurnishing the historic house began. Much of the original furniture and art was able to be retrieved. On July 25, 1974, the Galveston Historical Foundation opened the property to the public to serve as a House Museum, visitors center, and a place for special functions.

The first floor was submerged under more than 18 inches of water in 2008 during Hurricane Ike and was recently restored. The Villa is no longer open for public tours, but the first floor is available for private bookings.

Ashton Villa is listed on the National Register of Historic Places and is a Recorded Texas Historic Landmark.

== See also ==
- National Register of Historic Places listings in Galveston County, Texas
- Recorded Texas Historic Landmarks in Galveston County
