= Texas's 146th House of Representatives district =

American legislative district

Texas's 146th State House of Representatives district
Representative
| Lauren Ashley Simmons; D–Houston |
- Demographics: 16.4% White; 45.7% Black; 29.6% Hispanic; 8.8% Asian
- Population (2020) • Voting age: 192,277; 146,202

The 146th district of the Texas House of Representatives contains parts of Houston. The current representative is Lauren Ashley Simmons who won over the incumbent Shawn Thierry in the November 2024 general election.

== Members ==
- Shawn Thierry
- Lauren Ashley Simmons
