= Myra Crownover =

American politician (born 1947)

Majority Leader of the Texas House of Representatives
- Acting
- In office December 2012 – January 15, 2013
- Preceded by: Larry Taylor
- Succeeded by: Brandon Creighton

Member of the Texas House of Representatives from the 64th district
- In office May 10, 2000 – January 9, 2017
- Preceded by: Ronny Crownover
- Succeeded by: Lynn Stucky

Personal details
- Born: April 26, 1947 (age 79) Colorado City, Texas, U.S.
- Party: Republican
- Spouse: Ronny Crownover
- Children: 4
- Education: Southern Methodist University (BS); Texas A&M University (MS)

Myra Ellen Robinson Crownover (born April 26, 1947) is a businesswoman and politician from Lake Dallas in Denton County, north of the city of Dallas. Originally elected in 2000 as a Republican member of the Texas House of Representatives for District 64, she retired after declining to seek re-election in 2016. Under the state's 2012 redistricting process, her district was located completely in Denton County, including much or parts of Denton, Lake Dallas, Corinth, and Hickory Creek.

Crownover holds a Bachelor of Science degree from Southern Methodist University and a Master of Science from Texas A&M University at College Station, both in professional education. She was elected to the Texas House in 2000 to succeed her late husband, Representative Ronny Crownover.

== Elections ==
When Crownover's husband, a Denton veterinarian, died of leukemia after the 2000 primaries, his wife took his place on the general election ballot and ran unopposed. Since that time, Crownover was reelected six times and prevailed against major party opposition in the general election three times.

== Issues ==
=== Education ===
==== K-12 ====
During the Eighty-second Texas Legislature, Crownover served on the Appropriations Committee of the Texas House. The committee approved HB 1, which eventually passed through the Republican-dominated Texas House and Senate. The budget bill reduced funding for K-12 education by $4 billion for the 2011–12 and 2012–13 school years. Crownover spoke on the floor of the Texas House in favor of the budget with cuts, saying "I think this is the right thing for Texas, and I will be voting aye." In 2012, Crownover updated her campaign website to include the statement "we also were able to increase state funding for public schools by $1.6 billion even in the face of the worst recession in decades." Both PolitiFact.com and The Lewisville Texan Journal, an online publication in Lewisville, Texas, found Crownover's statement false, with Politifact Texas rating the statement "Pants on Fire". By March 22, the claim had been removed from her website.

==== Higher ====
The University of North Texas, Texas Woman's University, and North Central Texas College are all located in House District 64, which Crownover represented. After the November 2006 general election, she stated:

We have taken care of public school finance for right now, and I'm hoping this will be the higher education session. The state is growing rapidly, and we have great universities that needed to be funded.

— Myra Crownover, North Texas Daily, November 9, 2006

At the time, she said that she planned on Texas having a $5 to $10 billion surplus for the next year. After the 2008 election, Crownover reiterated her support for the right to higher education. In 2009, Crownover supported the increased athletics fee by authoring HB2024, which authorized the higher student fees at UNT to pay for Apogee Stadium. This was similar to when she created a bill to increase the athletics fee at Texas Woman's University up to $125 per semester. In 2011, she strongly advocated for HB 1, which cut funding for higher education in Texas by $1 billion.

=== Energy and the environment ===
With numerous investments in natural gas and oil production, Crownover earns dividends from Devon Energy, a natural gas production company based in Oklahoma City, Apache Corporation, and various other energy companies. Despite this, Crownover has served on the Committee for Energy Resources since 2005 and currently serves as the Vice Chair of the Energy Resources Committee in the Texas House of Representatives. On her time on committee in 2007, she has attempted to increase the tax credits for gas wells. In 2009, she authored House Bill 2259 that required oil and gas drilling companies to clean up the surface of the land associated with inactive wells. In 2011, Crownover coauthored House Bill 3328, which required natural gas drilling operators engaged in hydraulic fracturing to disclose the chemicals used in the fracking process; however, operators are only required to report the information to the immediate landowners, and the bill includes measures to protect industry trade secrets to avoid disclosure. She has also filed legislation requiring that pipelines use public right-of-way instead of private property and legislation strengthening the requirement that oil and gas companies disclose the well logs used by the Railroad Commission to protect Texas natural resources.

=== Health care ===
Representative Crownover attempted to pass a smoking ban in the Texas House of Representatives in 2007 and in 2011, but both times the measure failed in the Texas Senate. In 2005, Representative Crownover authored House Bill 790, which increased the number of genetic disorders newborns are screened for in Texas to 29. According to a news release from Crownover's office, since enactment of the legislation, more than 500 Texas newborns have been diagnosed and treated for disorders that, undetected, could have caused significant health problems or even death. In 2005, the March of Dimes named her "Advocate of the Year" for her work on newborn screening. Representative Crownover was also awarded the "Heart of Honor" award in 2008 and in 2012 by the American Heart Association.

In March 2012, an aide publicly left her position from Crownover's office and criticized the lawmaker for her position on women's health programs in Texas. Crownover also supported House Bill 15 during the 2011 session of the Texas Legislature, which requires a woman seeking to have an abortion in the state to first be subjected to a transvaginal ultrasound.

== Committees ==
- Appropriations
  - Appropriations Subcommittee on Article III (Public & Higher Education)
- Energy Resources (Vice Chair)

84th Session

- Public Health (Chair)
- Higher Education

== Retirement in 2016 ==
Crownover won re-nomination in the Republican primary election held on March 4, 2014. With a low turnout, she received 6,001 votes (54.9 percent) and defeated conservative challenger Read King, who polled 4,937 votes (45.1 percent).

Read King ran again ran for the seat in the Republican primary in 2016 but lost in a runoff to Lynn Stucky, like the late Ronny Crownover a veterinarian. He resides in Sanger, Texas, but is originally from Kansas. Stucky then prevailed over Democratic opposition in the November 8 general election and hence succeeded Crownover in the state House.

== Notes ==
Preceded by Ronny Crownover	Member of the Texas House of Representatives from District 64 (Lake Dallas); 2000–2017	Succeeded by Lynn Stucky
