= Lake Dallas, Texas =

- City
- Motto: Get hooked on Lake Dallas
- Location of Lake Dallas in Denton County, Texas
- Coordinates: 33°07′28″N 97°01′18″W
- Country: United States
- State: Texas
- County: Denton

Area
  - Total: 2.75 sq mi (7.12 km^{2})
  - Land: 2.43 sq mi (6.29 km^{2})
  - Water: 0.32 sq mi (0.83 km^{2})
- Elevation: 581 ft (177 m)

Population (2020)
  - Total: 7,708
  - Density: 3,321.3/sq mi (1,282.36/km^{2})
- Time zone: UTC-6 (Central (CST))
  - Summer (DST): UTC-5 (CDT)
- ZIP code: 75065
- Area code: 940
- FIPS code: 48-40516
- GNIS feature ID: 2411600
- Website: www.lakedallas.com

Lake Dallas is a city in Denton County, Texas, United States. As of the 2020 census, Lake Dallas had a population of 7,708. It is located in North Texas, northwest of the city of Dallas, on the shores of Lewisville Lake. The community's name derives from the original name of the lake. It is also one of the four communities in the Lake Cities.

== Geography ==
According to the United States Census Bureau, the city has a total area of 2.7 square miles (7.0 km^{2}), of which 2.4 square miles (6.2 km^{2}) is land and 0.31 square miles (0.8 km^{2}), or 11.03%, is water. The climate in this area is characterized by hot, humid summers and generally mild to cool winters. According to the Köppen Climate Classification system, Lake Dallas has a humid subtropical climate, abbreviated "Cfa" on climate maps.

== Demographics ==
Historical population
| Census | Pop. | Note | %± |
|---|---|---|---|
| 1970 | 1,431 | | — |
| 1980 | 3,177 | | 122.0% |
| 1990 | 3,656 | | 15.1% |
| 2000 | 6,166 | | 68.7% |
| 2010 | 7,105 | | 15.2% |
| 2020 | 7,708 | | 8.5% |
| 2023 (est.) | 7,917 | | 2.7% |
U.S. Decennial Census

=== 2020 census ===
As of the 2020 census, there were 7,708 people, 2,764 households, and 2,216 families residing in the city.

The median age was 34.9 years, with 26.3% of residents under the age of 18 and 10.1% of residents 65 years of age or older. For every 100 females there were 97.9 males, and for every 100 females age 18 and over there were 95.5 males age 18 and over.

99.7% of residents lived in urban areas, while 0.3% lived in rural areas.

There were 2,764 households in Lake Dallas, of which 39.3% had children under the age of 18 living in them. Of all households, 49.6% were married-couple households, 17.2% were households with a male householder and no spouse or partner present, and 25.5% were households with a female householder and no spouse or partner present. About 20.2% of all households were made up of individuals and 7.1% had someone living alone who was 65 years of age or older.

There were 2,923 housing units, of which 5.4% were vacant. The homeowner vacancy rate was 1.3% and the rental vacancy rate was 4.8%.

Racial composition as of the 2020 census
| Race | Number | Percent |
|---|---|---|
| White | 4,898 | 63.5% |
| Black or African American | 490 | 6.4% |
| American Indian and Alaska Native | 132 | 1.7% |
| Asian | 159 | 2.1% |
| Native Hawaiian and Other Pacific Islander | 7 | 0.1% |
| Some other race | 885 | 11.5% |
| Two or more races | 1,137 | 14.8% |
| Hispanic or Latino (of any race) | 2,320 | 30.1% |

== Education ==
The city of Lake Dallas is served by the Lake Dallas Independent School District. Lake Dallas is divided between the zones for Lake Dallas Elementary School and Shady Shores Elementary School. All residents are zoned to Lake Dallas Middle School and Lake Dallas High School.

The library for the area is the Lake Cities Library. The Lake Dallas Independent School District employs 570 people.

== Transportation ==
The North Texas Tollway Authority has completed a bridge in August 2009 linking Lake Dallas and Little Elm, Texas. The bridge connects Swisher Road in Lake Dallas with Eldorado Parkway in Little Elm. A bridge previously connected the two cities, but was removed in the 1950s when the United States Army Corps of Engineers expanded Lewisville Lake.

== Notable people ==
- Myra Crownover, former member of the Texas House of Representatives
- Dusty Dvoracek, football player and sports commentator
- Gordon McLendon, radio broadcaster
- Vitamin Smith, football player
- David Von Erich (1958-1984), professional wrestler
- Daryl Williams, football player
