= Lynn Stucky =

Texas state legislator

Lynn Dale Stucky

Member of the Texas House of Representatives from the 64th district
- In office January 10, 2017 – January 14, 2025
- Preceded by: Myra Crownover
- Succeeded by: Andy Hopper

President of the Sanger Independent School District Board of Trustees
- In office 2008–2012
- Succeeded by: Ken Scribner

Member of the Sanger Independent School District Board of Trustees
- In office 1997–2012

Personal details
- Born: February 20, 1958 (age 68) Kansas, U.S.
- Party: Republican
- Spouse: Lori Ann Stucky
- Children: Evan, Lyndi, and Malori Stucky
- Education: Kansas State University
- Occupation: Veterinarian, Legislator
- Website: Official website

Lynn Dale Stucky (born February 20, 1958) is an American veterinarian who was a Republican member of the Texas House of Representatives for the 64th district from 2017 to 2025. Earlier, Stucky served on the board of the Sanger Independent School District for fifteen years, four as the president.

Stucky was elected to the House in 2016, when the incumbent Republican in the district, Myra Crownover, of Lake Dallas, retired after sixteen years in the position. He was defeated by Republican Andy Hopper in 2024.

In 2017, Stucky joined state Senator Kirk Watson of Austin in filing legislation to refer the issue of feral hog proliferation to a university study to determine what impact that poisoning these animals, as proposed by Texas Agriculture Commissioner Sid Miller, would have on the land, agriculture, and hunters. Stucky and Watson want the research conducted before Miller can proceed with his proposal to exterminate the hogs, which have caused millions of dollars in damage to area landowners.

== Electoral history ==
In the general election held on November 6, 2018, Stucky won his second term with 36,195 votes (52.8 percent) to Democratic nominee Andrew Morris' 30,465 (44.5 percent). Libertarian Party nominee Nick Dietrich held the remaining 1,384 votes (2.7 percent).

Stucky narrowly defeated Andy Hopper in the Republican primary on March 1, 2022 by just 94 votes despite spending $474,806 to Hopper's $221,727.

In the Republican primary runoff on May 28, 2024, Stucky was defeated by Andy Hopper by 2,493 votes, both early and Election Day votes, with 8,951-6,458 vote totals.

Texas House of Representatives
Preceded by Myra Crownover	Member of the Texas House of Representatives from District 64 (Sanger); 2017 – present	Succeeded by Andy Hopper
