= Sanger High School =

Sanger High School may refer to:

- Sanger High School (California), located in Sanger, California
- Sanger High School (Texas), located in Sanger, Texas
