= James Franklin (quarterback) =

American gridiron football player (born 1991)

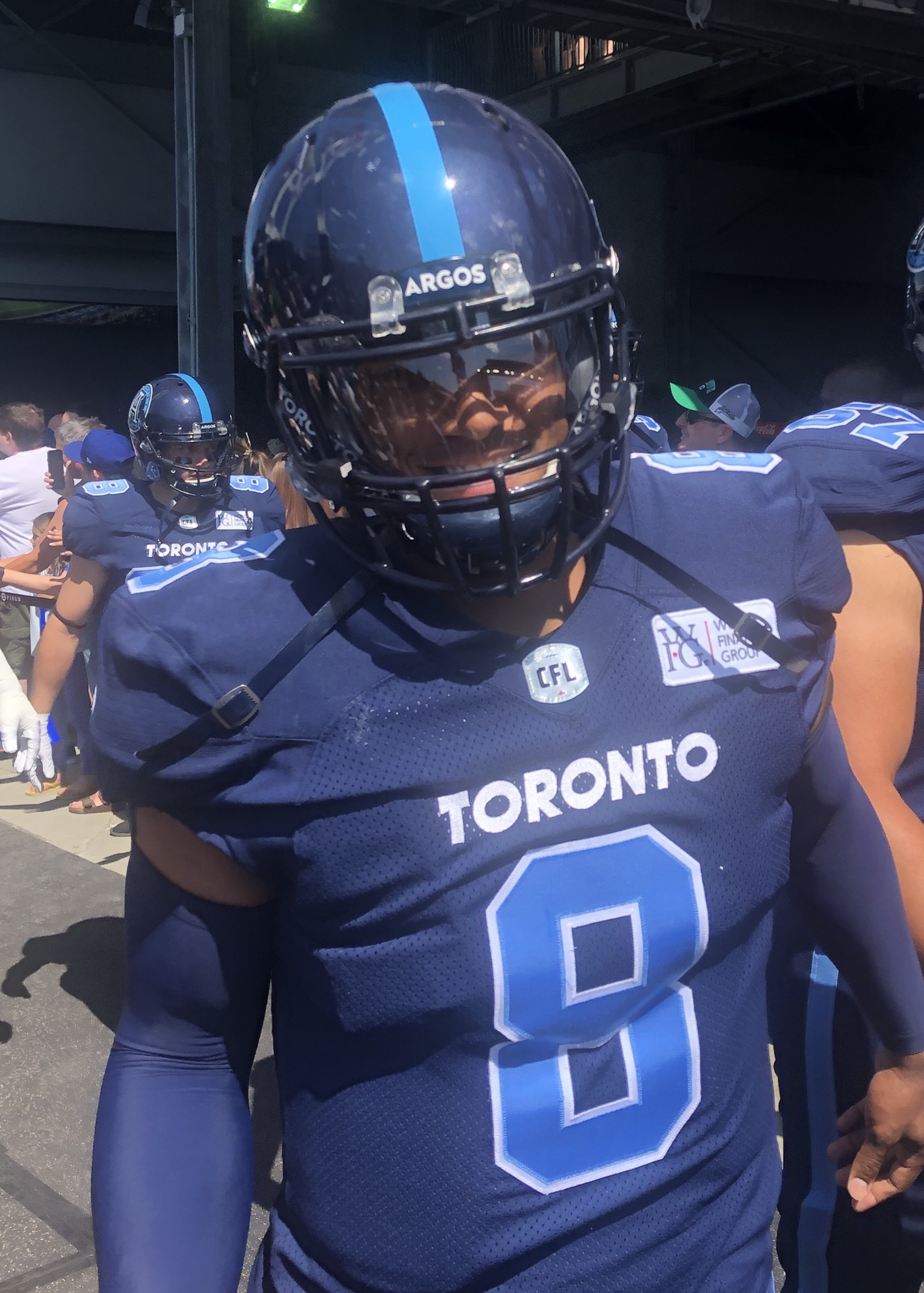
- Franklin with the Toronto Argonauts in 2019

No. 14, 2, 8
- Position: Quarterback

Personal information
- Born: July 23, 1991 (age 35); Oklahoma City, Oklahoma, U.S.
- Listed height: 6 ft 2 in (1.88 m)
- Listed weight: 235 lb (107 kg)

Career information
- High school: Lake Dallas (Corinth, Texas)
- College: Missouri (2010–2013)
- NFL draft: 2014: undrafted

Career history
- 2014: Detroit Lions*
- 2015–2017: Edmonton Eskimos
- 2018–2019: Toronto Argonauts
- 2020–2021: Saskatchewan Roughriders*
- * Offseason or practice squad member only

Awards and highlights
- Grey Cup champion (2015); CFL rushing touchdowns leader (2018)
- Stats at CFL.ca

James Franklin (born July 23, 1991) is an American former professional football quarterback. He played college football at Missouri. He was the Tigers' starting quarterback from 2011 to 2013. He was a member of the Detroit Lions, Edmonton Eskimos, Toronto Argonauts, and Saskatchewan Roughriders.

== Early life ==
Franklin attended Lake Dallas High School in Corinth, Texas.

He was rated the #4 Dual-Threat Quarterback in the country by Rivals.com.

College recruiting
| Name | Hometown | School | Height | Weight | 40^{‡} | Commit date |
|---|---|---|---|---|---|---|
| James Franklin; QB | Corinth, TX | Lake Dallas | 6 ft 2 in (1.88 m) | 218 lb (99 kg) | 4.6 | Mar 14, 2009 |
| James Franklin; QB | Recruit ratings: Scout: Rivals: (76) | | | | | |

== College career ==
As a freshman in 2010, Franklin was the backup to Blaine Gabbert. He played in 10 games, completing 11 of 14 passes for 106 yards with a touchdown and an interception. He also ran for 116 yards on 23 carries with two touchdowns. He became the starter in 2011 after Gabbert entered the 2011 NFL draft.

As a sophomore in 2011, Franklin started all 13 games for Missouri, leading them to an 8–5 record. He completed 63.3% of his passes for 2865 yards, 21 touchdowns, and 11 interceptions. He also rushed 217 times for 981 yards and 15 touchdowns. Franklin led Missouri to a number of comeback victories, erasing a 14-point deficit against the Texas A&M Aggies and the Texas Tech Red Raiders, and a 10-point deficit against the Kansas Jayhawks. Franklin also led Missouri to its first win over the Texas Longhorns since 1997.

Franklin was named MVP of the 2011 Independence Bowl after leading Missouri to a 41–24 victory over the North Carolina Tar Heels, accounting for 274 total yards of offense and 3 touchdowns.

On March 19, 2012, it was announced that Franklin would have surgery on his throwing shoulder but he was expected to recover in time for the start of the regular season. He returned for the start of the season, but battled injuries throughout the season, appearing in only nine games. He finished the season with 1,562 passing yards, 10 touchdowns and seven interceptions.

As a senior in 2013, Franklin appeared in 10 games, missing four due to injury. He finished the season with 2,429 passing yards, 19 touchdowns and 6 interceptions. In his final college game, he helped lead the Tigers to a victory in the 2014 Cotton Bowl.

== Professional career ==
=== Detroit Lions ===
Franklin went undrafted in the 2014 NFL draft. However, on May 10, 2014, the Detroit Lions signed Franklin to a rookie free-agent deal. On August 25, 2014, he was released.

=== Edmonton Eskimos ===
According to his Twitter account, Franklin signed in the Canadian Football League (CFL) with the Edmonton Eskimos on April 10, 2015. Franklin began the 2015 CFL season as the number 3 quarterback on the depth chart; behind Mike Reilly and Matt Nichols. In two preseason games, Franklin completed 26 of 40 pass attempts for 316 yards with 1 touchdown and 1 interception. In his next two seasons in Edmonton, Franklin would only sparingly see action as he continued to back-up Mike Reilly. In three seasons with the club, Franklin attempted 176 passes, completing 116 of them for 1,449 yards with 12 touchdowns and only one interception.

=== Toronto Argonauts ===
On December 12, 2017, Franklin was traded by the Eskimos (along with a 2018 third round pick) to the Toronto Argonauts in exchange for national offensive lineman Mason Woods. Franklin was a pending free agent and needed to be re-signed by the Argos prior to February 13, 2018; which the Argos accomplished on January 5, 2018, when they signed him to a two-year deal. Franklin was brought in by the Argos to be an understudy to veteran quarterback Ricky Ray for his final season, before taking the reins in 2019: However, Ray suffered a spinal injury in Week 2, ending his season (and possibly his career), accelerating the Argos timeline with Franklin making him the starting quarterback in Week 3. Nevertheless, after a poor performance in Week 7 Franklin was demoted to backup quarterback behind McLeod Bethel-Thompson. Bethel-Thompson won his first two starts, but was ultimately unable to lead the Argos to the playoffs, and with the team eliminated Franklin returned to the starting role in Week 18. Both quarterbacks finished with the same starting record of 2-6 as the Argos limped to a 4-14 last place finish. As a short yardage quarterback, Franklin tied a CFL record held by Doug Flutie of most rushing touchdowns in a season, with 14.

Franklin began the 2019 season as the Argos' starting quarterback, but suffered a hamstring injury in the team's Week 3 loss to the Roughriders and was subsequently placed on the six-game injured reserve list. He was announced as the team' starting quarterback again after Week 15 as the club fell to a record of 2-10. Franklin started the next two games for the Argos, but was unable to lead them to victory in either outing and was demoted to back-up quarterback behind McLeod Bethel-Thompson. The Argos re-signed McLeod Bethel-Thompson on February 4, 2020, and signed veteran quarterback Matt Nichols on February 7, 2020, and subsequently released Franklin later that same day.

=== Saskatchewan Roughriders ===
Franklin signed with the Saskatchewan Roughriders on February 11, 2020. He signed a one-year contract extension with the team on January 12, 2021. The team announced his retirement on April 9, 2021.

== Career statistics ==
| | | Passing | | | | | | | | | Rushing | | | | |
| Year | Team | GP | GS | Comp | Att | Pct | Yards | TD | Int | Rating | Att | Yards | Avg | Long | TD |
|---|---|---|---|---|---|---|---|---|---|---|---|---|---|---|---|
| 2015 | EDM | 17 | 2 | 84 | 133 | 63.2 | 973 | 6 | 1 | 97.1 | 16 | 140 | 8.8 | 33 | 1 |
| 2016 | EDM | 18 | 1 | 19 | 24 | 79.2 | 334 | 4 | 0 | 158.3 | 1 | 1 | 1.0 | 1 | 0 |
| 2017 | EDM | 18 | 0 | 13 | 19 | 68.4 | 142 | 2 | 0 | 125.3 | 1 | 4 | 4.0 | 4 | 0 |
| 2018 | TOR | 18 | 8 | 187 | 286 | 65.4 | 2,034 | 8 | 9 | 82.4 | 78 | 365 | 4.7 | 44 | 14 |
| 2019 | TOR | 9 | 4 | 75 | 111 | 67.6 | 822 | 3 | 6 | 75.7 | 18 | 83 | 4.6 | 12 | 2 |
| CFL totals | | 79 | 15 | 378 | 573 | 65.9 | 4,305 | 23 | 16 | 90.1 | 114 | 593 | 5.2 | 44 | 17 |
