= Kobee Minor =

American football player (born 2002)

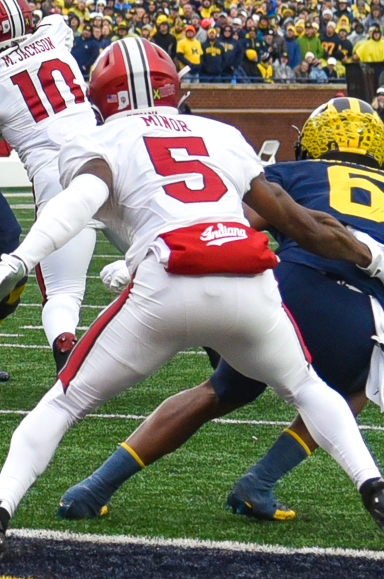
- Minor with the Indiana Hoosiers in 2023

Profile
- Position: Cornerback

Personal information
- Born: July 8, 2002 (age 24); Dallas, Texas, U.S.
- Listed height: 5 ft 11 in (1.80 m)
- Listed weight: 188 lb (85 kg)

Career information
- High school: Lake Dallas (Corinth, Texas)
- College: Texas Tech (2020–2022); Indiana (2023); Memphis (2024)
- NFL draft: 2025: 7th round, 257th overall pick

Career history
- New England Patriots (2025)

Career NFL statistics
- Total tackles: 1
- Stats at Pro Football Reference

Darrian Kobee Minor (born July 8, 2002) is an American professional football cornerback. He played college football for the Texas Tech Red Raiders, Indiana Hoosiers, and Memphis Tigers, and was selected by the Patriots as the last overall pick of the 2025 NFL draft.

== Early life ==
Minor was born on July 8 2002 in Dallas, Texas. He attended Lake Dallas High School in Corinth, Texas, and was rated a consensus three-star recruit. In high school, Minor earned the following accolades: 2018 junior season, 1st Team Safety, Texas 5A District 7, Division 2; 2019 senior season, All-Purpose MVP, Texas 5A District 7, Division 2. He committed to play college football at Texas Tech.

== College career ==
=== Texas Tech ===
Minor appeared in one game his true freshman year and redshirted. He played 10 games the next year in 2021, playing on defense and special teams. In 2022, he played in 12 games, missing only the Texas Bowl against Ole Miss.

=== Indiana ===
Minor transferred to play for the Indiana Hoosiers. In 2023, he notched 29 tackles and four pass deflections in nine starts. After the 2023 season, Minor once again entered his name into the NCAA transfer portal.

=== Memphis ===
Minor transferred to play for the Memphis Tigers. In 2024, he notched 38 tackles with seven being for a loss, two sacks, six pass deflections, and two forced fumbles in 11 games.

== Professional career ==
Pre-draft measurables
Height	Weight	Arm length	Hand span	Wingspan	40-yard dash	10-yard split	20-yard split	20-yard shuttle	Three-cone drill	Vertical jump	Broad jump	Bench press
5 ft 11 3/8 in (1.81 m)	188 lb (85 kg)	31 5/8 in (0.80 m)	10 in (0.25 m)	6 ft 4 1/2 in (1.94 m)	4.56 s	1.60 s	2.68 s	4.54 s	7.23 s	36.0 in (0.91 m)	10 ft 0 in (3.05 m)	9 reps
All values from Pro Day

=== New England Patriots ===
Minor was selected by the New England Patriots in the seventh round, with the 257th overall pick of the 2025 NFL draft. He was the final pick of the draft, making him 2025's Mr. Irrelevant. On August 26, 2025, he was released by the Patriots due to roster cuts and re-signed to the practice squad the following day. Minor was signed to the active roster on January 1, 2026.

On August 30, 2026 Minor was waived by the Patriots as a part of final roster cuts.

== Personal life ==
Minor is the youngest of eight siblings. His brother Darryl Minor Jr. is a linebacker for the Sul Ross State Lobos. His father, Darryl Minor Sr., played at Oregon State and for the Washington Commanders.
