= Mike Remmers =

American football player (born 1989)

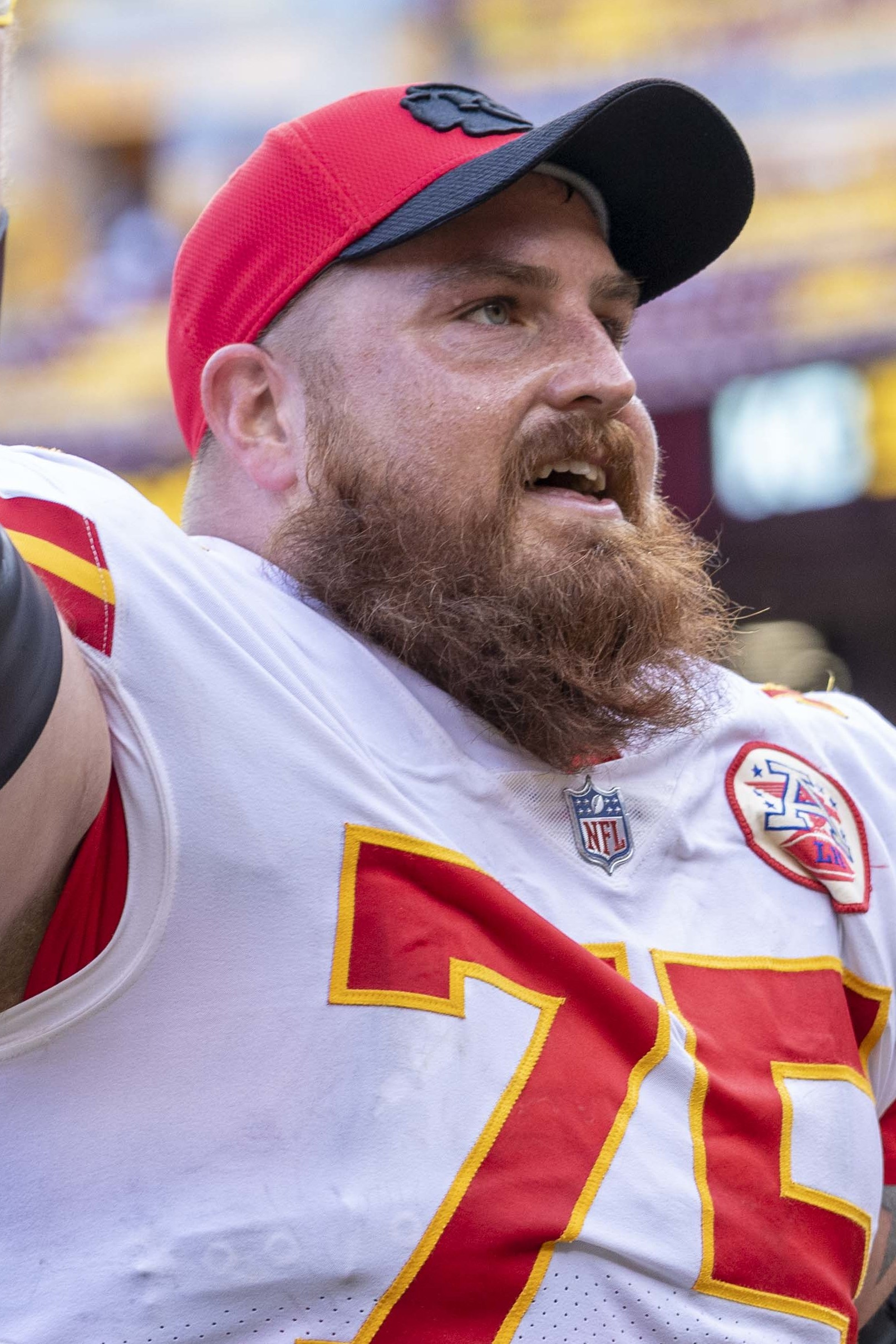
- Remmers with the Kansas City Chiefs in 2021

Profile
- Position: Offensive tackle

Personal information
- Born: April 11, 1989 (age 37); Portland, Oregon, U.S.
- Listed height: 6 ft 5 in (1.96 m)
- Listed weight: 308 lb (140 kg)

Career information
- High school: Jesuit (Beaverton, Oregon)
- College: Oregon State (2007–2011)
- NFL draft: 2012: undrafted

Career history
- Denver Broncos (2012)*; Tampa Bay Buccaneers (2012–2013)*; San Diego Chargers (2013); Minnesota Vikings (2013); St. Louis Rams (2014)*; Carolina Panthers (2014–2016); Minnesota Vikings (2017–2018); New York Giants (2019); Kansas City Chiefs (2020–2021); New York Jets (2022)
- * Offseason or practice squad member only

Career NFL statistics
- Games played: 104
- Games started: 91
- Stats at Pro Football Reference

Michael Remmers (born April 11, 1989) is an American former professional football player who was an offensive tackle in the National Football League (NFL). He played college football for the Oregon State Beavers, finishing his career with the sixth-most starts in school history. He signed as an undrafted free agent with the Denver Broncos in 2012 and played with six different franchises in his NFL career, and started in two Super Bowls.

== Early life ==
Remmers was born in Portland, Oregon. His father, Wally Remmers, played football at Oregon State University in the mid-1970s, and his older brother, Vic, played basketball for the Beavers from 2002 to 2006. He attended Jesuit High School in his native Portland, where he was a three-year letterwinner at left tackle and defensive end and earned second-team All-Metro honors at both positions as Jesuit won two state football titles during his varsity career. As a senior offensive lineman who stood at 6 ft 5 in (1.96 m) and weighed only 220 pounds (100 kg), Remmers did not get a single scholarship offer, however he qualified academically and was given the opportunity to be a preferred walk-on for OSU. Remmers also earned one letter in basketball at Jesuit.

== College career ==
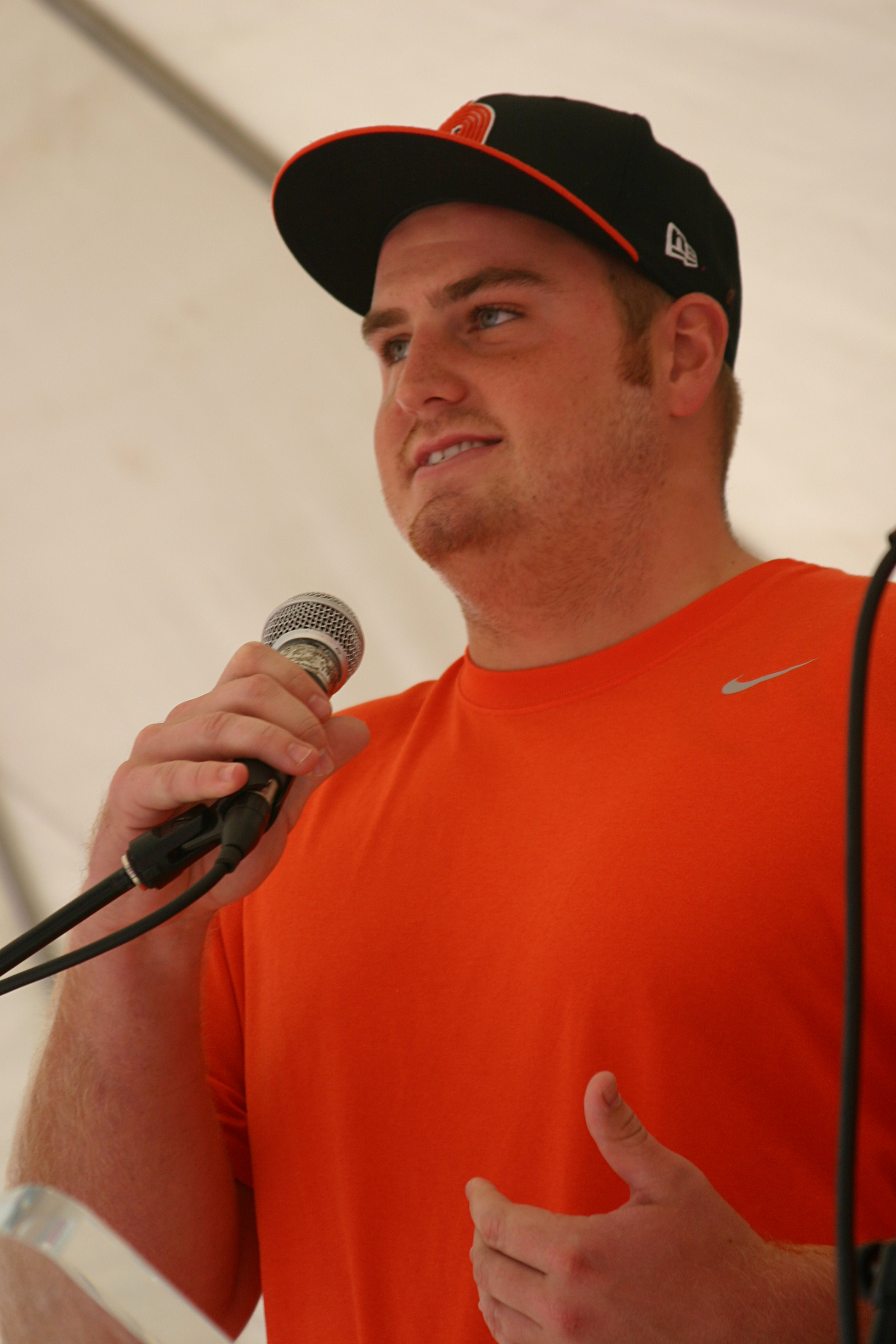
Remmers in 2011 at OSU

Remmers played for the Oregon State Beavers from 2007 to 2011. Remmers redshirted his freshman season in 2007 when the Beavers went 9–4, and when starting right tackle Tavita Thompson was ruled ineligible to begin the 2008 season, Remmers started the first seven games in his place, helping the Beavers rank second in the conference in total offense with an average of 407.1 yards per game. After the season, Oregon State gave Remmers a full scholarship. In 2009, his sophomore year, Remmers assembled himself in the starting line-up and provided protection for an OSU offense that led the conference in passing with an average of 270.8 yards per game. He was an All-Pac-12 Conference honorable mention in his junior year and was a finalist for the Burlsworth Trophy, which is given annually to the best player in the country who began his career as a walk-on. As a senior, he again started all 12 games at left tackle.

Since given a full scholarship, Remmers went on to start every game for the rest of his college career, and his 44 career starts ranked sixth in Beavers’ history at the time of his graduation.

== Professional career ==
Pre-draft measurables
Height	Weight	Arm length	Hand span	40-yard dash	10-yard split	20-yard split	20-yard shuttle	Three-cone drill	Vertical jump	Broad jump	Bench press
6 ft 5 in (1.96 m)	300 lb (136 kg)	30 1/4 in (0.77 m)	9 3/4 in (0.25 m)	5.14 s	1.75 s	2.76 s	4.70 s	7.36 s	27 in (0.69 m)	8 ft 7 in (2.62 m)	20 reps
All values from Oregon State Pro Day

=== Denver Broncos ===
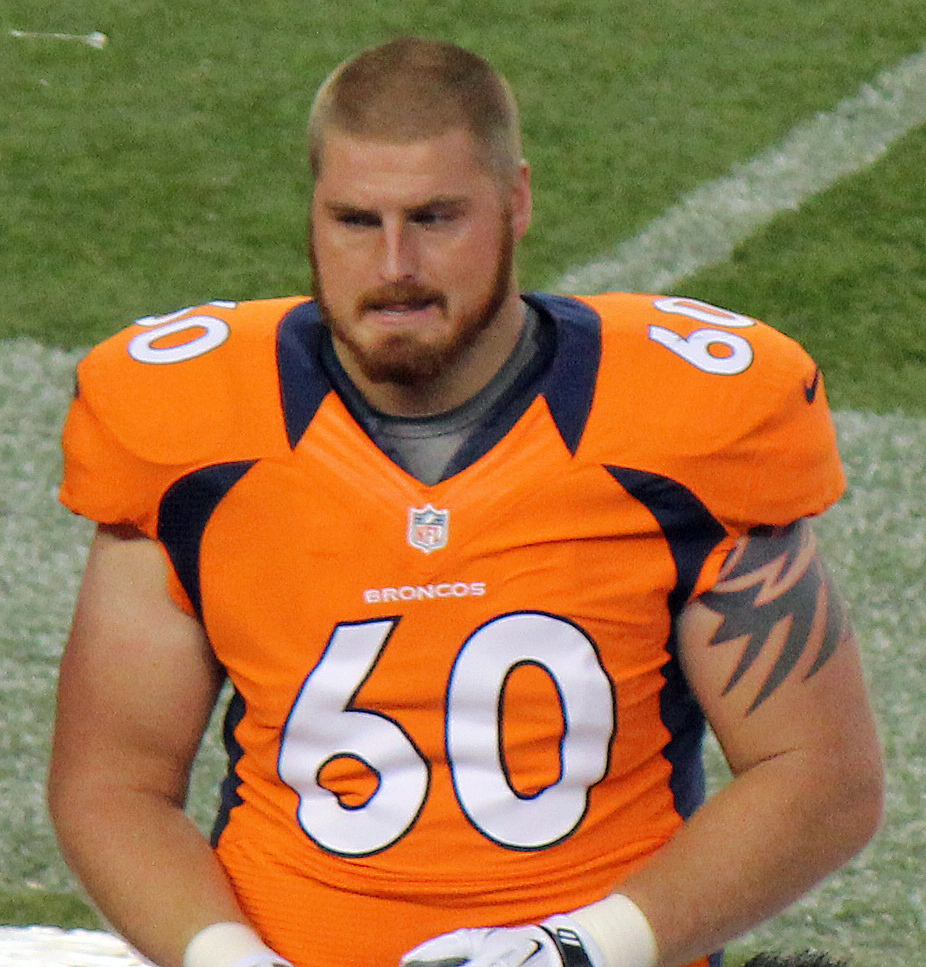
Remmers with the Denver Broncos in 2012

Remmers signed with the Denver Broncos as an undrafted free agent following the 2012 NFL draft. He was cut Week 4 of preseason.

=== Tampa Bay Buccaneers ===
Remmers signed with the Tampa Bay Buccaneers on September 11, 2012.

=== San Diego Chargers ===
Remmers was signed off the Buccaneers' practice squad by the San Diego Chargers on October 9, 2013. He made his NFL debut in Week 7 against the Jacksonville Jaguars. The Chargers waived him on November 23.

=== Minnesota Vikings (first stint) ===
The Minnesota Vikings claimed Remmers off waivers on November 25, 2013. A series of releasing and resigning would ensue with Remmers and the Vikings. The Vikings would waive Remmers on December 14, 2013, only to resign him two days later, on December 16, 2013. Following the 2013 NFL season, The Vikings released Remmers on August 31, 2014, and then resigned him once more on September 1, 2014. The Vikings released Remmers on September 3, 2014, for the final time of his initial stint with the Vikings.

=== St. Louis Rams ===
The St. Louis Rams signed Remmers to their practice squad on September 5, 2014.

=== Carolina Panthers ===
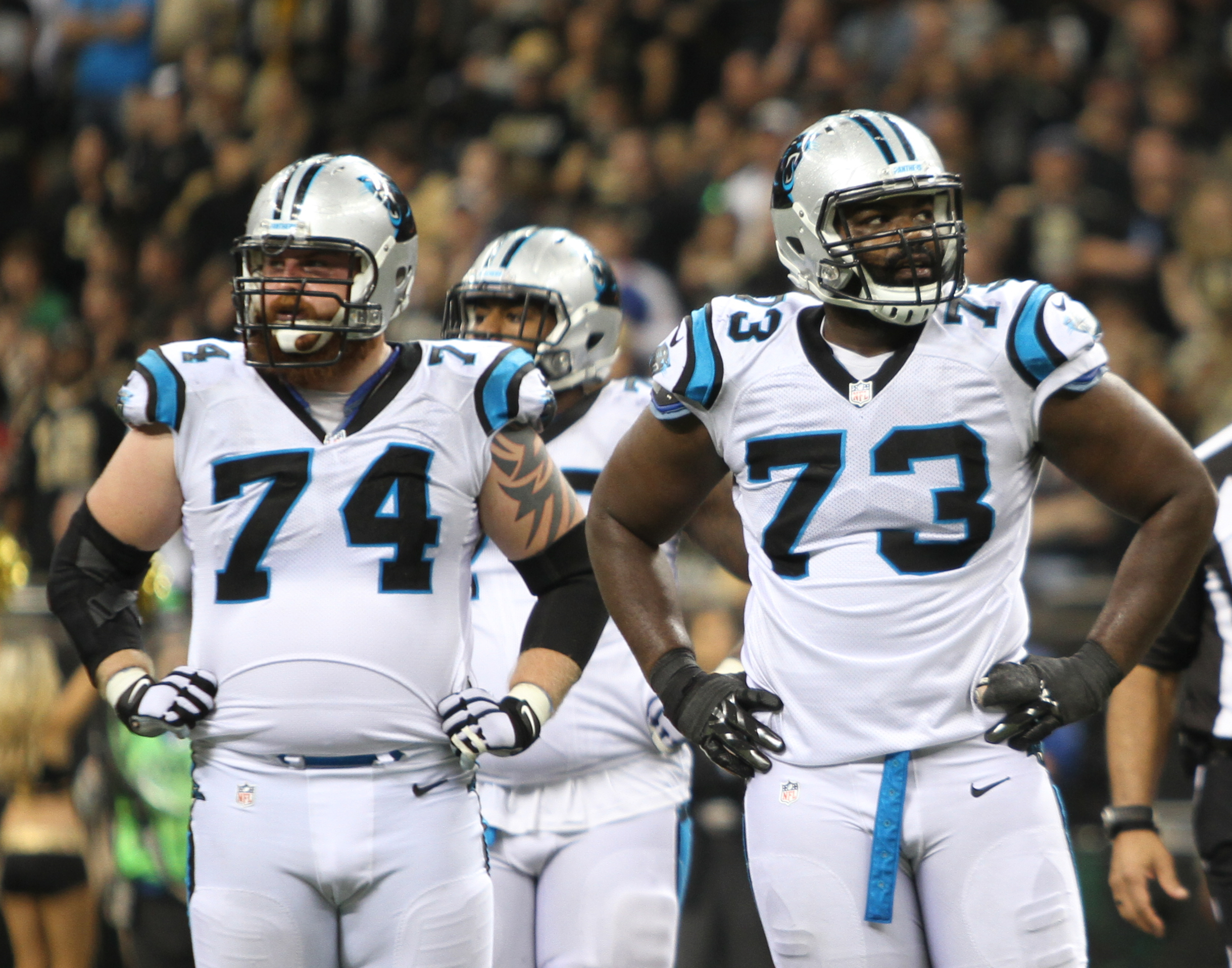
Remmers (left) and Michael Oher playing for the Panthers in 2015.

Remmers was signed off the Rams’ practice squad in October 2014 by the Carolina Panthers. During a rough stretch of the season the Panthers continued to make changes to their offensive line lineup, hoping to hit on a group that would gel. When injuries struck prior to the Week 13 Minnesota Vikings game, Remmers got his shot. With the newly installed Remmers at right tackle and Andrew Norwell at left guard, the O-line finally hit a groove. Though the game was a close loss, the coaching staff liked the lineup and Remmers remained a starter for the remainder of the season.

During the 2015 NFL draft, the Panthers selected offensive tackle Daryl Williams out of Oklahoma in the fourth round. Williams and Remmers would compete for the right tackle spot during training camp, with Remmers ultimately winning out. Remmers would go on to start at right tackle for the rest of the season as the Panthers went 17–1 in both the regular season and playoffs and made it to Super Bowl 50 against the Denver Broncos. Remmers had the worst professional game of his career in the Super Bowl as he was primarily matched up against the eventual game MVP Von Miller, allowing multiple pressures and two sacks, both of which led to fumbles recovered by Denver.

During training camp for the 2016 season, Remmers again competed with Daryl Williams for a starting position. Once more, Remmers won and entered the season as the Panthers' starting right tackle. However, in Week 4, against the Atlanta Falcons, with fellow tackle Michael Oher unable to play because of a concussion, Remmers drew the start as the Panther's left tackle. He would wind up remaining the Panther's starting left tackle throughout the remainder of the season, as Oher never returned from his concussion.

=== Minnesota Vikings (second stint) ===
On March 10, 2017, Remmers signed a five-year, $30 million contract with the Minnesota Vikings. In his first season with the Vikings, he started 11 games at right tackle, missing five games with a concussion and a lower back injury.

In 2018, Remmers was named the starting right guard, and started all 16 games.

On March 11, 2019, Remmers was released by the Vikings.

=== New York Giants ===
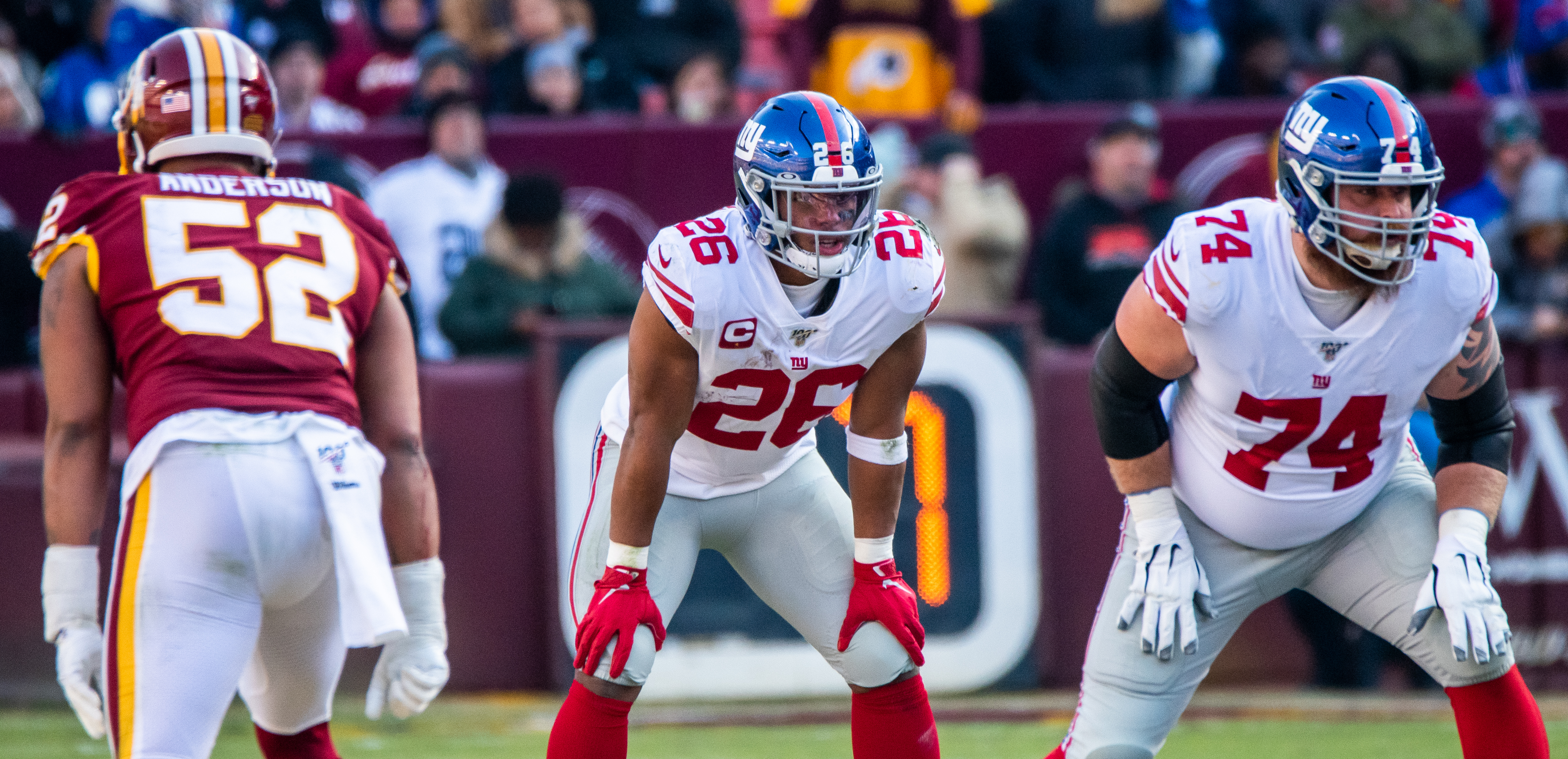
Remmers (right) in a game against the Washington Redskins

On May 11, 2019, Remmers signed a one-year deal worth $2,500,000 with the New York Giants. He started 14 games at right tackle in 2019.

=== Kansas City Chiefs ===
On March 23, 2020, Remmers signed a one-year contract with the Kansas City Chiefs. During the season, he showed his versatility taking snaps at right guard, right tackle, and left tackle. Remmers would once again appear in the Super Bowl, starting at left tackle in place of the injured Eric Fisher, as the Kansas City Chiefs fell to the Tampa Bay Buccaneers 9–31.

Remmers re-signed with the Chiefs on March 25, 2021. He continued on as their "swing tackle" in being prepared to play multiple positions on the Chiefs' offensive line. He was placed on injured reserve on November 15, 2021.

=== New York Jets ===
On September 27, 2022, Remmers signed with the practice squad of the New York Jets. He was promoted to the active roster on October 17.
