= Wayne Gibbens =

American politician (born 1937)

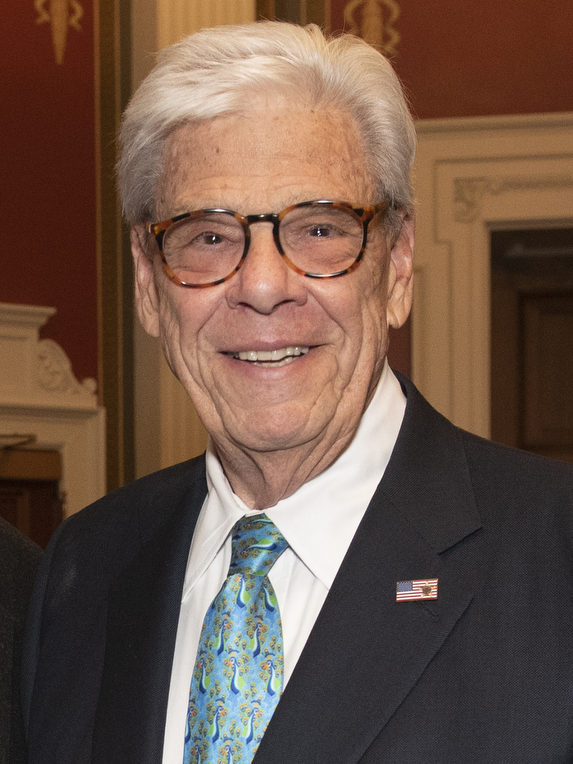
- Gibbens in 2020

Member of the Texas House of Representatives from the 63rd district
- In office January 8, 1963 – January 7, 1966
- Preceded by: J.E. Johnson
- Succeeded by: Burke Musgrove

Member of the Texas House of Representatives from the 75th district
- In office January 10, 1961 – January 8, 1963
- Preceded by: George Truett Wilson
- Succeeded by: Randy Pendleton

Personal details
- Born: October 1, 1937 (age 88)
- Party: Democratic
- Spouse: Beth
- Profession: oil and gas lobbyist

Wayne Gibbens (born October 1, 1937) is an American politician. He served as a Democratic member in the Texas House of Representatives from 1961 to 1966.

Texas House of Representatives
Preceded by George Truett Wilson	Member of the Texas House of Representatives from the 75th district January 10, 1961–January 8, 1963	Succeeded by Randy Pendleton
Preceded by J.E. Johnson	Member of the Texas House of Representatives from the 63rd district January 8, 1963–January 7, 1966	Succeeded by Burke Musgrove
