= Texas's 63rd House of Representatives district =

American legislative district

Texas's 63rd State House of Representatives district
Representative
| Ben Bumgarner; R–Flower Mound |
- Demographics: 50.0% White; 11.9% Black; 22.0% Hispanic; 14.3% Asian
- Population (2020) • Voting age: 202,319; 152,377

District 63 is a district in the Texas House of Representatives. It was created in the 5th legislature (1853–55).

The district has been represented by Republican Ben Bumgarner since January 10, 2023, upon his initial election to the Texas House.

As a result of redistricting after the 2020 Federal census, from the 2022 elections the district encompasses southwestern, and portions of southeastern and south central, Denton County. Major cities in the district include the majority of Flower Mound, Lewisville, Roanoke, and Trophy Club, and a portion of Carrollton.

== Elections ==
Texas House District 63 vote by party in recent elections
| Year | Democratic | Republican | Other |
|---|---|---|---|
| 2022 | 44.07% 28,342 | 55.93% 35,965 | - |
| 2020 | 32.58% 35,426 | 67.42% 73,297 | - |
| 2018 | 32.88% 25,944 | 67.12% 52,971 | - |
| 2016 | - | 100% 64,120 | - |
| 2014 | 22.66% 9,026 | 77.34 30,809 | - |
| 2012 | - | 85.31% 51,500 | 14.69% 8,865 |

== Representatives ==
| Leg. | Representative | Party | Term start | Term end | Counties represented |
|---|---|---|---|---|---|
| 5th | Henry Eustace McCulloch | Unknown | November 7, 1853 | November 5, 1855 | Guadalupe |
| 6th | John Rhodes King | Unknown | November 5, 1855 | November 2, 1857 | Guadalupe |
| 7th | Isham Vining Harris | Unknown | November 2, 1857 | November 7, 1859 | Guadalupe |
| 8th | Matthew Dawson Anderson | Unknown | November 7, 1859 | February 8, 1861 | Guadalupe |
| 8th | Washington Edmund Goodrich | Unknown | March 18, 1861 | November 4, 1861 | Guadalupe |
| 9th | Washington Edmund Goodrich | Unknown | November 4, 1861 | November 2, 1863 | Guadalupe |
| 9th | J.E. Harwell | Unknown | November 4, 1861 | November 2, 1863 | Lavaca |
| 10th | W. H. Howard | Unknown | November 2, 1863 | August 6, 1866 | Lavaca |
| 11th | William Tate | Unknown | August 6, 1866 | February 7, 1870 | Lavaca |
| 15th | Travis Shaw | Democratic | April 18, 1876 | January 14, 1879 | Fayette, Lee |
| 16th | Gottlieb Pauli | Republican | January 14, 1879 | January 11, 1881 | Fayette, Lee |
| 17th | Augustin Haidusek | Democratic | January 11, 1881 | January 9, 1883 | Fayette, Lee |
| 18th | Charles E. Gass | Democratic | January 9, 1883 | January 22, 1883 | Coryell Hamilton |
| 18th | C.W. Cotton | Democratic | January 22, 1883 | January 13, 1885 | Coryell Hamilton |
| 19th | John Powell "Jack" Key | Democratic | January 13, 1885 | January 11, 1887 | Coryell Hamilton |
| 20th | Andrew Carroll Graves | Republican | January 11, 1887 | January 8, 1889 | Coryell Hamilton |
| 21st | Crockett McDonald King | Democratic | January 8, 1889 | January 13, 1891 | Coryell Hamilton |
| 22nd | George Federick Perry | Democratic | January 13, 1891 | January 10, 1893 | Coryell Hamilton |
| 23rd | Romanus 'Roe' Talbot | Democratic | January 10, 1893 | January 8, 1895 | Robertson |
| 24th | Roger Lanier Mills Moody | Democratic | January 8, 1895 | January 12, 1897 | Robertson |
| 25th | W. P. Blackburn | Democratic | January 12, 1897 | January 10, 1899 | Robertson |
| 26th | Semmes Wilder Parish | Democratic | January 10, 1899 | January 8, 1901 | Robertson |
| 27th | Semmes Wilder Parish | Democratic | January 8, 1901 | January 13, 1903 | Robertson |
| 28th | Christopher Columbus Pearson | Democratic | January 13, 1903 | January 10, 1905 | Burnet, Williamson |
| 29th | Franklin Deaderick Love | Democratic | January 10, 1905 | January 8, 1907 | Burnet, Williamson |
| 30th | Franklin Deaderick Love | Democratic | January 8, 1907 | January 12, 1909 | Burnet, Williamson |
| 31st | Christopher Columbus Pearson | Democratic | January 12, 1909 | November 9, 1910 | Burnet, Williamson |
| 32nd | W. H. Corder | Democratic | January 10, 1911 | January 14, 1913 | Burnet, Williamson |
| 33rd | Joe Frank Coffey | Democratic | January 14, 1913 | March 26, 1914 | Falls, Limestone, McLennan |
| 33rd | Nicholas Patten Houx | Democratic | September 9, 1914 | January 12, 1915 | Falls, Limestone, McLennan |
| 34th | Edgar Earnest Witt | Democratic | January 12, 1915 | January 9, 1917 | Falls, Limestone, McLennan |
| 35th | Frank Minnock Fitzpatrick Sr. | Democratic | January 9, 1917 | January 14, 1919 | Falls, Limestone, McLennan |
| 36th | James Louis Quicksall Sr. | Democratic | January 14, 1919 | January 11, 1921 | Falls, Limestone, McLennan |
| 37th | James Louis Quicksall Sr. | Democratic | January 11, 1921 | January 9, 1923 | Falls, Limestone, McLennan |
| 38th | Cecil Anderson Morgan Sr. | Democratic | January 9, 1923 | January 13, 1925 | Robertson |
| 39th | Corry Thaddeus Sheats | Democratic | January 13, 1925 | January 11, 1927 | Robertson |
| 40th | Corry Thaddeus Sheats | Democratic | January 11, 1927 | January 8, 1929 | Robertson |
| 41st | Robert Brown Ewing | Democratic | January 8, 1929 | February 24, 1930 | Robertson |
| 42nd | Jacob Leonard Goodman | Democratic | January 13, 1931 | January 10, 1933 | Robertson |
| 43rd | Jacob Leonard Goodman | Democratic | January 10, 1933 | January 8, 1935 | Robertson |
| 44th | David Hollis Frazer | Democratic | January 8, 1935 | January 12, 1937 | Robertson |
| 45th | Cecil Taylor Rhodes | Democratic | January 12, 1937 | January 10, 1939 | Robertson |
| 46th | Cecil Taylor Rhodes | Democratic | January 10, 1939 | January 14, 1941 | Robertson |
| 47th | Cecil Taylor Rhodes | Democratic | January 14, 1941 | January 12, 1943 | Robertson |
| 48th | Cecil Taylor Rhodes | Democratic | January 12, 1943 | January 9, 1945 | Robertson |
| 49th | Herman R. Yezak | Democratic | January 9, 1945 | January 14, 1947 | Robertson |
| 50th | Herman R. Yezak | Democratic | January 14, 1947 | January 11, 1949 | Robertson |
| 51st | Herman R. Yezak | Democratic | January 11, 1949 | January 9, 1951 | Robertson |
| 52nd | Herman R. Yezak | Democratic | January 9, 1951 | January 13, 1953 | Robertson |
| 58th | Wayne Gibbens | Democratic | January 8, 1963 | January 12, 1965 | Callahan Eastland, Palo Pinto Shackelford, Stephens |
| 59th | Wayne Gibbens | Democratic | January 12, 1965 | January 7, 1966 | Callahan Eastland, Palo Pinto Shackelford, Stephens |
| 60th | Burke Musgrove | Democratic | January 10, 1967 | January 14, 1969 | Callahan Eastland, Palo Pinto Shackelford, Stephens |
| 61st | Robert Temple Dickson III | Democratic | January 14, 1969 | January 12, 1971 | Howard, Mitchell, Nolan |
| 62nd | Dee Jon Davis | Democratic | January 12, 1971 | January 9, 1973 | Howard, Mitchell, Nolan |
| 63rd | Renal Boyd "Al" Rosson | Democratic | January 9, 1973 | January 14, 1975 | Borden, Coke, Dawson Howard, Scurry, Sterling |
| 64th | Michael Herman "Mike" Ezzell | Democratic | January 14, 1975 | January 11, 1977 | Borden, Coke, Dawson Howard, Scurry, Sterling |
| 65th | Michael Herman "Mike" Ezzell | Democratic | January 11, 1977 | January 9, 1979 | Borden, Coke, Dawson Howard, Scurry, Sterling |
| 66th | Michael Herman "Mike" Ezzell | Democratic | January 9, 1979 | October 15, 1980 | Borden, Coke, Dawson Howard, Scurry, Sterling |
| 66th | Larry Don Shaw | Democratic | December 3, 1980 | January 13, 1981 | Borden, Coke, Dawson Howard, Scurry, Sterling |
| 67th | Larry Don Shaw | Democratic | January 13, 1981 | January 11, 1983 | Borden, Coke, Dawson Howard, Scurry, Sterling |
| 68th | William G. "Bill" Cody | Democratic | January 11, 1983 | January 8, 1985 | Cooke, Parker, Wise |
| 69th | Ric Williamson | Democratic | January 8, 1985 | January 13, 1987 | Cooke, Parker, Wise |
| 70th | Ric Williamson | Democratic | January 13, 1987 | January 10, 1989 | Cooke, Parker, Wise |
| 71st | Ric Williamson | Democratic | January 10, 1989 | January 8, 1991 | Cooke, Parker, Wise |
| 72nd | Ric Williamson | Democratic | January 8, 1991 | January 12, 1993 | Cooke, Parker, Wise |
| 73rd | Mary Diane Denny | Republican | January 14, 1993 | January 10, 1995 | Collin, Denton, Rockwall |
| 74th | Mary Diane Denny | Republican | January 10, 1995 | January 14, 1997 | Collin, Denton, Rockwall |
| 75th | Mary Diane Denny | Republican | January 14, 1997 | January 12, 1999 | Collin, Denton, Rockwall |
| 76th | Mary Diane Denny | Republican | January 12, 1999 | January 9, 2001 | Collin, Denton, Rockwall |
| 77th | Mary Diane Denny | Republican | January 9, 2001 | January 14, 2003 | Collin, Denton, Rockwall |
| 78th | Mary Diane Denny | Republican | January 14, 2003 | January 11, 2005 | Denton |
| 79th | Mary Diane Denny | Republican | January 11, 2005 | January 9, 2007 | Denton |
| 80th | Tan Parker | Republican | January 9, 2007 | January 13, 2009 | Denton |
| 81st | Tan Parker | Republican | January 13, 2009 | January 11, 2011 | Denton |
| 82nd | Tan Parker | Republican | January 11, 2011 | January 8, 2013 | Denton |
| 83rd | Tan Parker | Republican | January 8, 2013 | January 13, 2015 | Denton |
| 84th | Tan Parker | Republican | January 13, 2015 | January 10, 2017 | Denton |
| 85th | Tan Parker | Republican | January 10, 2017 | January 8, 2019 | Denton |
| 86th | Tan Parker | Republican | January 8, 2019 | January 12, 2021 | Denton |
| 87th | Tan Parker | Republican | January 12, 2021 | January 10, 2023 | Denton |
| 88th | Ben Bumgarner | Republican | January 10, 2023 | Present | Denton |
