= Joe Hanna =

American politician (1920–2003)

Joseph Currie Hanna

Member of the Texas House of Representatives from the 64th district
- In office January 11, 1983 – January 8, 1985
- Preceded by: John Wilson Buchanan
- Succeeded by: Rick Perry

Member of the Texas House of Representatives from the 54th district
- In office January 9, 1973 – January 11, 1983
- Preceded by: J.E. Ward
- Succeeded by: Stan Schlueter

Member of the Texas House of Representatives from the 53rd district
- In office January 12, 1971 – January 9, 1973
- Preceded by: Burke Musgrove
- Succeeded by: Charles Finnell

Personal details
- Born: Joseph Currie Hanna; May 19, 1920 Lawton, Oklahoma, U.S.
- Died: July 26, 2003 (aged 83) Breckenridge, Texas, U.S.
- Party: Democratic
- Spouse: Betty Elliott (1942-2003 his deaths)
- Children: 3 (including Judi Hanna)
- Education: John Tarleton Agricultural College; University of Texas, Austin

Military service
- Allegiance: United States
- Branch/service: United States Navy
- Battles/wars: World War II

Joseph Currie Hanna (May 19, 1920 – July 26, 2003) was an American politician who served in the Texas House of Representatives from 1971 to 1985.

== Biography ==
Hanna attended John Tarleton Agricultural College in 1940 and later transferred to University of Texas at Austin, studying Pre-law. He served as a fighter pilot in the United States Navy during World War II. He was elected to the Texas House of Representatives in 1984 and served a total of seven terms.

Hanna died on July 26, 2003, in Breckenridge, Texas.

Texas House of Representatives
Preceded by Burke Musgrove	Member of the Texas House of Representatives from the 53rd district January 12, 1971–January 9, 1973	Succeeded by Charles Finnell
Preceded by J.E. Ward	Member of the Texas House of Representatives from the 54th district January 9, 1973–January 11, 1983	Succeeded by Stan Schlueter
Preceded by John Wilson Buchanan	Member of the Texas House of Representatives from the 64th district January 11, 1983–January 8, 1985	Succeeded by Rick Perry
