= Daryl Williams (American football) =

American football player (born 1992)

No. 60, 75
- Position: Offensive tackle

Personal information
- Born: August 31, 1992 (age 34); Newport News, Virginia, U.S.
- Listed height: 6 ft 6 in (1.98 m)
- Listed weight: 330 lb (150 kg)

Career information
- High school: Lake Dallas (Corinth, Texas)
- College: Oklahoma (2010–2014)
- NFL draft: 2015: 4th round, 102nd overall pick

Career history
- Carolina Panthers (2015–2019); Buffalo Bills (2020–2021)

Awards and highlights
- Second-team All-Pro (2017); First-team All-Big 12 (2014); Second-team All-Big 12 (2013)

Career NFL statistics
- Games played: 89
- Games started: 74
- Stats at Pro Football Reference

Daryl Williams (born August 31, 1992) is an American former professional football player who was an offensive tackle in the National Football League (NFL). He played for the Carolina Panthers from 2015 to 2019, and with the Buffalo Bills from 2020 to 2021. He played college football for the Oklahoma Sooners.

== Early life ==
Daryl Williams was raised by his mother Lamesa Williams, primarily. His father Daryl Williams, Sr. was no longer part of his life after his parents divorced in 2007. Daryl is the second child of five children. He attended Lake Dallas High School in Corinth, Texas. He was named All-region by PrepStar. He graded out at 93 percent while recording 38 pancake blocks in 2009. He did not allow a sack for an offense that averaged 440 yards per game. Also a top performer in track & field, Williams had a top-throw of 15.52 meters (or 50'10") in the shot put. He was rated by Rivals.com as a four-star recruit. He committed to the University of Oklahoma to play college football.

== College career ==
Williams attended the University of Oklahoma from 2010 to 2014. After redshirting as a freshman, he played in nine games as a redshirt freshman. As a sophomore in 2012, Williams became a starter, starting all 10 games he played in. Williams started all 13 games in 2013 and 2014.

== Professional career ==
Pre-draft measurables
Height	Weight	Arm length	Hand span	40-yard dash	10-yard split	20-yard split	20-yard shuttle	Three-cone drill	Vertical jump	Broad jump	Bench press
6 ft 5 1/4 in (1.96 m)	327 lb (148 kg)	35 in (0.89 m)	9 3/4 in (0.25 m)	5.34 s	1.89 s	3.13 s	5.15 s	8.18 s	26.0 in (0.66 m)	8 ft 1 in (2.46 m)	27 reps
All values from NFL Combine/Pro Day

=== Carolina Panthers ===
Williams was selected by the Carolina Panthers in the fourth round (102nd overall) of the 2015 NFL draft. He played in ten regular season games, starting two of them, during the 2015 season. He played in all three playoff games for the Panthers that year.

On February 7, 2016, Williams was part of the Panthers team that played in Super Bowl 50. In the game, the Panthers fell to the Denver Broncos by a score of 24–10.

In Week 4 of the 2016 season, against the Atlanta Falcons, with fellow tackle Michael Oher unable to play because of a concussion, Mike Remmers drew the start as the Panther's left tackle and Williams the start at right tackle. Williams would wind up starting ten games as the Panthers' right tackle throughout the remainder of the season, missing three games because of an ankle sprain, as Oher never returned from his concussion.

Williams became a full-time starter for the Panthers in 2017, starting all 16 games at right tackle.

On July 28, 2018, during training camp, Williams was carted off the field with an apparent knee injury. It was later revealed that day that Williams dislocated his right kneecap and tore his MCL. Despite the injury, Williams started in the season opener against the Dallas Cowboys, however left the game in the fourth quarter with a knee injury. It was confirmed that Williams had re-injured his right knee and would be sidelined indefinitely. He was then placed on injured reserve on September 12, 2018, after deciding to undergo knee surgery.

On March 14, 2019, Williams signed a one-year, $7 million contract with the Panthers. He played in all 16 games, starting 12 games: four at left tackle, three at right guard, and five at left guard.

=== Buffalo Bills ===
Williams signed a one-year contract with the Buffalo Bills on April 1, 2020. He started every game at right tackle for the Bills in 2020.

Williams signed a three-year, $28.2 million contract extension with the team on March 12, 2021. He started all 17 games in 2021, splitting time at right guard and right tackle.

On March 14, 2022, Williams was released by the Bills.
