= Lynn Nabers =

American politician

Member of the Texas House of Representatives from the 55th district
- In office January 9, 1973 – January 11, 1983
- Preceded by: James E. Nugent
- Succeeded by: Rollin Khoury

Member of the Texas House of Representatives from the 64th district
- In office January 14, 1969 – January 9, 1973
- Preceded by: Ben Barnes
- Succeeded by: L. Dean Cobb

Personal details
- Born: Joseph Lynn Nabers; March 31, 1940 Brownwood, Texas
- Died: July 31, 2010 (aged 70) Austin, Texas
- Party: Democratic

Joseph Lynn Nabers (March 31, 1940 – July 31, 2010) was an American politician who served in the Texas House of Representatives from 1969 to 1983.

Nabers was a graduate of Howard Payne University and Baylor University.

He died of cancer on July 31, 2010, in Austin, Texas, at age 70.
