= Josh Jackson (cornerback) =

American football player (born 1996)

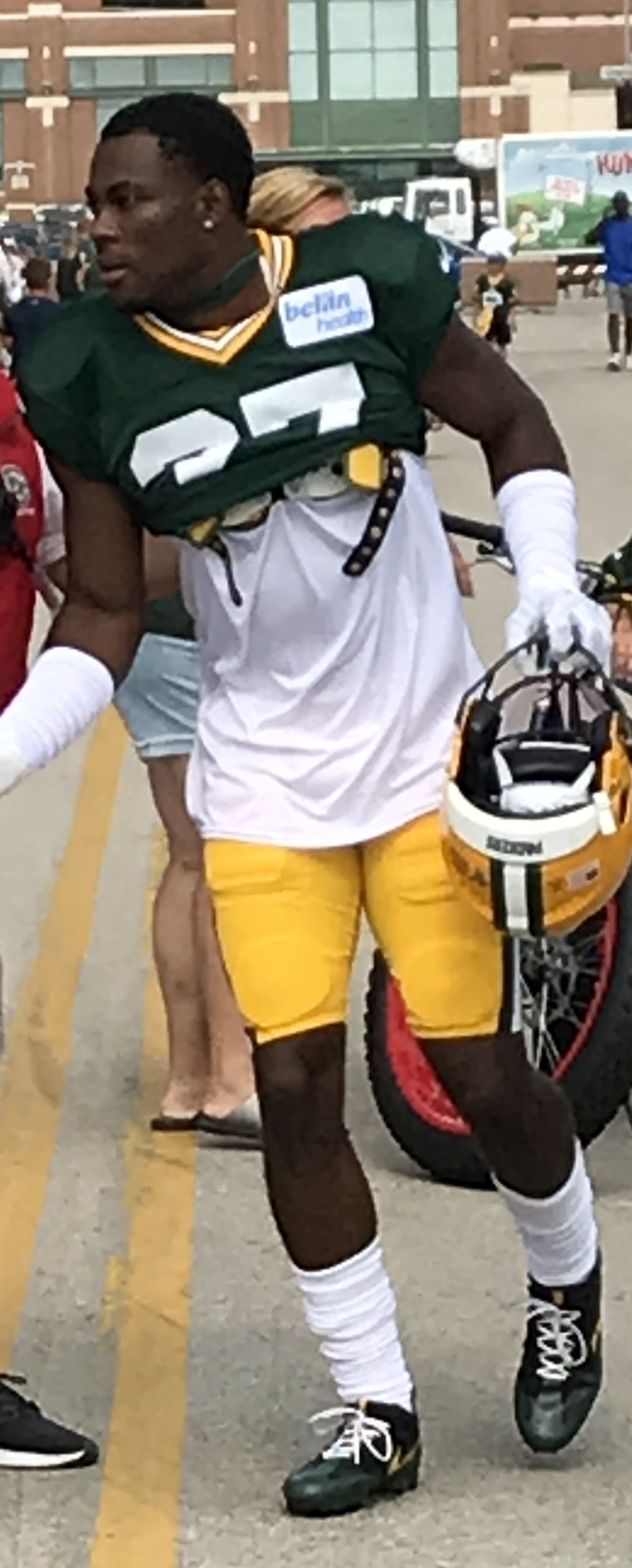
- Jackson with the Green Bay Packers in 2019

No. 37, 20, 16, 26
- Position: Cornerback

Personal information
- Born: April 3, 1996 (age 30); Houston, Texas, U.S.
- Listed height: 6 ft 0 in (1.83 m)
- Listed weight: 196 lb (89 kg)

Career information
- High school: Lake Dallas (Corinth, Texas)
- College: Iowa (2014-2017)
- NFL draft: 2018: 2nd round, 45th overall pick

Career history
- Green Bay Packers (2018–2020); New York Giants (2021); Kansas City Chiefs (2021); Arizona Cardinals (2022)*; Pittsburgh Steelers (2022); Arizona Cardinals (2022)
- * Offseason or practice squad member only

Awards and highlights
- Unanimous All-American (2017); Jack Tatum Trophy (2017); Big Ten Defensive Back of the Year (2017); First-team All-Big Ten (2017)

Career NFL statistics
- Total tackles: 90
- Fumble recoveries: 1
- Pass deflections: 12
- Total touchdowns: 1
- Stats at Pro Football Reference

Joshua Randolph Jackson (born April 3, 1996) is an American former professional football player who was a cornerback in the National Football League (NFL). He played college football for the Iowa Hawkeyes, earning unanimous All-American honors. He was selected by the Green Bay Packers in the second round of the 2018 NFL draft.

== Early life ==
Jackson attended Lake Dallas High School in Corinth, Texas, where he played high school football as a cornerback and wide receiver. He committed to the University of Iowa to play college football.

== College career ==
After redshirting his first year at Iowa in 2014, Jackson played in all 14 games in 2015, recording eight tackles. In 2016, he played in 12 games and made one start and recorded 10 tackles. As a first year starter his junior year in 2017, Jackson was named Big Ten Defensive Back of the Year and a finalist for the Jim Thorpe Award. On January 3, 2018, Jackson declared his intentions to enter the 2018 NFL draft.

== Professional career ==
External videos
- Josh Jackson's NFL Combine Workout
- Josh Jackson runs a 4.56s 40-yard dash
- 2018 NFL Draft Profile: Josh Jackson

Pre-draft measurables
Height	Weight	Arm length	Hand span	Wingspan	40-yard dash	10-yard split	20-yard split	20-yard shuttle	Three-cone drill	Vertical jump	Broad jump	Bench press
6 ft 0 3/8 in (1.84 m)	196 lb (89 kg)	31 1/8 in (0.79 m)	9 3/8 in (0.24 m)	6 ft 2 1/4 in (1.89 m)	4.56 s	1.57 s	2.61 s	4.03 s	6.86 s	38 in (0.97 m)	10 ft 3 in (3.12 m)	18 reps
All values from NFL Combine

=== Green Bay Packers ===
The Green Bay Packers selected Jackson in the second round (45th overall) of the 2018 NFL draft. Jackson was the fourth cornerback drafted in 2018 and was the second selected by the Packers after Jaire Alexander (18th overall).

External videos
- Packers draft Josh Jackson 45th overall
- Jackson "Packers are getting a baller"
- Instant Draft Grade: Josh Jackson

On May 17, 2018, the Packers signed Jackson to a four-year, $6.25 million contract that includes $3.87 million guaranteed and a signing bonus of $2.62 million.

Throughout training camp, Jackson competed to be a starting cornerback against Kevin King, Jaire Alexander, Tramon Williams, and Davon House. Head coach Mike McCarthy named Jackson the fifth cornerback on the depth chart to begin the regular season, behind Williams, King, Alexander, and House.

He made his professional regular season debut and first career start in the Packers' season-opener against the Chicago Bears and made three solo tackles during their 24–23 victory. On September 16, 2018, Jackson recorded four solo tackles and scored the first touchdown of his career during a 29–29 tie against the Minnesota Vikings in Week 2. Jackson recovered a punt by Matt Wile and caught it in the endzone for a touchdown after it was blocked by Geronimo Allison during the first quarter. On November 25, 2018, Jackson collected a season-high eight combined tackles during a 24–17 loss at the Vikings in Week 12. On December 2, 2018, the Packers fired McCarthy after they fell to a 4–7–1 record. He finished his rookie season in 2018 with 48 combined tackles (39 solo) and ten pass deflections in 16 games and ten starts.

Jackson largely served as a depth role for the Packers, receiving playing time when primary starter Kevin King was injured. He received criticism for his preseason performance ahead of the 2021 season.

=== New York Giants ===
On August 17, 2021, Jackson was traded to the New York Giants for cornerback Isaac Yiadom. He was waived on October 26, 2021, without having played in a regular season game for the Giants.

=== Kansas City Chiefs ===
Jackson signed with the practice squad of the Kansas City Chiefs on October 29, 2021. He was released on January 18, 2022.

=== Arizona Cardinals (first stint) ===
Jackson signed with the Arizona Cardinals on June 16, 2022. He was released on August 29.

=== Pittsburgh Steelers ===
On September 5, 2022, Jackson was signed to the Pittsburgh Steelers practice squad. On October 15, 2022, Jackson was promoted to the active roster. He was released on December 24, 2022.

=== Arizona Cardinals (second stint) ===
On December 26, 2022, Jackson was claimed off waivers by the Cardinals.

== Career statistics ==
=== NFL ===
Year	Team	Games		Tackles				Interceptions						Fumbles	
Year	Team	GP	GS	Comb	Total	Ast	Sck	PD	Int	Yds	Avg	Lng	TDs	FF	FR
2018	GB	16	10	46	36	10	0.0	10	0	0	0	0	0	0	1
2019	GB	14	0	11	11	0	0.0	0	0	0	0	0	0	0	0
2020	GB	12	5	24	19	5	0.0	2	0	0	0	0	0	0	0
Career		42	15	81	66	15	0.0	12	0	0	0	0	0	0	1
Source: NFL.com

=== College ===
Year	Team	GP	Defense						
Year	Team	GP	Tackles	For Loss	Passes Def	Int	Yards	TD	FF
2015	Iowa	14	8	0.0	2	0	0	0	0
2016	Iowa	12	10	1.0	4	0	0	0	0
2017	Iowa	13	48	0.5	18	8	168	2	1
Totals		39	66	1.5	24	8	168	2	1
