= Dusty Dvoracek =

American football player (born 1983)

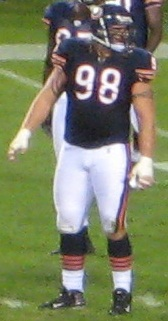
- Dvoracek with the Chicago Bears in 2008

No. 98, 94
- Position: Nose guard

Personal information
- Born: March 3, 1983 (age 43); Lake Dallas, Texas, U.S.
- Listed height: 6 ft 3 in (1.91 m)
- Listed weight: 303 lb (137 kg)

Career information
- High school: Lake Dallas (Corinth, Texas)
- College: Oklahoma
- NFL draft: 2006: 3rd round, 73rd overall pick

Career history
- Chicago Bears (2006–2009); Omaha Nighthawks (2010–2011)

Awards and highlights
- Third-team All-American (2003); 2× First-team All-Big 12 (2003, 2005)

Career NFL statistics
- Total tackles: 31
- Stats at Pro Football Reference

Dusty Dvoracek (born March 3, 1983) is an American former professional football player who was a nose guard for the Chicago Bears of the National Football League (NFL). Selected by the Chicago Bears of the NFL in the third round of the 2006 NFL draft, he played college football for the Oklahoma Sooners and professionally with the Bears from 2006 to 2009 and the Omaha Nighthawks of the United Football League (UFL) in 2010–11.

Since retiring from football, Dvoracek has worked as a color analyst for Fox Sports Southwest, Fox Sports Oklahoma, and ESPN, and an analyst on SiriusXM and KWTV. Dvoracek co-hosted a sports radio show on Oklahoma City's WWLS until he left at the end of 2020.

== Early life ==
Dvoracek attended Lake Dallas High School in Corinth, Texas, where he played football at the positions of defensive tackle and offensive guard. During his senior year, he was named to the Houston Chronicle's Top 100 list and the Dallas Morning News's Texas Top 100. He was also named all-district both on offense and defense in his senior year, while tallying up 79 tackles, 9.5 sacks, four fumble recoveries, and 10 forced fumbles in just seven games.

== College career ==
Dvoracek attended the University of Oklahoma, where he majored in management. In 49 games at Oklahoma, Dvoracek started 28 times. He finished his career with 136 tackles (44 tackles for loss), 16 sacks, one interception and three fumble recoveries. He was a consensus All-Big 12 performer in 2003 and 2005. In 2004, Dvoracek was suspended from the Sooners after an alleged assault that resulted in the hospitalization of a long time high school friend, then 21-year-old Matthew Wilde. He was backup to future Chicago Bears teammate, Tommie Harris, and started ahead of future WWE World Heavyweight Champion, Jack Swagger.

== Professional career ==
Pre-draft measurables
Height	Weight	Arm length	Hand span	40-yard dash	10-yard split	20-yard split	20-yard shuttle	Three-cone drill	Vertical jump	Broad jump	Bench press
6 ft 2 3/4 in (1.90 m)	306 lb (139 kg)	32 1/4 in (0.82 m)	9 1/2 in (0.24 m)	4.83 s	1.74 s	2.96 s	4.35 s	7.59 s	34.0 in (0.86 m)	9 ft 6 in (2.90 m)	31 reps
All values from NFL Combine/Pro Day

=== Chicago Bears ===
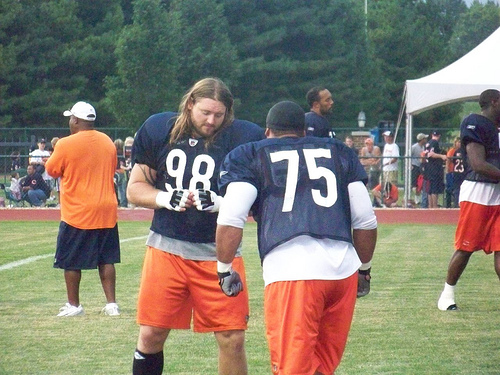
Dvoracek and Matt Toeaina during training camp in 2008

The Chicago Bears selected Dvoracek with the 73rd overall pick in the third round of the 2006 NFL draft. He missed most of his rookie season after sustaining a foot injury in the preseason.

Dvoracek started his first professional game against the San Diego Chargers on September 9, 2007, but left the game with a season ending torn ACL injury.

Dvoracek recovered during the 2008 offseason, injured his calf before the Bears training camp. He was placed on season-ending injured reserve with elbow bursitis on December 9. He finished the 2008 season with 29 tackles and two passes defensed on 12 games (all starts).

Dvoracek suffered a sprained MCL during the Bears second preseason game on August 22, 2009. He underwent arthroscopic knee surgery to assess the severity of the injury. The examination concluded that Dvoracek had also injured his ACL, and would miss the 2009 season. He was waived/injured on August 31 and subsequently reverted to injured reserve, his fourth consecutive year ending on the IR list.

=== Omaha Nighthawks ===
Dvoracek was signed by the Omaha Nighthawks in 2010. He was re-signed by the team on July 15, 2011. He was let go after the 2011 season.
