= Champ d'Or Estate =

Building in Hickory Creek, Texas, US

Coordinates: 33.1250°N 97.0542°W

The Champ d'Or estate is a pseudo-French Baroque residential building located in Hickory Creek, Texas. Inspired by Vaux-le-Vicomte (Note: The Château de Vaux-le-Vicomte is a famous French Château located in Maincy, in the Seine-et-Marne département of France. It was built from 1658 to 1661 for Nicolas Fouquet, Marquis de Belle-Isle (Belle-Ile-en-Mer), Viscount of Melun and Vaux, the superintendent of finances of Louis XIV.) near Paris, France. The building situated at 1851 Turbeville Road, in Denton County, Champ d'Or—literally, "Field of Gold," from the surname of Alan and Shirley Goldfield, who built the house in 2002s 17th century architecture and design.

Champ d'Or was one of the more unusual architectural works in North Texas, featured not only in countless news articles, most notably being Forbes Magazine, but also gaining notoriety through its appearance in at least one book on French architecture and interior design. Champ d'Or's dominance of the Hickory Creek landscape has made the place of a tourist attraction. The estate has been re branded as "The Olana" and is now a wedding venue under Walters Wedding Estates.

== The building ==
Champ d'Or took five years to plan and construct, using materials from all over the nation. The 25-acre (100,000 m^{2}) estate includes the 48,000-square-foot (4,500 m^{2}) mansion, an adjacent one-and-a-half-acre lake, formal gardens, indoor and outdoor swimming area, a tennis court, a tennis house and two small and symmetrical guard buildings. The sprawling house features a dome with a ceiling height of 78 feet (24 m); a ballroom with Versailles-style mirrors; a garden room with windows which descend electronically, opening to a veranda which seats 450 for dinner; a two-story Chanel-styled closet in the master; a theater; a bowling alley, and a racquetball court.

=== Controversy ===
Because of its size, soaring price tag (The home has been listed for sale multiple times, with prices ranging between 27.5 million and 60 million), and what critics see as a gaudy interior, Champ d'Or has been depicted as one of the region's most glaring displays of wealth-driven foppery. In April 2009, D Magazine named the property "The Biggest Little Teardown in Texas", scathingly writing:

In the distance, you’ll see something so huge and so incongruous in its French-baroque-meets-Plano-McMansion mashup that it seems more hallucination than house.

The chateau's ornate design, including marble floors, gold plated elevator, and hand-carved spiral staircase did not appeal to prospective buyers for several years. The house passed from listing agent to listing agent, from 2003 to 2009, with no serious offers.

== History ==
In April 2012, Champ d'Or Estate sold to the highest bidder through a luxury real estate auction by Concierge Auctions, a national luxury real estate auction firm. Following 433 auction inquiries, over 500 showings and over 10,000 website visitors, the estate, named Champ d'Or, which translates to "Field of Gold", was sold in cooperation with listing agent Joan Eleazer of Briggs Freeman Sotheby's International Realty and the buyer's agent, Clay Stapp.
