= Lake Dallas Independent School District =

School district in Texas

Address
- 104 Swisher Road Lake Dallas, TX, USA ESC Region 11
- Coordinates: 33°7′46″N 97°2′1″W

District information
- Type: Independent School District
- Motto: Small School Atmosphere, Big School Opportunities
- Grades: PK-12
- Established: September 1, 1959; 67 years ago
- Superintendent: Dr. Kristin N. Brown
- Governing agency: Texas Education Agency
- Schools: 5
- NCES District ID: 4826430

Students and staff
- Students: 3940 (2025-2026)
- Athletic conference: UIL Class AAAA
- District mascot: Falcons
- Colors: Green; White

Other information
- Website: www.ldisd.net

Lake Dallas Independent School District (Lake Dallas ISD or LISD) is a public school district based in Lake Dallas, Texas, United States. Covering 9.8 square miles in Denton County, the district serves all of Lake Dallas, most of Hickory Creek, approximately half of Corinth, and a small portion of Shady Shores.

As of 2026, Lake Dallas ISD operates 5 campuses, including 1 high school, 1 middle school, and 3 elementary schools. The district most recently received a "B" rating from the Texas Education Agency (TEA).

== History ==
Lake Dallas ISD's roots date back to November 1, 1907, when Garza Independent District was formed. At that time, the Lake Dallas area was called Garza. In 1935, the district's name was changed to Lake Dallas CSD. On September 1, 1959, the district was converted into Lake Dallas Independent School District.

The district operated a single campus on Main Street for many years. In the 1970s, a stand-alone Lake Dallas High School facility was opened nearby facing Hundley Drive. In 1980, Lake Dallas Middle School opened across the street on the north side of Hundley Drive.

As of 1984, LDISD operated 4 campuses: Lake Dallas HS (grades 9-12), Lake Dallas MS (7-8), Lake Dallas Elementary School (3-6), and Lake Dallas Primary School (PK-2). 6th grade was relocated from the elementary to middle school in 1986.

Grades PK-2 were divided up once Corinth Primary School opened in 1991. 6th grade returned to the middle school in 1993. A bond election was passed in the mid-1990s to fund a replacement for LDHS in Corinth.

The new high school campus opened in 1998, and the following changes were subsequently made: LDMS (7-8) moved to the former high school building across the street, the former middle school became Lake Dallas Intermediate School (5-6), and LDES was left with grades 3-4.

In 2001, LDISD underwent another grade reconfiguration at the lower levels. Corinth Primary was expanded and renamed as an elementary, becoming a K-4 campus. Lake Dallas Primary (PK-1) and Lake Dallas Elementary (2-4) divvied up the students in the other feeder.

A $65,000,000 bond proposition was passed by voters in 2002, which funded expansions and renovations to both LDHS and LDIS, as well as the construction of a new elementary school. The intermediate school expansion was completed in 2005 and the middle school returned to this location with grades 6-8. It is unclear what happened to 5th grade, but it presumably moved to the former middle and high school campus as the new Lake Dallas Intermediate School.

Shady Shores Elementary School opened with grades 1-4 in 2006, replacing LDES, which was closed for a few years. Lake Dallas Primary became a PK-K facility. The high school expansion was completed in 2007.

Also in 2007, voters approved a $25,000,000 bond proposal to build another elementary school and expand Falcon Stadium. The new Lake Dallas Elementary School opened in 2009 at its previous site and the intermediate and primary campuses closed. Each elementary school offered grades K-5, with LDES and SSES offering PK as well.

A $107,077,104 bond proposal was approved by voters in May 2019 to fund expansions and renovations to LDHS, LDMS, LDES, CES, and for the District Alternative Education Program (DAEP) at Lake Dallas ISD Central Services (the former primary school campus).

== Schools ==
Name	Grades	Established	Additional information
Lake Dallas High School	9-12	Unknown	Current campus opened in 1998
Lake Dallas Middle School	6-8	1980	
Corinth Elementary School	PK-5	1991	
Lake Dallas Elementary School	PK-5	2009	
Shady Shores Elementary School	PK-5	2006	
