= Ben Bumgarner =

American politician

Benjamin Bumgarner

Member of the Texas House of Representatives from the 63rd district
- Incumbent
- Assumed office January 10, 2023
- Preceded by: Tan Parker

Personal details
- Party: Republican
- Spouse: Caroline "Mindy" Bumgarner (m. 2014)
- Children: 1
- Education: Austin College
- Occupation: Businessman

Benjamin Bumgarner is an American politician who currently serves in the Texas House of Representatives from the 63rd District, which covers southern Denton County.

== Education and personal life ==
Bumgarner graduated from Austin College. He is a businessman who is the owner of Evolve Weapon Systems. He and his wife, Mindy, have one daughter. They are Methodists.

== Political career ==
=== Local ===
Prior to his election into the Texas House, he served on the Flower Mound Town Council, including one term as Mayor Pro Tem.

=== Texas Legislature ===
==== 88th Texas Legislature ====
In 2022, he ran for the vacant seat in the 63rd District, as then-incumbent Tan Parker opted to run for the vacancy in the 12th District in the Texas Senate.

Bumgarner faced three candidates in the Republican primary: Jake Collier (a former Denton County District Judge), Nick Sanders, and Jeff Younger. Bumgarner and Younger met in the primary runoff where Bumgarner won by a near 2-1 margin. Bumgarner then faced Democratic candidate Denise Wooten in the general election, winning by a 10-point margin.

Bumgarner supports a ban on Democrats being given committee chairmanships as long as the Republicans hold the majority of seats in the Texas House.

In his first term, Bumgarner served on the Defense & Veterans Affairs and the International Relations & Economic Development Committees.

Bumgarner also voted to expel Bryan Slaton from the House and to impeach Ken Paxton.

Among his notable legislation was HB3579, giving the Texas Department of Licensing and Regulation the authority to shut down massage therapy locations which were providing sexual services to clients.

==== 89th Texas Legislature ====
Bumgarner ran for re-election, facing two opponents in the Republican primary: Vincent Gallo and Carlos E. Andino, Jr. Bumgarner won without a runoff. He then faced Democratic candidate Michelle Beckley, a former State Representative (from the 65th District prior to its redrawing after the 2020 Census) in the general election and won.

==== 90th Texas Legislature ====
Bumgarner is running for re-election; he had no opponents in the Republican primary. He faced Wooten a second time in the general election.
