= Burke Musgrove =

American politician

Member of the Texas House of Representatives from the 53rd district
- In office January 14, 1969 – January 12, 1971
- Preceded by: Tom Holmes
- Succeeded by: Joe Hanna

Member of the Texas House of Representatives from the 63rd district
- In office January 10, 1967 – January 14, 1969
- Preceded by: Wayne Gibbens
- Succeeded by: Robert Temple Dickson III

Personal details
- Born: March 31, 1941 Vernon, Texas
- Died: April 13, 1993 (aged 52) Comanche, Texas
- Party: Democratic

Burke Musgrove (March 31, 1941 – April 13, 1993) was an American politician who served in the Texas House of Representatives from 1967 to 1971.

He died in a car accident on April 13, 1993, in Comanche, Texas at age 52.

Texas House of Representatives
Preceded by Wayne Gibbens	Member of the Texas House of Representatives from the 63rd district January 10, 1967–January 14, 1969	Succeeded by Temple Dickson
Preceded by Tom Holmes	Member of the Texas House of Representatives from the 53rd district January 14, 1969–January 12, 1971	Succeeded by Joe Hanna
