= Jeff Younger–Anne Georgulas custody battle =

Texas family law dispute (2018–present)

Beginning in 2018, Texas parents Jeff Younger and Anne Georgulas fought over custody of their twin children, born in 2012. The case attracted national attention, as one of their children has identified as a transgender girl since the age of three, and was formally diagnosed with gender dysphoria at age five. Georgulas affirms her daughter's identity and allowed her to socially transition, while Younger denies that she is transgender.

In 2019, the Dallas County District Court gave both parents shared custody, but later in 2021 granted Georgulas sole custody, with the exception that both parents would need to consent for their daughter to receive gender affirming care such as puberty blockers.

In 2022, Younger petitioned the Supreme Court of Texas to block Georgulas from moving with the children to California (which had recently passed a "trans sanctuary state" bill), but the court dismissed his petition. In 2024, a California judge awarded Georgulas full custody and medical authority over their daughter.

Younger's social media campaign against Georgulas attracted substantial attention from conservative, parents' rights, and LGBTQ groups. In 2021, Younger unsuccessfully ran for the Texas House of Representatives.

== Background ==
Jeffery Damon Younger, a resident of Flower Mound, Texas, and Anne Georgulas, a pediatrician from Coppell, Texas, had their marriage annulled in 2016. They had fraternal twins, born in 2012, whom they shared joint custody over.

At age three, one of their children expressed a desire to be a girl. She was clinically diagnosed with gender dysphoria at age five, and began presenting as female and using a feminine name. Georgulas allowed her to socially transition, paint her nails and wear dresses. As of 2018, their daughter presented as a girl at school and in public.

Georgulas alleged that Younger had engaged in emotional abuse in response to their daughter's gender identity. Georgulas's attorney, a fellow mother and family friend, testified that although she wanted to grow her hair long, Younger would shave it short when given the opportunity.

In August 2018, Georgulas filed for a restraining order against Younger, forbidding him from entering their daughter's school or outing her as transgender to other parents. She also filed a lawsuit to alter their custody agreement to require Younger to use their daughter's chosen name and pronouns, and prevent her from spending time with those who did not. Georgulas attempted to enroll her in gender identity counseling at GENECIS—a pediatric transgender clinic in Dallas which shut down in 2023—but they could not accept her as a patient without Younger's approval.

=== Web campaign by Younger ===
In response, Younger counter-petitioned for full custody of the twins. He launched an internet campaign claiming his daughter presented as a boy when spending time with him, and accused Georgulas of manipulating her gender identity, or pressuring her into transitioning.

Younger repeatedly claimed that Georgulas imminently planned to "mutilate" or "chemically castrate" her. Vox called this "a misinformed, scary-sounding reference" to puberty blockers, which their daughter (then seven) would not need for several more years. Georgulas said her only plan was to take her daughter to GENECIS, a pediatric clinic for transgender children.

Transgender genital surgeries are not performed on minors in the United States, let alone on prepubescent children. Prior to puberty, treatment for transgender children consists entirely of counseling and guidance with social transition. When a child reaches puberty, puberty blockers may be prescribed to delay or prevent a masculinizing or feminizing puberty, and patients can stop taking blockers if they choose.

Younger's campaign drew the support of Texas Republican politicians such as U.S. Senator Ted Cruz and U.S. Representative Dan Crenshaw, and netted approximately $139,000 in crowdfunding and merchandising. Per Georgulas' attorneys, this publicity led to threats, harassment and vandalism against her and her daughter by strangers, including graffiti, dead animals, and rocks thrown at her house.

== Court decisions ==
=== October 2019 ruling ===
On October 24, 2019, a jury decided 11–1 to give Georgulas sole custody over the children. Judge Kim Cooks defied the jury, and awarded Younger and Georgulas joint custody. Cooks ordered that any medical decisions for the twins be made by both parents in agreement. She criticized both parents in her ruling: Georgulas for her testimony that she may have "over-affirmed" her child's identity, and Younger for his efforts to raise donations and publicity from the case at the expense of his children's privacy.

Immediately following Cooks' ruling, Georgulas filed a motion asking the district court to conform to the jury's original decision. In January 2020, Judge Mary Brown reaffirmed Cook's ruling.

=== August 2021 ruling ===
In August 2021, Brown awarded Georgulas full custody, after Younger "failed to timely make the payments of child support, medical support and interest as ordered". Georgulas' legal team claimed that Younger, in addition to paying child support late, had refused to carry out court orders including required counseling and educational decisions. Younger claimed he had made payments on time but they had been disbursed late. According to the ruling, both parents would still need to consent for their daughter to receive puberty blockers or hormone therapy.

=== 2022 Texas Supreme Court petition ===
In September 2022, Georgulas moved with the twins in California. Younger, representing himself, petitioned the Texas Supreme Court to return them to Texas. California had recently passed SB 107, which Younger speculated would allow his daughter to medically transition.

Justices Jimmy Blacklock and Evan Young denied his petition, writing that it was based on a misunderstanding of the new law, and that the court "cannot intervene based on tenuous speculation about what other courts might do in the future". They noted Georgulas had already agreed to a court order that she would not seek transgender care for their daughter without Younger's consent, and testified that she did not intend to use SB 107 to do so. Blacklock commented, "I find it troubling that [Younger] has refused to see either of his children in over a year despite abundant opportunities to do so."

=== 2024 California court decision ===
On November 11, 2024, a California court denied Younger custody, and gave Georgulas authority to seek transgender health care for the now 12-year-old.

Younger was awarded supervised visitation, but tweeted on November 19 that he would not make use of this, because the supervision "reinforces in a child's mind that the father is dangerous, that something is wrong with him." He said he will send them "letters and gifts" instead.

== Further developments ==
=== 2021 Jeff Younger state legislature bid ===
Younger ran as a Republican in the 2022 election for the Texas House of Representatives 63rd District, after then-incumbent Tan Parker vacated the seat to successfully run for the Texas Senate. As part of his platform, Younger pledged to ban medical gender transition for minors. Facing three other candidates (including a former county district judge) Younger advanced to the Republican primary runoff, finishing second behind and ultimately losing in the runoff to former Town Councilman Ben Bumgarner.

=== Greg Abbott child abuse investigation order ===
Following the initial jury ruling, Texas Governor Greg Abbott declared that the Texas Department of Family and Protective Services (DFPS) and the Texas Attorney General’s Office were "looking into" the dispute. In a letter to the state's child welfare agency, Texas First Assistant Attorney General Jeff Mateer claimed their daughter was "in immediate and irrevocable danger" of "permanent and potentially irreversible harm by [her] mother". Angela Hale, then-CEO of Equality Texas said, "We’ve already seen what happens when the state politicizes transgender children: Real harm can be done. Politicians have no business delving into people’s private lives and attempting to harm children."

In February 2022, Abbott issued an order for the Texas DFPS to treat all gender-affirming medical treatments for transgender youth as child abuse. The New York Times noted Younger's case had "paved the way for" this. On March 29, 2024, the Texas Court of Appeals upheld an injunction brought by PFLAG, blocking the DFPS from investigating Texas parents of transgender youth.
