= Andy Hopper (politician) =

American politician

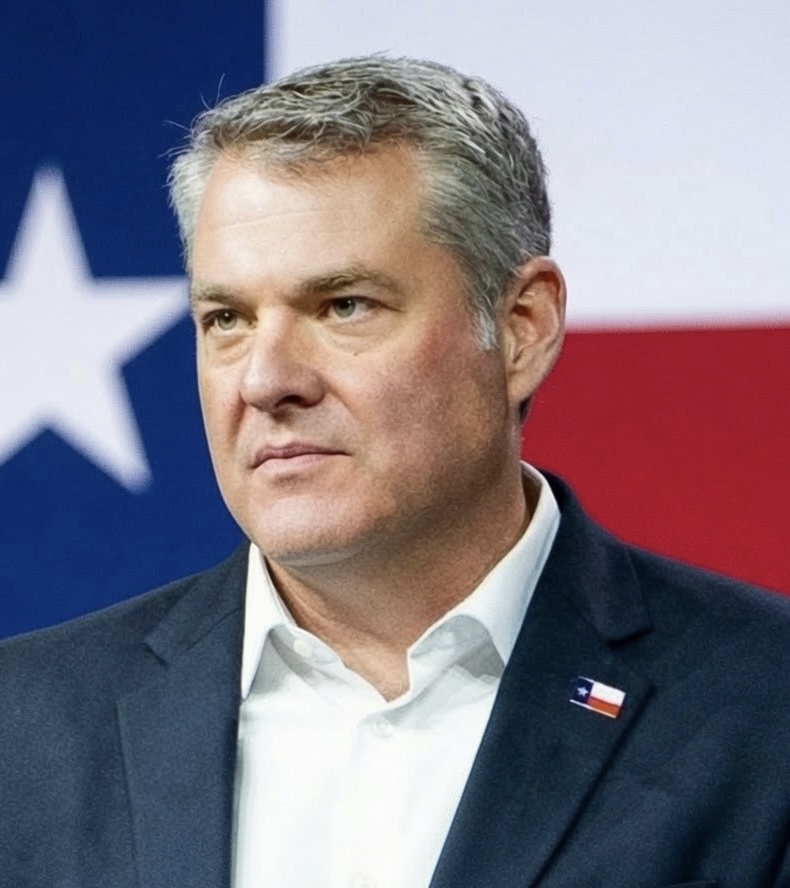
- Hopper in 2026

Member of the Texas House of Representatives from the 64th district
- Incumbent
- Assumed office January 14, 2025
- Preceded by: Lynn Stucky

Personal details
- Born: February 18, 1977 (age 49) Kansas City, Missouri, U.S.
- Party: Republican
- Education: Ohio University (BS); University of North Texas (MS)
- Website: Official website

Andy Hopper (born February 18, 1977) is an American politician serving as a member of the Texas House of Representatives for the 64th district since 2025. He defeated incumbent Lynn Stucky in the Republican primary runoff election in 2024.

== Early life and education ==
Andy Hopper was born in Kansas City, Missouri, on February 18, 1977. He earned his bachelor's degree at Ohio University in 1997 and a graduate degree from the University of North Texas in 2000. He and his wife, Amanda, have three sons and reside in Wise County, Texas. In April 2026, the chairman of the Republican Party of Texas, Abraham George, named Amanda Hopper as his running mate to serve as vice chair of the party. The election took place at the 2026 Texas State Republican Party Convention, from June 11-13, where he was defeated for reelection.

Hopper has served as an adjunct professor at the University of North Texas and has been employed as a software engineer in both the private sector and the defense industry. He has served in the Texas State Guard since 2014, attaining the rank of Chief Warrant Officer, and he also holds a US Patent.

== Career ==
As a freshman member of the House in the 89th Legislative Session, he was appointed to serve on the Agriculture & Livestock committee and the Insurance committee.

Hopper filed House Bill 1982 during his first month in office, which would require approval from the Texas Attorney General and local sheriff for the federal government to execute federal arrest warrants on Texas citizens and granting them a state court hearing before federal custody transfer. Hopper stated that the bill is “in support of President Donald Trump’s executive order regarding the persecution of Americans detained by the federal government after Jan. 6, 2021.”

Hopper also filed HB 2657 which calls for the abolishment of the Texas Education Agency, transferring powers, duties, and employee positions to the state comptroller and the State Board of Education.

== Texas Military Department Awards ==
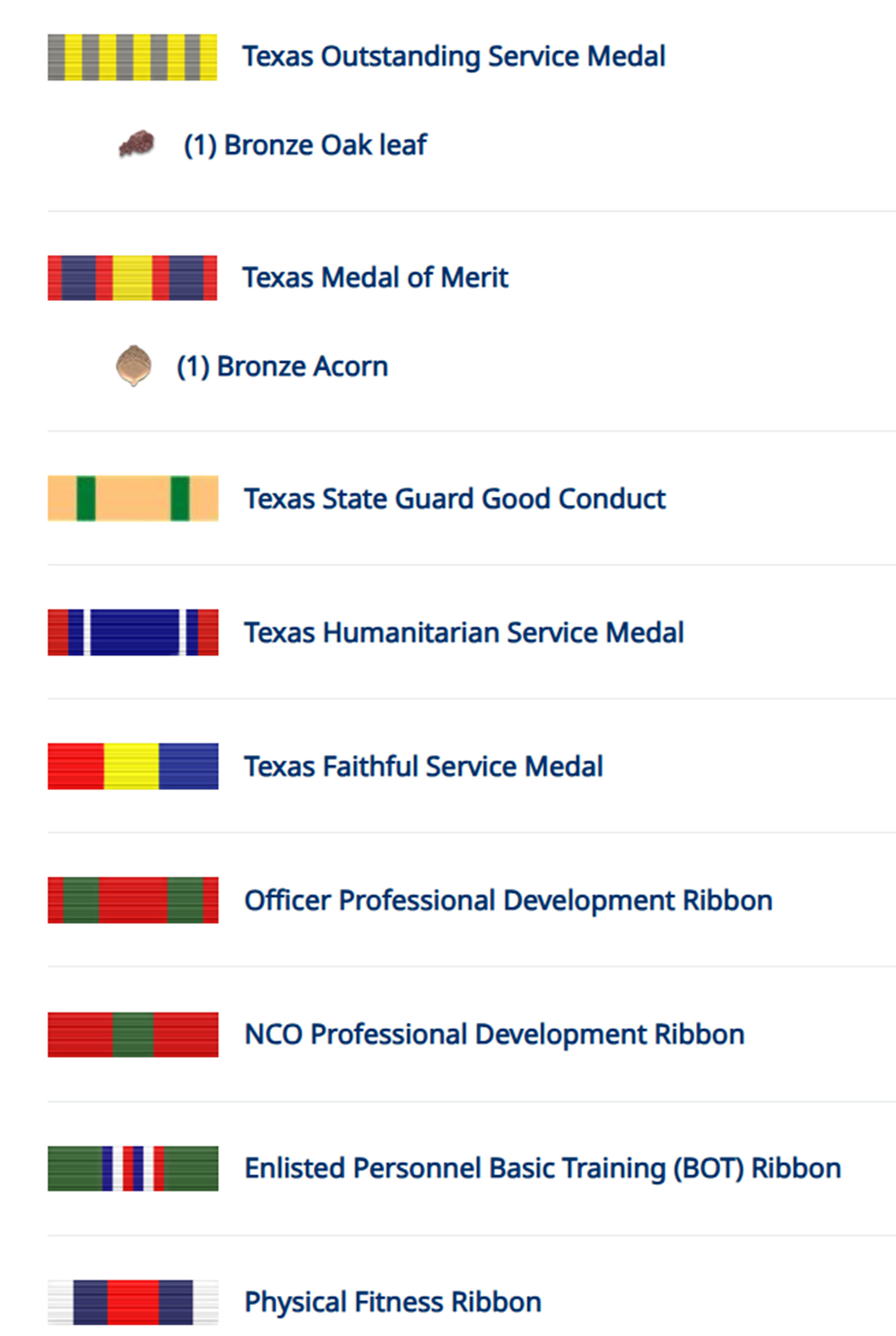
Texas Military Department Awards

1.Texas Outstanding Service Medal (2)

2. Texas Medal of Merit (2)

3. Texas State Guard Good Conduct (3)

4. Texas Humanitarian Service Medal

5. Texas Faithful Service Medal

6. Officer Professional Development Ribbon

7. NCO Professional Development Ribbion

8. Enlisted Personnel Basic Training (BOT) Ribbon

9. Physical Fitness Ribbon
