= Texas's 64th House of Representatives district =

American legislative district

Texas's 64th State House of Representatives district
Representative
Andy Hopper; R–Decatur
- Demographics: 63.3% White; 8.6% Black; 22.1% Hispanic; 3.3% Asian
- Population (2020) • Voting age: 192,862; 153,317

District 64 is a district of the Texas House of Representatives that serves all of Wise County and the northwest portion of Denton County. The current representative for district 64 is Republican Andy Hopper, who succeeded Lynn Stucky on January 14, 2025.

Following the 2020 Census, redistricting took place in 2021. These changes took effect in the 2022 election cycle.

The district contains most of the city of Denton, where most of its population is located. In addition, all of Decatur, Krum, New Fairview, Aurora, Runaway Bay, Alvord, Newark, and Bridgeport call the district home. The district also includes the University of North Texas, Texas Woman's University, and the Denton County campus of North Central Texas College.

Lake Bridgeport is in the far west portion of the district.

US 380 runs horizontally through the entirety of the district. In the eastern portion, I-35 runs vertically through the city of Denton.

== Prior incarnations of District 64 ==
During the 1980s the district was located in West Texas. It is most notable as the home district (1984–1990) of Rick Perry who would later become Governor of Texas.

From 2002 to 2012, and 2012 to 2022, the district was located wholly within Denton County. It was one of three districts serving the county in the latter decade.

== List of representatives ==
Leg.	Representative	Party	Term start	Term end	Counties represented
5th	Charles Edward Travis	Unknown	November 7, 1853	November 5, 1855	Caldwell, Hays
6th	William Wesley Ellison	Unknown	November 5, 1855	November 2, 1857	Caldwell, Hays
7th	Thomas Monroe Hardeman	Unknown	November 2, 1857	November 7, 1859	Caldwell, Hays
8th	John W. Davis	Unknown	November 7, 1859	November 4, 1861	Caldwell, Hays
9th	Jeptha Warren Stell	Unknown	November 4, 1861	April 4, 1862	Gonzales
9th	William H. H. Wade	Unknown	February 2, 1863	November 2, 1863	Gonzales
10th	Lemuel R. Bratton	Unknown	November 2, 1863	August 6, 1866	Gonzales
11th	Robert A. Atkinson	Unknown	August 6, 1866	February 7, 1870	Gonzales
15th	James Van Zandt Hutchins	Democratic	April 18, 1876	January 14, 1879	Caldwell, Guadalupe, Hays
15th	William M. Rust	Democratic	April 18, 1876	January 14, 1879	Caldwell, Guadalupe, Hays
16th	William Franklin Delany	Greenback Party	January 14, 1879	January 11, 1881	Caldwell, Guadalupe, Hays
16th	Stokely Mize Holmes	Unaffiliated	January 14, 1879	January 11, 1881	Caldwell, Guadalupe, Hays
17th	James Gray Storey	Democratic	January 11, 1881	January 9, 1883	Caldwell, Guadalupe, Hays
17th	Martin R. Stringfellow	Democratic	January 11, 1881	January 9, 1883	Caldwell, Guadalupe, Hays
18th	Frederick Joseph Duff	Democratic	January 9, 1883	January 13, 1885	Brazoria, Galveston
19th	Ammon Underwood	Democratic	January 13, 1885	January 11, 1887	Brazoria, Galveston
20th	Benjamin Rush Plumley	Republican	January 11, 1887	December 9, 1887	Brazoria, Galveston
20th	Guy M. Bryan	Democratic	May 2, 1888	January 8, 1889	Brazoria, Galveston
21st	Guy M. Bryan	Democratic	January 8, 1889	January 13, 1891	Brazoria, Galveston
22nd	Walter Gresham	Democratic	January 13, 1891	January 10, 1893	Brazoria, Galveston
23rd	J. W. Alston	Democratic	January 10, 1893	January 8, 1895	Leon, Limestone, Madison, Robertson
24th	John Addison Wayland	Democratic	January 8, 1895	January 12, 1897	Leon, Limestone, Madison, Robertson
25th	L. Travis Dashiell	Democratic	January 12, 1897	January 10, 1899	Leon, Limestone, Madison, Robertson
26th	Henry Ezekial Ellis	Democratic	January 10, 1899	January 8, 1901	Leon, Limestone, Madison, Robertson
27th	Henry Ezekial Ellis	Democratic	January 8, 1901	January 13, 1903	Leon, Limestone, Madison, Robertson
28th	George Stephen Miller	Democratic	January 13, 1903	January 10, 1905	Milam
29th	George Stephen Miller	Democratic	January 10, 1905	January 8, 1907	Milam
30th	Emory Addicus Camp	Democratic	January 8, 1907	January 12, 1909	Milam
31st	Horace Edward Graham	Democratic	January 12, 1909	January 10, 1911	Milam
32nd	Horace Edward Graham	Democratic	January 10, 1911	January 14, 1913	Milam
32nd	Daniel F. Parker	Democratic	January 10, 1911	January 14, 1913	Robertson
33rd	Daniel F. Parker	Democratic	January 14, 1913	January 12, 1915	Robertson
34th	Edmund Anderson Decherd Jr.	Democratic	January 12, 1915	January 9, 1917	Robertson
35th	Frank S. Estes	Democratic	January 9, 1917	January 14, 1919	Robertson
36th	Frank S. Estes	Democratic	January 14, 1919	January 11, 1921	Robertson
37th	Frank S. Estes	Democratic	January 11, 1921	January 9, 1923	Robertson
38th	Isaac W. "Ike" Looney	Democratic	January 9, 1923	October 2, 1923	Milam
39th	Desoto Shelton Hollowell	Democratic	January 13, 1925	December 1, 1925	Milam
39th	Samuel Swain Hefley	Democratic	September 13, 1926	January 11, 1927	Milam
40th	Samuel Swain Hefley	Democratic	January 11, 1927	January 8, 1929	Milam
41st	Samuel Swain Hefley	Democratic	January 8, 1929	January 13, 1931	Milam
42nd	Samuel Swain Hefley	Democratic	January 13, 1931	January 10, 1933	Milam
43rd	Emory Brodnax Camp	Democratic	January 10, 1933	January 8, 1935	Milam
44th	George Mayo Newton	Democratic	January 8, 1935	January 12, 1937	Milam
45th	George Mayo Newton	Democratic	January 12, 1937	January 10, 1939	Milam
46th	Reese Monroe Turner Sr.	Democratic	January 10, 1939	January 14, 1941	Milam
47th	Reese Monroe Turner Sr.	Democratic	January 14, 1941	July 15, 1941	Milam
47th	Albert Nelson Green	Democratic	September 9, 1941	January 12, 1943	Milam
48th	Albert Nelson Green	Democratic	January 12, 1943	January 9, 1945	Milam
49th	Albert Nelson Green	Democratic	January 9, 1945	January 14, 1947	Milam
50th	Albert Nelson Green	Democratic	January 14, 1947	January 11, 1949	Milam
51st	Hubert F. Paschall	Democratic	January 11, 1949	January 9, 1951	Milam
52nd	Haney Max Roark	Democratic	January 9, 1951	January 13, 1953	Milam
53rd	Frank G. Svadlenak	Democratic	January 13, 1953	January 9, 1954	Williamson
53rd	Oswald Henry Schram Jr.	Democratic	March 15, 1954	January 11, 1955	Williamson
54th	Oswald Henry Schram Jr.	Democratic	January 11, 1955	January 8, 1957	Williamson
55th	Oswald Henry Schram Jr.	Democratic	January 8, 1957	January 13, 1959	Williamson
56th	Oswald Henry Schram Jr.	Democratic	January 13, 1959	January 10, 1961	Williamson
57th	Oswald Henry Schram Jr.	Democratic	January 10, 1961	January 8, 1963	Williamson
58th	Ben Barnes	Democratic	January 8, 1963	January 12, 1965	Brown, Coleman Comanche, Runnels
59th	Ben Barnes	Democratic	January 12, 1965	January 10, 1967	Brown, Coleman Comanche, Runnels
60th	Ben Barnes	Democratic	January 10, 1967	January 14, 1969	Brown, Coleman Comanche, Runnels
61st	Lynn Nabers	Democratic	January 14, 1969	January 12, 1971	Brown, Coleman Comanche, Runnels
62nd	Lynn Nabers	Democratic	January 12, 1971	January 9, 1973	Brown, Coleman Comanche, Runnels
63rd	Lawrence Dean Cobb	Democratic	January 9, 1973	January 14, 1975	Dallam, Hansford, Hartley, Hemphill, Hutchinson, Lipscomb, Moore, Ochiltree, Roberts, Sherman
64th	George Robert Close	Republican	January 14, 1975	January 11, 1977	Dallam, Hansford, Hartley, Hemphill, Hutchinson, Lipscomb, Moore, Ochiltree, Roberts, Sherman
65th	George Robert Close	Republican	January 11, 1977	January 9, 1979	Dallam, Hansford, Hartley, Hemphill, Hutchinson, Lipscomb, Moore, Ochiltree, Roberts, Sherman
66th	George Robert Close	Republican	January 9, 1971	January 13, 1981	Dallam, Hansford, Hartley, Hemphill, Hutchinson, Lipscomb, Moore, Ochiltree, Roberts, Sherman
67th	John Wilson Buchanan	Democratic	January 13, 1981	January 11, 1983	Dallam, Hansford, Hartley, Hemphill, Hutchinson, Lipscomb, Moore, Ochiltree, Roberts, Sherman
68th	Joe Hanna	Democratic	January 11, 1983	January 8, 1985	Callahan, Haskell, Hood, Palo Pinto, Shackelford, Stephens, Throckmorton, Young
69th	Rick Perry	Democratic	January 8, 1985	January 13, 1987	Callahan, Haskell, Hood, Palo Pinto, Shackelford, Stephens, Throckmorton, Young
70th	Rick Perry	Democratic	January 13, 1987	January 10, 1989	Callahan, Haskell, Hood, Palo Pinto, Shackelford, Stephens, Throckmorton, Young
71st	Rick Perry	Democratic	January 10, 1989	January 8, 1991	Callahan, Haskell, Hood, Palo Pinto, Shackelford, Stephens, Throckmorton, Young
72nd	John R. Cook	Democratic	January 8, 1991	January 12, 1993	Callahan, Haskell, Hood, Palo Pinto, Shackelford, Stephens, Throckmorton, Young
73rd	James N. "Jim" Horn	Republican	January 12, 1993	January 10, 1995	Denton
74th	James N. "Jim" Horn	Republican	January 10, 1995	January 14, 1997	Denton
75th	James N. "Jim" Horn	Republican	January 14, 1997	January 12, 1999	Denton
76th	Ronny Wayne Crownover	Republican	January 12, 1999	March 26, 2000	Denton
76th	Myra Crownover	Republican	May 10, 2000	January 9, 2001	Denton
77th	Myra Crownover	Republican	January 9, 2001	January 14, 2003	Denton
78th	Myra Crownover	Republican	January 14, 2003	January 11, 2005	Denton
79th	Myra Crownover	Republican	January 11, 2005	January 9, 2007	Denton
80th	Myra Crownover	Republican	January 9, 2007	January 13, 2009	Denton
81st	Myra Crownover	Republican	January 13, 2009	January 11, 2011	Denton
82nd	Myra Crownover	Republican	January 11, 2013	January 8, 2013	Denton
83rd	Myra Crownover	Republican	January 8, 2013	January 13, 2015	Denton
84th	Myra Crownover	Republican	January 13, 2015	January 10, 2017	Denton
85th	Lynn Stucky	Republican	January 10, 2017	January 8, 2019	Denton
86th	Lynn Stucky	Republican	January 8, 2019	January 12, 2021	Denton
87th	Lynn Stucky	Republican	January 12, 2021	January 10, 2023	Denton
88th	Lynn Stucky	Republican	January 10, 2023	January 14, 2025	Most of Denton, all of Wise
89th	Andy Hopper	Republican	January 14, 2025	January 12, 2027	Most of Denton, all of Wise
