= Sanger, Texas =

- City
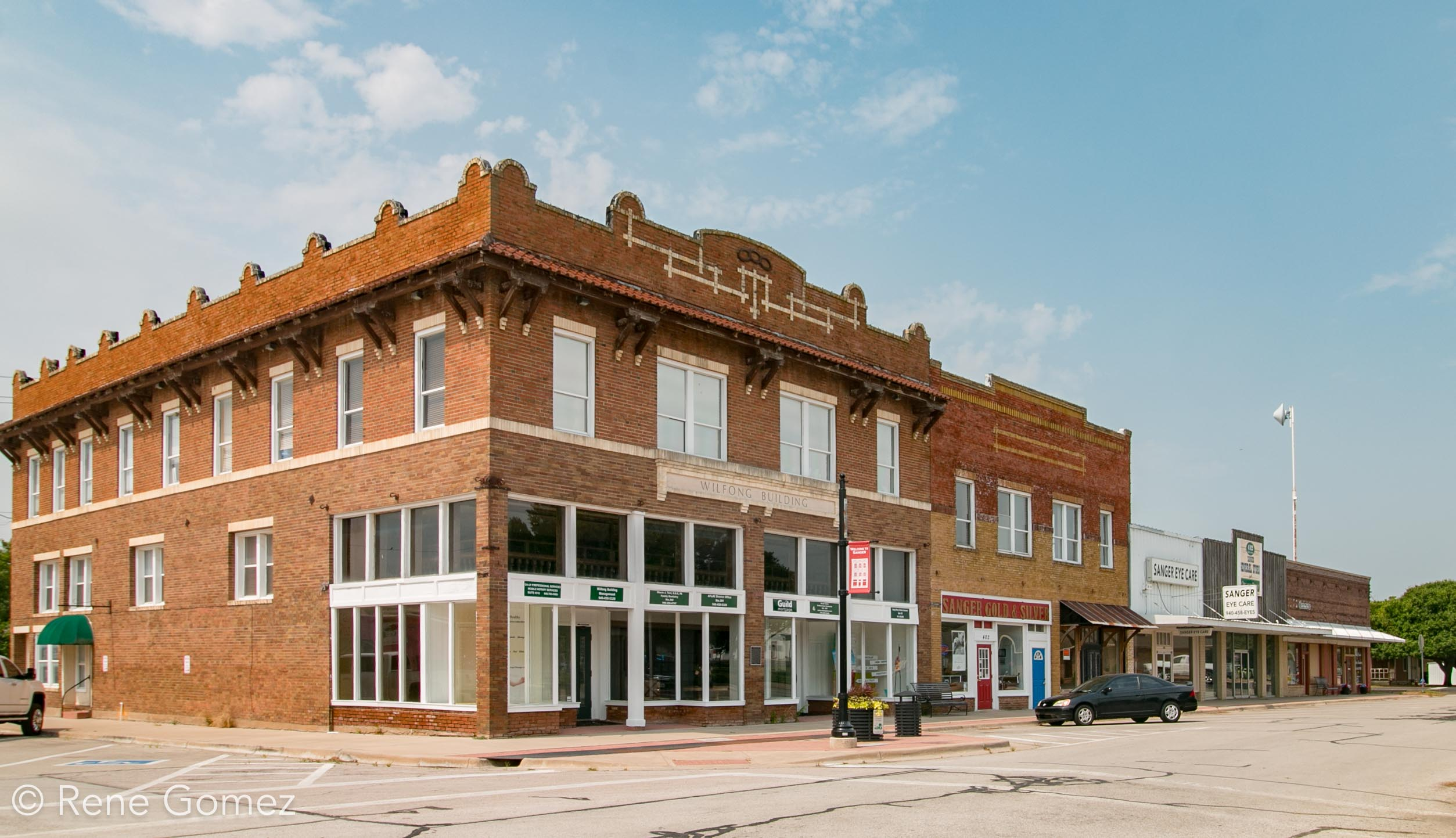

- Location of Sanger in Denton County, Texas
- Coordinates: 33°21′47″N 97°10′34″W
- Country: United States
- State: Texas
- County: Denton

Government
  - Type: Council-manager

Area
  - Total: 11.81 sq mi (30.59 km^{2})
  - Land: 11.76 sq mi (30.46 km^{2})
  - Water: 0.054 sq mi (0.14 km^{2})
- Elevation: 673 ft (205 m)

Population (2020)
  - Total: 8,839
  - Estimate (2025): 10,238
  - Density: 748.4/sq mi (288.94/km^{2})
- Time zone: UTC-6 (Central (CST))
  - Summer (DST): UTC-5 (CDT)
- ZIP code: 76266
- Area code: 940
- FIPS code: 48-65408
- GNIS feature ID: 2411812
- Website: sangertexas.org

Sanger is a city in Denton County, Texas, United States and is part of the Greater Dallas metropolitan area. As of the 2020 census, the population of the city was 8,839.

== Geography ==
Sanger is located at 33°21′47″N 97°10′34″W (33.363068, –97.176212). According to the United States Census Bureau, the city has a total area of 10.9 square miles (28.3 km^{2}), of which 0.04 square miles (0.1 km^{2}), or 0.45%, is covered by water.

The climate in this area is characterized by hot, humid summers and generally mild to cool winters. According to the Köppen climate classification, Sanger has a humid subtropical climate, Cfa on climate maps.

== Demographics ==
Historical population
Census	Pop.	Note	%±
1920	1,204		—
1930	1,119		−7.1%
1940	1,000		−10.6%
1950	1,170		17.0%
1960	1,190		1.7%
1970	1,603		34.7%
1980	2,574		60.6%
1990	3,508		36.3%
2000	4,534		29.2%
2010	6,916		52.5%
2020	8,839		27.8%
2025 (est.)	10,238		15.8%
U.S. Decennial Census

=== 2020 census ===
As of the 2020 census, Sanger had a population of 8,839. The median age was 32.9 years. 27.9% of residents were under the age of 18 and 10.5% of residents were 65 years of age or older. For every 100 females there were 98.8 males, and for every 100 females age 18 and over there were 95.7 males age 18 and over.

93.7% of residents lived in urban areas, while 6.3% lived in rural areas.

There were 3,157 households in Sanger, of which 42.1% had children under the age of 18 living in them. Of all households, 53.3% were married-couple households, 16.1% were households with a male householder and no spouse or partner present, and 22.5% were households with a female householder and no spouse or partner present. About 21.2% of all households were made up of individuals and 6.9% had someone living alone who was 65 years of age or older; the census counted 2,055 families in the city.

There were 3,352 housing units, of which 5.8% were vacant. The homeowner vacancy rate was 1.9% and the rental vacancy rate was 8.0%.

Racial composition as of the 2020 census
Race	Number	Percent
White	6,654	75.3%
Black or African American	344	3.9%
American Indian and Alaska Native	67	0.8%
Asian	80	0.9%
Native Hawaiian and Other Pacific Islander	5	0.1%
Some other race	558	6.3%
Two or more races	1,131	12.8%
Hispanic or Latino (of any race)	1,849	20.9%

Note: NH = Non-Hispanic. The US Census treats Hispanic/Latino as an ethnic category. This table excludes Latinos from the racial categories and assigns them to a separate category. Hispanics/Latinos can be of any race.

=== 2010 census ===
The population in 1980 was 2,574, an increase of 60.6% since 1970. In 1990, the population was 3,508, and the city's population in 2010 was 6,916.

== Economy ==
In 2022, the community did not have its own grocery store. It previously did, but after it closed, Sanger Independent School District created a charity grocery store for its own students. In December 2025, A Tom Thumb was opened.

== Education ==
Public education in Sanger is run under the Sanger Independent School District, an independent government. The superintendent of the Sanger public schools is Dr. Sandra McCoy-Jackson. Eight different schools are in Sanger, Texas: Sanger High School, Linda Tutt High School, Sanger Middle School, Sanger 6th Grade Campus, Clear Creek Intermediate School, Butterfield Elementary School, Chisholm Trail Elementary, and Tenderfoot Child Development Center. The new facilities in the Sanger Independent School district are one of the high schools and the new elementary school. The City of Sanger considers the school district a partner of the cities and they work very closely with one another. Sanger ISD has recently introduced a district wide initiative to integrate instructional technology with effective teaching practices. They currently have a 1:1 student technology lending program for grades 8–12 and have increased available technology in all grades across the district.

In 2022, about 20% of the residents in the town had a bachelor's degree.

== Politics ==
In 2022, the majority of residents supported the Republican Party.

== Notable people ==
- Dane Evans, American professional Canadian football quarterback for the Hamilton Tiger-Cats
- James F. Hollingsworth, United States Army lieutenant general – born in Sanger, Texas
- Ty O'Neal, American actor – currently lives in Sanger
- Jay Ramsey, American singer, songwriter, musician, and performer – grew up in Sanger
- Lynn Stucky, veterinarian and Republican member of the Texas House of Representatives
- Larry Tidwell, American college basketball coach – born in Sanger, Texas
- Marijohn Wilkin, American songwriter, famous in country music
