= Sanger High School (Texas) =

Coordinates: 33.3696°N 97.1602°W

Location
- 3001 FM 455; Sanger, Texas 76266; United States

Information
- School type: Public high school
- School district: Sanger Independent School District
- Principal: Carly Sperry
- Associate principal: Jona Gillum
- Staff: 62.50 (FTE)
- Grades: 9–12
- Enrollment: 824 (2023–2024)
- Student to teacher ratio: 13.18
- Colors: Purple and gold
- Athletics conference: UIL Class AAAA
- Mascot: Indians
- Website: shs.sangerisd.net

Sanger High School is a public high school located in Sanger, Texas, in Denton County, United States. It is classified as a 4A school by the University Interscholastic League. It is a part of the Sanger Independent School District located in north central Denton County. The boundary of the school district includes Sanger and portions of Denton.

In 2015, the school was rated "Met Standard" by the Texas Education Agency.

Athletic activities at the school include footballs, volleyball, cross country, track, softball, basketball, powerlifting, baseball, and tennis. In 2001, Sanger won the 3A state championship in softball. CFL player Dane Evans went to Sanger High School, where he was quarterback of the football team.

As of October 2025, construction on a new Sanger High School building and campus extension has been finished, with the former building at 100 Indian Lane now being used as a middle school, which currently serves grades 6-8 of Sanger Independent School District
