= Shady Shores, Texas =

- Town
- Location of Shady Shores in Denton County, Texas
- Coordinates: 33°09′47″N 97°02′24″W
- Country: United States
- State: Texas
- County: Denton

Area
  - Total: 3.23 sq mi (8.36 km^{2})
  - Land: 3.22 sq mi (8.34 km^{2})
  - Water: 0.0077 sq mi (0.02 km^{2})
- Elevation: 564 ft (172 m)

Population (2020)
  - Total: 2,764
  - Density: 858/sq mi (331/km^{2})
- Time zone: UTC-6 (Central (CST))
  - Summer (DST): UTC-5 (CDT)
- ZIP codes: 76205, 76208
- Area code: 940
- FIPS code: 48-67100
- GNIS feature ID: 2413275
- Website: http://www.shady-shores.com/

Shady Shores is a town in Denton County, Texas, United States. The population was 2,764 at the 2020 census. It is also one of four communities in the Lake Cities.

== History ==
There was a Shady Shores Independent School in 1912. In the mid-1920s, John William Franck, a Dallas contractor, built a fishing camp with about ten wood-shingle cabins on the northern shores of Lake Dallas. He had this in mind as a weekend retreat for Dallas residents. In the 1930s, many of the fishing camps were torn down and replaced by permanent homes, a number of which are still standing.

The community thrived, and in 1932, a nearby subdivision called Shady Shores began construction. The lake was enlarged in the late 1950s, becoming what is now known as Lewisville Lake. In 1960, the city leaders decided to incorporate – mostly to escape being annexed by Denton – and the subdivision's name became the name of a newly formed town. Up until 2000, when tax collection began, money for road repairs and police and fire protection came from fees from building permits, franchise fees, pancake suppers and donations from the residents.

== Geography ==
According to the United States Census Bureau, the town has a total area of 2.9 square miles (7.5 km^{2}), of which 2.9 square miles (7.5 km^{2}) is land and 0.34% is water.

== Demographics ==
Historical population
Census	Pop.	Note	%±
1970	543		—
1980	813		49.7%
1990	1,045		28.5%
2000	1,461		39.8%
2010	2,612		78.8%
2020	2,764		5.8%
2023 (est.)	2,957	▲	7.0%
U.S. Decennial Census; 2020 Census

As of the census of 2000, there were 1,461 people, 532 households, and 403 families residing in the town. The population density was 504.1 inhabitants per square mile (194.6/km^{2}). There were 592 housing units at an average density of 204.3 per square mile (78.9/km^{2}). The racial makeup of the town was 96.58% White, 0.14% African American, 0.48% Native American, 0.21% Asian, 0.07% Pacific Islander, 1.57% from other races, and 0.96% from two or more races. Hispanic or Latino of any race were 6.71% of the population.

There were 532 households, out of which 40.0% had children under the age of 18 living with them, 65.4% were married couples living together, 6.2% had a female householder with no husband present, and 24.2% were non-families. 19.5% of all households were made up of individuals, and 4.1% had someone living alone who was 65 years of age or older. The average household size was 2.75 and the average family size was 3.19.

In the town, the population was spread out, with 28.0% under the age of 18, 6.9% from 18 to 24, 34.2% from 25 to 44, 24.4% from 45 to 64, and 6.5% who were 65 years of age or older. The median age was 37 years. For every 100 females, there were 109.9 males. For every 100 females age 18 and over, there were 107.5 males.

The median income for a household in the town was $61,667, and the median income for a family was $68,750. Males had a median income of $45,167 versus $31,250 for females. The per capita income for the town was $25,951. About 2.1% of families and 3.1% of the population were below the poverty line, including 1.4% of those under age 18 and 9.0% of those age 65 or over.

== Education ==
The Town of Shady Shores is served mostly by Denton ISD, with a small subdivision off Dobbs Road and the back half of the Cielo Ranch subdivision going to Lake Dallas ISD.

The Denton ISD portion is zoned to Stephens Elementary, Bettye Myers Middle School, and Ryan High School.

The Lake Dallas ISD subdivision follows the Shady Shores Elementary, Lake Dallas Middle and Lake Dallas High feeder.

The majority of Denton County, Shady Shores included, is in the boundary of North Central Texas College.
