= Lake Dallas High School =

Coordinates: 33.1328°N 97.0618°W

Location
- 3016 Parkridge Dr. Corinth, Texas 76210; United States

Information
- School type: Public high school
- School district: Lake Dallas Independent School District
- Teaching staff: 82.46 (FTE)
- Grades: 9-12
- Enrollment: 1,283 (2024-2025)
- Student to teacher ratio: 15.56
- Colors: Green, grey, black and white
- Athletics conference: UIL Class 4A
- Mascot: Falcons/Lady Falcons
- Website: Lake Dallas High School

Lake Dallas High School is a public high school located in the city of Corinth, Texas. It is classified as a 4A school by the UIL. It is part of the Lake Dallas Independent School District located in central Denton County. In 2015, the school was rated "Met Standard" by the Texas Education Agency.

It includes all of Lake Dallas, almost all of the town of Hickory Creek, and sections of Corinth and Shady Shores.

== Athletics ==
The Lake Dallas Falcons compete in these sports

Volleyball, Cross Country, Football, Basketball, Powerlifting, Soccer, Golf, Tennis, Track, Baseball & Softball

Basketball Team: In 1991 the boys varsity team made the "Elite 8" in the UIL 3A playoffs.

Baseball Team: In 2016 reached the state quarter-finals “Elite 8” in the UIL 5A playoffs. In 2019 reached the “Sweet 16” in the UIL 5A playoffs.

Football Team: In 2015 reached the state semi-finals “Final Four” in the UIL 5A playoffs.

Soccer: In 2026, the boys varsity soccer team reached the UIL 4A state championship game.

=== State titles ===
- One Act Play
  - 1998(3A)

== Notable people ==
- Dusty Dvoracek, former nose guard for the Chicago Bears, commentator for ESPN College Football (University of Oklahoma)
- James Franklin, former quarterback for the Toronto Argonauts (University of Missouri)
- Josh Jackson, former cornerback for the Green Bay Packers (University of Iowa)
- Kobee Minor, cornerback for the New England Patriots (University of Memphis)
- Brendan Sorsby, quarterback
- Josiah Tauaefa, former linebacker for the New York Giants (University of Texas-San Antonio)
- Daryl Williams, former offensive tackle for the Carolina Panthers (University of Oklahoma)
