= Sanger Independent School District =

School district in Texas, United States

Address
- 601 Elm Street Sanger, TX, USA ESC Region 11
- Coordinates: 33°21′48″N 97°10′37″W

District information
- Type: Independent School District
- Grades: PK–12
- Established: July 8, 1898; 128 years ago
- Superintendent: Dr. Tommy Hunter
- Governing agency: Texas Education Agency
- Schools: 6
- NCES District ID: 4839180

Students and staff
- Students: 2,959 (2025–2026)
- Athletic conference: UIL Class AAAA
- District mascot: Indians
- Colors: Purple; Gold

Other information
- Website: www.sangerisd.net

Sanger Independent School District is a public school district headquartered in Sanger, Texas, United States. Covering approximately 103 square miles in Denton County, the district serves most of Sanger, portions of Denton, the unincorporated community of Bolivar, and other unincorporated land.

As of 2026, Sanger ISD operates 6 schools, including 1 high school, 1 middle school, and 3 elementary schools, and 1 alternative high school. The district most recently received a "B" rating from the Texas Education Agency (TEA).

== Schools ==
| Name | Grades | Established | Additional information |
|---|---|---|---|
| Sanger High School | 9-12 | 1898 | |
| Sanger Middle School | 6-8 | | |
| Butterfield Elementary School | 1-5 | | |
| Clear Creek Elementary School | 1-5 | 1998 | |
| Chisholm Trail Elementary School | PK-K | 1985 | |
| Linda Tutt Learning Center | 9-12 | | Alternative education |

Alternative school

- Linda Tutt Learning Center / Linda Tutt High School (alternative, for grades 9-12)
  - Tutt High has a grocery store, jointly established by Albertsons, First Refuge Ministries, and Texas Health Resources, which accepts documentation of charitable acts by students, in lieu of cash, as a form of payment. Tutt also has a "Social Emotional Learning & Behavior" program for students with severe behavioral or mental health issues. Other school districts send students to Tutt for this program. Various non-profit organizations, some religious, fund the Linda Tutt initiatives, with some coming in the form of grants.

== School District Board ==
The school district's board of trustees is made up of eight members.

Board trustees

- Jimmy Howard
  - Place 1, Board Trustee
- Ann Marie Afflerbach
  - Place 2, Board Secretary
- Sarah York
  - Place 3, Vice-President
- Ken Scribner
  - Place 4, Board President
- Lisa Cody
  - Place 5, Board Trustee
- Mitch Hammonds
  - Place 6, Board Trustee
- Zach Thompson
  - Place 7, Board Trustee
- Dr. Tommy Hunter
  - Superintendent of Schools
