= Hickory Creek, Texas =

- Town
- Seal

- Location of Hickory Creek in Denton County, Texas
- Coordinates: 33°06′40″N 97°01′50″W
- Country: United States
- State: Texas
- County: Denton

Government
  - Type: General law town

Area
  - Total: 4.78 sq mi (12.38 km^{2})
  - Land: 4.69 sq mi (12.14 km^{2})
  - Water: 0.093 sq mi (0.24 km^{2})
- Elevation: 548 ft (167 m)

Population (2020)
  - Total: 4,718
  - Density: 1,007/sq mi (388.6/km^{2})
- Time zone: UTC-6 (Central (CST))
  - Summer (DST): UTC-5 (CDT)
- ZIP Code: 75065
- FIPS code: 48-33476
- GNIS feature ID: 2412749
- Website: www.hickorycreek-tx.gov

Hickory Creek is a town in Denton County, Texas, United States, located 30 miles (48 km) north of downtown Dallas. The population of Hickory Creek has grown from 219 at its incorporation in 1963 to 4,718 at the 2020 census. It is also one of the four communities in the Lake Cities.

Hickory Creek was recognized by Tree City USA in August 2008.

== Geography ==
According to the United States Census Bureau, the town has a total area of 4.6 square miles (12 km^{2}), of which 4.5 square miles (12 km^{2}) is land and 0.1 square miles (0.26 km^{2}), or 1.30%, is water.

== Demographics ==
Historical population
Census	Pop.	Note	%±
1970	218		—
1980	1,422		552.3%
1990	1,893		33.1%
2000	2,078		9.8%
2010	3,247		56.3%
2020	4,718		45.3%
2023 (est.)	5,668	▲	20.1%
U.S. Decennial Census; 2020 Census

=== 2020 census ===
As of the 2020 census, Hickory Creek had a population of 4,718. The median age was 44.6 years. 19.8% of residents were under the age of 18 and 15.6% of residents were 65 years of age or older. For every 100 females there were 98.3 males, and for every 100 females age 18 and over there were 96.1 males age 18 and over.

87.5% of residents lived in urban areas, while 12.5% lived in rural areas.

There were 1,791 households in Hickory Creek, of which 31.2% had children under the age of 18 living in them. Of all households, 65.6% were married-couple households, 13.0% were households with a male householder and no spouse or partner present, and 17.5% were households with a female householder and no spouse or partner present. About 17.2% of all households were made up of individuals and 7.1% had someone living alone who was 65 years of age or older.

There were 1,859 housing units, of which 3.7% were vacant. The homeowner vacancy rate was 1.3% and the rental vacancy rate was 3.8%.

Racial composition as of the 2020 census
Race	Number	Percent
White	3,490	74.0%
Black or African American	222	4.7%
American Indian and Alaska Native	42	0.9%
Asian	215	4.6%
Native Hawaiian and Other Pacific Islander	2	0.0%
Some other race	214	4.5%
Two or more races	533	11.3%
Hispanic or Latino (of any race)	728	15.4%

=== 2000 census ===
As of the census of 2000, there were 2,078 people, 776 households, and 622 families residing in the town. The population density was 458.1 inhabitants per square mile (176.9/km^{2}). There were 808 housing units at an average density of 178.1 per square mile (68.8/km^{2}). The racial makeup of the town was 93.46% White, 1.20% African American, 0.72% Native American, 0.72% Asian, 1.83% from other races, and 2.07% from two or more races. Hispanic or Latino of any race were 5.68% of the population.

There were 776 households, out of which 33.5% had children under the age of 18 living with them, 68.4% were married couples living together, 8.2% had a female householder with no husband present, and 19.8% were non-families. 15.2% of all households were made up of individuals, and 3.1% had someone living alone who was 65 years of age or older. The average household size was 2.68 and the average family size was 2.99.

In the town, the population was spread out, with 24.4% under the age of 18, 6.4% from 18 to 24, 30.5% from 25 to 44, 31.2% from 45 to 64, and 7.6% who were 65 years of age or older. The median age was 40 years. For every 100 females, there were 101.4 males. For every 100 females age 18 and over, there were 99.0 males.

The median income for a household in the town was $69,313, and the median income for a family was $74,107. Males had a median income of $45,885 versus $36,103 for females. The per capita income for the town was $31,683. About 3.3% of families and 4.1% of the population were below the poverty line, including 5.6% of those under age 18 and 4.0% of those age 65 or over.

== Education ==
Almost all of the Town of Hickory Creek is served by the Lake Dallas Independent School District. A small portion is in the Lewisville Independent School District; that portion consists solely of a local park with no permanent residents.

Most of Hickory Creek is zoned to Lake Dallas Elementary School while some of it is zoned to Corinth Elementary School. All parts in Lake Dallas ISD are zoned to Lake Dallas Middle School and Lake Dallas High School.

== See also ==
- Champ d'Or Estate
