= Corinth, Texas =

- City
- Flag
- Motto: Gateway to Success
- Location of Corinth in Denton County, Texas
- Coordinates: 33°8′38″N 97°4′20″W
- Country: United States
- State: Texas
- County: Denton
- Established: 1909

Government
  - Type: Council-manager
  - City Council: Mayor

Area
  - Total: 7.83 sq mi (20.27 km^{2})
  - Land: 7.77 sq mi (20.12 km^{2})
  - Water: 0.058 sq mi (0.15 km^{2})
- Elevation: 620 ft (190 m)

Population (2020)
  - Total: 22,634
  - Density: 2,844.1/sq mi (1,098.13/km^{2})
- Time zone: UTC-6 (Central (CST))
  - Summer (DST): UTC-5 (CDT)
- ZIP codes: 76208, 76210
- Area code: 940
- FIPS code: 48-16696
- GNIS feature ID: 2410229
- Website: www.corinthtx.gov

Corinth (/kərˈɪnθ/ kər-INTH) is a city in Denton County, Texas, United States; it is a part of the Dallas-Fort Worth metroplex. Its population was 22,634 at the 2020 census.

== Geography ==
Corinth is located at 33°8′38″N 97°4′20″W (33.143952, –97.072194). According to the United States Census Bureau, the city has a total area of 7.9 sq mi (20 km^{2}), of which 0.1 sq mi (0.26 km^{2}), or 0.63%, is covered by water.

== Demographics ==
Historical population
Census	Pop.	Note	%±
1970	461		—
1980	1,264		174.2%
1990	3,944		212.0%
2000	11,325		187.1%
2010	19,935		76.0%
2020	22,634		13.5%
2023 (est.)	23,707		4.7%
U.S. Decennial Census

As of the 2020 census, 22,634 people, 7,986 households and 5,965 families were residing in the city; the median age was 38.5 years, with 24.3% of residents under 18 and 12.4% were 65 or older. For every 100 females, there were 97.7 males, and for every 100 females 18 and over, there were 92.7 males 18 and over.

Of the 7,986 households, 37.9% had children under 18 living in them, 63.9% were married-couple households, 12.3% were households with a male householder and no spouse or partner present, and 19.0% were households with a female householder and no spouse or partner present. About 17.1% of all households were made up of individuals, and 6.4% had someone living alone who was 65 or older.

The city had 8,176 housing units, of which 2.3% were vacant. Among occupied housing units, 76.8% were owner-occupied and 23.2% were renter-occupied. The homeowner vacancy rate was 0.6% and the rental vacancy rate was 5.7%.

About 99.7% of residents lived in urban areas, while 0.3% lived in rural areas.

=== Racial and ethnic composition ===
Racial composition as of the 2020 census
Race	Number	Percent
White	15,908	70.3%
Black or African American	1,513	6.7%
American Indian and Alaska Native	185	0.8%
Asian	956	4.2%
Native Hawaiian and other Pacific Islander	12	0.1%
Some other race	1,037	4.6%
Two or more races	3,023	13.4%
Hispanic or Latino (of any race)	3,778	16.7%

=== 2010 census ===
At the 2010 census, 19,935 people were living in the city. The population density was 2,523.4 people/sq mi (977.2/km^{2}). The 7,138 housing units had an average density of 903.5/sq mi (349.9/km^{2}).

In 2010, the racial makeup of the city was 84.7% White, 5.7% African American, 0.8% Native American, 2.7% Asian, 0.05% Pacific Islander, 3.2% some other race, and 2.9% from two or more races. Hispanics or Latinos of any race were 11.8%.

=== Income and poverty estimates ===
According to a 2007 estimate, the median household income was $95,967 and the median family income was $96,375. Males had a median income of $52,362 versus $35,089 for females. The per capita income for the city was $30,492. About 1.0% of families and 1.6% of the population were below the poverty line, including 1.6% of those under 18 and 2.0% of those 65 or over. At the 2020 American Community Survey, the median household income increased to $104,239 with a mean of $122,814.

== Education ==
=== Public schools ===
The city of Corinth is split between Lake Dallas Independent School District (ISD) and Denton Independent School District.

Central/eastern Corinth is in Lake Dallas ISD, with different portions zoned to Corinth Elementary and Shady Shores Elementary. Students in all of Lake Dallas ISD then move up to Lake Dallas Middle and Lake Dallas High.

West and north Corinth are zoned for Denton ISD. West Corinth follows the Hawk Elementary School/Crownover Middle School/John H. Guyer High School feeder (a small section of streets around State School Rd feed into Nelson Elementary instead of Hawk Elementary). North Corinth follows the Stephens Elementary-Myers Middle-Billy Ryan High School feeder pattern.

=== Colleges and universities ===
Corinth is home to one of two branch campuses of North Central Texas College in Denton County (the other being in Flower Mound).

The majority of Denton County, Corinth included, is in the boundary of North Central Texas College.

== Notable people ==
- Dusty Dvoracek, 2001, former Chicago Bears nose tackle
- Josh Jackson, 2015, cornerback for the Green Bay Packers
- Chuck Pierce, founder of Glory of Zion International (independent mega-church).
