= 2022 Texas House of Representatives election =

- November 8, 2022

All 150 seats in the Texas House of Representatives 76 seats needed for a majority
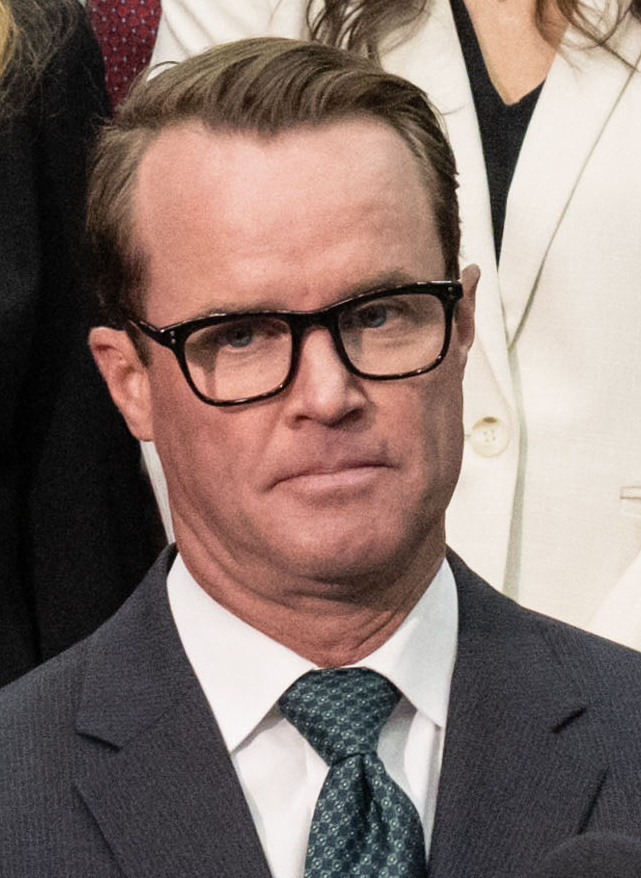

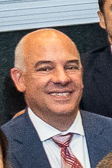
	Majority party	Minority party
Leader	Dade Phelan	Chris Turner (retired as leader)
Party	Republican	Democratic
Leader's seat	21st	101st
Last election	83 seats, 54.92%	67 seats, 43.56%
Seats before	85	65
Seats after	86	64
Seat change	▲1	▼1
Popular vote	2,612,097	2,308,570
Percentage	51.69%	45.68%
Swing	▼3.23%	▲2.12%
- Republican hold Republican gain Democratic hold Democratic gain Republican: 50–60% 60–70% 70–80% 80–90% >90% Democratic: 50–60% 60–70% 70–80% 80–90% >90%
Speaker before election
Dade Phelan
Republican
Speaker
Dade Phelan
Republican

The 2022 Texas House of Representatives elections were held on November 8, 2022, to elect representatives from all 150 House of Representatives districts across the U.S. state of Texas. They were held alongside numerous other federal, state, and local elections, including the 2022 Texas State Senate election. The winners of this election served in the 88th Texas Legislature, with seats apportioned according to the 2020 United States census.

== Background ==
Democrats made major inroads in the Texas House of Representatives in 2018, especially in suburban areas; however, in 2020, Republicans maintained control of the Texas House of Representatives by an 83–67 margin. Republicans had controlled the chamber since the 2002 election.

This election was the first election held after the 2020 United States redistricting cycle.

In July 2021, the majority of Democratic representatives broke quorum during a special legislative session in protest of a controversial Republican-backed voting restrictions bill.

On November 2, 2021, Republican John Lujan won a special election in District 118, flipping it.

On November 15, 2021, Democratic representative Ryan Guillen announced he was changing his party affiliation to Republican. Guillen was the only Democrat in the state house to vote in favor of the Republicans' voting and transgender athlete laws.

This left the partisan balance at 85 Republicans and 65 Democrats going into the 2022 elections. Democrats would have needed to flip 11 seats in order to claim control of the chamber from Republicans.

== Redistricting ==
Following the 2020 United States census, the Texas Legislature underwent its decennial redistricting. Texas House of Representatives districts follow the "county line rule," effectively granting individual counties delegations of state house seats based on their population. The census found that Texas had a population of 29,145,505 in 2020, giving each district an "ideal population" of 194,303 people. In 2010, the "ideal population for a district" was 167,637 people. Counties with at least this number of people must fully contain at least one state house district. Counties with sufficient population for two or more districts must be divided into that number of districts. Should a county have sufficient population for one or more district plus a fraction of another, one district from another county may extend into it to represent the remaining population. District delegations for counties with at least one district changed as follows following the 2020 Census:

County	2010 pop.	Seats	Partial	2020 pop.	Seats	Partial	+/– W	+/– P
Bell County	310,235	1	Yes	370,647	1	Yes	Steady	Steady
Bexar County	1,714,773	10	No	2,009,324	10	No	Steady	Steady
Brazoria County	313,166	1	Yes	372,031	2	Yes	▲1	Steady
Brazos County	194,851	1	Yes	233,849	1	Yes	Steady	Steady
Cameron County	406,220	2	Yes	421,017	1	Two*	▼1	▲
Collin County	782,341	4	Yes	1,064,465	5	Yes	▲1	Steady
Dallas County	2,368,139	14	No	2,613,539	14	No	Steady	Steady
Denton County	662,614	4	No	906,422	4	Yes	Steady	Steady
El Paso County	800,647	5	No	865,657	4	Yes	▼1	▲
Ellis County	149,610	0	Yes	192,455	1	No	▲1	▼
Fort Bend County	585,375	3	Yes	822,779	4	Yes	▲1	Steady
Galveston County	291,309	1	Yes	350,682	1	Yes	Steady	Steady
Harris County	4,092,459	24	No	4,731,145	24	No	Steady	Steady
Hays County	157,127	0	Yes	241,067	1	Yes	▲1	Steady
Hidalgo County	774,769	4	Yes	870,781	4	Yes	Steady	Steady
Jefferson County	252,273	1	Yes	256,526	1	Yes	Steady	Steady
Lubbock County	278,831	1	Yes	310,639	1	Yes	Steady	Steady
McLennan County	234,906	1	Yes	260,579	1	Yes	Steady	Steady
Montgomery County	455,746	2	Yes	620,443	3	Yes	▲1	Steady
Nueces County	340,223	2	No	353,178	1	Yes	▼1	▲
Smith County	209,714	1	Yes	233,479	1	Yes	Steady	Steady
Tarrant County	1,809,034	11	No	2,110,640	11	No	Steady	Steady
Travis County	1,024,266	6	No	1,290,188	6	Yes	Steady	▲
Webb County	250,304	1	Yes	267,114	1	Yes	Steady	Steady
Williamson County	422,679	2	Yes	609,017	3	No	▲1	▼

*Cameron County contains parts of both District 35 and District 37, which the Mexican American Legislative Caucus argued in MALC v. Abbott violates the "county line rule."

As a result of these changes, the following districts drastically moved:

1. District 9 moved from the Louisiana/Arkansas border to central East Texas.
2. Districts 12 and 13 switched places.
3. District 19 moved from East Texas to Central Texas.
4. District 57 moved from East Texas to Denton County.
5. District 61 moved from Wise and Parker Counties to Collin County.
6. District 68 moved from West Texas to North Texas.
7. District 76 moved from El Paso County to Fort Bend County.

=== Seats without incumbents ===
1. District 13 (around McLennan County)
2. District 20 (Williamson County)
3. District 37 (Willacy & Cameron counties)
4. District 57 (Denton County)
5. District 65 (Denton County)
6. District 70 (Collin County)
7. District 73 (Hays & Comal Counties)
8. District 76 (Fort Bend County)
9. District 85 (west of Harris County)
10. District 107 (Dallas County)

=== Double-bunked incumbents ===
*Double bunked means that two incumbents are forced into the same district due to redistricting.

1. District 7 - Jay Dean (R) and Chris Paddie (R)
2. District 9 - James White (R) and Trent Ashby (R)
3. District 12 - Kyle Kacal (R) and Ben Leman (R)
4. District 19 - Terry Wilson (R) and Kyle Biedermann (R)
5. District 26 - Jacey Jetton (R) and Phil Stephenson (R)
6. District 38 - Alex Dominguez (D) and Eddie Lucio III (D)
7. District 60 - Glenn Rogers (R) and Phil King (R)
8. District 63 - Tan Parker (R) and Michelle Beckley (D)
9. District 79 - Claudia Ordaz Perez (D) and Art Fierro (D)
10. District 108 - Morgan Meyer (R) and John Turner (D)

== Retirements ==
25 incumbents, including 10 Democrats and 15 Republicans, retired, 10 of whom sought other office.

- District 9: Chris Paddie (R) retired.
- District 13: Ben Leman (R) retired.
- District 17: John Cyrier (R) retired.
- District 19: James White (R) retired to run for Texas Commissioner of Agriculture.
- District 22: Joe Deshotel (D) retired.
- District 23: Mayes Middleton (R) retired to run for Texas State Senate.
- District 37: Alex Dominguez (D) retired to run for Texas State Senate.
- District 38: Eddie Lucio III (D) retired early on January 31, 2022, causing a special election.
- District 50: Celia Israel (D) retired to run for mayor of Austin.
- District 51: Eddie Rodriguez (D) retired to run for US House of Representatives in District 35.
- District 61: Phil King (R) retired to run for Texas State Senate.
- District 63: Tan Parker (R) retired to run for Texas State Senate.
- District 65: Michelle Beckley (D) retired to run for Texas lieutenant governor.
- District 70: Scott Sanford (R) retired.
- District 73: Kyle Biedermann (R) retired.
- District 84: John Frullo (R) retired.
- District 92: Jeff Cason (R) retired.
- District 93: Matt Krause (R) retired to run for Tarrant County District Attorney.
- District 100: Jasmine Crockett (D) retired to run for the US House of Representatives in District 30.
- District 114: John Turner (D) retired.
- District 122: Lyle Larson (R) retired.
- District 124: Ina Minjarez (D) retired to run for Bexar County Commissioners Court Judge.
- District 127: Dan Huberty (R) retired.
- District 133: Jim Murphy (R) retired.
- District 147: Garnet Coleman (D) retired early on February 28, 2022.

== Special elections ==
District 10: Jake Ellzey (R) was elected for the Texas's 6th congressional district of the United States House of Representatives in a special election. A special election to fill his seat in the Texas House of Representatives was held on August 31, 2021. No candidate received 50% of the vote, so the top-two winners, Brian Harrison and former state Rep. John Wray, advanced to a runoff held on September 28. Harrison won the runoff and was sworn in on October 12, 2021.

10th district special election
Party	Candidate	Votes	%
Republican	Brian Harrison	4,645	40.65%
Republican	John Wray	4,059	35.52%
Democratic	Pierina Otiniano	1,304	11.41%
Republican	Kevin Griffin	887	7.76%
Republican	Carl Wickliffe	355	3.11%
Independent	Scott Goodwin	107	0.94%
Republican	Susan Mellina Hayslip	38	0.33%
Libertarian	Matt Savino	31	0.27%
Total votes		11,426	100.00%

10th district special election runoff
Party	Candidate	Votes	%
Republican	Brian Harrison	6,722	55.35%
Republican	John Wray	5,422	44.65%
Total votes		12,144	100.00%
Republican hold			

District 68: Drew Springer (R) was elected for the District 30 of the Senate in a special election. A special election for the district was held on January 23, 2021. No candidate received 50% of the votes to win the election, so a runoff election was held to determine a winner of the top two candidates of the January election, Craig Carter and David Spiller. Spiller won the election on February 23, and was sworn in on March 9, 2021.

68th district special election
Party	Candidate	Votes	%
Republican	David Spiller	4,015	43.89%
Republican	Craig Carter	1,652	18.06%
Republican	John Berry	1,594	17.43%
Republican	Jason Brinkley	1,491	16.30%
Democratic	Charles D. Gregory	395	4.32%
Total votes		9,147	100.00%

68th district special election runoff
Party	Candidate	Votes	%
Republican	David Spiller	4,192	62.90%
Republican	Craig Carter	2,473	37.10%
Total votes		6,665	100.00%
Republican hold			

2021 District 118 special election
- September 29, 2021 (first round); November 2, 2021 (runoff)
Candidate	John Lujan	Frank Ramirez	Desi Martinez
Party	Republican	Democratic	Democratic
First round	2,944; 41.49%	1,422; 20.04%	1,249; 17.60%
Runoff	5,927; 51.23%	5,642; 48.77%	Eliminated
Candidate	Katie Farias	Adam E. Salyer
Party	Democratic	Republican
First round	858; 12.09%	623; 8.78%
Runoff	Eliminated	Eliminated
- Lujan: 30–40% 40–50% 50–60% 60–70% 70–80% Ramirez: 30–40% 40–50% 50–60% 60–70% 70–80% 80–90% >90% Martinez: 20–30% 30–40% 40–50% Tie: 20–30% 30–40% No vote: 50–60%
State representative before election
Leo Pacheco
Democratic
Elected State representative
John Lujan
Republican

District 118: Leo Pacheco (D) resigned to teach public administration at San Antonio College. A special election for the district was held on September 29, 2021. No candidate received 50% of the votes to win the election, so a runoff election will be held to determine a winner of the top two candidates of the September election, John Lujan and Frank Ramirez. Lujan narrowly won the runoff on November 2, 2021, flipping the district which Democratic presidential candidate Joe Biden had won by 14 percentage points in 2020.

118th district special election
Party	Candidate	Votes	%
Republican	John Lujan	2,944	41.49%
Democratic	Frank Ramirez	1,422	20.04%
Democratic	Desi Martinez	1,249	17.60%
Democratic	Katie Farias	858	12.09%
Republican	Adam E. Salyer	623	8.78%
Total votes		7,096	100.00%

118th district special election runoff
Party	Candidate	Votes	%
Republican	John Lujan	5,927	51.23%
Democratic	Frank Ramirez	5,642	48.77%
Total votes		11,569	100.00%
Republican gain from Democratic			

District 38: Eddie Lucio III (D) announced he would not seek re-election in 2022, citing personal reasons. On January 31, 2022, he resigned from his seat early. A special election to fill the seat for the remainder of Lucio's term was held on May 7, 2022. Because the filing deadline passed on December 13, 2021, the winner of the special election, Erin Gamez, would not have been able to run for a full term unless she had already filed for the general election.

== Incumbents defeated ==
=== In primaries ===
==== Democrats ====
1. District 79: Art Fierro lost renomination to fellow incumbent Claudia Ordaz Perez in a redistricting race.

==== Republicans ====
1. District 85: Phil Stephenson lost renomination to Stan Kitzman.

== Predictions ==
Redistricting greatly reduced the number of competitive seats in the state, making it almost certain that the chamber would remain in Republican hands.

=== Statewide ===
Source	Ranking	As of
Sabato's Crystal Ball	Safe R	May 19, 2022
CNalysis	Safe R	Nov. 7, 2022

=== Competitive districts ===
District	Incumbent	2020 Pres.	CNalysis	Result
35th	Oscar Longoria	57.38% D	Likely D	64.18% D
37th	Alex Dominguez	50.56% D	Lean R (flip)	51.83% R
41st	Robert Guerra	55.59% D	Likely D	56.97% D
70th	No Incumbent	54.29% D	Tilt R	50.73% D
148th	Penny Morales Shaw	57.17% D	Tilt D	55.52% D

== Results ==
=== Statewide ===
Summary of the November 8, 2022 Texas House of Representatives election results
Party	Candidates	Votes (Note: Votes were not counted for races with only one candidate.)	%	Seats	+/–	%
Republican	121	2,612,097	51.69%	86	▲1	57.33%
Democratic	109	2,308,570	45.68%	64	▼1	42.67%
Libertarian	23	121,804	2.41%	0	–	0%
Independent	2	11,069	0.22%	0	–	0%
Total	155	5,053,540	100.00%	150	–	

Popular vote
Republican	51.69%
Democratic	45.68%
Libertarian	2.41%
Independent	0.22%

House seats won
Republican	57.33%
Democratic	42.67%

=== Close races ===
Seats where the margin of victory was under 10%:

1. District 70, 1.46% (gain)
2. District 37, 3.66% (gain)
3. District 118, 3.68%
4. District 112, 9.66%

=== Results by district ===
District	Democratic		Republican		Others		Total		Result
District	Votes	%	Votes	%	Votes	%	Votes	%	Result
District 1	-	-	0	100.00%	-	-	0	100.00%	Republican hold
District 2	-	-	0	100.00%	-	-	0	100.00%	Republican hold
District 3	-	-	0	100.00%	-	-	0	100.00%	Republican hold
District 4	-	-	42,041	77.26%	12,374	22.74%	54,415	100.00%	Republican hold
District 5	-	-	0	100.00%	-	-	0	100.00%	Republican hold
District 6	15,975	26.71%	43,841	73.29%	-	-	59,816	100.00%	Republican hold
District 7	-	-	0	100.00%	-	-	0	100.00%	Republican hold
District 8	-	-	46,526	87.99%	6,350	12.01%	52,876	100.00%	Republican hold
District 9	11,171	17.63%	52,178	82.37%	-	-	63,349	100.00%	Republican hold
District 10	-	-	0	100.00%	-	-	0	100.00%	Republican hold
District 11	-	-	0	100.00%	-	-	0	100.00%	Republican hold
District 12	-	-	0	100.00%	-	-	0	100.00%	Republican hold
District 13	12,027	22.50%	41,423	77.50%	-	-	53,450	100.00%	Republican hold
District 14	-	-	29,868	68.09%	13,995	31.91%	43,863	100.00%	Republican hold
District 15	24,578	34.33%	47,021	65.67%	-	-	71,599	100.00%	Republican hold
District 16	-	-	0	100.00%	-	-	0	100.00%	Republican hold
District 17	19,404	31.87%	39,092	64.21%	2,388	3.92%	60,884	100.00%	Republican hold
District 18	-	-	0	100.00%	-	-	0	100.00%	Republican hold
District 19	26,533	27.35%	70,492	72.65%	-	-	97,025	100.00%	Republican hold
District 20	34,175	40.92%	49,345	59.08%	-	-	83,520	100.00%	Republican hold
District 21	-	-	0	100.00%	-	-	0	100.00%	Republican hold
District 22	21,399	56.49%	16,484	43.51%	-	-	37,883	100.00%	Democratic hold
District 23	20,192	36.22%	35,559	63.78%	-	-	55,751	100.00%	Republican hold
District 24	20,842	30.01%	47,240	68.01%	1,374	1.98%	69,456	100.00%	Republican hold
District 25	-	-	0	100.00%	-	-	0	100.00%	Republican hold
District 26	24,230	39.33%	37,376	60.67%	-	-	61,606	100.00%	Republican hold
District 27	40,668	70.27%	17,206	29.73%	-	-	57,874	100.00%	Democratic hold
District 28	25,124	38.44%	40,240	61.56%	-	-	65,364	100.00%	Republican hold
District 29	-	-	0	100.00%	-	-	0	100.00%	Republican hold
District 30	-	-	0	100.00%	-	-	0	100.00%	Republican hold
District 31	14,054	28.76%	34,806	71.24%	-	-	48,860	100.00%	Republican hold
District 32	-	-	0	100.00%	-	-	0	100.00%	Republican hold
District 33	23,597	34.89%	44,031	65.11%	-	-	67,628	100.00%	Republican hold
District 34	22,231	57.65%	16,333	42.35%	-	-	38,564	100.00%	Democratic hold
District 35	15,569	64.18%	8,690	35.82%	-	-	24,259	100.00%	Democratic hold
District 36	0	100.00%	-	-	-	-	0	100.00%	Democratic hold
District 37	18,995	48.17%	20,437	51.83%	-	-	39,432	100.00%	Republican gain
District 38	0	100.00%	-	-	-	-	0	100.00%	Democratic hold
District 39	19,027	64.69%	10,385	35.31%	-	-	29,412	100.00%	Democratic hold
District 40	0	100.00%	-	-	-	-	0	100.00%	Democratic hold
District 41	22,352	56.97%	16,883	43.03%	-	-	39,235	100.00%	Democratic hold
District 42	24,075	71.21%	9,734	28.79%	-	-	33,809	100.00%	Democratic hold
District 43	-	-	0	100.00%	-	-	0	100.00%	Republican hold
District 44	18,857	30.70%	42,558	69.30%	-	-	61,415	100.00%	Republican hold
District 45	39,078	59.24%	26,888	40.76%	-	-	65,966	100.00%	Democratic hold
District 46	47,273	75.48%	13,628	21.76%	1,726	2.76%	62,627	100.00%	Democratic hold
District 47	51,045	61.27%	32,272	38.73%	-	-	83,317	100.00%	Democratic hold
District 48	64,039	79.57%	-	-	16,439	20.43%	80,478	100.00%	Democratic hold
District 49	68,786	83.44%	11,882	14.41%	1,768	2.14%	82,436	100.00%	Democratic hold
District 50	36,881	76.85%	9,718	20.25%	1,392	2.90%	47,991	100.00%	Democratic hold
District 51	42,393	84.43%	7,818	15.57%	-	-	50,211	100.00%	Democratic hold
District 52	34,256	44.06%	43,498	55.94%	-	-	77,754	100.00%	Republican gain
District 53	15,926	20.17%	63,034	79.83%	-	-	78,960	100.00%	Republican hold
District 54	14,531	37.01%	24,729	62.99%	-	-	39,260	100.00%	Republican hold
District 55	18,409	38.94%	28,868	61.06%	-	-	47,277	100.00%	Republican hold
District 56	18,306	29.85%	43,026	70.15%	-	-	61,332	100.00%	Republican hold
District 57	-	-	39,934	65.29%	21,227	34.71%	61,161	100.00%	Republican hold
District 58	-	-	0	100.00%	-	-	0	100.00%	Republican hold
District 59	-	-	0	100.00%	-	-	0	100.00%	Republican hold
District 60	-	-	0	100.00%	-	-	0	100.00%	Republican hold
District 61	28,709	41.74%	40,073	58.26%	-	-	68,782	100.00%	Republican hold
District 62	-	-	0	100.00%	-	-	0	100.00%	Republican hold
District 63	28,342	44.07%	35,965	55.93%	-	-	64,307	100.00%	Republican hold
District 64	-	-	0	100.00%	-	-	0	100.00%	Republican hold
District 65	28,878	40.21%	42,934	59.79%	-	-	71,812	100.00%	Republican gain
District 66	28,039	39.58%	42,795	60.42%	-	-	70,834	100.00%	Republican hold
District 67	26,760	40.80%	38,828	59.20%	-	-	65,588	100.00%	Republican hold
District 68	-	-	0	100.00%	-	-	0	100.00%	Republican hold
District 69	9,528	18.71%	40,299	79.13%	1,100	2.16%	50,927	100.00%	Republican hold
District 70	29,660	50.73%	28,801	49.27%	-	-	58,461	100.00%	Democratic gain
District 71	10,055	19.00%	42,857	81.00%	-	-	52,912	100.00%	Republican hold
District 72	-	-	0	100.00%	-	-	0	100.00%	Republican hold
District 73	28,441	29.65%	67,491	70.35%	-	-	95,932	100.00%	Republican hold
District 74	21,112	55.67%	16,813	44.33%	-	-	37,925	100.00%	Democratic hold
District 75	19,371	75.91%	-	-	6,148	24.09%	25,519	100.00%	Democratic hold
District 76	28,312	57.26%	21,131	42.74%	-	-	49,443	100.00%	Democratic hold
District 77	0	100.00%	-	-	-	-	0	100.00%	Democratic hold
District 78	0	100.00%	-	-	-	-	0	100.00%	Democratic hold
District 79	0	100.00%	-	-	-	-	0	100.00%	Democratic hold
District 80	0	100.00%	-	-	-	-	0	100.00%	Democratic hold
District 81	-	-	0	100.00%	-	-	0	100.00%	Republican hold
District 82	-	-	0	100.00%	-	-	0	100.00%	Republican hold
District 83	-	-	0	100.00%	-	-	0	100.00%	Republican hold
District 84	-	-	0	100.00%	-	-	0	100.00%	Republican hold
District 85	16,201	24.23%	49,359	73.82%	1,308	1.96%	66,868	100.00%	Republican hold
District 86	-	-	0	100.00%	-	-	0	100.00%	Republican hold
District 87	-	-	32,924	87.08%	4,887	12.92%	37,811	100.00%	Republican hold
District 88	-	-	0	100.00%	-	-	0	100.00%	Republican hold
District 89	-	-	0	100.00%	-	-	0	100.00%	Republican hold
District 90	0	100.00%	-	-	-	-	0	100.00%	Democratic hold
District 91	-	-	0	100.00%	-	-	0	100.00%	Republican hold
District 92	20,182	58.01%	14,610	41.99%	-	-	34,792	100.00%	Democratic gain
District 93	23,399	40.07%	34,991	59.93%	-	-	58,390	100.00%	Republican hold
District 94	26,879	43.37%	35,092	56.63%	-	-	61,971	100.00%	Republican hold
District 95	28,400	74.88%	9,529	25.12%	-	-	37,929	100.00%	Democratic hold
District 96	-	-	0	100.00%	-	-	0	100.00%	Republican hold
District 97	26,890	41.80%	37,439	58.20%	-	-	64,329	100.00%	Republican hold
District 98	26,665	33.73%	52,385	66.27%	-	-	79,050	100.00%	Republican hold
District 99	20,490	38.16%	33,211	61.84%	-	-	53,701	100.00%	Republican hold
District 100	23,567	85.09%	-	-	4,131	14.91%	27,698	100.00%	Democratic hold
District 101	0	100.00%	-	-	-	-	0	100.00%	Democratic hold
District 102	23,068	62.22%	14,007	37.78%	-	-	37,075	100.00%	Democratic hold
District 103	26,783	75.52%	-	-	8,681	24.48%	35,464	100.00%	Democratic hold
District 104	0	100.00%	-	-	-	-	0	100.00%	Democratic hold
District 105	17,064	55.80%	13,519	44.20%	-	-	30,583	100.00%	Democratic hold
District 106	-	-	0	100.00%	-	-	0	100.00%	Republican hold
District 107	18,702	72.88%	-	-	6,960	27.12%	25,662	100.00%	Democratic hold
District 108	38,390	43.55%	49,755	56.45%	-	-	88,145	100.00%	Republican hold
District 109	0	100.00%	-	-	-	-	0	100.00%	Democratic hold
District 110	0	100.00%	-	-	-	-	0	100.00%	Democratic hold
District 111	37,610	79.12%	9,927	20.88%	-	-	47,537	100.00%	Democratic hold
District 112	30,946	45.17%	37,566	54.83%	-	-	68,512	100.00%	Republican hold
District 113	0	100.00%	-	-	-	-	0	100.00%	Democratic hold
District 114	36,948	66.01%	19,028	33.99%	-	-	55,976	100.00%	Democratic hold
District 115	30,085	56.70%	22,973	43.30%	-	-	53,058	100.00%	Democratic hold
District 116	0	100.00%	-	-	-	-	0	100.00%	Democratic hold
District 117	27,821	62.60%	16,620	37.40%	-	-	44,441	100.00%	Democratic hold
District 118	24,488	48.16%	26,357	51.84%	-	-	50,845	100.00%	Republican hold
District 119	29,253	78.02%	-	-	8,243	21.98%	37,496	100.00%	Democratic hold
District 120	26,413	67.50%	12,718	32.50%	-	-	39,131	100.00%	Democratic hold
District 121	34,721	44.98%	42,469	55.02%	-	-	77,190	100.00%	Republican hold
District 122	35,105	41.14%	47,804	56.02%	2,420	2.84%	85,329	100.00%	Republican hold
District 123	34,414	66.76%	17,138	33.24%	-	-	51,552	100.00%	Democratic hold
District 124	23,633	66.99%	11,643	33.01%	-	-	35,276	100.00%	Democratic hold
District 125	34,762	62.41%	20,933	37.59%	-	-	55,695	100.00%	Democratic hold
District 126	-	-	0	100.00%	-	-	0	100.00%	Republican hold
District 127	-	-	0	100.00%	-	-	0	100.00%	Republican hold
District 128	13,594	29.51%	32,465	70.49%	-	-	46,059	100.00%	Republican hold
District 129	25,194	39.21%	39,062	60.79%	-	-	64,256	100.00%	Republican hold
District 130	-	-	0	100.00%	-	-	0	100.00%	Republican hold
District 131	25,066	80.52%	6,063	19.48%	-	-	31,129	100.00%	Democratic hold
District 132	24,483	40.26%	36,322	59.74%	-	-	60,805	100.00%	Republican hold
District 133	21,826	36.39%	36,849	61.44%	1,297	2.16%	59,972	100.00%	Republican hold
District 134	49,688	61.56%	29,968	37.13%	1,058	1.31%	80,714	100.00%	Democratic hold
District 135	23,354	57.62%	17,178	42.38%	-	-	40,532	100.00%	Democratic hold
District 136	36,137	61.32%	21,240	36.04%	1,552	2.63%	58,929	100.00%	Democratic hold
District 137	14,451	76.02%	-	-	4,559	23.98%	19,010	100.00%	Democratic hold
District 138	24,353	42.91%	32,395	57.09%	-	-	56,748	100.00%	Republican hold
District 139	0	100.00%	-	-	-	-	0	100.00%	Democratic hold
District 140	0	100.00%	-	-	-	-	0	100.00%	Democratic hold
District 141	0	100.00%	-	-	-	-	0	100.00%	Democratic hold
District 142	0	100.00%	-	-	-	-	0	100.00%	Democratic hold
District 143	0	100.00%	-	-	-	-	0	100.00%	Democratic hold
District 144	0	100.00%	-	-	-	-	0	100.00%	Democratic hold
District 145	32,292	71.33%	12,979	28.67%	-	-	45,271	100.00%	Democratic hold
District 146	0	100.00%	-	-	-	-	0	100.00%	Democratic hold
District 147	0	100.00%	-	-	-	-	0	100.00%	Democratic hold
District 148	20,456	55.52%	15,691	42.59%	697	1.89%	36,844	100.00%	Democratic hold
District 149	19,034	59.84%	11,975	37.65%	799	2.51%	31,808	100.00%	Democratic hold
District 150	22,558	39.30%	34,842	60.70%	-	-	57,400	100.00%	Republican hold
Total	2,308,570	45.68%	2,612,097	51.69%	132,873	2.63%	5,053,540	100.00%	

== Detailed results ==
=== District 1 ===
Fourth-term incumbent Republican representative Gary VanDeaver had represented the 1st District since 2015. As no other candidate ran in the race, he was declared elected and the election was canceled.

1st District
Party	Candidate	Votes	%
Republican	Gary VanDeaver	0	100.00%
Total votes		0	100.00%
Republican hold			

Republican primary
Party	Candidate	Votes	%
Republican	Gary VanDeaver	13,251	62.9
Republican	George Lavender	6,103	29.0
Republican	Ray Null	1,719	8.2
Total votes		21,073	100.00%

=== District 2 ===
First-term incumbent Republican representative Bryan Slaton had represented the 2nd District since 2021. As no other candidate ran in the race, he was declared elected and the election was canceled.

2nd District
Party	Candidate	Votes	%
Republican	Bryan Slaton	0	100.00%
Total votes		0	100.00%
Republican hold			

Republican primary
Party	Candidate	Votes	%
Republican	Bryan Slaton	13,259	82.8
Republican	Clyde Bostick	2,761	17.2
Total votes		16,020	100.00%

=== District 3 ===
Fifth-term incumbent Republican representative Cecil Bell Jr. had represented the 3rd District since 2013. As no other candidate ran in the race, he was declared elected and the election was canceled.

3rd District
Party	Candidate	Votes	%
Republican	Cecil Bell Jr.	0	100.00%
Total votes		0	100.00%
Republican hold			

Republican primary
Party	Candidate	Votes	%
Republican	Cecil Bell Jr.	14,000	67.2
Republican	Kelly McDonald	6,840	32.8
Total votes		20,840	100.00%

=== District 4 ===
Second-term incumbent Republican representative Keith Bell had represented the 4th District since 2019. Matt Savino ran as the Libertarian candidate.

4th District
Party	Candidate	Votes	%
Republican	Keith Bell (incumbent)	42,041	77.26%
Libertarian	Matt Savino	12,374	22.74%
Total votes		54,415	100.00%

=== District 5 ===
Third-term incumbent Republican representative Cole Hefner had represented the 5th District since 2017. As no other candidate ran in the race, he was declared elected and the election was canceled.

5th District
Party	Candidate	Votes	%
Republican	Cole Hefner	0	100.00%
Total votes		0	100.00%
Republican hold			

Republican primary
Party	Candidate	Votes	%
Republican	Cole Hefner	20,746	77.7
Republican	Dewey Collier	5,768	22.3
Total votes		25,914	100.00%

=== District 6 ===
Fifth-term incumbent Republican representative Matt Schaefer had represented the 6th District since 2013. Cody Grace ran as the Democratic candidate.

6th District
Party	Candidate	Votes	%
Republican	Matt Schaefer (incumbent)	43,841	73.29%
Democratic	Cody Grace	15,975	26.71%
Total votes		59,816	100.00%
Republican hold			

Republican primary
Party	Candidate	Votes	%
Republican	Matt Schaefer (incumbent)	13,944	89.2
Republican	Charles Turner	1,683	10.8
Total votes		15,627	100.00%

=== District 7 ===
Third-term incumbent Republican representative Jay Dean had represented the 7th District since 2017. During redistricting, the 7th District was redrawn to include the old 9th District, which had been represented by fifth-term incumbent Republican representative Chris Paddie since 2013. Jay Dean ran for reelection, and Chris Paddie announced that he would not be seeking reelection. As no other candidate ran in the race, Jay Dean was declared elected and the election was canceled.

7th District
Party	Candidate	Votes	%
Republican	Jay Dean (incumbent)	0	100.00%
Total votes		0	100.00%
Republican hold			

=== District 8 ===
Second-term incumbent Republican representative Cody Harris had represented the 8th District since 2019. R. Edwin Adams ran as the Libertarian candidate.

8th District
Party	Candidate	Votes	%
Republican	Cody Harris (incumbent)	46,526	87.99%
Libertarian	R. Edwin Adams	6,350	12.01%
Total votes		52,876	100.00%

=== District 9 ===
Fifth-term incumbent Republican representative Trent Ashby had represented the 57th District since 2013. In redistricting, District 57 was renumbered to District 9. Jason Rogers ran as the Democratic candidate.

9th District
Party	Candidate	Votes	%
Republican	Trent Ashby (incumbent)	52,178	82.37%
Democratic	Jason Rogers	11,171	17.63%
Total votes		63,349	100.00%
Republican hold			

=== District 10 ===
First-term incumbent Republican representative Jake Ellzey represented the 10th District from January 2021 to July 2021. He resigned in July 2021 to run for U.S. House of Representatives in Texas 6th District special election. Jake Ellzey was succeeded by Brian Harrison, who ran for a full term. As no other candidate ran in the race, he was declared elected and the election was canceled.

10th District
Party	Candidate	Votes	%
Republican	Brian Harrison (incumbent)	0	100.00%
Total votes		0	100.00%
Republican hold			

=== District 11 ===
Fifth-term incumbent Republican representative Travis Clardy had represented Texas House of Representatives 11th District since 2013.

11th District
Party	Candidate	Votes	%
Republican	Travis Clardy	0	100.00%
Total votes		0	100.00%
Republican hold			

Republican primary
Party	Candidate	Votes	%
Republican	Travis Clardy	13,780	52.7
Republican	Rachel Hale	5,447	20.8
Republican	Greg Caldwell	3,474	14.4
Republican	Mark Williams	3,133	12.0
Total votes		26,127	100.00%

=== District 12 ===
Fifth-term incumbent Republican representative Kyle Kacal had represented Texas House of Representatives 12th District since 2013. Second-term incumbent Republican representative Ben Leman had represented Texas House of Representatives 13th District since 2019. The new 12th District was redrawn from the old 12th District and 13th District.

12th District
Party	Candidate	Votes	%
Republican	Kyle Kacal	0	100.00%
Total votes		0	100.00%
Republican hold			

Republican primary runoff
Party	Candidate	Votes	%
Republican	Kyle Kacal	9,366	57.9
Republican	Ben Bius	6,806	42.1
Total votes		16,172	100.00%

Republican primary
Party	Candidate	Votes	%
Republican	Kyle Kacal	11,411	47.2
Republican	Ben Bius	10,049	41.6
Republican	Joshua Hamm	2,713	11.2
Total votes		24,173	100.00%

=== District 13 ===
This district was created by the 2020 redistricting cycle. McLennan County was drawn in to this district.

13th District
Party	Candidate	Votes	%
Republican	Angelia Orr	41,423	77.50%
Democratic	Cedric Davis	12,027	22.50%
Total votes		53,450	100.00%

Republican primary
Party	Candidate	Votes	%
Republican	Angelia Orr	9,984	51.1
Republican	Dennis Wilson	9,513	48.9
Total votes		19,557	100.00%

Democratic primary
Party	Candidate	Votes	%
Democratic	Cedric Davis	2,424	73.1
Democratic	Cuevas Peacock	892	26.9
Total votes		3,316	100.00%

=== District 14 ===
Sixth-term incumbent Republican representative John N. Raney had represented Texas House of Representatives 14th District since 2011. He won reelection. Jeff Miller ran as the Libertarian candidate.

14th District
Party	Candidate	Votes	%
Republican	John N. Raney	29,868	68.09%
Libertarian	Jeff Miller	13,995	31.91%
Total votes		43,863	100.00%

Republican primary
Party	Candidate	Votes	%
Republican	John N. Raney	3,586	58.6
Republican	John Slocum	2,532	41.4
Total votes		6,118	100.00%

=== District 15 ===
Second-term incumbent Republican representative Steve Toth had represented Texas House of Representatives 15th District since 2019. He won reelection. Kristin Johnson ran as the Democratic candidate.

15th District
Party	Candidate	Votes	%
Republican	Steve Toth (incumbent)	47,021	65.67%
Democratic	Kristin Johnson	24,578	34.33%
Total votes		71,599	100.00%

Republican primary
Party	Candidate	Votes	%
Republican	Steve Toth (incumbent)	13,882	69.2
Republican	Maris Blair	2,532	30.8
Total votes		6,172	100.00%

=== District 16 ===
Fourth-term incumbent Republican representative Will Metcalf had represented Texas House of Representatives 16th District since 2015.

16th District
Party	Candidate	Votes	%
Republican	Will Metcalf (incumbent)	0	100.00%
Total votes		0	100.00%
Republican hold			

=== District 17 ===
Fourth-term incumbent Republican representative John Cyrier had represented Texas House of Representatives 17th District since 2015. He did not seek reelection.

17th District
Party	Candidate	Votes	%
Republican	Stan Gerdes	39,092	64.21%
Democratic	Madeline Eden	19,404	31.87%
Independent	Linda Curtis	2,388	3.92%
Total votes		60,884	100.00%
Republican hold			

Republican primary runoff
Party	Candidate	Votes	%
Republican	Stan Gerdes	6,591	51.2
Republican	Paul Pape	6,271	48.8
Total votes		12,862	100.00%

Republican primary
Party	Candidate	Votes	%
Republican	Stan Gerdes	6,250	30.0
Republican	Paul Pape	5,784	27.7
Republican	Tom Glass	5,379	25.2
Republican	Trey Rutledge	2,111	11.1
Republican	Jen Bezner	1,358	6.5
Total votes		20,861	100.00%

=== Districts 18 ===
Third-term incumbent Republican representative Ernest Bailes had represented Texas House of Representatives 18th District since 2017.

18th District
Party	Candidate	Votes	%
Republican	Ernest Bailes	0	100.00%
Total votes		0	100.00%
Republican hold			

Republican primary
Party	Candidate	Votes	%
Republican	Ernest Bailes	6,250	56.4
Republican	Janis Holt	5,784	26.2
Republican	Ronnie Tullos	2,613	11.7
Republican	Stephen Missick	1,302	5.8
Total votes		22,041	100.00%

=== Districts 19 ===
Third-term incumbent Republican representative Terry Wilson had represented Texas House of Representatives 20th District since 2017. He ran for election in new 20th District. Fifth-term incumbent Republican representative Kyle Biedermann had represented Texas House of Representatives 73rd District since 2013. He did not seek reelection. The 19th District was redrawn from the old 20th District and 73rd District.

19th District
Party	Candidate	Votes	%
Republican	Ellen Troxclair	70,492	72.65%
Democratic	Pam Baggett	26,533	27.35%
Total votes		97,025	100.00%
Republican hold			

Republican primary runoff
Party	Candidate	Votes	%
Republican	Ellen Troxclair	12,573	56.5
Republican	Justin Berry	9,677	43.5
Total votes		22,250	100.00%

Republican primary
Party	Candidate	Votes	%
Republican	Ellen Troxclair	12,324	38.2
Republican	Justin Berry	11,395	35.4
Republican	Nubia Devine	7,025	21.8
Republican	Perla Hopkins	1,472	4.6
Total votes		32,216	100.00%

=== District 20 ===
This district was created by the 2020 redistricting cycle. Williamson County was drawn in to this district. Terry Wilson ran as the Republican candidate. Raul Camacho ran as the Democratic candidate.

20th District
Party	Candidate	Votes	%
Republican	Terry Wilson (incumbent)	49,345	59.08%
Democratic	Raul Camacho	34,175	40.92%
Total votes		83,520	100.00%
Republican hold			

=== District 21 ===
Fourth-term incumbent Republican representative Dade Phelan had represented Texas House of Representatives 21st District since 2015. He won reelection.

21st District
Party	Candidate	Votes	%
Republican	Dade Phelan (incumbent)	0	100.00%
Total votes		0	100.00%
Republican hold			

=== District 22 ===
12th-term incumbent Democratic representative Joe Deshotel had represented Texas House of Representatives 22nd District since 1999. He did not seek reelection.

22nd District
Party	Candidate	Votes	%
Democratic	Christian Hayes	21,399	56.49%
Republican	Jacorion Randle	16,484	43.51%
Total votes		37,883	100.00%
Democratic hold			

Democratic primary runoff
Party	Candidate	Votes	%
Democratic	Christian Hayes	3,625	50.9
Democratic	Joseph Trahan	3,502	49.1
Total votes		7,127	100.00%

Democratic primary
Party	Candidate	Votes	%
Democratic	Christian Hayes	5,023	48.5
Democratic	Joseph Trahan	4,426	42.7
Democratic	Lisa Weber	915	8.5
Total votes		10,364	100.00%

=== District 23 ===
Second-term incumbent Republican representative Mayes Middleton had represented Texas House of Representatives 23rd District since 2015. He retired to run in the Texas State Senate 11th District election.

23rd District
Party	Candidate	Votes	%
Republican	Terri Leo-Wilson	35,559	63.78%
Democratic	Keith Henry	20,192	36.22%
Total votes		55,751	100.00%

Republican primary runoff
Party	Candidate	Votes	%
Republican	Terri Leo-Wilson	5,224	57.7
Republican	Patrick Gurski	3,835	42.3
Total votes		9,059	100.00%

Republican primary
Party	Candidate	Votes	%
Republican	Patrick Gurski	5,191	31.4
Republican	Terri Leo-Wilson	4,460	28.2
Republican	Abel Longoria	3,647	22.0
Republican	Gina Smith	3,053	18.4
Total votes		16,551	100.00%

=== District 24 ===
Fifth-term incumbent Republican representative Greg Bonnen had represented Texas House of Representatives 24th District since 2013. He won reelection.

24th District
Party	Candidate	Votes	%
Republican	Greg Bonnen (incumbent)	47,240	68.01%
Democratic	Michael Creedon	20,842	30.01%
Libertarian	Ryan McCamy	1,374	1.98%
Total votes		69,456	100.00%

=== District 25 ===
First-term incumbent Republican representative Cody Vasut had represented Texas House of Representatives 25th District since 2021. He won reelection.

25th District
Party	Candidate	Votes	%
Republican	Cody Vasut (incumbent)	0	100.00%
Total votes		0	100.00%
Republican hold			

=== District 26 ===
First-term incumbent Republican representative Jacey Jetton had represented Texas House of Representatives 26th District since 2021. He won election in New 26th District. Fifth-term incumbent Republican representative Phil Stephenson had represented Texas House of Representatives 85th District since 2013. He did not seek reelection. The 26th District was redrawn from the old 26th District and 85th District.

26th District
Party	Candidate	Votes	%
Republican	Jacey Jetton (incumbent)	37,376	60.67%
Democratic	Daniel Lee	24,230	39.33%
Total votes		61,606	100.00%

Democratic primary
Party	Candidate	Votes	%
Democratic	Daniel Lee	3,303	63.2
Democratic	Joseph Trahan	1,625	36.8
Total votes		5,228	100.00%

=== District 27 ===
Sixth-term incumbent Republican representative Jacey Jetton had represented Texas House of Representatives 27th District since 2011. He won reelection in the new 26th District.

27th District
Party	Candidate	Votes	%
Democratic	Ron Reynolds (incumbent)	40,668	70.27%
Republican	Sohrab Gilani	17,206	29.73%
Total votes		57,874	100.00%

Democratic primary
Party	Candidate	Votes	%
Democratic	Ron Reynolds (incumbent)	8,252	84.9
Democratic	Rodrigo Carreon	1,471	15.1
Total votes		9,723	100.00%

=== District 28 ===
Second-term incumbent Republican representative Gary Gates had represented Texas House of Representatives 28th District since 2020. He won reelection.

28th District
Party	Candidate	Votes	%
Republican	Gary Gates (incumbent)	40,240	61.56%
Democratic	Nelvin Adriatico	25,124	38.44%
Total votes		65,364	100.00%
Republican hold			

Republican primary
Party	Candidate	Votes	%
Republican	Gary Gates (incumbent)	6,702	75.6
Republican	Robert Boettcher	2,168	24.4
Total votes		8,870	100.00%

=== District 29 ===
Fifth-term incumbent Republican representative Ed Thompson had represented Texas House of Representatives 29th District since 2013. He won reelection.

29th District
Party	Candidate	Votes	%
Republican	Ed Thompson (incumbent)	0	100.00%
Total votes		0	100.00%
Republican hold			

=== District 30 ===
12th-term incumbent Republican representative Geanie Morrison had represented Texas House of Representatives 30th District since 1999. She won reelection.

30th District
Party	Candidate	Votes	%
Republican	Geanie Morrison (incumbent)	0	100.00%
Total votes		0	100.00%
Republican hold			

=== District 31 ===
2022 Texas's 31st state house district election
- November 8, 2022
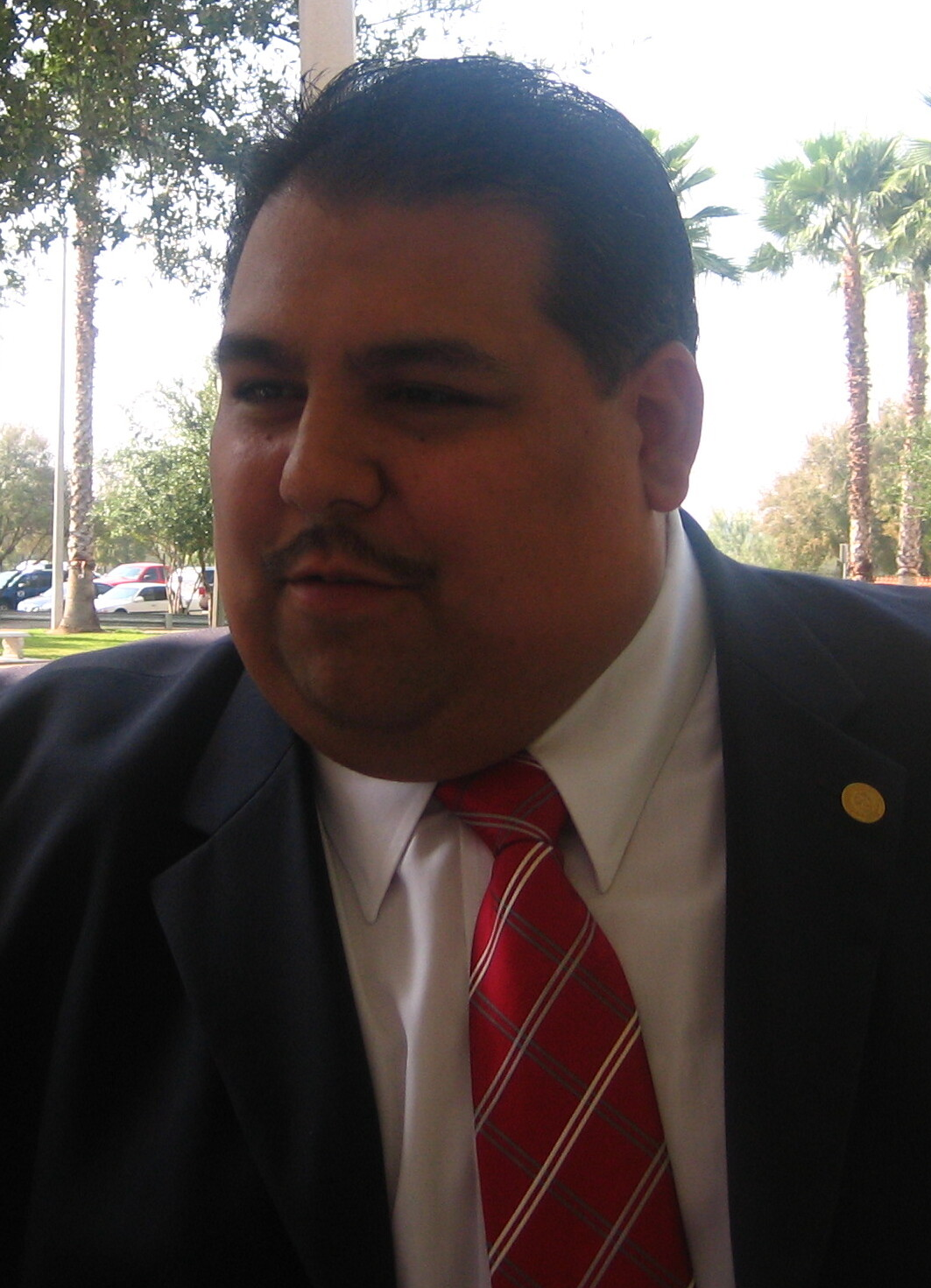

Nominee	Ryan Guillen	Martha Gutierrez
Party	Republican	Democratic
Popular vote	34,806	14,054
Percentage	71.24%	28.76%
- County results Guillen: 50–60% 70–80% 80–90% >90% Gutierrezl: 60–70%
State representative before election
Ryan Guillen
Republican
Elected State representative
Ryan Guillen
Republican

Tenth-term incumbent Republican representative Ryan Guillen had represented Texas House of Representatives 31st District since 2003. First elected as a Democrat, he announced he would switch to the Republican Party on November 15, 2021. He won reelection.

31st District
Party	Candidate	Votes	%
Republican	Ryan Guillen (incumbent)	34,806	71.24%
Democratic	Martha Gutierrez	14,054	28.76%
Total votes		48,860	100.00%

Republican primary
Party	Candidate	Votes	%
Republican	Ryan Guillen (incumbent)	8,334	59.0
Republican	Michael Monreal	4,350	32.1
Republican	Alena Berlanga	1,255	8.9
Total votes		14,119	100.00%

=== District 32 ===
Seventh-term incumbent Republican representative Todd Ames Hunter had represented Texas House of Representatives 32nd District since 2009. He won reelection.

32nd District
Party	Candidate	Votes	%
Republican	Todd Ames Hunter (incumbent)	0	100.00%
Total votes		0	100.00%
Republican hold			

=== District 33 ===
Third-term incumbent Republican representative Justin Holland had represented Texas House of Representatives 33rd District since 2017. He won reelection.

33rd District
Party	Candidate	Votes	%
Republican	Justin Holland (incumbent)	44,031	65.11%
Democratic	Graeson Lynskey	23,597	34.89%
Total votes		67,628	100.00%

Republican primary
Party	Candidate	Votes	%
Republican	Justin Holland (incumbent)	6,402	69.2
Republican	Dennis London	2,326	25.4
Republican	Scott LaMarca	429	4.7
Total votes		9,157	100.00%

Democratic primary
Party	Candidate	Votes	%
Democratic	Graeson Lynskey		
Democratic	Peter Haase		
Total votes			100.00%

=== District 34 ===
District 34 election
- November 8, 2022
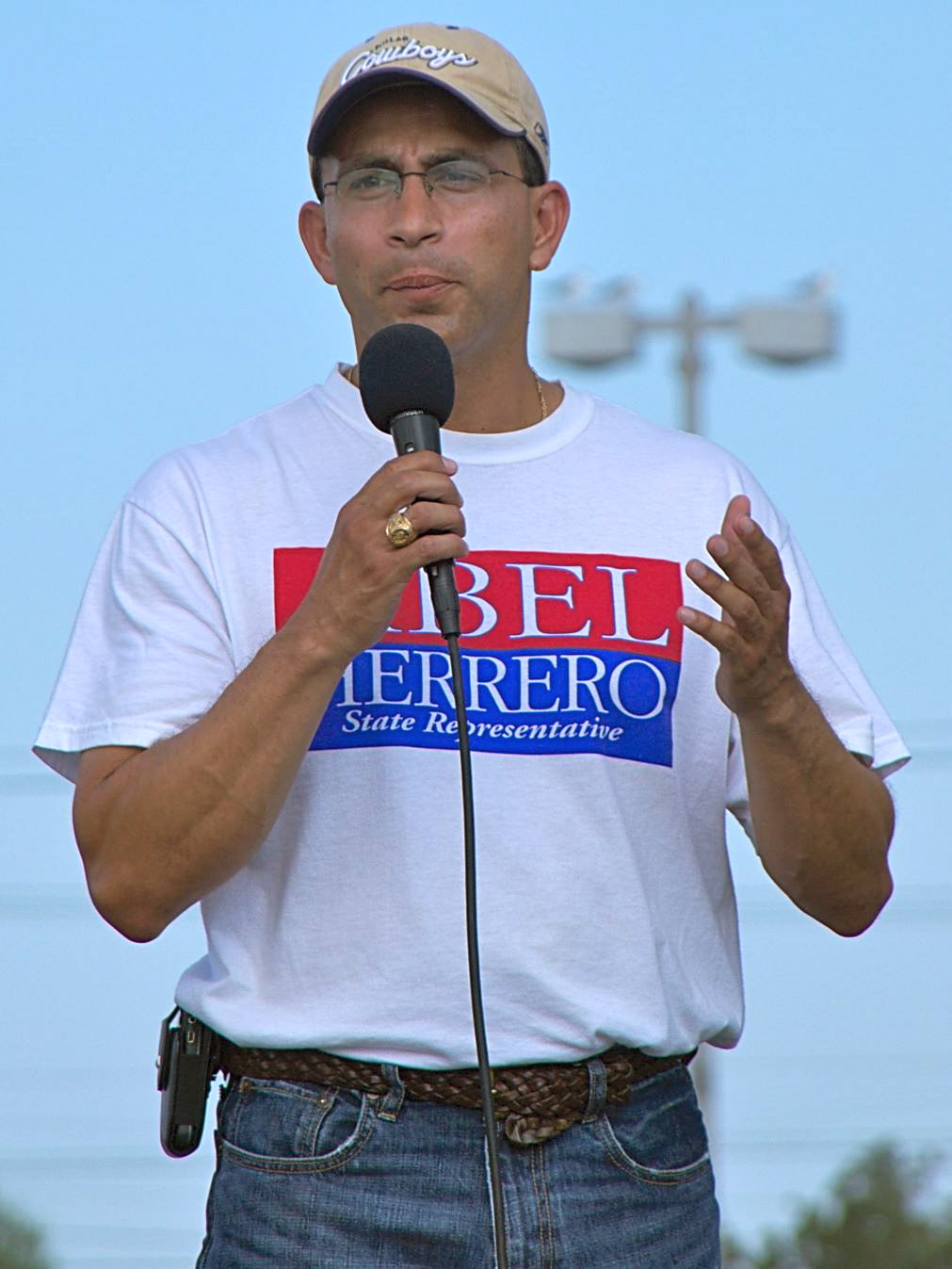

Nominee	Abel Herrero	Carolyn Vaughn
Party	Democratic	Republican
Popular vote	22,231	16,333
Percentage	57.65%	42.35%
- Precinct results Herrero: 50–60% 60–70% 70–80% 80–90% >90% Vaugn: 50–60% 60–70% 70–80%
State representative before election
Abel Herrero
Democratic
Elected State representative
Abel Herrero
Democratic

Fifth-term incumbent Democratic representative Abel Herrero had represented Texas House of Representatives 34th District since 2013. He won reelection.

34th District
Party	Candidate	Votes	%
Democratic	Abel Herrero (incumbent)	22,231	57.65%
Republican	Carolyn Vaughn	16,333	42.35%
Total votes		38,564	100.00%
Democratic hold			

Republican primary
Party	Candidate	Votes	%
Republican	Carolyn Vaughn	4,831	72.3
Republican	James Hernandez	1,854	27.7
Total votes		6,685	100.00%

=== District 35 ===
Fifth-term incumbent Democratic representative Oscar Longoria had represented Texas House of Representatives 35th District since 2013. He won reelection.

35th District
Party	Candidate	Votes	%
Democratic	Oscar Longoria (incumbent)	15,569	64.18%
Republican	Oscar Rosa	8,690	35.82%
Total votes		24,259	100.00%

=== District 36 ===
Sixth-term incumbent Democratic representative Sergio Muñoz had represented Texas House of Representatives 36th District since 2011. He won reelection.

36th District
Party	Candidate	Votes	%
Democratic	Sergio Muñoz (incumbent)	0	100.00%
Total votes		0	100.00%
Democratic hold			

District 37 election
- November 8, 2022
Nominee	Janie Lopez	Luis Villareal Jr.
Party	Republican	Democratic
Popular vote	20,437	18,995
Percentage	51.83%	48.17%
- Precinct results Lopez: 50–60% 60–70% 70–80% 80–90% Villareal: 50–60% 60–70%
State representative before election
Alex Dominguez
Democratic
Elected State representative
Janie Lopez
Republican

=== District 37 ===
This district was created by the 2020 redistricting cycle. Willacy County and Cameron County were drawn in to this district. The district was a prime subject in the redistricting lawsuit MALC v. Abbott, which alleged that the district was drawn in a racially discriminatory manner. No decision was reached prior to the election, so the district was used for the election without changes.

37th District
Party	Candidate	Votes	%
Republican	Janie Lopez	20,437	51.83%
Democratic	Luis Villarreal Jr.	18,995	48.17%
Total votes		39,432	100.00%
Republican gain from Democratic			

Democratic primary runoff
Party	Candidate	Votes	%
Democratic	Luis Villarreal Jr.	3,456	52.4
Democratic	Ruben Cortez Jr.	3,134	47.6
Total votes		6,590	100.00%

Republican primary
Party	Candidate	Votes	%
Republican	Janie Lopez	4,733	69.4
Republican	John Slocum	3,090	30.6
Total votes		6,823	100.00%

Democratic primary
Party	Candidate	Votes	%
Democratic	Ruben Cortez Jr.	3,605	42.7
Democratic	Luis Villarreal Jr.	3,369	38.5
Democratic	Frank Puente	1,769	20.2
Total votes		8,743	100.00%

=== District 38 ===
Second-term incumbent Democratic representative Alex Dominguez had represented Texas House of Representatives 37th District since 2019. He retired to run for Texas State Senate 27th District. Eighth-term incumbent Democratic representative Eddie Lucio III had represented Texas House of Representatives 38th District since 2011. He resigned in January 2022. The seat would be filled for the remainder of the term by a special election. The new 38th District was redrawn from the old 37th District and 38th District.

38th District
Party	Candidate	Votes	%
Democratic	Erin Gamez	0	100.00%
Total votes		0	100.00%
Democratic hold			

Democratic primary
Party	Candidate	Votes	%
Democratic	Erin Gamez	5,415	58.3
Democratic	Jonathan Gracia	3,879	42.7
Total votes		9,294	100.00%

=== District 39 ===
Ninth-term incumbent Democratic representative Armando Martinez had represented Texas House of Representatives 39th District since 2005. He won reelection.

39th District
Party	Candidate	Votes	%
Democratic	Armando Martinez (incumbent)	19,027	64.69%
Republican	Jimmie Garcia	10,385	35.31%
Total votes		29,412	100,00%
Democratic hold			

=== District 40 ===
Fifth-term incumbent Democratic representative Terry Canales had represented Texas House of Representatives 40th District since 2013. He won reelection.

40th District
Party	Candidate	Votes	%
Democratic	Terry Canales (incumbent)	0	100.00%
Total votes		0	100.00%
Democratic hold			

=== District 41 ===
Sixth-term incumbent Democratic representative Robert Guerra had represented Texas House of Representatives 41st District since 2012. He won reelection.

41st District
Party	Candidate	Votes	%
Democratic	Robert Guerra (incumbent)	22,352	56.97%
Republican	John Guerra	16,883	43.03%
Total votes		39,235	100.00%
Democratic hold			

=== District 42 ===
11th-term incumbent Democratic representative Richard Pena Raymond had represented Texas House of Representatives 42nd District since 2001. He won reelection.

42nd District
Party	Candidate	Votes	%
Democratic	Richard Pena Raymond (incumbent)	24,075	71.21%
Republican	Joe Brennan	9,734	28.79%
Total votes		33,809	100.00%
Democratic hold			

Democratic primary
Party	Candidate	Votes	%
Democratic	Richard Pena Raymond (incumbent)	8,587	62.7
Democratic	Jorge Delgado	5,119	37.3
Total votes		13,706	100.00%

=== District 43 ===
Sixth-term incumbent Republican representative Jose Manuel Lozano Jr. had represented Texas House of Representatives 43rd District since 2011. He won reelection.

43rd District
Party	Candidate	Votes	%
Republican	Jose Manuel Lozano Jr. (incumbent)	0	100.00%
Total votes		0	100.00%
Republican hold			

=== District 44 ===
Sixth-term incumbent Republican representative John Kuempel had represented Texas House of Representatives 44th District since 2011. He won reelection.

44th District
Party	Candidate	Votes	%
Republican	John Kuempel (incumbent)	42,558	69.30%
Democratic	Robert M. Bohmfalk	18,857	30.70%
Total votes		61,415	100.00%
Republican hold			

=== District 45 ===
Second-term incumbent Democratic representative Erin Zwiener had represented Texas House of Representatives 45th District since 2019. She won reelection.

45th District
Party	Candidate	Votes	%
Democratic	Erin Zwiener (incumbent)	39,078	59.24%
Republican	Michelle Lopez	26,888	40.76%
Total votes		65,966	100.00%
Democratic hold			

Democratic primary
Party	Candidate	Votes	%
Democratic	Erin Zwiener	4,800	83.3
Democratic	Angela Villescaz	576	10.0
Democratic	Jessica Mejia	383	6.7
Total votes		5,759	100.00%

=== District 46 ===
Second-term incumbent Democratic representative Sheryl Cole had represented the Texas House of Representatives' 46th District since 2019. She won reelection. This district incorporates parts of East Austin, Pflugerville, and Manor.

46th District
Party	Candidate	Votes	%
Democratic	Sheryl Cole (incumbent)	47,273	75.48%
Republican	Samuel Strasser	13,628	21.76%
Libertarian	Thomas Kost	1,726	2.76%
Total votes		62,628	100,00%
Democratic hold			

=== District 47 ===
Second-term incumbent Democratic representative Vikki Goodwin had represented Texas House of Representatives 47th District since 2019. She won reelection.

47th District
Party	Candidate	Votes	%
Democratic	Vikki Goodwin (incumbent)	51,045	61.27%
Republican	Rob McCarthy	32,272	38.73%
Total votes		83,317	100.00%
Democratic hold			

=== District 48 ===
Eighth-term incumbent Democratic representative Donna Howard had represented Texas House of Representatives 48th District since 2006. She won reelection.

48th District
Party	Candidate	Votes	%
Democratic	Donna Howard (incumbent)	64,039	79.57%
Libertarian	Daniel McCarthy	16,439	20.43%
Total votes		80,478	100.00%
Democratic hold			

=== District 49 ===
Third-term incumbent Democratic representative Gina Hinojosa had represented Texas House of Representatives 49th District since 2017. She won reelection.

49th District
Party	Candidate	Votes	%
Democratic	Gina Hinojosa (incumbent)	68,786	83.44%
Republican	Katherine Griffin	11,882	14.41%
Libertarian	David Roberson	1,768	2.14%
Total votes		82,436	100.00%
Democratic hold			

=== District 50 ===
Fifth-term incumbent Democratic representative Celia Israel had represented Texas House of Representatives 49th District since 2014. She did not seek reelection.

50th District
Party	Candidate	Votes	%
Democratic	James Talarico (incumbent)	36,881	76.85%
Republican	Victor Johnson	9,718	20.25%
Libertarian	Ted Brown	1,392	2.90%
Total votes		47,991	100.00%
Democratic hold			

Democratic primary
Party	Candidate	Votes	%
Democratic	James Talarico (incumbent)	9,051	78.4
Democratic	David Alcorta	2,940	21.6
Total votes		11,541	100.00%

=== District 51 ===
Fifth-term incumbent Democratic representative Eddie Rodriguez had represented Texas House of Representatives 51st District since 2013. He retired to run for Texas State Senate 35th District.

51st District
Party	Candidate	Votes	%
Democratic	Lulu Flores	42,393	84.43%
Republican	Robert Reynolds	7,818	15.57%
Total votes		50,211	100.00%
Democratic hold			

Democratic primary
Party	Candidate	Votes	%
Democratic	Lulu Flores	8,074	60.3
Democratic	Cynthia Valadez-Mata	1,525	11.4
Democratic	Matthew Worthington	1,408	10.5
Democratic	Claire Campos-O'Neal	991	7.4
Democratic	Albino Cadenas	635	4.7
Democratic	Mike Hendrix	498	3.7
Democratic	Cody Arn	268	2.0
Total votes		1,339	100.00%

=== District 52 ===
Third-term incumbent Democratic representative James Talarico had represented Texas House of Representatives 52nd District since 2018. He announced that he would move to the 50th District after his district was redrawn to favor Republicans.

52nd District
Party	Candidate	Votes	%
Republican	Caroline Harris	43,498	55.94%
Democratic	Luis Echegaray	34,256	44.06%
Total votes		77,754	100.00%
Republican gain from Democratic			

Republican primary runoff
Party	Candidate	Votes	%
Republican	Caroline Harris	4,917	50.6
Republican	Patrick McGuinness	4,809	49.4
Total votes		9,726	100.00%

Republican primary
Party	Candidate	Votes	%
Republican	Patrick McGuinness	5,706	35.1
Republican	Caroline Harris	5,095	31.4
Republican	Nelson Jarrin	4,187	25.8
Republican	Jonathan Schober	1,260	7.8
Total votes		16,248	100.00%

=== District 53 ===
Fourth-term incumbent Republican representative Andrew S. Murr had represented Texas House of Representatives 53rd District since 2015. He won reelection.

53rd District
Party	Candidate	Votes	%
Republican	Andrew S. Murr (incumbent)	63,034	79.83%
Democratic	Joe P. Herrera	15,926	20.17%
Total votes		78,960	100.00%

Republican primary
Party	Candidate	Votes	%
Republican	Andrew S. Murr (incumbent)	21,218	63.4
Republican	Wesley Virdell	12,275	36.6
Total votes		33,493	100.00%

=== District 54 ===
Second-term incumbent Republican representative Brad Buckley had represented Texas House of Representatives 54th District since 2019. He won reelection.

54th District
Party	Candidate	Votes	%
Republican	Brad Buckley (incumbent)	24,729	62.99%
Democratic	Jonathan Hildner	14,531	37.01%
Total votes		39,260	100.00%

=== District 55 ===
Third-term incumbent Republican representative Hugh Shine had represented Texas House of Representatives 55th District since 2017. He won reelection.

55th District
Party	Candidate	Votes	%
Republican	Hugh Shine (incumbent)	28,868	61.06%
Democratic	Tristian Sanders	18,409	38.94%
Total votes		47,277	100.00%

=== District 56 ===
Ninth-term incumbent Republican representative Hugh Shine had represented Texas House of Representatives 55th District since 2005. He won reelection.

56th District
Party	Candidate	Votes	%
Republican	Charles Anderson (incumbent)	43,026	70.15%
Democratic	Erin Shank	18,306	29.85%
Total votes		61,332	100.00%

=== District 57 ===
This district was created by the 2020 redistricting cycle. A part of Denton County was drawn in to this district.

57th District
Party	Candidate	Votes	%
Republican	Richard Hayes	39,934	65.29%
Libertarian	Darren Hamilton	21,227	34.71%
Total votes		61,161	100.00%

Republican primary
Party	Candidate	Votes	%
Republican	Richard Hayes	7,127	57.5
Republican	Matthew Poole	3,559	28.7
Republican	Matthew Haines	1,310	17.8
Total votes		12,396	100.00%

=== District 58 ===
Fourth-term incumbent Republican representative DeWayne Burns had represented Texas House of Representatives 58th District since 2015. He won reelection.

58th District
Party	Candidate	Votes	%
Republican	DeWayne Burns (incumbent)	0	100.00%
Total votes		0	100.00%
Republican hold			

=== District 59 ===
First-term incumbent Republican representative Shelby Slawson had represented Texas House of Representatives 59th District since 2021. She won reelection.

59th District
Party	Candidate	Votes	%
Republican	Shelby Slawson (incumbent)	0	100.00%
Total votes		0	100.00%
Republican hold			

=== District 60 ===
First-term incumbent Republican representative Glenn Rogers had represented Texas House of Representatives 60th District since 2021. 12th-term incumbent Republican representative Phil King had represented Texas House of Representatives 61st District since 1999. The new 60th District was redrawn from the old 60th District and 61st District.

60th District
Party	Candidate	Votes	%
Republican	Glenn Rogers (incumbent)	0	100.00%
Total votes		0	100.00%
Republican hold			

Republican primary runoff
Party	Candidate	Votes	%
Republican	Glenn Rogers (incumbent)	10,043	50.8
Republican	Mike Olcott	9,725	49.2
Total votes			100.00%

Republican primary
Party	Candidate	Votes	%
Republican	Glenn Rogers (incumbent)	12,160	43.7
Republican	Mike Olcott	10,045	38.1
Republican	Kit Marshall	3,236	11.6
Republican	Lucas Turner	2,393	8.6
Total votes		27,834	100.00%

=== District 61 ===
This district was created by the 2020 redistricting cycle. A part of Collin County was drawn in to this district.

61st District
Party	Candidate	Votes	%
Republican	Frederick Frazier	40,073	58.26%
Democratic	Sheena King	28,709	41.74%
Total votes		68,782	100.00%

Republican primary runoff
Party	Candidate	Votes	%
Republican	Frederick Frazier	6,438	63.9
Republican	Paul Chabot	3,635	36.1
Total votes		10,073	100.00%

Republican primary
Party	Candidate	Votes	%
Republican	Frederick Frazier	6,018	42.2
Republican	Paul Chabot	5,217	36.6
Republican	Jim Herblin	3,009	21.1
Total votes		14,244	100.00%

=== District 62 ===
Third-term incumbent Republican representative Reggie Smith had represented Texas House of Representatives 62nd District since 2018. He won reelection.

62nd District
Party	Candidate	Votes	%
Republican	Reggie Smith (incumbent)	0	100.00%
Total votes		0	100.00%
Republican hold			

=== District 63 ===
Eighth-term incumbent Republican representative Tan Parker had represented Texas House of Representatives 63rd District since 2007. He retired to run for Texas State Senate 12th District. Second-term incumbent Democratic representative Michelle Beckley had represented Texas House of Representatives 65th District since 2019. She retired to run for lieutenant governor of Texas. The new 63rd District was redrawn from the old 63rd District and 65th District.

63rd District
Party	Candidate	Votes	%
Republican	Ben Bumgarner	35,965	55.93%
Democratic	Denise Wooten	28,342	44.07%
Total votes		64,307	100.00%

Republican primary runoff
Party	Candidate	Votes	%
Republican	Ben Bumgarner	4,948	62.2
Republican	Jeff Younger	3,003	37.8
Total votes			100.00%

Republican primary
Party	Candidate	Votes	%
Republican	Ben Bumgarner	3,707	29.0
Republican	Jeff Younger	3,505	27.5
Republican	Nick Sanders	3,122	19.0
Republican	Nick Sanders	2,491	8.6
Total votes		12,767	100.00%

=== District 64 ===
Third-term incumbent Republican representative Lynn Stucky had represented Texas House of Representatives 64th District since 2017. He won reelection.

64th District
Party	Candidate	Votes	%
Republican	Lynn Stucky (incumbent)	0	100.00%
Total votes		0	100.00%
Republican hold			

Republican primary
Party	Candidate	Votes	%
Republican	Lynn Stucky (incumbent)	9,282	50.3
Republican	Andy Hopper	9,188	49.7
Total votes		18,470	100.00%

=== District 65 ===
This district was created by the 2020 redistricting cycle. A part of Denton County was drawn in to this district.

65th District
Party	Candidate	Votes	%
Republican	Kronda Thimesch	42,934	59.79%
Democratic	Brittney Verdell	28,878	40.21%
Total votes		71,812	100.00%
Republican gain from Democratic			

Republican primary
Party	Candidate	Votes	%
Republican	Kronda Thimesch	8,639	59.7
Republican	Peyton Inge	3,620	26.4
Republican	Robert Cooksey	2,020	14.0
Total votes		14,479	100.00%

=== District 66 ===
Fourth-term incumbent Republican representative Matt Shaheen had represented Texas House of Representatives 66th District since 2015. He won reelection.

66th District
Party	Candidate	Votes	%
Republican	Matt Shaheen (incumbent)	42,795	60.42%
Democratic	Jesse Ringness	28,039	39.58%
Total votes		70,834	100.00%
Republican hold			

=== District 67 ===
Fifth-term incumbent Republican representative Jeff Leach had represented Texas House of Representatives 67th District since 2013. He won reelection.

67th District
Party	Candidate	Votes	%
Republican	Jeff Leach (incumbent)	38,828	59.20%
Democratic	Kevin Morris	26,760	40.80%
Total votes		65,588	100.00%
Republican hold			

Republican primary
Party	Candidate	Votes	%
Republican	Jeff Leach (incumbent)	10,006	76.8
Republican	Julia Schmoker	3,016	23.2
Total votes		13,022	100.00%

=== District 68 ===
First-term incumbent Republican representative David Spiller had represented Texas House of Representatives 68th District since 2021. He won reelection. By the 2020 redistricting cycle, Texas House 68th District moved from West Texas to North Texas.

68th District
Party	Candidate	Votes	%
Republican	David Spiller (incumbent)	0	100.00%
Total votes		0	100.00%
Republican hold			

Republican primary
Party	Candidate	Votes	%
Republican	David Spiller (incumbent)	6,665	68.2
Republican	Mark Middleton	1,299	13.3
Republican	Gary Franklin	947	9.7
Republican	Craig Carter	863	8.8
Total votes		9,744	100.00%

=== District 69 ===
Fifth-term incumbent Republican representative James Frank had represented Texas House of Representatives 69th District since 2013. He won reelection.

69th District
Party	Candidate	Votes	%
Republican	James Frank (incumbent)	40,299	79.13%
Democratic	Walter Coppage	9,528	18.71%
Libertarian	Michael Neumann	1,100	2.16%
Total votes		50,927	100.00%
Republican hold			

=== District 70 ===
District 70 election
- November 8, 2022
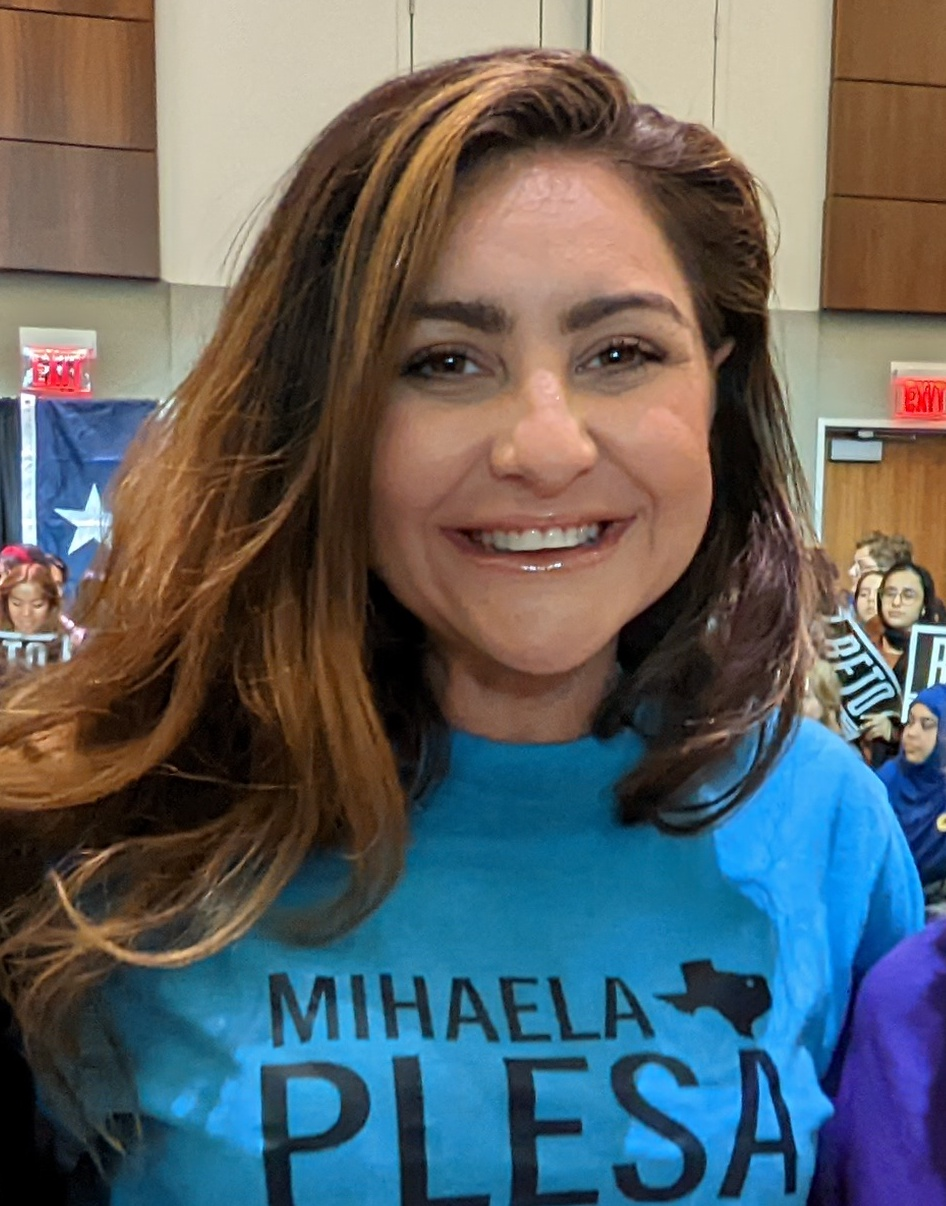

Nominee	Mihaela Plesa	Jamee Jolly
Party	Democratic	Republican
Popular vote	29,660	28,801
Percentage	50.73%	49.27%
- Precinct results Plesa: 50–60% 60–70% 70–80% >90% Jolly: 50–60% 60–70%
State representative before election
Scott Sanford
Republican
Elected State representative
Mihaela Plesa
Democratic

Formerly based around McKinney, District 70 was redrawn to center around Plano. Incumbent Republican Scott Sanford did not run for reelection in the new district. Formerly a Republican stronghold, southern Collin County had become increasingly competitive in recent years, so both parties expected the race to be close. Democrat Mihaela Plesa narrowly defeated Republican Jamee Jolly to win the seat, becoming the first Democrat to win election from Collin County in over 30 years.

70th District
Party	Candidate	Votes	%
Democratic	Mihaela Plesa	29,660	50.73%
Republican	Jamee Jolly	28,801	49.27%
Total votes		58,461	100.00%
Democratic gain from Republican			

Democratic primary runoff
Party	Candidate	Votes	%
Democratic	Mihaela Plesa	2,588	55.13%
Democratic	Cassandra Garcia Hernandez	2,106	44.87%
Total votes		4,694	100.00%

Republican primary runoff
Party	Candidate	Votes	%
Republican	Jamee Jolly	4,518	52.12%
Republican	Eric Bowlin	4,151	47.88%
Total votes		8,669	100.00%

Democratic primary
Party	Candidate	Votes	%
Democratic	Cassandra Garcia Hernandez	2,513	34.2
Democratic	Mihaela Plesa	2,435	33.1
Democratic	Lorenzo Sanchez	2,406	32.7
Total votes		7,354	100.0%

Republican primary
Party	Candidate	Votes	%
Republican	Jamee Jolly	4,158	38.0
Republican	Eric Bowlin	3,495	32.0
Republican	Hayden Padgett	2,338	21.4
Republican	Daniel Chandler	694	6.4
Republican	LaDale Buggs	243	2.2
Total votes		10,928	100.0%

=== District 71 ===
Third-term incumbent Republican representative Stan Lambert had represented Texas House of Representatives 71st District since 2017. He won reelection.

71st District
Party	Candidate	Votes	%
Republican	Stan Lambert (incumbent)	42,857	81.00%
Democratic	Linda Goolsbee	10,055	19.00%
Total votes		52,912	100.00%

Republican primary
Party	Candidate	Votes	%
Republican	Stan Lambert (incumbent)	12,951	75.6
Republican	Samuel Weatherby	4,175	24.4
Total votes		17,126	100.00%

=== District 72 ===
Eighth-term incumbent Republican representative Drew Darby had represented Texas House of Representatives 72nd District since 2007. He won reelection.

72nd District
Party	Candidate	Votes	%
Republican	Drew Darby (incumbent)	0	100.00%
Total votes		0	100.00%
Republican hold			

=== District 73 ===
This district was created by the 2020 redistricting cycle. Hays County and Comal County were drawn into this district.

73rd District
Party	Candidate	Votes	%
Republican	Carrie Isaac	67,491	70.35%
Democratic	Justin Calhoun	28,441	29.65%
Total votes		95,932	100.00%

Republican primary runoff
Party	Candidate	Votes	%
Republican	Carrie Isaac	11,239	50.6
Republican	Barron Casteel	10,968	49.4
Total votes		22,207	100.00%

Republican primary
Party	Candidate	Votes	%
Republican	Barron Casteel	12,966	45.6
Republican	Carrie Isaac	12,725	44.8
Republican	George Green	2,726	9.6
Total votes		28,417	100.00%

=== District 74 ===
District 74 election
- November 8, 2022
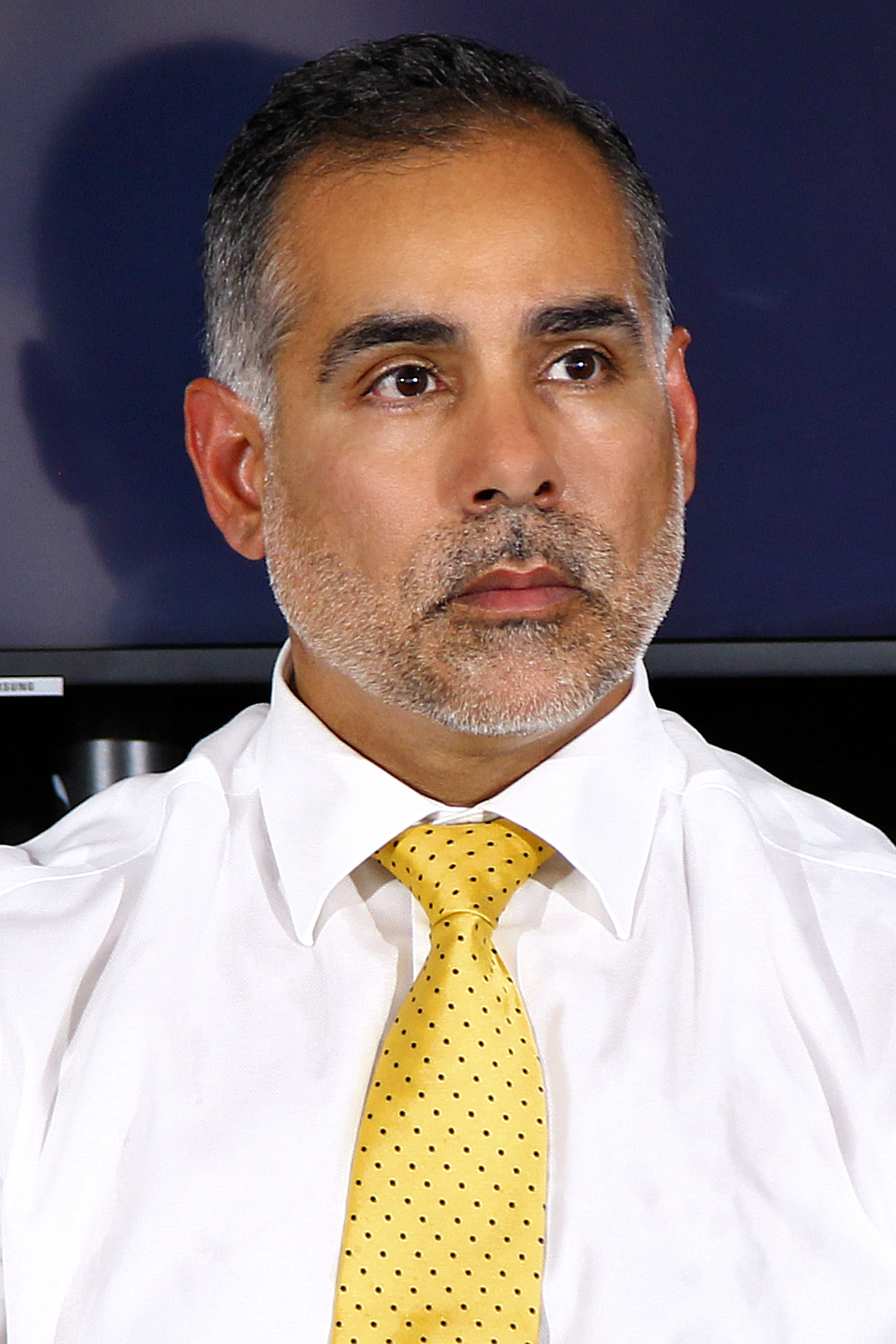

Nominee	Eddie Morales	Katherine Parker
Party	Democratic	Republican
Popular vote	21,112	16,813
Percentage	55.67%	44.33%
- County results Morales: 50–60% 60–70% 70–80% Parker: 50–60% 60–70% 70–80%
State representative before election
Eddie Morales
Democratic
Elected State representative
Eddie Morales
Democratic

First-term incumbent Democratic representative Eddie Morales had represented Texas House of Representatives 74th District since 2021. He won reelection.

74th District
Party	Candidate	Votes	%
Democratic	Eddie Morales (incumbent)	21,112	55.67%
Republican	Katherine Parker	16,813	44.33%
Total votes		37,925	100.00%

=== District 75 ===
Fifth-term incumbent Democratic representative Mary E. Gonzalez had represented Texas House of Representatives 75th District since 2013. He won reelection.

75th District
Party	Candidate	Votes	%
Democratic	Mary E. Gonzalez (incumbent)	19,371	75.91%
Libertarian	Jonathan Mullins	6,148	24.09%
Total votes		25,519	100.00%

Democratic primary
Party	Candidate	Votes	%
Democratic	Mary E. Gonzalez (incumbent)	3,418	73.4
Democratic	Rene Rodriguez	1,241	26.6
Total votes		4,659	100.00%

=== District 76 ===
First-term incumbent Democratic representative Claudia Ordaz Perez had represented Texas House of Representatives 76th District since 2021. She ran for reelection in the 79th District. By the 2020 redistricting cycle Texas House 76th District moved from El Paso County to Fort Bend County.

76th District
Party	Candidate	Votes	%
Democratic	Suleman Lalani	28,312	57.26%
Republican	Dan Mathews	21,131	42.74%
Total votes		49,443	100.00%

Democratic primary runoff
Party	Candidate	Votes	%
Democratic	Suleman Lalani	3,550	62.93%
Democratic	Vanesia Johnson	2,091	37.07%
Total votes		5,641	100.00%

Democratic primary
Party	Candidate	Votes	%
Democratic	Suleman Lalani	3,216	36.6
Democratic	Vanesia Johnson	2,172	19.3
Democratic	L. Sarah DeMerchant	1,698	19.3
Democratic	James Burnett	1,694	19.3
Total votes		8,780	100.00%

Republican primary
Party	Candidate	Votes	%
Republican	Dan Mathews	3,838	51.6
Republican	Ramesh Cherivirala	1,975	26.5
Republican	Mike Khan	1,626	21.9
Total votes		7,439	100.00%

=== District 77 ===
First-term incumbent Democratic representative Evelina Ortega had represented Texas House of Representatives 77th District since 2021. He won reelection. The new 77th District was redrawn from the old 76th District and 77th District.

77th District
Party	Candidate	Votes	%
Democratic	Evelina Ortega (incumbent)	0	100.00%
Total votes		0	100.00%
Democratic hold			

=== District 78 ===
Fifth-term incumbent Democratic representative Joe Moody had represented Texas House of Representatives 78th District since 2013. He won reelection.

78th District
Party	Candidate	Votes	%
Democratic	Joe Moody (incumbent)	0	100.00%
Total votes		0	100.00%
Democratic hold			

=== District 79 ===
First-term incumbent Democratic representative Claudia Ordaz Perez had represented Texas House of Representatives 77th District since 2021. He ran for election in the 79th District. Second-term incumbent Democratic representative Art Fierro had represented Texas House of Representatives 79th District since 2019. He lost renomination in the primary elections.

79th District
Party	Candidate	Votes	%
Democratic	Claudia Ordaz Perez	0	100.00%
Total votes		0	100.00%
Democratic hold			

Democratic primary
Party	Candidate	Votes	%
Democratic	Claudia Ordaz Perez	6,977	65.1
Democratic	Art Fierro	3,737	34.9
Total votes		10,714	100.00%

=== District 80 ===
Ninth-term incumbent Democratic representative Tracy King had represented Texas House of Representatives 80th District since 2005. He won reelection.

80th District
Party	Candidate	Votes	%
Democratic	Tracy King (incumbent)	0	100.00%
Total votes		0	100.00%
Democratic hold			

=== District 81 ===
Fourth-term incumbent Republican representative Brooks Landgraf had represented Texas House of Representatives 81st District since 2015. He won reelection.

81st District
Party	Candidate	Votes	%
Republican	Brooks Landgraf (incumbent)	0	100.00%
Total votes		0	100.00%
Republican hold			

Republican primary
Party	Candidate	Votes	%
Republican	Brooks Landgraf (incumbent)	9,343	79.4
Republican	Casey Gray	2,425	20.6
Total votes		11,768	100.00%

=== District 82 ===
27th-term incumbent Republican representative Tom Craddick had represented Texas House of Representatives 82nd District since 1969. He won reelection.

82nd District
Party	Candidate	Votes	%
Republican	Tom Craddick (incumbent)	0	100.00%
Total votes		0	100.00%
Republican hold			

=== District 83 ===
Fourth-term incumbent Republican representative Dustin Burrows had represented Texas House of Representatives 83rd District since 2015. He won reelection.

83rd District
Party	Candidate	Votes	%
Republican	Dustin Burrows (incumbent)	0	100.00%
Total votes		0	100.00%
Republican hold			

=== District 84 ===
Sixth-term incumbent Republican representative John Frullo had represented Texas House of Representatives 84th District since 2010. He did not seek reelection.

84th District
Party	Candidate	Votes	%
Republican	Carl Tepper	0	100.00%
Total votes		0	100.00%
Republican hold			

Republican primary runoff
Party	Candidate	Votes	%
Republican	Carl Tepper	4,419	58.9
Republican	David Glasheen	3,079	41.1
Total votes		7,498	100.00%

Republican primary
Party	Candidate	Votes	%
Republican	David Glasheen	4,886	41.9
Republican	Carl Tepper	4,691	40.2
Republican	Kade Wilcox	1,515	13.0
Republican	Cheryl Little	574	4.9
Total votes		11,666	100.00%

=== District 85 ===
This district was created by the 2020 redistricting cycle. West of Harris County was drawn in to this district.

85th District
Party	Candidate	Votes	%
Republican	Stan Kitzman	49,359	73.82%
Democratic	Larry Baggett	16,201	24.23%
Libertarian	Michael Miller	1,308	1.96%
Total votes			

Republican primary runoff
Party	Candidate	Votes	%
Republican	Stan Kitzman	8,136	58.0%
Republican	Phil Stephenson	5,899	42.0%
Total votes		14,035	100.00%

Republican primary
Party	Candidate	Votes	%
Republican	Phil Stephenson	8,594	40.0
Republican	Stan Kitzman	7,418	34.5
Republican	Fred Roberts	3,373	15.7
Republican	Art Hernandez	2,104	9.8
Total votes		21,489	100.00%

=== District 86 ===
19th-term incumbent Republican representative John T. Smithee had represented Texas House of Representatives 86th District since 1985. He won reelection.

86th District
Party	Candidate	Votes	%
Republican	John T. Smithee (incumbent)	0	100.00%
Total votes		0	100.00%
Republican hold			

=== District 87 ===
Sixth-term incumbent Republican representative Four Price had represented Texas House of Representatives 87th District since 2011. He won reelection.

87th District
Party	Candidate	Votes	%
Republican	Four Price (incumbent)	32,924	87.08%
Libertarian	Nick Hearn	4,887	12.92
Total votes		37,811	100.00%

=== District 88 ===
Fifth-term incumbent Republican representative Ken King had represented Texas House of Representatives 88th District since 2013. He won reelection.

88th District
Party	Candidate	Votes	%
Republican	Ken King (incumbent)	0	100.00%
Total votes		0	100.00%
Republican hold			

Republican primary
Party	Candidate	Votes	%
Republican	Ken King (incumbent)	13,556	65.0
Republican	Ted Hutto	7,292	35.0
Total votes		20,848	100.00%

=== District 89 ===
Second-term incumbent Republican representative Candy Noble had represented Texas House of Representatives 89th District since 2019. He won reelection.

89th District
Party	Candidate	Votes	%
Republican	Candy Noble (incumbent)	0	100.00%
Total votes		0	100.00%
Republican hold			

=== District 90 ===
Fourth-term incumbent Democratic representative Ramon Romero Jr. had represented Texas House of Representatives 90th District since 2015. He won reelection.

90th District
Party	Candidate	Votes	%
Democratic	Ramon Romero Jr. (incumbent)	0	100.00%
Total votes		0	100.00%
Democratic hold			

=== District 91 ===
Fifth-term incumbent Republican representative Stephanie Klick had represented Texas House of Representatives 91st District since 2013. She won reelection.

91st District
Party	Candidate	Votes	%
Republican	Stephanie Klick	0	100.00%
Total votes		0	100.00%
Republican hold			

Republican primary
Party	Candidate	Votes	%
Republican	Stephanie Klick (incumbent)	6,426	49.0
Republican	David Lowe	5,116	39.0
Republican	Anthony Reed	814	6.2
Republican	David Silvey	442	3.4
Republican	Benjamin Damico	314	2.4
Total votes		13,112	100.00%

Republican primary runoff
Party	Candidate	Votes	%
Republican	Stephanie Klick (incumbent)	4,929	54.4
Republican	David Lowe	4,140	45.6
Total votes		9,069	100.00%

=== District 92 ===
First-term incumbent Republican representative Jeff Cason had represented Texas House of Representatives 92nd District since 2021. He announced he would not seek reelection after redistricting changed his district to be more Democratic-leaning.

92nd District
Party	Candidate	Votes	%
Democratic	Salman Bhojani	20,182	58.01%
Republican	Joe Livingston	14,610	41.99%
Total votes		34,792	100.00%
Democratic gain from Republican			

Democratic primary
Party	Candidate	Votes	%
Democratic	Salman Bhojani	3,707	57.5
Democratic	Tracy Scott	1,639	25.4
Democratic	Dinesh Sharma	1,100	17.1
Total votes		6,446	100.00%

=== District 93 ===
Fifth-term incumbent Republican representative Matt Krause had represented Texas House of Representatives 93rd District since 2013. He retired to run for Tarrant County District Attorney.

93rd District
Party	Candidate	Votes	%
Republican	Nate Schatzline	34,991	59.93%
Democratic	KC Chowdhury	23,399	40.07%
Total votes		58,390	100.00%

Republican primary runoff
Party	Candidate	Votes	%
Republican	Nate Schatzline	4,806	65.0
Republican	Laura Hill	2,592	35.0
Total votes		7,398	100.00%

Republican primary
Party	Candidate	Votes	%
Republican	Nate Schatzline	4,997	43.6
Republican	Laura Hill	4,188	36.5
Republican	Cary Moon	2,279	19.9
Total votes		11,464	100.00%

=== District 94 ===
Fourth-term incumbent Republican representative Tony Tinderholt had represented Texas House of Representatives 94th District since 2013.

94th District
Party	Candidate	Votes	%
Republican	Tony Tinderholt (incumbent)	35,092	56.63%
Democratic	Dennis Sherrard	26,879	43.37%
Total votes		61,971	100.00%

=== District 95 ===
Fifth-term incumbent Democratic representative Nicole Collier had represented Texas House of Representatives 95th District since 2013.

95th District
Party	Candidate	Votes	%
Democratic	Nicole Collier (incumbent)	28,400	74.88%
Republican	Taylor Mondick	9,529	25.12%
Total votes		37,929	100.00%

=== District 96 ===
First-term incumbent Republican representative David Cook had represented Texas House of Representatives 96th District since 2021.

96th District
Party	Candidate	Votes	%
Republican	David Cook (incumbent)	0	100.00%
Total votes		0	100.00%

=== District 97 ===
Fifth-term incumbent Republican representative Craig Goldman had represented Texas House of Representatives 97th District since 2013.

97th District
Party	Candidate	Votes	%
Republican	Craig Goldman (incumbent)	37,439	58.20%
Democratic	Laurin McLaurin	26,890	41.80%
Total votes		64,329	100.00%

Democratic primary
Party	Candidate	Votes	%
Democratic	Laurin McLaurin	4,569	72.3
Democratic	Chris Rector	1,752	27.7
Total votes		6,321	100.00%

=== District 98 ===
Fifth-term incumbent Republican representative Giovanni Capriglione had represented Texas House of Representatives 98th District since 2013. He won reelection.

98th District
Party	Candidate	Votes	%
Republican	Giovanni Capriglione (incumbent)	52,385	66.27%
Democratic	Shannon Elkins	26,665	33.73%
Total votes		79,050	100.00%

Republican primary
Party	Candidate	Votes	%
Republican	Giovanni Capriglione (incumbent)	9,031	71.3
Republican	Mitchell Ryan	3,633	28.7
Total votes		12,664	100.00%

=== District 99 ===
Fifth-term incumbent Republican representative Charlie Geren had represented Texas House of Representatives 99th District since 2013. He won reelection.

99th District
Party	Candidate	Votes	%
Republican	Charlie Geren (incumbent)	33,211	61.84%
Democratic	Mimi Coffey	20,490	38.16%
Total votes		53,701	100.00%

=== District 100 ===
First-term incumbent Democratic representative Jasmine Crockett had represented Texas House of Representatives 100th District since 2021. She retired to run for Texas's 30th congressional district.

100th District
Party	Candidate	Votes	%
Democratic	Venton Jones	23,567	85.09%
Libertarian	Joe Roberts	4,131	14.91%
Total votes		27,698	100.00%
Democratic hold			

Democratic primary runoff
Party	Candidate	Votes	%
Democratic	Venton Jones	3,130	68.2
Democratic	Sandra Crenshaw	1,456	31.8
Total votes		4,586	100.00%

Democratic primary
Party	Candidate	Votes	%
Democratic	Sandra Crenshaw	2,883	34.2
Democratic	Venton Jones	2,155	25.6
Democratic	Daniel Davis Clayton	1,945	23.1
Democratic	Marquis Hawkins	1,445	17.1
Total votes		8,428	100.00%

=== District 101 ===
Fifth-term incumbent Democratic representative Chris Turner had represented Texas House of Representatives 101st District since 2013. He won reelection.

101st District
Party	Candidate	Votes	%
Democratic	Chris Turner (incumbent)	0	100.00%
Total votes		0	100.00%
Democratic hold			

=== District 102 ===
Second-term incumbent Democratic representative Ana-Maria Ramos had represented Texas House of Representatives 102nd District since 2019. She won reelection.

102nd District
Party	Candidate	Votes	%
Democratic	Ana-Maria Ramos (incumbent)	23,068	62.22%
Republican	Susan Fischer	14,007	37.78%
Total votes		37,075	100.00%
Democratic hold			

=== District 103 ===
Ninth-term incumbent Democratic representative Rafael Anchia had represented Texas House of Representatives 103rd District since 2005. He won reelection.

103rd District
Party	Candidate	Votes	%
Democratic	Rafael Anchia (incumbent)	26,783	75.52%
Independent	Alejandro Arrieta	8,681	24.48%
Total votes		35,464	100.00%
Democratic hold			

=== District 104 ===
Second-term incumbent Democratic representative Jessica Gonzalez hag represented Texas House of Representatives 104th District since 2019. She won reelection.

104th District
Party	Candidate	Votes	%
Democratic	Jessica González (incumbent)	0	100.00
Total votes		0	100.00
Democratic hold			

=== District 105 ===
Second-term incumbent Democratic representative Terry Meza had represented Texas House of Representatives 105th District since 2019. He won reelection.

105th District
Party	Candidate	Votes	%
Democratic	Terry Meza (incumbent)	17,064	55.80%
Republican	Allan E. Meagher	13,519	44.20%
Total votes		30,583	100.00%
Democratic hold			

Republican primary
Party	Candidate	Votes	%
Republican	Allan E. Meagher	3,046	63.8
Republican	Gerson Hernandez	1,728	36.2
Total votes		4,774	100.00%

=== District 106 ===
Second-term incumbent Republican representative Jared Patterson had represented Texas House of Representatives 106th District since 2019. He won reelection.

106th District
Party	Candidate	Votes	%
Republican	Jared Patterson (incumbent)	0	100.00%
Total votes		0	100.00%
Republican hold			

=== District 107 ===
Third-term incumbent Democratic representative Victoria Neave had represented Texas House of Representatives 107th District since 2017. She won reelection.

107th District
Party	Candidate	Votes	%
Democratic	Victoria Neave (incumbent)	18,702	72.88%
Libertarian	Shane Newsom	6,960	27.12%
Total votes		25,662	100.00%
Democratic hold			

=== District 108 ===
Fourth-term incumbent Republican representative Morgan Meyer had represented Texas House of Representatives 108th District since 2015. Second-term incumbent Democratic representative John Turner had represented Texas House of Representatives 114th District since 2019. He did not seek reelection after the 108th District was redrawn from the old 108th District and 114th District. Meyer won reelection.

108th District
Party	Candidate	Votes	%
Republican	Morgan Meyer (incumbent)	49,755	56.45%
Democratic	Elizabeth Ginsberg	38,390	43.55%
Total votes		88,145	100.00%
Republican hold			

Democratic primary
Party	Candidate	Votes	%
Democratic	Elizabeth Ginsberg	8,965	80.7
Democratic	Freda Heald	2,140	19.3
Total votes		11,105	100.00%

=== District 109 ===
Second-term incumbent Democratic representative Carl Sherman had represented Texas House of Representatives 109th District since 2019. He won reelection.

109th District
Party	Candidate	Votes	%
Democratic	Carl Sherman (incumbent)	0	100.00%
Total votes		0	100.00%
Democratic hold			

=== District 110 ===
Fifth-term incumbent Democratic representative Toni Rose had represented Texas House of Representatives 110th District since 2013. She won reelection.

110th District
Party	Candidate	Votes	%
Democratic	Toni Rose (incumbent)	0	100.00%
Total votes		0	100.00%
Democratic hold			

=== District 111 ===
20th-term incumbent Democratic representative Yvonne Davis had represented Texas House of Representatives 111th District since 1993. She won reelection.

111th District
Party	Candidate	Votes	%
Democratic	Yvonne Davis (incumbent)	37,610	79.12%
Republican	Benjamin Yrigollen	9,927	20.88%
Total votes		47,537	100.00%
Democratic hold			

District 112 election
- November 8, 2022
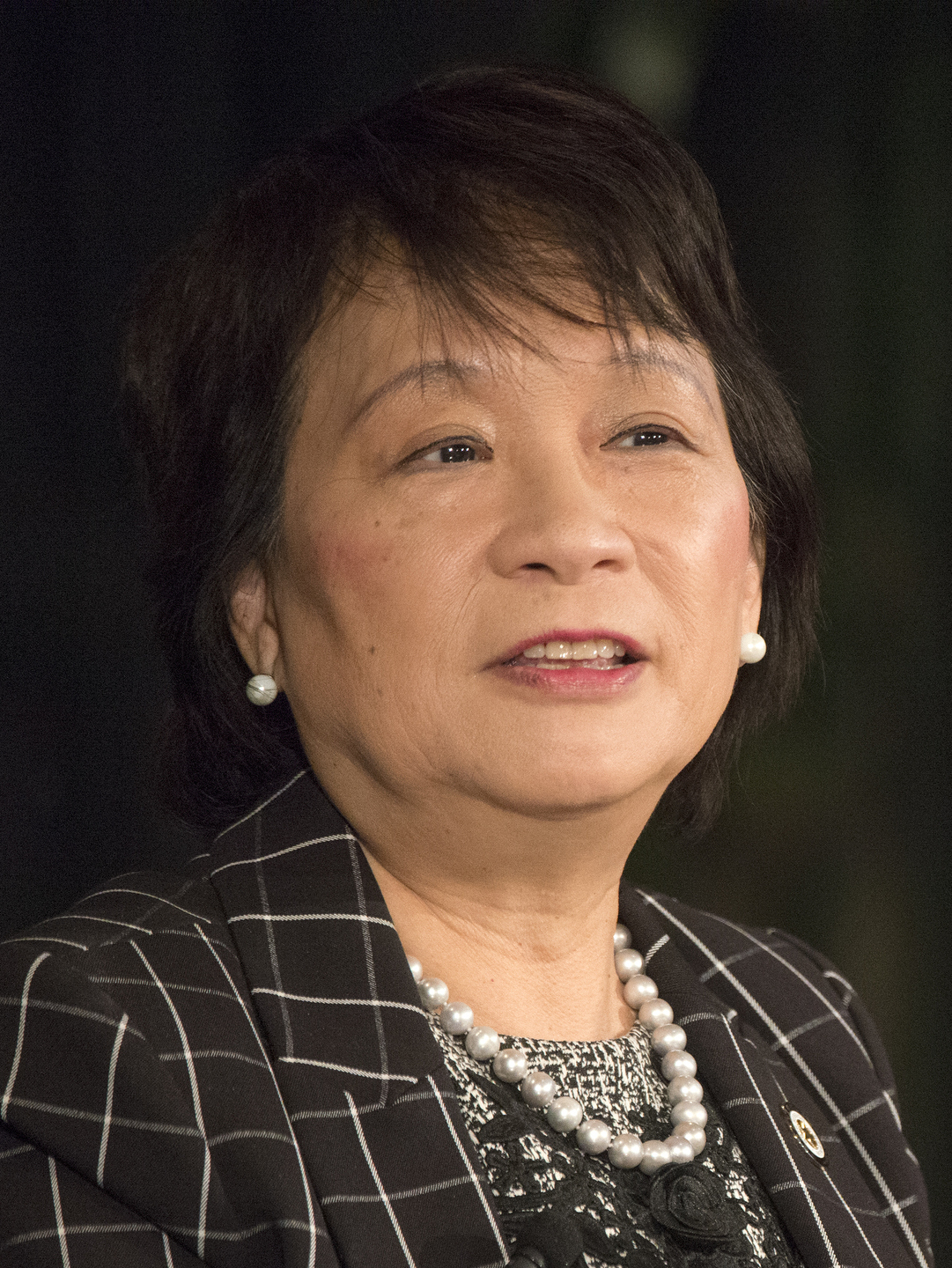

Nominee	Angie Chen Button	Elva Curl
Party	Republican	Democratic
Popular vote	37,566	30,946
Percentage	54.83%	45.17%
- Precinct results Button: 50–60% 60–70% 70–80% 80–90% Curl: 50–60% 60–70% No votes
State representative before election
Angie Chen Button
Republican
Elected State representative
Angie Chen Button
Republican

=== District 112 ===
Seventh-term incumbent Republican representative Angie Chen Button had represented Texas House of Representatives 112th District since 2009. She won reelection.

112th District
Party	Candidate	Votes	%
Republican	Angie Chen Button (incumbent)	37,566	54.83%
Democratic	Elva Curl	30,946	45.17%
Total votes		68,512	100.00%
Republican hold			

=== District 113 ===
Second-term incumbent Democratic representative Rhetta Andrews Bowers had represented Texas House of Representatives 113th District since 2019. She won reelection.

113th District
Party	Candidate	Votes	%
Democratic	Rhetta Andrews Bowers (incumbent)	0	100.00%
Total votes		0	100.00%
Democratic hold			

Democratic primary
Party	Candidate	Votes	%
Democratic	Rhetta Andrews Bowers (incumbent)	5,707	77.5
Democratic	Uduak Nkanga	1,658	22.5
Total votes		7,365	100.00%

=== District 114 ===
This district was created by the 2020 redistricting cycle. Former U.S. Representative John Bryant won the open seat.

114th District
Party	Candidate	Votes	%
Democratic	John Bryant	36,948	66.01%
Republican	Sarah Lamb	19,028	33.99%
Total votes		55,976	100.00%
Democratic hold			

Democratic primary runoff
Party	Candidate	Votes	%
Democratic	John Bryant	3,865	57.3
Democratic	Alexandra Guio	2,885	42.7
Total votes		6,750	100.00%

Democratic primary
Party	Candidate	Votes	%
Democratic	Alexandra Guio	2,857	24.7
Democratic	John Bryant	2,458	21.2
Democratic	Kendall Scudder	2,458	18.9
Democratic	Chris Leal	2,073	17.9
Democratic	Charles Gearing	2,010	17.3
Total votes		11,589	100.00%

=== District 115 ===
Second-term incumbent Democratic representative Julie Johnson had represented Texas House of Representatives 115th District since 2019. She won reelection.

115th District
Party	Candidate	Votes	%
Democratic	Julie Johnson (incumbent)	30,085	56.70%
Republican	Melisa Denis	22,973	43.30%
Total votes		53,058	100.00%
Democratic hold			

=== District 116 ===
Second-term incumbent Democratic representative Trey Martinez Fischer had represented Texas House of Representatives 116th District since 2019. He won reelection.

116th District
Party	Candidate	Votes	%
Democratic	Trey Martinez Fischer (incumbent)	0	100.00%
Total votes		0	100.00%
Democratic hold			

=== District 117 ===
Third-term incumbent Democratic representative Philip Cortez had represented Texas House of Representatives 117th District since 2017. She won reelection.

117th District
Party	Candidate	Votes	%
Democratic	Philip Cortez (incumbent)	27,821	62.20%
Republican	Aaron Schwope	16,620	37.40%
Total votes		44,441	100.00%
Democratic hold			

District 118 election
- November 8, 2022
Nominee	John Lujan	Frank Ramirez
Party	Republican	Democratic
Popular vote	26,357	24,488
Percentage	51.84%	48.16%
- Precinct results Lujan: 50–60% 60–70% 70–80% 80–90% >90% Ramirez: 50–60% 60–70% 70–80% >90% No votes
State representative before election
John Lujan
Republican
Elected State representative
John Lujan
Republican

=== District 118 ===
Incumbent Republican John Lujan was elected in a 2021 special election and had previously represented the district after winning a 2015 special election. Despite both of these victories, he had never served in the legislature due to being elected after the legislative session had finished. He won reelection in a rematch against his 2021 runoff opponent Frank Ramirez.

118th District
Party	Candidate	Votes	%
Republican	John Lujan (incumbent)	26,357	51.84%
Democratic	Frank Ramirez	24,488	48.16%
Total votes		50,845	100.00%
Republican hold			

=== District 119 ===
First-term incumbent Democratic representative Elizabeth Campos had represented Texas House of Representatives 119th District since 2021. He won reelection.

119th District
Party	Candidate	Votes	%
Democratic	Elizabeth Campos (incumbent)	29,253	78.02%
Libertarian	Arthur Thomas IV	8,243	21.98%
Total votes		37,496	100.00%

=== District 120 ===
Third-term incumbent Democratic representative Barbara Gervin-Hawkins had represented Texas House of Representatives 120th District since 2017. He won reelection.

120th District
Party	Candidate	Votes	%
Democratic	Barbara Gervin-Hawkins (incumbent)	26,413	67.50%
Republican	Ronald Payne	12,718	32.50%
Total votes		39,131	100.00%

=== District 121 ===
Second-term incumbent Republican representative Steve Allison had represented Texas House of Representatives 121st District since 2019. He won reelection.

121st District
Party	Candidate	Votes	%
Republican	Steve Allison (incumbent)	42,469	55.02%
Democratic	Becca Moyer DeFelice	34,721	44.98%
Total votes		77,190	100.00%

Democratic primary
Party	Candidate	Votes	%
Democratic	Becca Moyer DeFelice	6,771	79.1
Democratic	Gabrien Gregory	1,793	20.9
Total votes		8,564	100.00%

Republican primary
Party	Candidate	Votes	%
Republican	Steve Allison (incumbent)	8,249	85.6
Republican	Michael Champion	1,387	14.4
Total votes		9,636	100.00%

=== District 122 ===
Sixth-term incumbent Republican representative Lyle Larson had represented Texas House of Representatives 122nd District since 2011. He did not seek reelection.

122nd District
Party	Candidate	Votes	%
Republican	Mark Dorazio	47,804	56.02%
Democratic	Angi Aramburu	35,105	41.14%
Libertarian	Stephanie Berlin	2,420	2.84%
Total votes		85,329	100.00%

Republican primary runoff
Party	Candidate	Votes	%
Republican	Mark Dorazio	7,959	54.9
Republican	Elisa Chan	6,529	45.1
Total votes		14,488	100.00%

Republican primary
Party	Candidate	Votes	%
Republican	Elisa Chan	7,344	37.0
Republican	Mark Dorazio	5,465	23.4
Republican	Adam Blanchard	4,645	23.4
Republican	Mark Cuthbert	2,418	12.2
Total votes		19,872	100.00%

=== District 123 ===
Fourth-term incumbent Democratic representative Diego Bernal had represented Texas House of Representatives 123rd District since 2015. He won reelection.

123rd District
Party	Candidate	Votes	%
Democratic	Diego Bernal (incumbent)	34,414	66.76%
Republican	Charlotte Valdez	17,138	33.24%
Total votes		51,552	100.00%

=== District 124 ===
Fourth-term incumbent Democratic representative Ina Minjarez had represented Texas House of Representatives 124th District since 2015. She retired to run for Bexar County Commissioners Court Judge.

124th District
Party	Candidate	Votes	%
Democratic	Josey Garcia	23,633	66.99%
Republican	Johnny Arredondo	11,643	33.01%
Total votes		35,276	100.00%

Democratic primary
Party	Candidate	Votes	%
Democratic	Josey Garcia	4,887	69.9
Democratic	Gerald Brian Lopez	1,576	22.5
Democratic	Steven Gilmore	526	7.5
Total votes		6,989	100.00%

=== District 125 ===
Second-term incumbent Democratic representative Ray Lopez had represented Texas House of Representatives 125th District since 2019. He won reelection.

125th District
Party	Candidate	Votes	%
Democratic	Ray Lopez (incumbent)	34,762	62.41%
Republican	Carlos Antonio Raymond	20,933	37.59%
Total votes		55,695	100.00%

Democratic primary
Party	Candidate	Votes	%
Democratic	Ray Lopez (incumbent)	5,853	58.1
Democratic	Eric Michael Garza	4,226	41.9
Total votes		10,079	100.00%

=== District 126 ===
Second-term incumbent Republican representative Sam Harless had represented Texas House of Representatives 126th District since 2019. He won reelection.

126th District
Party	Candidate	Votes	%
Republican	Sam Harless (incumbent)	0	100.00%
Total votes		0	100.00%
Republican hold			

=== District 127 ===
Sixth-term incumbent Republican representative Dan Huberty had represented Texas House of Representatives 127th District since 2011. He did not seek reelection.

127th District
Party	Candidate	Votes	%
Republican	Charles Cunningham	0	100.00%
Total votes		0	100.00%
Republican hold			

Republican primary
Party	Candidate	Votes	%
Republican	Charles Cunningham	7,236	80.7
Republican	Deanna Robertson	1,732	19.3
Total votes		8,968	100.00%

=== District 128 ===
Third-term incumbent Republican representative Briscoe Cain had represented Texas House of Representatives 128th District since 2017. He won reelection.

128th District
Party	Candidate	Votes	%
Republican	Briscoe Cain (incumbent)	32,465	70.49%
Democratic	Charles Crews	13,594	29.51%
Total votes		46,059	100.00%

=== District 129 ===
Fourth-term incumbent Republican representative Dennis Paul had represented Texas House of Representatives 129th District since 2015. He won reelection.

129th District
Party	Candidate	Votes	%
Republican	Dennis Paul (incumbent)	39,062	60.79%
Democratic	Kat Marvel	25,194	39.21%
Total votes		64,256	100.00

=== District 130 ===
Third-term incumbent Republican representative Briscoe Cain had represented Texas House of Representatives 130th District since 2017. He won reelection.

130th District
Party	Candidate	Votes	%
Republican	Tom Oliverson (incumbent)	0	100.00%
Total votes		0	100.00%
Republican hold			

=== District 131 ===
Ninth-term incumbent Democratic representative Alma A. Allen had represented Texas House of Representatives 131st District since 2009. He won reelection.

131st District
Party	Candidate	Votes	%
Democratic	Alma A. Allen (incumbent)	25,066	80.52%
Republican	Gerry Monroe	6,063	19.48%
Total votes		31,129	100.00%

Democratic primary
Party	Candidate	Votes	%
Democratic	Alma A. Allen (incumbent)	4,461	53.9
Democratic	James Guillory	2,677	32.4
Democratic	Crystal Dillard	1,132	13.7
Total votes		8,270	100.00%

=== District 132 ===
First-term incumbent Republican representative Mike Schofield had represented Texas House of Representatives 132nd District since 2021. He won reelection.

132nd District
Party	Candidate	Votes	%
Republican	Mike Schofield (incumbent)	36,322	59.74%
Democratic	Cameron Campbell	24,483	40.26%
Total votes		60,805	100.00%

Democratic primary
Party	Candidate	Votes	%
Democratic	Cameron Campbell	2,505	52.7
Democratic	Chase West	2,245	47.3
Total votes		4,750	100.00%

Republican primary
Party	Candidate	Votes	%
Republican	Mike Schofield (incumbent)	5,703	92.2
Republican	Erik Le	485	7.8
Total votes		6,188	100.00%

=== District 133 ===
Sixth-term incumbent Republican representative Jim Murphy had represented Texas House of Representatives 133rd District since 2011. He ran for reelection, but withdrew before the Republican primary.

133rd District
Party	Candidate	Votes	%
Republican	Mano Deayala	36,849	61.44%
Democratic	Mohamad Maarouf	21,826	36.39%
Libertarian	James Harren	1,297	2.16%
Total votes		59,972	100.00%

Republican primary runoff
Party	Candidate	Votes	%
Republican	Mano Deayala	7,110	51.1
Republican	Shelley Torian Barineau	6,806	48.9
Total votes		13,916	100.00%

Republican primary
Party	Candidate	Votes	%
Republican	Mano Deayala	4,313	28.4
Republican	Shelley Torian Barineau	4,102	27.1
Republican	Greg Travis	3,525	23.3
Republican	Will Franklin	2,006	13.2
Republican	Bert Keller	1,215	8.0
Total votes		15,161	100.00%

=== District 134 ===
First-term incumbent Democratic representative Ann Johnson had represented Texas House of Representatives 134th District since 2021. She won reelection.

134th District
Party	Candidate	Votes	%
Democratic	Ann Johnson (incumbent)	49,688	61.56%
Republican	Ryan McConnico	29,968	37.13%
Libertarian	Carol Unsicke	1,058	1.31%
Total votes		80,714	100.00%

Republican primary
Party	Candidate	Votes	%
Republican	Ryan McConnico	6,398	75.2
Republican	A. A. Dominquez	2,115	24.8
Total votes		8,513	100.00%

=== District 135 ===
Second-term incumbent Democratic representative Jon Rosenthal had represented Texas House of Representatives 135th District since 2019. He won reelection.

135th District
Party	Candidate	Votes	%
Democratic	Jon Rosenthal (incumbent)	23,354	57.62%
Republican	Stephen Hagerty	17,178	42.38%
Total votes		40,532	100.00%

Republican primary
Party	Candidate	Votes	%
Republican	Stephen Hagerty	2,080	51.4
Republican	Michael May	1,966	48.6
Total votes		4,046	100.00%

=== District 136 ===
Second-term incumbent Democratic representative John Bucy III had represented Texas House of Representatives 136th District since 2019. He won reelection.

136th District
Party	Candidate	Votes	%
Democratic	John Bucy III (incumbent)	36,137	61.32%
Republican	Michelle Evans	21,240	36.04%
Libertarian	Burton Culley	1,552	2.63%
Total votes		58,929	100.00%

Republican primary
Party	Candidate	Votes	%
Republican	Michelle Evans	4,342	83.4
Republican	Amin Salahuddin	864	16.6
Total votes		5,206	100.00%

=== District 137 ===
Fifth-term incumbent Democratic representative Gene Wu had represented Texas House of Representatives 137th District since 2013. He won reelection.

137th District
Party	Candidate	Votes	%
Democratic	Gene Wu (incumbent)	14,451	76.02%
Libertarian	Lee Sharp	4,559	23.98%
Total votes		19,010	100.00%

=== District 138 ===
First-term incumbent Republican representative Lacey Hull had represented Texas House of Representatives 138th District since 2021. He won reelection.

138th District
Party	Candidate	Votes	%
Republican	Lacey Hull (incumbent)	32,395	57.09%
Democratic	Stephanie Morales	24,353	42.91%
Total votes		56,748	100.00%

Republican primary
Party	Candidate	Votes	%
Republican	Lacey Hull (incumbent)	4,774	66.7
Republican	Josh Flynn	1,315	18.4
Republican	Christine Kalmbach	1,068	14.9
Total votes		7,157	100.00%

=== District 139 ===
Fourth-term incumbent Democratic representative Jarvis Johnson had represented Texas House of Representatives 139th District since 2016. He won reelection.

139th District
Party	Candidate	Votes	%
Democratic	Jarvis Johnson (incumbent)	0	100.00%
Total votes		0	100.00%
Democratic hold			

=== District 140 ===
Seventh-term incumbent Democratic representative Jarvis Johnson had represented Texas House of Representatives 140th District since 2009. He won reelection.

140th District
Party	Candidate	Votes	%
Democratic	Armando Walle (incumbent)	0	100.00%
Total votes		0	100.00%
Democratic hold			

=== District 141 ===
25th-term incumbent Democratic representative Senfronia Thompson had represented Texas House of Representatives 141st District since 1973. He won reelection.

141st District
Party	Candidate	Votes	%
Democratic	Senfronia Thompson (incumbent)	0	100.00%
Total votes		0	100.00%
Democratic hold			

=== District 142 ===
19th-term incumbent Democratic representative Harold Dutton Jr. had represented Texas House of Representatives 142nd District since 1985. He won reelection.

142nd District
Party	Candidate	Votes	%
Democratic	Harold Dutton Jr. (incumbent)	0	100.00%
Total votes		0	100.00%

Democratic primary
Party	Candidate	Votes	%
Democratic	Harold Dutton Jr. (incumbent)	4,077	50.8
Democratic	Candis Houston	3,941	49.2
Total votes		8,018	100.00%

=== District 143 ===
Ninth-term incumbent Democratic representative Ana Hernandez had represented Texas House of Representatives 143rd District since 2005. She won reelection.

143rd District
Party	Candidate	Votes	%
Democratic	Ana Hernandez (incumbent)	0	100.00%
Total votes		0	100.00%
Democratic hold			

=== District 144 ===
Third-term incumbent Democratic representative Mary Ann Perez had represented Texas House of Representatives 144th District since 2005. She won reelection.

144th District
Party	Candidate	Votes	%
Democratic	Mary Ann Perez (incumbent)	0	100.00%
Total votes		0	100.00%
Democratic hold			

=== District 145 ===
Second-term incumbent Democratic representative Christina Morales had represented Texas House of Representatives 145th District since 2005. She won reelection.

145th District
Party	Candidate	Votes	%
Democratic	Christina Morales (incumbent)	32,292	71.33%
Republican	Michael Mabry	12,979	28.67%
Total votes		45,271	100.00%

=== District 146 ===
Third-term incumbent Democratic representative Shawn Thierry had represented Texas House of Representatives 146th District since 2017. She won reelection.

146th District
Party	Candidate	Votes	%
Democratic	Shawn Thierry (incumbent)	0	100.00%
Total votes		0	100.00%
Democratic hold			

=== District 147 ===
16th-term incumbent Democratic representative Garnet Coleman had represented Texas House of Representatives 146th District since 2017. He resigned in February 2022. Republican Damien Thaddeus Jones suspended his campaign before winning the nomination and did not appear on the general election ballot.

147th District
Party	Candidate	Votes	%
Democratic	Jolanda Jones	0	100.00%
Total votes		0	100.00%
Democratic hold			

Democratic primary runoff
Party	Candidate	Votes	%
Democratic	Jolanda Jones	3,588	53.7
Democratic	Danielle Keys Bess	3,092	46.3
Total votes		6,680	100.00%

Democratic primary
Party	Candidate	Votes	%
Democratic	Jolanda Jones	4,650	41.3
Democratic	Danielle Keys Bess	2,239	19.9
Democratic	Reagan Flowers	1,975	17.5
Democratic	Aurelia Wagner	972	8.6
Democratic	Namrata Subramanian	791	7.0
Democratic	Somtoochukwu Ik-Ejiofor	363	3.2
Democratic	Akwete Hines	281	2.5
Total votes		11,271	100.00%

Republican primary
Party	Candidate	Votes	%
Republican	Damien Thaddeus Jones	1,099	53.7
Republican	Rashard Baylor	947	46.3
Total votes		2,046	100.00%

=== District 148 ===
First-term incumbent Democratic representative Penny Morales Shaw had represented Texas House of Representatives 148th District since 2021. She won reelection.

148th District
Party	Candidate	Votes	%
Democratic	Penny Morales Shaw (incumbent)	20,456	55.52%
Republican	Kay Smith	15,691	42.59%
Libertarian	R. Grizzle Trojacek	697	1.89%
Total votes		36,844	100.00%

=== District 149 ===
Ninth-term incumbent Democratic representative Hubert Vo had represented Texas House of Representatives 149th District since 2005. He won reelection.

149th District
Party	Candidate	Votes	%
Democratic	Hubert Vo (incumbent)	19,034	59.84%
Republican	Lily Truong	11,975	37.65%
Libertarian	Braxton Bogue	799	2.51%
Total votes		31,808	100.00%

=== District 150 ===
Third-term incumbent Republican representative Valoree Swanson had represented Texas House of Representatives 150th District since 2017. She won reelection.

150th District
Party	Candidate	Votes	%
Republican	Valoree Swanson (incumbent)	34,842	60.70%
Democratic	Ginny Brown Daniel	22,558	39.30%
Total votes		57,400	100.00%

Republican primary
Party	Candidate	Votes	%
Republican	Valoree Swanson (incumbent)	6,538	68.9
Republican	Debbie Riddle	2,417	25.5
Republican	Valerie McGilvrey	284	3.0
Republican	Bryan Le	245	2.6
Total votes		9,484	100.00%

== See also ==
- 2022 United States House of Representatives elections in Texas
- 2022 Texas gubernatorial election
- 2022 United States state legislative elections
- 2022 Texas State Senate election
- 2022 Texas elections
