= Dennis Geesaman =

American politician

Member-elect of the Texas House of Representatives from the 85th district
- Assuming office January 2027
- Succeeding: Stan Kitzman

Personal details
- Party: Republican

Dennis Geesaman, nicknamed "Goose", is an American politician. A member of the Republican Party, he is the member-elect for the 85th district of the Texas House of Representatives.
