= Alfred P.C. Petsch =

American politician (1887–1981)

Member of the Texas House of Representatives for Texas's 85th House of Representatives district
- In office 1935–1941
- Preceded by: Bodo Holekamp
- Succeeded by: Lawrence L. Bruhl

Member of the Texas House of Representatives for Texas's 85th House of Representatives district
- In office 1925–1933
- Preceded by: Samuel Ealy Johnson, Jr.
- Succeeded by: Bodo Holekamp

Personal details
- Born: August 16, 1887 Luckenbach, Texas
- Died: November 28, 1981 (aged 94) Fredericksburg, Texas
- Resting place: Greenwood Cemetery
- Party: Democratic
- Spouse: Myra Slator
- Children: Two
- Education: Texas State University-San Marcos; University of Texas School of Law

Military service
- Branch/service: United States Army
- Rank: Lieutenant Colonel
- Battles/wars: World War I World War II

Alfred P. C. Petsch (1887–1981) was a Democratic member of the Texas House of Representatives for the 85th District of Fredericksburg and Gillespie County. He was a retired lieutenant colonel who saw service in both World War I and World War II. Petsch was also an educator, a lawyer, a civic leader and a philanthropist.

== Early years ==
Alfred Petsch was born on August 16, 1887, in Luckenbach, Texas, to Joe F. and Ida (Baag) Petsch. As was the custom among Germans of the Texas Hill Country of that era, Petsch grew up speaking only Texas German, and did not learn English until he attended college outside the community.

== Education and early career ==
Petsch graduated in 1906 from Southwest Texas State Normal School in San Marcos. Petsch worked as a school teacher to fund his education. From 1906 to 1907, and the fall semester of 1908, Petsch attended the University of Texas, graduating from University of Texas School of Law in 1910 and passing the State Bar of Texas exam that same year. In 1934, Petsch was licensed to practice before the United States Supreme Court.

Petsch opened his first law office in Fredericksburg on January 1, 1911.

== Military service ==
Petsch was commissioned a second lieutenant during World War I on May 26, 1917. He served at Camp Funston, at Camp Travis (later absorbed by Fort Sam Houston), and at Camp Grant in Rockford, Illinois, where he was discharged on December 3, 1918, with the rank of major of infantry. In 1919 he received an appointment as major in the Infantry Reserve. During World War II, Lieutenant Colonel Petsch served at Camp Bullis (1942–43), the Hereford Internment Camp (1943), and Camp Joseph T. Robinson, North Little Rock, Arkansas (1943–45).

== Legislative career ==
Petsch was appointed Gillespie County Attorney, March 1911.

He was a Democrat, 85th District, Fredericksburg, Gillespie County, elected in 1924 to the Texas House of Representatives, succeeding Samuel Ealy Johnson, Jr. He was reelected in subsequent terms until 1933. Petch was again elected in 1935, serving until 1941.

=== Committee assignments for Representative Alfred P.C. Petsch ===
Source: Legislative Reference Library of Texas

39th R.S. – 1925 (Jan 13, 1925 – Jan 11, 1927)
- Criminal Jurisprudence
- Game and Fisheries (chair)
- Highways and Motor Traffic
- Judiciary
- State Departments, Investigate

40th R.S. – 1927 (Jan 11, 1927 – Jan 8, 1929)
- Appropriations
- Bribery Charges Against Representatives Dale and Moore, Investigation, Special
- Criminal Jurisprudence (chair)
- Game and Fisheries
- Highways and Motor Traffic

41st R.S. – 1929 (Jan 8, 1929 – Jan 13, 1931)
- Congressional Districts
- Criminal Jurisprudence
- Erection of State Highway Building, Investigate
- Game and Fisheries
- General Land Office Investigation
- Highways and Motor Traffic
- Military Affairs
- Oil and Gas Leases, Investigate

42nd R.S. – 1931 (Jan 13, 1931 – Jan 10, 1933)
- Criminal Jurisprudence (chair)
- Game and Fisheries
- Highways and Motor Traffic
- Military Affairs
- Mineral Resources in River Beds, Investigate
- Moody Chair Purchase, Investigate

44th R.S. – 1935 (Jan 8, 1935 – Jan 12, 1937)
- Common Carriers
- Criminal Jurisprudence
- House Bill 8 Irregularities, Special (chair)
- Live Stock and Stock Raising
- Public Health
- State Departments and Permanent School Fund, Special

45th R.S. – 1937 (Jan 12, 1937 – Jan 10, 1939)
- Common Carriers
- Constitutional Amendments
- Criminal Jurisprudence
- Crude Oil Prices, Special
- Department of Education
- Expenditures of Rural Aid Appropriations, Special
- Judiciary
- Liquor Traffic
- Rules (chair)

46th R.S. – 1939 (Jan 10, 1939 – Jan 14, 1941)
- Constitutional Amendments
- Criminal Jurisprudence
- Insurance Rates
- Investment of Permanent School Fund for State Building, Special
- Liquor Traffic
- Military Affairs (chair)
- Revenue and Taxation

== Newspaper ==
In 1915, the Fredericksburg Standard was purchased by the Fredericksburg Publishing Company, which also published the German language newspaper Fredericksburg Wochenblatt. Petsch was a founding member and director of the publishing company, as well as a contributor of a weekly newspaper column titled We Believe.

== Civic participation ==
As a member of the Fredericksburg Progressive Business League, he worked in 1913 to bring a railroad to Fredericksburg. Petsch served on the Fredericksburg school board, and was president of the Fredericksburg Chamber of Commerce 1923–24. He helped reorganize the Gillespie County Fair Association in 1922. Petsch was one of the organizers of the Hill Country Bar Association.

After Citizens Bank and Bank of Fredericksburg closed their doors in 1932 during the Great Depression, a committee was formed to organize a new bank to serve the needs of the community. Petch served on the organizing committee, along with H.H. Sagebiel, E.H. Riley, H.A. Ries, W.H. Schaefer, Eric Juenke, Edward Stein, W.J. Schroeder, John W. Metzger, and M.L. Bogisch. The new bank opened its doors as Fredericksburg National Bank on April 6, 1932. Petsch served on the board of directors from its founding, as chairman of the board from 1969 to 1979, and as the bank's attorney.

Petsch, a friend of Lyndon Johnson and his wife Lady Bird Johnson, was a major financial contributor to Lady Bird Johnson Park. He helped to organize the Hill Country Memorial Hospital and served on its board of directors during planning and construction. He was also a contributing force to the development of the Fleet Admiral Chester W. Nimitz Naval Museum.

Colonel and Mrs. Petsch were influential members of many local civic organizations, such as the non-profit Hill Country Student Help scholarship entity, the Community Chest, and the local 4-H youth organization. They were made honorary lifetime members of the Parent-Teacher Association in 1968. On September 28, 1969, Fredericksburg celebrated Alfred and Myra Petsch Day. The Alfred and Myra Petsch Appreciation Dinner, which drew 500 people at $2.50 a ticket, was held at the Fair Park Exhibition Hall. President and Mrs. Lyndon B. Johnson shared the head table with the Petsches.

== Personal life and death ==
Alfred Petsch married Myra Slator on May 3, 1918, at St. Mark's Episcopal Church in San Antonio. The couple had two children.

He retired from his law practice in 1980 and died on November 28, 1981, in Fredericksburg. He was buried in Greenwood Cemetery.

== Memberships ==
- Order of the Eastern Star
- Alfazar Temple of the Mystic Shrine, San Antonio (founding member)
- The Imperial Shrine
- Rotary Club
- Masonic Lodge

Texas House of Representatives
Preceded by Samuel Ealy Johnson, Jr.	Member of the Texas House of Representatives from District 85 (Fredericksburg); 1925–1933	Succeeded by Bodo Holekamp
Preceded by Bodo Holekamp	Member of the Texas House of Representatives from District 85 (Fredericksburg); 1935–1941	Succeeded by Lawrence L. Bruhl
