= Gina Calanni =

American politician and author

Gina Nicole Calanni
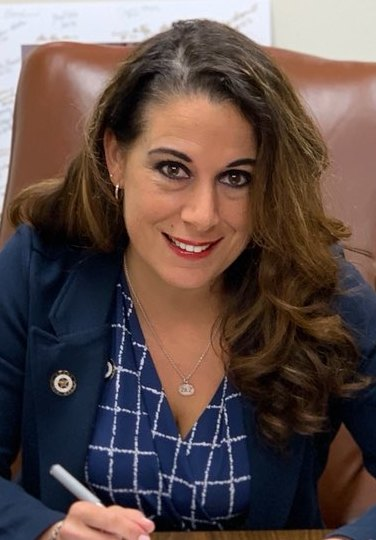

Member of the Texas House of Representatives from the 132nd district
- In office January 8, 2019 – January 12, 2021
- Preceded by: Mike Schofield
- Succeeded by: Mike Schofield

Personal details
- Born: December 17, 1977 (age 48) Austin, Texas, US
- Party: Democratic

Gina Nicole Calanni (born December 17, 1977) is a former Democratic member of the Texas House of Representatives from House District 132 in the western part of Harris County, including Katy, Cypress, and West Houston. On November 6, 2018, she defeated two-term Republican incumbent Mike Schofield—to whom she later lost in a reelection bid—and became the first woman to represent Texas House District 132.

== Biography ==
Born in Austin, Calanni was adopted shortly after her birth. She lived in several states and overseas during her father Joseph Calanni's military career. He served as a member of the Old Guard. As an adult, she found her birth family through social media.

Calanni graduated from Ellison High School in Killeen. In 2005, she received a Bachelor of Arts degree in political science from St. Edward's University, after attending the University of Texas in Arlington. She holds a paralegal certificate from the University of North Texas. While attending the University of Texas at Arlington, Calanni obtained her Master Scuba Diver certification. She has worked as a paralegal and as a finance director.

Calanni has three sons enrolled in Katy ISD schools. They encouraged her to run for office, and were present for her swearing in ceremony. In 2014, she was offered a multi-book contract with Harper Collins, and she completed her first marathon.

In 2017, Calanni served as a gala chairperson for the Elijah Rising. She continues to volunteer with other organizations that combat human trafficking and Habitat for Humanity.

== Political career ==
On November 6, 2018, Calanni unseated Republican incumbent Mike Schofield by 49.21 to 49.14 percent. She was the first woman to represent House District 132. During her campaign and tenure as a Texas state representative, she made public school funding, teacher pay, and property tax reform her main priorities.

During the 86th Legislative Session, Calanni authored a bill to limit severance packages of school superintendents that resign to one year's salary. An advocate for access to healthcare, Calanni supported an amendment to Senate Bill 22, and shared personal testimony of having cervical cancer, that would have been identified earlier if she had been able to afford the doctor visit.

Calanni passed eleven bills during the 86th Legislative Session, including a bill to allow the Katy Police Department to enforce overweight, commercial vehicle standards. At one of her town halls, Calanni highlighted House Bill 3845, which she authored and successfully passed. Before passage of this legislation, forensic analysts were required to travel to various cities and counties to testify in judicial proceedings in-person, taking away from their casework.

Texas House of Representatives
Preceded by Mike Schofield	Member of the Texas House of Representatives for the 132nd district 2019 - 2021	Succeeded by Mike Schofield
