= Stan Kitzman =

American politician

Member of the Texas House of Representatives from the 85th district
- Incumbent
- Assumed office January 10, 2023
- Preceded by: Phil Stephenson
- Succeeded by: Dennis Geesaman (elect)

Personal details
- Party: Republican

Stan Kitzman is an American politician. He serves as a Republican member for the 85th district of the Texas House of Representatives. He graduated from Royal High School and Texas A&M University with a Bachelor of Science in 1988 and served in the Texas Army National Guard, retiring as a staff sergeant after 21 years.

In March 2022, Kitzman defeated Fred Roberts and Art Hernandez in the Republican primary election for the 85th district of the Texas House of Representatives. In May 2022, he defeated Phil Stephenson in the Republican primary runoff election. In November 2022, Kitzman defeated Larry Baggett and Michael Miller in the general election, winning 73 percent of the votes. He succeeded Stephenson and assumed office on January 10, 2023.

On March 3, 2026, former Flatonia Mayor Dennis Geesaman defeated Kitzman in the Republican primary. Geesaman was backed by Veterans for America First, Texas Gun Rights, and the True Texas Project, including Tim Dunn groups, while Kitzman was endorsed by Donald Trump, Greg Abbott, Rick Perry, and Ted Cruz. Gessaman won with 15,147 votes (57.4%) to Kitzman's 11,225 (42.6%). Kitzman responded to these results with a statement, saying, "I want to congratulate Dennis Geesaman on his victory and wish him success as he represents the district."
