= Angelia Orr =

American politician (born 1969)

Member of the Texas House of Representatives from the 13th district
- Incumbent
- Assumed office January 10, 2023
- Preceded by: Ben Leman

Personal details
- Born: October 3, 1969 (age 57)
- Party: Republican
- Spouse: Will
- Education: Texas A&M University
- Occupation: Businesswoman

Angelia Orr (born October 3, 1969) is an American politician and small business owner who is a Republican member of the Texas House of Representatives for district 13.

Orr was formerly the District Clerk of Hill County.

Texas House of Representatives
Preceded by Ben Leman	Member of the Texas House of Representatives from the 13th district 2023–present	Incumbent
