= Texas's 85th House of Representatives district =

American legislative district

Texas's 85th State House of Representatives district
Representative
Stan Kitzman; R–Pattison

District 85 is a district in the Texas House of Representatives. It has been represented by Republican Stan Kitzman since 2023.

== Geography ==
The district contains the counties of Austin, Colorado, Fayette, Fort Bend, Waller and Wharton.

== Members ==
=== 20th century ===
- William Alexander Black (until 1923)
- Samuel Ealy Johnson Jr. (January 9, 1923 – September 1, 1923)
- Alfred P. C. Petsch (1925–1933)
- Bodo Holekamp (1933–1935)
- Alfred P. C. Petsch (1935–1941)
- Lawrence L. Bruhl (after 1941)

=== 21st century ===
- Joe Heflin (until 2011)
- Jim Landtroop (2011–2013)
- Phil Stephenson (2013–2023)
- Stan Kitzman (since 2023)
