= David Spiller =

British pop artist

David Spiller (28 August 1942 - 5 June 2018) was a British artist whose work was influenced by Pop Art and often featured Disney cartoon characters.
