= Mike Schofield =

American politician

Member of the Texas House of Representatives from the 132nd district
- Incumbent
- Assumed office January 12, 2021
- Preceded by: Gina Calanni
- In office January 13, 2015 – January 8, 2019
- Preceded by: Bill Callegari
- Succeeded by: Gina Calanni

Personal details
- Born: Michael Joseph Schofield; June 27, 1964 (age 62)
- Party: Republican

Michael Joseph Schofield (born June 27, 1964) is a Texas politician who currently represents district 132 of the Texas House of Representatives composed of Katy, Texas and part of Cy-Fair. A member of the Republican Party, he previously served 11 years as an advisor to Governor Rick Perry.

== Personal life ==
Michael J. Schofield was born on June 27, 1964.

== Political career ==
For 11 years Schofield served as an advisor to Governor Rick Perry.

Elected as a Republican, Schofield was sworn in on January 13, 2015, and would later be unseated by Democrat Gina Calanni to represent district 132 of the Texas House of Representatives. In 2020, he won the seat back. The district composes of Katy and part of Cy-Fair in Harris County, Texas.

During his tenure in the Texas House, he has been involved with some major pieces of legislation. In 2017, he drafted a constitutional amendment to the Texas Constitution banning income tax, ultimately passing in 2019. In 2015, he was named "Freshman Legislator of the Year."
