= Phil Stephenson (politician) =

Texas legislator

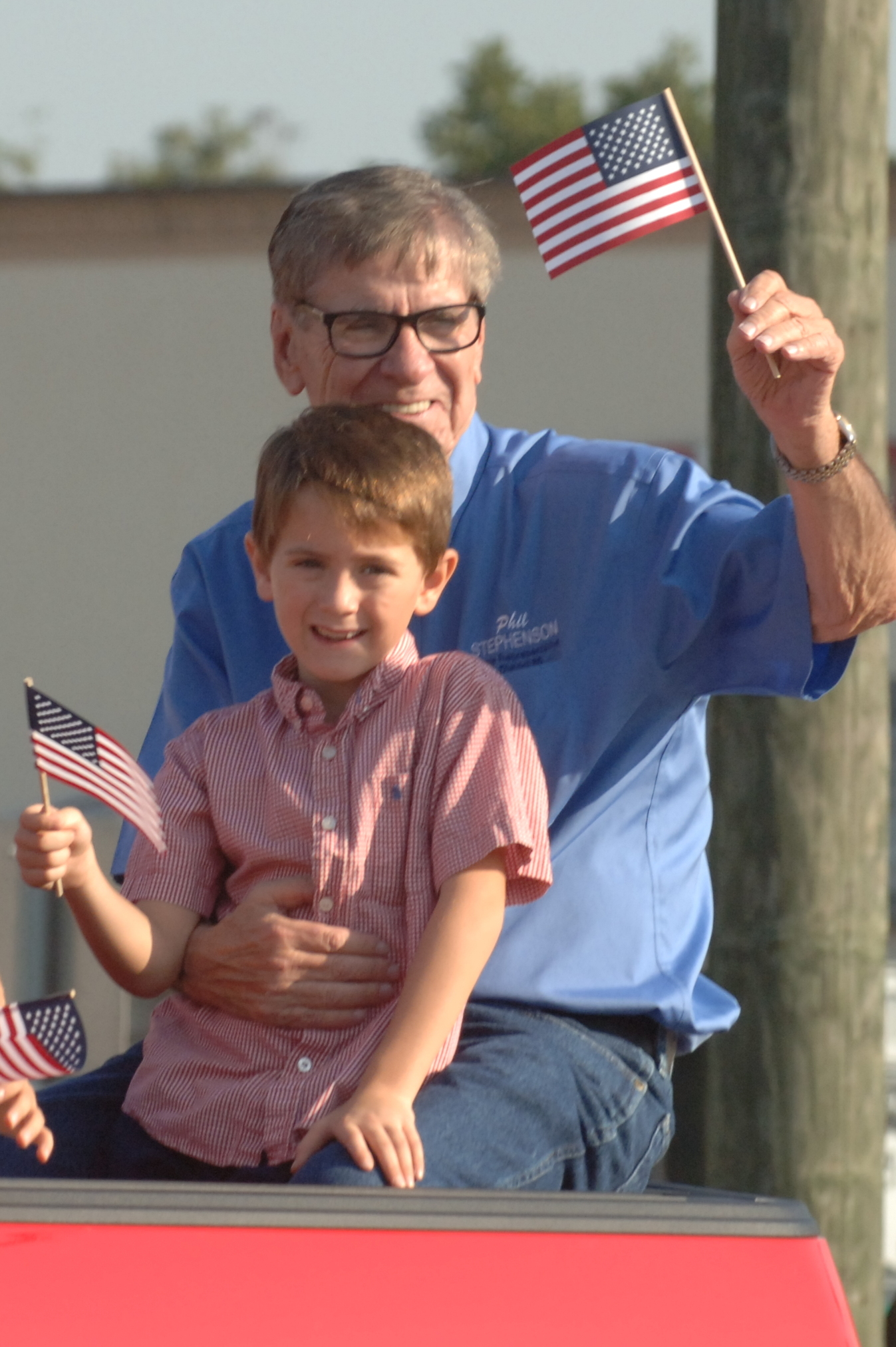
- Stephenson in 2017

Member of the Texas House of Representatives from the 85th district
- In office January 8, 2013 – January 10, 2023
- Preceded by: Jim Landtroop
- Succeeded by: Stan Kitzman

Personal details
- Born: Phyllip Wayne Stephenson; February 5, 1945 (age 81) Duncan, Oklahoma, U.S.
- Party: Republican
- Spouses: Barbara (m. 1973; died 2016); Sue (m. 2019)
- Children: 2
- Education: Texas Tech University (BBA)
- Occupation: Accountant
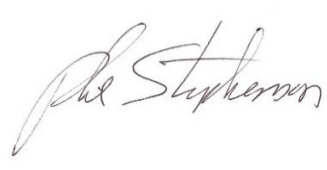
- Signature
- Website: Official website

Phyllip Wayne Stephenson (born February 5, 1945) is an American accountant and politician. He represented the 85th District in the Texas House of Representatives from 2013 to 2023. A member of the Republican Party, Stephenson has also served as an accountant at his own firm since 1976.

== Education and career ==
Stephenson earned a Bachelor of Business Administration degree at Texas Tech University in 1969, before moving to Wharton, Texas, in 1974. Since then he opened up his own accounting firm in Wharton, Stephenson, LeGrand & Pfeil, PLLC.

== Personal life ==
Phil and his first wife, Barbara, have two children. They married on October 6, 1973, and a year later they both moved to their new hometown of Wharton. Barbara died on September 25, 2016.

Texas House of Representatives
| Preceded by Jim Landtroop | Member of the Texas House of Representatives from the 85th district 2013–present | Incumbent |
