= Keith Henry =

British businessman (born 1945)

Keith Nicholas Henry FREng (born 3 March 1945) is a British businessman, and a former Chief Executive of National Power.

== Early life ==
He was born in Iran. He attended the independent Bedford School. He gained a BSc degree in Civil Engineering in 1967. He gained an MSc in Foundation from the University of Birmingham in 1969.

== Career ==
=== National Power ===
In 1995 he became Chief Executive of National Power. In 1996 he was given £628,000 in remuneration. National Power was headquartered in Swindon, and is essentially now known as RWE npower, being bought by RWE in 2000. In 1998 he received £859,000 in remuneration.

In 1997, National Power had 24% market share of the UK electricity market, employed 4,300 people, and generated 17GW in the UK and 7.5GW overseas. It operated 17 UK power plants. On 25 November 1998, National Power bought the supply business of Midlands Electricity (MEB), with 2.2m customers, for £180m.

On 27 April 1999 he was sacked as Chief Executive of National Power. Later that year in November 1999, it was announced that National Power would divided into two companies.

== Personal life ==
He married Susan Horsburgh in 1974 in the Chiltern and Beaconsfield region of Buckinghamshire. They have two daughters. He lives in north Surrey on St George's Hill.

Business positions
Preceded by	Chief Executive of National Power; 1995 - April 1999	Succeeded by Peter Giller (International Power, from February 2000)
