= Ben Leman =

Texas politician

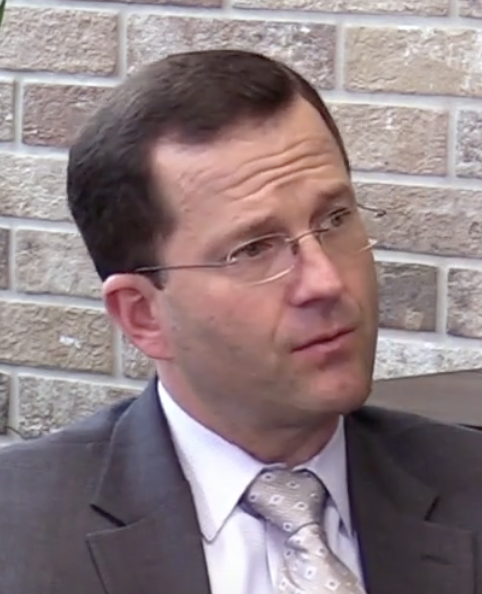
- Leman in 2019

Member of the Texas House of Representatives from the 13th district
- In office May 31, 2018 – January 10, 2023
- Preceded by: Leighton Schubert
- Succeeded by: Angelia Orr

Personal details
- Born: Benjamin Henry Leman; January 31, 1976 (age 50) Magnolia, Texas, U.S.
- Party: Republican
- Spouse: Christie Leman (m. 2004)
- Children: 4
- Education: University of Texas at Austin (BBA)
- Profession: Businessman
- Website: Official website

Benjamin Henry Leman (born January 31, 1976) is a former Republican member of the Texas House of Representatives for the 13th district.

== Political positions ==
Leman considers himself a conservative Republican. He opposes abortion, gun control legislation, regulation on business, and illegal immigration.

== Personal life ==
Leman was born in Magnolia, Texas. He's a 4th generation Texan. He graduated from the University of Texas at Austin with a BBA in finance. He married his wife Christie in 2004 and they have four children. Leman and his family have lived in Grimes County for 13 years. He and his family run a cow/calf operation, his children show animals at county fairs, they are active in the 4H-Club, and participate in youth sports. The Lemans are members of St. Stanislaus Catholic Church in Anderson.

== Career ==
Leman is the co-founder of Merrimac Manufacturing, Inc. an oil and gas equipment manufacturing company. As CEO of the company grew to over 100 employees and 25 stocking locations around the world. Leman sold the company in 2012 to a publicly traded company.

== Political career ==
Ben Leman (R) won in the general election against Cecil R. Webster (D) 79.1% to 20.9%. He is a former judge for Grimes County. He announced in September 2021 that he will not be running for re-election.

Texas House of Representatives
Preceded by Leighton Schubert	Member of the Texas House of Representatives from the 13th district 2018–2023	Succeeded by Angelia Orr
