= Ban on sharia law =

A ban on sharia law is legislation that prohibits the application or implementation of Islamic law (Sharia) in courts in any civil (non-religious) jurisdiction. In the United States for example, various states have "banned Sharia law", or a ballot measure was passed that "prohibits the state's courts from considering foreign, international or religious law." As of 2026, these include Alabama, Arizona, Florida, Kansas, Louisiana, North Carolina, South Dakota, Texas, and Tennessee. In the Canadian province of Ontario, family law disputes are arbitrated only under Ontario law.

== United States ==
=== Constitutional prohibitions and accommodations ===
Because of the Establishment Clause of the United States Constitution, no religious tradition can be established as the basis of laws that apply to everyone, including any form of sharia, Christian canon law, Jewish halakha, or rules of dharma from Hinduism and Buddhism. Laws must be passed in a secular fashion, not by religious authorities. The Free Exercise Clause allows residents to practice any religion or no religion, and there is often controversy about separation of church and state and the balance between these two clauses when the government does or does not accommodate any particular religious practice (for example blue laws that require stores to be closed on Sunday, the Christian holy day).

Direct consultation of any religious law, including any form of sharia, is relatively rare in U.S. jurisprudence and is generally limited to circumstances where the government is accommodating the religious belief of a specific person. This occurs mainly in matters of arbitration and family law. For example, the law may allow parties to submit a dispute for binding arbitration to a mutually agreed-upon religious authority; mandatory arbitration by a specified or mutually-agreed arbitrator is also a common clause in commercial and labor union contracts. Couples with the same religious beliefs may wish to construct marriage contracts and conduct divorces in concordance with those beliefs, and people may also wish to arrange wills and other financial matters in accordance with their own religious principles. If presented as evidence, devotion to peaceful religious principles, along with many other aspects of personality, is commonly considered when judging the character of a person before the law, for example during sentencing or a parole hearing.

Despite the Free Exercise Clause, the 1878 Supreme Court decision in Reynolds v. United States (which concerned the conflict of the Mormon practice of polygamy with anti-bigamy laws) affirmed that secular laws still apply when they contradict religious practices, unless a superseding law establishes a right to a religious accommodation.

The American Bar Association has opposed legislation banning foreign law or sharia as unnecessary, on the grounds that existing safeguards against foreign law already protect against rules that are contrary to American foreign policy, including discrimination on the basis of gender and religion.

=== Background of controversy ===
In June 2009, a family court judge in Hudson County, New Jersey denied a restraining order to a woman who testified that her husband, a Muslim, had raped her. The judge said he did not believe the man "had a criminal desire to or intent to sexually assault" his wife because he was acting in a way that was "consistent with his practices." A state appeals court reversed his decision. Advocates of the ban in the U.S. have cited this case as an example of the need for the ban.

As of 2014, more than two dozen U.S. states have considered measures intended to restrict judges from consulting sharia law. Arizona, Kansas, Louisiana, South Dakota, Tennessee, North Carolina, and Alabama have "banned sharia", i.e., passed foreign law bans. In 2010 and 2011, more than two dozen states "considered measures to restrict judges from consulting Shariah, or foreign and religious laws more generally". As of 2013, all but 16 states have considered such a law.

In November 2010, voters in Oklahoma approved a ballot measure to amend the state constitution to ban sharia from state courts. The law was then updated to include all foreign or religious laws. The law was challenged by an official of the Council on American-Islamic Relations. In November 2010 a federal judge ruled the law to be unconstitutional and blocked the state from putting it into effect. The court found the ban had the potential to do harm to Muslims. The invalidation of a will and testament using sharia instructions was an example. That ruling and injunction were upheld by the Tenth Circuit Court of Appeals on January 10, 2012.

Missouri also passed a measure banning foreign law in 2013, but Governor Jay Nixon vetoed the bill "because of its potential impact on international adoptions."

Two other states banning sharia were North Carolina, which prohibited state judges from considering Islamic law in family cases in 2013, and Alabama, where voters passed an Amendment to the State Constitution (72% to 28%) to "ban sharia" in 2014.

=== Supporters ===
David Yerushalmi has been called the founder of the movement in America and is described by The New York Times as "working with a cadre of conservative public-policy institutes and former military and intelligence officials" and to pass legislation, "a network of Tea Party and Christian groups" as well as ACT! for America. This has been linked to the counter-jihad movement's efforts, along with legal campaigns to oppose mosque constructions across the US. According to him, the purpose of the anti-sharia movement is not to pass legislation banning sharia law in the courts but "to get people asking this question, 'What is Shariah?'".

In 2011, Republicans Sarah Palin, Newt Gingrich and Michele Bachmann warned about what they saw as the threat of sharia law. During the lead-up to Newt Gingrich's presidential campaign 2012, he described sharia law as a "mortal threat" and called for its ban throughout America. Sarah Palin has been quoted as saying that if shariah law "were to be adopted, allowed to govern in our country, it will be the downfall of America."

At a 2017 press conference in the U.S. Capitol, some Republican members of the United States Congress endorsed a new memorandum, based on a Center for Security Policy (CSP) report, Shariah: The Threat To America.

=== Analysis ===
A 2013 report by the Brennan Center for Justice warned that the bans may have the unintended effects of invalidating prenuptial agreements and court decisions made in other states where arbitrators may have taken into account Islamic, Jewish, or Christian legal norms. Randy Brinson, the president of the Christian Coalition of Alabama, criticized the ban in Alabama, calling it "redundant and a waste of time".

Historian Justin Tyler Clark argues that the rise of an anti-Sharia movement in the US, more than a decade after the September 11 attacks, is in part a reaction to increasing political correctness in the American society. Clark compares the phenomenon to the 19th century anti-Catholic movement in the US, which, he writes, rose largely in reaction to changes in middle-class American etiquette, interpreted by the nativists as encroachment of an alien ideology on their own social norms.

According to Sadakat Kadri, the ban on sharia laws notwithstanding, "the precepts of Islamic law ... have judicial force in the United States already", among Muslims who have had a dispute settled by Muslim conciliators. The 1925 Federal Arbitration Act allows Muslims, Christians, Jews, etc. to use religious tribunals to arbitrate disagreements and "the judgments that result are given force of law by state and federal courts". The statute "preempts inconsistent state legislation", such as laws to ban sharia.

For American Jews who choose to obey its rulings, a Beth Din (Rabbinical court) "may not merely decide the legal rights of devout Jews; in some cases, it may formally forbid believers from pursuing complaints through the secular judicial system without prior authorization from a rabbi. And Muslims can also have their inheritance, business, and matrimonial disputes sorted out by Islamic scholars, who attempt to decide them according to the sharia." While the US Congress could in theory repeal the act, it could not ban arbitration by Muslims while leaving other religious conciliators free to continue their work. "Any reform would have to impact equally on all faith communities, and it is not only Muslims who would object if federal legislators presumed to do that."

== Canada ==
In 2003–2004, there was a controversy in Ontario over the possibility of Islamic arbitration tribunals. In 1991, Ontario had passed the Arbitration Act, which allowed for legal mediation and arbitration outside of Canadian family law. Some Christian and Jewish groups conducted religious arbitration in accordance with this law; this did not cause controversy. In 2003, an Islamic group declared its intention to set up similar faith-based arbitration, provoking intense media controversy. As a result, the Ontario government commissioned Marion Boyd (the former Attorney General of Ontario) to review the matter. Boyd conducted consultations and concluded that religious tribunals be continued, but should be overseen by other institutions. Public opinion was against both Boyd's report and potential Islamic tribunals. As a result, in 2006, the province of Ontario banned all forms of faith-based arbitrations. As this decision also banned Rabbinical courts, it was criticized by Canadian Jewish groups.

In 2005, the National Assembly of Quebec passed a motion to prevent the use of Islamic courts in Quebec.

== Western Europe ==
=== United Kingdom ===
In the United Kingdom, Sharia has also become a political issue. A "One law for all" campaign seeks to ban sharia councils and arguing this is "the only way to end discrimination suffered by Muslim women".

The issue arose in 2008, when the former Archbishop of Canterbury Rowan Williams suggested it was "inevitable" that elements of Sharia would be incorporated in British law. Since then, "Sharia courts" have "never been far from tabloid headlines", according to Myriam Francois-Cerrah. As of 2014, there were reported to be around 85 "shariah courts" in the UK, operated by two rival services – Islamic Sharia Council and the newer, smaller, less strict Muslim Arbitration Tribunal. The councils/tribunals provide arbitration that is voluntary but legally binding, are "officially mandated" and set up outside the court system like another non-secular arbitration institution, the longstanding rabbinical tribunals.

The council/tribunals are defended as providing an essential service for pious Muslims who would simply work with non-government mandated Sharia councils if the government abolished the mandated ones. But they are also criticized for taking the man's side in rulings, for example advising women to forfeit their mahr (marriage dower) in exchange for a divorce. According to legal historian Sadakat Kadri, the Muslim Arbitration Tribunal has "no jurisdiction over criminal matters or cases involving children." A UK-trained lawyer sits "on all its panels, and every decision" is subject to judicial review – "meaning that it was subject to reversal if it disclosed unfair procedures, human rights violations, or any other step that ordinary court considered contrary to the public interest." According to Kadri, British Muslims neither know nor care about the criminal penalties of Sharia law (tazir and hudud) but seek much less controversial services.

A woman whose husband has abandoned her without speaking the words of release required by the Quran might approach a mufti in search of an annulment. Senior figures in a community will pay visits to the homes of disruptive teenagers to remind them of their religious roots. Muslims who are prudent as well as pious might ask scholars to tell them which mortgage and insurance products are consistent with Islamic jurisprudence.

In addition to the sharia law of the councils and tribunals, there have also been reports of "vigilante sharia squads" in some places, such as Whitechapel, East London. The legal system of the United Kingdom treats these squads as unlawful.

=== Germany ===
Sharia law is not recognized as a valid juridical system in Germany. Still, it takes its place in Germany's private law through the regulations of the German international private law. Its application is limited by the ordre public.

In September 2014, a small group of Muslims wearing mock police uniforms patrolled the streets of the western German city of Wuppertal. They "reportedly hovered around sites like discotheques and gambling houses, telling passers-by to refrain from gambling and alcohol". Following the incident the Interior Minister Thomas de Maizière told the daily newspaper Bild, "Sharia law is not tolerated on German soil." The leader of the "police", Salafist Sven Lau, responded by saying the "sharia police" "never existed" and he only wanted to "raise attention" to sharia. The Central Council of Muslims in Germany (ZMD) condemned the activities.

=== Greece ===
The issue of the supremacy of Sharia has arisen in Greece where a Muslim woman (Chatitze Molla Sali) was left her husband's estate in his will (a Greek document registered at a notary's office) when he died in March 2008. Her in-laws immediately challenged the bequest with the local mufti (a Muslim jurist and theologian) in the name of Sharia law, "which forbids Muslims to write wills" (Islamic law rather than the inheritee determining who gets what from the estate of the deceased). Molla Sali took the dispute to a civil court where she won, but in October 2013, the Greek Supreme Court ruled against her and "established that matters of inheritance among the Muslim minority must be resolved by the mufti, following Islamic laws", in accordance with the 1923 Treaty of Lausanne between Greece and Turkey. Sali has appealed the decision to the European Court of Human Rights, which ruled in her favor and ordered the Greek government to pay her 50,000 euros in damages plus her expenses.

== Muslim-majority countries ==
Although Turkey is a Muslim-majority country, since Kemal Atatürk's reforms and the creation of the Republic of Turkey, Sharia law was banned in 1924 and new westernized civil and penal codes were adopted in 1926.

In Malaysia, more than a dozen Islamic sharia laws attempted to be enacted by the Pan-Malaysian Islamic Party (PAS) in the state of Kelantan were repelled by Malaysia's federal top court, with the laws declared unconstitutional in a landmark decision in 2024 that could also affect similar Islamist attempts at enacting sharia laws in other states of the Muslim-majority country.

In Tunisia, some forms of Sharia law were reinterpreted.

== See also ==
- Application of Sharia by country
