= Application of Sharia by country =

Application of such Law

Sharia means Islamic law based on Islamic concepts based from Quran and Hadith. Since the early Islamic states of the eighth and ninth centuries, Sharia always existed alongside other normative systems.

Historically, Sharia was interpreted by independent jurists (Faqihs), based on Islamic scriptural sources and various legal methodologies. In the modern era, statutes inspired by European codes replaced traditional laws in most parts of the Muslim world, with classical Sharia rules retained mainly in personal status laws. Countries such as Pakistan and Saudi Arabia have Islam as their state religion, but haven’t implemented Sharia law fully. These laws were codified by legislative bodies which sought to modernize them without abandoning their foundations in traditional jurisprudence. The Islamic revival of the late 20th century brought along calls by Islamist movements for full implementation of Sharia, including hudud capital punishments, which in some cases resulted in traditionalist legal reform. Some countries with Muslim minorities use Sharia-based laws to regulate banking, economics, inheritance, marriage and other governmental and personal affairs of their Muslim population. The use of Sharia in non-Muslim countries and on non-Muslims is debated.

== Historical background ==
Sharia is a religious law forming part of the Islamic tradition. Traditional theory of Islamic jurisprudence recognizes four sources of Sharia: the Quran, sunnah (authentic hadith), qiyas (analogical reasoning), and ijma (juridical consensus). Different legal schools—of which the most prominent are Hanafi, Maliki, Shafi'i, Hanbali and Jafari (Shia)—developed methodologies for deriving Sharia rulings from scriptural sources. Traditional jurisprudence (fiqh) distinguishes two principal branches of law, ʿibādāt (rituals) and muʿāmalāt (social relations), which together comprise a wide range of topics. Thus, some areas of Sharia overlap with the Western notion of law while others correspond more broadly to living life in accordance with God's will.

Classical jurisprudence was elaborated by private religious scholars, largely through legal opinions (fatwas) issued by qualified jurists (muftis). It was historically applied in Sharia courts by ruler-appointed judges, who dealt mainly with civil disputes and community affairs. Sultanic courts, the police and market inspectors administered criminal justice, which was influenced by Sharia but not bound by its rules. Non-Muslim (dhimmi) communities had legal autonomy to adjudicate their internal affairs. Over the centuries, Sunni muftis were gradually incorporated into state bureaucracies, and fiqh was complemented by various economic, criminal and administrative laws issued by Muslim rulers. The Ottoman civil code of 1869–1876 was the first partial attempt to codify Sharia.

In the modern era, traditional laws in the Muslim world have been widely replaced by statutes inspired by European models. Judicial procedures and legal education were likewise brought in line with European practice. While the constitutions of most Muslim-majority states contain references to Sharia, its classical rules were largely retained only in personal status law. Legislators who codified these laws sought to modernize them without abandoning their foundations in traditional jurisprudence. The Islamic revival of the late 20th century brought along calls by Islamist movements for full implementation of Sharia, including hudud capital punishments and other forms of punishment like qisas and diyah In some cases, this resulted in traditionalist legal reform, while other countries witnessed juridical reinterpretation of Sharia advocated by progressive reformers. While hudud punishments hold symbolic importance for their proponents and have attracted international attention, in countries where they make part of the legal system, they have been used infrequently or not at all, and their application has varied depending on local political climate.

Some Muslim-minority countries recognize the use of Sharia-based family laws for their Muslim populations. The adoption and demand for Sharia in the legal system of nations with significant Muslim-minorities is an active topic of international debate. Reintroducing Sharia in Muslim-majority nations has been described as "a longstanding goal for Islamist movements", and attempts to introduce or expand Sharia have been accompanied by controversy, violence, and even warfare.

== Types of legal systems ==
The legal systems of Muslim countries may be grouped as: secular systems, mixed systems, and classical Sharia systems.

=== Secular systems ===
Secular systems are those where Sharia plays no role in the nation's legal system and religious interference in state affairs, politics, and law is not permitted. Turkey has been an example of a Muslim-majority nation with a secular system. Several states in West Africa and Central Asia also describe themselves as secular.

=== Mixed systems ===
Most Muslim countries have mixed legal systems that postulate a constitution and rule of law, while also allowing rules of traditional Islamic jurisprudence to influence certain areas of national law. These systems possess large bodies of codified laws, which may be based on European or Indian codes. In these systems, the central legislative role is played by politicians and modern jurists rather than traditional religious scholars. Pakistan, Egypt, Malaysia, and Nigeria are examples of states having mixed systems. Some states with Muslim minorities, such as Greece (Western Thrace region only) and Israel, also have mixed systems that administer Sharia for their Muslim population.

=== Classical Sharia systems ===
Under this system, shared by a small minority of modern countries, classical Sharia is formally equated with national law and to a great extent provides its substance. The state has a ruler who functions as the highest judiciary and may promulgate and modify laws in some legal domains, but traditional religious scholars (ulama) play a decisive role in interpreting Sharia. The classical Sharia system is exemplified by Saudi Arabia and some Gulf states. Iran shares many of the same features, but also possesses characteristics of mixed legal systems, such as a parliament and codified laws.

== Domains of application ==
=== Constitutional law ===
Most Muslim-majority countries incorporate Sharia at some level in their legal framework. Their constitutions commonly refer to Sharia as a source or the main source of law, though these references are not in themselves indicative of how much the legal system is influenced by Sharia, and whether the influence has a traditionalist or modernist character. The same constitutions usually also refer to universal principles such as democracy and human rights, leaving it up to legislators and the judiciary to work out how these norms are to be reconciled in practice. Conversely, some countries (e.g., Algeria), whose constitution does not mention Sharia, possess Sharia-based family laws. Nisrine Abiad identifies Bahrain, Iran, Pakistan, and Saudi Arabia as states with "strong constitutional consequences" of Sharia "on the organization and functioning of power".

=== Family law ===
Except for secular systems, Muslim-majority countries possess Sharia-based family laws (marriage, inheritance, etc.). These laws generally reflect influence of various modern-era reforms and tend to be characterized by ambiguity, with traditional and modernist interpretations often manifesting themselves in the same country, both in legislation and court decisions. In Greece (only in Western Thrace), Indonesia (outside of Aceh, and in most circumstances), Nigeria (outside the states using Sharia law) and Senegal (only in inheritance) people can choose whether to pursue a case in a Sharia or secular court.

=== Criminal law ===
Countries in the Muslim world generally have criminal codes influenced by French law or common law, and in some cases a combination of Western legal traditions. In the course of Islamization campaigns, several countries (Libya, Pakistan, Iran, Sudan, Mauritania, and Yemen) inserted Islamic criminal laws into their penal codes, which were otherwise based on Western models. In some countries only hudud penalties were added, while others also enacted provisions for qisas (law of retaliation) and diya (monetary compensation). Iran subsequently issued a new "Islamic Penal Code". Saudi Arabia has never adopted a criminal code and Saudi judges still follow traditional Hanbali jurisprudence. The criminal code of Afghanistan contain a general provision that certain crimes are to be punished according to Sharia, without specifying the penalties. In United Arab Emirates, Sharia in criminal law is only applicable in determining diyah amounts. Some Nigerian states have also enacted Islamic criminal laws. Laws in the Indonesian province of Aceh provide for application of discretionary (ta'zir) punishments for violation of Islamic norms, but explicitly exclude hudud and qisas. Brunei has been implementing a "Sharia Penal Code", which includes provisions for stoning and amputation, in stages since 2014. The countries where hudud penalties are legal do not use stoning and amputation routinely, and generally apply other punishments instead.

=== Map ===
Countries where Sharia plays no official role in the judicial system Countries where Sharia exists only for Muslims (not for non-Muslims) and plays a role only in adjudicating personal status issues (such as marriage, divorce, inheritance, and child custody) Countries where Sharia plays a role in adjudicating personal status issues as well as criminal cases Countries with regional variations in the application of Sharia

== Africa ==
=== Algeria ===
Article 222 of the Family Code of 1983 specifies Sharia as the residuary source of laws. According to the U.S. State Department, the Sharia-derived family code treats women as minors under the legal guardianship of a husband or male relative, though in practice the implied restrictions are not uniformly enforced.

=== Benin ===
It has a civil law system with influences from customary law.

=== Burkina Faso ===
It has a civil law system.

=== Cameroon ===
It has a mixed legal system of English common law, French civil law, and customary law.

=== Chad ===
After gaining independence from France, Chad retained the French legal system.

=== Comoros ===
The legal system is based on both Sharia and remnants of the French legal code. According to the article 229-7 of the Penal Code, any Muslim who makes use of products forbidden by Sharia can be punished by imprisonment of up to six months.

=== Côte d'Ivoire ===
It has a civil law system.

=== Djibouti ===
The Family Code is mainly derived from Sharia and regulates personal status matters such as marriage, divorce, child custody and inheritance. Sharia does not apply to criminal law.

=== Egypt ===
Article 2 of Egypt's 2014 Constitution declares the principles of Sharia to be the main source of legislation. Egypt's law and enforcement system are in flux since its 2011 revolution; however, the declaration of Sharia's primacy in Article 2 is a potential ground for unconstitutionality of any secular laws in Egyptian legal code. Sharia courts and judges are run and licensed by the Ministry of Justice. The personal status law that regulates matters such as marriage, divorce and child custody is governed by Sharia. In a family court, a woman's testimony is worth half of a man's testimony.

=== Eritrea ===
Muslims are required to use Sharia courts for cases dealing with marriage, inheritance and family of Muslims.

=== Ethiopia ===
Muslims can choose Sharia law only if all parties consent for cases regarding marriage, divorce, maintenance, guardianship of minors (only if both parties are Muslims). Also included are cases concerning waqfs, gifts, succession, or wills, provided that donor is a Muslim or deceased was a Muslim at time of death. The consensual model was established because of the Kedija Bashir et al. case, where the House of Federation firmly established that sharia law can only hear cases if all parties consent therefore replacing the previously exclusive powers of sharia personal law.

=== Gabon ===
It has a mixed legal system of French civil law and customary law.

=== The Gambia ===
Article 7 of the constitution identifies Sharia as source of law in matters of personal status and inheritance among members of communities to which it applies.

=== Ghana ===
Ghana is a secular state. Any other laws inconsistent with the national constitution are deemed null and void. No religious laws are applied in civil or criminal cases.

=== Guinea-Bissau ===
It has a mixed legal system of civil law and customary law.

=== Guinea ===
It has a civil law system.

=== Kenya ===
Sharia is applied by Kadhis courts where "all the parties profess the Muslim religion". Under article 170, section 5 of the constitution, the jurisdiction of Kadhis' court is limited to matters relating to "personal status, marriage, divorce or inheritance in proceedings in which all the parties profess the Muslim religion, and Muslims are then required to use the jurisdiction of the Kadhi’s courts".

=== Libya ===
Muammar Gaddafi merged civil and Sharia courts in 1973. Civil courts now employ Sharia judges who sit in regular courts of appeal and specialise in Sharia appellate cases. The personal status laws are derived from Sharia.

=== Mali ===
It has a civil law system influenced by customary law. In urban areas, positive law is common. In rural areas the customary law usually dominates. Local rural versions of Sharia are the predominant sources for customary law. Article 25 in Title II of Mali's constitution declares it to be a secular state.

=== Mauritania ===
The Penal Code contains Sharia crimes such as heresy, apostasy, atheism, refusal to pray, adultery and alcohol consumption. Punishments include stoning, amputation and lashing.

=== Morocco ===
In 1956, a Code of Personal Status (Mudawana) was issued, based on dominant Maliki school of Sharia jurisprudence. Regional Sharia courts also hear personal status cases on appeal. In matters of family law, a woman's testimony is worth only half of that of a man. With 2003 reforms of its criminal law, Article 222 of its new criminal code is derived from Sharia; Articles 220–221, 268–272 of its criminal law similarly codify those activities as crimes that are prohibited under Sharia. Morocco adopted a new constitution in 2011; Article 41 of this constitution granted sole power to the Superior Council of the Ulemas to guide its laws through fatwas.

=== Mozambique ===
Paula Rainha states that, "Mozambique’s legal system can be considered civil law based (at least the formal legal system) and legislation is the primary source of law."

=== Niger ===
It has not adopted any elements of Sharia.

=== Nigeria ===
Use of Sharia in Nigeria: Sharia plays no role in the judicial system. Sharia applies in personal status issues only. Sharia applies to personal status issues and criminal law.

Sharia states: Until 1999, Sharia applied primarily to civil matters, but twelve of Nigeria's thirty-six states have since extended Sharia to criminal matters. Sharia courts can order amputations, and a few have been carried out. The twelve Sharia states are Zamfara, Bauchi, Borno, Gombe, Jigawa, Kaduna, Kano, Katsina, Kebbi, Niger, Sokoto and Yobe.

Borno, Gombe and Yobe have not yet begun to apply their Sharia Penal Codes.

The rest of Nigeria has a mixed legal system of English common law and traditional law.

=== Senegal ===
The legal system of Senegal is based on French civil law. The 1972 Family Code (Code de la famille) is secular in nature. Sharia is allowed by article 571 of the Family Code only in the case of intestate successions, and only if the person had demonstrated in life a wish that his succession would be regulated by Sharia. Most succession cases are decided under this provision. There has been growing political attempts to introduce more Sharia regulations.

=== Sierra Leone ===
It has a common law system influenced by customary law.

=== Somalia ===
Sharia was adopted in 2009. Article 2 of Somali 2012 Constitution states no law can be enacted that is not compliant with the general principles and objectives of Sharia. Sharia currently influences all aspects of Xeer as well as Somalia's formal legal system.

=== Sudan ===
Sharia has been previously declared the chief source of all legislation in Sudan's 1968, 1973 and 1998 Constitutions. In 2005, Sudan adopted an interim national constitution; it removed some references to Sharia, but included Sharia-derived criminal, civil and personal legal codes, as well as Sharia-mandated hudud punishments. The Criminal Act of 1991 prescribes punishments which include forty lashes for drinking alcohol, amputation of the right hand for theft of a certain value and stoning for adultery. However, there is no record of either any amputation or stoning ever having taken place in Sudan.

The use of Sharia in Sudan ended in September 2020, when Sudan officially became a secular state after Sudan's transitional government agreed to separate religion from the state, ending 30 years of Islamic rule and Islam as the official state religion in the North African nation. It also scrapped the apostasy law and public flogging.

However, after 1 year of military coup took place, Sharia got installed once again and harsh punishment like floggings still exist according to article 146.

=== Tanzania ===
Sharia is applicable to Muslims under the Judicature and Applications of Laws Act, empowering courts to apply Sharia to matters of succession in communities that generally follow Sharia in matters of personal status and inheritance. Unlike mainland Tanzania, Zanzibar retains Islamic courts.

=== Togo ===
It has a customary law system.

=== Tunisia ===
Tunisia has a long secular tradition with a legal system that was enacted after French colonialism. The Law of Personal Status bans polygamy and extrajudicial divorce. Sharia courts were abolished in 1956. Secular inheritance laws are indirectly based on Islamic jurisprudence, with religion never being mentioned in the Code of Personal Status.

=== Uganda ===
Article 129 (1) (d) of the constitution allows the parliament to establish by law "Qadhi’s courts for marriage, divorce, inheritance of property and guardianship".

== Americas ==
=== Canada ===
Sharia is explicitly banned in Quebec, Canada, upheld by a unanimous vote against it in 2005 by the National Assembly of Quebec, while the province of Ontario allows family law disputes to be arbitrated only under Ontario law.

=== United States ===
In the United States, various states have outlawed Sharia, or passed some form of ballot measure that prohibits state courts from considering foreign, international or religious law in their decisions. As of 2014, these include Alabama, Arizona, Kansas, Louisiana, North Carolina, South Dakota, and Tennessee. In 2025, Sharia in Texas became a controversial topic, causing organizations such as the Council of American-Islamic Relations and East Plano Islamic Center to become targets for "anti-Sharia" lawmakers.

== Asia ==
=== Afghanistan ===
Under the rule of the Taliban in Afghanistan, Sharia law is the sole legal framework governing both criminal and civil matters. The legal system is based entirely on the principles of Islamic law, primarily following the Hanafi school of jurisprudence. All offenses are adjudicated in accordance with Sharia, with the application of hudud (fixed punishments), qisas (retributive justice), and tazir (discretionary punishment).

In 2024, following Taliban recapture of power in 2021, they issued the Law on the Promotion of Virtue and the Prevention of Vice, comprising 35 articles, which included prohibiting the publication or taking of images of living beings in the media as a violation of Sharia law.

=== Bahrain ===
Article 2 of Bahrain's 2002 Constitution as originally adopted, as well as after February 2012 amendment, declares Islamic Sharia is a chief source of legislation. Four tiers of ordinary courts have jurisdiction over cases related to civil, administrative and criminal matters, with Court of Cassation the highest civil court in Bahrain; in all matters, the judges are required to resort to Sharia in case legislation is silent or unclear. Sharia courts handle personal status laws.

A personal status law was codified in 2009 to regulate personal status matters. It applies only to Sunni Muslims; there is no codified personal status law for Shiites. In a Sharia court a Muslim woman's testimony is worth half of that of a Muslim man.

=== Bangladesh ===
Bangladesh has a secular constitution but marriage, divorce, alimony and property inheritance are regulated by Sharia for Muslims. The Constitution also declared Islam as its state religion. The Muslim Personal Law (Shariat) Application Act, 1937 (XXVI of 1937) applies to Muslims in all matters relating to family affairs. Islamic family law is applied through the regular court system. There are no limitations on interfaith marriages.

=== Brunei ===
Sharia courts decide personal status cases or cases relating to religious offences. Sultan Hassanal Bolkiah declared in 2011 his wish to establish Islamic criminal law as soon as possible. A new penal code enacted in May 2014 prescribes Sharia punishments, including the severing of limbs for property crimes and death by stoning for adultery and homosexuality.

=== India ===
India has a secular constitution but marriage, divorce, alimony and property inheritance are regulated by Sharia for Muslims. These laws are not applicable in the states of Goa and Uttarakhand. Additionally, these laws are not applicable to Indians who married under the Special Marriage Act, 1954.

=== Indonesia ===
Aceh is the only part of Indonesia to apply Sharia to criminal law. Islamic courts in Aceh had long handled cases of marriage, divorce and inheritance. After special autonomy legislation was passed in 2001, the reach of courts extend to criminal justice. Offences such as being alone with an unrelated member of the opposite gender and gambling can be punished with canings. In 2014, the provincial government of Aceh extended Sharia's reach to non-Muslims whose offenses also involve a Muslim, which they can choose to be punished voluntarily either by national law or regional-based Islamic law. If a non-Muslim commits an offense not covered by the Indonesian national criminal code, the non-Muslim may choose to be punished by their own customary or religious law or under Aceh provincial Sharia Law. However, since 2022, this practice is de facto removed and caning in Aceh applies for Indonesian Muslims only.

In other parts of Indonesia, religious courts have jurisdiction over civil cases between Muslim spouses on matters concerning marriage, divorce, reconciliation, and alimony. The competence of religious courts is not exclusive, and parties can apply to District Courts for adjudication on basis of Roman Dutch law or local adat. Suharto's New Order expanded the reach of Sharia, first with the 1974 Marriage Act, which assigned jurisdiction over the marriage and divorce of Muslims to the Islamic courts (Indonesian: peradilan agama), and with the 1989 Religious Judicature Act, which elevated Islamic courts by making them a parallel legal system, equal to state courts and gave them jurisdiction over inheritance (wasiyyah), gifts (hibah) and religious endowments. Muslim litigants could originally choose whether to have inheritance questions decided by the Islamic courts or by the civil courts, but a 2006 amendment eliminated this possibility; the same amendment gave Islamic courts new jurisdiction over property disputes, including financial and economic matters. Muslims seeking a divorce must also file their claim in Islamic courts. The Compilation of Islamic Law 1991 (Indonesian: Kompilasi Hukum Islam) regulates marriage, inheritance, and charitable trusts (wakaf). Sharia falls outside the jurisdiction of the Constitutional Court.

=== Iran ===
Article 167 of the constitution states that all judicial rulings must be based upon "authoritative Islamic sources and authentic fatwa" by the Twelver Ja'afari school of jurisprudence. Book 2 of the Islamic Penal Code of Iran is entirely devoted to hudud punishments. Iranian application of Sharia has been seen by scholars as highly flexible and directly contradicting traditional interpretations of the Sharia.

=== Iraq ===
Article 1 of the Civil Code identifies Sharia as a main source of legislation. The 1958 Code "made polygamy extremely difficult, granted child custody to the mother in case of divorce, [and] prohibited repudiation and marriage under the age of 16." In 1995, Iraq introduced Sharia punishment for certain types of criminal offenses.

Iraq's legal system is based on Islamic Sunni and Jafari (Shi’ite) interpretations of Sharia. Article 41 of the constitution allows for personal status matters (such as marriage, divorce and inheritance) to be governed by the rules of each religious group. The article has not yet been put into effect, and a unified personal status law remains in place that builds on the 1959 personal status code.

=== Israel ===
Sharia is one of the sources of legislation for Muslim citizens. Sharia is binding on personal law issues for Muslim citizens. The Sharia Courts of Israel arose as a continuation of the Ottoman Sharia courts, whose jurisdiction was restricted under the British Mandate. The Sharia Courts operate under the jurisdiction of the Ministry of Justice and adjudicate matters relating to marriages, divorce, financial maintenance, legal capacity and guardianship, custody of children, paternity, prevention of domestic violence, conversion to Islam, and inheritance, among others.

=== Jordan ===
Jordan has Sharia courts and civil courts. Sharia courts have jurisdiction over personal status laws, cases concerning Diya (blood money in cases of crime where both parties are Muslims, or one is and both the Muslim and non-Muslim consent to Sharia court's jurisdiction), and matters pertaining to Islamic Waqfs. The Family Law in force is the Personal Status Law of 1976, which is based on Sharia. In Sharia courts, the testimony of two women is equal to that of one man.

=== Kazakhstan ===
Sharia was in force up until early 1920. The 1995 constitution is not based on Sharia.

=== Kuwait ===
Article 2 of Kuwait's constitution identifies Islamic Sharia as one of the main sources of legislation. According to the United Nations, Kuwait's legal system is a combination of British common law, French civil law, Egyptian civil law and Sharia. The Sharia-based personal status law for Sunnis is based on the Maliki fiqh and for Shiites, their own school of Islam regulates personal status. Kuwait attempts to block some internet content prohibited by Sharia, such as pornography.

=== Kyrgyzstan ===
It has a civil law system.

=== Lebanon ===
Lebanon's legal system is based on a combination of Civil Law, Sharia and Ottoman laws. There are eighteen official religions in Lebanon, each with its own family law and religious courts. For the application of personal status laws, there are three separate sections: Sunni, Shia and non-Muslim. The Law of 16 July 1962 declares that Sharia governs personal status laws of Muslims, with Sunni and Ja'afari Shia jurisdiction of Sharia.

=== Malaysia ===
The Ninth Schedule of the Federal Constitution of Malaysia recognizes Sharia as a state subject; in other words, only the states of Malaysia have the power to enact and enforce Sharia. Hudud Islamic criminal law statutes have been passed at the state level in Terengganu, Kelantan and Perlis, but as of 2014, none of these laws have been implemented, as they contravene the Federal Constitution. The Malaysian Constitution also states that Islamic laws only apply to Muslims and Sharia courts have no jurisdiction over non-Muslims.

The maximum punishment allowable under Sharia criminal law in Malaysia was limited to only 6 strokes of the cane, a fine of RM 5,000, and 3 years in prison by the Syariah Court (Criminal Jurisdiction) Act 1965, also known as Act 355. Any Sharia criminal law which exceeds the limits imposed under Act 355 are deemed to be unconstitutional and cannot be enforced. However, there has been a proposal to increase these limits, but it remains a controversy among Malaysians.

In 2007, Malaysia's Federal Court in the Lina Joy case ruled that apostasy matter lay "within the exclusive jurisdiction of Sharia Courts". In some states, Malaysian Muslims can be sentenced to sharia-style caning for offences such as drinking beer, and adultery. Several Sharia crimes, such as khalwat (close proximity of unmarried man and woman) are punishable only in Sharia courts of Malaysia. Publishing an Islamic book that is different from official Malaysian version, without permission, is a crime in some states. Other Sharia-based criminal laws were enacted with "Syariah Criminal Offences (Federal Territory) Act of 1997".

Muslims are bound by Sharia on personal matters, while members of other faiths follow civil law. Muslims are required to follow Sharia in family, inheritance and religious matters. In 1988, the constitution was amended to state that civil courts cannot hear matters that fall within the jurisdiction of Sharia courts.

=== Maldives ===
Article 15 of the Act Number 1/81 (Penal Code) allows for hudud punishments. Article 156 of the constitution states that law includes the norms and provisions of Sharia.

=== Myanmar ===
In Myanmar, Sharia has been applied for personal status issues since colonial times, under section 13 of Burma Law Act, 1898. Court precedents also decided that Waqf matters are to be decided under Sharia. The 1952 Myanmar Muslim Dissolution of Marriage Act states that a Muslim woman has the right to divorce her husband with appropriate cause. Matters relating to Sharia family law are decided by civil courts.

=== Oman ===
Islamic Sharia is the basis for legislation in Oman per Article 2 of its Constitution, and promulgated as Sultani Decree 101/1996. The Personal Statute (Family) Law issued by Royal Decree 97/32 codified provisions of Sharia. Sharia Court Departments within the civil court system are responsible for personal status matters. A 2008 law stipulates that the testimonies of men and women before a court are equal.

Oman's criminal law is based on a combination of Sharia and English common law. Omani commercial law is largely based on Sharia; Article 5 of its Law of Commerce defaults to primacy of Sharia in cases of confusion, silence or conflict.

=== Pakistan ===
The Constitution of Pakistan acknowledges God as the sole sovereign of the universe and the Parliament as a delegate. The Constitution of Pakistan requires that all laws conform with Islam and not conflict with the Quran or Sunnah. The Council of Islamic Ideology reviewed the British era legislation and found most of it did not conflict with Sharia. Sharia was declared the Supreme Law of Pakistan in the 1991 Enforcement of Shariat Act. Section 4 stipulates that courts select an interpretation of law consistent with Islamic jurisprudence and principles.

The Federal Shariat Court was formed to judge the conformity of Pakistani laws with Islam according to the Quran and Sunnah. It has appellate, original and revisional jurisdiction. It consists of 8 judges including three ulama who are required to be qualified in Sharia. The Federal Shariat Court invalidated 55 federal statutes and 212 provincial statutes over 30 years. Originally certain legislative documents such as the Muslim Personal Law, the Constitution, fiscal and procedural laws were excluded from the original jurisdiction of the Federal Shariat Court. In its 1994 judgement the Supreme Court declared that the term "Muslim personal law" used in Article 203B, which excludes the Federal Shariat Court's jurisdiction under Article 203D only referred to the personal law of each Muslim sect according to their interpretation of the Quran and Sunnah. Hence, the Federal Shariat Court judgement in 2000 held that all other legislation which applied to Muslims in general were under the jurisdiction of the Federal Shariat Court under Article 203D. The court also held that the Constitution had not intended to reduce the role of the Federal Shariat Court.

Pakistani evidence law has been brought into conformity with Sharia. However, only 9 sections needed to be changed from the British era 1872 evidence act. The differences in the Islamic version focus more on rules concerning the number, character and competence of eyewitnesses. For example, in financial or future matters, the Law of Evidence says that evidence must be attested to by two men, or one man and two women. The Law of Evidence also requires a court to determine competence of a witness by reference to the Islamic injunctions in the Quran and Sunnah.

Qisas and Diyat laws prescribe retaliatory punishments or compensatory blood money for offenses such as murder and injury. The Qisas and Diyat laws in Pakistan make offences such as murder a private offence against the victim and their family, instead of classifying them as a public offence against the state as it had been during the British rule who had abandoned the Qisas and Diyat laws because they made enforcing law and order difficult since the victim or victim's family could pardon or take blood money as compensation. The Qisas and Diyat laws were first introduced by presidential ordinance in 1990 and were then enshrined in law in 1997.

Most offences in Pakistani law fall under tazir and siyasah. The Pakistan Penal Code is regarded as a code of tazir offences although it includes siyasah offences too even though the term siyasah is not mentioned. The Hudood Ordinance divides the crimes of zina, qazf, drinking and theft into two categories: those liable to hadd and those liable to tazir. Shariah leaves tazir punishments to discretion. If the strict evidentiary requirements for hadd offences are not fulfilled, the tazir (discretionary) punishments can be awarded to hadd offences too. Tazir punishments can include forms of punishments such as fines, imprisonment and whipping.

There are very strict conditions for imposing the hadd punishment of amputation on thieves. The principle used is that the accused will be spared from hadd punishment for any minor doubt and the court will use all legitimate means to avoid imposing a hadd punishment. For this reason, no amputation has ever been occurred for theft. Theft which is committed under pressure is not liable to hadd. Other factors taken into consideration are the relationship between a victim and the culprit as well as the value of the stolen property. However, Section 13 of the Ordinance states that theft which is not liable to hadd can be punished under tazir. The punishment under Pakistan Penal Code such as fines or imprisonment are applied to theft liable to tazir. Pakistani law also classifies robbery (harabah) as a hadd offence.

President Zia ul Haq introduced the Zakat system to Pakistan through the Zakat and Ushr Ordinance (1980). In Ramadan Pakistani banks deduct 2.5 percent from bank accounts above the Nisab amount. The banks send the collection to the Ministry of Finance. The Zakat and Ushr Ordinance specify which categories of people are eligible for receiving zakat. These include religious students, orphans and the sick. Pakistani ushr law levies 5 percent tax on harvests from artificially irrigated lands and 10 percent tax on lands which are not artificially irrigated.

Pakistan eliminated interest from domestic transactions but not from foreign debt. Profit and loss sharing schemes and contract markups were started. However, the ulama considered profit and loss to also be a form of riba. The Finance Minister Ghulam Ishaq Khan admitted this in 1984 and said that illegal profiteering and hoarding had to be eliminated. In 1991, the Federal Shariat Court declared riba to be haram and struck down 32 financial laws for being unIslamic. Two private banks challenged this ruling on the grounds that while they accepted the ruling, there was no alternative available. The federal law minister stated: "the government does not challenge the contention that interest is against the Quran, but the system is so deeply entrenched that it cannot be eliminated overnight."

Punishment for apostasy have been effectuated through Pakistan's blasphemy laws. In 2006 the government sent a bill to the parliamentary committee for consideration which would impose the death penalty on apostates. The bill has not been passed yet. The principle is that a lacuna in statute law is to be filled with Sharia. Martin Lau hypothesized that even though there was no statutory provision concerning apostasy, it may already be punishable by death in Pakistan because of this principle. In 2010, the Federal Shariat Court held that apostasy and treason are both hadd offences.

In 2010, the Court also invalidated those sections of the 2006 Women's Protection Act which had overrode the clauses of the zina and qazf Ordinances.

=== Philippines ===
Sharia district courts in Mindanao

There are Sharia trial and circuit trial courts in Mindanao, which is home to the country's significant Filipino Muslim minority. Sharia District Courts (SDCs) and Sharia Circuit Courts (SCCs) were created in 1977 through Presidential Decree 1083, which is also known as the Code of Muslim Personal Laws. In 2024, this was expanded to Visayas and Luzon. Sharia only applies to civil cases involving all Muslims nationwide.

Cases are handled in Bangsamoro and a couple of Mindanao provinces outside the autonomous region by both Sharia district and circuit courts, organised into five Sharia districts. Outside these areas, Sharia-related cases are processed in civil courts under a session from the five Sharia districts. All other cases, including criminal ones, are dealt with by local civil courts.

=== Qatar ===
Sharia is the main source of Qatari legislation according to Qatar's Constitution. Sharia is applied to laws pertaining to family law, inheritance, and several criminal acts (including adultery, robbery and murder). In some cases in Sharia-based family courts, a female's testimony is worth half a man's and in some cases a female witness is not accepted at all.

Flogging is used in Qatar as a punishment for alcohol consumption or illicit sexual relations. Article 88 of Qatar's criminal code declares the punishment for adultery is 100 lashes. Adultery is punishable by death when a Muslim woman and a non-Muslim man are involved. In 2006, a Filipino woman was sentenced to 100 lashes for adultery. In 2012, six expatriates were sentenced to floggings of either 40 or 100 lashes. More recently in April 2013, a Muslim expatriate was sentenced to 40 lashes for alcohol consumption. In June 2014, a Muslim expatriate was sentenced to 40 lashes for consuming alcohol and driving under the influence.

Judicial corporal punishment is common in Qatar due to the Hanbali interpretation of Sharia. Article 1 of the Law No. 11 of 2004 (Penal Code) allows for the application of "Sharia provisions" for the crimes of theft, adultery, defamation, drinking alcohol and apostasy if either the suspect or the victim is a Muslim.

=== Saudi Arabia ===
Until 2021, Saudi law was based entirely on Sharia. No codified personal status law existed, which meant that judges in courts ruled based on their own interpretations of Sharia. See Legal system of Saudi Arabia. Following the disappearance and assassination of Jamal Khashoggi in 2018, the Saudi regime was subject to accusations of corruption and misrepresentation of Islam. As of 2021, Saudi Arabia has implemented codified personal status laws, including the Personal Status Law, the Civil Transactions Law, the Penal Code for Discretionary Sanctions, and the Law of Evidence implemented by reformist crown prince Mohammed Bin Salman.

=== Singapore ===
Sharia courts may hear and determine actions in which all parties are Muslims or in which parties involved were married under Muslim law. Court has jurisdiction over cases related to marriage, divorce, betrothal, nullity of marriage, judicial separation, division of property on divorce, payment of dowry, maintenance, and Mut'ah.

=== Sri Lanka ===
Private matters of Muslims are governed by Muslim Law, including marriage, divorce custody and maintenance. Muslim law principles have been codified in the Act No. 13 of 1951 Marriage and Divorce (Muslim) Act; Act No. 10 of 1931 Muslim Intestate Succession Ordinance and Act No. 51 of 1956 Muslim Mosques and Charitable Trusts or Wakfs Act.

=== Syria ===
Article 3 of the 1973 Syrian constitution declares Islamic jurisprudence one of Syria's main sources of legislation. The Personal Status Law 59 of 1953 (amended by Law 34 of 1975) is essentially a codified Sharia. The Code of Personal Status is applied to Muslims by Sharia courts. In Sharia courts, a woman's testimony is worth only half of a man's.

=== Tajikistan ===
The government is declared to be secular in the constitution.

=== Thailand ===
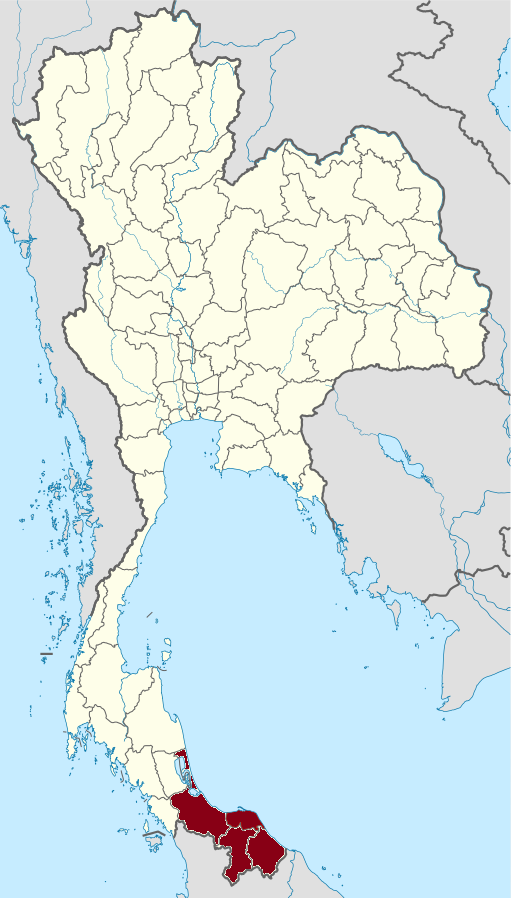
Sharia provinces in Thailand

In Yala, Narathiwat, Pattani and Satun provinces, Sharia is allowed for settling family and inheritance issues under a 1946 law.

The remaining provinces of Thailand have a civil law system with common law influences.

=== Turkey ===
As part of Atatürk's reforms, Sharia was abolished in April 1924, with the Law Regarding the Abolition of Islamic Law Courts and Amendments Regarding the Court Organization.

=== Turkmenistan ===
Article 11 of the constitution declares that religious groups are separate from the state and the state educational system. But the legal system is civil law with Islamic influences.

=== United Arab Emirates ===
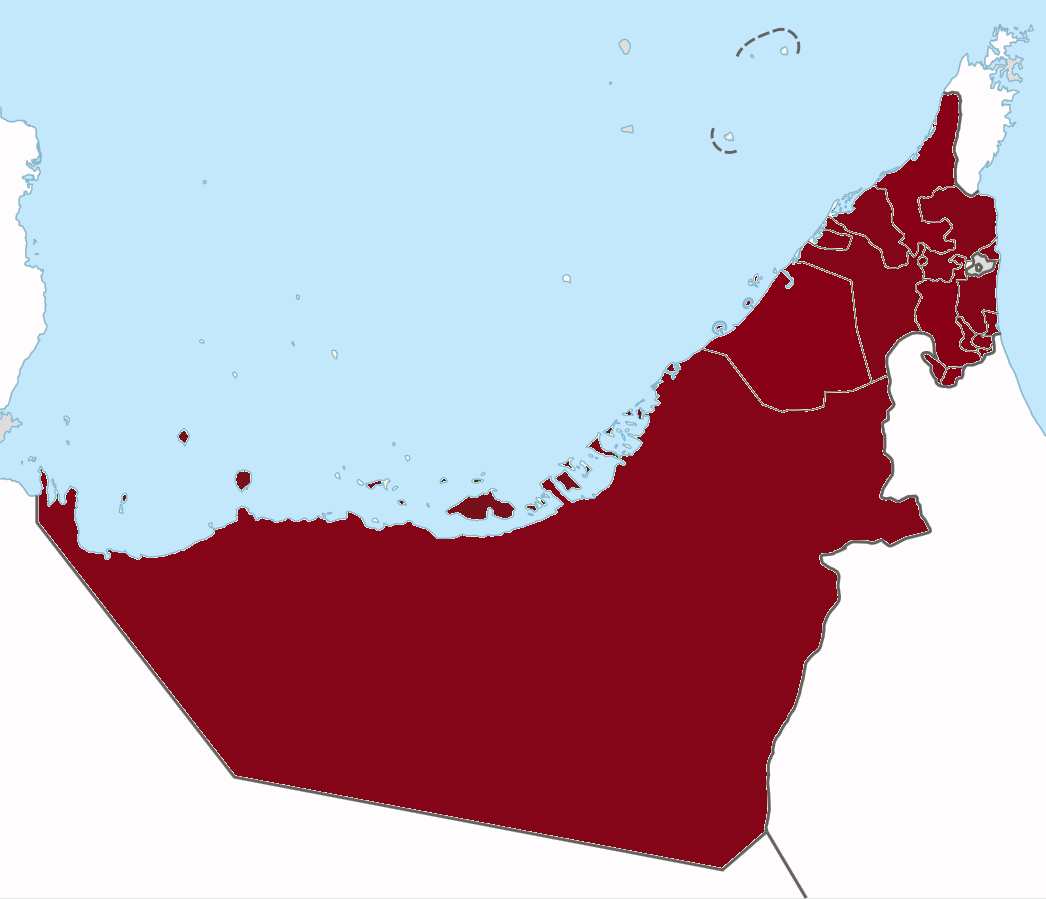
Sharia applies in personal status issues. Sharia applies to personal status issues and criminal proceedings.

Since September 2020, Sharia is applied to matters of personal status for Muslims and to determine blood money amounts, while other aspects of the law, including criminal law and non-Muslim personal status is governed by civil law. The federal and local court systems comprises Sharia courts and civil courts.

In September 2020, corporal punishment was officially removed as a legal form of punishment under UAE federal law. Article 1 of the Federal Penal Code was amended in 2020 to state that Sharia applies only to retribution and blood money punishments and the decree defined legal forms of punishment are retribution and blood money punishments, capital punishment, life imprisonment, temporary imprisonment incarceration, detention, and fines. Previously the article stated that "provisions of the Islamic Law shall apply to the crimes of doctrinal punishment, punitive punishment and blood money" making flogging, stoning, amputation, and crucifixion technically legal punishments for criminal offences such as adultery, pre-marital sex, and drug or alcohol consumption.

=== Uzbekistan ===
Uzbekistan has a civil law system.

=== Yemen ===
Law 20/1992 regulates personal status. The constitution mentions Sharia. Penal law provides for application of hadd penalties for certain crimes, although the extent of implementation is unclear. Article 263 of the 1994 penal code states that "the adulterer and adulteress without suspicion or coercion are punished with whipping by one hundred strokes as a penalty if not married. [...] If the adulterer or the adulteress are married, they are punished by stoning them to death."

== Europe ==
=== Bosnia and Herzegovina ===
In spite of the fact that the country has a slight Muslim majority, it has a civil law system.

=== Germany ===
Under certain conditions, Sharia rules on domestic relations are recognized by German courts based on private international law if no party has German citizenship. As a result, cases such as marriage, divorce, as well as many personal cases cannot be handled under German law if it is between Muslims who are not citizens. The outcome in most circumstances must not violate the principles of the German legal system according to the ordre public.

=== Greece ===
Sharia applies in personal status issues (Muslim minority only) Sharia does not apply (Muslims subject to civil law)

In Western Thrace, under the terms of the 1920 Treaty of Sevres and 1923 Treaty of Lausanne, Sharia courts historically had exclusive jurisdiction over the Greek Muslim minority population in issues related to family law.

Since 2018, Muslims in the region have been given the choice of registering a civil marriage and pursuing civil cases in the national court system. The Treaty of Lausanne also allows for the establishment of waqfs.

Greece is the only country in the EU that officially recognizes sharia and the mufti institution.

In other parts of Greece, all people are subjected exclusively to the provisions of the civil code, regardless of their religion.

=== United Kingdom ===
England and Wales: Sharia councils, which have no legal status and no legal jurisdiction, are consulted by many Muslims as a source of religious guidance and as an instance granting religious divorces.

Providers of Islamic arbitration services (such as the Muslim Arbitration Tribunal) must follow existing arbitration legislation (specifically the Arbitration Act 1996) in order for their decisions to be legally enforceable. The same rule applies to non-religious arbitration providers and other faith-based bodies (including the Jewish beth din and Catholic canon law tribunals).

The operation of sharia councils in the UK has been politically controversial. A bill was introduced in the House of Lords by Caroline Cox, Baroness Cox seeking to restrict religious arbitration and mediation services and make it a criminal offence to falsely claim legal jurisdictions of a court, though it did not progress beyond first reading. In 2017, the UK Independence Party stated they would ban sharia courts. In 2018, the UK government commissioned a review into the operation of sharia law in England and Wales, and the Home Affairs Select Committee also conducted a similar inquiry.

In 2018, the High Court recognized sharia in a divorce ruling in 2018, noting that a Muslim couple married under Sharia will also be recognized under British law and that the woman may claim her share of assets in a divorce. This decision was overturned on appeal.

=== Slovenia ===
Sharia law is not valid in any circumstance. Slovenia has civil law system.

== Territories with limited recognition ==
=== Kosovo ===
Kosovo uses civil law.

=== Northern Cyprus ===
It has a secular legal system with heavy influence from the modern-day Turkish legal system. It is unclear if Northern Cyprus is a civil law system, or if it uses common law.

=== Palestine ===
The Egyptian personal status law of 1954 is applied. The personal status law is based on Sharia and regulates matters related to inheritance, marriage, divorce and child custody. Shari’a courts hear cases related to personal status. The testimony of a woman is worth only half of that of a man in cases related to marriage, divorce and child custody.

=== Sahrawi Arab Democratic Republic ===
Local qadis (Sharia judges) have jurisdiction over personal status and family law issues.

=== Somaliland ===
Islamic and customary law apply.

== See also ==
- Status of women's testimony in Islam
- Islam and secularism
- Ban on Sharia law
