= Sharia in Texas =

Application of Islamic religious law

Sharia has not had a significant legal application or influence throughout Texas’ history, and there are no Sharia courts in the state of Texas. However, recent political developments have brought more attention to Sharia in Texas and its growing Muslim population. Prominent Texan politicians such as Governor Greg Abbott, Attorney General Ken Paxton, and Lieutenant Governor Dan Patrick have generated significant political opposition to Sharia and Muslim organizations such as CAIR and EPIC City. Contemporary topics of discussion surrounding Sharia in Texas include the previously mentioned organizations CAIR and EPIC City, Muslim politicians and voters, the presence of Halal food in grocery stores, school voucher programs, and religious discrimination.

Sharia (literally “path” in Arabic) consists of the laws and behaviors that Muslims follow based on the divinely-revealed Quran, the customs and traditions of Muhammad known as the Sunnah, and the Hadith, or collection of reports about Muhammad's actions which are deemed halal, or permissible. Sharia encompasses belief, practice, and ethics, in addition to areas more typically associated with law, such as civil and penal law. Historically, these principles were implemented in a wide variety of contexts, producing plurality and flexibility in various historical contexts. In most Muslim countries, Sharia has been replaced by European legal codes and remains only as an influence in codified versions of family law. In modern states, Muslims generally engage with the Sharia in areas that govern their personal and spiritual lives. Because Sharia involves religious traditions that a secular state does not make decisions for, some Muslims turn to scholars or Islamic tribunals for providing spiritual guidance or religious rulings in accordance with Sharia, including marriage, divorce, or other family laws. Another important aspect of Sharia is halal foods - that is, foods which are permissible for Muslims to eat. Halal foods are often difficult for Muslims to access in America, especially in more rural areas. Some popular grocery chains like H-E-B have incorporated halal foods into their selections while others like Jana Food specifically cater to these diets. Businesses that sell halal foods must be certified under Texas state law.

European colonialism in the 19th and 20th centuries across the Muslim world had a significant impact on Sharia and its various interpretations. Jurists in this period utilized the legal process of takhayyur (selection) and talfiq (amalgamation) to draw from Sharia across various madhabs in the codification of legal systems adhering to Western standards and approaches. Modern perceptions of Sharia in the 21st century have been profoundly altered by the global War on Terror, American invasions of Iraq and Afghanistan, and Muslim immigration in Europe and the United States. Additionally, perceptions of Sharia in the West and non-Muslim nations are characterized by controversy and Islamophobia, and Sharia is often represented as oppositional with women's rights, pluralism, democracy, and global human rights.

== History of Muslims in Texas ==
=== Early history ===
Muslims first began migrating to the Americas as enslaved peoples as early as the 16th century. One of the first known Muslims to have migrated was Estevanico, an enslaved member of the Spanish Narváez Expedition in 1528. Estevanico and three other survivors were shipwrecked in east Texas, near modern Galveston, and continued to explore the American Southwest and Mexico until 1539, when he perished. As the Trans-Atlantic Slave Trade persisted, an estimated 10-30% of slaves brought to America were Muslim. During this time, many first generation immigrants resisted pressure to convert to Christianity. However, a significant factor in the difficulty of Islam being fully passed between generations was the structure of chattel slavery, in which men were disproportionately sold and families were intentionally broken up. As a result, a specific amount for the number of Muslim slaves is unclear.

=== 19th and 20th centuries ===
The Muslim population in the United States remained consistently low for the most part until 1870, when immigrants from the Ottoman Empire began to migrate in search of opportunity. Scholars estimate that by 1914 about 100,000 Muslim immigrants lived in America, with Texas having a population of 1,051 Muslims in 1910 and over 3,200 in 1920. Immigrants were drawn to Texas specifically due to the efforts of Texas' Bureau of Immigration and private commercial interests after the Civil War, marketing the state as a land of opportunity. Most of them found work as merchants and traders. However, immigration was halted by the Johnson-Reed Immigration Act of 1924 which set strict quotas on how many immigration, particularly excluding Eastern Europe, Africa, and Asia. This set precedent for American immigration policies for the next several decades, and the Muslim population remained stagnant across the country.

In 1965, the Hart-Cellar Immigration Act was passed with the intent of reversing the restrictive doctrine and eschewing the discriminatory quotas. As a result, the population of Muslims in America dramatically increased, with 2,780,000 people migrating from majority Muslim countries, and an estimated 1.1 million of them being Muslim.

=== Modern day ===
As of 2022, the Muslim population in Texas was about 421,972, making it the second largest religion in the state. This also makes among the top 5 Muslim populations by state. Houston has the largest population, ranging from 60,000 to 70,000 people and over 209 mosques and religious centers. Dallas-Fort Worth also has a large population of Muslims with over 44,000 people and 67 mosques, 62 Sunni and 5 Shia. Austin has over 15,000 Muslims, and other cities with notable Muslim populations include Midland, Odessa, and San Antonio.

== Council on American-Islamic Relations ==
The Council on American-Islamic Relations (CAIR) has been heavily scrutinized and accused of promoting Sharia by Republican lawmakers. CAIR is a Muslim civil rights organization that has facilitated counter-Islamophobia movements during post-9/11 society.

On November 18, 2025, Governor Greg Abbott declared CAIR as a foreign terrorist organization (FTO), claiming the organization as having links to Hamas and The Muslim Brotherhood. In 2008, CAIR was one of 200 entities with ties to the Holy Land Foundation, an Islamic charity organization based in Richardson, Texas labeled as a terrorist organization. The Holy Land Foundation was closed in 2001 on the grounds that it had funneled over 12 million dollars to Hamas. The families of The Holy Land Five claim all money ended up being donated lawfully as zakat (charitable donation) in the Palestinian territories, while the United States Department of the Treasury alleged that it "served Hamas ends by encouraging children to become suicide bombers and to recruit suicide bombers by offering support to their families."

Abbott claims CAIR advances "radical Islamism in Texas" and urged Attorney General Ken Paxton to regulate and strip the organization of its nonprofit status. On February 5, 2026, the Attorney General sued the Muslim Brotherhood, CAIR, and its separate chapters across Texas on the grounds of "engaging in terrorism", "transnational criminal organizations owning property", and "radical groups engaging in gang activities". Paxton claims CAIR has a single goal: "establish Sharia law, punish infidels, and overtake Texan institutions of power."

In response to claims by Governor Abbott, CAIR filed a lawsuit against the Governor, calling his declaration "defamatory and unconstitutional". The Texas branch of CAIR claimed the declaration was an effort to silence critics of Israel's genocide and to punish the organization for winning previous three federal lawsuits against Abbott. CAIR claims to only work to expand free speech, religious freedom, and racial equality for all Americans.

On April 7, 2026, Republican representatives unsuccessfully attempted to keep Muslim activists from testifying in the Texas State Board of Education, citing the FTO status of CAIR. The updated social studies curriculum removed learning about the Muslim origins of algebra and astronomy while Republicans unsuccessfully attempted to add a curriculum standard to describe the Islamic prophet Muhammad as someone who "married a minor" and "sexual assault, torture, and 'killing of Christian and Jews' occurred under his leadership".

== 2026 midterm election ==
Sharia law became a major issue in the 2026 Republican primary elections. Several Islamic organizations have become the targets of incumbent Republican politicians running for office. On November 18, 2025, Texas Governor Greg Abbott declared both CAIR (Council on American-Islamic Relations) and the Muslim Brotherhood as foreign terrorist organizations. On January 28, 2026, Abbott called for Texas Attorney General Ken Paxton to pursue litigation against CAIR targeting their ability to do business in the state of Texas. Paxton responded quickly, opening a lawsuit against CAIR and the Muslim Brotherhood a few days after receiving Abbott's letter. CAIR refuted the allegations that they are a foreign terrorist organization and sued Abbott claiming that he has no authority to declare them as such. Abbott won the March 3, 2026, primary and will advance to the general election as the Republican nominee for Texas Governor.

Sharia law became a particularly contentious issue among the candidates running for the 2026 Republican Senate nomination in Texas. Incumbent Republican Senator John Cornyn faced a competitive primary run-off election. Cornyn's opponent, Attorney General Ken Paxton, criticized his support of an Afghan refugee program. U.S. Representative Wesley Hunt, who came in third in the first round of voting and did not advance to the run-off, dubbed Cornyn "Sharia John," citing past comments he made concerning Ramadan. Cornyn himself has run several television ads on the issue, raising concerns about the dangers of radical Islam. Cornyn also suggested that Paxton was unfit to defend Texans from Sharia law, referencing Paxton's past political scandals. In addition, Cornyn highlighted the relationship between Paxton and a lawyer representing East Plano Islamic Center's developers (also known as EPIC city), as further evidence.

Sharia law and Islam were prominent topics in the 2026 Republican primary race for Texas Attorney General. Aaron Reitz was the most outspoken in his criticism. On January 21, 2026, Reitz claimed in a television ad that millions of Muslims have immigrated to the United States. Reitz connected his claim of a larger population of Muslims in the United States to an alleged increase in terrorism and crime. Reitz then asserted that Muslims are trying to impose Sharia law on cities in Texas. Reitz's proposed solution to this issue was to use the power of the Texas Attorney General to either jail what he calls Islamists, or make a legal environment so hostile to them that they would leave the United States voluntarily. Reitz was eliminated in the March 3, 2026, primary and did not advance to the run-off. The run-off election is between U.S. Representative Chip Roy and Texas State Senator Mayes Middleton. Similar to Reitz, Roy has taken a strong stance against Sharia law. On December 18, 2025, Roy formed the Sharia-Free America Caucus with fellow Republican U.S. Representative from Texas, Keith Self. Roy and Self both sponsored a bill in the U.S. House of Representatives that would prohibit anyone practicing Sharia law from immigrating to the United States. The bill would also require the deportation of anyone practicing Sharia law and residing in the United States if they are not a U.S. citizen. In addition, Roy has come out in favor of amending the Texas Constitution to "protect Texas from being Islamified by radical Marxists." Roy alleges that due to the large Muslim population and a hostile Middle Eastern culture, parts of the Dallas-Fort Worth metro area have become inaccessible to Texan women. A deadly shooting in Austin by a U.S. citizen born in Senegal, wearing a "property of Allah" shirt, caused Roy to call for a cessation of all immigration to the U.S. Roy's opponent, Middleton, while not nearly as vocal on the issue, has pledged to "stop Sharia law." Reitz, Roy, and Middleton all agree with and support the actions by Gov. Abbott and AG Paxton against CAIR and EPIC city. Both Reitz and Roy have stated that they would continue targeting Islamic organizations in Texas if elected Attorney General.

Before the March 3, 2026, primary, Texas Lieutenant Governor Dan Patrick named "preventing Sharia law" as one of his top concerns for the 90th Texas Legislature. Patrick tasked the Senate State Affairs Committee to investigate housing discrimination and foreign influence in Texas public schools. These investigations were prompted by the EPIC City development and CAIR's alleged involvement in a Grapevine-Colleyville ISD sports event. Patrick won the March 3, 2026, primary and will advance to the general election as the Republican nominee for Texas Lieutenant Governor.

Bo French, the unsuccessful Republican candidate for Texas Railroad Commissioner, harshly criticized Islam and Sharia law on the campaign trail. French was a guest speaker on the "Don't Sharia My Texas" panel at the Conservative Political Action Conference (CPAC) in Grapevine. While there, French asserted that Sharia law and Islam refer to the same thing. French then speculated that if Islam "conquers" Texas, then Islam would gain control over the entire United States. French goes on to ponder, "You know what, maybe I am Islamophobic. I am afraid of what they're going to do to our great country." Earlier in the campaign, French said he would give extra scrutiny to Islamic and Chinese foreign land owners in Texas if elected Railroad Commissioner. French came in second place in the March 3, 2026, primary and moved on to a run-off election with incumbent Railroad Commissioner Jim Wright.

Texas State Representative Steve Toth ran for Texas's 2nd district, challenging incumbent Republican U.S. representative Dan Crenshaw. Toth criticized Crenshaw for his support of resettling Afghan refugees to the United States after the U.S. military's withdrawal from Afghanistan in 2021. Crenshaw defended his position by calling Toth's attacks disgraceful and suggesting that Afghans who assisted the U.S. military in Afghanistan earned the aid they received. Crenshaw lost to Toth in the March 3, 2026, primary.

Valentina Gomez ran for Congress in Texas's 31st district. In the video where she announced she was running for Congress, Gomez burned a Quran and stated: "your daughters will be raped and your sons beheaded, unless we stop Islam once and for all." Gomez received 10% of the vote in the March 3, 2026 primary, losing to incumbent Republican U.S. representative John Carter.

Rod Vilhauer ran for Frisco Mayor in the 2026 election. During the campaign, Vilhauer claimed that Sharia law is incompatible with the U.S. Constitution. Vilhauer asserted that Sharia law is "not a religion" and is instead a competing legal framework with Texas and U.S. law. However, Vilhauer could not cite any examples of conflicts with Sharia law arising in Frisco or the local area. No candidate received 50% of the vote in the May 2 Frisco Mayoral election. Vilhauer will advance to a run-off election with his opponent Mark Hill.

Neither Sharia law nor Islam were major topics in the 2026 Democratic primaries. Democratic nominee for U.S. Senator in Texas, James Talarico, considers the concerns over Sharia law and Islam to be distractions from other more important issues.

== Muslim politicians in Texas ==
No Muslim politicians in Texas base their campaigns on implementing Sharia law. Individuals such as Texas House Representative Suleman Lalani campaigned on universal representation for all constituents. Rather than appeal exclusively to Muslim voters in District 76 (Fort Bend County), Lalani, in his election campaigns, ran on secular issues that voters were facing. In office, Lalani is known for his work in uniting an interfaith caucus against religious discrimination. The only other Texas Representative who adheres to the Islamic faith is Salman Bhojani, representative of District 92 (Tarrant County). Similar to Lalani, Bhojani ran on secular issues such as religious freedom. In 2025, Richardson, Texas, elected Amir Omar as the first Muslim mayor to hold office in North Texas. Since entering the office, Omar has dedicated his role to improving the city rather than religion.

Many non-Muslim politicians in Texas have centered their campaigns on banning Sharia law. Keller Mayor Armin Mizani directed the Keller City Council to vote on rejecting foreign legal systems, specifically Sharia law. Once this issue became more prominent in Texas, the terminology of the council was later changed and affirmed constitutional leadership. After this controversy, Armin Mizani won the Republican Primary for Texas House Representative of District 98 (Tarrant County) after Giovanni Capriglone abdicated his seat and chose to not run for re-election. More influential Texas politicians, such as Governor Greg Abbott and Representative Chip Roy have spoken out against Sharia law in Texas.

Other notable controversies in recent years centered around concerns over Muslim politicians. In a local GOP council in Tarrant county, Shahid Shafi, the vice-chairman of the county's GOP, was subjected to a vote by his own members to remove him from office due to his faith. This issue quickly garnered national attention and debates on the legality of such a vote. Ultimately, the vote failed to remove Shafi from office with the democratic majority voting in favor of Shafi keeping his position. Yet, after the vote was unsuccessful, Shafi left his position willingly.

== School-voucher program ==
As Texas debates who can participate in the newly established school voucher program, questions have emerged about whether public funds could indirectly be supporting the teaching of Sharia through private school choice initiatives or be backed by those with ties to Sharia. In May 2025, Governor Greg Abbot signed into law Senate Bill 2 which allocated nearly $1 billion for the establishment of the Texas Education Freedom Accounts program. The program's eligibility is open to all lawfully present Texas families with the selection being done through a lottery process. The program accepted and permitted a wide range of schools, including religious schools.

In December 2025, Acting Comptroller Kelly Hancock asked Attorney General Ken Paxton on whether schools that had ties to groups labeled under Texas law such as foreign terrorist organizations could be disqualified from the program. Paxton concluded that the Comptroller had full authority to assess the eligibility of private schools who could participate in the program. It had been alleged by Hancock that the Islamic schools being excluded had been accredited by Cognia and had hosted some events with CAIR.

In March 2026, Abbot would respond on X (formerly Twitter) to the comments being made on Islamic schools being excluded from the voucher program, stating, "We don't want school choice funds going to radical Islamic indoctrination with historic connections to terrorism."

Earlier in March, two federal lawsuits originating in Houston accused the state of religious discrimination. Mehdi Cherkaoui filed a lawsuit on behalf of Houston Qur'an Academy Spring, arguing that Islamic schools had been targeted against acceptance despite possessing the qualifications necessary. The lawsuit would claim Hancock was using Abbot's designation of CAIR as a terrorist organization to attribute "Islamic ties" to deny any Islamic school from being eligible for the program. The lawsuit would also reveal that no accredited Islamic school had been approved for the program since the application process opened for parents on February 4. Both lawsuits made similar requests of asking the court to require the state to accept all Islamic schools who were eligible and not to deny approval on the basis of religious identity or allegations.

On March 17, the U.S. District Judge Alfred Bennet ordered the family application deadline to be extended to March 31 and granted a temporary restraining order to the Muslim parents and Islamic schools who filed the lawsuit along with ordering the Comptroller to provide the plaintiff schools with the registration link within 24 hours. By March 31, the Comptroller's office announced that every Islamic school that applied and was eligible had been approved.

The two federal lawsuits remain active and ongoing as a First Amendment religious-discrimination challenge as CAIR's national deputy director, Edward Ahmed Mitchell, who claims these lawsuits to be a "classic First Amendment case." The next court hearing for the lawsuits is scheduled for April 24.
