= Ilyang Logistics =

Ilyang Logistics Co, Ltd. (Korean: 일양택배) is a Korean logistics and shipping company. Headquartered in Seoul, Korea, it was established in 2001. It offers local and worldwide logistics and express mail services. The company is based in Seoul with several branches in Korea and a special branch in Ridgefield, New Jersey, together known as the Ilyang Logistics Group. The "Ilyang Logistics" CEO is Choi Song (최송).

== Group companies ==
- DHL Korea (placement by DHL)
- Brinks Korea (placement by The Brink's Company)
- Ilyang Express
- Ilyang Export Packing (formerly Ilwoo Logistics)
- Ilwoo Agency

== Business products ==
- Domestic Document Exchange Logistic Service
- Small-cargo Express Logistic Service
- US Visa Logistic Service
- Credit Card Logistic Service
- Warehouse Service
- Bank Exchange Logistic Service
- Import Cargo Logistic Service
- Airline Express Logistic Service
- Shopping Mall Logistic Service

== See also ==
- Economy of South Korea
- DHL
- The Brink's Company
