= Brink's =

Security company

The Brink's Company
- Type: Public
- Traded as: NYSE: BCO; S&P 400 component
- Industry: Logistics, Security
- Founded: 1859; 167 years ago
- Founder: Perry Brink
- Headquarters: Richmond, Virginia, U.S.
- Number of locations: 1,238 branches and 15,889 vehicles (2025)
- Key people: Mark Eubanks (president & CEO)
- Products: Armored transport, Safes, ATMs
- Revenue: ▲US$5.26 billion (2025)
- Operating income: ▲US$586 million (2025)
- Net income: ▼US$200 million (2025)
- Total assets: ▲US$7.34 billion (2025)
- Total equity: ▲US$278 million (2025)
- Number of employees: 63,600 (2025)
- Website: brinks.com

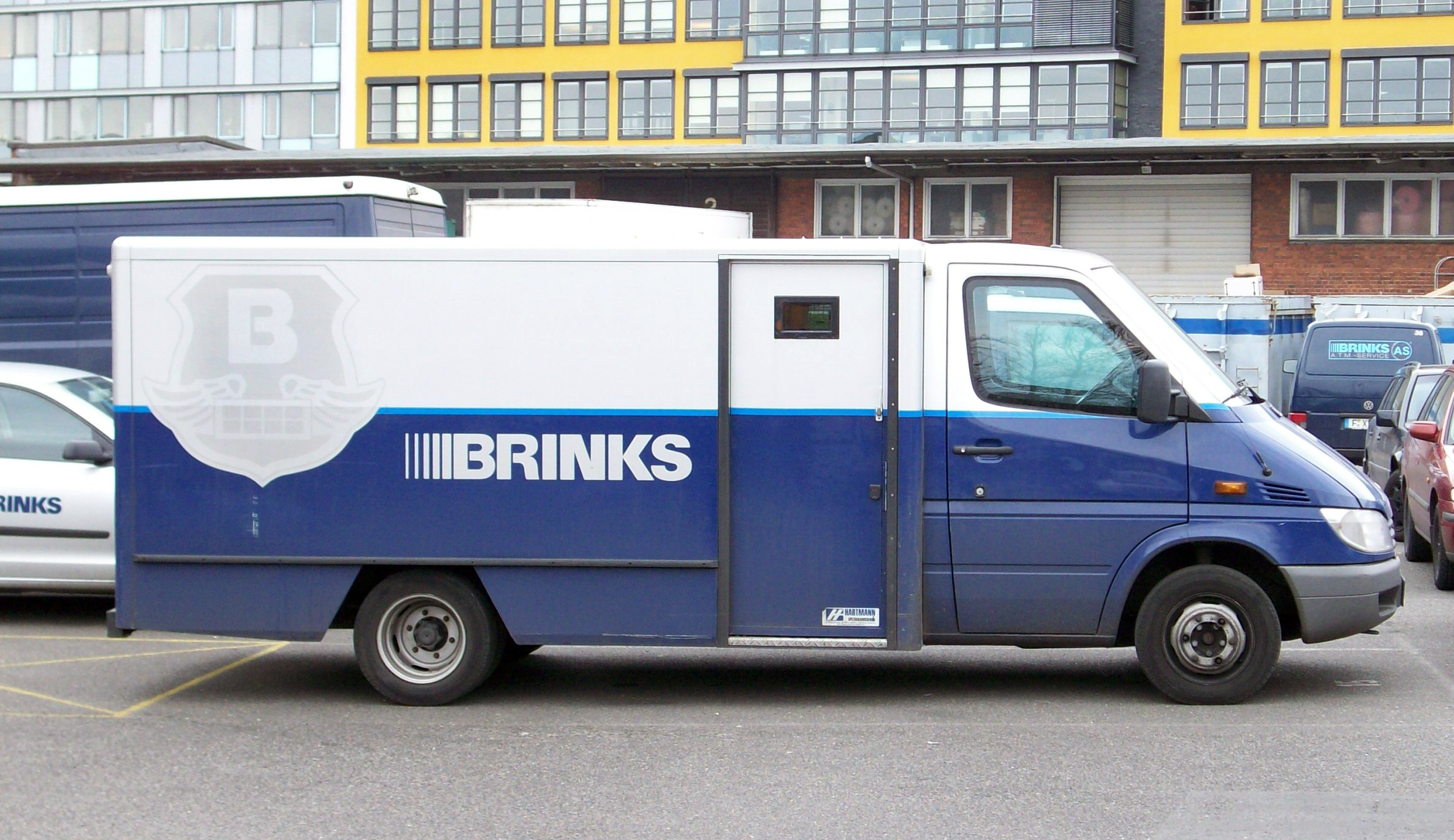
A Brink's van in Germany in 2008

The Brink's Company is an American cash handling company, headquartered in Richmond, Virginia. Its operations include cash-in-transit, ATM replenishment & maintenance, and cash management & payment services, such as vault outsourcing, money processing, intelligent safe services, and international transportation of valuables.

== Operations ==
Brink's is popularly known for its bullet-resistant armored trucks which carry money and valuable goods (the service once used to transport the Hope Diamond from an auction to the buyer's home). Brink's is a provider of security services to banks, retailers, governments, mints and jewelers. Founded in 1859 by Perry and Fidelia Brink of Chicago, Illinois, Brink's business evolved from local armored transportation services to providing corporate financial logistics and international secure transportation.

In 1962, Brink's was acquired by Pittston, a coal company. Burlington Air Express was acquired in 1982. Brink's Home Security was started in 1983. Pittston sold off its coal assets in the 2000s and renamed the company Brink's.

Burlington Air Express was renamed BAX Global in 1997, and was sold to Deutsche Bahn for $1.1 billion in 2006.

In January 2012, Brink's acquired Kheops, SAS, a provider of logistics software and related services in France, for approximately $17 million. This acquisition gave the company proprietary control of software used primarily in cash-in-transit and money processing operations in France.

A significant portion of Brink's business is conducted internationally, with 82% of $3.9 billion in revenues earned outside the United States in 2013. The majority of Brink's consolidated revenues in 2013 was earned in operations located in nine countries, each contributing in excess of $100 million of revenues. The 2013 revenues from these countries totaled $3.0 billion or 79% of consolidated revenues. These operations, in declining order of revenues, were the U.S., France, Mexico, Brazil, Venezuela, Canada, Colombia, Argentina and the Netherlands.

On January 31, 2013, Brink's acquired Brazil-based Rede Transacoes Eletronicas Ltda. ("Redetrel") for approximately $26 million. Redetrel distributes electronic prepaid products, including mobile phone airtime, via a network of approximately 20,000 retail locations across Brazil. Redetrel's strong distribution network supplements Brink's existing payments business, ePago, which has operations in Brazil, Mexico, Colombia and Panama.

== Discontinued operations ==
In November 2010, Brink's former cash-in-transit (CIT) operations in Belgium filed for bankruptcy, after local union employees rejected a restructuring plan, and was placed in bankruptcy on February 2, 2011. Brink's deconsolidated the Belgium subsidiary in 2010. However, in 2021 Brink's returned to Belgium and took over G4S's Cash Solutions division.

In 2012, Brink's agreed to sell its cash-in-transit operations in Germany and Poland, and event security operations in France, and the company completed the divestiture of its guarding operations in Morocco, in December 2012.

In May 2014, Brink's US decided to cease their cash-in-transit operations throughout Australia. Armaguard made an offer to purchase Brink's Australia's CIT operations, and Brink's is continuing their precious goods logistics business within Australia.

== Home security ==
Brink's began offering home security alarm systems in 1982. In 2008, it was spun off into a separate publicly traded company, despite accounting for 15% of the company's revenue that year. The company rebranded as Broadview Security in 2009 with a massive advertising campaign.

The ads were widely criticized as unscrupulous, fear-mongering, and seen as exaggerating the capabilities of home security systems. Unflattering parodies of Broadview's TV commercials, mocking the company's attempts to manipulate consumers, were posted online, along with a filmed Saturday Night Live sketch featuring Andy Samberg and Bill Hader.

In 2010, Broadview was sold to Tyco International, then-owner of ADT, for $2 billion. The acquisition closed in mid-2010, after which the Broadview name and product line were discontinued, with its operations merged into ADT. The merger combined the two largest home security providers in the United States, adding Broadview's 1.3 million customer accounts to ADT's existing customer base of 7.4 million.

Brink's later re-entered the home security industry in 2018, through a trademark licensing deal with Monitronics International, which currently offers services under the name Brink's Home.

== Lock manufacturing ==
Brink's-branded door locks and padlocks have been manufactured and sold under license by California-based Hampton Products since 1998.

== Notable incidents ==
=== 1950 robbery ===
The Great Brink's Robbery was an armed robbery of the Brink's Building at the corner of Prince St. and Commercial St. in the North End of Boston, Massachusetts, on the night of January 17, 1950. Led by Boston small-time criminal Tony "Fats" Pino, 11 men broke in and stole $1,218,211.29 in cash, and $1,557,183.83 in checks, money orders, and other securities. At the time, it was the largest robbery in the history of the United States. Skillfully executed with only a bare minimum of clues left at the crime scene, the robbery was billed as "the crime of the century".

All 11 members of the gang were arrested six years later, and all were paroled and released by 1971, except for Joseph "Big Joe" McGinnis, the originator of the heist, who died in prison. Despite ongoing efforts by the Federal Bureau of Investigation and local authorities, only $57,000 of the initial $2.7 million stolen was ever recovered.

=== 1981 attempted robbery ===
On October 20, 1981, members of Weather Underground and Black Liberation Army attempted an armed robbery of a Brink's armored car in Nanuet, New York. The robbery resulted in a shootout that left two police officers, Edward O'Grady and Waverly Brown, and a Brink's security guard, Peter Paige, dead. Paige's partner, Joe Trombino, was severely wounded in the gun battle but survived; he later died at the World Trade Center during the September 11 attacks.

=== 1983 Brink's-Mat robbery ===
On November 26, 1983, there was an armed robbery at a warehouse near London's Heathrow Airport, operated by Brink's-Mat, a former joint venture between Brink's and the London-based company MAT Transport, which specialized in the transportation of valuable goods. Three tonnes of gold bullion (worth £26 million) was stolen. Most of the gold has never been recovered.

=== 1993 New York robbery ===
On January 5, 1993, $7.4 million was stolen from the Brink's Armored Car Depot in Rochester, New York, the fifth largest robbery in US history. Four men, Sam Millar, Patrick Moloney, former Rochester Police officer Thomas O'Connor, and Charles McCormick, all of whom had ties to the Provisional Irish Republican Army, were accused.

=== 2008 "D. B. Tuber" robbery ===
On September 30, 2008, in Monroe, Washington, a Brink's armored car pulled up to make a delivery to the Bank of America. A landscaper, who was working the grounds and wearing a blue shirt, blue hat, and yellow safety vest, approached the armored car guard, pepper-sprayed him, stole $400,000 in cash, and escaped on an inner tube on the nearby Woods Creek. When police arrived, they found the bank's parking lot was full of men wearing clothing identical to the mysterious robber's. All were "hired" by a phony ad, placed on Craigslist by a culprit the media dubbed "D.B. Tuber" (after famed hijacker, D. B. Cooper), instructing them to show up at the bank at the same time, wearing a blue shirt, blue hat, and yellow safety vest. Months later, the FBI received a tip from a very attentive homeless man who had witnessed a "practice run" weeks prior to the robbery. DNA evidence later convicted former college football player Anthony Curcio of the crime.

=== 2013 Brussels Airport diamond heist ===
On 18 February 2013, eight masked gunmen, in two cars with police markings, stole approximately €38 million worth of diamonds by attacking in a very small time window during which they were being transferred from a Brink's armored van to a Swiss-bound Fokker 100 operated by Helvetic Airways. The Fokker 100 was on the apron at Brussels Airport, Belgium, just before 20:00 CET. The heist was accomplished without a shot being fired.

=== 2014 return of lost money bag ===
In May 2014, California resident Joe Cornell found a Brink's bag with $125,000 inside; Cornell saw the bag of cash accidentally fall out of the back of a Brink's transport car as it drove over the railroad tracks in downtown Fresno. Cornell returned the bag of cash claiming, "it was the right thing to do." Brink's thanked the man for his honesty with a $5,000 reward and a $5,000 donation in Cornell's name to The Salvation Army, where he works.

=== 2022 Lebec Flying J heist ===
On July 11, 2022, approximately $100 million to $150 million worth of jewelry, luxury watches, and other valuables were stolen from a Brink's truck within a 27-minute window whilst the two drivers were at a Flying J rest stop on I-5 in Lebec, California. One driver had entered the building to get food while the other was sleeping inside the vehicle. The merchandise, which had been loaded the day before in San Francisco, was en route to a trade show in Pasadena. Thirteen jewelry companies sued Brink's over payout for the incident, and Brink's filed a countersuit, alleging that the companies deliberately undervalued the cost of their merchandise during transit. The incident remains under investigation by the FBI and the Los Angeles Sheriff's Department's Major Crimes Bureau.

=== 2023 Toronto airport heist ===
In April 2023, over CAD $20 million of gold and high-valued goods were stolen from Toronto Pearson International Airport. The items were stolen from an Air Canada Cargo facility after the perpetrator used a fake document to gain access into the facility. Brink's, which was entrusted with arranging the shipment, sued Air Canada for the theft citing that the facility's relaxed security system was the main cause of the theft. Subsequently, police charged nine suspects including two individuals who were Air Canada employees.

=== Major heist at Brink's in Chile 2024 ===
On August 16, 2024, a major heist occurred at a Brink's branch in the O'Higgins region of Chile. The planning for the robbery began in early July and involved a gang of at least 25 people. The gang acquired stolen vehicles, firearms, disguises, and internal information from the company. They were assisted by two Brink's employees: a cashier and a guard, the latter having contributed to the entering of the gang, unlocking the doors for them, and pretending to start the alarm and acting as if it doesn't work, this helped the gang easily steal the money from the vault.

On the day of the heist, the gang executed several distraction tactics, such as shooting and burning vehicles, while part of the group threatened employees with an assault rifle and others, disguised as Brink's staff, entered the premises. The estimated haul is 12 billion pesos (around $13 million), which is still being searched for.

Following the heist, a police chase led to the arrest of several suspects on a nearby agricultural property, where weapons and ammunition were seized.

On August 20, 18 of the arrested individuals were formally charged with serious crimes. It was also revealed that one of the seized weapons had been used in violent incidents. The police faced criticism for their handling of prior information about the robbery, leading to an administrative investigation into potential responsibilities. The judge ordered preventive detention for the suspects and set an eight-month investigation period.

== Recent corporate developments ==
In October 2015, Brink's activist investor Starboard Value LP announced it had raised its stake in the company to around 12.4%. Later that year, Brink's responded to Texas RFI 212P with their perspective on a solution for Texas HB 483, establishing the Texas Bullion Depository.

In April 2017, it was announced that Brink's had chosen the FN Herstal FN 509 9mm to be the new sidearm for their armed guards.

In August 2018, Brink's Inc. acquired Dunbar Armored for $520 million.

In April 2021, Brink's Inc. acquired Payment Alliance International for $213 Million.

In February 2026, Brink's agreed to acquire NCR Atleos for a total enterprise value of $6.6 billion in a cash-and-stock deal.
