= Giovanni Capriglione =

American politician (born 1973)

Member of the Texas House of Representatives from the 98th district
- Incumbent
- Assumed office January 8, 2013
- Preceded by: Vicki Truitt
- Succeeded by: Armin Mizani (elect)

Personal details
- Born: March 8, 1973 (age 53)
- Party: Republican
- Spouse: Elisa Capriglione
- Children: 3
- Education: Worcester Polytechnic Institute (BS); Santa Clara University (MBA)
- Website: Campaign website

Giovanni Capriglione (born March 8, 1973) is an American politician. He is a Republican member of the Texas House of Representatives, having represented district 98 since 2013.

== Early life and education ==
Capriglione studied for a Bachelor of Science in physics at Worcester Polytechnic Institute in Worcester, Massachusetts, and then a Master of Business Administration at Santa Clara University in Santa Clara, California.

== Political career ==
In the 2012 Republican primary election, Capriglione, with 55.6 percent of the vote, unseated the incumbent Vicki Truitt of Keller in Tarrant County. Truitt, who had held the seat since 1999, polled the remaining 44.4 percent of the ballots cast. He won the 2012 general election with 85.6 percent of the vote against the Libertarian Party candidate Michael Goolsby who polled the remaining 14.4 percent. Capriglione went unopposed in the 2014 primary and general elections.

During the 83rd Legislative Session, Capriglione caused controversy by voting "nay" on HB 950 also known as "the equal pay for women act".

Capriglione authored House Bill 1280, the Human Life Protection Act of 2021, also known as the Texas trigger law, which was signed into law by Governor Abbott in July 2021. The Texas trigger law outlaws any abortion starting thirty days after the Supreme Court overrules Roe v. Wade, without exception for rape, incest or viability of the fetus.

In the 84th Legislature Giovanni Capriglione sits on three committees: the House Appropriations Committee, the Investment and Financial Services Committee and the Local & Consent Calendars Committee. Rep. Capriglione also serves as the Chairman of the Sub-Committee on State & Local Debt. In 2015, Rep. Capriglione was elected Secretary of the House Energy Caucus and is a member of the Innovation & Technology Caucus. In the 83rd Legislature, Rep. Capriglione served on two committees: Government Efficiency and Reform and International Trade and Intergovernmental Affairs.

In 2015 he passed HB 1295, a new law that dramatically improves public access to government contracts given to elected officials. His bill was described by the San Antonio Express-News as the most important ethics bill of the 84th Legislative Session. Rep. Capriglione also passed HB 483 authorizing the creation of the Texas Bullion Depository to insure that Texas has first rights to its gold.

In the general election held on November 6, 2018, Capriglione won his fourth legislative term. With 56,694 votes (68.3 percent), he defeated the Democrat Mica J. Ringo, who polled 24,294 (29.3 percent). Another 2,002 ballots (2.4 percent) went to the Libertarian Party choice, H. Todd J. Moore. In 2025, he co-wrote SB 21, a bill that created the Texas Strategic Bitcoin Reserve and allow the State of Texas to purchase digital cryptocurrency as a strategic reserve. The bill was signed into law by Governor Greg Abbott on June 22, 2025. Following Arizona and New Hampshire, Texas is the third state to enact legislation creating a bitcoin reserve on the state level.

== Personal life ==
Capriglione lives in Southlake in suburban Tarrant County. He and his wife, Elisa, whom he married in 2000, have three children.

Capriglione owns a private equity management company focusing on businesses located in Texas. He has also worked as a vice president of a private equity firm and prior to that was employed by various computer engineering companies.

=== Extramarital affair and alleged funding of abortions ===
In July 2025, conservative news website Current Revolt uploaded a 25-minute video interview with Alex Grace, a former exotic dancer, in which she alleged that she had a 17-year affair with Capriglione. In the interview, Grace alleges that Capriglione paid her for "meetups" and "funded several abortions for his own personal gain", but declined to provide additional details on the alleged abortions. Capriglione admitted to the affair in a statement following the video's publication, but did not confirm that it was with Grace, said that his wife and family had forgiven him, and rejected claims that he had paid for her to get an abortion.
