= Vicki Truitt =

American politician

Member of the Texas House of Representatives from the 98th district
- In office 1999–2013
- Succeeded by: Giovanni Capriglione

Personal details
- Born: February 18, 1954 (age 72)
- Party: Republican
- Occupation: Lobbyist

Vicki Truitt (born February 18, 1954) is an American politician who was a Republican member of the Texas House of Representatives for District 98. First elected in 1998, she served for fourteen years until she was defeated in the Republican primary election in 2012.

== Life ==
In 1984, Truitt established and still owns a small health care consulting company operated by her husband which focuses on medical staff development. She has worked for the medical staff of John Peter Smith Hospital, in administration at Parkland Memorial Hospital, and as a physician recruiter.

In the 2012 Republican primary election, Truitt was unseated in the primary election by Giovanni Capriglione.

Truitt became noted in the wider popular culture in a segment of episode 14, season 1, of Last Week Tonight with John Oliver, where she, in a House session, noted Gary Elkins's conflict of interest at being opposed to bigger regulation of the payday loan industry while owning several payday loan stores himself (known as Power Finance Texas). The episode also notes she later became a lobbyist for ACE Cash Express, one of Elkins's competitors.

== Committee assignments ==
- Pensions, Investments & Financial Services Committee (Chair)
- Public Health Committee
- Appropriations
- Federal Economic Stabilization Funding, Select
