= David Yerushalmi =

American lawyer, political activist (b. 1956)

David Yerushalmi (born 1956) is an American lawyer and political activist who is the driving counsel behind the anti-sharia movement in the United States. Along with Robert Muise, he is co-founder and senior counsel of the American Freedom Law Center. He is also general counsel to the Center for Security Policy in Washington, D.C., a national security think tank founded by Frank Gaffney described as far-right and conspiracist.

An Orthodox Jew from Brooklyn, Yerushalmi has been highly critical of left-wing Jews, "progressive elites", and African Americans, and has been described by the Southern Poverty Law Center as "a key figure in the U.S. anti-Muslim hate movement". Yerushalmi has been described as a leader of the counter-jihad movement, and as Stop Islamization of America's "in-house lawyer".

== Career ==
=== Public policy ===
In the 1990s, Yerushalmi was of counsel and senior policy research director for the Institute for Advanced Strategic and Political Studies, a neoconservative Israeli think tank with offices in Jerusalem and Washington, D. C. Yerushalmi published an article on sharia-compliant finance Islamic law as a "Black Box" in the Utah Law Review (2008, Issue 3). Yerushalmi has no formal training in Sharia law.

==== American laws for American courts ====
Yerushalmi is the principal drafter of the American laws for American courts model legislation, which is an effort to prevent courts from taking foreign or international law into account; the legislation is aimed at banning sharia, Muslim religious law. The legislation has been enacted into law in several states, including Louisiana, Tennessee, Arizona, Kansas, and Oklahoma.

The American Bar Association (ABA) generally opposes such legislation proposed by Yerushalmi because it is "duplicative of safeguards that are already enshrined in federal and state law". Furthermore, the ABA states: "Initiatives that target an entire religion or stigmatize an entire religious community, such as those explicitly aimed at 'Sharia law', are inconsistent with some of the core principles and ideals of American jurisprudence."

=== Litigation ===
==== Dearborn missionaries ====
Yerushalmi has been involved in filing several lawsuits against the city of Dearborn, Michigan, in response to treatment of Christian missionaries preaching to Muslims at the city's Arab Festival. Members of one group, Acts 17 Apologetics, had been arrested for disturbance of the peace; a jury acquitted them, and Yerushalmi's suit against the city resulted in the latter settling with a public apology and $300,000 in damages. A judge threw out a similar case Yerushalmi had filed the same year on behalf of a group called Bible Believers; Yerushalmi had sued after the group were asked to leave the festival after speaking for over an hour, due to concerns of public safety and order. The case is currently being appealed to the Sixth Circuit Court of Appeals.

==== Bus advertisement controversies ====
Yerushalmi has represented the American Freedom Defense Initiative (AFDI), an organization founded by Pamela Geller and Robert Spencer, in several legal actions against various transportation authorities around the country. The lawsuits stem from transportation authorities' decision not to run proposed advertisements by AFDI, including one advertisement in Detroit that promotes a website recommending "refuge from Islam".

On January 31, 2012, Yerushalmi's legal group, the American Freedom Law Center (AFLC) filed a request for a preliminary injunction in the U.S. District Court for the Southern District of New York against the Metropolitan Transportation Authority of the State of New York (MTA), seeking to have the MTA run an AFDI "pro-Israel / anti-Jihad" bus advertisement. On Friday, July 20, 2012, federal judge Paul Engelmayer ruled that the MTA violated the First Amendment rights of AFDI when it rejected their advertisement. In July 2012, Engelmayer issued a final ruling, striking down the Metropolitan Transportation Authority of New York’s (MTA) "no-demeaning speech" restriction and ordering the MTA to display the advertisement.

The judge’s order converted an earlier preliminary injunction into a permanent injunction, and it declared that the MTA speech regulation violated the First Amendment right to free speech. The judge also awarded FDI nominal damages. Yerushalmi's subsequent effort to get advertisements critical of Islam to run on MTA property failed, after the agency changed its ad policy to prohibit bigoted material, which was upheld by the U.S. Court of Appeals for the Second Circuit.

On September 20, the American Freedom Law Center filed a federal lawsuit against the Washington Metro Area Transit Authority (WMATA) after the agency had refused to run similar proposed advertisement. WMATA had refused to run the advertisement "due to the situations [sic] happening around the world at this time", a reference to the attack on the U.S. diplomatic mission in Benghazi and other uprisings in the Middle East. On October 5, federal judge Rosemary M. Collyer, sitting in the United States District Court for the District of Columbia granted the Law Center's request on behalf of its clients for an injunction to halt WMATA's censorship of the advertisement. Collyer ordered the "Washington Metropolitan Area Transit Authority [to] display Plaintiffs’ advertisement no later than 5 p.m. on October 8, 2012."

==== Pamela Geller defamation case ====
Yerushalmi represented anti-Islam activist Pamela Geller in a $10 million defamation lawsuit filed by Omar Tarazi, the lawyer for Rifqa Bary's parents. Geller, while blogging about the controversy extensively given her work at the American Freedom Defense Initiative, had criticized Tarazi during the Rifqa Bary litigation, which arose after the 17-year-old Rifqa converted from Islam to Christianity and ran away from her Ohio home in the summer of 2009 to take refuge with Christian friends in Florida. Bary had alleged that her father threatened to murder her in an honor killing. The case was settled out of court, with both sides claiming victory, when Geller agreed to remove the posts from her blog in exchange for the case being dropped.

==== Challenges to the Patient Protection and Affordable Care Act ====
In July 2014, the American Freedom Law Center sued Barack Obama, alleging that the Obama administration had violated its constitutional duty to "faithfully execute" the Patient Protection and Affordable Care Act). On May 15, 2015, the court dismissed the lawsuit for lack of standing.

In 2014, Yerushalmi and Muise took over the appeal of Cutler v. United States Department of Health and Human Services, another constitutional challenge to the ACA. The challenger in that case, Jeffrey Cutler, had a personal (but not religious) objection to the ACA's requirement that he buy insurance, and "filed suit challenging the religious exemption in the Affordable Care Act as an unconstitutional establishment of religion." The United States Court of Appeals for the District of Columbia Circuit rejected Cutler's claims, holding that his Establishment Clause claim failed on the merits and that he lacked standing to pursue an Equal Protection Clause claim.

On 2012, Yerushalmi and Muise of the AFLC represented Priests for Life (a Catholic anti-abortion organization) in a suit in the U.S. District Court for the Eastern District of New York challenging the contraceptive mandate provision of the ACA. The case was dismissed by U.S. District Judge Frederic Block for lack of ripeness because the government stated that the new implementing regulations would not be finalized until August 1, 2013. However, according to Yerushalmi, Priests for Life did secure a stipulation of non-enforcement from the government as a result of AFLC's motion for a preliminary injunction.

==== Constitutional challenge to bailout of AIG ====
Yerushalmi, as co-counsel, filed a federal lawsuit in 2009 against the U.S. Department of Treasury and the Board of Governors of the Federal Reserve, challenging a portion of the Emergency Economic Stabilization Act of 2008 that appropriated $40 billion to fund the federal government’s majority ownership interest in AIG. The lawsuit argued that the use of taxpayer dollars to fund Sharia-based loans made by AIG subsidiaries violated the Establishment Clause of the First Amendment. While federal Judge Lawrence P. Zatkoff rejected the request by the U.S. Department of Justice to dismiss the lawsuit, he ultimately granted summary judgment for the government in January 2011, finding that the religious involvement did not achieve the "excessive entanglement" required under earlier rulings. The decision was appealed to the Sixth Circuit Court of Appeals; on June 1, 2012, the Court of Appeals dismissed the case, ruling that the plaintiff did not have standing. On October 12, 2012, Yerushalmi and the American Freedom Law Center filed a petition for a writ of certiorari in the United States Supreme Court, asking the Court to review the appellate court's decision, which the Court denied.

== Allegations of racism ==
The Anti-Defamation League and Southern Poverty Law Center have described Yerushalmi's views as racist, anti-immigrant, and anti-Islamic. He stated, in a 2006 essay, that "most of the fundamental differences between the races are genetic". Yerushalmi is against what he views as a politically correct culture that doesn't openly discuss the reasons "the founding fathers did not give women or black slaves the right to vote." According to the SPLC, Yerushalmi has called blacks "the most murderous of peoples", and reportedly once called for undocumented immigrants to be placed in "special criminal camps", detained for three years, and then deported. Yerushalmi has denied ever having made racist statements. In 2011, he was listed by the Southern Poverty Law Center as one of 10 people in the United States' Anti-Muslim Inner Circle.

That same year, the Center for American Progress (CAP), a progressive Washington-based think-tank, published the widely-read report Fear, Inc.: The Roots of the Islamophobia Network in America, disclosing a network of anti-Islamic and anti-Muslim activists and campaigners, and their financiers, among which Yerushlami has significant place. The report was published as an online presentation Islamophobia Network. In 2015, CAP published an updated version, "Fear, Inc. 2.0".

He has recently been called one of three core activists and theorists of bigotry that flourished against Muslims and immigrants during the two Obama administrations.
