= Robert Muise =

American attorney (born 1965)

Robert J. Muise (born 1965) is an American attorney who specializes in constitutional law litigation. Along with attorney David Yerushalmi, he is co-founder and Senior Counsel of the American Freedom Law Center (AFLC). Before launching AFLC, Muise was Senior Trial Counsel at the Ann Arbor-based Thomas More Law Center, a conservative Christian law firm founded by Domino's Pizza founder Tom Monaghan.

Muise is noted for litigating the first Constitutional challenge to the Patient Protection and Affordable Care Act—commonly referred to as "Obamacare". On August 10, 2011, the National Law Journal named him the Appellate Lawyer of the Week for his legal efforts in this case. Other case highlights include participating in the defense of retired Lieutenant Colonel Jeffrey Chessani on charges related to the Haditha massacre and his successful defense of four Christian missionaries arrested in 2010 for breach of the peace while evangelizing at an Arab festival in Dearborn, Michigan (City of Dearborn v. David Wood, et al.,).

== Education and background ==
After receiving his undergraduate degree in 1987 from the College of the Holy Cross in Worcester, Massachusetts, Muise served thirteen years as an officer in the U.S. Marine Corps. He first served as an infantry officer for 9 years, during which time he participated in the Persian Gulf War.

While a captain on active duty, he attended Notre Dame Law School, graduating summa cum laude in 1997. Prior to resigning his commission in 2000, Muise served several years as a Marine Judge Advocate while attaining the rank of major. His personal military decorations include the Meritorious Service Medal, the Navy Commendation Medal, and the Navy Achievement Medal.

== Notable cases ==
=== United States v. LtCol Jeffrey Chessani, USMC ===
Muise was one of the attorneys defending Lt. Col. Jeffrey Chessani, a retired Marine battalion commander, during a court martial involving charges arising out of an insurgent attack against Marines in Haditha, Iraq in November 2005. The allegations against Chessani were for failing to properly report and investigate what is known as the Haditha killings.

=== American Freedom Defense Initiative v. Metropolitan Transit Authority ===
Muise, along with co-counsel David Yerushalmi, has represented the American Freedom Defense Initiative (AFDI) -- an anti-Islamic organization founded by Pamela Geller and Robert Spencer—in several legal actions against various transportation authorities around the country, who have refused to run several of AFDI's proposed pro-Israel/anti-sharia advertisements. On January 31, 2012, the American Freedom Law Center (AFLC) filed a request for a preliminary injunction in the U.S. District Court for the Southern District of New York against the Metropolitan Transportation Authority of the State of New York (MTA), seeking to have the MTA run an AFDI "pro-Israel / anti-Jihad" bus advertisement. On Friday, July 20, 2012, Federal Judge Paul Engelmayer ruled that the MTA violated the First Amendment rights of AFDI when it rejected their advertisement.

=== Constitutional challenges to the Patient Protection and Affordable Care Act ===
On March 23, 2010, Muise and co-counsel David Yerushalmi filed the first federal lawsuit challenging the constitutionality of the Patient Protection and Affordable Care Act, Thomas More Law Center et al. v. Pres. Obama et al. The case was filed in Detroit, Michigan on behalf of four Michigan residents who did not have health insurance and who objected to the Act's individual mandate, which required them to purchase insurance. On October 7, 2010, the judge ruled against the plaintiffs. The case was appealed to the Sixth Circuit Court of Appeals. which also ruled against the plaintiffs and upheld the individual mandate. Muise and Yerushalmi filed for a U.S. Supreme Court review, and in June 2012, the Supreme Court ruled against the plaintiffs and upheld the individual mandate. In 2012, Muise and Yerushalmi co-authored an article published in Duke University Press's online version of the Journal of Health Politics, Policy, and Law, entitled, "Wearing the Crown of Solomon? Chief Justice Roberts and the Affordable Care Act 'Tax'", which criticized the majority opinion written by Chief Justice John Roberts in the United States Supreme Court's ruling on the constitutionality of the Affordable Care Act.

In July 2014, American Freedom Law Center v. Obama, et al, was filed by the American Freedom Law Center which charged the Obama administration of violating its constitutional duty to "faithfully execute" the Patient Protection and Affordable Care Act. On May 15, 2015, the court dismissed the lawsuit for lack of standing.

In August 2014, Yerushalmi and Muise took over the appeal of Cutler v. United States Department of Health and Human Services, et al. Cutler had challenged the constitutionality of the Act, both on its face and as applied to him and his constituents. Cutler had asserted that the provision requiring individuals to obtain health insurance coverage or face monetary penalties violates the religion clause of the First Amendment to the United States Constitution and a previous Supreme Court Decision, "1947 Everson v Board of Education", and allows the government to favor one religion over another religion. Cutler sought a declaration that the Act is unconstitutional, invalid, and unenforceable. Cutler also sought to "roll back" the law to the status it had prior to 2014 on various grounds, arguing that the law now violates the Constitution by allowing unequal protection under the law (referring to the extension of pre-tax subsidies until October 1, 2016, but only if the state insurance commissioner agrees.) The court dismissed the case for lack of standing. Notice of appeal was filed by Cutler on July 25, 2014, and then Yerushalmi and Muise from the American Freedom Law Center were contacted to handle the appeal. On October 16, 2014 an injunction pending appeal was filed based on "unequal treatment under the law". AFLC's opening brief was filed on February 4, 2015. Oral arguments were presented by Muise on May 12, 2015.

In February 2014, Muise, on behalf of the American Freedom Law Center, was one of the attorneys who filed an appeal of the dismissal of a lawsuit filed on behalf of Priests for Life, a national, Catholic, pro-life organization based in New York City. The lawsuit challenged the constitutionality of the Health and Human Services contraceptive mandate. The case was dismissed by U.S. District Court Judge Frederic Block for lack of ripeness because the government stated that the new implementing regulations would not be finalized until August 1, 2013. On November 6, 2015 the Supreme Court of the United States decided it will review the case combined with 6 other similar challenges to the contraceptive mandate under the case name Zubik v. Burwell.

=== Saieg v. City of Dearborn ===
In 2009, Muise successfully challenged the city of Dearborn, Michigan's restriction on a Christian pastor's right to distribute religious literature to Muslims at the city's annual Arab International Festival. In May 2011, the 6th U.S. Circuit Court of Appeals said the restriction was unreasonable, and ruled that Dearborn and its police department "violated Saieg's First Amendment right to freedom of speech."

=== Catholic League et al. v. City of San Francisco ===
Muise filed a federal lawsuit against the City of San Francisco on behalf of the Catholic League and two Catholic citizens after the city passed an official resolution condemning the Catholic Church's teaching which opposed adoptions by homosexual couples. The resolution, adopted March 21, 2006, referred to the Vatican as a "foreign country" meddling in the affairs of the city and proclaimed the Church's moral teaching and beliefs on homosexuality as "insulting to all San Franciscans", "hateful", "insulting and callous", "defamatory", "absolutely unacceptable", "insensitive", and "ignorant". The resolution made reference to the Inquisition; and it urged the Archbishop of San Francisco and Catholic Charities of San Francisco to defy Church directives.

According to the lawsuit, the Establishment Clause of the Constitution does not permit government hostility toward religion. The lower court dismissed the case. Muise then appealed the ruling to the Ninth Circuit Court of Appeals, where a three-judge panel affirmed the lower court decision. A request for an en banc rehearing of the appeal by the entire panel of the Ninth Circuit Court was granted with the panel affirming the prior ruling in 2010. Muise petitioned the U.S. Supreme Court to review the case, but this request was denied.

=== Johnson v. Poway Unified School District ===
In 2007, Muise filed a federal lawsuit against a Southern California school district on behalf of math teacher Brad Johnson after he was ordered to remove several banners from his classroom because school officials claimed the banners promoted an impermissible "Judeo-Christian" viewpoint. The banners, which the teacher had been displaying for over 25 years without complaint, contained slogans such as "In God We Trust", "One Nation Under God", and the preamble to the Declaration of Independence. The school district filed a motion to dismiss; however, the federal judge denied the motion in a lengthy opinion, ruling in the math teacher's favor. Upon the completion of discovery, the parties filed cross-motions for summary judgment. The court granted summary judgment for the plaintiff; but the school district appealed the decision to the Ninth Circuit Court of Appeals. On May 5, 2011, Muise and the school district's attorney presented oral arguments to a three-judge panel on the Ninth Circuit. Due to the importance of the case, C-SPAN broadcast the oral arguments. On September 13, 2011, the Ninth Circuit Court of Appeals overturned the summary judgment and ruled that the school district did not violate Johnson's free speech rights. The unanimous decision of the federal appeals court relied on U.S. Supreme Court rulings that said governments can limit the free speech rights of public employees in the workplace. Nevertheless, Muise has appealed this decision to the U.S. Supreme Court.

=== Kevin Murray v. U.S. Treasury Sec. Timothy Geithner, et al. ===
In 2008, Muise, along with co-counsel David Yerushalmi, filed a federal lawsuit against the Department of Treasury and the Board of Governors of the Federal Reserve, challenging a portion of the Emergency Economic Stabilization Act of 2008 that appropriated $40 billion in taxpayer money to fund the federal government's majority ownership interest in AIG. The lawsuit claimed that the federal government, through its ownership of AIG, engages in Sharia-based Islamic religious activities. The lawsuit further claimed the use of taxpayer dollars to fund Shariah-based Islamic religious activities violated the Establishment Clause of the First Amendment. While federal Judge Lawrence P. Zatkoff, at the request by the Department of Justice, dismissed the lawsuit in 2009, he reached a summary judgment in January 2011, noting that the religious involvement did not achieve the "excessive entanglement" required under a precedential ruling. The case is currently on appeal.

=== Hansen v. Ann Arbor Public Schools ===
In 2002, Muise filed a civil rights lawsuit on behalf of former Ann Arbor, Michigan high school student, Betsy Hansen, and her mother against the Ann Arbor Public Schools and several of its administrators and faculty members at Pioneer High School. The lawsuit claimed that the school district's restricted Hansen's right to express her religious views during the school's "diversity week". According to the lawsuit, school officials claimed that Betsy's religious view toward homosexuality was a "negative" message and would "water-down" the "positive" religious message that they wanted to convey. In December 2003, Detroit Federal Judge Gerald Rosen ruled in the student's favor.

=== City of Dearborn v. David Wood, et al. ===
In 2010, four Christians evangelists were arrested on the first day of the annual three-day Dearborn International Arab Festival. The City charged them with breaching the peace and ordered them to stand trial. Following a five-day criminal trial in September 2010, all four were acquitted by a unanimous jury verdict.

=== Nieto v. Flatau ===
In 2008, Muise filed a lawsuit challenging a base traffic regulation that prohibits the display of "extremist, indecent, sexist, or racist messages" on motor vehicles at the Camp Lejeune, North Carolina Marine Corps base. His client, a retired combat Marine whose son was killed in the attack on the USS Cole, had displayed anti-Islam and anti-Muslim decals and signs on his vehicle and was cited by base officials who said that the decals and signs violated that regulation. The decals included a cartoon Calvin urinating on an illustration of the Prophet Mohammed, a US flag with the words "Disgrace My Countries [sic] Flag And I Will Shit On Your Quran", and "Islam = Terrorism". In April 2010, a federal judge ruled in the retired Marine's favor, saying the base regulation was not being enforced in a neutral manner and was therefore unconstitutional as applied to the Marine, and that the base cannot ban anti-Islamic decals while allowing decals that say "Islam is Love" or "Islam is Peace." "The fact that [the Marine's] message may be extremely offensive to some is not a sufficient basis for banning [his] decals. While the military may have greater leeway in restricting offensive material in furtherance of securing order and discipline among its troops, it may not do so in a manner that allows 'one message while prohibiting the messages of those who can reasonably be expected to respond,'" wrote the federal judge. The base's spokesman responded, "The ruling in no way limits or precludes the base commander from ensuring the maintenance of good order and discipline aboard the base," noting that the regulation itself was not deemed unconstitutional. The marine won the lawsuit, but says he was considered a "liability" by his employers and coworkers at the base, so he requested to be retired.
