= Status of women's testimony in Islam =

The status of women's testimony in Islam is disputed. Muslim societies' attitudes range from completely rejecting female testimony in certain legal areas, to conditionally accepting (half-worth that of a male, or with a requirement for supporting male testimony), to completely accepting it without any gender bias.

In Islamic law, testimony (shahada) is defined as attestation with regard to a right of a second party against a third. It exists alongside other forms of evidence (bayyina), such as the oath (yamin), acknowledgement (iqrar), and circumstantial evidence (qara'in al-ahwal). A testimony must involve certain knowledge of an affirmed event, and cannot be based on conjecture.

The following statement in the Quran is thought to be the general rule of testimony in Islamic jurisprudence, except for crime and punishment - for example, debt, shopping, etc.; O believers! When you contract a loan for a fixed period of time, commit it to writing....with justice. Call upon two of your men to witness. If two men cannot be found, then one man and two women of your choice will witness so if one of the women forgets the other may remind her.^{[Quran 4:11]}

As a different example, in the necklace story of Aisha, called Asbab al-Nuzul for surah An-Nur :11-20 four witnesses were required for the accusation of adultery. In addition, those who made accusations that did not meet the specified conditions would be punished with 80 lashes. The jurisprudence of later periods stipulates that witnesses must be men, covering all hadd crimes and people who did not have credibility and honesty in society (slaves, non-adl; sinners, infidels) could not testify against believers. The Islamic judiciary did not require proof of the issues defined as tazir.

== Financial documents ==
In case of witnesses for financial documents, the Qur'an asks for two men or one man and two women. This is interpreted by a number of Muslim scholars so as to imply testimony of two women being equal to a single man's. Tafsir Ibn Kathir states: "Allah requires that two women take the place of one man as witness, because of the woman's shortcomings, as the Prophet described [in a hadith]."

On the other hand, Javed Ahmed Ghamidi writes that Islam asks for two female witnesses against one male in the case of financial transactions as a means of relaxation of responsibility as it is not very suited to their temperament, sphere of interest, and usual environment. He argues that Islam makes no claim of a woman's testimony being half in any case. Ghamidi believes the context and wording of the verse includes no hint of a legal setting,^{(21:01)} the verse states: regarding contracts, witnesses be made in such a way; instead of the statement being: regarding contract disputes, witnesses of such type be called upon,^{(8:07)} similar to how it is stated in Quran 4:15.^{(19:18)} Therefore, Ghamidi interprets the Qur'an verse as only a recommendation directed towards individuals, and it will be for the court judge to decide what kind and whose evidence will be enough to prove a case.

Regarding the hadith, that is used to prove the half-testimony status, Ghamidi and members of his foundation, Al-Mawrid, argue against its reliability and its common understanding.^{(27:37)} Ghamidi also contends that the narration cannot be used in all general cases because it is related to the Qur'an verse whose subject is related only to financial matters. Another Pakistani religious scholar Ishaq argues that acquiring conclusive evidence is important, regardless of whether it can be obtained from just one man or just one woman.

According to Ghamidi, regarding the verse Ibn al-Qayyim and Ibn Taymiyya also held similar views to his.^{(11:31)} Al-Qayyim argued that the verse relates to the heavy responsibility of testifying by which an owner of wealth protects his rights, not with the decision of a court; the two are completely different from each other. It is also argued that this command shows that the Qur'an does not want to make difficulties for women. Ibn Taymiyya also reasoned the deficiency of using Qur'an 2:282 to prove evidentiary discrimination against women. However, both Ibn al-Qayyim and Ibn Taymiyya did believe in the difference of probative value of men's and women's testimony. It is argued that even though Ibn al-Qayyim believed that women were more prone to making errors, instead of concluding a general discrimination from this, women's testimony was to be treated on an individual basis. This is because Ibn al-Qayyim contended that in cases where a woman and man share all the Islamic good qualities of a witness, a woman's testimony corroborated by another woman may actually be considered stronger than the uncorroborated testimony of a man. Additionally, Ibn al-Qayyim also regarded the testimony of some exceptional women like those who transmitted the Hadith as doubtlessly greater than a single man of lesser esteem.

Ibn Taymiyya writes:

"فَمَا كَانَ مِنْ الشَّهَادَاتِ لَا يُخَافُ فِيهِ الضَّلَالُ فِي الْعَادَةِ لَمْ تَكُنْ فِيهِ عَلَى نِصْفِ رَجُلٍ" "Whatever there is among the testimonies of women, which there is no fear of habitual error, then they are not considered as half of a man."

Ibn al-Qayyim writes:

"وَالْمَرْأَةُ الْعَدْلُ كَالرَّجُلِ فِي الصِّدْقِ وَالْأَمَانَةِ وَالدِّيَانَة إلَّا أَنَّهَا لَمَّا خِيفَ عَلَيْهَا السَّهْوُ وَالنِّسْيَانُ قَوِيَتْ بِمِثْلِهَا وَذَلِكَ قَدْ يَجْعَلُهَا أَقْوَى مِنْ الرَّجُلِ الْوَاحِدِ أَوْ مِثْلَهُ" "The woman is equal to the man in honesty, trust, and piety; otherwise, whenever it is feared that she will forget or misremember, she is strengthened with another like herself. That makes them stronger than a single man or the likes of him."

== Criminal offences ==
As an extension to the limitation claimed in financial contracts, a significant number of conservative Muslim scholars also argue for discrimination against female testimonies in hadd and qisas cases too though not in tazir.

In cases of hudud, punishments for serious crimes, 12th century Maliki jurist Averroes wrote that jurists disagree about the status of women's testimony. According to Averroes, certain scholars said that in these cases a woman's testimony is unacceptable regardless of whether they testify alongside male witnesses. However, he writes that the school of thought known as the Zahiris believe that if two or more women testify alongside a male witness, then (as in cases regarding financial transactions, discussed above), their testimony is acceptable. Ghamidi rejects the extended implementation of Q2:282 on incidental occurrences, arguing that the verse is limited specifically only to the topic of contract witnesses.^{(15:37)} Furthermore, some hadith record the presence of only single female testimonies in the cases of one murder and the assassination of Caliph Uthman. Respectively, the acceptance of these testimonies resulted in the death penalty for the murderer and start of a campaign against the state.

According to classical interpretations which disallow female testimony in hudud cases, enforce the gender difference on the matter of deciding what punishment is to be delivered, and not on proving guilt. In this context, female testimony would be acceptable in order to prove the guilt of the defendant, however, in the absence of male testimony, the guilty party will be liable to only the taziri punishment, instead of the divinely ordained hadd punishment.^{(28:42)}

== Other cases ==
Ibn al-Qayyim comments on the verse as follows:

There is no doubt that the reason for a plurality [of women in the Qur’anic verse] is [only] in recording testimony. However, when a woman is intelligent and remembers and is trustworthy in her religion, then the purpose [of testimony] is attained through her statement just as it is in her transmissions [in] religious [contexts].

In matters other than financial transactions, scholars differ on whether the Qur'anic verses relating to financial transactions apply. This is especially true in the case of bodily affairs like divorce, marriage, slave-emancipation and raju‘ (restitution of conjugal rights). According to Averroes, Imam Abu Hanifa believed that their testimony is acceptable in such cases. Imam Malik, on the contrary, believes that their testimony remains unacceptable. For bodily affairs about which men can have no information in ordinary circumstances, such as the physical handicaps of women and the crying of a baby at birth, the majority of scholars hold that the testimony of women alone is acceptable. In certain situations, the scripture accepts the testimony of a woman as equal to that of a man's and that her testimony can even invalidate his, such as when a man accuses his wife of unchastity.

When it came to legal testimony that was relegated to the private domain (e.g., birth), the testimony of one woman was equal to, and often more worthy than, the testimony of one man since there was no doubt that a woman was more experienced in that arena. Ibn Qudamah (d. 620 H), in his most famous compendium on Islamic jurisprudence al-Mughnī, explained that in matters of nursing, childbirth, menstruation, chastity, and physical defects, a male witness is not accepted entirely while a single female witness is. Not all scholars, however, insisted on the political and normative dichotomy, nor the public versus private realms. Hanbalite scholars Ibn Taymiyyah and Ibn al-Qayyim rejected these categorizations and argued that if either (testimony or narration) were to be more important, narrating a hadith would require more care because it deals with the words and actions of the Prophet.

== Classical commentators ==
Classical commentators commonly explained the unequal treatment of testimony by asserting that women's nature made them more prone to error than men. Muslim modernists have followed the Egyptian reformer Muhammad Abduh in viewing the relevant scriptural passages as conditioned on the different gender roles and life experiences that prevailed at the time rather than women's innately inferior mental capacities, making the rule not generally applicable in all times and places.

== Legal status ==
Does a woman's testimony carry the same evidentiary weight in court as a man's, OurWorldInData

Based mostly on a 2011 UNICEF report, partial list of countries where a woman's testimony is worth half that of a man:

- Bahrain (in Sharia courts for hadd and qisas)
- Egypt (in family courts except for divorce)
- Iran (in most cases except tazir)
- Iraq (in some cases)
- Jordan (in Sharia courts for marriage)
- Kuwait (in family courts)
- Libya (in some cases)
- Morocco (in family cases though not for divorce)
- Palestine (in cases related to marriage, divorce and child custody)
- Qatar (family law matters: in some cases, half, and in hadd, unacceptable)
- Saudi Arabia
- Syria (in some cases)
- United Arab Emirates (in criminal matters and in some civil matters)
- Yemen (in some cases, half, and in cases of hadd and qisas, unacceptable)

Organization of Islamic Cooperation (OIC) countries where women's testimony is known to be equal to a man's in all cases:

- Algeria
- Tunisia
- Oman

List is incomplete

=== Details ===
Tunisian and Turkish laws give equal treatment to women in matters of testimony.

== See also ==
- Application of sharia law by country
- Verse of Loan
- Women in Islam
- Hermeneutics of feminism in Islam
- Convention on the Elimination of All Forms of Discrimination Against Women
- Women related laws in Pakistan § Law of Evidence
- Islamic inheritance jurisprudence § Women and inheritance

== Bibliography ==
- Fadel, Mohammad. “Two Women, One Man: Knowledge, Power, and Gender in Medieval Sunni Legal Thought.” International Journal of Middle East Studies, vol. 29, no. 2, 1997, pp. 185–204., doi:10.1017/S0020743800064461.
