= Armin Mizani =

Puerto Rican-born American politician

Member-elect of the Texas House of Representatives from the 98th district
- Assuming office January 2027
- Succeeding: Giovanni Capriglione

Personal details
- Born: 1987 or 1988 (age 38–39) Puerto Rico
- Party: Republican
- Education: Purdue University (BA); Michigan State University College of Law (JD)

Armin Mizani (born 1987/1988) is a Puerto Rican-born American personal injury lawyer and politician. A member of the Republican Party, he is the member-elect for the 98th district of the Texas House of Representatives. He was elected mayor of Keller, Texas, in 2020.

== Background ==
Mizani was born in Puerto Rico, where he lived until he was 9-years old, to an Iranian father and Cuban mother. He earned a Bachelor of Arts from Purdue University and a Juris Doctor from Michigan State University College of Law. Mizani then founded a personal injury law firm.

== Political career ==
Mizani served on the city council of Keller, Texas, from 2014 to 2018 before being elected mayor of the city in 2020. He first ran for the 98th district of the Texas House of Representatives in 2018, challenging incumbent Giovanni Capriglione with support from conservative groups Texas Right to Life and Empower Texans. Mizani lost to Capriglione in the Republican primary election.

He supported Donald Trump in the 2024 presidential election and, following an anti-Puerto Rico joke by comedian Tony Hinchcliffe during a campaign rally, affirmed his support for Trump over cost of living issues.
