= Islamic Sharia Council =

British Islamic legal organisation

- Formation: 1982
- Registration no.: 1003855
- Purpose: Provision of advice on Islamic principles and law.
- Headquarters: Leyton, London
- Region served: UK
- Website: islamic-sharia.org

The Islamic Sharia Council (ISC) is a British organisation that provides Islamic legal rulings and advice to Muslims in accordance with its interpretation of Islamic Sharia based on the four Sunni schools of thought. It has no legal authority and its rulings are considered unofficial. It primarily handles cases of marriage and divorce and, to a lesser extent, business and finance. Thousands of Muslims have turned to the Council to resolve family and financial issues. The Economist magazine states it has offered rulings to "thousands of troubled families since the 1980s", the council states that it has dealt with an average of between 200 and 300 cases monthly as of January 2012.

The council has no legal authority in the United Kingdom, and cannot enforce any penalties; many Muslims would appear voluntarily to accept the rulings made by the ISC.

The Islamic Sharia Council says it is "devoted to the articulation of classical Islamic principles in a manner that provides a platform for Islam to be the cure of all humanity's ills." According to The Economist magazine its "two main founders come from purist schools of Islam, the Deobandis and the Salafis". A rival service, the Muslim Arbitration Tribunal, was founded in 2007 by followers of the Barelvi school of South Asian Islam, is reportedly "less strict than the Deobandis" and as of 2010 offered dispute resolution in half a dozen British cities.

== Criticism and defence ==
Humera Khan, co-founder of the An-Nisa Society, has said that Sharia councils provide an essential service for many Muslims who see Sharia as a sacred reference, and if used voluntarily, may actually lift a burden off state funded services. Lawyer and rabbi Alex Goldberg has also said that banning them would be "counterproductive", as it would "bolster underground councils rather than those who are seeking to work within the English legal framework, and recognise they are subservient to the English law."

In an April 2013 report, the BBC's Panorama asked whether the Islamic Sharia Council was "failing vulnerable women and mothers" by requiring women seeking divorce to give back their marriage dowry (or mahr). The question of khula divorce often turns on the dower: if the woman is seeking the divorce, she has to return the dower to the man, or else the divorce cannot proceed. Since in traditional Islamic society, men are traditionally the bank account holders and women are traditionally homemakers, the woman has no purchase, and cannot obtain a loan in order to repay the dower to receive an Islamically recognized divorce. The Islamic Sharia Council must recognise a British divorce, by virtue of the law of the land, if the petitioner shows them a decree absolute. However, the Islamic Sharia Council is displeased if the dower remains unpaid.

Writer, broadcaster and academic Myriam Francois-Cerrah has pointed to "serious problems" with the councils, citing a case in which a Muslim woman seeking advice was reportedly directed to a "controversial cleric" who urged her to give up her custody dispute with her husband and "hand over full custody of her seven year old child" to him despite the fact that the husband was a "violent schizophrenic" who had abused her for years.

== See also ==
- Islam in the United Kingdom
