= Takhayyur =

Islamic legal doctrine

Takhayyur is an Islamic legal doctrine that allows adherents of one of four Sunni schools of law to select the ruling of another when the latter is more convenient. The doctrine seeks legitimacy through Quranic verses and prophetic traditions, arguing the Quran and Sunnah both emphasize ease and convenience in religious practice. This doctrine has been invoked in the modern world to introduce legislative reforms of Islamic laws, particularly Islamic family laws, in many Muslim countries.

== Etymology ==
Takhayyur is derived from the Arabic root for "selecting".

== Background ==
According to Shawkani, a well-known Muslim scholar, the notion of adhering to a single school emerged after the time of the four major imams. In their day, there was no sense of rigorous devotion to a particular school. Following the deaths of major imams in the middle of the Hijri third century, the notion of adhering to a particular school of thought emerged. Shah Wali Ullah states in his work Hujjat Allah Al-Balighah that there was no unanimity on taqlid of one specific school prior to the fourth century. It was common procedure to approach any jurist, regardless of his affiliation, to resolve any issues that arose. During the rule of the Abbasids, judges did not believe themselves compelled to follow a specific mujtahid or school of thought, but instead followed their own.

== Basis in the Quran and the Sunnah ==
Three verses from the Quran are cited in support of takhayyur: "God intends for you ease and does not intend hardship for you" (Baqarah, 2:185) "God does wish to lighten your (difficulties); for man was created weak" (Nisa’, 4:28) "He has (not meant) to impose hardship in religion on you" (Hajj, 22:78). Muslim jurists refer to a hadith in which the prophet said, “I have been sent to [facilitate] tolerance and easiness.” ‘Aishah, the widow of the Prophet, stated that “the Prophet did not choose but the easier of the two options so long as it did not amount to transgression.” Likewise, when the Prophet sent Mu'adh b. Jabal and Abu Musa al-Ash'ari to Yemen as judges, he told them to “Make things easy for people and do not make them difficult. Give them glad tidings and do not drive them away.”

== Historical development ==
Takhayyur has its roots in "scholastic plurality and differentiation". The term was used in premodern legal discourse to describe a situation in which there was a conflict of evidence for the mujtahid or contradicting solutions presented to the muqallid. If there is no differentiating evidence supporting one over the other, the mujtahid and muqallid may choose between the two legal positions.

In pre-modern times, Muslim Jurists employed takhayyur as a last resort when tarji failed to provide a preference for one legal opinion. Premodern Islamic legal theories generally recognized the selection of legal positions based on evidence. Pragmatic selection, on the other hand, has long been a source of contention. It is not, however, a new idea. In answer to a question concerning whether takhayyur was purely a product of modernity, Fekry Ibrahim stated that pragmatic selection was "hardly novel". He argued that it was practiced throughout Islamic history.

Taqi al-Din al-Subki, a Shafi scholar, advocated for a middle ground approach between the opposing sides of the argument, allowing pragmatic selection in specific circumstances. Many premodern Shafi thinkers echoed al-Subki's views, but Ottoman jurists pushed these boundaries on the pragmatic selection of juristic opinions.

Takhayyur gained prominence in the modern world. In modern Islamic legal discourse, it "came to refer to the eclectic selection of opinions", inside and outside of a certain school of thought that aims to adapt to the changing realities of modern Muslim societies. This new approach of "crossing madhab lines" has defined the work of prominent Sunni scholars such as Mohammed al-Ghazali, Yusuf al-Qaradawi, and Ali Gomaa.

== Concept ==
Takhayyur means to choose between different schools of thought on various subjects. The approach is predicated on the idea of not adhering to a particular school of law. Proponents of this doctrine argue that a Muslim is obligated to follow Islam, not a certain interpretation of Islam. According to Ibn al-Qayyim, a Hanbali jurist, nothing is compulsory on a Muslim save what the Qur'an and Sunnah have mandated. Muslim jurists have long maintained that a Muslim has the right to attend any school of his or her choosing. Noel J. Coulson stated Ibn Taimiyah's position that obedience to any authority other than the Prophet Muhammad was not required. Ibn Taimiyah thought it was legitimate for a Muslim to follow diverse scholars and said that scholars such as Abu Hanifah, Malik, Shafi, and Amad ibn Hanbal did not dispute a Muslim's freedom to do so. Isnawi cited Al-Amidi's position that it is permissible to follow different schools in order to solve different problems.

The notion of takhayyur offers an individual Muslim the right to consult any other school of thought than his own in a given topic. According to this notion, variety of thought in Islamic law is regarded a wealth and an advantage in finding more suitable solutions. Takhayyur allows practitioners of any of the four Sunni schools to choose the ruling of another when the other ruling is more convenient. It is also applicable within the same school of thought when an individual chooses a minority opinion that is available within his or her own school of thought. It is conceivable because scholars within the same school frequently provide alternative interpretations or overturn a previous ruling when it becomes outmoded for a variety of reasons.

Takhayyur is permitted on the premise that all four major schools of thought have recognized each other as legitimate interpretations of Islam, despite concerns voiced by certain commentators about the 'opportunism' or 'forum shopping' that such eclecticism may entail. This is compounded by the reality that the major legal schools tend to agree on the fundamentals but vary primarily on the details of their interpretations and ijtihad. Since the Qur'an and hadith provide strong support for ease and convenience in religious practice, people have a certain degree of freedom in choosing from a variety of legal positions. Jurists are also encouraged to choose simpler positions wherever possible and avoid causing misery to people, without sacrificing core principles.

Proponents of takhayyur argue that when a state seeks to amend the legislation, it must not adhere to a certain school of thought. Since different points of view are considered equally valid, they should be utilised to solve current problems. They argue that strong attachment to a particular school may lead to a Muslim's refusal to consult a scholar from any other school, as well as a prejudice toward other schools and their scholars. It may lead to a preference for an imam's opinion, even if it is contrary to Sunna.

=== Conditions ===
The practice of employing the doctrine of takhayyur is not without restrictions. Many Muslim jurists have specified the conditions for applying this doctrine. According to Taqi al-Din al-Subki, the three valid reasons for exercising Takhayyur are: (a) when the individual perceives that the other school's viewpoint is more accurate, (b) when the individual is of the opinion that his imam is more correct or when he has no opinion but changes schools as a pious precaution, and (c) when relaxation of the regulations is required due to a need or necessity. On the other hand, unacceptable reasons for him include: (a) changing schools without a need or requirement, (b) following one's whims on a regular basis, therefore constructing one's own religious law from rukhsas, and (c) changing schools if that leads to a legal complication. Shihab al-Din al-Qarafi allowed Takhayyur under three conditions: the opinions should not be combined in a way that contradicts consensus or creates an opinion that no jurist has expressed; the jurist is trustworthy; and the specific opinion sought is not sought in order to get rukhsah (concessions).

For Muslim jurists, Takhayyur, therefore is an effective legal instrument which can be utilized in the development of effective solutions to fulfill people's needs and for the pursuit of acceptable benefits (maslahah). It cannot, however, be used as an instrument for distortion and deviation from fundamental principles.

== Applications ==
Takhayyur was applied in Ottoman civil code (1869−76 AD) to choose the most suitable opinions within the Hanafi school for the Ottoman Empire in the nineteenth century. It was also used in the drafting of the Islamic law of personal status in countries such as Egypt, where jurists relied on a long legacy of Sunni law and, in certain cases, non-Sunni schools to meet the demands of modern Islamic nation states.

The doctrine was employed in a number of legislative reforms relating to Islamic family law and inheritance in the twentieth century. For example, some non-Hanafi Middle Eastern and Asian countries have embraced the Hanafi legal position that allows an adult girl to arrange her own marriage even if her guardian (wali) is not present, although most other schools require the guardian's approval. Another example is the legalization of judicial separation or divorce grounded on prejudice/darar, which the Maliki law recognizes while the other schools do not, or do so with various constraints. As a result, several non-Maliki countries have incorporated the Maliki law of divorce into their family laws.

== Related notions ==
A notion similar to Takhayyur is talfiq, which literally translates "to sew together" two pieces of fabric. In talfiq, the jurist combines elements of one school of thought or scholar's viewpoint with those of another to attain a certain outcome. Although none of these segmental points of view would separately legitimize the final outcome, when they are combined, they form a new rule. It occurs when the two or more convenient opinions are combined in the same transaction. One example of talfiq would be the marriage agreement by a lady without the consent of her guardian (wali) or the presence of two witnesses. Talfiq would approve this marriage by way of combining the Mliki viewpoint (which renders a marriage contract legal even without witnesses) with the Hanafi viewpoint (which allows an adult to contract a marriage contract without a guardian).

Takhayyur is also connected to two other similar expressions: tatabbu' al-rukhas (seeking concessions) and tarjih (preference). The former relates to crossing school borders in quest of concessions, whereas tarjih (equivalent to takhayyur) allows for the choosing of one position among many alternatives, usually for expediency and convenience, and occasionally for flexibility to changing circumstances.

== Sources ==
- Kamali, M.H. (2021). "Selection (Takhayyur, also Takhyir)". Shariah and the Halal Industry. Oxford University Press. ISBN 978-0-19-753861-6.
- Sabreen, Mudasra (2017). "Takhayyur – A Reform Methodology for Pakistan". Hamdard Islamicus. 40 (3): 51–65.
