= Texas Bullion Depository =

Fortified vault building in Texas

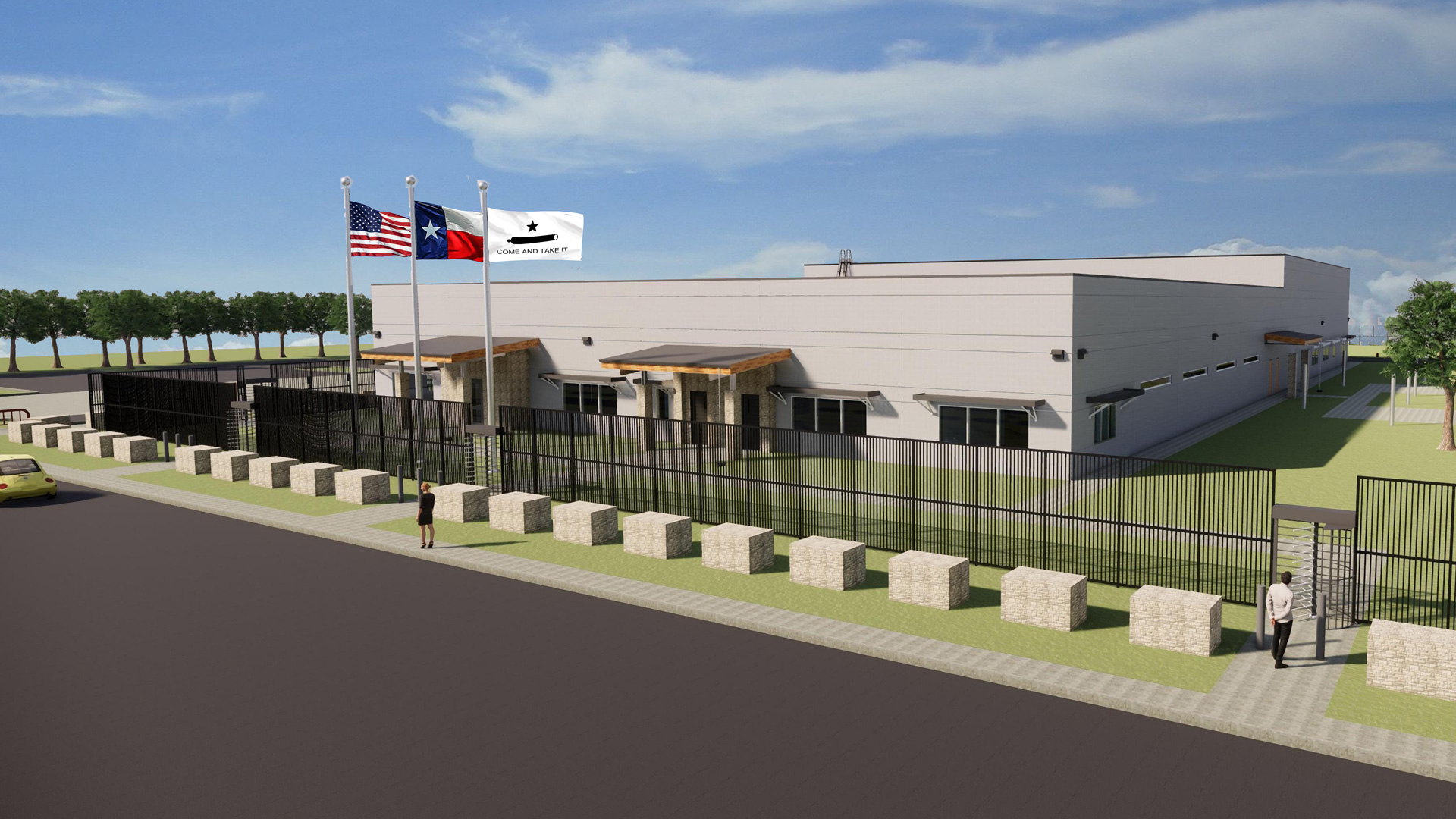
Texas Bullion Depository rendering.

The Texas Bullion Depository is a bullion depository based in Texas in the United States. It was the first state-administered depository to be established in the United States; previous depositories were either at federal level or private companies. Texas Comptroller Glenn Hegar announced it was open for business on June 6, 2018.

In 2017, the Comptroller’s office partnered with Lone Star Tangible Assets (LSTA) as the vendor to build and operate the depository. LSTA, a Texas-based company that also owns precious metals dealers U.S. Gold Bureau and WholesaleCoinsDirect.com, operates a highest-rated, Class 3 vault that serves as the depository’s initial location.

Planning for a permanent home for the Texas Bullion Depository began in 2018, at a site in Leander, Texas that should be completed in 2019. Tom Smelker, director of Comptroller Treasury Operations, was named administrator of the depository in 2017.

The depository eliminates the need for out-of-state storage and gives Texas the opportunity to become a “commodities hub for the continent,” according to Rep. Giovanni Capriglione, R-Southlake. Free from the jurisdiction of governmental or quasi-governmental authority beyond the state of Texas, the depository offers a safe storage facility for the bullion of both institutions and individuals and creates a more stable Texas economy.

The depository accepts deposits of gold, silver, platinum, palladium and rhodium.

== History ==
Texas Governor Greg Abbott signed the Texas Bullion Depository Bill, HB 483, on June 19, 2015. Rep. Giovanni Capriglione, R-Southlake, originally filed the bill on December 10, 2014. The bill was co-authored by 31 other colleagues and sponsored by Sen. Lois Kolkhorst, R-Brenham. In 2013 Capriglione announced his interest in creating the depository and was subsequently contacted by people around the world interested in storing their gold in a Texas depository. Capriglione was able to draw support for the depository by requiring that it be run by the private sector with no costs to taxpayers. The bullion depository will hold precious metals deposits owned by multiple entities: individuals, businesses, financial institutions and even foreign countries.

Texas Comptroller Glenn Hegar issued a request for information, RFI 212P, regarding the location of the depository. Many companies replied, including Texas Precious Metals, Brink's and Anthem Vault. All three companies envision different solutions for the storage of the precious metals. Tarek Saab, chief operating officer of Texas Precious Metals, proposed building a $20 million depository on 40-acres in Shiner, Texas, without the cost of taxpayer dollars. Brink's is in favor of relocating the state's’ precious metals to one of their branch locations instead of constructing a physical building. Anthem Vault addressed the issue of location by offering the implementation of multiple locations for the depository, including retail storefronts and coin shops across the state. Hegar worked through business models with his task force to ensure Texas has a safe and secure depository.

The June 2017 announcement of Lone Star Tangible Assets as the partnering vendor concluded a lengthy evaluation period and followed the announcement that Tom Smelker, the director of Treasury Operations at the Comptroller's office, was named the depository administrator.

== Legislation ==
Texas HB 483 authorizes the establishment and administration of a state bullion depository to serve as the custodian, guardian and administrator of bullion that may be transferred to or otherwise acquired by this state or an agency, political subdivision, or another instrumentality of the state. The bill grants the Comptroller authority to interpret and implement the Act and allows the Texas Bullion Depository to "purchase" and "sell" precious metals in the "course of ordinary business" (Sec. 151.003). The bill states that the Texas Bullion Depository should be a monument to the state of Texas, a recruitment attraction for business, and an asset for domestic and international relations.

== Challenges and reactions ==
Although there has been both public and private support behind the bill –– which passed nearly unanimously with only one "nay" vote –– some disagree that the bill should have been passed, claiming that any depository concept doesn't make financial sense for taxpayers, and that gold is not a practical investment for the state.

The University of Texas Investment Management Company (UTIMCO) has gold bullion stored in New York, worth $647 million. According to Lois Kolkhorst, HSBC Bank in New York City charges Texas a fee to store each individual bar of gold. HB 483 does not require UTIMCO to move the $647 million in precious metals back to Texas. New York City is within the COMEX trading market. Currently, all COMEX rated facilities are located within 150 miles of New York City and earning a COMEX membership out of this region may be difficult.

== See also ==
- United States Bullion Depository
- Federal Reserve Bank of New York Building
- Gold as an investment
- Vaulted gold
