= Islamic Penal Code of Iran =

National criminal code of Iran

The Islamic Penal Code of Iran is the codified national criminal law of Iran. The current Islamic Penal Code was enacted in 2012 and entered into force in 2013. The 2013 code replaced the first Islamic Penal Code, which was enacted in 1991. The 1991 code attempted to codify Iran's criminal law on the basis of Islamic Sharia as interpreted by the Shia based Jaafari school of Islamic jurisprudence.

After the election of the first Majles of the Islamic Republic in 1980, the Majles and the Guardian Council quickly codified important features of the sharia law by passing two landmark bills in July 1982: Sharia law includes Hudud ("claims against God", punishable by a mandatory, fixed sentence), Qisas (the law of retaliation/retribution), diyyeh, or blood money (to compensate for the death/injury), Qanon-e Ta'zir (tazir is a crime that receives a discretionary sentence by a judge), Qanon-e Qisas (Retribution Law).

Compared to the 1991 code, the 2013 code has been described as containing improved provisions for the rehabilitation of offenders, although still falling short in this area. Other reforms in the 2013 code included strengthened provisions on the reduction of sentences of minors on the basis of their immaturity.

== Same-sex sexual activity ==
Article 233 of the 2013 version of the Islamic Penal Code of Iran defines sodomy (lavāt) as the "penetration of genital organ up to foreskin of a man into anus of a male human". Under article 234, the receptive partner receives the death penalty; the insertive partner receives the death penalty if they used force or coercion, are married, or if they are non-Muslim and the receptive partner is Muslim; otherwise, the penalty for the insertive partner is one hundred lashes. Article 235 punishes intercrural sex between men with one hundred lashes; a man placing his penis between a man's buttocks without inserting it into the rectum is also classified under article 235. However, under article 235, if the active partner is non-Muslim and the passive partner is non-Muslim, the penalty is execution. Article 237 criminalises all other physically intimate acts between men, with a punishment of between thirty-one and seventy-four lashes, chosen by judicial discretion. Under article 114, if the offender repents of a capital crime prior to conviction, and the judge considers the repentance to be genuine, then the penalty may be reduced to flogging, imprisonment, or even a reprimand; if the offender repents after conviction, the judge may submit a request to the Supreme Leader for the offender to be pardoned.

Under articles 238 and 239 of the 2013 Islamic Penal Code, the punishment for tribadism (female-female genital contact) is one hundred lashes. Under article 136, a woman convicted of tribadism for a fourth time receives the death penalty. The 2013 Penal Code does not contain any explicit provision criminalizing other cases of female-female sexual contact.
