= Muslim Arbitration Tribunal =

Provider of Islamic arbitration in the United Kingdom

- Formation: 2007
- Purpose: to provide a viable alternative for the Muslim community seeking to resolve disputes in accordance with Islamic Law.
- Headquarters: Hijaz Manor, Watling Street, Nuneaton, CV11 6BE
- Region served: UK
- Leader: Faiz-ul-Aqtab Siddiqi
- Website: www.matribunal.com

The Muslim Arbitration Tribunal is a form of alternative dispute resolution which operates under the Arbitration Act 1996 which is available in England as a Barelvi organization. It is one of a range of services (Islamic Sharia Council is another) for Muslims who wish to resolve disputes without recourse to the courts system. According to Machteld Zee, the MAT differs from other Sharia councils in that their ‘core business’ is arbitrating commercial disputes under the Arbitration Act 1996.

The tribunals were set up by lawyer Faiz-ul-Aqtab Siddiqi and operate in London, Bradford, Manchester, Birmingham and Nuneaton. Two more were originally planned for Glasgow and Edinburgh. Rulings can be enforced in England and Wales by both the County Courts and the High Court. The media have described a system of Islamic Sharia courts which have the power to rule in civil cases. As of 2008, the courts had dealt with around 100 cases dealing with issues such as inheritance and nuisance neighbours.

== Legality and powers ==
The MAT operates under Section 1 of the Arbitration Act which states that: “the parties should be free to agree how their disputes are resolved, subject only to such safeguards as are necessary in the public interest”. As such it operates within the framework of English law and does not constitute a separate Islamic legal system. Under the Act they are deemed to be "arbitration tribunals".

The Muslim Arbitration Tribunal has no powers to grant a divorce which is valid in English and Welsh law. A talaq can be granted to recognise divorce. A sharia marriage has no bearing on personal status under UK law. The Muslim Arbitration Tribunal has no jurisdiction on criminal matters but can attempt reconciliation between spouses.

== Criticism and controversy ==
Former MP Dominic Grieve has stated: “If it is true that these tribunals are passing binding decisions in the areas of family and criminal law, I would like to know which courts are enforcing them because I would consider such action unlawful. British law is absolute and must remain so."

An e-petition to the UK government to prohibit and criminalise sharia courts received over 15,000 signatures. The government issued a response, stating that sharia rulings are only permitted if legal under UK law.

== See also ==
- Islamic Sharia Council
- Islamic law
- English and Welsh law
