= Texas's 98th House of Representatives district =

Electoral district of Texas

Texas's 98th State House of Representatives district
Representative
Giovanni Capriglione; R–Southlake

District 98 is a district in the Texas House of Representatives. It has been represented by Republican Giovanni Capriglione since 2013.

== Geography ==
The district contains parts of Tarrant County.

== Members ==
- Vicki Truitt (1999–2013)
- Giovanni Capriglione (since 2013)
