= Crystal Clear =

Crystal Clear may refer to:

== Music and film ==
- Crystal Clear (Jaci Velasquez album), 2000
- Crystal Clear (David Dunn album), 2015
  - Crystal Clear (EP), a 2014 EP by David Dunn
- "Crystal Clear", a 1988 song from World Without End by the Mighty Lemon Drops
- "Crystal Clear", a 1993 song from Evolver by The Grid.
- "Crystal Clear", a 2003 song from Gallowsbird's Bark by The Fiery Furnaces
- "Crystal Clear", a 2010 song from All Our Kings Are Dead by Young Guns
- Crystal Clear, a 2000 short film by and with Jonathan Jackson
- CLC (band), a South Korean girl group also known as CrystaL Clear

== Other uses ==
- Crystal Clear (company), a Philippine brand of purified water
- Crystal Clear, a computer icon set for Linux KDE
