= Jonathan Stickland =

American politician (born 1983)

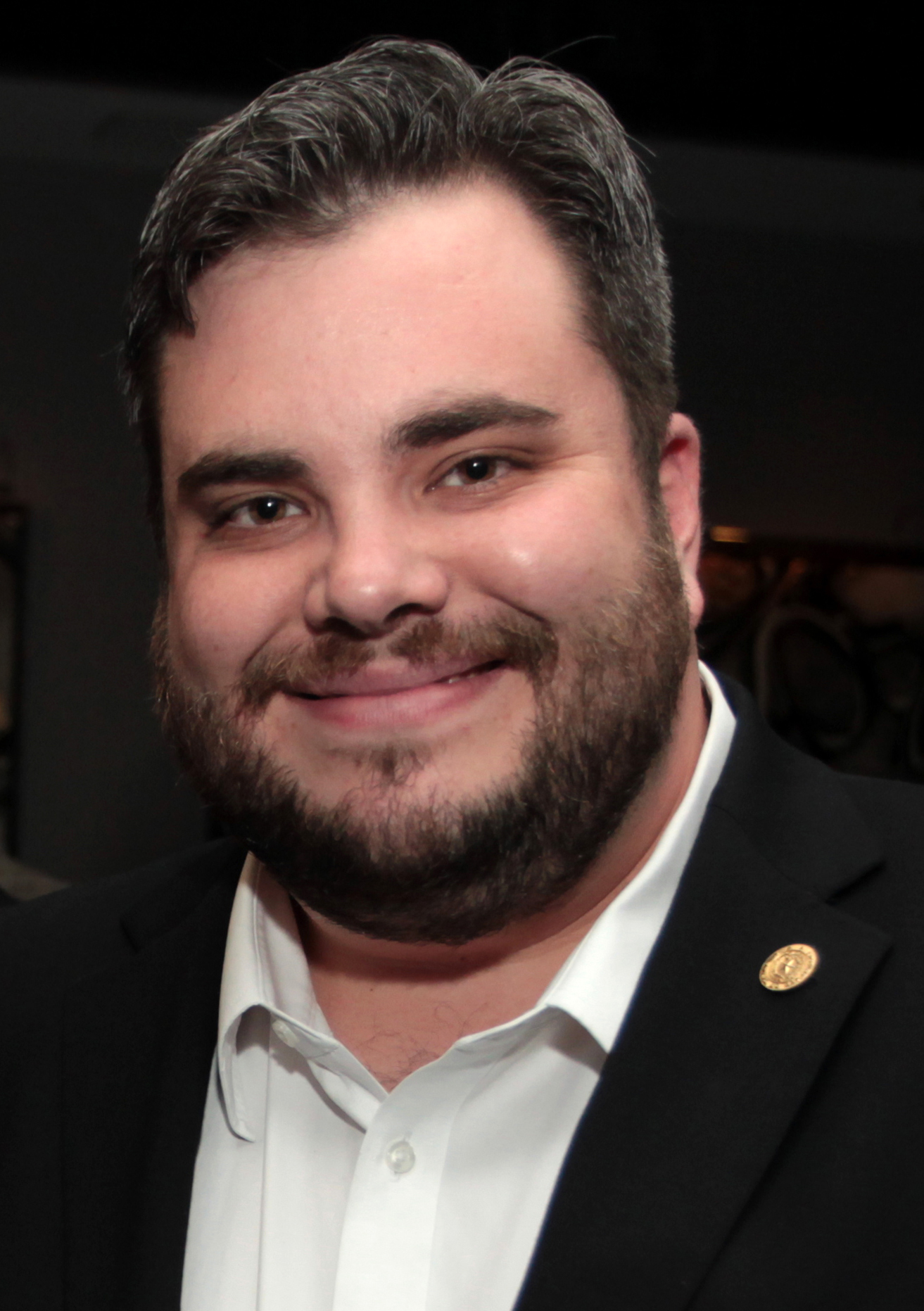

Member of the Texas House of Representatives from the 92nd district
- In office January 8, 2013 – January 12, 2021
- Preceded by: Todd Smith
- Succeeded by: Jeff Cason

Personal details
- Born: Jonathan Spence Stickland; September 4, 1983 (age 43) Plano, Texas, U.S.
- Party: Republican
- Spouse: Krissy Stickland (m. 2006)
- Children: 2
- Education: Tarrant County College; Parkland College

Jonathan Spence Stickland (born September 4, 1983) is an American politician from Texas. A member of the Republican Party, he was a member of the Texas House of Representatives from District 92 for four terms, from 2013 to 2021. The district includes a portion of Tarrant County in suburban Fort Worth. He did not seek re-election in 2020.

== Texas House of Representatives ==
=== Elections ===
When the incumbent Republican Representative Todd Smith did not seek reelection in 2012, Stickland defeated Roger Fisher, 6,332 votes (60.2 percent) to 4,190 (39.8 percent) in the Republican primary election held on May 29, 2012. In the general election on November 6, 2012, in conjunction with the U.S. presidential race, Stickland faced no Democratic opponent and defeated the Libertarian Party nominee, Sean D. Fatzinger of Fort Worth, 37,084 votes (80.7 percent) to 8,884 (19.3 percent).

In the Republican primary election held on March 4, 2014, Stickland defeated challenger Andy Cargile, a retired principal and school district trustee, earning 7,612 votes (65 percent) to Cargile's 4,102 votes (35 percent).

In 2015, the political newsletter Quorum Report published online posts on a fantasy sports forum made by Stickland in 2001 and 2008 given to them by his Republican primary opponent, Scott Fisher. In a 2008 post, Stickland condoned marital rape (in response to another user's request for advice on sex, Stickland wrote: "Rape is non existent in marriage, take what you want my friend!"); in other posts, Stickland referred to his marijuana use (in 2001, Stickland sought a "smoking buddy"; in 2002 he asked for advice on how to grow marijuana; in 2008, he asked for advice on how to pass an employer's drug test). The comments became an issue during Stickland's 2016 campaign for reelection to the state House. Stickland apologized for his remarks; he said in college "I wasted much of life, said and did things I wish I hadn't" and that "by the Grace of God my past sins are forgiven."

In the Republican primary on March 1, 2016, Stickland faced opposition in his bid for a third term from Scott Weston Fisher, the senior pastor since 2000 of the Metroplex Chapel in Euless, Texas. Fisher carried the backing of former Governor Rick Perry, who in 2008 appointed Fisher to the Texas Youth Commission. Stickland defeated Fisher in the primary election with 58% of the vote.

Stickland retained his state House seat in the November 2018 general election, by a narrow margin. With 29,755 votes (49.82 percent), he defeated his Democratic opponent, Steve Riddell, who polled 28,327 votes (47.43 percent); Libertarian Party nominee Eric P. Espinoza, received 1,644 votes (2.75 percent).

=== Committees ===
For all of his four terms in the state House, Stickland was a member of the County Affairs Committee. He was also a member of the Special Purpose Districts Committee in the 83rd (2013) and 84th sessions (2015) sessions. He was a member of the Business and Industry Committee in the 85th session (2017) and a member of the Land and Resource Management Committee in the 86th session.

=== Legislation and positions ===
An anti-abortion legislator, Stickland supported in 2013 the ban on abortion after twenty weeks of gestation; the measure passed the House, 96–49. He co-sponsored companion legislation to increase medical and licensing requirements of abortion providers, a law that the opponents claim could shut down many abortion clinics. These issues instigated a filibuster in the Texas State Senate by Wendy R. Davis of Fort Worth. The Texas Right to Life Committee rated Stickland 78 percent favorable, presenting him with a "Former Fetus" wall plaque which was briefly displayed on the wall outside Stickland's office at the Capitol building.

Stickland voted against the legislation to establish a taxpayer-funded breakfast program for public schools; the measure passed the House, 73–58. He co-sponsored legislation to provide marshals for school security as a separate law-enforcement entity. He voted for the extension of the franchise tax exemption to certain businesses, which passed the House 117–24. He voted against the adoption of the biennial 2013 state budget. He voted to require testing for narcotics of those individuals receiving unemployment compensation. Stickland voted against a bill relating to unlawful employment practices regarding discrimination in payment of compensation, which nevertheless passed the House, 78–61.

Stickland co-sponsored the measure to forbid the state from engaging in the enforcement of federal regulations of firearms. He also co-sponsored legislation to permit college and university officials to carry concealed weapons. He voted to reduce the time required to obtain a concealed-carry permit in Texas. He backed the redistricting bills for the state House and Senate and the United States House of Representatives. Stickland voted for term limits for certain state officials. He voted for legislation to forbid one individual from turning in multiple ballots.

In 2017, Stickland offered an unsuccessful amendment to prohibit state aid to the abatement of feral hogs. In retaliation for Stickland's amendment, his Republican colleague, Drew Springer, Jr., of Muenster, backed by Speaker Joe Straus of San Antonio, obtained passage of another amendment to defund $900,000 from the Texas Department of Transportation earmarked for Stickland's hometown of Bedford.

Stickland was one of the most prominent Republican state House members who designated themselves the "Freedom Caucus" (a right-wing grouping aligned with the Tea Party movement). The group was founded at the beginning of the 2017 session. In May 2017, along with fellow caucus members, he engaged in an effort to block legislative priorities of House speaker Joe Straus through parliamentary obstruction tactics; the group used a legislative procedure called "chubbing" to kill more than 100 bills on the House calendar, in what became known as the "Mother's Day Massacre." Stickland resigned from the Freedom Caucus in 2019.

Stickland in 2017 authored HB375 which would allow Texans who were legally able to own firearms to openly carry handguns without a permit from the state of Texas.

Stickland is one of only twelve House Republicans organized through the House Freedom Caucus, which he claims is the true representative of most conservative Republicans statewide. He has emerged as a critic of Speaker Joe Straus and an ally in the House of Lieutenant Governor Dan Patrick, the presiding officer of the Texas State Senate. In 2017, Patrick and Straus quarreled over the bathroom bill sponsored by State Senator Lois Kolkhorst of Brenham, which would require persons to use the public rest room corresponding with their genitalia at birth. Straus agreed to a more moderate bill because of what he called concerns about economic boycotts of Texas by business and athletic groups who view the bathroom legislation as infringing on the rights of transgender persons. The Patrick-Straus split created an impasse on the legislation as the regular session wound down. Stickland said, "I absolutely think that there is a fight going on for the heart and soul of the Republican Party."

In 2019, Stickland authored a bill to ban red light cameras in Texas. The bill passed the legislature and was signed into law by Governor Greg Abbott. This was the first bill introduced by Stickland to become law.

=== Ratings and endorsements ===
Following his first session in 2015, Texas Monthly rated Stickland as Texas's worst legislator; at the end of the 2019 legislative session, when Texas Monthly published its perennial Best and Worst Legislators list, it gave Stickland the "first-ever Cockroach Award" for "a lawmaker who accomplishes nothing but always manages to show up in the worst possible way." The reasons given for the newly created award included a "needless" Twitter fight between Stickland and a prominent vaccine researcher, in which Stickland called vaccines "sorcery" before saying he was only objecting to government-mandated vaccines, and Stickland's verbal sparring with other representatives who resurrected Governor Greg Abbott's signature $100 million plan for high school mental health services after Stickland used a procedural maneuver to kill it.

The NRA Political Victory Fund graded Stickland an "A" rating and endorsed him in 2014. In 2017, Texans Uniting for Reform & Freedom scored Stickland 104 percent. In 2017, Texans for Fiscal Responsibility scored him at 100 percent and rated him as one of the top 10 Best Legislators of 2017.

In 2019, civil rights group Equality Texas gave Stickland a zero percent rating. Environmental groups gave Stickland low ratings; the Texas League of Conservation Voters gave Stickland a 14 percent rating in 2015, while Environment Texas gave Stickland a 10 percent rating in 2019.

The marijuana legalization advocacy group National Organization for the Reform of Marijuana Laws (NORML) gave Stickland a 58 percent rating in 2019. The Texas Association of Realtors gave Stickland a 50 percent rating in 2013.

== Defend Texas Liberty PAC ==
After serving in the legislature, Stickland worked as president of the Defend Texas Liberty PAC, a far-right group that worked to purge more moderate figures from the Texas Republican Party by intervening in primary elections. The group spent more than $15 million from 2020 to 2023 to oppose Republican Texas House Speaker Dade Phelan's allies in the 2022 legislative elections and support Don Huffines, who unsuccessfully challenged incumbent Republican Greg Abbott in the primary election for Texas governor. The group was also a major donor to Texas Lieutenant Governor Dan Patrick and Attorney General Ken Paxton. Almost all of the group's money was donated by Tim Dunn and Farris Wilks, both oil billionaires from West Texas.

=== Meeting with neo-Nazi and departure from PAC ===
In October 2023, Stickland met with Nick Fuentes, a well-known white supremacist and Adolf Hitler admirer, for almost seven hours. This prompted calls by some Republicans, including Phelan, for Republican politicians in Texas to return donations they had received from the PAC or donate them to charity. Patrick initially said he would keep the $3 million his campaign had received from Defend Texas Liberty PAC, but later reversed course and use the money to buy Israel bonds. Nine days after the meeting, Stickland was replaced as president of the PAC.

== Personal life ==
Stickland and his wife, Krissy, met in church. The couple has two daughters.

Texas House of Representatives
Preceded by Todd Smith	Texas State Representative from District 92 (part of Tarrant County); 2013–2021	Succeeded by Jeff Cason
