= 1990 Texas Comptroller of Public Accounts election =

- November 6, 1990
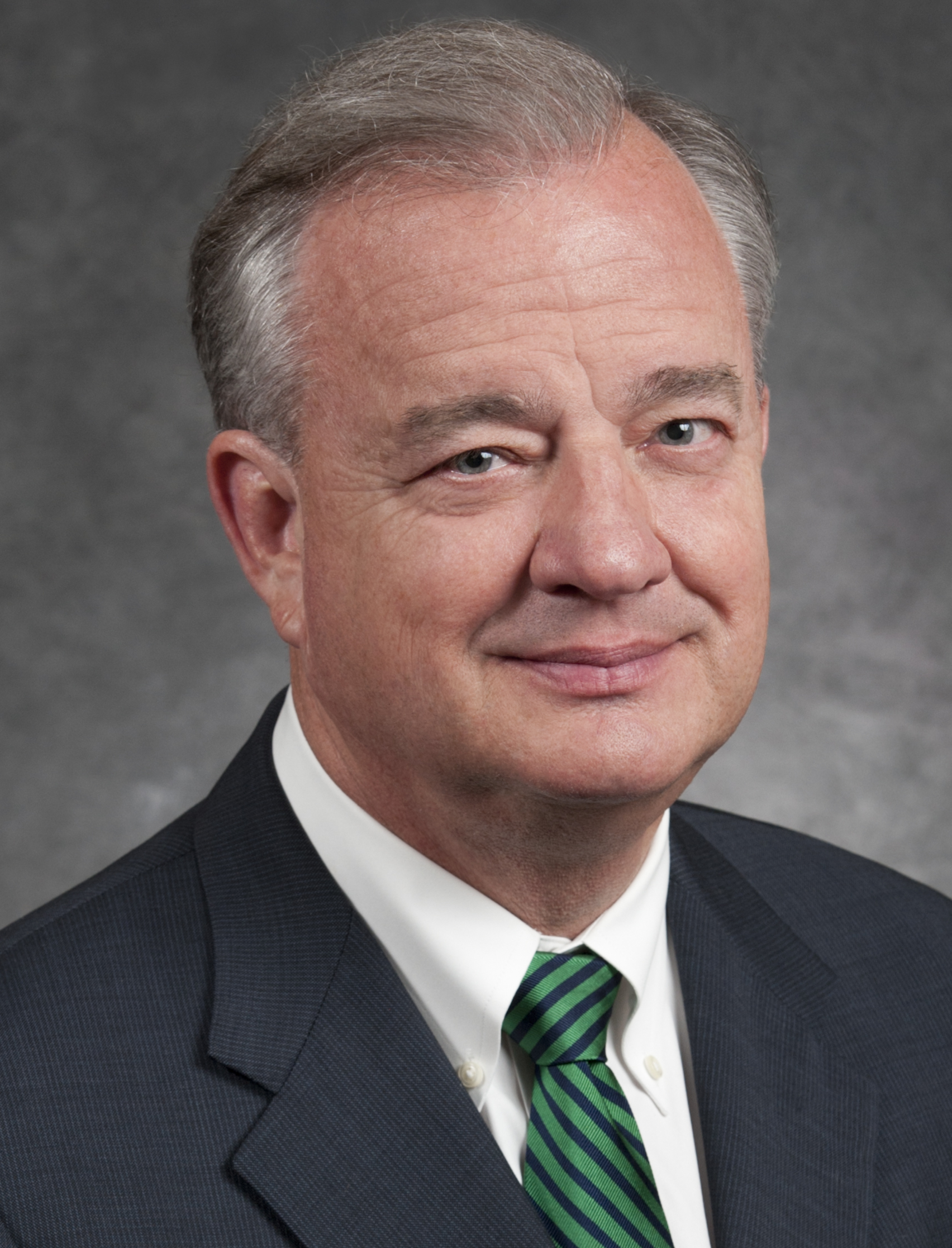

Nominee	John Sharp	Glenn Harding	Bill Grisham
Party	Democratic	Republican	Libertarian
Popular vote	2,314,680	1,150,226	211,997
Percentage	62.9%	31.3%	5.8%
Comptroller before election
Bob Bullock
Democratic
Elected Comptroller
John Sharp
Democratic

The 1990 Texas Comptroller of Public Accounts election took place on November 6, 1990, to elect the Comptroller of Public Accounts of Texas. The incumbent Democratic Comptroller Bob Bullock chose to run for lieutenant governor instead of seeking a fifth term. State senator John Sharp won the Democratic primary unopposed. In the general election he faced Republican nominee Warren "Glenn" Harding, Jr., the son of the former State Treasurer, Warren Harding. Sharp won the election by a wide margin and was sworn in as the 35th Comptroller on January 3, 1991.

== Republican primary ==
=== Results ===
Republican primary results
Party	Candidate	Votes	%
Republican	Glenn Harding	377,172	60.7
Republican	Jon Hall	173,673	27.9
Republican	Irby Ford	70,782	11.4
Total votes		621,627	100.0

== General election ==
=== Results ===
1990 election for Comptroller of Public Accounts
Party	Candidate	Votes	%	±%
Democratic	John Sharp	2,314,680	62.9	
Republican	Glen Harding	1,150,226	31.3	
Libertarian	Bill Grisham	211,997	5.8	
Total votes		4,178,615	100.00	
Democratic hold				
