= Tim Dunn (businessman) =

American businessman (born 1955)

- Born: Timothy Marvin Dunn; 1955 (age 70–71); Littlefield, Texas, U.S.
- Education: Texas Tech University (BS)
- Occupation: Businessman
- Spouse: Terri Spannaus (m. 1977)
- Children: 6, including David Dunn
- Website: www.timdunn.org

Timothy Marvin Dunn (born 1955) is an American businessman who is the chief executive officer of CrownQuest Operating, an oil and gas business he co-founded in 1996. He is influential in Texas politics, and is a major financial backer of various politically conservative causes and organizations. As of October 2026, Forbes estimated Dunn and his family's net worth at $1.8 billion.

== Early life and education ==
Timothy Marvin Dunn was born in Littlefield, Texas, to Joe and Thelma Dunn in 1955. He grew up in Big Spring, Texas, the youngest of four boys. He was an Eagle Scout, graduated from Big Spring High School in 1974, and earned a Bachelor of Science degree in chemical engineering from Texas Tech University in 1978. In high school, he played basketball, was a member of the Fellowship of Christian Athletes, and played guitar in a band called the Scrub Brotherhood.

== Career ==
Dunn began his career as an engineer at ExxonMobil, where he worked from 1978 to 1980. He went on to work in banking at First City National Bank in Midland, where he was employed until 1987. During his time with First City, he was senior vice president and manager of oil and gas lending. Dunn then was an executive at Parker & Parsley Petroleum until 1995, where he became chief financial officer. While at Parker & Parsley Petroleum, he oversaw securities transactions and became a supporter of tort reform.

In 1996, Dunn founded his own oil and gas company which became known as CrownQuest Operating. Dunn is CrownQuest's chief executive officer. CrownQuest controls significant portions of the Permian Basin and was the eighth-largest oil producer in Texas in 2022. In 2013, Dunn was named as top CEO of a large company by the Texas Independent Producers and Royalty Owners Association and Texas Monthly magazine. Dunn is a billionaire. Some of Dunn's wealth arose from acquiring cheap leases in the Permian Basin multiple years before the process of fracking allowed for the extraction of economical amounts of oil and gas. Dunn sold CrownQuest to Occidental Petroleum in December 2023, in a deal valued at $12.4 billion.

== Political involvement ==
Dunn is influential in state and local politics in Texas and has been called the most effective political donor in Texas. He was the largest individual source of campaign funds in Texas in 2022 and 2023. A backer of conservative causes, he has spent millions of dollars encouraging the Texas Republican Party and Texas Legislature to become more conservative.

He was a delegate in 1996 to the state's Republican convention.

In 2002, he donated to a PAC that supported bills prohibiting same-sex marriages and adoptions. Dunn opposed a 2006 Texas tax reform proposal to cut property taxes and replace them with new business taxes. He presented a proposal to the Texas Tax Reform Commission showing how school property taxes could be eliminated by using surplus tax revenue and curbing spending.

In 2006, he formed and became the primary financial backer of the conservative advocacy group Empower Texans to fight a tax on investor-financed oil wells. Dunn serves on the board of the Community News Foundation, a media organization that publishes the Texas Scorecard. Dunn is a founding board member of Citizens for Self-Governance, which spearheads the Convention of States project, a national effort seeking to call an Article V convention to propose amendments to the U.S. Constitution. He is also a member of the board of directors of the Lucy Burns Institute.

Dunn is vice chairman of the board of directors at the Texas Public Policy Foundation (TPPF). He helped to found the Center for Effective Criminal Justice at TPPF. The center is part of the Right on Crime movement; it advocates criminal justice reform and emphasizes restorative justice and alternatives to incarceration to reduce the prisoner population. Dunn supported juvenile-justice reform legislation in 2011.

As of 2022, Dunn had given almost US$10 million to the Defend Texas Liberty PAC, which spent its money challenging Republican incumbents it views as insufficiently conservative. Nearly all of his donations during 2022 and 2023 went to the PAC, and Dunn was the majority funder of the PAC. As of August 2022, Federal Election Commission data showed that Dunn had made more than 300 political donations since 2008. After Defend Texas Liberty President Jonathan Stickland was found to have met with white supremacist Nick Fuentes, Stickland was replaced as president and the organization put out a statement opposing Fuentes' views. While Defend Texas Liberty was still a functioning PAC for the 2024 election cycle, much of Dunn's funding began going to a newly formed PAC: Texans United for a Conservative Majority. The group helped candidates win multiple Texas House primary races in open seats as well as in challenges against incumbents in 2024.

Dunn gave $5 million to the super PAC Make America Great Again Inc., making him one of Donald Trump's largest donors. He has also provided funding to America First Legal and the Center for Renewing America. Since 2021, Dunn has been a board member of the America First Policy Institute.

== Educational and religious involvement ==
Dunn co-founded the Midland Classical Academy, a nonprofit Christian school, where he is on the board of trustees and was a volunteer assistant basketball coach. The academy uses the Socratic method to teach a curriculum rooted in the development of western civilization. Dunn is on the board of directors of the Grace School of Theology, a Christian seminary with a vision to become "A Seminary to the World," and the First Liberty Institute, a Christian legal defense organization. He is the chairman of the Christian Advisory Board of the Israel Allies Foundation, a non-governmental organization formed in 2007 by Israeli rabbi and politician Binyamin Elon to encourage cooperation among faith-based supporters of Israel in parliaments and legislatures worldwide. Dunn, who Forbes called "staunchly anti-abortion", funds adoption services and foster homes for over 300 children in West Texas.

In March 2024, Texas Monthly called Dunn "a key player in the growing Christian nationalism movement", though he rejects the label, saying "I don't think the term squares with biblical teaching." In April 2024, Dunn wrote an opinion editorial in which he said "A recent disparagement is a claim that I support and am a leader in something called 'Christian Nationalism,' a made-up label that conflicts with biblical teaching...Apparently, the Left is equating the term 'Christian Nationalism' with authoritarianism. This makes the term not only unbiblical but un-American."

== Personal life ==
Dunn met his wife, Terri Dunn (née Spannaus), while attending Texas Tech University and they married after his junior year of college, on May 14, 1977. They have six children and twenty grandchildren. Their two-year-old granddaughter, Moriah Wimberly, died in 2015. In 2018, Dunn wrote a book about the experience of losing her, Yellow Balloons: Finding Power To Live Above Your Circumstances. The Dunns reside in Midland, Texas, where they are members of Midland Bible Church. One of Dunn's sons is the Christian singer-songwriter David Dunn.

== Bibliography ==
- Yellow Balloons. 2018.
