= John Sharp (Texas politician) =

American politician

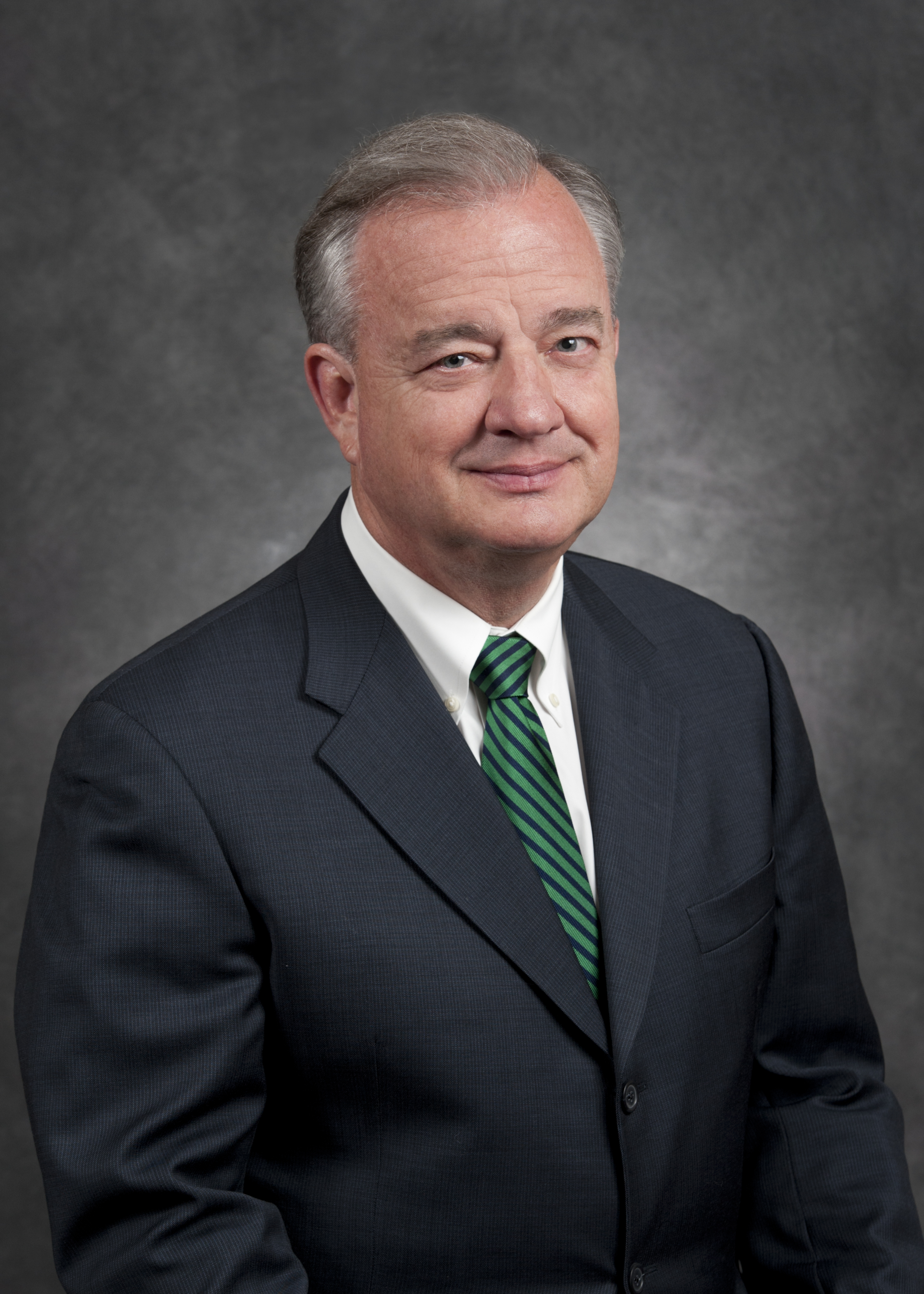
- Sharp in 2012

14th Chancellor of the Texas A&M University System
- In office August 15, 2011 – June 30, 2025
- Preceded by: Mike McKinney
- Succeeded by: Glenn Hegar

35th Comptroller of Texas
- In office January 3, 1991 – January 2, 1999
- Governor: Ann Richards; George W. Bush
- Preceded by: Bob Bullock
- Succeeded by: Carole Keeton Strayhorn

Railroad Commissioner of Texas
- In office January 6, 1987 – January 22, 1991
- Governor: Mark White; Bill Clements
- Preceded by: Clark Jobe
- Succeeded by: Lena Guerrero

Member of the Texas Senate from the 18th district
- In office November 20, 1982 – January 6, 1987
- Preceded by: John Wilson
- Succeeded by: Ken Armbrister

Member of the Texas House of Representatives from the 40th district
- In office January 9, 1979 – November 20, 1982
- Preceded by: Joseph P. Wyatt Jr.
- Succeeded by: Alex Moreno

Personal details
- Born: John Spencer Sharp; July 28, 1950 (age 76) Placedo, Texas, U.S.
- Party: Democratic
- Spouses: Charlotte Han (m. 1978; died 2020); Diana Atchison (m. 2023)
- Children: 2
- Education: Texas A&M University (BA); Texas State University (MPA)

Military service
- Allegiance: United States
- Branch/service: United States Army
- Years of service: 1972–1976
- Rank: Second Lieutenant
- Unit: United States Army Reserve

John Spencer Sharp (born July 28, 1950) is an American politician from Texas who served as the chancellor of the Texas A&M University System from 2011 to 2025. A member of the Democratic Party, he previously served as Comptroller of Texas from 1991 to 1999, a Railroad Commissioner of Texas from 1987 to 1991, and a member of the Texas Legislature from 1979 to 1987.

Sharp is also a principal in the Austin office of the Dallas-based Ryan & Company, a tax consulting firm. In 2005, he was appointed as chairman of the Texas Tax Reform Commission. He was appointed by Rick Perry and the Texas A&M University System Board of Regents as the 14th Chancellor of the Texas A&M University System in 2011, serving until his retirement in 2025.

== Education and early life ==
The son of an oil field worker and a school teacher, Sharp grew up in the small farming community of Placedo, Texas. In 1972, Sharp earned a Bachelor of Arts degree in political science from Texas A&M University in College Station, where he was a member of Squadron 6 in the Corps of Cadets and was elected class president his sophomore year, and eventually Student Body President. Upon graduation, he was commissioned as a second lieutenant in the United States Army Reserves. He belongs to American Legion Post 76 in Austin.

In 1976, Sharp received a master's degree in Public Administration from Texas State University in San Marcos while working full-time in Austin with the Legislative Budget Board. In 1978, Sharp returned to Victoria, Texas, where he opened a real estate firm with a partner, the former County Commissioner Gene Martin.

== Political career ==
=== Early career ===
In 1973, Sharp started working as an analyst for the Texas Legislative Budget Board. He was selected by the Lt. Governor William P. Hobby Jr. to be on the 10-man committee that implemented zero-based budgeting.

Sharp began his political career in 1975 as the chief campaign aide in Phil Gramm's campaign for the 1976 U.S. Senate election in Texas. After being asked by The Bryan-College Station Eagle why he decided to take the job, he was quoted, "A perfect set of examples is the federal government's involvement with the brucellosis program and forced busing. I think Gramm has the courage to stop things like that."

=== Texas Legislature ===
In 1978, Sharp ran unopposed and was elected to the Texas House of Representatives from the 40th District in Victoria and was later named one of the best newcomers to the House by Texas Monthly, along with Bill Messer. Just a few weeks after his re-election for a third two-year term in the general election of 1982, he ran for the seat left open in the Texas Senate in the special election that took place after John Wilson had won re-election despite already being dead.

He won the special election runoff against Tim Von Dohlen and served a full four-year term in the Texas Senate. He was appointed to the several committees, including the Senate Committee on Finance in 1985. He was elected to the Texas Railroad Commission in 1986.

In 1985, while in the state legislature, Sharp proposed a law restricting abortion rights in Texas. Then-State Treasurer Ann Richards helped kill the bill. When he ran for statewide office, Sharp moderated his anti-abortion views.

In 1990, Sharp was elected as the 35th State Comptroller of Public Accounts for the State of Texas. He was re-elected in 1994. In 1998, he did not seek a third term as comptroller but instead lost the race for lieutenant governor to Rick Perry, by 2% of the vote. Government Sharp ran for lieutenant governor again in 2002, but was defeated, losing by 6% to David Dewhurst, then the Land Commissioner.

Upon taking office as Comptroller, Sharp pledged to "make government work more like our most successful businesses." During his eight years as Comptroller, Sharp established the Texas Performance Review (TPR), an ongoing audit on state government. During Sharp's two 4-year terms as Comptroller, the TPR changed the way government does business through the Council on Competitive Government. Other programs implemented under the leadership of Sharp during these eight years included:

- The Texas Tomorrow Fund: A pre-paid college tuition plan that allows over 80,000 Texas families to pre-pay to lock in the future costs of their children's college tuition.
- The Lone Star Card: First recommended by Sharp in 1991. This program switched the state's paper food stamp coupons to computerized bank-type cards.

As Comptroller, Sharp also commanded the Texas Lottery. He contracted out most of the work, with the state lottery having only 189 employees (compared to California's 1,000 and Florida's 750), He later turned it over to the new Texas Lottery Commission.

In 2005, Sharp was asked to head an education task force – called the Texas Tax Reform Commission – charged with preparing a bi-partisan education plan for the state. The special session convened on April 17, 2006. Sharp accepted the offer and removed himself as a potential candidate for governor in 2006. The task force issued its final plan several months later, and the legislature adopted it. Sharp was nominated for the "Texan of the Year" Award in 2005. He has taken credit for preventing a state income tax from being adopted in the state, saying, "I killed the state income tax twice".

=== Senate campaign ===
On December 4, 2008, Republican U.S. Senator Kay Bailey Hutchison announced the creation of an exploratory committee for the Texas governor's race in 2010. Had she won the governorship, Hutchison would have been required to vacate her Senate seat by January 2011. If she were to stay in the Senate and not run for governor, she would have been up for re-election to the Senate in 2012. On December 8, 2008, Sharp became the first Democrat to announce his intention to run for this Senate seat, regardless of Hutchison's decision. Unlike several other candidates for the office, Sharp did not create an exploratory committee but immediately began raising funds and campaigning in 2009. During his campaign for the Senate, he criticized the governor, Rick Perry, for his comments about secession. He said in a statement, "During World War II my father was shot in defense of the greatest country on Earth, and I proudly wore the uniform of a United States Army reserve officer. So I'm offended when it becomes acceptable for anybody to talk about Texas leaving the Union. I'm running for the United States Senate because we need mainstream, common-sense leadership to clean up the mess in Washington, D.C., not a bunch of radical, anti-American rhetoric."

== Chancellor of the Texas A&M University System ==
On August 15, 2011, John Sharp was appointed by Governor Rick Perry and the A&M Board of Regents to be chancellor of the Texas A&M University System. At the time, Sharp had never worked in academia. All the members of the Board of Regents that voted to hire Sharp were appointed by Perry.

In 2012, Sharp announced that A&M was selected to develop one of three U.S. Department of Health and Human Services Centers for Innovation in Advanced Development and Manufacturing. Sharp outsourced the student dining program, landscaping, maintenance, dining and custodial services to private companies, which prompted protests for university employees who feared losing their jobs. Some 1,600 employees of Texas A&M shifted to be employed by Compass Group USA under their contract. Prior to the contract being awarded to Compass Group USA, the company was providing landscaping, building maintenance, custodial and dining services to Texas A&M University–Corpus Christi. Sharp also leased land owned by Texas A&M to private developers. He announced a system-wide accountability website known as EmpowerU using software based on the institution-specific accountability website at Texas A&M University. Sharp also added "Texas A&M" to the names of seven agencies and said the names of Prairie View A&M University and Tarleton State University could not be changed as it would require legislation to be passed.

Sharp announced A&M's complete acquisition of Texas Wesleyan University's School of Law and its renaming to Texas A&M University School of Law in August 2013.

In February 2018, two months after Jimbo Fisher was appointed as the head coach of Texas A&M football team, Sharp presented him with a plaque commemorating the Aggies' national championship in the year "20--", telling Fisher, "you get to fill in the date". He played a pivotal role in helping the Texas A&M University System receive a 10-year agreement to co-manage the Los Alamos National Laboratory with the University of California System.

On October 1, 2019, Sharp announced a system-wide ban on vaping, writing in the announcement memo that the "health threat is serious enough that I want to see the ban inside every building, outside space, parking lot, garage and laboratory within the Texas A&M System."

His contract as chancellor was extended in 2021 by seven years, and was scheduled to end in 2028.

On March 7, 2023, a guest lecture by Texas A&M University professor Joy Alonzo at the University of Texas Medical Branch (UTMB) criticized Texas Lieutenant Governor Dan Patrick's role in the opioid crisis. Shortly afterward, Patrick contacted Sharp about Alonzo. Alonzo was placed on administrative leave immediately, and was formally censured by UTMB. The investigation by Texas A&M found no evidence of wrongdoing, and Dr. Alonzo's leave was ended two weeks later. The vice chancellor of marketing and communications for Texas A&M later said Alonzo "had no issue with how the University handled the situation." In the summer of 2023 Sharp spoke at the groundbreaking of the first building for Texas A&M University–Fort Worth. After the controversies of the botched attempted hiring of A&M graduate and University of Texas at Austin journalism professor Kathleen McElroy to revitalize the journalism department, and the suspension of pharmacy professor Joy Alonzo at Texas A&M University, Sharp publicly apologized in an op-ed published by the Austin American-Statesman.

The Texas A&M University System announced they had been awarded a federal contract to comanage the Pantex Plant on June 14, 2024. In the announcement, Sharp said in a statement, "We take our national security responsibilities seriously, and we will bring the same level of care and expertise to Pantex as we have done for the past several years to Los Alamos."

On July 1, 2024, Sharp announced he would depart from the position on June 30, 2025. He was succeeded by former Texas Comptroller Glenn Hegar, who assumed the chancellorship the following day.

== Personal life ==
In 1978, he married Charlotte Han. They have a son, Spencer, and a daughter, Victoria. Charlotte died in December 2020.

He owns a 1,600-acre ranch 30 minutes from College Station where he raises cattle and goats. After his retirement, he will move to Austin to be close to his children and grandchildren.

== Honors & awards ==
Sharp has received numerous awards. Texas State University presented Sharp with the "Distinguished Alumni Award" in 1996, where he also taught a course on Texas state government for several semesters in the early 2000s. He was awarded the Texas A&M University Distinguished Alumnus Award in 2018.

In 2022, the City of Bryan renamed State Highway 47 into John Sharp Parkway, due to his service at A&M, the development of the RELLIS campus, and Texas A&M's expansions into the city.

=== List of awards ===
- Best Newcomer in the Texas House of Representatives, Texas Monthly, 1979 (Note: Jointly awarded with Bill Messer.)
- Distinguished Alumni Award, Texas State University, 1996
- Person of the Year, Rio Grande Guardian, 2015
- Distinguished Alumnus Award, Texas A&M University, 2018

== Notes ==
Political offices
Preceded by Bob Bullock	Texas Comptroller of Public Accounts; 1991–1999	Succeeded by Carole Keeton Strayhorn
Party political offices
Preceded by Bob Bullock	Democratic nominee for Texas Comptroller of Public Accounts; 1990, 1994	Succeeded by Paul W. Hobby
Preceded by Bob Bullock	Democratic nominee for Lieutenant Governor of Texas; 1998, 2002	Succeeded by Maria Luisa Alvarado
Texas Senate
Preceded by John Wilson	Member of the Texas Senate from District 18; 1982–1987	Succeeded by Ken Armbrister
Texas House of Representatives
Preceded by Joseph P. Wyatt Jr.	Member of the Texas House of Representatives from District 40 (Victoria); 1979–1982	Succeeded by Alex Moreno
