= Dan and Farris Wilks =

American petroleum industry businessmen

Daniel Howard Wilks (born 1955 or 1956) and Farris Cullen Wilks (born 1951 or 1952) are American petroleum industry businessmen. The sons of a bricklayer, the brothers established Wilks Masonry in 1995. They went on to found an early hydraulic fracking company, Frac Tech, in 2002, and eventually became billionaires. In 2011, they sold their 70% interest in Frac Tech for $3.5 billion. They reside in Cisco, Texas.

They are major investors in and funders of conservative causes, including The Daily Wire and PragerU.

== Personal lives ==
=== Early lives ===
The brothers are sons of Myrtle and Gwyn Voy Wilks (went by his middle name) of Cisco in Eastland County, east of Abilene, Texas. When the brothers were born, their father worked as a bricklayer and the family was destitute; the brothers once slept in a goat shed.

=== Assembly of Yahweh ===
In 1947, a group of parishioners from the Ramsey Church of Christ were disfellowshipped after a doctrinal dispute; these members included Charlie Fenter and his son-in-law Voy Wilks. The new group founded a church in De Leon, TX called “A Church of Christ.” In 1952, Charlie Fenter separated from that church, and created a congregation which today calls itself the Assembly of Yahweh. The Assembly of Yahweh is not trinitarian and does not adhere to Nicene Christianity; the Assembly believes that "Yahweh is One, the heavenly Father alone," but recognizes Jesus, whom they call Yahshua, as "His Son, the Messiah" and "our King, Messiah, Mediator, and High Priest." The Assembly is seventh-day Sabbatarian.

Fenter died in May 1952, and Voy Wilks took over the congregation. Voy Wilks is listed as the "Founder" of the Assembly of Yahweh on their website.

In 1962 they adopted the name Church of God (7th day) (not to be confused with Church of God (Seventh Day)); in 1982 the church became the Assembly of Yahweh (7th day). Currently the Assembly of Yahweh (7th day) is a conservative Judaizing congregation. It teaches that "the true religion is Jewish (not a Gentile religion)" and its members celebrate the Old Testament holidays rather than those related to the New Testament. The congregation considers the Old Testament historically and scientifically accurate. The congregation considers homosexuality and abortion to be crimes.

=== Farris Wilks ===
Farris Wilks is married to Jo Ann and is the father of 11 children. He is the current pastor and bishop of the Assembly of Yahweh (7th day) near Cisco. In sermons, he has denounced homosexuality and abortion.

=== Dan Wilks ===
Dan Wilks is married, with six children, and lives in Cisco, Texas.

== Frac Tech and subsequent business ventures ==
In 2002, the brothers founded a hydraulic fracturing company called Frac Tech. In 2011 they sold their 70% interest in Frac Tech for $3.5 billion.

After selling Frac Tech in 2011, Dan and Farris Wilks continued to invest in the oil-field services sector. In 2025, the Wilks family office acquired roughly a 10 percent equity stake in U.S. Well Services, contributing about $47.5 million to the company. The purchase expanded their influence in the hydraulic-fracturing industry and marked one of the brothers' largest public investments since leaving Frac Tech.

Their company ProFrac entered a licensing and equipment-development agreement with U.S. Well Services to produce and operate electric hydraulic-fracturing fleets, which are designed to reduce emissions compared with traditional diesel-powered systems.

Dan Wilks acquired an active stake in NexTier Oilfield Solutions, describing the firm’s shares as undervalued and signaling potential interest in influencing corporate strategy. Industry reports noted that this continued investment activity suggests the Wilks brothers remain significant players in the consolidation and technological evolution of the U.S. fracking-services sector.

== Real estate holdings ==
=== Idaho ===
As early as 2016 Dan and Farris Wilks began purchasing large quantities of land in Central Idaho, mainly in Ada, Boise, and Valley counties. They restricted access to the locals with gates, with anti-vehicle ditches, and with no-trespassing signs appearing soon after their acquisitions. They informed Valley County that they were terminating leases to roads and snowmobile trails, including a main road which was the only access to public lands. According to the United States Forest Service, some of the brothers' restrictions were illegal. The brothers' restrictions on hunting, snowmobiling, firewood cutting and transit frustrated locals. In 2017 a video emerged of an armed and uniformed DF Development security guard expelling an outdoorsman from a public road, Forest Road 409 (Clear Creek Road), which runs through Dan and Farris Wilks' land, on grounds of trespass. According to the Valley County Roads Department superintendent, the DF Development guard was in the wrong, as both the road and a 33-foot easement on either side belong to the county, and as such are public land.

As of 2019, Dan and Farris Wilks' shell company, DF Development, owned approximately 75,000 acres of land across 306 parcels in Valley County. Overall, Dan and Farris Wilks' own about 200,000 acres in Idaho.

=== Montana ===
In Montana, Dan and Farris Wilks own approximately 341,000 acres across seven counties. Their largest acquisition is the N-Bar Ranch in Fergus County.

== Political activity ==
According to ProPublica, writing in 2024, the brothers have funded a number of efforts in Texas directed at the Texas State Legislature, supporting "a network of think tanks, media organizations, political action committees and nonprofits that work in lock step to purge the Legislature of Republicans whose votes they can’t rely on."

=== Elections and campaigns ===
- Dan and Farris Wilks supported Texas U.S. Senator Ted Cruz in the 2016 United States presidential election, contributing $15 million to a super political action committee backing Cruz's campaign.
- They gave $50,000 in 2016 to the candidacy of Jeff Judson, who unsuccessfully challenged fellow Republican Joe Straus, Speaker of the Texas House of Representatives, in the District 121 Republican legislative primary in March 2016.
- They contributed $300,350 to Donald Trump's 2020 presidential campaign.
- Farris Wilks gave $75,000 to Jeff Cason in the 2020 Republican primary in the contest to replace Jonathan Stickland in Texas State House District 92.
- Their Defend Texas Liberty PAC gave more than $3 million to the Don Huffines 2022 Texas gubernatorial campaign.

=== Political media ===
Dan and Farris Wilks were early investors in political commentator Ben Shapiro's media company The Daily Wire, a conservative news and opinion website in 2015. Additionally, Dan and Farris Wilks provided early-stage funding to Prager University, a YouTube channel and media company started by Dennis Prager to further conservative causes to a young audience. They are major donors to conservative advocacy group Empower Texans.

=== Advocacy groups ===
Farris Wilks has donated about $3 million to WallBuilders.

He is also a donor to "Texans United for a Conservative Majority", Empower Texans, the Heritage Foundation and Focus on the Family.
