= Placedo, Texas =

- CDP
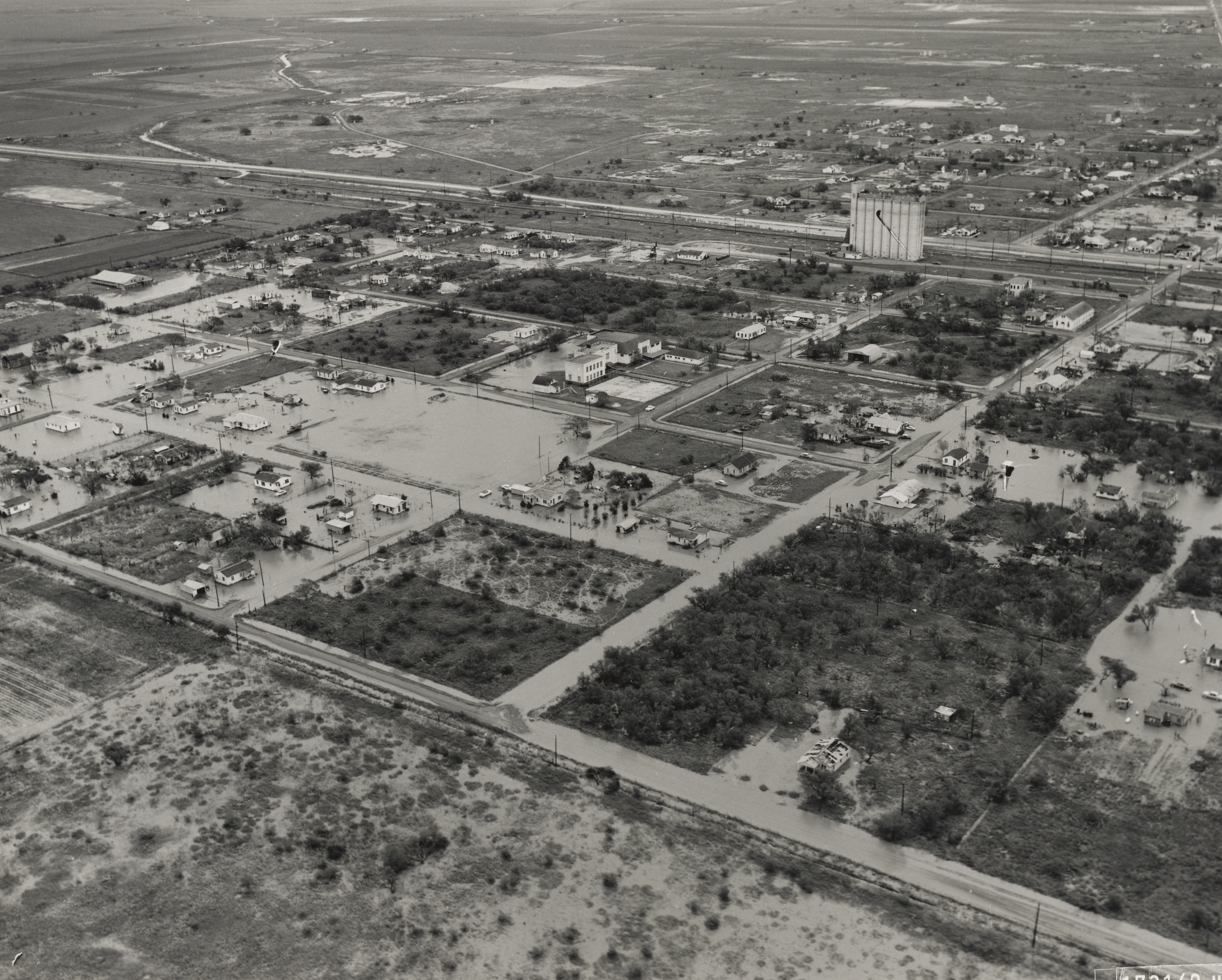
- Placedo after Hurricane Carla, 1961
- Interactive map of Placedo, Texas
- Coordinates: 28°41′31″N 96°49′33″W
- Country: United States
- State: Texas
- County: Victoria County

Area
  - Total: 0.62 sq mi (1.6 km^{2})
  - Land: 0.62 sq mi (1.6 km^{2})
  - Water: 0 sq mi (0.0 km^{2})

Population (2010)
  - Total: 692
  - Density: 1,100/sq mi (430/km^{2})
- Time zone: UTC-6 (Central (CST))
  - Summer (DST): UTC-5 (CDT)
- Zip Code: 77977

Placedo is a census-designated place (CDP) in Victoria County, Texas, United States. It was a new CDP for the 2010 census. As of the 2020 census, Placedo had a population of 625.

It is part of the Victoria, Texas Metropolitan Statistical Area.

== Geography ==
Placedo is located at 28°41′31″N 96°49′33″W (28.691936, -96.825904). It is situated along U.S. Highway 87 in southeastern Victoria County, approximately 14 miles southeast of Victoria.

The CDP has a total area of 0.6 square miles (1.6 km^{2}), all land.

== Demographics ==
Historical population
Census	Pop.	Note	%±
2010	692		—
2020	625		−9.7%
U.S. Decennial Census; 1850–1900 1910; 1920 1930 1940; 1950 1960 1970; 1980 1990 2000; 2010 2020

Placedo first appeared as a census designated place in the 2010 U.S. census.

=== 2020 census ===
Placedo CDP, Texas – Racial and ethnic composition Note: the US Census treats Hispanic/Latino as an ethnic category. This table excludes Latinos from the racial categories and assigns them to a separate category. Hispanics/Latinos may be of any race.
Race / Ethnicity (NH = Non-Hispanic)	Pop 2010	Pop 2020	% 2010	% 2020
White alone (NH)	146	127	21.10%	20.32%
Black or African American alone (NH)	23	15	3.32%	2.40%
Native American or Alaska Native alone (NH)	0	5	0.14%	0.80%
Asian alone (NH)	0	5	0.00%	0.80%
Native Hawaiian or Pacific Islander alone (NH)	0	2	0.00%	0.32%
Other race alone (NH)	0	0	0.00%	0.00%
Mixed race or Multiracial (NH)	7	9	1.01%	1.44%
Hispanic or Latino (any race)	515	462	74.42%	73.92%
Total	692	625	100.00%	100.00%

== History ==
A settlement has existed at the site since the Republic of Texas era. The community is named for Plácido Benavides, a participant and organizer of volunteer troops in the Texas Revolution, and an early settler who established a ranch in the area during the 1830s. The San Antonio and Mexican Gulf Railroad established a station at Placedo in 1860. In 1906, the St. Louis, Brownsville and Mexico Railway crossed the old line and renamed the station Placedo Junction. Placedo was platted in 1910 and infrastructure improvements, including sidewalks and gutters, were added. By 1920, the community had a population of 300 with a bank, school, and several businesses. Much of the community was damaged during a 1925 hurricane and the population didn't begin to recover until the mid-1930s. In the following years, Placedo's population fluctuated from 400 in the 1940s to 220 in 1949, and rose to 480 by the mid-1960s and 515 a decade later. The number of inhabitants remained at that level until 2000, when an estimated 760 people were living in the community.

Placedo has a post office with the ZIP code 77977.

== Education ==
Public education in the community of Placedo is provided by the Bloomington Independent School District. The district has four schools, one of which is located in Placedo. Placedo Elementary School serves Bloomington ISD students in grades pre - kindergarten through first grade.

All of the county is in the service area of Victoria College.

== Notable people ==
- John Sharp, former Texas Comptroller of Public Accounts (1991-1999) and, since 2011, chancellor of the Texas A&M University System, is a native of Placedo.
- Josh Looman, lead game designer on the Madden video game franchise, is a native of Placedo.
