= Texas's 18th Senate district =

American legislative district

Texas's 18th State Senate district
Senator
Lois Kolkhorst; R–Brenham
- Demographics: 46.4% White; 13% Black; 31.2% Hispanic; 9.6% Asian
- Population: 956,463

District 18 of the Texas Senate is a senatorial district that currently serves all of Aransas, Austin, Burleson, Calhoun, DeWitt, Fayette, Goliad, Gonzales, Grimes, Lavaca, Lee, Refugio, Victoria, and Washington counties, and portions of Fort Bend, Harris, Montgomery, Waller counties in the U.S. state of Texas.

The current senator from District 18 is Lois Kolkhorst.

== Biggest cities in the district ==
District 18 has a population of 809,726 with 587,890 that is at voting age from the 2010 census.

	Name	County	Pop. (Note: Population is based on the number of people in the district in that city, not the overall population of that city)
1	Victoria	Victoria	62,592
2	Rosenberg	Fort Bend	28,651
3	Bay City	Matagorda	17,614
4	Brenham	Washington	15,716
5	Katy	Fort Bend/Harris/Waller	14,102

== Election history ==
Election history of District 18 from 1992. (Note: Uncontested primary elections are not shown.)

=== 2022 ===
Texas general election, 2022: Senate District 18
Party	Candidate	Votes	%	±%
Republican	Lois Kolkhorst (Incumbent)	186,367	66.17	+0.38
Democratic	Josh Tutt	95,287	33.83	−0.38
Turnout		281,654	100.00	
Republican hold				

=== 2020 ===
Texas general election, 2020: Senate District 18
Party	Candidate	Votes	%	±%
Republican	Lois Kolkhorst (Incumbent)	277,872	65.79	−19.99
Democratic	Michael Antalan	144,489	34.21	+34.21
Turnout		422,361	100.00	
Republican hold				

=== 2016 ===
Texas general election, 2016: Senate District 18
Party	Candidate	Votes	%	±%
Republican	Lois Kolkhorst (Incumbent)	229,051	85.78	
Libertarian	Kathie L. Stone	37,965	14.22	
Turnout		267,016		
Republican hold				

=== 2014 (special) ===
Texas special general election, 2014: Senate District 18
Party	Candidate	Votes	%	±%
Republican	Lois Kolkhorst	21,961	55.81	
Republican	Gary Gates	13,439	34.15	
Democratic	Cindy Drabek	1,893	4.81	
Democratic	Christian E. Hawkins	1,280	3.25	
Republican	Charles Gregory	779	1.98	
Turnout		39,352		
Republican hold				

=== 2012 ===
Texas general election, 2012: Senate District 18
Party	Candidate	Votes	%	±%
Republican	Glenn Hegar (Incumbent)	211,230	100.00	+29.57
Turnout		211,230		
Republican hold				

=== 2010 ===
Texas general election, 2010: Senate District 18
Party	Candidate	Votes	%	±%
Republican	Glenn Hegar (Incumbent)	146,087	70.43	−8.49
Democratic	Patricia "Pat" Olney	61,345	29.57	+29.57
Turnout		207,432		
Republican hold				

=== 2006 ===
Texas general election, 2006: Senate District 18
Party	Candidate	Votes	%	±%
Republican	Glenn Hegar	110,512	78.92	+33.80
Libertarian	Roy O. Wright, II	29,511	21.08	+19.51
Majority		81,001	57.85	+49.67
Turnout		140,023		−12.60
Republican gain from Democratic				

Republican primary, 2006: Senate District 18
Candidate		Votes	%	±
	Gary Gates	12,933	35.63	
✓	Glenn Hegar	19,934	54.92	
	David Stall	3,428	9.44	
Majority		7,001	19.29	
Turnout		36,295		

=== 2002 ===
Texas general election, 2002: Senate District 18
Party	Candidate	Votes	%	±%
Republican	Lester Phipps	72,296	45.13	+4.57
Democratic	Ken Armbrister (Incumbent)	85,401	53.31	−6.13
Libertarian	Horace Henley	2,508	1.57	+1.57
Majority		13,105	8.18	−10.70
Turnout		160,205		+11.65
Democratic hold				

Republican primary, 2002: Senate District 18
Candidate		Votes	%	±
✓	Lester Phipps	11,774	50.13	
	Michael Rozell	11,713	49.87	
Majority		61	0.26	
Turnout		23,487		

=== 1998 ===
Texas general election, 1998: Senate District 18
Party	Candidate	Votes	%	±%
Republican	Reese Turner	58,195	40.56	+40.56
Democratic	Ken Armbrister (Incumbent)	85,291	59.44	−40.56
Majority		27,096	18.88	−81.12
Turnout		143,486		+46.32
Democratic hold				

=== 1994 ===
Texas general election, 1994: Senate District 18
Party	Candidate	Votes	%	±%
Democratic	Ken Armbrister (Incumbent)	98,066	100.00	+40.34
Majority		98,066	100.00	+80.68
Turnout		98,066		−48.56
Democratic hold				

=== 1992 ===
Texas general election, 1992: Senate District 18
Party	Candidate	Votes	%	±%
Democratic	Ken Armbrister (Incumbent)	113,729	59.66	
Republican	Carolyn McDaniel	76,905	40.34	
Majority		6,824	19.32	
Turnout		190,634		
Democratic hold				

== District officeholders ==
Legislature	Senator, District 18	Counties in District
1	José Antonio Navarro	Bexar.
2	José Antonio Navarro	Bexar, Comal.
3	Alexander H. Phillips	Calhoun, DeWitt, Gonzales, Jackson, Matagorda, Victoria.
4	Franklin H. Merriman; Mark M. Potter	Brazoria, Galveston.
5	Cornelius McAnelly	Harris.
6	Edward A. Palmer	Harris.
7	Benjamin F. Tankersly; Hiram George Runnels	Harris.
8	Abram Morris Gentry	Harris.
9	John W. Durant	Brazos, Burleson, Leon, Madison, Robertson.
10	John W. Durant	Brazos, Burleson, Leon, Madison, Robertson.
11	James B. Boyd	Brazos, Burleson, Leon, Madison, Robertson.
12	Phidello W. Hall	Freestone, Leon, Robertson.
13	Phidello W. Hall	Freestone, Leon, Robertson.
14	William D. Wood	Brazos, Leon, Robertson.
15	John Thomas Brady	Harris, Montgomery.
16	Charles Stewart	Harris, Montgomery.
17	Charles Stewart	Harris, Montgomery.
18	William O. Davis	Cooke, Grayson.
19	William O. Davis	Cooke, Grayson.
20	Elbridge G. Douglass	Cooke, Grayson.
21	Elbridge G. Douglass; John W. Finlay	Cooke, Grayson.
22	Calhoun L. Potter	Cooke, Grayson.
23	Friench Simpson	Colorado, Fayette, Lavaca.
24	Friench Simpson	Colorado, Fayette, Lavaca.
25	Abnus B. Kerr	Colorado, Fayette, Lavaca.
26	Abnus B. Kerr	Colorado, Fayette, Lavaca.
27	David A. Paulus	Colorado, Fayette, Lavaca.
28	David A. Paulus	Austin, Colorado, Fayette, Lavaca.
29	David A. Paulus	Austin, Colorado, Fayette, Lavaca.
30	David A. Paulus	Austin, Colorado, Fayette, Lavaca.
31	David A. Paulus	Austin, Colorado, Fayette, Lavaca.
32	David A. Paulus	Austin, Colorado, Fayette, Lavaca.
33	David A. Paulus; Isaac E. Clark	Austin, Colorado, Fayette, Lavaca.
34	Isaac E. Clark	Austin, Colorado, Fayette, Lavaca.
35	Isaac E. Clark	Austin, Colorado, Fayette, Lavaca.
36	Isaac E. Clark	Austin, Colorado, Fayette, Lavaca.
37	Isaac E. Clark	Austin, Colorado, Fayette, Lavaca.
38	Isaac E. Clark	Austin, Colorado, Fayette, Lavaca.
39	John Heywood Bailey	Aransas, Atascosa, Bee, Calhoun, DeWitt, Goliad, Jackson, Karnes, Live Oak, Refugio, San Patricio, Victoria, Wilson.
40	John Heywood Bailey	Aransas, Atascosa, Bee, Calhoun, DeWitt, Goliad, Jackson, Karnes, Live Oak, Refugio, San Patricio, Victoria, Wilson.
41	James W. Stevenson	Aransas, Atascosa, Bee, Calhoun, DeWitt, Goliad, Jackson, Karnes, Live Oak, Refugio, San Patricio, Victoria, Wilson.
42	James W. Stevenson	Aransas, Atascosa, Bee, Calhoun, DeWitt, Goliad, Jackson, Karnes, Live Oak, Refugio, San Patricio, Victoria, Wilson.
43	Elmo J. Blackert	Aransas, Atascosa, Bee, Calhoun, DeWitt, Goliad, Jackson, Karnes, Live Oak, Refugio, San Patricio, Victoria, Wilson.
44	Elmo J. Blackert	Aransas, Atascosa, Bee, Calhoun, DeWitt, Goliad, Jackson, Karnes, Live Oak, Refugio, San Patricio, Victoria, Wilson.
45	Morris Roberts	Aransas, Atascosa, Bee, Calhoun, DeWitt, Goliad, Jackson, Karnes, Live Oak, Refugio, San Patricio, Victoria, Wilson.
46	Morris Roberts	Aransas, Atascosa, Bee, Calhoun, DeWitt, Goliad, Jackson, Karnes, Live Oak, Refugio, San Patricio, Victoria, Wilson.
47	Fred Mauritz	Aransas, Atascosa, Bee, Calhoun, DeWitt, Goliad, Jackson, Karnes, Live Oak, Refugio, San Patricio, Victoria, Wilson.
48	Fred Mauritz	Aransas, Atascosa, Bee, Calhoun, DeWitt, Goliad, Jackson, Karnes, Live Oak, Refugio, San Patricio, Victoria, Wilson.
49	Fred Mauritz	Aransas, Atascosa, Bee, Calhoun, DeWitt, Goliad, Jackson, Karnes, Live Oak, Refugio, San Patricio, Victoria, Wilson.
50	Fred Mauritz	Aransas, Atascosa, Bee, Calhoun, DeWitt, Goliad, Jackson, Karnes, Live Oak, Refugio, San Patricio, Victoria, Wilson.
51	John Junior Bell	Aransas, Atascosa, Bee, Calhoun, DeWitt, Goliad, Jackson, Karnes, Live Oak, Refugio, San Patricio, Victoria, Wilson.
52	John Junior Bell	Aransas, Atascosa, Bee, Calhoun, DeWitt, Goliad, Jackson, Karnes, Live Oak, Refugio, San Patricio, Victoria, Wilson.
53	John Junior Bell; William S. Fly	Aransas, Bee, Calhoun, DeWitt, Goliad, Jackson, Karnes, Live Oak, McMullen, Refugio, San Patricio, Victoria.
54	William S. Fly	Aransas, Bee, Calhoun, DeWitt, Goliad, Jackson, Karnes, Live Oak, McMullen, Refugio, San Patricio, Victoria.
55	William S. Fly	Aransas, Bee, Calhoun, DeWitt, Goliad, Jackson, Karnes, Live Oak, McMullen, Refugio, San Patricio, Victoria.
56	William S. Fly	Aransas, Bee, Calhoun, DeWitt, Goliad, Jackson, Karnes, Live Oak, McMullen, Refugio, San Patricio, Victoria.
57	William Neff "Bill" Patman	Aransas, Bee, Calhoun, DeWitt, Goliad, Jackson, Karnes, Live Oak, McMullen, Refugio, San Patricio, Victoria.
58	William Neff "Bill" Patman	Aransas, Bee, Calhoun, DeWitt, Goliad, Jackson, Karnes, Live Oak, McMullen, Refugio, San Patricio, Victoria.
59	William Neff "Bill" Patman	Aransas, Bee, Calhoun, DeWitt, Goliad, Jackson, Karnes, Live Oak, McMullen, Refugio, San Patricio, Victoria.
60	William Neff "Bill" Patman	Aransas, Austin, Calhoun, Colorado, DeWitt, Gonzales, Guadalupe, Jackson, Lavaca, Matagorda, San Patricio, Victoria, Washington, Wharton.
61	William Neff "Bill" Patman	Aransas, Austin, Calhoun, Colorado, DeWitt, Gonzales, Guadalupe, Jackson, Lavaca, Matagorda, San Patricio, Victoria, Washington, Wharton.
62	William Neff "Bill" Patman	Aransas, Austin, Calhoun, Colorado, DeWitt, Gonzales, Guadalupe, Jackson, Lavaca, Matagorda, San Patricio, Victoria, Washington, Wharton.
63	William Neff "Bill" Patman	Bastrop, Bell, DeWitt, Fayette, Goliad, Gonzales, Jackson, Karnes, Lavaca, Lee, Milam, Victoria, Williamson.
64	William Neff "Bill" Patman	Bastrop, Bell, DeWitt, Fayette, Goliad, Gonzales, Jackson, Karnes, Lavaca, Lee, Milam, Victoria, Williamson.
65	William Neff "Bill" Patman	Bastrop, Bell, DeWitt, Fayette, Goliad, Gonzales, Jackson, Karnes, Lavaca, Lee, Milam, Victoria, Williamson.
66	William Neff "Bill" Patman	Bastrop, Bell, DeWitt, Fayette, Goliad, Gonzales, Jackson, Karnes, Lavaca, Lee, Milam, Victoria, Williamson.
67	John T. Wilson	Bastrop, Bell, DeWitt, Fayette, Goliad, Gonzales, Jackson, Karnes, Lavaca, Lee, Milam, Victoria, Williamson.
68	John Sharp	All of Aransas, Bastrop, Caldwell, Calhoun, DeWitt, Fayette, Goliad, Gonzales, Jackson, Karnes, Lavaca, Lee, Matagorda, Refugio, Victoria. Portions of Brazoria, Fort Bend, Williamson.
69	John Sharp	All of Aransas, Bastrop, Caldwell, Calhoun, DeWitt, Fayette, Goliad, Gonzales, Jackson, Karnes, Lavaca, Lee, Matagorda, Refugio, Victoria. Portions of Brazoria, Fort Bend, Williamson.
70	Ken Armbrister	All of Aransas, Bastrop, Caldwell, Calhoun, DeWitt, Fayette, Goliad, Gonzales, Jackson, Karnes, Lavaca, Lee, Matagorda, Refugio, Victoria. Portions of Brazoria, Fort Bend, Williamson.
71	Ken Armbrister	All of Aransas, Bastrop, Caldwell, Calhoun, DeWitt, Fayette, Goliad, Gonzales, Jackson, Karnes, Lavaca, Lee, Matagorda, Refugio, Victoria. Portions of Brazoria, Fort Bend, Williamson.
72	Ken Armbrister	All of Aransas, Bastrop, Caldwell, Calhoun, DeWitt, Fayette, Goliad, Gonzales, Jackson, Karnes, Lavaca, Lee, Matagorda, Refugio, Victoria. Portions of Brazoria, Fort Bend, Williamson.
73	Ken Armbrister	All of Aransas, Austin, Bastrop, Caldwell, Calhoun, Colorado, DeWitt, Fayette, Goliad, Gonzales, Jackson, Karnes, Lavaca, Matagorda, Refugio, Victoria, Wharton. Portions of Fort Bend, Hays.
74	Ken Armbrister	All of Aransas, Austin, Bastrop, Caldwell, Calhoun, Colorado, DeWitt, Fayette, Goliad, Gonzales, Jackson, Karnes, Lavaca, Matagorda, Refugio, Victoria, Wharton. Portions of Fort Bend, Guadalupe, Hays.
75	Ken Armbrister	All of Aransas, Austin, Bastrop, Caldwell, Calhoun, Colorado, DeWitt, Fayette, Goliad, Gonzales, Jackson, Karnes, Lavaca, Matagorda, Refugio, Victoria, Wharton. Portions of Fort Bend, Guadalupe, Hays.
76	Ken Armbrister	All of Aransas, Austin, Bastrop, Caldwell, Calhoun, Colorado, DeWitt, Fayette, Goliad, Gonzales, Jackson, Karnes, Lavaca, Matagorda, Refugio, Victoria, Wharton. Portions of Fort Bend, Guadalupe, Hays.
77	Ken Armbrister	All of Aransas, Austin, Bastrop, Caldwell, Calhoun, Colorado, DeWitt, Fayette, Goliad, Gonzales, Jackson, Karnes, Lavaca, Matagorda, Refugio, Victoria, Wharton. Portions of Fort Bend, Guadalupe, Hays.
78	Ken Armbrister	All of Aransas, Austin, Bastrop, Caldwell, Calhoun, Colorado, DeWitt, Fayette, Goliad, Gonzales, Jackson, Lavaca, Matagorda, Refugio, Victoria, Waller, Washington, Wharton. Portion of Fort Bend.
79	Ken Armbrister	All of Aransas, Austin, Bastrop, Caldwell, Calhoun, Colorado, DeWitt, Fayette, Goliad, Gonzales, Jackson, Lavaca, Matagorda, Refugio, Victoria, Waller, Washington, Wharton. Portion of Fort Bend.
80	Glenn Hegar	All of Aransas, Austin, Bastrop, Caldwell, Calhoun, Colorado, DeWitt, Fayette, Goliad, Gonzales, Jackson, Lavaca, Matagorda, Refugio, Victoria, Waller, Washington, Wharton. Portion of Fort Bend.
81	Glenn Hegar	All of Aransas, Austin, Bastrop, Caldwell, Calhoun, Colorado, DeWitt, Fayette, Goliad, Gonzales, Jackson, Lavaca, Matagorda, Refugio, Victoria, Waller, Washington, Wharton. Portion of Fort Bend.
82	Glenn Hegar	All of Aransas, Austin, Bastrop, Caldwell, Calhoun, Colorado, DeWitt, Fayette, Goliad, Gonzales, Jackson, Lavaca, Matagorda, Refugio, Victoria, Waller, Washington, Wharton. Portion of Fort Bend.
83	Glenn Hegar; Lois Kolkhorst	Aransas, Austin, Burleson, Calhoun, Colorado, DeWitt, Fayette, Goliad, Gonzales, Jackson, Lavaca, Lee, Matagorda, Refugio, Victoria, Waller, Washington, Wharton. Portions of Harris, Fort Bend, Nueces.
84	Lois Kolkhorst	Aransas, Austin, Burleson, Calhoun, Colorado, DeWitt, Fayette, Goliad, Gonzales, Jackson, Lavaca, Lee, Matagorda, Refugio, Victoria, Waller, Washington, Wharton. Portions of Harris, Fort Bend, Nueces.
85	Lois Kolkhorst	Aransas, Austin, Burleson, Calhoun, Colorado, DeWitt, Fayette, Goliad, Gonzales, Jackson, Lavaca, Lee, Matagorda, Refugio, Victoria, Waller, Washington, Wharton. Portions of Harris, Fort Bend, Nueces.
86	Lois Kolkhorst	Aransas, Austin, Burleson, Calhoun, Colorado, DeWitt, Fayette, Goliad, Gonzales, Jackson, Lavaca, Lee, Matagorda, Refugio, Victoria, Waller, Washington, Wharton. Portions of Harris, Fort Bend, Nueces.
87	Lois Kolkhorst	Aransas, Austin, Burleson, Calhoun, Colorado, DeWitt, Fayette, Goliad, Gonzales, Jackson, Lavaca, Lee, Matagorda, Refugio, Victoria, Waller, Washington, Wharton. Portions of Harris, Fort Bend, Nueces.
88	Lois Kolkhorst	Aransas, Austin, Burleson, Calhoun, DeWitt, Fayette, Goliad, Gonzales, Grimes, Lavaca, Lee, Refugio, Victoria, Washington. Portions of Fort Bend, Harris, Montgomery, Waller.
89	Lois Kolkhorst	Aransas, Austin, Burleson, Calhoun, DeWitt, Fayette, Goliad, Gonzales, Grimes, Lavaca, Lee, Refugio, Victoria, Washington. Portions of Fort Bend, Harris, Montgomery, Waller.
