= 2002 Texas lieutenant gubernatorial election =

- November 5, 2002
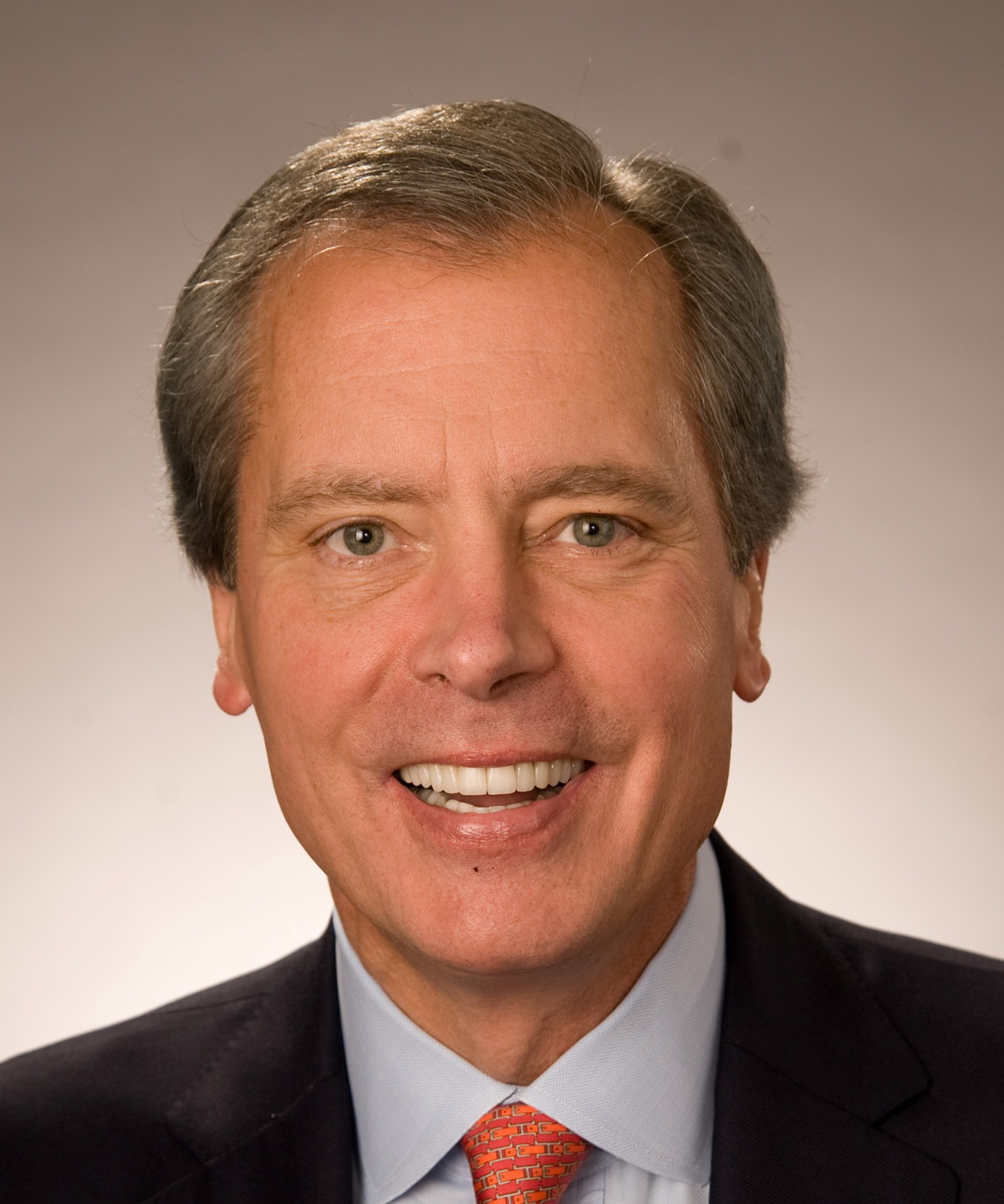

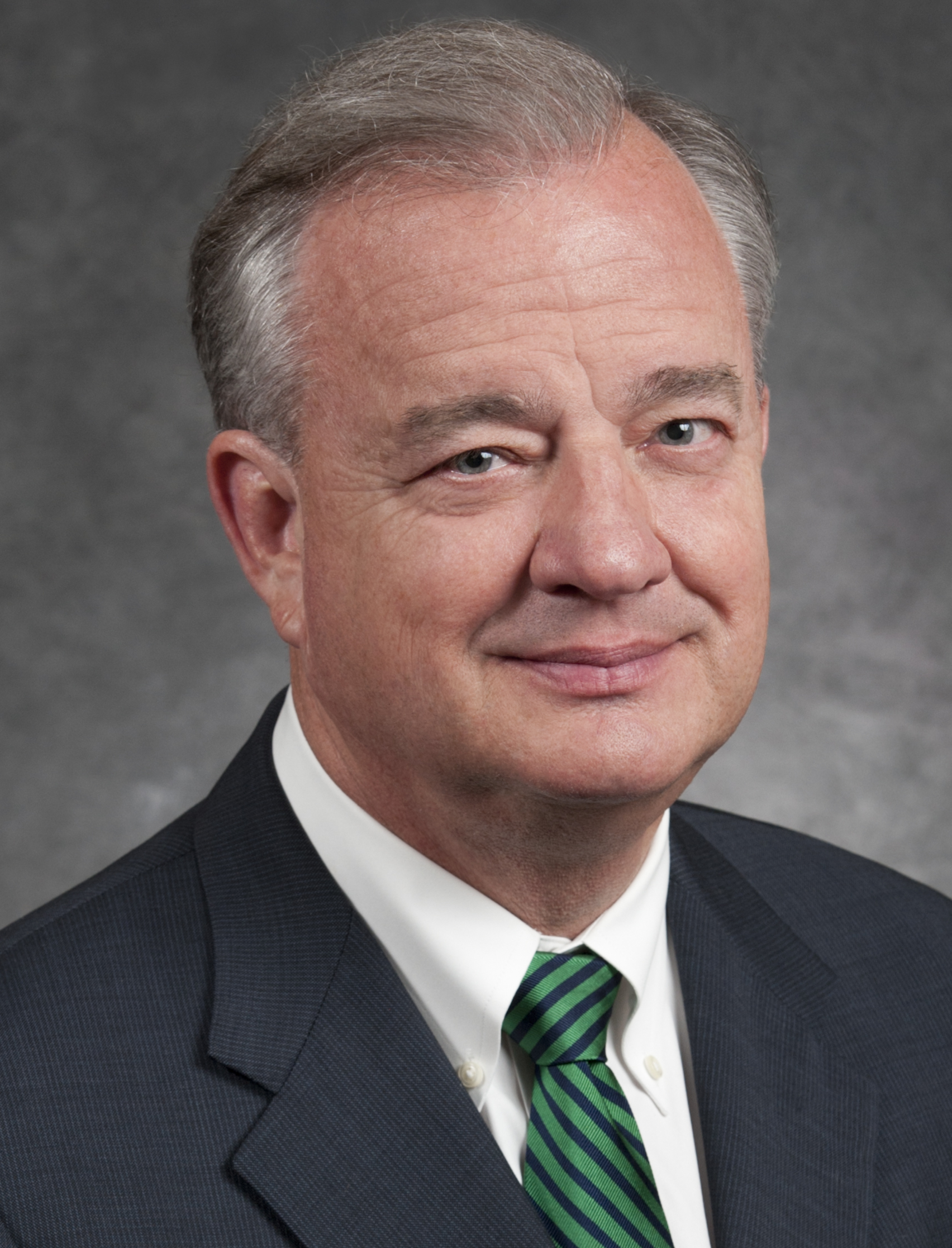
Nominee	David Dewhurst	John Sharp
Party	Republican	Democratic
Popular vote	2,341,785	2,082,281
Percentage	51.8%	46.0%
- County results Dewhurst: 40–50% 50–60% 60–70% 70–80% Sharp: 40–50% 50–60% 60–70% 70–80% 80–90%
Lieutenant Governor before election
Bill Ratliff (Note: Ratliff succeeded Rick Perry after he became governor when George W. Bush ascended to the presidency.)
Republican
Elected Lieutenant Governor
David Dewhurst
Republican

The 2002 Texas lieutenant gubernatorial election was held on November 5, 2002, to elect the Lieutenant Governor of Texas. The Incumbent, Bill Ratliff did not run for re-election. The Republican, Incumbent Land Commissioner; David Dewhurst was elected against former Democratic Comptroller; John Sharp. Dewhurst became the third Republican to be elected as lieutenant governor.

== Primaries ==
Republican primary results
Party	Candidate	Votes	%
Republican	David Dewhurst	492,366	78.52
Republican	Tom Kelly	134,702	21.48
Total votes		627,068	100.00

Democratic primary results
Party	Candidate	Votes	%
Democratic	John Sharp	732,366	100.00
Total votes		732,366	100.00

== General election results ==
General election results
Party	Candidate	Votes	%
Republican	David Dewhurst	2,341,875	51.77
Democratic	John Sharp	2,082,281	46.03
Libertarian	Mark David Gessner	54,885	1.21
Green	Nathalie Paravicini	44,386	0.98
Total votes		4,523,427	100.00
Republican hold			
