= Salman Bhojani =

American politician (born 1980)

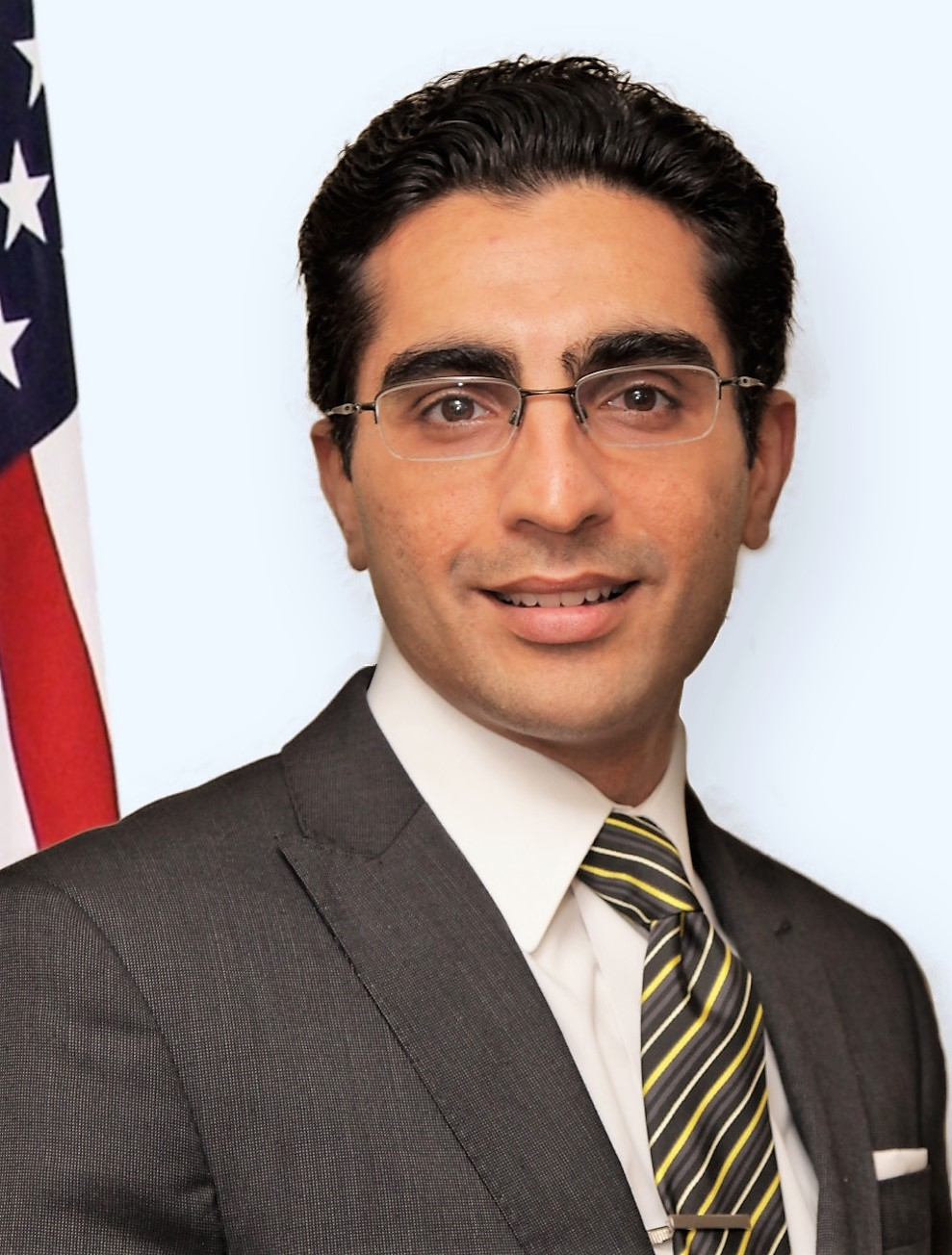

Member of the Texas House of Representatives from the 92nd district
- Incumbent
- Assumed office January 10, 2023
- Preceded by: Jeff Cason

Personal details
- Born: February 18, 1980 (age 46) Pakistan
- Party: Democratic
- Spouse: Nima (m. 2004)
- Children: 2
- Education: University of Texas at Dallas (BS); Southern Methodist University (JD)
- Website: Campaign website

Salman Bhojani (born February 18, 1980) is an American corporate lawyer and politician who is a former member of the City Council of Euless, Texas. He was the first Muslim American to hold elected office in Euless. In October 2021 Bhojani announced his candidacy for the Texas House of Representatives. He was elected to the Texas House in November 2022, becoming one of the first Muslims and Pakistani elected to the Texas Legislature.

== Early life and education ==
Bhojani was born in Pakistan and lived there until the age of 10. He is an Ismaili Muslim. In 1990, his family immigrated to Montreal, Quebec, Canada where he completed primary and secondary school. In 1999, Bhojani moved with his parents to Carrollton, Texas. In 2000, he enrolled at the University of Texas at Dallas, earning a Bachelor of Science degree in business administration in 2003. During and after his studies, Bhojani worked at convenience stores and gas stations. In 2003, he became the owner of a gas station and convenience store, acquiring more properties around the Dallas–Fort Worth metroplex in the following years. He moved to Bedford, Texas, in 2007 and then to neighboring Euless in 2010.

In 2009, Bhojani enrolled in the evening program at the Dedman School of Law at Southern Methodist University in Dallas. He received his Juris Doctor in 2013 and was admitted to the State Bar of Texas.

== Career ==
Bhojani worked for Haynes and Boone at the firm's Dallas headquarters from 2013 to 2015, practicing corporate law. In 2015, he left Haynes and Boone to found Bhojani Law, PLLC, a firm specializing in real estate law, corporate law and estate planning, with offices in Irving, Texas.

Bhojani was appointed to the Euless Parks & Leisure Services Board in 2014. In May 2017, he ran for Place 2 on Euless City Council, earning 43.1% of the vote in a three-candidate race won by incumbent Jeremy Tompkins with 54.6% of the vote. In May 2018, Bhojani ran for Place 6 on Euless City Council, an open seat. He won 50.4% of the vote, defeating his opponent Molly Maddux by 37 votes out of 4,203 votes cast. This election saw the highest voter turnout in a Euless municipal election since 1993.

This campaign earned local and national press coverage when Maddux sent a mailer to Euless voters highlighting Bhojani's Muslim faith and Republican State Representative Jonathan Stickland posted on Facebook calling Bhojani "sneaky," "a Muslim, lawyer, and a lifelong Democrat" with "ideas for our community [that] would scare a majority of our residents." Stickland, whose district includes Euless, contributed $5,000 to the Maddux campaign and donated political consulting, canvassing services and postage worth an additional $7,909. Stickland's comments were condemned on the editorial pages of The Dallas Morning News and the Fort Worth Star-Telegram and in a press release by the interfaith group Faith in Texas.

Bhojani was sworn in as councilman on May 22, 2018, and presented with a ceremonial gavel by Texas State Rep. Rafael Anchia on behalf of Joe Straus, speaker of the Texas House of Representatives. Upon his election, Bhojani became the first non-white minority elected official in Euless history.

In January 2021, Bhojani announced that he would not seek reelection to Euless City Council. His term on Euless City Council ended in June 2021. In October 2021, he announced that he would be running for the Texas House of Representatives. Bhojani was elected to the state house in November 2022.
