= Jeff Cason =

American businessman and politician (born 1953)

Member of the Texas House of Representatives from the 92nd district
- In office January 12, 2021 – January 10, 2023
- Preceded by: Jonathan Stickland
- Succeeded by: Salman Bhojani

Personal details
- Born: Jeffrey Harold Cason; April 10, 1953 (age 73)
- Party: Republican
- Spouse: Wendy
- Children: 5
- Occupation: Businessman
- Website: https://jeffcason.com/

Jeffrey Harold Cason (born April 10, 1953) is an American businessman and politician who served a single term in the Texas House of Representatives from January 2021 to January 2023. A member of the Republican Party, he was elected from District 92.

== Career ==
Cason was a member of the Bedford, Texas city council. After leaving the council, he unsuccessfully ran against state Representative Todd Smith of Euless in the 2010 Republican primary election.

Cason was a sales manager for Höganäs AB and H.C. Starck GmbH. After retiring, Cason was elected to the Texas House of Representatives in November 2020 and assumed office on January 4, 2021. He was assigned to the County Affairs Committee and Criminal Jurisprudence Committees.

In the state House, Cason was among the most conservative members, although, like fellow hardline right-winger Bryan Slaton, he chose not to join the House Freedom Caucus. As a freshman representative, Cason rebelled on his first vote, by voting against Republican Dade Phelan as speaker of the House. Phelan was elected on a 143–2 vote. Cason, who was among the chamber's most conservative members, objected to Phelan's plan to appoint Democrats to chair some committees. This act, as well as Cason repeatedly forcing recorded votes after voice votes, alienated him from Republican leaders, and in the redistricting cycle, his heavily Republican district centered on Hurst-Euless-Bedford was redrawn to a majority Democratic seat.

In April 2021, during a debate on legislation to allow handguns to be carried without a permit, Cason offered an amendment to lowered the minimum age for permitless carry from 21 to 18 years. Cason's amendment failed overwhelmingly, with 12 representatives voting yes and 121 voting no. In May 2021, Cason voted for the Texas six-week abortion ban.

Cason did not seek reelection in 2022.

== Personal life ==
Cason lives in Bedford, Texas, with his wife, Wendy. Both had children from prior marriages.

Texas House of Representatives
| Preceded by Jonathan Stickland | Member of the Texas House of Representatives from the 92nd district 2021–2023 | Succeeded by Salman Bhojani |
