= John Wilson (Texas politician) =

American politician (1939–1982)

- Official portrait, 67th Legislature

Member of the Texas Senate from the 18th district
- In office January 13, 1981 – September 19, 1982
- Preceded by: Bill Patman
- Succeeded by: John Sharp

Member of the Texas House of Representatives from the 30th district
- In office January 9, 1973 – January 13, 1981

Personal details
- Born: September 7, 1939 La Grange, Texas, U.S.
- Died: September 19, 1982 (aged 43) Texas, U.S.
- Party: Democratic

John T. Wilson (September 7, 1939 – September 19, 1982) was a Texas politician from La Grange, Texas who served four terms in the Texas House of Representatives and one in the Texas Senate representing District 18. He was known for his work on energy matters. He died of lung cancer on September 19, 1982, at the age of 43. Two months later, he was re-elected despite being dead.

== Career ==
John Wilson was a rancher and businessman from La Grange, Texas. He was elected to the Texas House of Representatives in 1972 and served three additional terms, each time running unopposed. On January 13, 1980, during his fourth term in the Texas House of Representatives, Wilson announced a run for the Texas Senate. He won the race and served most of his term.

In 1975, he created the Public Utility Commission of Texas, which regulated utilities in the state of Texas. The Cameron Herald newspaper called the commission his “most notable legislative accomplishment”. Wilson sponsored the Texas Sunset Act which required 200 state agencies to prove that they were benefitting the public; agencies which failed to prove their effectiveness were abolished.

== Death ==
John Wilson died of lung cancer on September 19, 1982, one day after the statutory deadline for removing his name from the election ballot November 2. The Secretary of State David Dean disagreed with the State Democratic Executive Committee chair, C. R. Slagle III, over how to handle the situation, with Dean believing the deadline had passed and Slagle believing that Wilson's name could still be removed from the ballot.

Because the election would have gone to the Republican nominee Dr. J Everett Ware, voters were put in the unusual position of voting for a dead man. After Wilson won the election despite being dead, a special election was held to fill his upcoming role. Another election was held to finish the last two months of John Wilson's current term of office.

Spokesman Taber Ward from the Republican headquarters in Austin stated "There's no requirement in Texas for a candidate to be alive, except before the filing deadline."
