= Ken Armbrister =

American politician (born 1946)

Member of the Texas Senate from the 18th district
- In office 1987–2007
- Preceded by: John Sharp
- Succeeded by: Glenn Hegar

Member of the Texas House of Representatives from the 32nd district
- In office 1983–1987
- Preceded by: Bob Ware
- Succeeded by: Steve Holzheauser

Personal details
- Born: Kenneth L. Armbrister; June 19, 1946 (age 80)
- Party: Democratic
- Education: Sam Houston State University
- Website: Official website

Kenneth L. Armbrister (born June 19, 1946) is an American politician who was a Democratic member of the Texas Senate representing the 18th District from 1987 to 2007.

Armbrister was a Victoria, Texas police captain, and the vice president of the Victoria School Board when first elected as a Democrat to the Texas House of Representatives in 1983. After two terms in the house, he was elected to the Texas Senate in 1986, representing the 18th Senatorial District, which encompasses 18 counties and a portion of Fort Bend County in southeast Texas. During most of his time in the senate, Armbrister served on the senate committees on Natural Resources (chair, 2003–2005) and State Affairs (chair, 1993–1997). He authored the 1993 legislation that created the Edwards Aquifer Authority affecting a 16-county area of South Texas, and he later served on the Joint Committee on Oversight of the Edwards Aquifer (co-chair, 2003–2005), as well as on other water-related committees. He was named to the Texas Water Advisory Council in 2001 by Lt. Governor David Dewhurst. From 2003 to 2006 he was a member of the senate committees on Business and Commerce, and on Health and Human Services, and he served on the Transportation and Homeland Security committee from 2005 to 2006. Texas Governor Rick Perry appointed Senator Armbrister to the Task Force on Homeland Security in 2001, and to the Governor's Anti-Crime Commission in 2002.

Senator Armbrister graduated from Sam Houston State University and the FBI National Academy. During his 14-year career as a police officer, he rose to the rank of captain and served as the director of the Victoria Regional Police Academy. The College of Criminal Justice at Sam Houston State University honored Armbrister with its highest award, the Defensor Pacem, or Defender of Peace Award, for his achievements in law enforcement and his legislative record on crime issues. He was twice named as a Top Ten Crime Fighter by the Greater Dallas Crime Commission.

During his tenure in the legislature, Armbrister served as President Pro Tempore of the Senate, and as acting Governor. He chose not to run for re-election in 2006.

After serving 8 years as Texas Governor Rick Perry's Director of Legislative Affairs, Armbrister joined the Texas Star Alliance lobby group.

== Election history ==
Election history of Armbrister from 1992.

=== Most recent election ===
==== 2002 ====
Texas general election, 2002: Senate District 18
Party	Candidate	Votes	%	±%
Republican	Lester Phipps	72,296	45.13	+4.57
Democratic	Ken Armbrister (Incumbent)	85,401	53.31	−6.13
Libertarian	Horace Henley	2,508	1.57	+1.57
Majority		13,105	8.18	−10.70
Turnout		160,205		+11.65
Democratic hold				

Republican primary, 2002: Senate District 18
Candidate		Votes	%	±
✓	Lester Phipps	11,774	50.13	
	Michael Rozell	11,713	49.87	
Majority		61	0.26	
Turnout		23,487		

=== Previous elections ===
==== 1998 ====
Texas general election, 1998: Senate District 18
Party	Candidate	Votes	%	±%
Republican	Reese Turner	58,195	40.56	+40.56
Democratic	Ken Armbrister (Incumbent)	85,291	59.44	−40.56
Majority		27,096	18.88	−81.12
Turnout		143,486		+46.32
Democratic hold				

==== 1994 ====
Texas general election, 1994: Senate District 18
Party	Candidate	Votes	%	±%
Democratic	Ken Armbrister (Incumbent)	98,066	100.00	+40.34
Majority		98,066	100.00	+80.68
Turnout		98,066		−48.56
Democratic hold				

==== 1992 ====
Texas general election, 1992: Senate District 18
Party	Candidate	Votes	%	±%
Democratic	Ken Armbrister (Incumbent)	113,729	59.66	
Republican	Carolyn McDaniel	76,905	40.34	
Majority		6,824	19.32	
Turnout		190,634		
Democratic hold				

Preceded by Bob Ware	Member of the Texas House of Representatives from District 32 (Victoria); 1983–1987	Succeeded by Steve Holzheauser
Preceded by John Sharp	Texas State Senator from District 18 (Victoria); 1987–2007	Succeeded by Glenn Hegar
