= 1998 Texas lieutenant gubernatorial election =

- November 3, 1998
- Turnout: 35.2% (Note: Of registered voters.) ▼14.3%
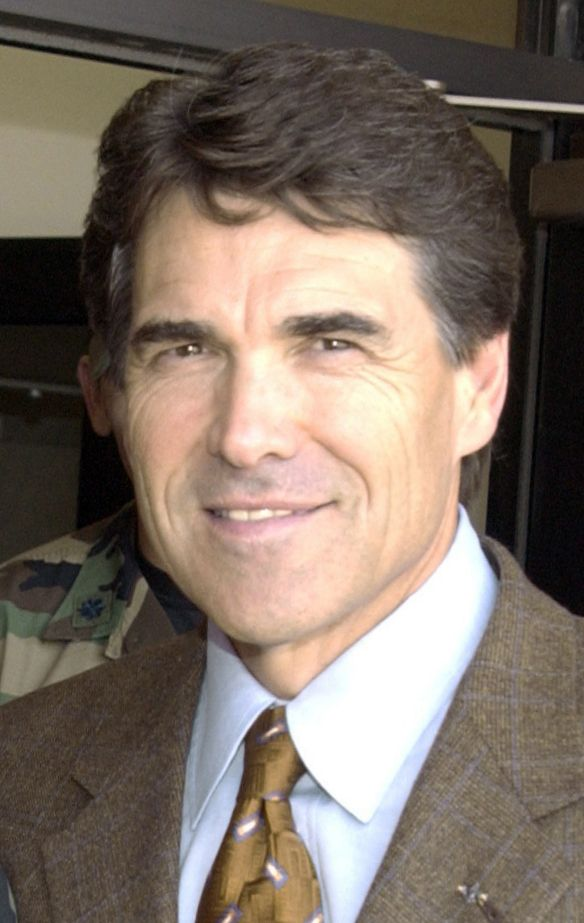

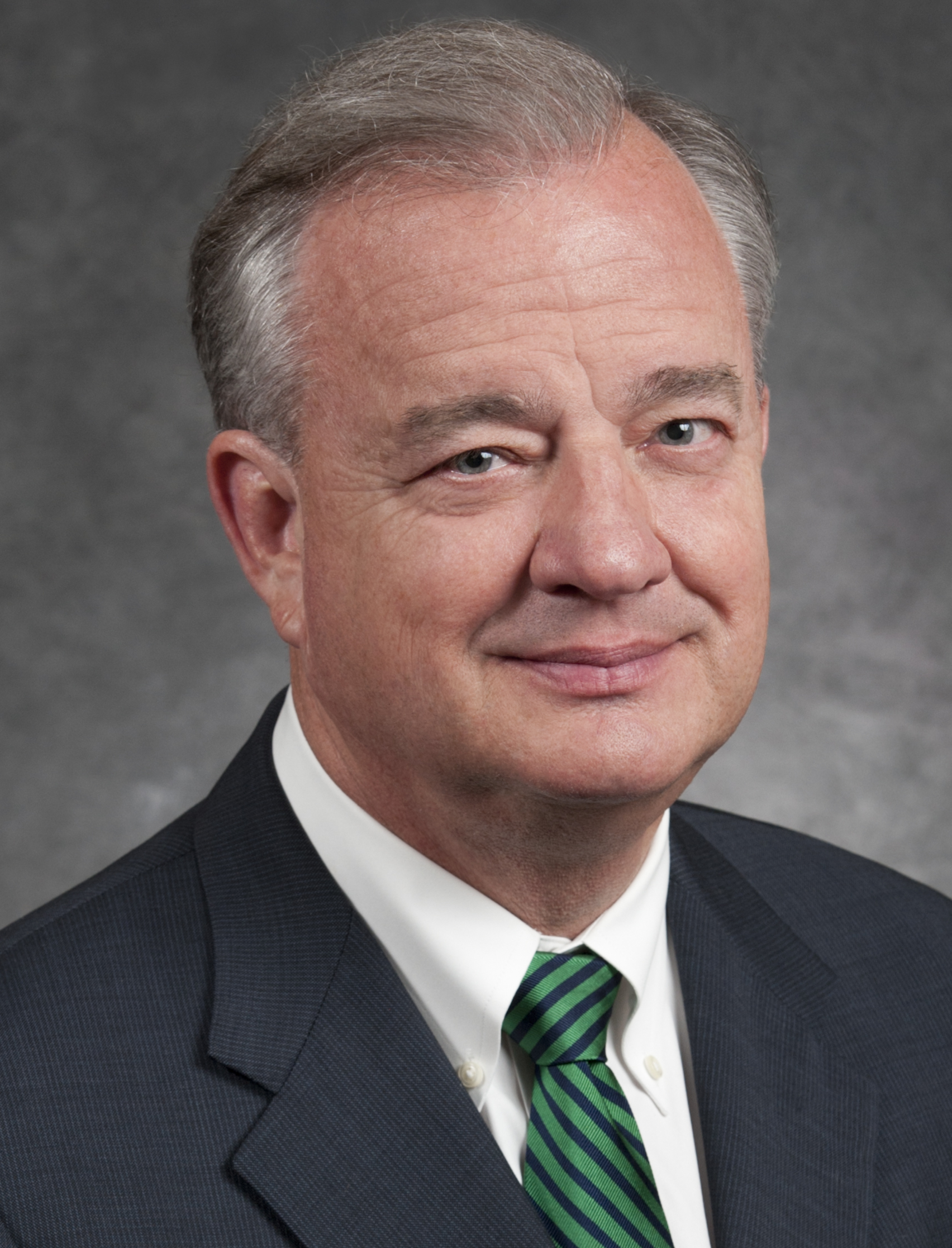
Nominee	Rick Perry	John Sharp
Party	Republican	Democratic
Popular vote	1,858,837	1,790,106
Percentage	50.0%	48.2%
- County results Perry: 40–50% 50–60% 60–70% 70–80% Sharp: 40–50% 50–60% 60–70% 70–80% 80–90%
Lieutenant Governor before election
Bob Bullock
Democratic
Elected Lieutenant Governor
Rick Perry
Republican

The 1998 Texas lieutenant gubernatorial election was held on November 3, 1998, to elect the Lieutenant Governor of Texas. The Incumbent, Bob Bullock did not run for re-election due to his declining health and advancing age. The Republican, Incumbent Agriculture Commissioner; Rick Perry was elected against incumbent Democratic Comptroller; John Sharp. Perry became the second Republican to be elected as lieutenant governor and the first to do so since 1869. The 1998 Texas elections saw massive gains for the Republican Party, who won all statewide offices for the first time. No Democrat won the lieutenant governor office until 2026.

== Primaries ==
Republican primary results
Party	Candidate	Votes	%
Republican	Rick Perry	448,927	100.0
Total votes		448,927	100.0

Democratic primary results
Party	Candidate	Votes	%
Democratic	John Sharp	510,835	100.00
Total votes		510,835	100.00

== General election results ==
General election results
Party	Candidate	Votes	%
Republican	Rick Perry	1,858,837	50.05
Democratic	John Sharp	1,790,106	48.20
Libertarian	Anthony Garcia	65,150	1.75
Total votes		3,714,093	100.00
Republican gain from Democratic			
