= Glenn Hegar =

American politician (born 1970)

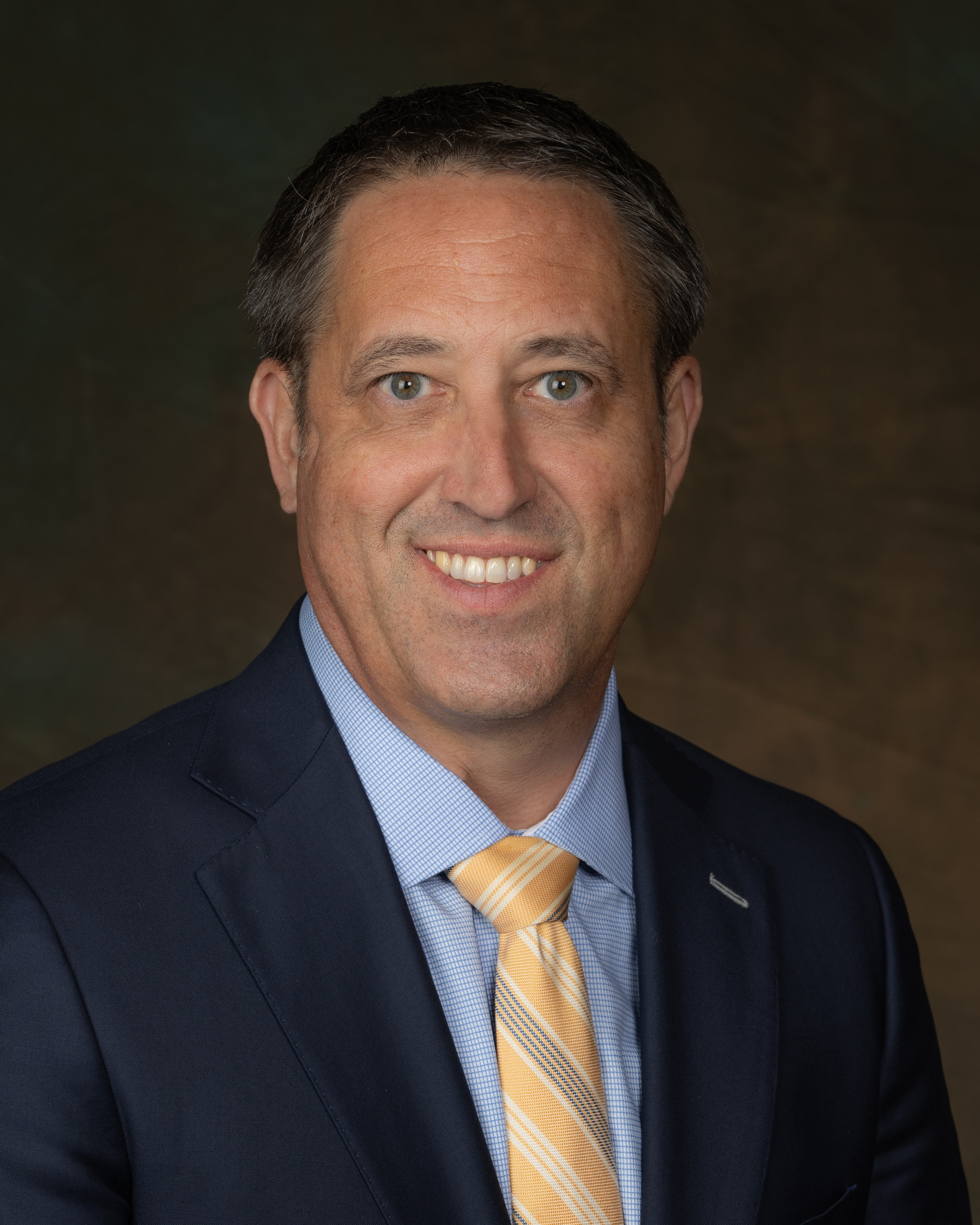
- Official portrait, 2025

Chancellor of the Texas A&M University System
- Incumbent
- Assumed office July 1, 2025
- Preceded by: John Sharp

38th Comptroller of Texas
- In office January 2, 2015 – July 1, 2025
- Governor: Rick Perry; Greg Abbott
- Preceded by: Susan Combs
- Succeeded by: Kelly Hancock (acting)

Member of the Texas Senate from the 18th district
- In office January 2007 – December 5, 2014
- Preceded by: Ken Armbrister
- Succeeded by: Lois Kolkhorst

Member of the Texas House of Representatives from the 28th district
- In office January 2003 – January 2007
- Preceded by: Robby Cook
- Succeeded by: John Zerwas

Personal details
- Born: Glenn Allen Hegar Jr. November 25, 1970 (age 55) Houston, Texas, U.S.
- Party: Republican
- Spouse: Dara Hegar
- Children: 3
- Education: Texas A&M University (BA); St. Mary's University, Texas (MA, JD); University of Arkansas (LLM)
- Website: Office of the Chancellor

Glenn Allen Hegar Jr. (born November 25, 1970) is an American attorney who has served as the Chancellor of the Texas A&M University System since 2025. A member of the Republican Party, he previously served as the Texas Comptroller of Public Accounts from 2015 to 2025. He also served in both chambers of the Texas Legislature from 2003 to 2014.

Hegar gained prominence in 2022 as the gatekeeper to the Texas's $330 billion in investment assets, following a letter he sent to more than 100 of the world's largest financial firms demanding that they make clear whether they restrict business with the fossil-fuel industry. If so, they would risk getting shut out of working with the fastest-growing US state.

On March 7, 2025, Hegar was selected by the Board of Regents of the Texas A&M University System as the lone finalist for the system's chancellor. The board formally approved him in a unanimous vote on April 2, 2025. On July 1, Hegar succeeded retiring chancellor, John Sharp.

== Texas Legislature ==
Hegar was elected to the Texas House in 2002 and served in District 28. He won re-election in 2004.

He was elected to the Texas Senate in 2006 and was re-elected in 2010 and 2012. Hegar resigned from the Senate on December 5, 2014, after his election as Texas Comptroller.

== Texas State Comptroller ==
=== 2014 election ===
Hegar faced three opponents for the Republican nomination for state comptroller: State Representative Harvey Hilderbran of Kerrville, Debra Medina of Wharton, an activist with the Tea Party movement, and former State Representative Raul Torres of Corpus Christi. Hegar finished with 610,512 votes (49.99 percent), but Hildebran opted to forgo a runoff election, thus giving Hegar the party's nomination. Hilderbran polled 317,731 votes (26.01 percent). Debra Medina finished third with 235,713 votes (19.3 percent), and Raul Torres polled 57,255 votes (4.7 percent).

Hegar, with 58.4 percent of the vote, defeated the Democratic nominee Mike Collier, a businessman from Houston, in the November 4 general election.

=== 2018 election ===
Hegar was unopposed in the 2018 Republican primary and won election to a second term in the 2018 general election.

In 2021, Hegar proposed to weaken the rules for transparency and accountability for the biggest corporate tax break program in Texas., Chapter 313.

=== 2022 election ===
Hegar faced Mark V. Goloby in the primary but won easily, then won election to a third term in the 2022 general election by a larger margin than in the 2018 election.

== Political positions ==
Hegar is a conservative, who says he seeks to defend "the values of faith, family, and freedom".

Hegar opposes abortion. Texas Right to Life awarded him the "Perfectly Pro-Life Award". In the 83rd Legislative Session in 2013, Hegar was the author of Texas Senate Bill 5 and introduced the bill into the Senate. The Texas House passed the bill on July 10, 2013, by a 96–49 margin and sent the measure to the Texas Senate. The Texas Senate passed the bill on July 13, 2013, with a bipartisan vote of nineteen to eleven. The bill was signed by Governor Rick Perry on July 18, 2013. The bill was a list of measures that would add and update abortion regulations in Texas. Major sections of the law were struck down in the United States Supreme Court case Whole Woman’s Health v. Hellerstedt.

Under the advice and direction of Texas Attorney General Ken Paxton, Hegar twice denied the compensation to Dewayne Brown for wrongful conviction despite a court ruling of him being innocent. However, the office did proceed with payment after the Texas Supreme Court ruled that the Comptrollers office did not have the authority to deny the payment.

== Chancellor of the Texas A&M University-System ==
On July 1, 2024, Texas A&M University System (TAMUS) Chancellor John Sharp announced his retirement in a letter submitted to the system's Board of Regents. Following an extensive search, the Board of Regents unanimously approved Hegar as the lone finalist to become the system's next chancellor.

Following the vote, Board of Regents chair Bill Mahomes said in a statement: “The Board is confident that Glenn Hegar is ready to usher in the next era of excellence at The Texas A&M University System, Hegar grasps the unique breadth and depth of the System’s impact on every corner of Texas through its eight state agencies and 11 universities. We, as members of the Board of Regents, are eager to see what he will accomplish.”

Hegar took office on July 1, 2025.

== Election history ==
=== 2022 ===
2022 Texas Comptroller general election
Party	Candidate	Votes	%	±%
Republican	Glenn Hegar	4,496,319	56.39	+4.19
Democratic	Janet T. Dudding	3,265,069	40.95	−2.45
Libertarian	V. Alonzo Echevarria-Garza	212,205	2.66	−0.74
Majority		1,231,250	15.44	+5.64
Total votes		7,973,593	100.00	
Republican hold				

2022 Texas Comptroller Republican primary
Party	Candidate	Votes	%
Republican	Glenn Hegar	1,386,782	81.69
Republican	Mark V. Goloby	310,829	18.31
Majority		1,075,953	63.38
Total votes		1,697,611	100.00

=== 2018 ===
Hegar was unopposed in the 2018 Texas Republican Primary election.

2018 Texas Comptroller general election
Party	Candidate	Votes	%
Republican	Glenn Hegar	4,356,562	53.2
Democratic	Joi Chevalier	3,548,034	43.4
Libertarian	Ben Sanders	279,676	3.4
Majority		808,528	9.8
Total votes		8,184,272	100.00
Republican hold			

=== 2014 ===
2014 Texas Comptroller general election
Party	Candidate	Votes	%	±%
Republican	Glenn Hegar	2,698,682	58.38	−24.78
Democratic	Mike Collier	1,742,250	37.69	N/A
Libertarian	Ben Sanders	136,884	2.96	−7.54
Green	Deb Shafto	44,985	0.97	−5.37
Majority		956,432	20.69	−51.97
Total votes		4,622,801	100.00	
Republican hold				

2014 Texas Comptroller Republican primary
Party	Candidate	Votes	%
Republican	Glenn Hegar	612,269	49.99
Republican	Harvey Hilderbran	318,899	26.04
Republican	Debra Medina	236,531	19.31
Republican	Raul Torres	56,937	4.65
Majority		293,370	23.96
Total votes		1,224,636	100.00

NOTE: Hildebran opted to forgo the runoff election; thus, Hegar advanced to the general election as the Republican nominee.

=== 2010 ===
Texas general election, 2010: Senate District 18
Party	Candidate	Votes	%	±%
Republican	Glenn Hegar	146,087	70.43	−8.49
Democratic	Patricia "Pat" Olney	61,345	29.57	n/a
Majority		84,742	40.86	−16.99
Total votes		207,432	100.00	
Republican hold				

=== 2006 ===
Texas general election, 2006: Senate District 18
Party	Candidate	Votes	%	±%
Republican	Glenn Hegar	110,512	78.92	+33.80
Libertarian	Roy O. Wright, II	29,511	21.08	+19.51
Majority		81,001	57.85	+49.67
Total votes		140,023	100.00	-12.60
Republican gain from Democratic				

Republican primary, 2006: Senate District 18
Party	Candidate	Votes	%
Republican	Glenn Hegar	19,934	54.92
Republican	Gary Gates	12,933	35.63
Republican	David Stall	3,428	9.44
Majority		7,001	19.29
Total votes		36,295	100.00

== Personal life ==
Born to teenage parents, Hegar is a sixth-generation Texan who farms on the 4,000-acre (1,600 ha) land that has been in his family since the mid-19th century. He grew up in Hockley, also in Harris County. Hegar met his wife Dara while attending St. Mary's University. He with his wife Dara, and their three children live in Katy, where they attend St. Peter's United Methodist Church. Hegar highlighted his wife and children in most of his television commercials in the race for comptroller.

Party political offices
Preceded by Susan Combs	Republican nominee for Comptroller of Texas; 2014, 2018, 2022	Succeeded by Don Huffines
Political offices
Preceded by Susan Combs	Comptroller of Texas; 2015–2025	Succeeded by Kelly Hancock; Acting
