= David Dunn (musician) =

American musician

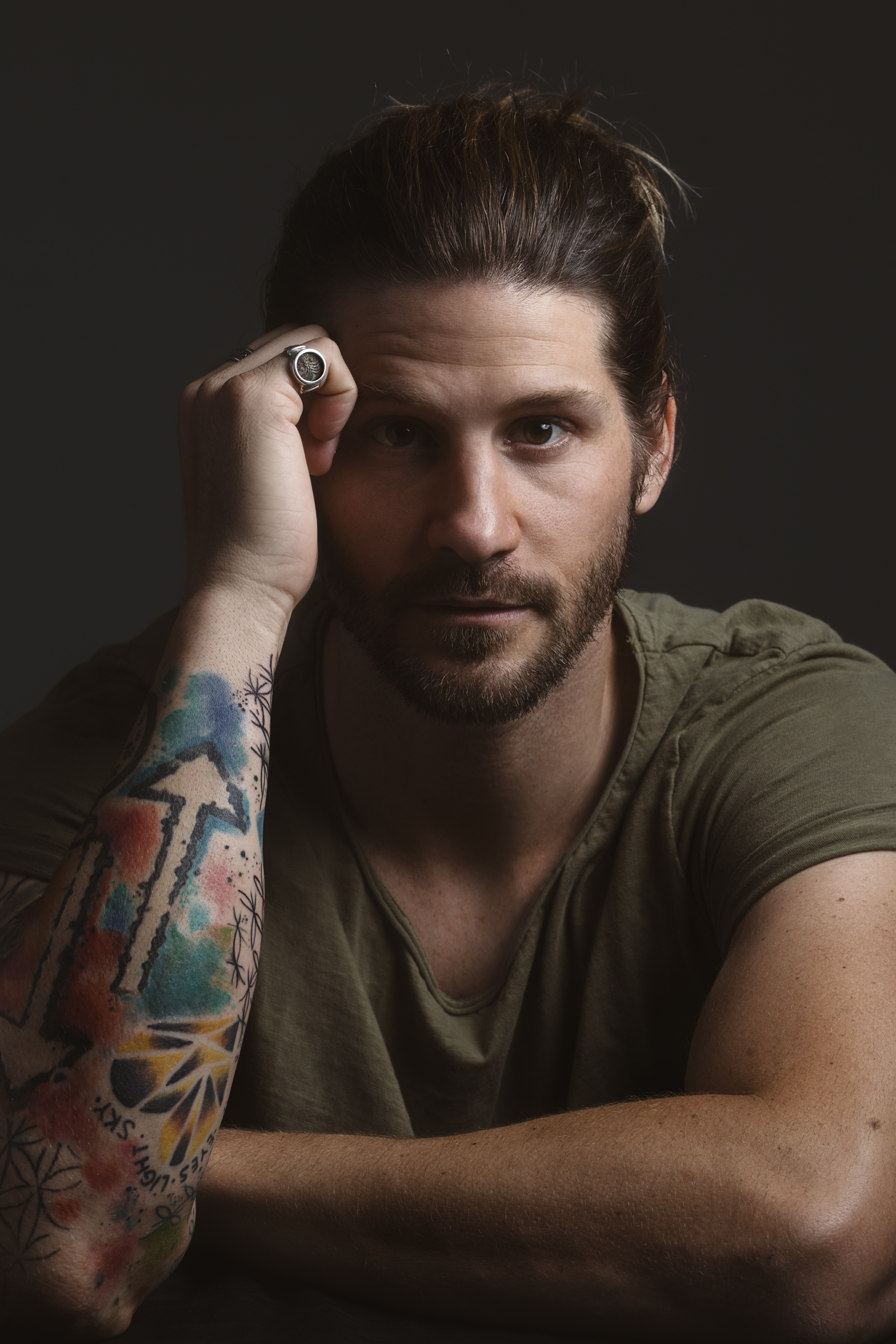
- David Dunn 2016 Press Photo

Background information
- Born: David Timothy Dunn; Midland, Texas
- Genres: Contemporary Christian music
- Occupation: Singer-songwriter
- Instrument: Guitar
- Years active: 2009–present
- Label: BEC
- Website: www.daviddunnmusic.com

David Timothy Dunn is an American musician. A singer-songwriter, he appeared on season two of NBC's The Voice. Dunn is a contemporary Christian artist. He is signed to BEC Recordings.

== Early life ==
David Timothy Dunn was born in Midland, Texas, to father Tim Dunn and mother Terri Lee Dunn (née, Spannaus). He studied engineering at Texas Tech University. He graduated with honors. While in college, he got his start as an acoustic singer-songwriter. He recorded his first album during his senior year before leaving to go to Africa for a year-long humanitarian trip.

Dunn appeared on the second season of NBC's The Voice. He lives in Nashville, Tennessee.

== Personal life ==
Dunn married his girlfriend, Leen, on July 12, 2017.

== Discography ==
Year	Title	Record label	US Christian
2009	David Dunn - EP	Catapult	—
2012	This Is Christmas - EP	Catapult	—
2012	For the Life of Me	Catapult	—
2014	Crystal Clear (EP)	BEC Recordings	48
2015	Crystal Clear	BEC	—
2017	Yellow Balloons	BEC	41
2020	Perspectives	BEC/Tooth & Nail	—
2023	Boys	BEC/Tooth & Nail	—

== Singles ==
Title	Year	Album	Peak chart positions		
Title	Year	Album	US Christ.	US Christ. Airplay	US Christ. AC
"Ship Go Down"	2009	David Dunn - EP	—		—
"Divine Explanation"	2009	David Dunn - EP	—		—
"Today Is Beautiful"	2014	Crystal Clear	25	16	18
"Have Everything"	2015	Crystal Clear	30	22	21
"Ready to Be Myself"	2015	Crystal Clear	48	27	—
"I Wanna Go Back"	2017	Yellow Balloons	13	2	10
"Overwhelming"	2017	Non-album single	—	41	—
"Grace Will Lead Me Home"	2018	Yellow Balloons	—	45	—
"Spend A Life"	2019	Perspectives	—	36	—
"The Human Condition"	2019	Perspectives	—	—	—
"Yes & No"	2019	Perspectives	—	39	—
"—" denotes a single that did not chart or was not released in that territory.

== Music videos ==
List of music videos, showing year released and directors
Title	Year	Director(s)
"Ship Go Down"	2009	David Dunn
"Divine Explanation"	2009	David Dunn
"Today Is Beautiful"	2015	Steven Worster
"Have Everything" (Lyric Video)	2015	Ben Batwell
"Ready to Be Myself" (Official Lyric Video)	2015	Ben Boutwell
"I Wanna Go Back"	2016	Ben Boutwell
"Overwhelming" (Official Lyric Video)	2017	BEC Recordings
"Grace Will Lead Me Home"	2018	Ben Boutwell
"—" denotes a single that did not chart or was not released in that territory.
