= Bill Patman =

American politician (1927–2008)

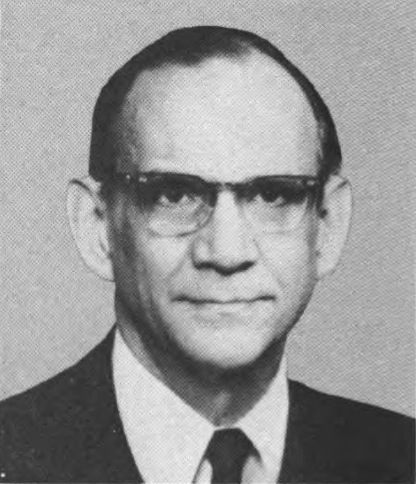

Member of the U.S. House of Representatives from Texas's 14th district
- In office January 3, 1981 – January 3, 1985
- Preceded by: Joseph P. Wyatt, Jr.
- Succeeded by: Mac Sweeney

Member of the Texas Senate from the 18th district
- In office January 10, 1961 – January 3, 1981
- Preceded by: William S. Fly
- Succeeded by: John Wilson

Personal details
- Born: William Neff Patman; March 26, 1927 Texarkana, Texas, U.S.
- Died: December 9, 2008 (aged 81) Houston, Texas, U.S.
- Party: Democratic
- Spouse: Carrin Mauritz (m. 1953)
- Children: Carrin Patman
- Parent: Wright Patman (father)
- Education: University of Texas at Austin (LLB)

Military service
- Branch/service: United States Marine Corps (1945–1946); United States Air Force (1953–1966)

William Neff Patman (March 26, 1927 – December 9, 2008) was an American politician who served from 1981 to 1985 as a Democratic member of the United States House of Representatives for Texas's 14th congressional district. He was the son of Wright Patman, who served in the U.S. House from 1929 to 1976.

== Early life and education ==
Patman was born in Texarkana, Texas. He attended public schools there and in Washington, D.C. He then attended the now-closed Kemper Military School in Boonville, Missouri, graduating in 1944. Patman graduated in 1953 from the University of Texas at Austin. Later that year, he was admitted to the State Bar of Texas and served as a legal examiner for the Texas Railroad Commission until 1955.

== Career ==
He served in the United States Marine Corps as a private first class from 1945 to 1946. He subsequently served in the United States Air Force Reserve as a captain from 1953 to 1966. He was a diplomatic courier for the United States Foreign Service from 1949 to 1950. He served as the city attorney for Ganado, Texas from 1955 to 1960. He died of cancer in Houston, Texas on December 9 2008 he was 81 years old.

=== Texas Senate ===
In 1960, Patman successfully sought the district 18 seat in the Texas State Senate. He took office the following year and served until 1981. He was a delegate to state Democratic Party conventions during this senatorial tenure. When President John F. Kennedy was assassinated, Patman was in the fifteenth vehicle of the motorcade.

In 1979, Patman was a member of the Killer Bees, the group of twelve quorum-busting Democratic senators that hid out in an Austin garage apartment for 4½ days.

=== U.S. House of Representatives ===
In 1980, he was elected to the District 14 seat in the United States House of Representatives.

U.S. House of Representatives
Preceded by Joseph P. Wyatt, Jr.	Member of the U.S. House of Representatives from Texas's 14th congressional district 1981–1985	Succeeded by Mac Sweeney
Political offices
Preceded by William S. Fly	Texas State Senator from District 18; 1961–1981	Succeeded by John T. Wilson
