= Lois Kolkhorst =

American businesswoman and politician

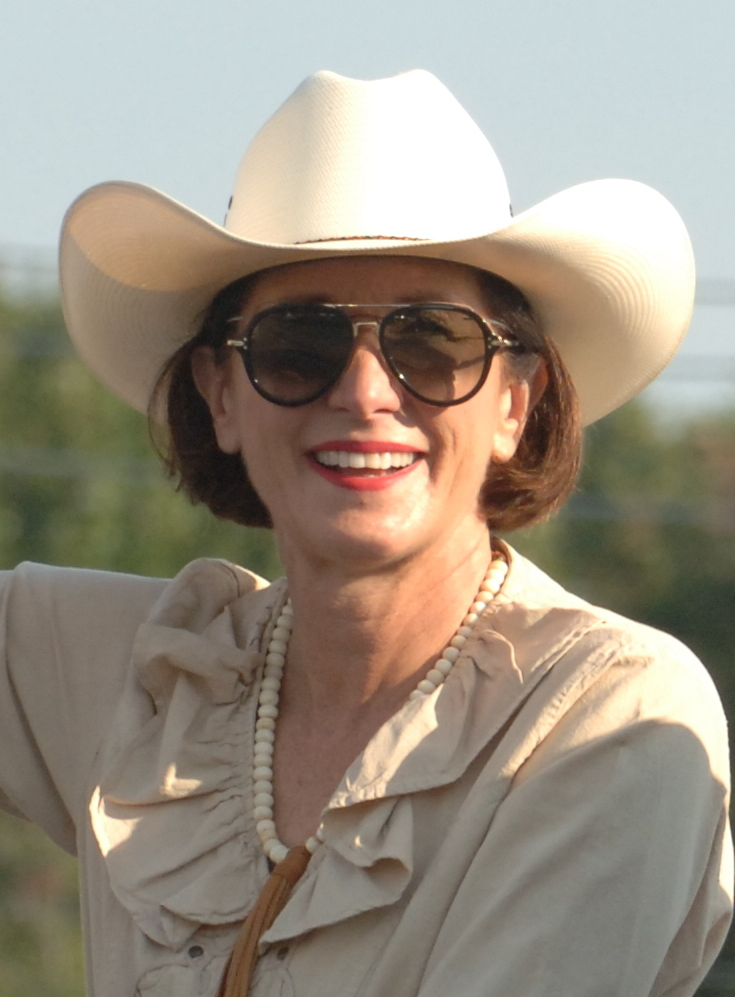
- Kolkhorst in 2017

Member of the Texas Senate from the 18th district
- Incumbent
- Assumed office December 22, 2014
- Preceded by: Glenn Hegar

Member of the Texas House of Representatives from the 13th district
- In office January 9, 2001 – December 21, 2014
- Preceded by: Charles Jones
- Succeeded by: Leighton Schubert

Personal details
- Born: Lois Winkelmann; November 4, 1964 (age 61) Brenham, Texas, U.S.
- Party: Republican
- Spouse: Jim Kolkhorst
- Children: 2
- Education: Texas Christian University (BA)
- Website: Office website Campaign website

Lois Winkelmann Kolkhorst (born November 4, 1964) is an American businesswoman and politician serving as a Republican member of the Texas State Senate. She was first elected to the state Senate from the 18th District in a special election held on December 6, 2014.

== Early life ==
Kolkhorst grew up in Brenham, Texas and is a graduate of Brenham High School. She is a 1988 graduate of Texas Christian University in Fort Worth, Texas, at which she studied advertising and public relations and played on the women's golf team.

Before joining the Texas Senate, she served as president and CEO of the Washington County Chamber of Commerce.

== Political career ==
Kolkhorst was seven terms in the Texas House representing House District 13, which included counties Austin, Burleson, Colorado, Fayette, Grimes, Lavaca, Washington.

Since 2014, Kolkhorst has represented the 18th District in the Texas Senate, a seat she won in 2014 in a special election. The district serves Victoria, Texas and stretches from Corpus Christi north to near Bryan.

She was named one of the "Best Legislators" and "Worst Legislators" in Texas by Texas Monthly magazine in 2007 and 2017 respectively.

She is Chair of the Senate Committee on Health and Human Services, as well as a member of the Senate Transportation Committee, Senate Select Committee on Texas Ports, Senate Committee on Water and Rural Affairs, the Texas Agriculture Policy Board, the State Water Implementation Fund for Texas Advisory Committee, the Texas Windstorm Insurance Oversight Board. and Committee on Nominations.

In 2021, Kolkhorst approvingly tweeted "Let freedom ring!" in support of legislation that prohibited businesses and government entities from requiring proof of vaccination for products or services.

In February 2023, Kolkhorst introduced a bill that could potentially ban Chinese, Iranian, North Korean and Russian immigrants from purchasing homes in Texas. In the 89th Texas Legislative session, Kolkhorst passed SB 17, which bans foreign nationals of countries listed on the National Threat Assessment Report from owning or buying land, water, timber, rare earth materials, oil, gas, and natural resources.

== Personal life ==
Kolkhorst and her husband, James Darren "Jim" Kolkhorst, have two children. Though they reside in Brenham, the couple owne and operated Kolkhorst Petroleum in Navasota in Grimes County. The company was founded by Jim Kolkhorst's father, James Henry "Bubba" Kolkhorst. This company was sold in 2020.

She is formerly a member of the St. Paul's Evangelical Lutheran Church in Brenham.

Texas House of Representatives
Preceded by Charles B. Jones	Member of the Texas House of Representatives from the 13th district 2001–2014	Succeeded by Leighton Schubert
Texas Senate
Preceded by Glenn Hegar	Member of the Texas Senate from the 18th district 2014–present	Incumbent
