= Joseph P. Wyatt Jr. =

American politician (1941–2022)

Joseph Wyatt
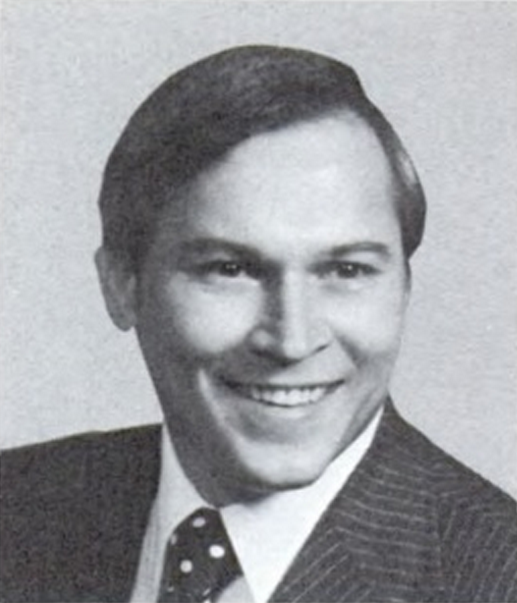

Member of the U.S. House of Representatives from Texas's 14th district
- In office January 3, 1979 – January 3, 1981
- Preceded by: John Andrew Young
- Succeeded by: Bill Patman

Member of the Texas House of Representatives
- In office January 12, 1971 – January 9, 1979
- Preceded by: Robert Armstrong
- Succeeded by: John Sharp
- Constituency: 43rd district (1971-1973); 40th district (1973-1979)

Personal details
- Born: Joseph Peyton Wyatt Jr. October 12, 1941 Victoria, Texas, U.S.
- Died: April 4, 2022 (aged 80) Victoria, Texas
- Party: Democratic (Before 1982); Republican (1982–2022)
- Education: University of Texas, Austin (BA)

Military service
- Allegiance: United States
- Branch/service: United States Marine Corps
- Years of service: 1966–1970
- Unit: United States Marine Corps Reserve

Joseph Peyton Wyatt Jr. (October 12, 1941 – April 4, 2022) was an American politician who served as the U.S. representative from Texas's 14th congressional district from 1979 to 1981.

== Biography ==
Born in Victoria, Texas, Wyatt attended the Victoria County public schools. He attended Victoria College, 1964. B.A., University of Texas, 1968. Graduate work, University of Houston Law Center, 1970. Wyatt served in the United States Marine Corps Reserve from 1966 to 1970. He served on the staffs of Texas State Senator William Neff "Bill" Patman, United States Representative Clark W. Thompson, and Vice President Lyndon B. Johnson. Auditor, Texas Alcoholic Beverage Commission, Austin, Texas. Wyatt served as director of community affairs, private firm, Victoria, Texas. He served as member of the Texas House of Representatives from 1971 to 1979. Wyatt served on the Southern Legislative Conference and National Conference of State Legislatures. He served as delegate, Texas State Democratic conventions from 1968 to 1978, and as a delegate to the Democratic National Convention in 1964.

Wyatt was elected as a Democrat to the Ninety-sixth Congress (January 3, 1979 – January 3, 1981).

Wyatt served as special projects consultant. He was a resident of Victoria, Texas. Wyatt died on April 4, 2022.

He ran for his former seat in 1982 as a Republican, but was defeated. The New York Times reported rumors that Wyatt had been involved in a homosexual scandal, charges which Patman used against him during the campaign.

== Sources ==
- United States Congress. "Joseph P. Wyatt Jr. (id: W000777)". Biographical Directory of the United States Congress.

U.S. House of Representatives
Preceded by John Andrew Young	Member of the U.S. House of Representatives from Texas's 14th congressional district 1979–1981	Succeeded by Bill Patman
