= Crystal Clear (David Dunn album) =

Studio album by David Dunn
- Released: June 23, 2015
- Genre: Contemporary Christian music
- Length: 49:40
- Label: BEC

David Dunn chronology
Crystal Clear (EP) (2014)	Crystal Clear (2015)

Singles from Crystal Clear
- 1. "Today Is Beautiful" Released: July 17, 2014; 2. "Have Everything" Released: February 19, 2015; 3. "Ready To Be Myself" Released: September 18, 2015

Crystal Clear is the second studio album by David Dunn. BEC Recordings released the project on June 23, 2015.

== Critical reception ==
Professional ratings
Review scores
Source	Rating
365 Days of Inspiring Media	4/5 stars
CCM Magazine	3.5/5 stars
Christian Music Review	3.8/5
CM Addict	3.5/5 stars
Cross Rhythms	8/10 squares
Jesus Freak Hideout	3/5 stars
New Release Today	4.5/5 stars

Matt Conner, awarding the album three and a half stars from CCM Magazine, reports, "While it may prove disappointing to early fans who heard most of these songs before, newer tracks like "No Matter What" are as hypnotic as the familiar favorites." Giving the album four and a half stars for New Release Today, Caitlin Lassiter explains, "David brings a new sound to the table with Crystal Clear, a sound that has been carefully crafted and produced to stand beside that of much more seasoned artists." David Craft, rating the album three stars at Jesus Freak Hideout, describes, "Ultimately, Dunn offers up a solid project with Crystal Clear, which holds its own against the industry standard."

Stella Reburn, indicating in an eight out of ten review for Cross Rhythms, says, "the first half of the album was better than the second, especially as it was padded out with two repeat remix tracks." Awarding the album four stars from 365 Days of Inspiring Media, Jonathan Andre writes, "Well done David for such an inspired and provoking album!" Laura Chambers, giving the album a 3.8 out of five at Christian Music Review, states, "Our direction will be Crystal Clear when we trust in the God of the universe to guide our steps." Rating the album three and a half stars from CM Addict, Andrew Funderburk says, "'Crystal Clear' stands as a strong foundation in introducing David to listeners of music, while also being a great start to propel him further into his career."

== Track listing ==
Crystal Clear
No.	Title	Length
1.	"It Is Well"	3:45
2.	"Have Everything"	3:41
3.	"Today Is Beautiful"	3:42
4.	"Nothing Left"	3:56
5.	"Six (Waiting for Love)"	4:13
6.	"Ready to Be Myself"	3:36
7.	"No Matter What"	4:03
8.	"Broken Cathedrals"	3:32
9.	"Clarity"	4:09
10.	"Happy"	3:34
11.	"Fade"	3:43
12.	"Today Is Beautiful (Thani Remix)"	3:42
13.	"It Is Well (Portrait Remix)"	4:04
