= Crystal Clear (EP) =

EP by David Dunn
- Released: July 15, 2014
- Genre: Contemporary Christian music
- Length: 19:18
- Label: BEC

David Dunn chronology
Crystal Clear (EP) (2014)	Crystal Clear (2015)

Singles from Crystal Clear (EP)
- 1. "Today is Beautiful" Released: July 17, 2014; 2. "Have Everything" Released: February 19, 2015

Crystal Clear marks the second EP from David Dunn. BEC Recordings released the project on July 15, 2014.

== Reception ==
Professional ratings
Review scores
Source	Rating
CCM Magazine	4/5 stars
Jesus Freak Hideout	3.5/5 stars
New Release Tuesday	4/5 stars

Signaling in a four and a half star review by CCM Magazine, Matt Conner recognizes, "Crystal Clear, resonates with Dunn’s strong message and killer vocals." Shaving a half star off her rating compared to the aforementioned, Jesus Freak Hideout's Courtney Warner, realizes, "Dunn provides a pleasant listening experience, even though it's got a familiar feel." Jonathan Francesco, indicating in a four star review for New Release Tuesday, replies, "David Dunn clearly threw all he had into this release and the potential shows."

== Tracks ==
No.	Title	Length
1.	"It is Well"	3:45
2.	"Have Everything"	3:41
3.	"Today is Beautiful"	3:42
4.	"Nothing Left"	3:56
5.	"Six (Waiting for Love)"	4:14
Total length:		19:18

== Charts ==
Chart (2014)	Peak position
US Christian Albums (Billboard)	48
