= Empower Texans =

Conservative advocacy group

- Formation: 2006
- Dissolved: 2020
- Type: 501(c)(4) nonprofit
- Purpose: To promote free-market principles in Texas
- Headquarters: Austin, Texas
- Key people: Michael Quinn Sullivan, CEO

Empower Texans was a conservative advocacy group in Texas that was active from 2006 to 2020. It was affiliated with Texans for Fiscal Responsibility, which was later spun off into its own organization. Empower Texans was based in Austin with operations in Dallas, Houston, and Midland. Empower Texans focused on fiscal conservatism by supporting lower taxes and spending restraint. It operated in Republican state-level politics in Texas, targeting candidates whom the group views as insufficiently conservative in Republican primaries.

== History ==
Empower Texans was formed in 2006 by businessman Tim Dunn. Dunn was the group's primary financial contributor. Dan and Farris Wilks were also major donors to Empower Texans. The group was described as Tea Party-aligned.

In 2014, Empower Texans CEO Michael Quinn Sullivan was fined by the Texas Ethics Commission after the agency alleged that he had failed to register as a lobbyist starting in 2010. Sullivan said his activities were best described as journalism rather than lobbying. He appealed the fine, but in 2021 was ordered to pay the fines by a district court judge.

In a 2025 piece, The New York Times described the group as a force that helped Texas politics shift to the right (such as helping Lt. Gov. Dan Patrick in his first election campaigns) while acknowledging that their track record is mixed.

== Texans for Fiscal Responsibility ==
Texans for Fiscal Responsibility (TFR) was a project of Empower Texans, but was later spun off into its own organization. The group was founded by Michael Quinn Sullivan. TFR was a nonprofit organization and filed as a 501(c)(4).

TFR advocated for low taxes and limited government spending. The group was described as trying to "purge the GOP establishment." Texas Monthly called TFR "one of the most influential advocacy groups in Austin".

Through TFR, Empower Texans published an annual Fiscal Responsibility Index (a legislator rating scorecard); and a Taxpayer Pledge, which was signed by lawmakers who promised not to raise taxes. The group handed out "Taxpayer Champion Awards" to legislators who scored well on TFR's Fiscal Responsibility Index.

In 2012 and 2013, Texas Monthly and The Texas Observer wrote that Michael Quinn Sullivan had exaggerated budget increases and other statistics to make it appear that more moderate Republicans were not sufficiently conservative.

== Texas Scorecard ==
In January 2015, Empower Texans launched a print and online publication project called Texas Scorecard.

In 2019, two employees of Texas Scorecard were granted media credentials to the Texas Senate but denied media credentials to the Texas House. Empower Texans filed a First Amendment lawsuit on the employees' behalf.

Texas Scorecard was spun off into its own nonprofit entity in 2020. Former Empower Texans CEO Michael Quinn Sullivan became the publisher of the publication.

== Activities ==
The group, which opposed Republican Speaker of the Texas House of Representatives Joe Straus, made $1.4 million in donations and in-kind contributions to anti-Straus candidates in the 2016 primary election.

In the 2018 Texas Republican primary elections, which were held on March 6, 2018, Empower Texans endorsed 34 candidates. A total of 13 endorsed candidates won, while 17 lost and four advanced to runoff primary elections in May 2018. Two of the group's notable victories were the defeat of state representatives Jason Villalba and Wayne Faircloth. It donated a total of $4.7 million to candidates during the 2018 election cycle.

In 2019, empower Texans CEO Michael Quinn Sullivan secretly recorded then Speaker of the House Dennis Bonnen and then chair of the state’s House Republican Caucus Dustin Burrows making negative comments about other legislators, and offering the group press credentials providing floor access in exchange for their working against moderate Republican members. On October 22, 2019, Bonnen announced that he would not seek re-election, paving the way for a new House speaker in the next session of the House. An investigation by the Texas Rangers ultimately concluded that Bonnen did not break any laws in the exchange.

In the 2020 election cycle, Empower Texans made endorsements in six state House races. As of June 2020, its political action committees had not yet reported any spending on the election cycle.

In June 2020, Empower Texans vice president Cary Cheshire and its general counsel Tony McDonald were recorded making derogatory comments about Texas Governor Greg Abbott, including joking about his use of a wheelchair. Cheshire and McDonald were disciplined by the organization over the incident.
