= Texas's 92nd House of Representatives district =

American legislative district

Texas's 92nd State House of Representatives district
Representative
Salman Bhojani; D–Euless
- Demographics: 27.5% White; 28.9% Black; 32.5% Hispanic; 10.1% Asian
- Population (2020) • Voting age: 188,309; 144,186

The 92nd district of the Texas House of Representatives consists of a portion of Tarrant County. In 2023 Salman Bhojani began representing the district.
