= Crystal Clear (bottled water brand) =

Bottled water brand

- Product type: Bottled Water
- Current owner: Solerex Water Technologies, Inc.
- Introduced: 1990; 36 years ago
- Markets: Philippines, Malaysia, Indonesia, Sierra Leone
- Website: crystalclear.com.ph

Crystal Clear is a bottled purified water brand of Solerex Water Technologies Inc. established in the Philippines in 1990.

== History ==
Solerex Water Technologies Inc., formerly part of a hotel interior design company since 1986, established itself as a separate organization in 1990. Since its inception it began focusing on marketing its bottled water brand "Crystal Clear."

Crystal Clear proved to be successful utilizing reverse osmosis for water purification. It began expanding as a water refilling station franchise in 1997 and grew to be the second most extensive water refilling station network in the Philippines. Growing to over 2,500 franchise stores and expanding to reach other markets in Indonesia and Malaysia.

In September 2012, Solerex Water Technologies tied up with Sierra Leone company Peninsular Innovative Group to launch a Crystal Clear Water location in Freetown.
