= Texas Tax Reform Commission =

State commission formed in 2005

State commission overview
- Formed: November 2005
- Dissolved: March 2006 (3 months)
- Jurisdiction: Texas
- Status: Dissolved
- State commission executive: John Sharp, Chairman
- Website: Official website (archive)

The Texas Tax Reform Commission (TTRC) was created by Texas Governor Rick Perry in 2005 to modernize the state tax system and provide long-term property tax relief as well as sound financing for public schools. Upon the Commission's creation, Governor Perry requested that the "ultimate recommendations on reforming the state tax structure focus on the goals of lowering property taxes, ensuring greater tax fairness, and providing a long-term, reliable source of funding for public schools" in Texas.

On 4 November 2005, Perry named the 24 members of the Commission. The team included a diverse, bipartisan group of private sector leaders representing all segments of the Texas economy. John Sharp, a Democrat and former Texas Comptroller from 1991 to 1999, was chosen to steer the Commission as its chairman.

Over the next four months, the Commission would travel across the State of Texas, holding hearings at which public input by citizens was encouraged. On 29 March 2006, the Commission released its Final Report.
