= Lone Star Card =

The Lone Star Card is an electronic benefit transfer pin-based card. The card is used for Supplemental Nutrition Assistance Program and Temporary Assistance for Needy Families programs for the State of Texas in the United States.

When the program was implemented in 1995, it was the largest EBT system in the United States, though New York's program was close in size.

Beginning April 1, 2026, the Lone Star Card can no longer be used to purchase candy and sweetened drinks.
