= Alamo Heights, Texas =

City in Bexar County, Texas, United States

- City
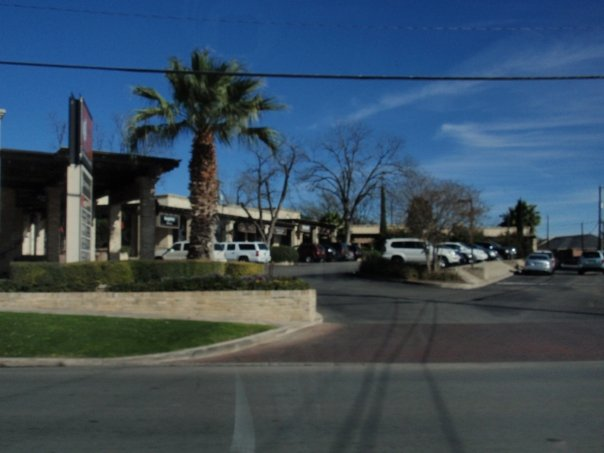
- Broadway Street
- Interactive map of Alamo Heights, Texas
- Coordinates: 29°28′58″N 98°28′2″W
- Country: United States
- State: Texas
- County: Bexar

Government
  - Type: Council-Manager
  - City Council: Mayor Bobby Rosenthal; Lawson Jessee; Blake Bonner; Karl Baker; Lynda Billa Burke; John Savage

Area
  - Total: 1.84 sq mi (4.77 km^{2})
  - Land: 1.84 sq mi (4.77 km^{2})
  - Water: 0 sq mi (0.00 km^{2})
- Elevation: 801 ft (244 m)

Population (2020)
  - Total: 7,357
  - Density: 4,678.6/sq mi (1,806.42/km^{2})
- Time zone: UTC-6 (Central (CST))
  - Summer (DST): UTC-5 (CDT)
- ZIP code: 78209
- Area codes: 210, 726
- FIPS code: 48-01600
- GNIS feature ID: 1329300
- Website: www.alamoheightstx.gov

Alamo Heights is a city in Bexar County, Texas, United States, that is surrounded by the city of San Antonio. At the time of the 2020 census, the population of Alamo Heights was 7,357. It is part of the Greater San Antonio metropolitan area. A portion of the University of the Incarnate Word is in Alamo Heights.

Alamo Heights is about 5 miles (8 km) north of downtown San Antonio, the urban core of the seventh-largest city in America, and is almost completely surrounded by the city of San Antonio.

== History ==
The City of Alamo Heights was incorporated in 1922. Eventual growth to the north would happen later with the annexation of Bluebonnet Hills and Sylvan Hills in 1928 and 1944, respectively.

== Geography ==
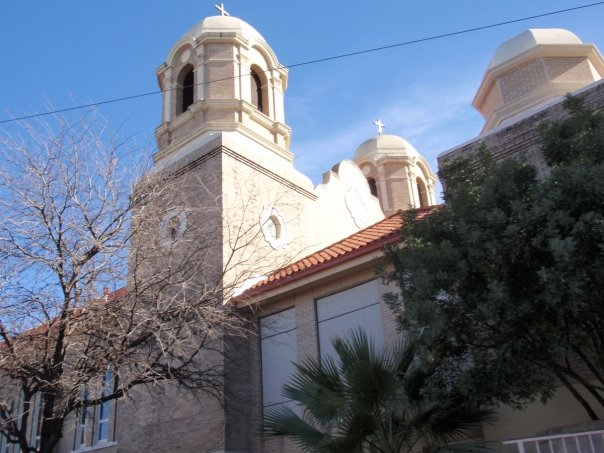
St. Peter Prince of the Apostles

Alamo Heights is located at 29°28′58″N 98°28′2″W (29.482881, –98.467271). It is bordered by the following neighborhoods: Lincoln Heights to the north, Olmos Park to the west, Brackenridge Park and Fort Sam Houston to the south, and Terrell Hills to the east. All of them are districts within San Antonio except for Terrell Hills and Olmos Park, both independent municipalities similarly to Alamo Heights. Alamo Heights is approximately 3 miles (5 km) south of the San Antonio International Airport and 5 miles (8 km) north of downtown San Antonio, both of which are accessible via Broadway and U.S. 281 North.

According to the United States Census Bureau, Alamo Heights has a total area of 1.9 square miles (4.8 km^{2}), all land.

== Demographics ==
Historical population
Census	Pop.	Note	%±
1930	3,874		—
1940	5,700		47.1%
1950	8,000		40.4%
1960	7,552		−5.6%
1970	6,933		−8.2%
1980	6,252		−9.8%
1990	6,502		4.0%
2000	7,319		12.6%
2010	7,031		−3.9%
2020	7,357		4.6%
U.S. Decennial Census

=== 2020 census ===
As of the 2020 census, there were 7,357 people, 3,196 households, and 2,158 families residing in the city.

The median age was 45.0 years. 21.6% of residents were under the age of 18 and 23.1% of residents were 65 years of age or older. For every 100 females there were 85.1 males, and for every 100 females age 18 and over there were 81.6 males age 18 and over.

Of those households, 28.8% had children under the age of 18 living in them. Of all households, 50.6% were married-couple households, 14.9% were households with a male householder and no spouse or partner present, and 30.6% were households with a female householder and no spouse or partner present. About 34.0% of all households were made up of individuals and 18.2% had someone living alone who was 65 years of age or older.

There were 3,579 housing units, of which 10.7% were vacant. Among occupied housing units, 67.4% were owner-occupied and 32.6% were renter-occupied. The homeowner vacancy rate was 2.2% and the rental vacancy rate was 12.4%.

100.0% of residents lived in urban areas, while 0% lived in rural areas.

Racial composition as of the 2020 census
Race	Percent
White	79.0%
Black or African American	1.0%
American Indian and Alaska Native	0.2%
Asian	2.3%
Native Hawaiian and Other Pacific Islander	<0.1%
Some other race	3.7%
Two or more races	13.8%
Hispanic or Latino (of any race)	19.6%

=== 2000 census ===
As of the 2000 U.S. census, there were 7,319 people, 3,197 households, and 1,819 families residing in this city. The population density was 3,964.9 inhabitants per square mile (1,530.9/km^{2}). There were 3,460 housing units at an average density of 1,874.4 units per square mile (723.7 units/km^{2}). The racial makeup of this town was 93.80% White, 0.56% African American, 0.33% Native American, 0.85% Asian, 0.01% Pacific Islander, 2.81% from other races, and 1.64% from two or more races. Hispanic or Latino of any race were 13.55% of the population.

There were 3,197 households, out of which 28.1% had children under the age of 18 living with them, 46.5% were married couples living together, 7.9% had a female householder with no husband present, and 43.1% were non-families. 38.3% of all households were made up of individuals, and 12.9% had someone living alone who was 65 years of age or older. The average household size was 2.16 and the average family size was 2.91.

In the city, the population was spread out, with 22.3% under the age of 18, 6.2% from 18 to 24, 29.2% from 25 to 44, 25.1% from 45 to 64, and 17.2% who were 65 years of age or older. The median age was 40 years. For every 100 females, there were 82.5 males. For every 100 females age 18 and over, there were 75.0 males.

The median income per household in Alamo Heights was $77,257 in 2008 (compared to $64,688 in 2000), while the median per family income was $86,897. Males had a median income of $60,527 versus $37,089 for females. The per capita income for the city was estimated to be $56,335 in 2008. About 1.6% of families and 3.5% of the population were below the poverty line, including 3.7% of those under age 18 and 6.4% of those age 65 or over.

Estimated median house or condo value in 2008 was $341,600 (compared to $202,200 in 2000).

Mean prices in 2008: All housing units: $440,427. Detached houses: $437,838. Townhouses or other attached units: $373,366. In 2-unit ("duplex") structures: $200,395. In 3-to-4-unit ("triplex" to "fourplex") structures: $294,787. In 5-or-more-unit structures: $491,936.

== Federal government offices ==
The United States Postal Service operates the Alamo Heights Post Office.

== Education ==
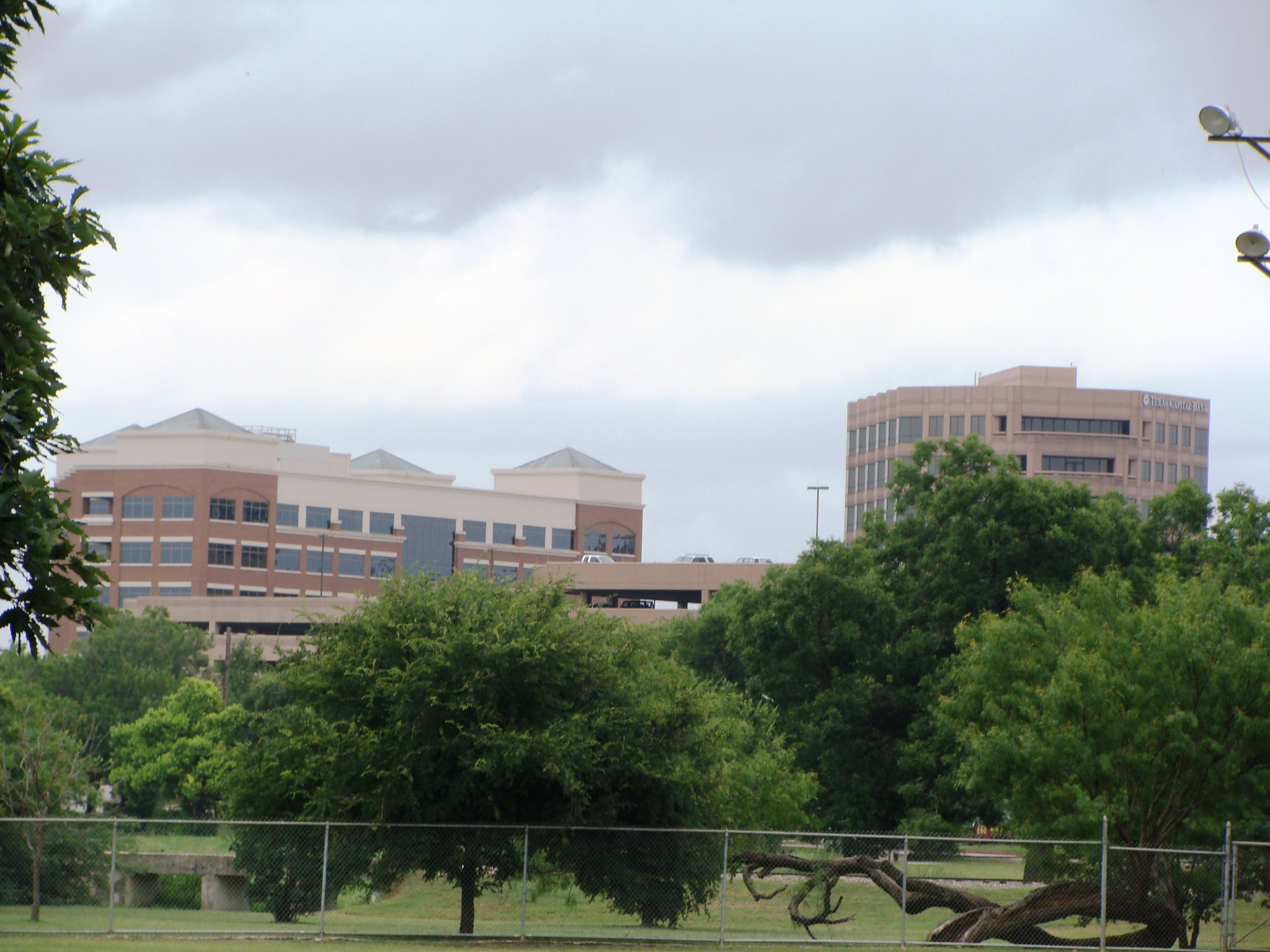
A view from Brackenridge Park

=== Primary and secondary schools ===
Alamo Heights is served by the Alamo Heights Independent School District, which has its headquarters in the city limits.

Howard Early Childhood Center in San Antonio serves early childhood residents. Most residents are zoned to Cambridge Elementary School in Alamo Heights, while some are zoned to Woodridge Elementary School in San Antonio. All residents are zoned to Alamo Heights Junior School in San Antonio and Alamo Heights High School which is situated in Alamo Heights at 6900 Broadway.

Private schools within the town limits are St. Peter Prince of the Apostles Catholic School (K–8) and St. Luke's Episcopal School (Pre-K–8). Nearby private schools outside the town limits include The San Antonio Academy in Monte Vista (Pre-K–8), Keystone School in Monte Vista (Pre-K–12), St. Mary's Hall (San Antonio, Texas) (K–12), Incarnate Word High School in San Antonio (9–12), St. Anthony Catholic School in Monte Vista (Pre-K3–8), St. Anthony Catholic High School (9–12) in Monte Vista, and St. Pius X in San Antonio (K–8).

=== Colleges and universities ===
The University of the Incarnate Word is partially within Alamo Heights. Trinity University is 1 mile (1.6 km) southwest of the city limits in the San Antonio district of Monte Vista.

=== Public libraries ===
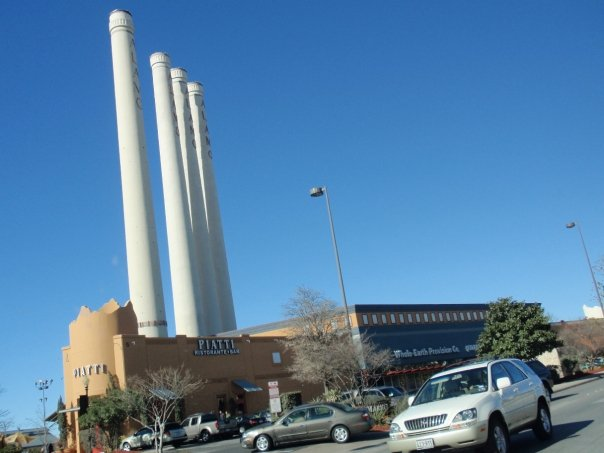
Quarry Market Shopping Center

There are no public libraries in Alamo Heights. The Landa Memorial Library of the San Antonio Public Library, located in the Monte Vista Historic District in San Antonio, is the most proximal.

== Notable people ==
- Patrick Bailey, former professional football linebacker and part of the 2008 Pittsburgh Steelers which won Super Bowl XLIII.
- Chrystabell, singer and songwriter
- Chase Clement, former professional football quarterback
- Fiona Crawley, tennis player
- Christopher Cross, Grammy-winning singer, songwriter, and guitarist attended Alamo Height High School
- Ben Lammers, professional basketball player
- Michael A. Nelson, USAF lieutenant general, attended Alamo Height High School
- Howard W. Peak, former mayor of San Antonio
- Rick Riordan, author of Percy Jackson & the Olympians
- Peter Weller, actor
- Forrest Whitley, professional baseball pitcher, formerly with the Houston Astros.
- Shawn Worthen

== Attractions ==
The Alamo Quarry Market shopping center, Quarry Village, Lincoln Heights Shopping Center, H-E-B's Central Market, North Star Mall, McNay Art Museum, and the headquarters for Clear Channel Communications can be found outside Alamo Heights.

== See also ==
- List of cities in Texas
