= Alamo Heights Independent School District =

School district in Texas

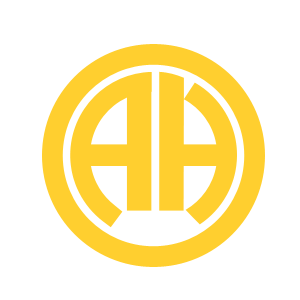

Location
- 7101 Broadway St. San Antonio, Texas ESC Region 20 USA
- Coordinates: 29°29′33″N 98°28′0″W

District information
- Type: Independent school district
- Grades: Pre-K through 12
- Superintendent: Dana Bashara
- Schools: 6 (2009-10)
- NCES District ID: 4807590

Students and staff
- Students: 4748 (2010-11)
- Teachers: 335.62 (2009-10) (on full-time equivalent (FTE) basis)
- Student–teacher ratio: 14.2 (2009-10)
- Athletic conference: UIL Class 5A Football & Basketball
- District mascot: Mules
- Colors: Blue, Gold

Other information
- TEA District Accountability Rating for 2011-12: Academically Acceptable
- Website: Alamo Heights ISD

Alamo Heights Independent School District is a school district based in Alamo Heights, Texas (USA). Alamo Heights ISD also serves Olmos Park, most of Terrell Hills, and a small portion of San Antonio.

== History ==
The Alamo Heights Independent School District traces its history from the year 1909 when the first school, a two-room wooden frame building on Townsend Avenue, was built in this picturesque area as part of a rural county district. A new school building of masonry was later constructed on the site that is now Cambridge Elementary School. In 1923, just one year after the high school building was added to the growing campus, the Alamo Heights system became an independent school district of 300 students.

While the hub of activity for Alamo Heights students centered at Cambridge until the 1950s, the district branched out into the neighboring community at the former cement plant near Jones-Maltsberger Road, also called "Cementville." Known as the "Bluebonnet School, " the Alamo Heights Ward School served children whose parents worked at the plant.

The present athletic stadium was built in 1938 by the Work Projects Administration. Originally, games were played at Howard Field on the present Cambridge site, where former head coach Earl "Mule " Frazier led the football team to a first district championship in 1926 - and lent Alamo Heights its mascot.

World War II was responsible for a very real transition for Alamo Heights from a rural district to a suburban district, accompanied by the baby boom and opening of numerous subdivisions within district boundaries. In fact, the district almost doubled during that time.

To continue to meet the needs of a growing population, the district erected Alamo Heights High School in 1949–50, the original unit of Woodridge Elementary in 1951–52, Howard Early Childhood Center in 1956, Alamo Heights Jr School in 1959, and the former Robbins Elementary School in 1964.

Today, the Alamo Heights Independent School District covers 9.4 square miles and serves students from the communities of Alamo Heights, Terrell Hills, Olmos Park, and a portion of north San Antonio.

The University of Texas at San Antonio is a repository for a collection of 43 flags (8.5 in x 11.5 in.) created by the students of Alamo Heights Junior School in the late 1960s. The flags, recreations of flags that have flown in Texas over the course of Texas history, were originally hung in the students' classroom, but were donated to be displayed at HemisFair '68 (1968 World's Fair in San Antonio, Texas). The collection was donated by Larry Williams, the students' teacher at Alamo Heights Junior School.

== Finances ==
As of the 2010–2011 school year, the appraised valuation of property in the district was $4,838,847,000. The maintenance tax rate was $0.104 and the bond tax rate was $0.013 per $100 of appraised valuation.

== Academic achievement ==
In 2011, the school district was rated "academically acceptable" by the Texas Education Agency. Forty-nine percent of districts in Texas in 2011 received the same rating. No state accountability ratings will be given to districts in 2012. A school district in Texas can receive one of four possible rankings from the Texas Education Agency: Exemplary (the highest possible ranking), Recognized, Academically Acceptable, and Academically Unacceptable (the lowest possible ranking).

Historical district TEA accountability ratings

- 2011: Academically Acceptable
- 2010: Recognized
- 2009: Academically Acceptable
- 2008: Academically Acceptable
- 2007: Academically Acceptable
- 2006: Academically Acceptable
- 2005: Academically Acceptable
- 2004: Academically Acceptable

== List of schools ==
In the 2011–2012 school year, the district had students in six schools.

Regular instructional

- Alamo Heights High School (Grades 9–12)
- Alamo Heights Junior School (Grades 6–8)
- Cambridge Elementary School (Grades 1–5)
- Howard Early Childhood School (Grades Pre-K-K)
- Woodridge Elementary School (Grades 1–5)
- Robbins Academy (Grades 9–12)

JJAEP instructional

- Bexar County JJAEP (Grades 6–12)

== Special programs ==
=== Athletics ===
Alamo Heights High School participates in the boys sports of baseball, basketball, football, lacrosse, soccer, and wrestling. The school participates in the girls sports of basketball, softball, soccer, and volleyball. For the 2012 through 2014 school years, Alamo Heights High School will play football in UIL Class 4A. in 2006 AHHS won state in football div. 4A.

== Notable alumni ==
- Patrick Bailey, class of 2004, was a linebacker for the Tennessee Titans from 2010 until 2013, and won a Super Bowl with the Pittsburgh Steelers in 2009.
- Angela Belcher, class of 1985 (attended but did not graduate from AHHS), is the Director of the Biomolecular Materials Group at MIT.
- Marie Brenner, class of 1967, is an author, investigative journalist, and writer-at-large for "Vanity Fair"
- William H. Cade Class of 64, Animal Behaviorist, Othroperist, President Emeritus of the University of Lethbridge.
- Christopher Cross, class of 1969, is a recording artist with Top 40 hits including "Sailing" and "Arthur's Theme".
- Dayna Devon, class of 1988, is a TV host of the syndicated show- EXTRA.
- Rick Riordan, class of 1982, is a San Antonio-based novelist of the Tres Navarre mystery series for adults and the New York Times bestselling Percy Jackson series for children.
- Chris Sifuentes, class of 1999, is a radio personality at KISS-FM.
- Clay Tarver, class of 1984, screenwriter for Joy Ride.
- Peter Weller, class of 1965, is an actor in movies such as RoboCop.

== See also ==
- List of school districts in Texas
- List of high schools in Texas
