= Edith McAllister =

American civic leader and philanthropist (1918–2018)

- Born: Edith Scott; February 18, 1918; Madisonville, Texas, U.S.
- Died: July 1, 2018 (aged 100); Terrell Hills, Texas, U.S.
- Occupations: Civic leader; philanthropist
- Spouse: Walter W. McAllister Jr. (m. 1940)
- Children: 4

Edith McAllister (née Scott; February 18, 1918 – July 1, 2018) was a San Antonio civic leader, philanthropist, and a founder of the Southwest School of Art in San Antonio, Texas. She was also the first woman in the United States to be a campaign chairman for United Way.

She was president of the San Antonio Art League, president of the San Antonio Museum Association, president of Women's Committee of the San Antonio Symphony, president of Cancer Therapy and Research Center (now the Mays Cancer Center at the UT Health San Antonio Cancer Center), and a founding trustee and president of the Southwest School of Art.

== Early life and education ==
McAllister was born February 18, 1918, to Rosa Wilson and Reece W. Scott in Madisonville, Texas; Edith had one older sister named Lucille. Reece W. Scott went to University of North Carolina and University of Texas Law School, and later served as a member of the Texas Bar Association. Before moving to San Antonio, Texas, her family lived in Davenport, Iowa.

When McAllister was ten years old, her family moves to San Antonio. Her father had plans to develop the Hot Wells Hotel and Spa which was unsuccessful due to the Great Depression. McAllister attended Jefferson High School in San Antonio, Texas, from 1929 to 1933. She attended University of Texas at Austin and was a member of Kappa Alpha Theta sorority. She planned to get a degree in business administration, however she did not graduate from the university because of lack of funds.

McAlliseter met her husband, Walter McAllister Jr., met in high school and both attended the University of Texas. Her husband did not complete college but became a successful banker in San Antonio; he was the son of San Antonio mayor Walter McAllister Sr.

== Philanthropy ==
McAllister herself would say that she became bored with “sitting around playing cards”, and first began volunteering with the San Antonio Junior League. She had the support and mentor-ship of her husband's father, Walter McAllister Sr. Her efforts in Junior League expanded to fundraising for the development of Southwest Craft Center in 1972, now the Southwest School of Art and Craft, a four-year art school in San Antonio. She served as a Girl Scout leader, president of the Alamo Heights Junior School PTA, and Mistress of the Robes for the Fiesta coronation of 1965.

McAllister volunteered her time to help develop San Antonio. She served as co-chairmen of the development committee for the University of Texas at San Antonio for thirteen years to help improve demographics. In San Antonio she also served as a volunteer in the Battle of Flowers Association. McAllister was the first woman to serve on the Boy Scouts board. She helped found the Cancer Therapy and Research Center that is now a part of the UT Health and Science Center. She also helped found the Center for Medical Humanities and Ethics. She served on the Centennial Commission for UT Austin and the board for the University of Texas Marine Science Institute.

In 1972, McAllister led the San Antonio United Way Campaign. She was the first woman to hold this position and while campaign chair she helped raise $3.7 million for San Antonio and Bexar County. At one time she served on 22 boards simultaneously.

== Personal life and death ==
Edith married Walter W. McAllister Jr., who was the son of Walter W. McAllister Sr, a five-term mayor of San Antonio. Edith and Walter Jr. married on July 25, 1940, and had four children. Edith dated McAllister throughout her senior year of high school and attended college together. The couple married in Christ Episcopal Church in San Antonio, Texas. Together the couple had four children; Walter III (“Bo”), Taddy, Reagin, and Eloise. During her childhood, McAllister was influenced by her father's appreciation for ballroom dancing. She continued dancing and water skiing until she was 92.

She died July 1, 2018, in her home in Terrell Hills, Texas of congestive heart failure at the age of 100.

== Legacy ==
The Animal Rehab Facility at the University of Texas Marine Science Institute is now named after her. A building and a grant at the Southwest School of Art is named in her honor as well.

McAllister was inducted into the Texas Philanthropy Hall of Fame in 1998 by the Philanthropy in Texas magazine for her fund-raising efforts over 50 years to support numerous nonprofits including the University of Texas at San Antonio, Boy and Girl Scouts, the Cancer Therapy and Research Center (now the Mays Cancer Center at the UT Health San Antonio Cancer Center), the University of Texas Marine Science Institute, and the Southwest School of Art, among others.
