= Dorcy =

Dorcy may refer to:

- Ben Dorcy (1925–2017), American roadie
- Dorcy Rugamba (born 1969), Rwandan author, actor, and stage director
