= Yancey, Texas =

Census-designated place in Texas, US

Coordinates: 29°07′42″N 99°07′43″W

Yancey is a Census Designated Place in Medina County, Texas, United States. It is approximately 13 miles south of Hondo on Farm to Market Road 462 and 36 miles west of San Antonio. It is part of the San Antonio metropolitan area.

As of the 2020 census, Yancey had a population of 300.

It has an oil business, an RV repair business and a restaurant called "Red's Place".

== Demographics ==
Historical population
Census	Pop.	Note	%±
2020	300		—
U.S. Decennial Census; 1850–1900 1910; 1920 1930 1940; 1950 1960 1970; 1980 1990 2000; 2010 2020

Yancey first appeared as a census designated place in the 2020 U.S. census.

=== 2020 census ===
Yancey CDP, Texas – Racial and ethnic composition Note: the US Census treats Hispanic/Latino as an ethnic category. This table excludes Latinos from the racial categories and assigns them to a separate category. Hispanics/Latinos may be of any race.
Race / Ethnicity (NH = Non-Hispanic)	Pop 2020	% 2020
White alone (NH)	90	30.00%
Black or African American alone (NH)	0	0.00%
Native American or Alaska Native alone (NH)	1	0.33%
Asian alone (NH)	0	0.00%
Native Hawaiian or Pacific Islander alone (NH)	0	0.00%
Other race alone (NH)	2	0.67%
Mixed race or Multiracial (NH)	5	1.67%
Hispanic or Latino (any race)	202	67.33%
Total	300	100.00%

== Education ==
It is in the Hondo Independent School District, which operates Hondo High School.
