= Alamo Quarry Market =

Lifestyle center in San Antonio, Texas, US

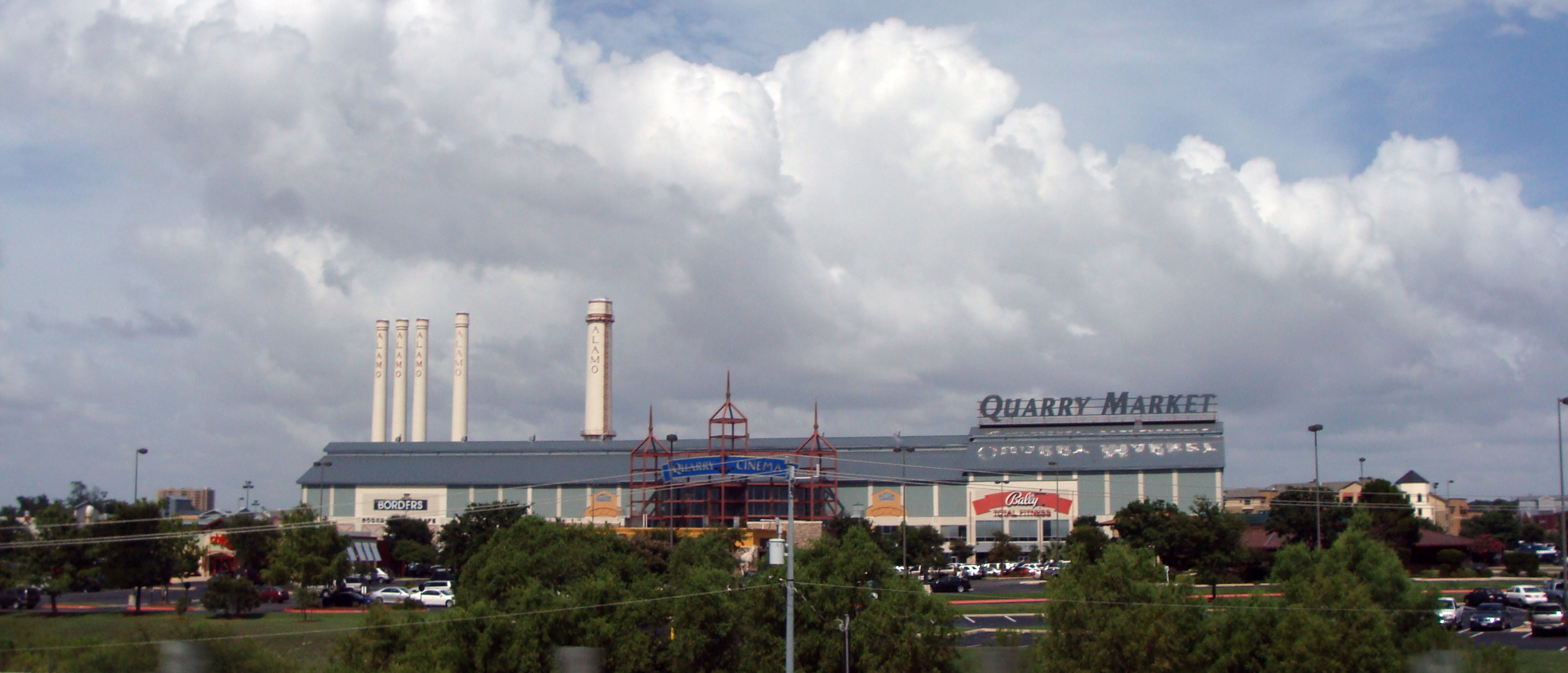
- Alamo Quarry Market, 2010
- Location: San Antonio, Texas, United States
- Coordinates: 29.495294°N 98.480526°W
- Address: 255 E. Basse Road, San Antonio, Texas, 78209
- Opened: 1997
- Developer: Trammel Crow Central Texas Inc.; Alamo Cement Co.
- Owner: American Assets Inc.
- Architect: Hodges and Associates
- Num. of stores: 60+
- Floor area: 580,000 square feet (54,000 m^{2})
- Floors: 1 (2 in Nordstrom Rack)
- Parking: 3,369
- Website: www.quarrymarket.com

Alamo Quarry Market is a lifestyle center located in the Lincoln Heights neighborhood of north central San Antonio in the US state of Texas, near the cities of Alamo Heights and Terrell Hills. It was formerly a cement factory and quarry operated by Alamo Cement from 1908 to 1986, which later worked with Trammel Crow Central Texas to redevelop the property.

Alamo Quarry Market incorporated new and old factory buildings into its design, including three former industrial buildings and five smokestacks. The complex features a Regal Cinema theater and several retailers and restaurants.

== History ==
=== Alamo Cement ===
Alamo Quarry Market is located in the Lincoln Heights neighborhood of San Antonio, between Basse Road and US Highway 281. on the site of a former limestone quarry and cement factory, operated by Alamo Cement from 1908 to 1986. Alamo Cement was chartered in 1880 to establish the first Portland cement plant west of the Mississippi, at what is now Brackenridge Park. Buildings that used Alamo cement in their construction include the Texas State Capitol and the Driskill Hotel. Once the site was exhausted, the company moved its operations north to 500 acres (200 ha) outside the original city limits, at what is now the Alamo Quarry Market. More than 90 three-room cottages were constructed for workers and their families, becoming a community known as "Cementville". A Swiss company bought Alamo Cement in 1979, and the plant was moved in 1985, while the cottages were razed for luxury resident, retail, and golf-course development, which became Lincoln Heights.

=== Construction ===
The lifestyle center was constructed by Trammell Crow Central Texas, which worked together with Alamo Cement to incorporate the shell of the former plant into the construction. According to Trammel Crow managing director Bob Barnes, planning on the project began in 1994 and work began on September 1, 1996. Barnes envisioned a project that would "address a need in San Antonio for a high-end development that combines traditional retailing, specialty retailing, and entertainment".

A 54-acre (22 ha) site in the southeast corner of the property was chosen for the 530,000-square-foot (49,000 m^{2}) complex. At the time, Alamo Quarry Market was twice the size of the nearby Lincoln Heights Shopping Center and had the same amount of retail space as Rivercenter Mall in downtown San Antonio. According to the San Antonio Express-News, real estate sources estimated its cost to be $50 million. Original plans included 16 buildings and 60 tenants, including 10 restaurants, a movie theater, and a health club. Trammell Crow conducted traffic planning, deciding on 11 entrance points, including three with stoplights, and the complex opened with 3,369 parking spaces.

The opening date for the complex was set for September 1997; the first shops opened in late spring 1997. By January 1998, 94% of stores had been leased, and 72% were open. Major tenants included Borders, Bed, Bath and Beyond, OfficeMax, and a two-story gym. The first Restoration Hardware, Pottery Barn, and Whole Earth Provision in San Antonio signed on to Alamo Quarry Market. Rents ranged from about $24 to $35 per square foot.

Alamo Quarry Market was sold to the California State Teachers' Retirement System, a pension program, in 1997 for $89.6 million. It was sold to San Diego-based real estate investment company American Assets in November 2003 for $121 million.

== Design ==
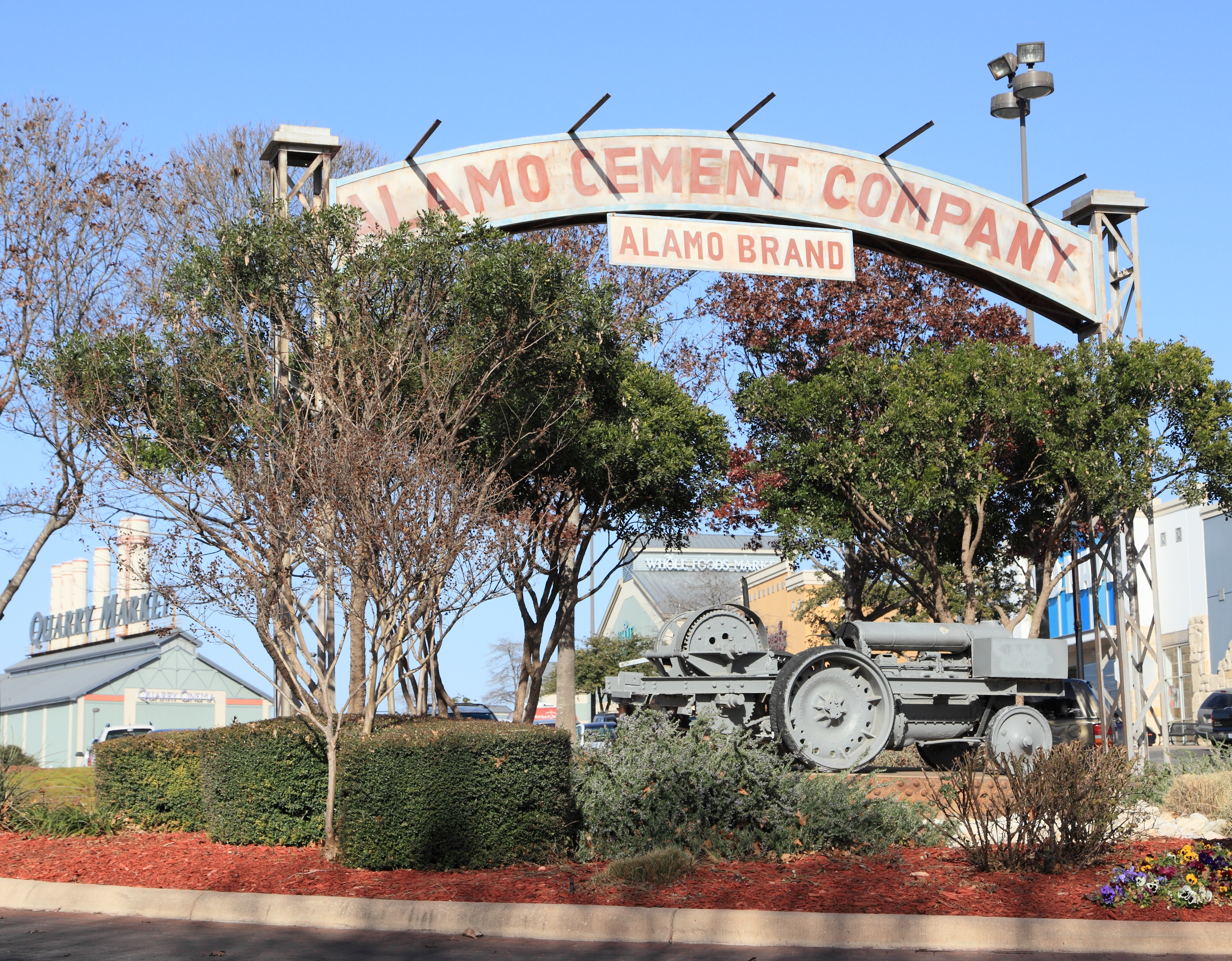
Alamo Quarry Market entrance on Basse Road

According to the managing director for Trammell Crow, Alamo Cement maintained a "desire to preserve the history of this site – the smokestacks and some of the buildings", similarly echoed by the city's historic preservation office. Dallas-based architect Hodges and Associates incorporated historic buildings into the center, including the shell of the former cement plant. The framework of the former one-story clinker shed was preserved, and the building was converted into a glass-fronted, 14-screen Act III Theatres complex that occupied about 70,000 square feet (6,500 m^{2}). An arrangement of steel catwalks and stairs, serves as exits from the second-floor of the movie theater. The factory's crusher building, with sloping industrial roofs, was renovated for the opening of Canyon Cafe, and the generator building, which was demolished during site cleanup, was reconstructed from original plans for the restaurant L'Etoile. The new constructions mirror the shed-form pediments and monitors used in the old structures, as well as the parapets constructed in the Mission Revival architectural style.

The complex was designed to have a "rubble" look, with crumbled rocks decorated throughout the complex. Natural-cut limestone trim was used for the buildings, and greenery was planted. Old equipment used in factory operations was placed decoratively. Rolling stock, including a steam locomotive and an ore car among others, was placed in traffic circles in the entrances and along sidewalks. Large half-gears were separated and used as decorative awnings. In the theater complex, a 300,000-pound (140,000 kg) diesel engine, produced by Nordberg Manufacturing Company, sits on a concrete pad above the concession stands, illuminated by a light and smoke show at fifteen minute intervals.

Delta Structural Technology was contracted to restore and preserve three of the five smokestacks from the cement factory, which were previously retrofitted with steel bands every 20 feet (6.1 m) from top to bottom. The stacks are approximately 204 feet (62 m) high, 18 feet (5.5 m) diameter at the base, and 15 feet (4.6 m) diameter at the top. The project received multiple awards within the concrete industry. At the base of three smokestacks, the spigot openings display windows for a retailer.
