= Hondo Independent School District =

School district in Texas, United States

Hondo Independent School District is a public school district based in Hondo, Texas in the United States. It includes Hondo and Yancey. Located in Medina County, a small portion of the district extends into Frio County. The Hondo School District was organized in 1883 and became an independent district in 1904.

In 2009, the school district was rated "academically acceptable" by the Texas Education Agency.

== Schools ==
- Hondo High School (Grades 9–12)
- McDowell Middle School (Grades 6–8)
- Newell E. Woolls Intermediate School (Grades 3–5)
- Meyer Elementary School (Grades PK-2)
