= Frank Lombardino =

American politician (1927–1992)

Member of the Texas Senate from the 26th district
- In office January 14, 1975 – January 9, 1979
- Preceded by: Nelson Wolff
- Succeeded by: R.L. 'Bob' Vale

Member of the Texas House of Representatives from district 57-G
- In office January 9, 1973 – January 14, 1975
- Preceded by: District created
- Succeeded by: Abraham D. Ribak

Member of the Texas House of Representatives from district 57-10
- In office January 10, 1967 – January 9, 1973
- Preceded by: District created
- Succeeded by: District abolished

Personal details
- Born: January 27, 1927
- Died: September 23, 1992 (aged 65)
- Party: Democratic

Frank Lombardino (January 27, 1927 – September 23, 1992) was an American politician who served in the Texas House of Representatives from 1967 to 1975 and in the Texas Senate from the 26th district from 1975 to 1979.
