= George C. Windrow =

American politician and soldier (1931–2019)

George Clyde Windrow, Jr. (November 16, 1931 – March 23, 2019) was an American politician and soldier.

== Biography ==
Windrow was born in Hondo, Texas. His parents were George C. Windrow, Sr. and Rhoda Mae Taylor Windrow. Windrow graduated from Thomas Jefferson High School, San Antonio, Texas, in 1949. Windrow went to University of Wisconsin from 1949 to 1951 and to Marquette University from 1951 to 1954. He lived in Cudahy, Wisconsin and worked as a drop forger in the manufacturing industry. Windrow was involved in the International Brotherhood of Boilermakers and Blacksmiths. He served in the Wisconsin State Assembly in 1955 and 1956 and was a Democrat. Windrow received his bachelor's degree in mechanical engineering from Texas A&M University in 1958 and his MBA from the George Washington University School of Business. He was commissioned a second lieutenant in the United States Army Reserve and retired as a colonel. Windrow lived in San Antonio, Texas.
