= Terrell Hills, Texas =

City in Bexar County, Texas, United States

- City
- Location of Terrell Hills, Texas
- Coordinates: 29°28′48″N 98°26′47″W
- Country: United States
- State: Texas
- County: Bexar

Government
  - Type: Council-Manager
  - City Council: Mayor John Low; Bill Mitchell; Kate Lanfear; Peter Mako; Emmy Rogers Ballantyne
  - City Manager: William Foley

Area
  - Total: 1.61 sq mi (4.18 km^{2})
  - Land: 1.61 sq mi (4.18 km^{2})
  - Water: 0 sq mi (0.00 km^{2})
- Elevation: 801 ft (244 m)

Population (2020)
  - Total: 5,045
  - Density: 3,378.8/sq mi (1,304.58/km^{2})
- Time zone: UTC-6 (Central (CST))
  - Summer (DST): UTC-5 (CDT)
- ZIP code: 78209
- Area codes: 210, 726
- FIPS code: 48-72296
- GNIS feature ID: 1348382
- ANSI Code: 2412051
- Website: terrell-hills.com

Terrell Hills is a city in Bexar County, Texas, United States; it is located 5 miles (8 km) northeast of downtown San Antonio. As of the 2020 census Terrell Hills had a population of 5,045.

== Description ==
The city is part of a group of three cities—Terrell Hills, Alamo Heights, and Olmos Park—located between Uptown San Antonio, Midtown San Antonio, Downtown San Antonio, and Fort Sam Houston (a U.S. Army post). Terrell Hills is bordered on the west by Alamo Heights, on the east by Fort Sam Houston, on the north by Uptown San Antonio, and on the south by San Antonio's Near East Side. It is part of the San Antonio metropolitan area.

The community is named after Frederick Terrell, a local bank president who had served as mayor of San Antonio in 1901. Development of the community began in 1919, when Terrell sold 22.5 acres (9.1 ha) of property to a private association called the Terrell Hills Community. This organization managed the community until 1939, when it incorporated as a municipality. In 1945, the City of San Antonio attempted to annex the new municipality without permitting an election in either Terrell Hills or San Antonio, but Terrell Hills successfully sued to block the annexation.

== Geography ==
According to the United States Census Bureau, the city has a total area of 1.6 square miles (4.2 km^{2}), all land.

== Demographics ==
Historical population
Census	Pop.	Note	%±
1940	1,236		—
1950	2,708		119.1%
1960	5,572		105.8%
1970	5,225		−6.2%
1980	4,644		−11.1%
1990	4,592		−1.1%
2000	5,019		9.3%
2010	4,878		−2.8%
2020	5,045		3.4%
U.S. Decennial Census

=== 2020 census ===
As of the 2020 census, Terrell Hills had a population of 5,045, 1,850 households, and 1,314 families. The median age was 43.3 years; 26.0% of residents were under the age of 18 and 19.4% of residents were 65 years of age or older. For every 100 females there were 96.8 males, and for every 100 females age 18 and over there were 93.9 males age 18 and over.

100.0% of residents lived in urban areas, while 0.0% lived in rural areas.

There were 1,850 households in Terrell Hills, of which 37.9% had children under the age of 18 living in them. Of all households, 69.1% were married-couple households, 10.9% were households with a male householder and no spouse or partner present, and 17.4% were households with a female householder and no spouse or partner present. About 17.6% of all households were made up of individuals and 10.5% had someone living alone who was 65 years of age or older.

There were 1,993 housing units, of which 7.2% were vacant. The homeowner vacancy rate was 2.9% and the rental vacancy rate was 12.6%.

Racial composition as of the 2020 census
Race	Number	Percent
White	4,052	80.3%
Black or African American	47	0.9%
American Indian and Alaska Native	28	0.6%
Asian	100	2.0%
Native Hawaiian and Other Pacific Islander	2	0.0%
Some other race	153	3.0%
Two or more races	663	13.1%
Hispanic or Latino (of any race)	887	17.6%

=== 2000 census ===
As of the census of 2000, the city had a resident population of 5,019 persons, with a corresponding population density of 1,167.4/km^{2} (3,032.6/sq mi). Of this population, 95.40% identified themselves as White, 0.52% as African American, 0.16% as Native American, 0.22% as Asian, 0.02% as Pacific Islander, 2.39% as "some other race", and 1.30% as belonging to two or more races. In addition, 11.68% of the population identified themselves as being of Hispanic, Latino, or Spanish origin of any race.

There were a total of 2,011 housing units in the city, 1,913 of which were occupied and consequently counted as census households; the city had no group quarters. Of these 1,913 households, 1,410 (73.7%) were classified as family households; 36.6% of these families included the householder's own minor children (that is, children less than 18 years old). Of the total households, 32.6% were married-couple families with their own minor children, 31.9% were married-couple families without their own minor children, 3.8% were families headed by a female householder with no husband present but with the householder's own minor children present, and 3.4% were families headed by a female householder with only relatives other than her husband or minor children present. Finally, 12.3% of households consisted of a single individual living alone of more than 65 years of age and 10.4% of a single individual living alone of less than 65 years of age; 3.6% were other non-family households. The average household size was 2.62 persons and the average family size was 3.09 persons.

Persons under 18 years of age comprised 28.2% of the city's population; those aged 18 to 24, 3.7%; 25 to 44, 25.0%; 45 to 64, 26.1%; and those over 65 years of age, 17.1%. The median age was 42 years. Out of all age groups, there were 88.3 males for every 100 females; out of all those of at least 18 years of age, there were 85.7 males for every 100 females.

The median household income for the city was $79,295, and the median family income was $86,636. The median income for individual male year-round workers was $61,743; for like females, it was $40,956. Per capita income was $45,134. The Census Bureau classified 4.7% of the city's population, and 3.2% of its families, as living below the poverty line. In terms of age, 6.1% of those under the age of 18 and 2.4% of those over the age of 65 were living below the poverty line. The median home price in 2005 in Terrell Hills was $583,500.

== Education ==
Most residents are zoned to the Alamo Heights Independent School District. Howard Early Childhood Center in San Antonio, Woodridge Elementary School in San Antonio, Alamo Heights Junior High School in San Antonio, and Alamo Heights High School in Alamo Heights serve Terrell Hills.

A small portion of Terrell Hills is served by the North East Independent School District. The portion is served by: Wilshire Elementary School, Garner Middle School, and MacArthur High School, all in San Antonio.

== Notable people ==
- Christopher Cross, Grammy winning singer-songwriter
- Tommy Lee Jones, 1993 Academy Award-winning actor

== See also ==
- List of municipalities in Texas
