= Nelson Wolff =

American politician (born 1940)

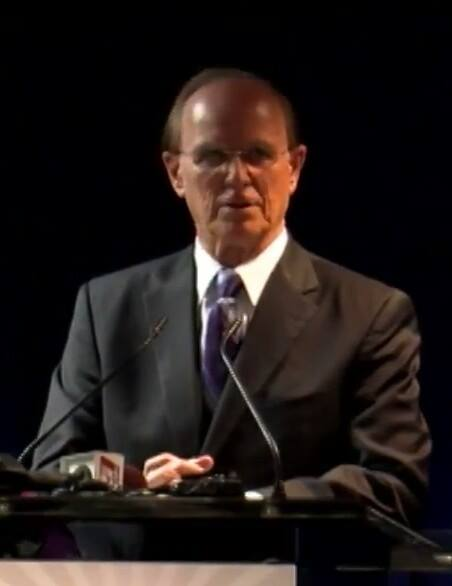

Bexar County Judge
- In office 2001 – December 31, 2022
- Preceded by: Cyndi Taylor Krier
- Succeeded by: Peter Sakai

Mayor of San Antonio
- In office June 1, 1991 – June 1, 1995
- Preceded by: Lila Cockrell
- Succeeded by: Bill Thornton

Member of the San Antonio City Council
- In office 1987–1991
- Succeeded by: Bill Thornton
- Constituency: 8th district

Member of the Texas Senate from the 26th district
- In office 1973–1975

Member of the Texas House of Representatives from the Bexar County district
- In office 1971–1973

Personal details
- Born: October 27, 1940 (age 85)
- Party: Democratic
- Spouse(s): Melinda Wolff (m. 1961–1988) Tracy Hoag (m. 1989)
- Children: 4
- Education: St. Mary's University (BBA, JD)

Nelson William Wolff (born October 27, 1940) is a retired American judge and Democratic politician from San Antonio, Texas. He represented Bexar County in the Texas House of Representatives from 1971 to 1973 and the Texas Senate from 1973 to 1975. He served on the San Antonio City Council from 1987 to 1991 and then as mayor of San Antonio from 1991 to 1995. He served as Bexar county judge from 2001 until December 31, 2022.

== Early life and education ==
Wolff was born and raised in San Antonio. He earned a Bachelor of Business administration from St. Mary's University and a Juris Doctor from the St. Mary's University School of Law.

== Career ==
Wolff is only the second person to serve as both San Antonio mayor and county judge of Bexar County. (The first was Bryan Callaghan, Jr., who became mayor in 1885 and county judge in 1892.)

With his late father and two brothers, he owned several businesses, most notably Sun Harvest Farms grocery stores and Green Fields Market, a health foods and organic grocery store in San Antonio, which Wolff sold in 2011.

Wolff has penned five books. In Challenge of Change, he describes his experience in the Texas legislature and his participation in the 1974 Constitutional Convention, of which he was instrumental in bringing about. In Baseball for Real Men, Wolff reflects on life and his love of the game. Mayor is a memoir of San Antonio politics focusing on his time in City Hall. In Transforming San Antonio (Trinity University Press) Wolff gives an insider's view on signature economic-development projects with which he was involved: the AT&T Center, a Toyota factory, the PGA Village, and the extension of the San Antonio River Walk. He also authored the book 95 Power Principles: Strategies for Effective Leadership in Government, which documents the lessons learned over his decades in public service and in business.

Wolff was initially appointed to this current position in 2001 to succeed Cyndi Taylor Krier, a Republican, who resigned to accept an appointment from then Governor Rick Perry as a regent of the University of Texas System. Wolff has since been elected to this position three times. In January 2012, he announced that he would seek a fourth full term in 2014. He defeated in the general election the Republican candidate, Carlton L. Soules, a former member of the San Antonio City Council from the North Side. Known as a "budget hawk" while on the council, Soules since entered into an alliance with the unsuccessful 2017 San Antonio mayoral candidate Manuel Medina, the chairman of the Bexar County Democratic Party organization. The two had opposed a defunct a downtown street car project, which they considered a "boondoggle."

Wolff won re-election as county judge in the general election held on November 6, 2018. He defeated the Republican nominee, Probate Judge Tom Rickhoff.

In October 2021, Wolff announced that he would not seek re-election for the position of county judge.

== Personal life ==
Since 1989, Wolff has been married to his second spouse, the former Tracy Hoag. He has four children from the first marriage to Melinda Wolff: Kevin Alan, Lyn Marie, Scott, and Matthew. He has two stepchildren through the second marriage. His oldest son from his first marriage, Kevin Wolff (born c. 1965), a Republican, served with his father on the Bexar County Commissioners' Court as the Precinct three commissioner until 2021. The two disagreed over a downtown streetcar plan favored by the father and adamantly opposed by the son. They agreed on a proposal to build a rail system with the use of eighteen miles of existing Union Pacific track from downtown San Antonio to Leon Springs.

The Nelson W. Wolff Municipal Stadium, home field of the San Antonio Missions located off U.S. Highway 90 near the intersection with State Highway 151, is named in his honor.

Preceded by Lila Cockrell	Mayor of San Antonio, Texas; 1991–1995	Succeeded by Bill Thornton
Preceded by Glenn Kothmann	Member of the Texas House of Representatives from District 57-8 (San Antonio); 1971–1973	Succeeded by Inactive district
Preceded by Joe J. Bernal	Texas State Senator from District 26 (San Antonio); 1973–1975	Succeeded by Frank Lombardino
Preceded by Cyndi Taylor Krier	Bexar County Judge; 2001–	Succeeded by Incumbent
