= Hondo High School =

Public school in Texas, United States

Location
- 2603 Ave H Hondo, Texas 78861; United States; 29.34148°N 99.13569°W

Information
- School type: Public High School
- School district: Hondo Independent School District
- Principal: Tammy Neuman
- Teaching staff: 46.27 (FTE)
- Grades: 9-12
- Enrollment: 518 (2023-2024)
- Student to teacher ratio: 11.20
- Colors: Navy Blue & White
- Athletics conference: UIL Class AAA
- Mascot: Owl
- Newspaper: The Owl's Nest
- Website: Hondo High School

Hondo High School is a public high school located in Hondo, Texas (USA). It is part of the Hondo Independent School District located in central Medina County and classified as a 3A school by the UIL. Hondo ISD was established in 1904 and the first high school building built in 1904. In 2015, the school was rated "Met Standard" by the Texas Education Agency.

Its boundary includes Hondo and Yancey.

== History ==
The Hondo School District was organized in 1883 and became an independent district in 1904. In 1904, a six-room two-story building was built with an $8,000 bond. The building received an addition with a $10,000 bond for three additional rooms and an auditorium upstairs. In 1927 the 2nd floor was removed and the remaining one-story building was covered in white stucco. In the 1930s, the school received more additions with the Lacey School, two-story administration building, and a gymnasium. In the mid-1970s the Lacey School and the two-story administration building were demolished to make way for a track. In 1974, the gymnasium was retrofit to house the high school band program and a divider wall built to create a space for the wood shop class. The original high school building was constructed in 1904; it was demolished in May, 2020. It was used as the Mighty Owl Band Hall from the 1970s to 2020. In 1950 a new high school was constructed and after several renovations and additions it is still in use today. In 2017, a new gymnasium was constructed as well as a new Career and Technologies building. In 2020, a new Fine Arts Building was constructed and includes two Band Halls, and auditorium, dressing rooms, a scene shop, and an art room.

== Athletics ==
The Hondo Owls compete in these sports -

Cross Country, Volleyball, Football, Basketball, Powerlifting, Golf, Team Tennis, Tennis, Track and Field, Softball and Baseball. Hondo High School intends to start a Soccer program in the 2021-2022 school year.

=== State titles ===
- Boys Cross Country -
  - 1980(3A), 1981(3A)

==== State finalists ====
- Football -
  - 1956(1A)

==== State Qualifiers ====
Golf - 2021 (4A)

Track - 2021 (4A)

Girls Cross Country - 2024 (3A)

== Fine Arts ==
Band, Theater, and Art

Mighty Owl Band - Established 1951

The Band is a UIL Sweepstakes winner and has a 36 year streak of 1st Division Marching Awards. The Band is 10 time State Qualifier and were the 1983 class 3A State Champions.

=== Area Champions ===
2022 - 3A AREA E Marching Contest - 1st Place, Area Champions

=== State Champions ===
1983 - 1st Place State Marching Band division 3A

==== State Finalists ====
1981 - 3rd place in State Marching Band division 3A

1983 - 1st place in State Marching Band division 3A

1994 - 4th place in State Marching Band division 3A

2025 - 6th place in State Marching Band division 3A

==== State Qualifiers ====
1980 - State Marching Band Qualifier division 3A

1981 - State Marching Band Qualifier division 3A

1983 - State Marching Band Qualifier division 3A

1984 - State Marching Band Qualifier division 3A

1985 - State Marching Band Qualifier division 3A

1994 - State Marching Band Qualifier division 3A

2020 - State Marching Band Qualifier division 4A

2021 - State Marching Band Qualifier division 4A

2023 - State Marching Band Qualifier division 3A

2024 - State Marching Band Qualifier division 3A

2025 - State Marching Band Qualifier division 3A

2026 - State Marching Band Qualifier division 3A
