= John W. Goode =

American lawyer

John William Goode Jr.
- Born: March 10, 1923; San Antonio, Texas, U.S.
- Died: February 5, 1994 (aged 70); San Antonio, Texas, U.S.
- Education: Jefferson High School Washington and Lee University; University of Texas at Austin University of Texas School of Law
- Occupation: Lawyer
- Political party: Republican
- Spouse: Janet Irwin Goode (m. 1949)
- Children: John W. Goode III; George Irwin Goode
- Awards: Bronze Star; Silver Star in World War II

John William Goode Jr. (March 10, 1923 – February 5, 1994) was a lawyer in San Antonio who was a figure in the 1950s and 1960s rebirth of the Republican Party in Texas.

== Background ==
Goode was a son of the physician John Goode Sr. (1886–1959) and the former Claudia Alice Nolte (1895–1969). In 1939, shortly after his sixteenth birthday, he graduated from Thomas Jefferson High School. He attended Washington and Lee University in Lexington, Virginia, for three years from 1939 to 1942, ultimately receiving his bachelor's degree in 1943 from the University of Texas at Austin.

== Military ==
During World War II, Goode served in the United States Marine Corps as a combat infantry platoon leader and executive officer in the South Pacific battles of Cape Gloucester, New Britain, Peleliu, and Okinawa. In the two latter battles, he was wounded. He was honorably discharged in 1945 at the rank of captain. At Peleliu, as a second lieutenant, he received the Silver Star for courageous actions on September 27, 1944. When his platoon encountered the Japanese on a hill, Goode brought forward a machine-gun section. He pushed through hostile machine-gun and rifle fire which had already caused the death of one of his men and the wounding of two others. Twenty enemy soldiers were killed. Later in the day, Goode again braved hostile fire but managed to return to his support squad. His calm under hostile action and leadership in battle were determined to have saved the lives of many of his men. His superiors concluded that Goode's "gallant devotion to duty reflects great credit on [him] and the United States Naval Service." Goode received the Bronze Star and a Presidential Unit Citation.

== Family ==
In 1949, Goode married the former Janet Irwin, who died prior to 2003. The couple's two sons were John III and George Irwin Goode, who predeceased his father. Goode III, known as "Grizzly" or "Johnny", was an artist and graphic designer who worked in the restaurant and nightclub business in San Antonio and was a state judo champion.

Goode's sister, Eleanor Goode Brune (1927–2005), served as the national committeewoman of the Young Republican Federation of Texas from 1950 to 1956. Like her brother, she was a UT graduate. She also attended the Worden School of Social Work at Our Lady of the Lake University in San Antonio and was active in social work programs, having organized the Volunteer Service Bureau and worked with blind children. She retired to the rural but historic Crowell community in Foard County in West Texas. Eleanor's husband and Goode's brother-in-law, David H. Brune (1930–2007), a native of California, was in legal partnership with Goode from 1958 to 1962.

== Law and politics ==
After the war, Goode completed his studies in 1948 at the University of Texas School of Law. For two-and-a-half years, he was acting first assistant district attorney in the office of the Bexar County District Attorney. He entered private practice thereafter and was involved during the course of his legal career in several firms, beginning with Hardy & Goode and ending with Goode, Casseb & Jones, now Goode, Casseb, Jones, Riklin, Choate & Watson. "He was so devoted to his law practice that, it was his hobby. ... He enjoyed corporate law and not the glamorous criminal law as much, although he did do some criminal cases," recalled his son, John W. Goode III.

Goode worked on the successful Dwight D. Eisenhower presidential campaign in 1952. He was a chairman of the San Antonio Municipal Civil Service Commission, and he was a Republican county chairman. He was a delegate to the 1960 Republican National Convention held in Chicago to nominate the unsuccessful Nixon-Lodge ticket. In November 1961, he was the Republican candidate in a special election for the United States House of Representatives for Texas's 20th congressional district but was defeated by the Democrat, Henry B. Gonzalez, the first Hispanic to serve in both the Texas State Senate and as a member of Congress from Texas. Goode had been hopeful of a political upset after former president Dwight Eisenhower flew to San Antonio to campaign with Goode. The candidate also received support from a Conservative Democratic group. Mexican film star Cantinflas appeared with Vice President Lyndon B. Johnson at San Antonio shopping centers and supermarkets to rally voters for Gonzalez.

Earlier that same year in the spring of 1961, Gonzalez had lost out in another special election for the United States Senate seat formerly held by Vice President Johnson. Victory in that race went in a major upset to John Tower, the first Republican to represent Texas in the upper legislative chamber in the 20th century.

In November 1993, three months before his death, Goode was inducted into the Bexar County Republican Party's newly established Hall of Fame. Goode was active in several civic organizations and fraternities, including the Texas Cavaliers, Texas Law Foundation, the San Antonio Bar Association, and the Order of the Alamo.

Goode died in San Antonio a month prior to his 71st birthday.
