= Lila Cockrell =

American politician (1922–2019)

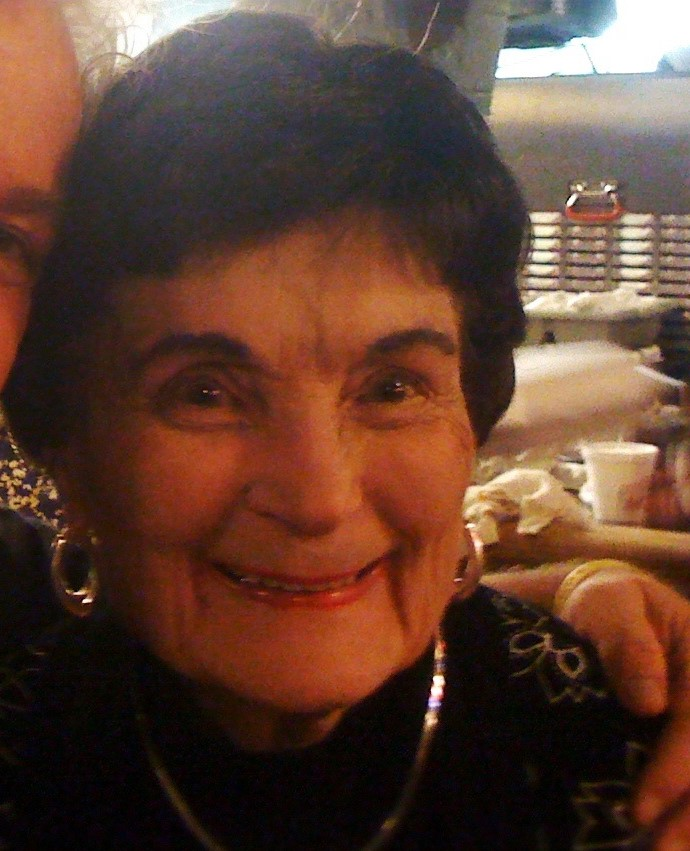

172nd and 174th Mayor of San Antonio
- In office June 1, 1989 – June 1, 1991
- Preceded by: Henry Cisneros
- Succeeded by: Nelson Wolff
- In office May 1, 1975 – May 1, 1981
- Preceded by: Charles L. Becker
- Succeeded by: Henry Cisneros

San Antonio City Councilwoman
- In office 1973–1975
- In office 1963–1970

Personal details
- Born: Lila May Banks; January 19, 1922 Fort Worth, Texas, U.S.
- Died: August 29, 2019 (aged 97) San Antonio, Texas, U.S.
- Party: Republican
- Spouse: Sidney Earl Cockrell Jr. (m. 1941; died 1986)
- Children: 2
- Education: Southern Methodist University

Military service
- Allegiance: United States
- Branch/service: United States Navy; WAVES
- Rank: Ensign
- Battles/wars: World War II

Lila May Banks Cockrell (January 19, 1922 – August 29, 2019) was an American politician who served twice as mayor of San Antonio, Texas. During World War II, she served in the WAVES branch of the United States Navy. She served as President of the Dallas and San Antonio chapters of the League of Women Voters during the 1950s.

== Political career ==
After serving for a decade on the city council, including her 1969 service as the city's first woman mayor Pro Tem, Cockrell was elected in 1975 to the first of four two-year terms as Mayor of San Antonio. At the time of her inauguration, San Antonio's population gave her the status of the mayor over the largest American city being governed by a woman. She is often listed as the first woman in the United States to be elected mayor of a major metropolis. However, Bertha Knight Landes was mayor of Seattle 1926–1928. Cockrell's first three terms ran consecutively 1975–1981. At the end of her third term, she chose not to run because of the illness of her husband Sidney Earl Cockrell Jr. She was succeeded by Henry Cisneros. Widowed in 1986, she was elected to her fourth term as mayor in 1989 when Cisneros left office. Lila Cockrell was a registered Republican.

== Retirement ==
After retiring from political office, Cockrell served on many municipal commissions and civic boards. In 2013, she retired as president of the San Antonio Parks Foundation, a position she had held since 1998.

On May 29, 2019, Cockrell was forbidden to vote in the 2019 San Antonio mayoral election because she lacked the required identification under Texas ID laws. Many people in the San Antonio community as well as politicians such as Pete Buttigieg were outraged that Cockrell was forbidden to cast her ballot. The incident started up a controversy about Texas voter ID laws. On May 31, 2019, Cockrell cast her vote in the election.

=== Death ===
Cockrell's Health declined in the time leading up to her death. Cockrell died at the age of 97 under hospice care on August 29, 2019 in her apartment in San Antonio, Texas. On September 3, 2019, a public visitation was held at Mission Park Funeral Chapel North. On September 5, 2019, a private memorial service and a public tribute were held at the Lila Cockrell Theatre.

== Honors ==
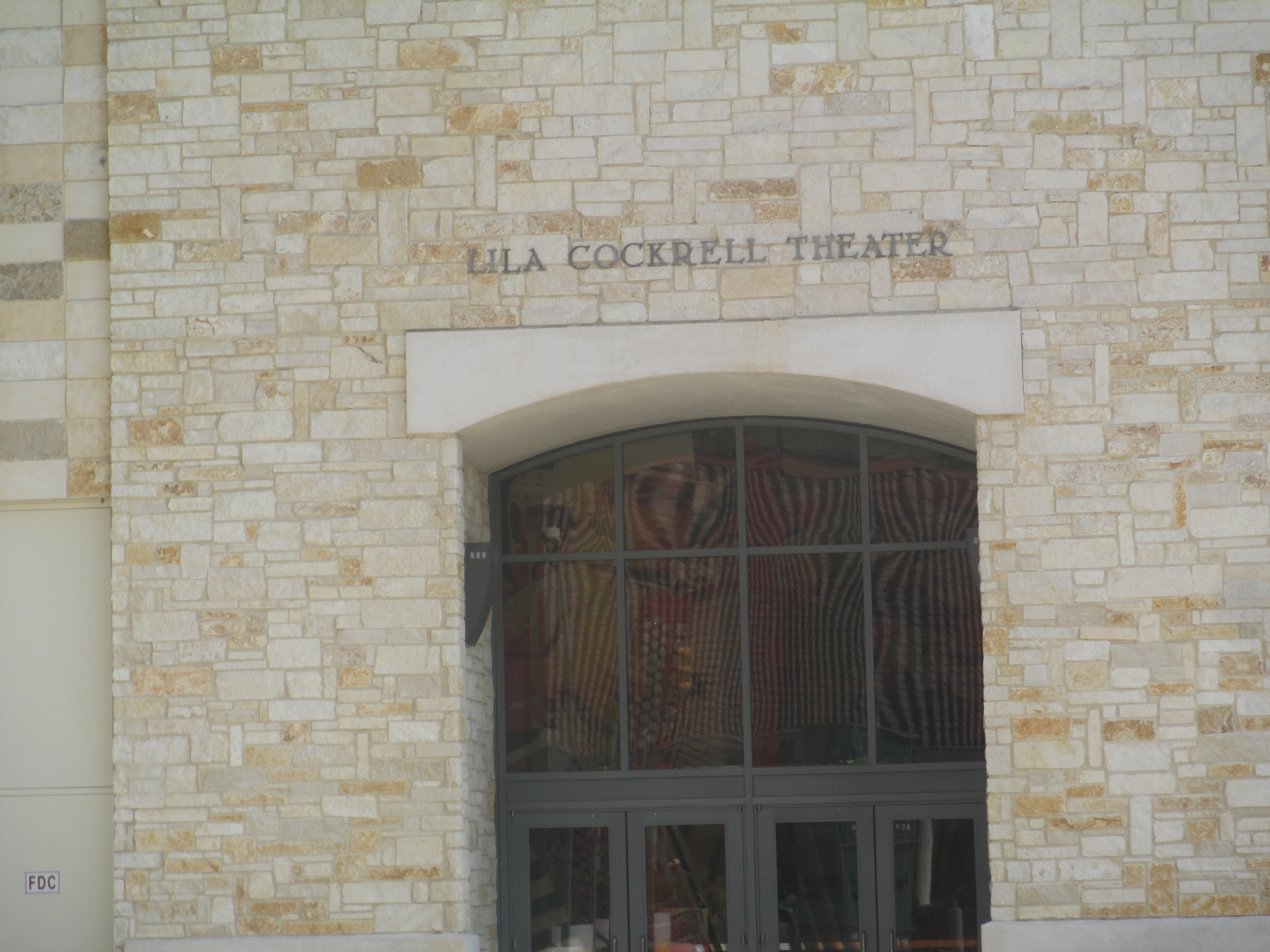
Lila Cockrell Theater in San Antonio, Texas

- The Lila Cockrell Theatre, named in her honor, is part of the Henry B. González Convention Center in Downtown San Antonio. Also, a meeting room at the Convention Center directly below the Theatre is named the Mayor Cockrell Room in her honor.
- She was inducted into the Texas Women's Hall of Fame in 1984.
- She received an honorary doctorate from St. Mary's University in May 2017 during the commencement ceremony for the class of 2017.

== See also ==
- Timeline of San Antonio, 1950s–1990s

Preceded by Henry Cisneros	Mayor of San Antonio; 1989-1991	Succeeded by Nelson Wolff
Preceded by Charles L. Becker	Mayor of San Antonio; 1975-1981	Succeeded by Henry G. Cisneros
