= Thomas Jefferson High School (San Antonio) =

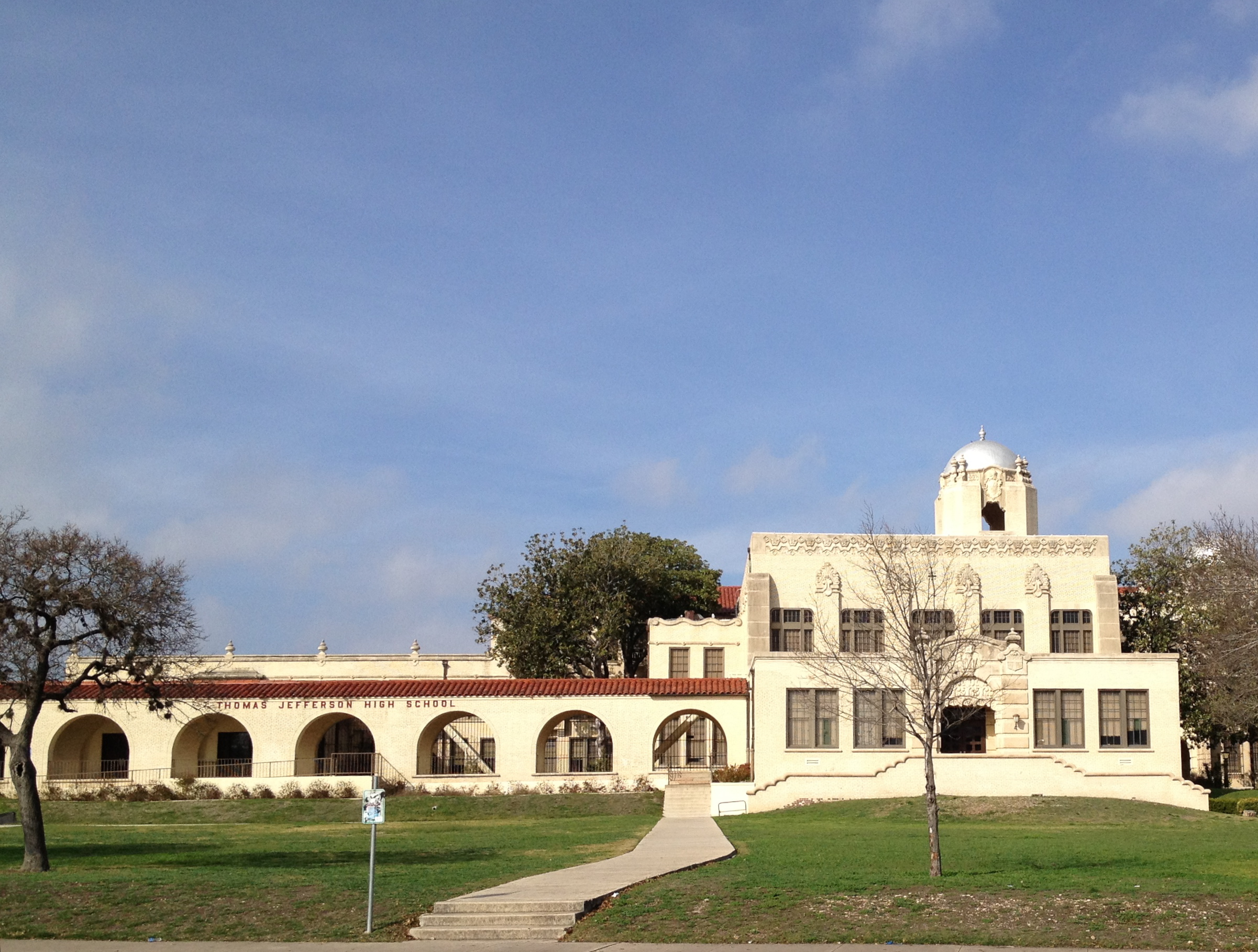
- Thomas Jefferson High School building

Location
- 723 Donaldson Avenue; San Antonio, Bexar County, Texas 78201; United States; 29°27′55″N 98°32′17″W

Information
- School type: Public, High School
- Motto: "In Omni Uno!"
- Founded: 1932
- Locale: City: Large
- School district: San Antonio ISD
- NCES School ID: 483873004368
- Principal: Gregory Rivers
- Faculty: 117.12 (on an FTE basis)ref name="NCES"/>
- Grades: 9–12
- Enrollment: 1,686 (2022–2023)
- Student to teacher ratio: 14.40
- Colors: Red, White and Blue
- Nickname: Mustangs
- Newspaper: The Declaration
- Website: www.saisd.net/o/jefferson
- Thomas Jefferson High School
- U.S. National Register of Historic Places
- Recorded Texas Historic Landmark
- Built: 1932
- Architectural style: Mission/Spanish Revival
- NRHP reference No.: 83003093
- RTHL No.: 5470

Significant dates
- Added to NRHP: September 22, 1983
- Designated: June 29, 1983
- Designated RTHL: 1983

Thomas Jefferson High School is a public high school in San Antonio, Texas and is one of ten high schools in the San Antonio Independent School District. Completed in 1932 at a cost of $1,250,000, it was the third high school built in the city. During 2022–2023, Jefferson High School had an enrollment of 1,686 students and a student to teacher ratio of 14.40. The school received an overall rating of "B" from the Texas Education Agency for the 2024–2025 school year.

== History ==
The SAISD school board paid $94,588.75 to buy "Spanish Acres," a 32-acre (13 ha) property, to develop the third high school in San Antonio. Construction began in the fall of 1930 and ended in January 1932. It was built for over $1.25 million.

In 1983 it became a part of the National Register of Historic Places. It was also designated a Texas historic landmark.

== Campus and architecture ==
The school was designed by the company Adams and Adams. The entrance has two towers of different heights and is designed in the Baroque style. The towers are topped with silver. The school uses wrought-iron balconies and Spanish-tiled roofing. The school has two courtyards, both landscaped, bordered by portales. One courtyard has a hexagonal pond with decorative tiling. Hannibal and Eugene Pianta, an Italian immigrant and his son, decorated the main entrance columns and balconies with cast-stone ornamentation. Jay C. Henry, the author of Architecture in Texas: 1895-1945, stated that the architecture is similar to that of Lubbock High School.

In 1938 the school had an armory, a cafeteria, a drill ground, two gymnasiums, and a theater.

A music facility and the East Wing, a three-story addition, were built at a later time.

Its Moorish/Spanish architecture make it a visually distinct element in what was the old Woodlawn district.

== Recognition ==
In 1983 Jefferson was listed on the National Register of Historic Places. In 1995, it was included in the Local Historic District by the City of San Antonio. In 2010, Jefferson was selected as Grammy Signature Award Winner.

== Demographics ==
The demographic breakdown of the 1,829 students enrolled in 2012-2013 was:

- Male - 52.7%
- Female - 47.3%
- Native American/Alaskan - 0.1%
- Asian/Pacific islanders - 0.2%
- Black - 2.1%
- Hispanic - 95.4%
- White - 2.1%
- Multiracial - 0.1%

86.6% of the students were eligible for free or reduced lunch.

In 1938 the school had 2,394 students. At the time over 60% of the students were scheduled to matriculate to universities and colleges. In addition there were 89 teachers, including 56 female teachers. The student-teacher ratio at the time was 25 to 1.

== Student life ==
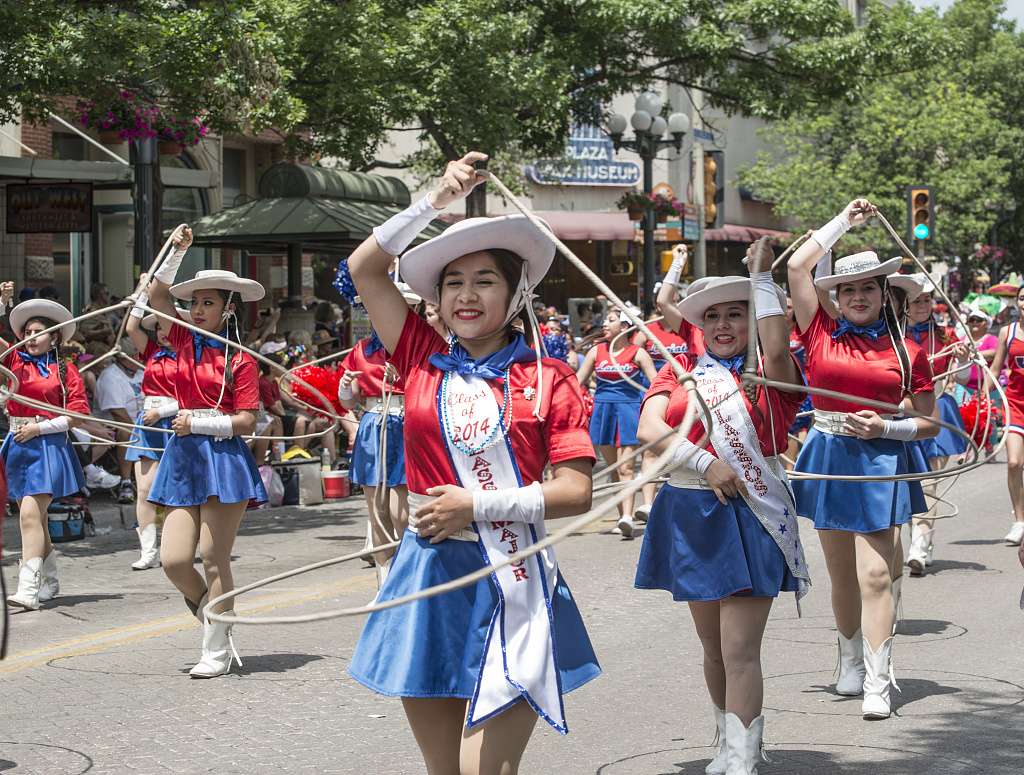
Lassos at the Fiesta Battle of Flowers Parade

In 1938 the school had an ROTC unit, multiple school-recognized clubs including the girls' pep squad "Lassos", and fraternities and sororities unrecognized by the school. As of 1938 the "Lassos" were made up of 150 female students.

In 1938 the ROTC had 33 student officers, all male; each were allowed to choose a female student to accompany him.

The 1940 Twentieth Century Fox film High School used exteriors and back-projection footage shot at TJHS.

== Athletics ==
The Jefferson Mustangs compete in the following sports:

- Baseball
- Basketball
- Cross Country
- Football
- Golf
- Soccer
- Softball
- Swimming and Diving
- Tennis
- Track and Field
- Volleyball

== Notable alumni ==
=== Athletics ===
- Rick Bullock, All-American basketball player, Texas Tech University
- Ruth Lessing, All-American Girls Professional Baseball League
- Corky Nelson, football coach, University of North Texas
- Tommy Nobis, All American football player, University of Texas; 5-time Pro Bowl selection for Atlanta Falcons
- Gabriel Rivera, All American football player, Texas Tech University
- Kyle Rote, All American football player, Southern Methodist University; 4-time Pro Bowl selection for New York Giants

=== Arts and entertainment ===
- Ben Dorcy (1925–2017), first roadie to be inducted into the Roadies Hall of Fame in 2009
- Holly Dunn, country music artist
- Philip Krumm, composer and pioneer of modal, repetitive pattern music
- Chris Pérez, Grammy Award-winning artist
- "Blue" Gene Tyranny, avant-garde composer and pianist

=== Communications ===
- Jim Lehrer, television journalist, MacNeil/Lehrer Report, PBS
- Allen Ludden, television personality

=== Education ===
- John Silber, President, Boston University

=== Government ===
- John H. Wood, Jr. (deceased), Federal Judge
- Ed Garza, former mayor of the City of San Antonio
- Julian Castro, United States Secretary of Housing and Urban Development, former mayor of the City of San Antonio
- Joaquin Castro, United States House of Representatives and represented Texas's 20th congressional district in the United States House of Representatives since 2013 and currently sits on the United States House Committee on Foreign Affairs and the United States House Permanent Select Committee on Intelligence.
- Henry B. Gonzalez (deceased) Class of 1935, former United States congressman. The San Antonio Convention Center is named after him.
- John W. Goode (deceased) (Class of 1939), lawyer and Republican political figure of the 1950s and 1960s
- Leticia Van de Putte, former Texas state senator
- George C. Windrow, member of the Wisconsin Assembly

Diego Bernal State Representative, Texas House District 123 - Feb 2015–Present City Council District 1 (class of 1996)

=== Law ===
- Gus Garcia, class of 1932, first Valedictorian, went on to argue anti-segregation cases at the Supreme Court, notably the Hernandez v Texas case that argued for the inclusion of Mexican-American's in jury selection, under the argument of Equal Representation Under the Law.

=== Military ===
- Lt. Col. Robert G. Cole (deceased), a Commander in the Invasion of Normandy, World War II, Medal of Honor recipient; Cole High School is named for him
- Major Gen. Alfred Valenzuela, commanded the U.S. Army South (USARSO) at Fort Buchanan, Puerto Rico.

=== Philanthropy ===
- Edith McAllister, San Antonio civic leader and philanthropist

=== Physical science ===
- Aaron Cohen, former NASA Deputy Director
- Robert Floyd Curl, Jr., Nobel Prize in Chemistry in 1996
- William E. Moerner, Nobel Prize in Chemistry in 2014
