= South Texas Regional Airport at Hondo =

- IATA: none; ICAO: KHDO; FAA LID: HDO

Summary
- Airport type: Public
- Owner: City of Hondo
- Serves: Hondo, Texas
- Elevation AMSL: 930 ft / 283 m
- Coordinates: 29°21′33″N 099°10′39″W

Map
- Location of airport in Texas

Runways
Direction	Length		Surface
Direction	ft	m	Surface
8/26	3,451	1,052	Concrete
13/31	5,545	1,690	Concrete
17L/35R	6,002	1,829	Concrete
17R/35L	3,224	983	Asphalt

Statistics (2023)
- Aircraft operations (year ending 5/31/2023): 25,000
- Based aircraft: 76
- Sources: FAA, City of Hondo

Hondo Army Airfield 1943 Classbook

South Texas Regional Airport at Hondo (ICAO: KHDO, FAA LID: HDO) is a public-use airport located two nautical miles (4 km) northwest of the central business district of Hondo, a city in Medina County, Texas, United States. It is owned by the City of Hondo and was formerly known as Hondo Municipal Airport. This airport is included in the National Plan of Integrated Airport Systems for 2011–2015, which categorized it as a general-aviation facility.

== Facilities and aircraft ==
South Texas Regional Airport at Hondo covers an area of 2,400 acres (971 ha) at an elevation of 930 feet (283 m) above mean sea level. It has four runways: 8/26 is 3,451 by 75 feet (1,052 x 23 m), 13/31 is 5,545 by 150 feet (1,690 x 46 m), 17L/35R is 6,002 by 100 feet (1,829 x 30 m), and 17R/35L is 3,224 by 140 feet (983 x 43 m). Runway 17L/35R has an asphalt pavement and the remaining three runways have a concrete surface.

For the 12-month period ending May 31, 2023, the airport had 25,000 general-aviation aircraft operations, an average of 68 per day. At that time, 76 aircraft were based at this airport: 66 single-engined, five multi-engined, and one jet airplanes, and four helicopter, .

== History ==
=== Hondo Army Air Field ===
The airport has its origins in 1942 with the establishment by the Army Air Corps of Hondo Army Air Field, and was used as a navigator training base. The Women Airforce Service Pilots (WASPs) squadrons were assigned there in November 1943. Two notable woman pilots, Betty Henrich and Hollywood stunt actress Mary Wiggins, were among the first WASPs to report for duty. Between July 1942 and August 1945, some 14,158 navigators were trained at Hondo. The base was closed on December 29, 1945, and the buildings and fixtures were sold as surplus.

Between 1945 and 1951, civilian operators such as the Hollaway Flying School trained student pilots at the former base under the GI Bill.

=== Hondo Air Base ===
On June 5, 1950, as a result of the Korean War, the United States Air Force reactivated the base as Hondo Air Base, and it served as a contract pilot-training center. It closed again in 1958.

During the 1960s, the city of Hondo leased facilities at the base to the Hondo Livestock Auction and to Gary Aerospace, Universal Rundle, and Doss Aviation. The aviation companies worked with the Air Force to screen pilots, and Universal Rundle manufactured bathroom products.

In 1957, a golf course was constructed on the base through the efforts of base commander Lieutenant Colonel Earl V. Riley. A golf tournament bearing his name remained a yearly event in the 1980s. In the spring of 1973, the Air Force began a flight-screening program at Hondo using the T-41 Mescalero, a militarized version of the civilian Cessna 172. The training program, still in operation in the 1980s, was attended by United States and foreign students.

After the mid-1970s, the base housed a number of businesses, including a fiberglass-products plant, a greenhouse, a National Guard armory, and the Medina Electric Cooperative.

== See also ==
- List of airports in Texas
