= Edward D. Garza =

American politician

Ed Garza
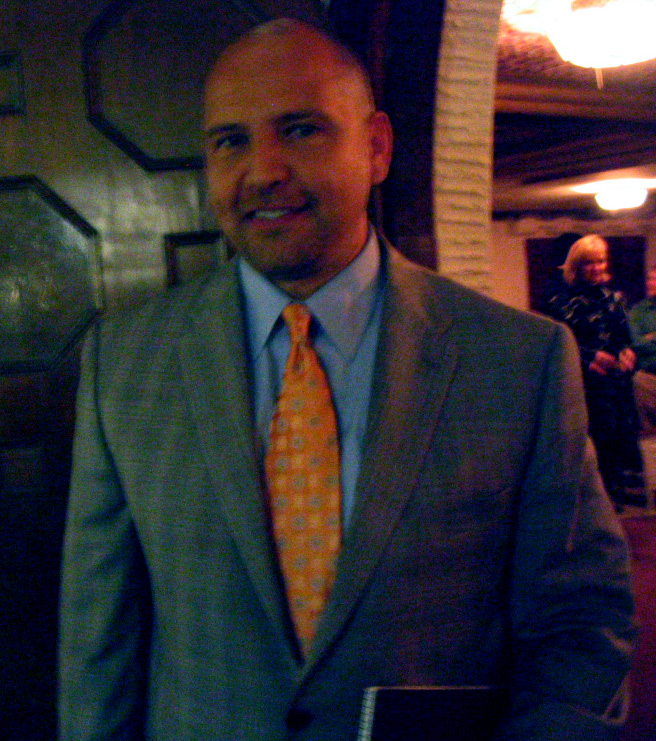

Mayor of San Antonio
- In office June 1, 2001 – June 7, 2005
- Preceded by: Howard W. Peak
- Succeeded by: Phil Hardberger

Member of the San Antonio City Council from the 7th district
- Succeeded by: Julian Castro

Personal details
- Born: 1969 (age 56–57) San Antonio, Texas, U.S.
- Party: Democratic
- Spouse: Anna Garza
- Education: Texas A&M University, College Station (BS, MS)

Edward D. Garza (born 1969), is an American politician and a professional urban planner. From 2001 to 2005, he served as mayor of San Antonio, Texas. Elected at the age of 32, he is the youngest person to become mayor of San Antonio and only the second person of Hispanic descent to hold the office since the election of Henry Cisneros in 1981.

== Biography ==
=== Early life and education ===
A native of San Antonio, Garza graduated from Thomas Jefferson High School in 1986. He attended the University of Texas at Austin studying Business Administration for two years before transferring to Texas A&M University in College Station, where he earned a Bachelor of Science in Landscape Architecture in 1992 and a Master of Science in Land Development in 1994.

=== Career ===
In 2010, Garza was the president and CEO of the urban development and investment firm Zane Garway. He was previously a principal in the firm AECOM. Garza has also held adjunct professor positions at the University of Texas at San Antonio and St. Mary's University.

Garza's political career includes two terms on the San Antonio City Council, two terms as Mayor of San Antonio, and as of 2009, a trustee of the San Antonio Independent School District.

Though a Democrat, all of Garza's offices have thus far been nonpartisan. In 2010, Garza endorsed the reelection of Republican Governor Rick Perry in the November 2 general election against the Democratic nominee, Bill White, former mayor of Houston and former state party chairman.

=== Personal life ===
Edward and Anna Laura Garza married in 2001.

== Awards and recognition ==
- 2004: Distinguished Alumni Award, College of Architecture at Texas A&M University
- 2011: Named to Advisory Board of academic coaching program iCue Network
