= Bill Thornton =

American politician from Texas

Dr. Bill Thornton DDS, MSD

Mayor of San Antonio
- In office June 1, 1995 – May 31, 1997
- Preceded by: Nelson Wolff
- Succeeded by: Howard Peak

Member of the San Antonio City Council for the 8th District
- In office June 1, 1991 – May 31, 1995
- Preceded by: Nelson Wolff

Personal details
- Born: Abilene, Texas, U.S.
- Education: Trinity University

William E. Thornton is an American politician who served as the mayor of San Antonio, Texas from 1995 to 1997. He succeeded Nelson Wolff and was himself followed by Howard Peak, after Thornton finished third in his bid for reelection. Thornton also served as a member of the San Antonio City Council for district 8. During the 1997 mayoral election, public relations consultant T. J. Connolly defected from Thornton to Peak's campaign and was subsequently reported to the police for stalking Thornton and his wife. The incident was investigated by the police found no basis for the charge. Connolly describes the incident as "a cold, calculated, well-planned political move". Thornton was a noted proponent for proposals to restore and expand San Antonio's historic center in the area around the Alamo, as well as a supporter of tax abatements to promote tourism through the construction of new hotels. His term as mayor was marked by tension between the mayor and members of the city council (including his ultimate successor Howard Peak).

Thornton was born in Abilene, Texas. He moved to San Antonio in 1963 to attend Trinity University. Two years later, he moved to Dallas to attend dental school, before returning to San Antonio in 1972. He has a doctoral degree in dental surgery from Texas A&M University Baylor College of Dentistry. Thornton's professional career was as an oral surgeon. As of October 2015, Thornton and his wife were living in Manhattan.;
