= Howard W. Peak =

American politician (1948–2024)

Mayor of San Antonio
- In office June 1, 1997 – May 31, 2001
- Preceded by: Bill Thornton
- Succeeded by: Edward D. Garza

Member of the San Antonio City Council for the 9th District
- In office June 1, 1993 – May 31, 1997
- Preceded by: Thomas Labatt, III
- Succeeded by: Tim Bannwolf

Personal details
- Born: December 31, 1948 Tokyo, Japan
- Died: November 30, 2024 (aged 75) San Antonio, Texas, U.S.
- Party: Republican
- Education: University of Texas at Austin (B.A.); University of Texas at San Antonio (M.A.)
- Occupation: Politician, urban planner

Military service
- Allegiance: United States
- Branch/service: United States Army

Howard W. Peak (December 31, 1948 – November 30, 2024) was an American politician who served as the mayor of San Antonio, Texas, from 1997 to 2001. He was succeeded in office by Ed Garza. Prior to serving as mayor of the city, Peak served as a member of the San Antonio City Council from 1993 to 1997.

As of 2025, Peak was the most recent Republican to win the Mayoralty of San Antonio.

== Life and career ==
Howard Peak was born on December 31, 1948, and graduated from Alamo Heights High School in 1967. Peak earned his Bachelor of Arts in History from University of Texas at Austin in 1974. In 1975, he earned his Master of Arts degree in Urban Studies and Environmental Management from the University of Texas at San Antonio. Prior to entering San Antonio politics, Peak worked as an urban planner.

During his tenure as mayor, Peak was responsible for the development of a system of greenway trails for the city, which were named in his honor after he left office. The office of Mayor of San Antonio is a non-partisan office, as of 2018.

After leaving office, Peak spent his time on volunteer efforts in the city of San Antonio, including a project to create multi-use hiking and biking paths along the greenway trails. Peak also served as chairman of the Linear Creek Advisory Board, and received the State Trail Advocacy Award from the American Trails National Program.

The Greenway Trails System logo

Peak died in San Antonio on November 30, 2024, at the age of 75.

== Greenway ==
The Howard W. Peak Greenway Trails System is a developing network of approximately 100 miles (160 km) of paved multi-use and accessible trails in the city of San Antonio in Bexar County, Texas. The concept of building a looped-trail system within the city was originally created by Peak, and the system is named after him.

== See also ==
- Timeline of San Antonio, 1990s–2000s
