= Ben Dorcy =

American Roadie

Ben Dorcy (May 19, 1925 – September 16, 2017), also known as Lovey, was an American roadie. After working for such greats as Hank Thompson, Willie Nelson, Johnny Cash, and Kris Kristofferson, he was the first person to be inducted into the Roadies Hall of Fame in Nashville in 2009.

== Early life and education ==
Ben Dorcy was born on May 19, 1925 in Dallas, Texas.

He grew up in San Antonio, Texas and attended Jefferson High School there.

== Career ==
From 1940 until 1943 Dorcy worked for the Ice Capades, a traveling show featuring performances on ice. In 1943 he enlisted in the Navy, serving for three years, completing his service as a seaman.

From 1950 until 1953 Ben Dorcy worked for Hank Thompson, and was introduced to Willie Nelson. He also worked occasionally for Ray Price.

Traveling around the country, he was attracted by California and moved to Hollywood, Los Angeles. There, from 1960 until 1963 he was a delivery driver for Nudie Cohn. During this time he met actor John Wayne, and was employed by him as a gardener and later as his chauffeur until around 1965.

Moving to Nashville, Dorcy reunited with Thompson, Nelson, and Price, and also met and worked for Waylon Jennings, Johnny Cash, and Kris Kristofferson. Dorcy also drove for Elvis Presley.

He was nicknamed "Lovey" for his big-heartedness.

He returned to central Texas, where he immersed himself in country music, working with Merle Haggard, Jerry Jeff Walker, and David Allan Coe.

== Recognition ==
Dorcy was the first person to be inducted into the Roadies Hall of Fame in Nashville in 2009.

Two songs were written about him: "Ode to Ben Dorcy" ("Lovey's Song") by Waylon Jennings and "Big Ben Dorcy the Third" by Red Sovine.

Ben Dorcy Day is celebrated on February 22, the day Ben met Willie Nelson.

His work with Willie Nelson was highlighted in the feature documentary originally titled King of the Roadies, directed by Trevor Doyle Nelson and Amy Nelson, grand-nephew and youngest daughter of Willie. From a Kickstarter campaign to fund the movie in 2015, as of 2025 it is shown on IMDb as in post-production retitled Willie Nelson Presents: King of the Roadies.

== Death ==
Dorcy died on September 16, 2017.
