= Michael A. Nelson =

American military officer (1937–2024)

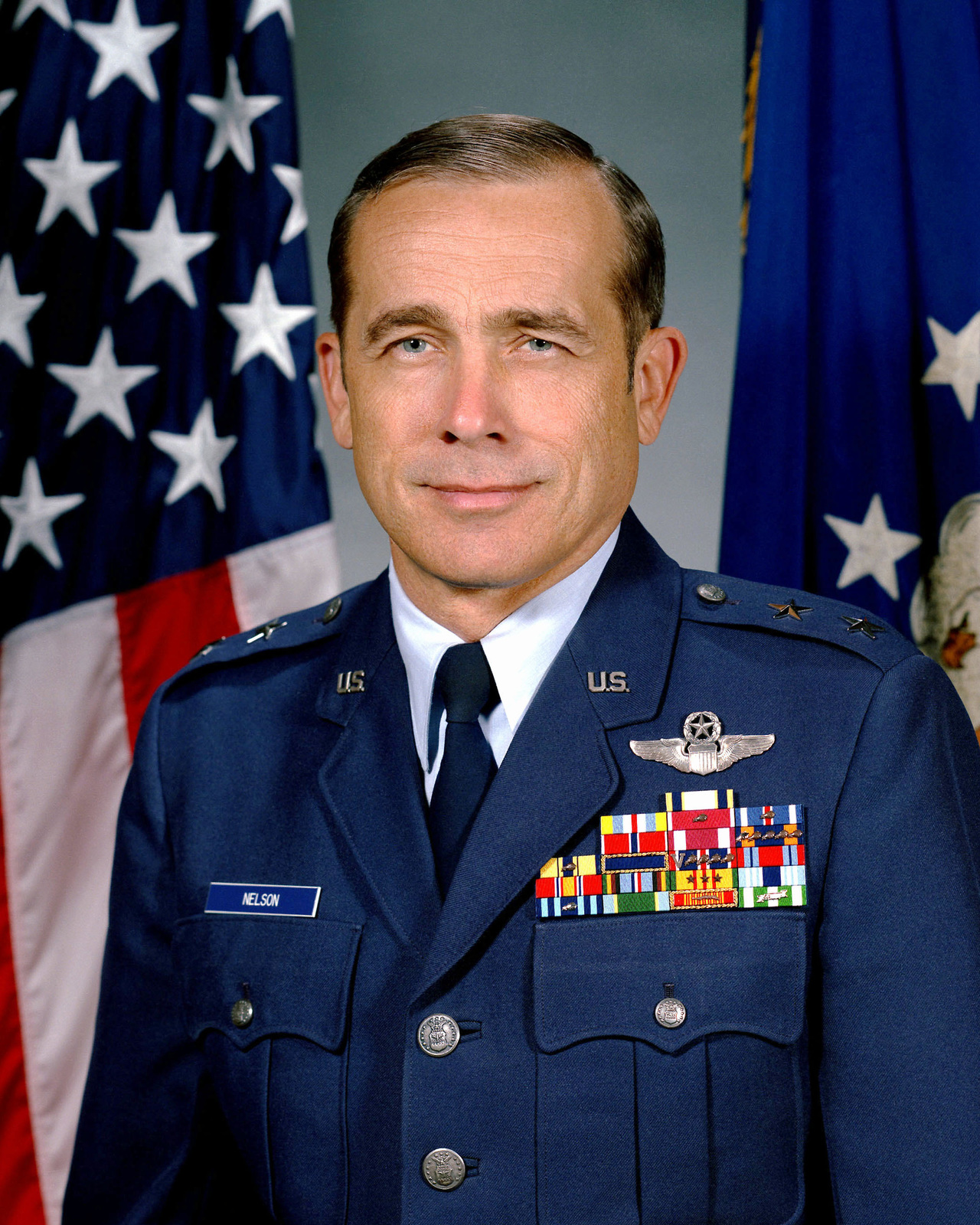
- Official portrait, 2005
- Nickname: Frisco
- Born: October 8, 1937; East Los Angeles, California, U.S.
- Died: October 8, 2024 (aged 87) Virginia, U.S.
- Branch: US Air Force
- Service years: 1959–1994
- Rank: Lieutenant General
- Awards: Defense Superior Service Medal; Legion of Merit with oak leaf cluster Distinguished Flying Cross with oak leaf cluster
- Alma mater: Stanford University; University of Arizona; National War College

Michael A. Nelson (October 8, 1937 – October 8, 2024) was a lieutenant general in the United States Air Force (USAF). He flew 100 missions over North Vietnam, collected 3500+ hours in fighter aircraft, and held command five times, including over the 9th Air Force and Operation Southern Watch. He was the 20th Deputy Chief of Staff of Plans and Operations.

After his military career, he was the president of the Air Force Historical Foundation and The Retired Officer's Association (now called the Military Officers Association of America, a change he ushered in).

== Early life and education ==
Nelson was born in East Los Angeles, California, on October 8, 1937. He moved to San Antonio, Texas, and graduated from Alamo Heights Senior High School in 1955.

- Nelson earned his bachelor's degree in international relations in 1959 from Stanford University. He was a member of the Delta Upsilon fraternity.
- He earned a master's degree in comparative politics from the University of Arizona in 1969.
- He earned another master's degree from the National War College in 1976.
- He was also educated at the Air Command and Staff College and in multiple fighter jets.

== Career ==
Nelson was commissioned through the Reserve Officer Training Corps in June 1959.

As a fighter pilot, he flew 100 combat missions in the F-105 over North Vietnam as a part of Operation Rolling Thunder. He was one of the Wild Weasels, which meant his aircraft was fitted with anti-radiation missiles and tasked with suppression of enemy air defenses. He also collected over 3500+ hours in the various aircraft he flew: the F-100, F-105, A-7, F-4, F-15, and F-16.

He held command five times at five different locations across his career and worked in the Pentagon multiple times, including as the Deputy Chief of Staff of Plans and Operations.

As part of being the commander of the 9th Air Force and CENTAF, he also oversaw Operation Southern Watch. Operation Southern Watch monitored southern Iraq.

He retired in August 1994. In retirement, he became the president of The Retired Officers Association (TROA) and served from 1995 to 2002. He worked with Congress to increase active duty pay raises, repeal dual-compensation restrictions and the REDUX retirement system, and enact TRICARE Senior Pharmacy and TRICARE For Life. As well as change the name of TROA to the Military Officers Association of America (MOAA), Nelson helped redesign The Retired Officer Magazine, launch its website, begin hosting career fairs, and formed the Member Service Center.

== Personal life and death ==
Nelson married Barbie Wigdale in 1962 and had four children with her. They remained married until her death in 2022.

Nelson died in Virginia on October 8, 2024, at the age of 87.

== Awards ==
	Defense Superior Service Medal
Width-44 crimson ribbon with a pair of width-2 white stripes on the edges	Legion of Merit with bronze oak leaf cluster
	Distinguished Flying Cross with oak leaf cluster
	Distinguished Service Medal
Width-44 scarlet ribbon with width-4 ultramarine blue stripe at center, surrounded by width-1 white stripes. Width-1 white stripes are at the edges.	Bronze Star Medal
Width-44 crimson ribbon with two width-8 white stripes at distance 4 from the edges.	Meritorious Service Medal
	Air Medal with 10 oak leaf clusters
	Air Force Commendation Medal with oak leaf cluster

== Assignments ==
Assignments Over Career
time	title	assignment	station	location
June 1959 – September 1960	pilot training student	Laredo AFB		Laredo, Texas
September 1960 – September 1961	F-100 student	Luke AFB		Maricopa County, Arizona
September 1961 – August 1965	F-100 pilot	493rd Tactical Fighter Squadron, 48th Tactical Fighter Wing	RAF Lakenheath	Lakenheath, England
August 1965 – July 1967	F-100 instructor pilot	4515th Combat Crew Training Squadron	Luke AFB	Maricopa County, Arizona
July 1967 – July 1968	member, Anti-Surface-to-Air Missile Combat Assistance Team	Tactical Air Warfare Center	Takhli Royal Thai AFB	Thailand
July 1967 – July 1968	F-105 pilot	333rd Tactical Fighter Squadron, 355th Tactical Fighter Wing	Takhli Royal Thai AFB	Thailand
July 1968 – October 1969	Master's degree student	University of Arizona		Tucson, Arizona
October 1969 – June 1971	Operations Plan Adviser	7th Air Force		Seoul, South Korea
June 1971 – May 1972	student	Air Command and Staff College	Maxwell AFB	Montgomery, Alabama
June 1972 – June 1975	A-7 instructor pilot	355th Tactical Fighter Wing	Davis-Monthan AFB	Tucson, Arizona
June 1972 – June 1975	Chief of Wing Scheduling	355th Tactical Fighter Wing	Davis-Monthan AFB	Tucson, Arizona
June 1972 – June 1975	Operations Officer	358th Tactical Fighter Squadron	Davis-Monthan AFB	Tucson, Arizona
June 1972 – June 1975	Commander	358th Tactical Fighter Squadron	Davis-Monthan AFB	Tucson, Arizona
June 1975 – August 1976	Student	National War College	Fort Lesley J. McNair	Washington, DC
August 1976 – April 1979	Chief of Europe-NATO division, Directorate of Plans	US Air Force Headquarters	Pentagon	Arlington, Virginia
August 1976 – April 1979	Air Force planner, Deputy Directorate for Joint and National Security Matters	US Air Force Headquarters	Pentagon	Arlington, Virginia
April 1979 – March 1981	Commander	21st Tactical Fighter Wing	Elmendorf AFB	Anchorage, Alaska
March 1981 – June 1983	Director of Operations	Headquarters, US Pacific Command	Camp HM Smith	Oahu, Hawaii
June 1983 – July 1984	Commander	313th Air Division	Kadena Air Base	Okinawa, Japan
July 1984 – June 1985	Commander	13th Air Force, Pacific Air Forces	Clark Air Base	Luzon, Philippines
June 1985 – June 1986	Deputy, Inspector General	US Air Force Headquarters	Pentagon	Arlington, Virginia
June 1986 – July 1987	Chief of Staff	US Air Forces in Europe	Ramstein AB	Rhineland-Palatinate, Germany
July 1987 – June 1989	Assistant, Chief of Staff for Operations	Supreme Headquarters Allied Powers Europe		Mons, Belgium
June 1989 – January 1991	Commander	Sheppard Technical Training Center	Sheppard AFB	Wichita Falls, Texas
January 1991 – June 1992	Deputy Chief of Staff, Plans and Operations	US Air Force Headquarters	Pentagon	Arlington, Virginia
June 1992 – 1994	Commander	9th Air Force	Shaw AFB	Sumter, South Carolina
June 1992 – 1994	Commander	Operation Southern Watch	Shaw AFB	Sumter, South Carolina
June 1992 – 1994	Commander	US Central Air Forces (CENTAF)	Shaw AFB	Sumter, South Carolina
