= Hondo, Texas =

- City
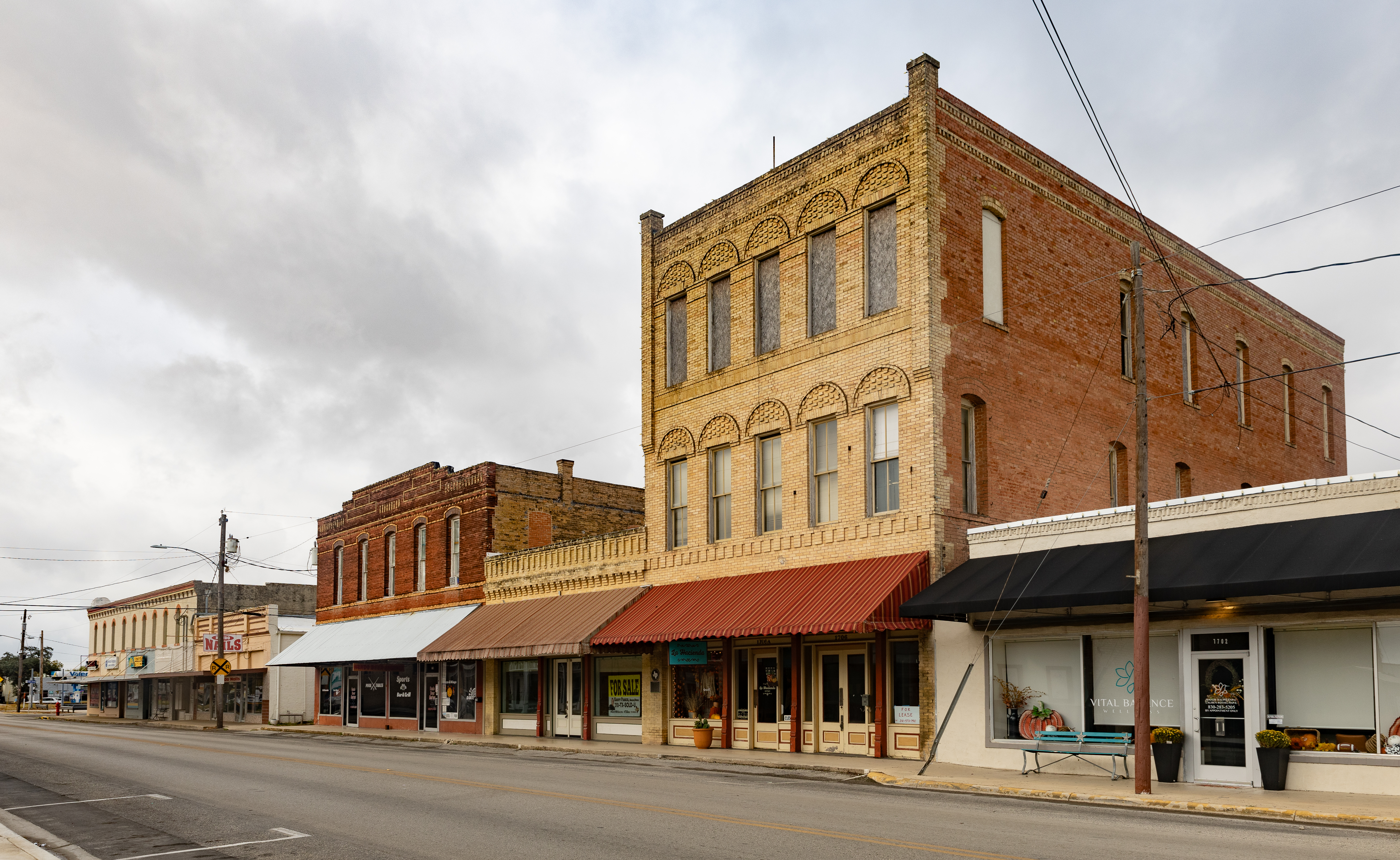
- Downtown Hondo

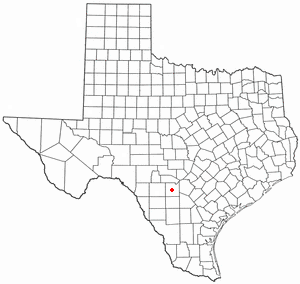
- Location of Hondo, Texas

- Coordinates: 29°21′06″N 99°08′34″W
- Country: United States
- State: Texas
- County: Medina

Government
  - Type: Council-Manager
  - City Council: Mayor James W. Danner, Sr. John McAnelly; Sammy Nooner; Eric A. Torres; Ann Michelle Long; Johnny Villa
  - City Manager: Kim Davis

Area
  - Total: 10.08 sq mi (26.10 km^{2})
  - Land: 10.05 sq mi (26.03 km^{2})
  - Water: 0.027 sq mi (0.07 km^{2})
- Elevation: 902 ft (275 m)

Population (2020)
  - Total: 8,289
  - Density: 824.8/sq mi (318.4/km^{2})
- Time zone: UTC-6 (Central (CST))
  - Summer (DST): UTC-5 (CDT)
- ZIP code: 78861
- Area code: 830
- FIPS code: 48-34676
- GNIS feature ID: 2410784
- Website: hondo-tx.org

Hondo is a city in and the county seat of Medina County, Texas, United States. According to the 2020 Census, its population was 8,289. It is part of the San Antonio metropolitan area.

== History ==
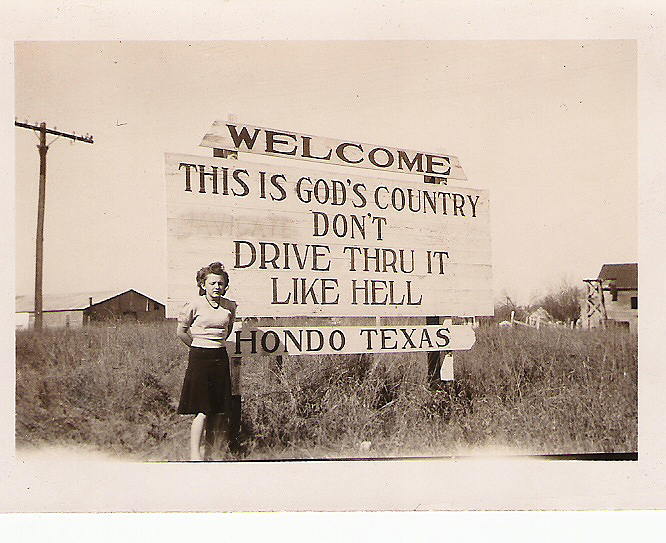
Sign in Hondo, 1941

Hondo was the scene of two bank robberies in the early 1920s. The crooks were the famed Newton Gang, the most successful outlaws in U.S. history. Both bank heists occurred the same night.

In 1930, the local Hondo Lions Club erected the now somewhat famous sign reading, "This is God's Country, Don't Drive Thru It Like Hell" at the city limits, with the intention of slowing down those speeding while traveling through town. Later, in the 1940s, the sign was changed to "This is God's Country, Please Don't Drive Through It Like Hell" to satisfy those in the town who were displeased with the tone of the old sign. The sign has been in news and print in many magazines, including on the cover of National Geographic, and in the music video of Little Texas' song "God Blessed Texas".

The U.S. Army built an airfield in the town in 1942 to train new pilots; at one time the largest air navigation school in the world, Hondo Army Air Field trained over 14,000 navigators for service during World War II before closing in 1946.

== Geography ==
Hondo is located about 40 miles (64 km) west of downtown San Antonio.

According to the United States Census Bureau, the city has a total area of 9.6 square miles (25 km^{2}), of which 0.04 square miles (0.10 km^{2}) of it (0.21%) is covered with water. Hondo was mentioned in season two, episode 13 of The Night Shift and described as "a two-stoplight town down I-90" (actually US 90).

=== Climate ===
The climate in this area is characterized by hot, humid summers and generally mild to cool winters. According to the Köppen climate classification, Hondo has a humid subtropical climate, Cfa on climate maps.

Climate data for Hondo, Texas (South Texas Regional Airport at Hondo) (1991–2020 normals, extremes 1900–present) (Note: extremes from 1900–1974 are taken from the city site)
Month	Jan	Feb	Mar	Apr	May	Jun	Jul	Aug	Sep	Oct	Nov	Dec	Year
Record high °F (°C)	90 (32)	98 (37)	102 (39)	105 (41)	106 (41)	107 (42)	112 (44)	111 (44)	112 (44)	102 (39)	99 (37)	93 (34)	112 (44)
Mean maximum °F (°C)	81.3 (27.4)	85.9 (29.9)	89.8 (32.1)	93.6 (34.2)	96.8 (36.0)	99.6 (37.6)	101.2 (38.4)	102.5 (39.2)	99.1 (37.3)	94.1 (34.5)	85.9 (29.9)	81.2 (27.3)	103.9 (39.9)
Mean daily maximum °F (°C)	65.3 (18.5)	69.7 (20.9)	75.8 (24.3)	82.7 (28.2)	88.3 (31.3)	94.4 (34.7)	96.7 (35.9)	97.2 (36.2)	91.4 (33.0)	83.8 (28.8)	73.3 (22.9)	65.6 (18.7)	82.0 (27.8)
Daily mean °F (°C)	52.0 (11.1)	56.6 (13.7)	63.0 (17.2)	69.8 (21.0)	76.9 (24.9)	82.8 (28.2)	84.7 (29.3)	84.8 (29.3)	79.6 (26.4)	71.4 (21.9)	60.6 (15.9)	52.9 (11.6)	69.6 (20.9)
Mean daily minimum °F (°C)	38.7 (3.7)	43.4 (6.3)	50.2 (10.1)	56.9 (13.8)	65.6 (18.7)	71.2 (21.8)	72.6 (22.6)	72.3 (22.4)	67.7 (19.8)	58.9 (14.9)	47.9 (8.8)	40.1 (4.5)	57.1 (13.9)
Mean minimum °F (°C)	22.5 (−5.3)	26.2 (−3.2)	30.9 (−0.6)	39.0 (3.9)	50.2 (10.1)	62.9 (17.2)	67.2 (19.6)	66.4 (19.1)	54.7 (12.6)	39.5 (4.2)	29.1 (−1.6)	23.6 (−4.7)	19.8 (−6.8)
Record low °F (°C)	4 (−16)	4 (−16)	13 (−11)	29 (−2)	38 (3)	47 (8)	57 (14)	55 (13)	43 (6)	23 (−5)	19 (−7)	7 (−14)	4 (−16)
Average precipitation inches (mm)	1.21 (31)	1.27 (32)	1.88 (48)	2.10 (53)	3.43 (87)	2.94 (75)	2.06 (52)	1.93 (49)	2.76 (70)	2.59 (66)	1.56 (40)	1.18 (30)	24.91 (633)
Average precipitation days (≥ 0.01 in)	5.9	5.7	7.0	5.6	7.7	6.0	4.9	4.5	6.8	5.5	5.9	5.9	71.4
Source: NOAA

== Demographics ==
Historical population
Census	Pop.	Note	%±
1950	4,188		—
1960	4,992		19.2%
1970	5,487		9.9%
1980	6,057		10.4%
1990	6,018		−0.6%
2000	7,897		31.2%
2010	8,803		11.5%
2020	8,289		−5.8%
U.S. Decennial Census

=== 2020 census ===
As of the 2020 census, Hondo had a population of 8,289, and 1,846 families resided in the city. The median age was 34.4 years; 20.4% of residents were under the age of 18 and 14.9% of residents were 65 years of age or older. For every 100 females there were 146.3 males, and for every 100 females age 18 and over there were 159.8 males age 18 and over.

72.4% of residents lived in urban areas, while 27.6% lived in rural areas.

There were 2,356 households in Hondo, of which 35.5% had children under the age of 18 living in them. Of all households, 41.2% were married-couple households, 18.5% were households with a male householder and no spouse or partner present, and 32.8% were households with a female householder and no spouse or partner present. About 26.3% of all households were made up of individuals and 12.6% had someone living alone who was 65 years of age or older.

There were 2,596 housing units, of which 9.2% were vacant. The homeowner vacancy rate was 1.0% and the rental vacancy rate was 6.7%.

Racial composition as of the 2020 census
Race	Number	Percent
White	4,206	50.7%
Black or African American	643	7.8%
American Indian and Alaska Native	45	0.5%
Asian	47	0.6%
Native Hawaiian and Other Pacific Islander	3	0.0%
Some other race	1,752	21.1%
Two or more races	1,593	19.2%
Hispanic or Latino (of any race)	5,131	61.9%

=== 2000 census ===
As of the census of 2000, 7,897 people, 2,207 households, and 1,664 families lived in the city. The population density was 823.8 inhabitants per square mile (318.1/km^{2}). The 2,474 housing units had an average density of 258.1 per square mile (99.7/km^{2}). The racial makeup of the city was 73.33% White, 8.33% African American, 0.47% Native American, 0.25% Asian, 15.23% from other races, and 2.38% from two or more races. Hispanics or Latinos of any race were 59.92% of the population.

Of the 2,207 households, 39.0% had children under 18 living with them, 56.1% were married couples living together, 14.0% had a female householder with no husband present, and 24.6% were not families. About 21.3% of all households were made up of individuals, and 10.7% had someone living alone who was 65 or older. The average household size was 2.91 and the average family size was 3.38.

In the city, the age distribution was 26.0% under 18, 12.0% from 18 to 24, 33.1% from 25 to 44, 16.6% from 45 to 64, and 12.3% who were 65 or older. The median age was 30 years. For every 100 females, there were 132.7 males. For every 100 females 18 and over, there were 145.5 males.

The median income for a household in the city was $27,917, and for a family was $34,856. Males had a median income of $21,639 versus $17,868 for females. The per capita income for the city was $12,635. About 18.9% of families and 22.6% of the population were below the poverty line, including 31.8% of those under 18 and 17.1% of those 65 or over.

== Government ==
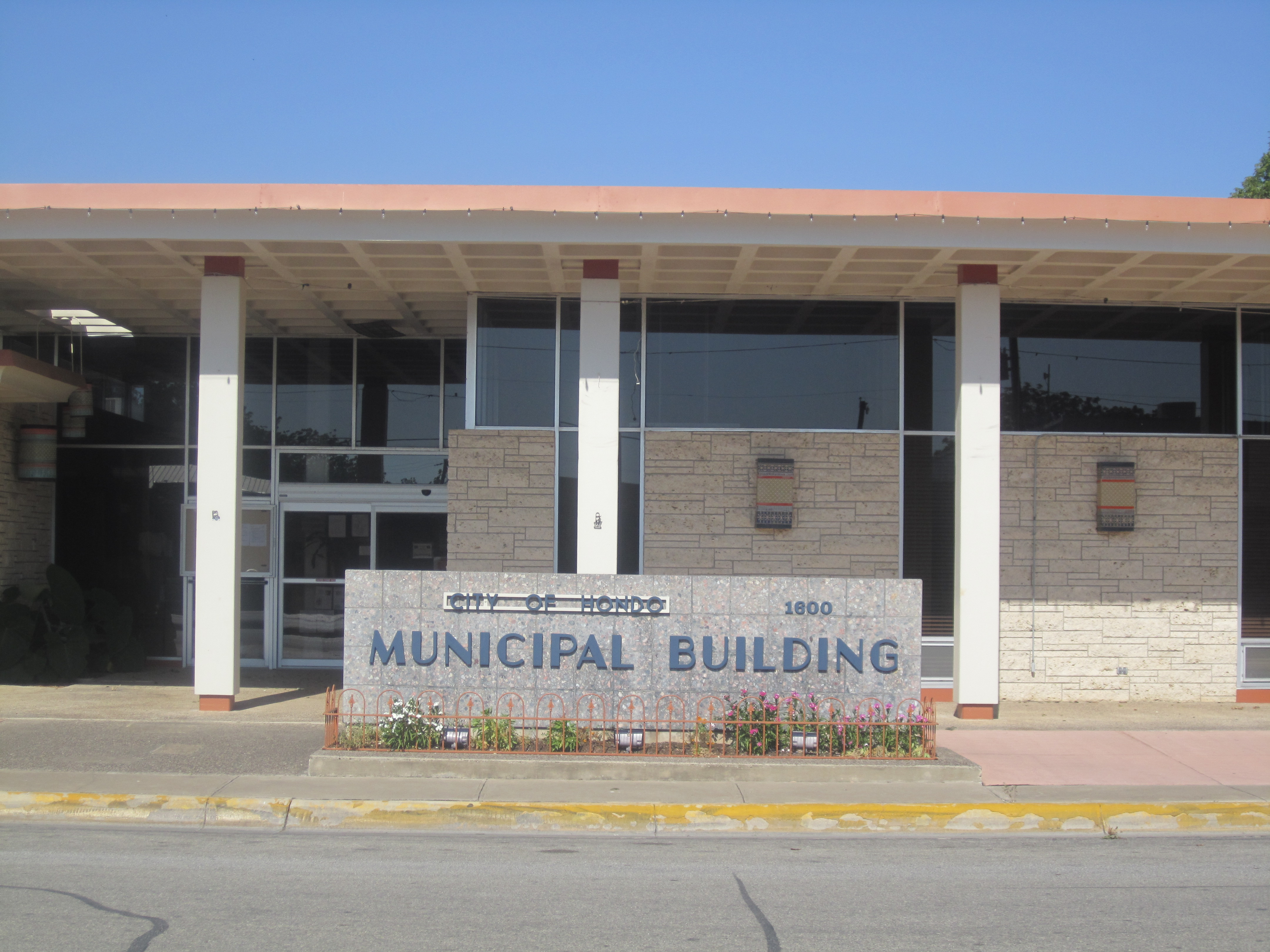
Hondo Municipal Building

Hondo is the home of the 38th Judicial District of Texas.

Hondo is governed by a six-member city council, whose members, including the mayor, are elected by the city's residents.

== Education ==
The City of Hondo is served by the Hondo Independent School District and home to the Hondo High School Owls.

== Transportation ==
U.S. Route 90 runs east-west through the center of Hondo as 19th Street, leading west 20 miles (32 km) to Sabinal and east 16 miles (26 km) to Castroville and roughly 40 miles (65 km) to downtown San Antonio. Texas State Highway 173 runs north-south immediately to the east of the city, leads north 29 miles (47 km) to Bandera and south 21 miles (34 km) to Devine, where it intersects Interstate Highway 35.

The closest airport with commercial airline service is San Antonio International Airport, on the north side of San Antonio 46 miles (74 km) to the east. Hondo also has a public airport named South Texas Regional Airport at Hondo.

== Notable people ==
- Jake Schuehle (1917-2001), American football halfback who played for the Philadelphia Eagles
- Clint Hartung, baseball pitcher/outfielder (1947–1952), was born in Hondo.
- George C. Windrow (1931–2019), member of the Wisconsin State Assembly, was born in Hondo.
