= Forrest Whitley =

American baseball player (born 1997)

Yomiuri Giants – No. 26
- Pitcher
- Born: September 15, 1997 (age 28); San Antonio, Texas, U.S.
- Bats: Right Throws: Right

Professional debut
- MLB: April 16, 2024, for the Houston Astros
- NPB: April 18, 2026, for the Yomiuri Giants

MLB statistics (through 2025 season)
- Win–loss record: 0–0
- Earned run average: 10.57
- Strikeouts: 17

NPB statistics (through August 18, 2026)
- Win-loss record: 3–4
- Earned run average: 2.31
- Strikeouts: 97
- Stats at Baseball Reference

Teams
- Houston Astros (2024–2025); Tampa Bay Rays (2025); Yomiuri Giants (2026–present)
Medals
Men's baseball
Representing United States
U-18 Baseball World Cup
Gold medal – first place	2015 Osaka	Team

Charles Forrest Whitley (born September 15, 1997) is an American professional baseball pitcher for the Yomiuri Giants of Nippon Professional Baseball (NPB). He has previously played in Major League Baseball (MLB) for the Houston Astros and Tampa Bay Rays.

== Early life and amateur career ==
Whitley attended Alamo Heights High School in San Antonio, Texas. In the summer prior to his senior year he was a member of the 18-and-under national team that won the World Cup. Whitley threw a no-hitter with 14 strikeouts in a game during his senior year.

== Professional career ==
=== Houston Astros ===
==== Draft and minor leagues ====
The Houston Astros selected Whitley in the first round, with the 17th overall selection, in the 2016 Major League Baseball draft. He had committed to Florida State University to play college baseball, but instead decided to sign with the Astros. He was assigned on July 13, 2016, to the Gulf Coast Astros of the Rookie-level Gulf Coast League, and was later promoted to the Greeneville Astros of the Rookie-level Appalachian League. In 18 2/3 innings pitched between both teams, he posted a 1-2 record and a 4.82 earned run average (ERA).

Whitley began the 2017 season with the Quad Cities River Bandits of the Single-A Midwest League and received promotions to the Buies Creek Astros of the High-A Carolina League in July, and to the Corpus Christi Hooks of the Double-A Texas League in August. In 23 total games (18 starts) between the three teams, he pitched to a combined 5–4 record and 2.83 ERA with 143 strikeouts in 92 1/3 innings pitched.

On February 21, 2018, Whitley was suspended 50 games for violating MLB's drug prevention and treatment program. He recorded a 3.76 ERA in 8 starts for Corpus Christi that season. The Astros invited Whitley to spring training in 2019, and he began the season with the Round Rock Express of the Triple-A Pacific Coast League. He was selected to play in the Arizona Fall League for the Peoria Javelinas following the season.

The Astros added Whitley to their 40-man roster after the 2020 season. On March 10, 2021, it was announced that Whitley would undergo ulnar collateral ligament reconstruction, more commonly known as Tommy John surgery, and miss the 2021 season as a result.

Whitley began a rehabilitation assignment on June 16, 2022 with the Florida Complex League (FCL) Astros. He delivered 38 pitches across two innings, allowed three runs and averaged 96 miles per hour (154 km/h) on his fastball versus the FCL Nationals. It was his first competition in professional baseball since September 2, 2019. He ended the season appearing in a total of 13 games split between the FCL Astros, Single-A Fayetteville Woodpeckers, and Triple-A Sugar Land Space Cowboys, posting a cumulative 0-2 record and 6.53 ERA with 45 strikeouts in 40.0 innings pitched.

The Astros optioned Whitley to Triple-A Sugar Land to begin the 2023 season. In 8 appearances (6 starts), he registered a 1–2 record and 5.70 ERA with 32 strikeouts in 30.0 innings pitched. On June 2, Whitley was ruled out for 3–4 months after being diagnosed with a lat strain. After spending much of spring training battling finger inflammation, the Astros again optioned Whitley to Sugar Land to begin the 2024 season.

==== Major leagues ====
On April 16, 2024, the Astros promoted Whitley to the major leagues for the first time. He played in three games and pitched 3 1/3 innings without allowing a run, with five strikeouts and three walks before getting demoted on September 5.

Whitley began the 2025 season on the injured list due to a bone bruise. He was activated him from the injured list on April 19. Out of options, Whitley had to stay in the major leagues with the Astros. A left knee sprain resulted in another IL stint. He pitched 7 1/3 innings and surrendered six walks and two home runs for a 12.27 ERA. On June 8, 2025, Whitley was designated for assignment to make room for Brandon Walter on the active roster.

=== Tampa Bay Rays ===
On June 13, 2025, Whitley was traded to the Tampa Bay Rays in exchange for cash considerations. In five appearances for the Rays, he struggled to a 15.43 ERA with four strikeouts over 4 2/3 innings pitched. Whitley was designated for assignment by Tampa Bay on June 28. He cleared waivers and was sent outright to the Triple-A Durham Bulls on July 3. On November 6, the Rays added Whitley back to their roster to prevent him from reaching minor league free agency. He was released by the Rays on November 18, in order to pursue an opportunity in Japan.

=== Yomiuri Giants ===
On November 19, 2025, Whitley signed with the Yomiuri Giants of Nippon Professional Baseball.

== See also ==
- List of people from San Antonio
