= Olmos Park, Texas =

- City
- Location of Olmos Park, Texas
- Coordinates: 29°28′30″N 98°29′17″W
- Country: United States
- State: Texas
- County: Bexar
- Incorporated: May 1939

Government
  - Mayor: Erin Harrison
  - City Council: Will Brooks; Juliana Dusek; Chris Pal-Freeman; Kenyon McDonald; Sharon Plant

Area
  - Total: 0.61 sq mi (1.59 km^{2})
  - Land: 0.61 sq mi (1.59 km^{2})
  - Water: 0 sq mi (0.00 km^{2})
- Elevation: 807 ft (246 m)

Population (2020)
  - Total: 2,180
  - Density: 3,550/sq mi (1,370/km^{2})
- Time zone: UTC-6 (Central (CST))
  - Summer (DST): UTC-5 (CDT)
- ZIP code: 78212
- Area codes: 210, 726
- FIPS code: 48-53988
- GNIS feature ID: 1343270
- ANSI Code: 2411315
- Website: Official website

Olmos Park is a city in Bexar County, Texas, United States. The population was 2,180 at the 2020 census. The town is noted for its park-like setting, oak-tree lined streets, and large estates, many of which were constructed during the 1920s. The town is 4 miles (6.4 km) north of Downtown San Antonio and is surrounded by the city of San Antonio on the west, north, and south side.

== History ==
Olmos Park was developed in the 1920s as an exclusive suburb of San Antonio, which today completely surrounds it. H.C. Thorman, a renowned oilman and real estate tycoon, purchased property from an Austrian count and developed it into the posh Olmos Park. The city occupied the site where Camp John Wise was built in 1917. Camp John Wise was a US Army balloonist training site. The camp shut down in 1919 when the balloonist training was moved to nearby Brooks Field.

Sometimes confused with the City of Olmos Park, Olmos Park Terrace, was developed by the same developer a few years later in the 1930s as part of his larger Olmos District development and borders Olmos Park's western edge. Olmos Park Terrace was designated a San Antonio Historic District on Oct. 4, 2007 by Ord. 2007-10-04-1070.

== Geography ==
Olmos Park is located 4 miles north of Downtown San Antonio.

According to the United States Census Bureau, the city has a total area of 0.6-square-mile (1.6 km^{2}), all land. It is an enclave of San Antonio, as it is completely bounded by the city. Olmos Park can be found in ZIP Code 78212.

U.S. Route 281 is a north-south highway that serves as the boundary for one side of the community, the other side being bounded by McCullough Road, a major San Antonio surface street.

== Demographics ==
Historical population
Census	Pop.	Note	%±
1940	1,822		—
1950	2,841		55.9%
1960	2,457		−13.5%
1970	2,250		−8.4%
1980	2,069		−8.0%
1990	2,161		4.4%
2000	2,343		8.4%
2010	2,237		−4.5%
2020	2,180		−2.5%
U.S. Decennial Census

=== 2020 census ===
As of the 2020 census, Olmos Park had a population of 2,180. The median age was 46.7 years. 22.5% of residents were under the age of 18 and 21.5% of residents were 65 years of age or older. For every 100 females there were 97.5 males, and for every 100 females age 18 and over there were 92.5 males age 18 and over.

100.0% of residents lived in urban areas, while 0.0% lived in rural areas.

There were 924 households in Olmos Park, of which 30.1% had children under the age of 18 living in them. Of all households, 56.5% were married-couple households, 15.5% were households with a male householder and no spouse or partner present, and 25.3% were households with a female householder and no spouse or partner present. About 30.0% of all households were made up of individuals and 14.9% had someone living alone who was 65 years of age or older.

There were 1,037 housing units, of which 10.9% were vacant. The homeowner vacancy rate was 1.4% and the rental vacancy rate was 15.3%.

Racial composition as of the 2020 census
Race	Number	Percent
White	1,712	78.5%
Black or African American	29	1.3%
American Indian and Alaska Native	10	0.5%
Asian	28	1.3%
Native Hawaiian and Other Pacific Islander	1	0.0%
Some other race	61	2.8%
Two or more races	339	15.6%
Hispanic or Latino (of any race)	473	21.7%

=== 2000 census ===
As of the 2000 census of 2000, there were 2,343 people, 1,043 households, and 616 families residing in the city. The population density was 3,860.1 inhabitants per square mile (1,490.4/km^{2}). There were 1,131 housing units at an average density of 1,863.3 per square mile (719.4/km^{2}). The racial makeup of the city was 93.60% White, 2.09% African American, 0.47% Native American, 0.68% Asian, 0.09% Pacific Islander, 2.30% from other races, and 0.77% from two or more races. Hispanic or Latino of any race were 14.60% of the population.

There were 1,043 households, out of which 28.5% had children under the age of 18 living with them, 51.0% were married couples living together, 7.0% had a female householder with no husband present, and 40.9% were non-families. 36.1% of all households were made up of individuals, and 8.2% had someone living alone who was 65 years of age or older. The average household size was 2.24 and the average family size was 2.96.

In the city, the population was spread out, with 23.6% under the age of 18, 5.1% from 18 to 24, 28.1% from 25 to 44, 29.2% from 45 to 64, and 14.1% who were 65 years of age or older. The median age was 41 years. For every 100 females, there were 88.6 males. For every 100 females age 18 and over, there were 84.5 males.

The median income for a household in the city was $87,560, and the median income for a family was $128,814. Males had a median income of $81,296 versus $35,500 for females. The per capita income for the city was $65,697. About 1.9% of families and 3.9% of the population were below the poverty line, including 3.0% of those under age 18 and 2.1% of those age 65 or over. The median home price for 2019 was $756,000.

== Government ==
Olmos Park adheres to the council-manager form of government. The mayor is Erin Harrison.

== Politics ==
In the 2016 presidential election, Olmos Park went to Republican nominee Donald Trump with 669 votes (51%) while Democratic nominee Hillary Clinton received 561 votes (43%). In the 2020 presidential election, Olmos Park tallied 726 votes (48%) for Republican nominee Trump and 769 votes (51%) for Democratic nominee Joe Biden. In the 2024 presidential election, Republican nominee Trump garnered 702 votes (49%) in Olmos Park to Democratic nominee Kamala Harris's 695 votes (49%).

== Education ==
Olmos Park is zoned to the Alamo Heights Independent School District. Alamo Heights High School is the district's comprehensive high school.

== Notable person ==
- Randall L. Stephenson, businessman.
