= Alamo Heights High School =

Location
- 6900 Broadway Street; San Antonio, Bexar County, Texas 78209; United States; 29.491199°N 98.464793°W

Information
- School type: Public, high school
- Established: Original schoolhouse: 1909; Original High School building: 1923; Previous High School building: 1950; Current High School building: 2026
- Locale: Suburb: Large
- School district: Alamo Heights ISD
- Superintendent: Dana Bashara
- NCES School ID: 480759000045
- Principal: Cory Smith
- Teaching staff: 113.34 (on an FTE basis)
- Grades: 9–12
- Enrollment: 1,569 (2024–2025)
- Student to teacher ratio: 13.84
- Campus type: Suburban
- Colors: Blue and gold
- Athletics conference: UIL Class AAAAA
- Mascot: Mules
- Newspaper: Hoof Print
- Yearbook: Olmos
- Website: Alamo Heights High School

Alamo Heights High School is a public high school located in the city of Alamo Heights, Texas and classified as a 5A school by the University Interscholastic League. Alamo Heights is the only high school in the Alamo Heights Independent School District. During 2024–2025, Alamo Heights High School had an enrollment of 1,569 students and a student to teacher ratio of 13.84. The school received an overall rating of "B" from the Texas Education Agency for the 2024–2025 school year.

== Athletics ==
The Alamo Heights Mules compete in cheerleading, volleyball, cross country running, football, basketball, swimming, diving, soccer, golf, tennis, track, baseball, and softball.

=== State titles ===
- Boys basketball -
  - 1952(3A), 1954(3A)
- Football -
  - 2006(4A/D1)
- Boys golf -
  - 1950(City), 1956(2A), 1963(4A), 1964(4A), 1965(4A), 1968(4A), 1970(4A)
- Boys soccer -
  - 1987(All), 2012(4A)
- Girls golf -
  - 2023(5A), 2024(5A), 2025(5A)
- Girls swimming -
  - 1973(3A), 2014(4A)
- Team tennis -
  - 1984(4A), 1986(4A), 1987(4A), 1988(4A), 1993(4A), 1994(4A), 1995(4A), 1996(4A), 1998(4A), 1999(4A), 2000(4A), 2002(4A)
- Cheerleading -
  - 2016(5A), 2017(5A), 2019(5A), 2020(5A)

== Hazing incident ==
In 2022, school officials investigated a hazing incident. During this incident, the more established members of the varsity football team forced the incoming varsity sophomores and juniors to participate in dangerous initiation-related activities. One of these activities included players being required to insert hot sauce-covered Oreos into their anal cavities, while running around a baseball diamond and being shot with paintballs. If the Oreo fell out, they would be forced to pick it up and consume the entire thing. One of the victims of the incident was later hospitalized due to an allergic reaction. The principal as well as the football coaches responded to the press stating that they had no knowledge of the event and did not condone the behavior of their students. The Alamo Heights Police department referred to the event as “the Mules’ night of nudity, lap dances, Oreos, and hot sauce.” As a punishment, almost all of the senior members of the football team were suspended for two consecutive games and required to participate in ten hours of community service. Many of the juniors who were involved in the incident were also punished, but not as severely as the seniors who orchestrated the event.

== Notable alumni ==
=== Actors/producers ===
- Dayna Devon, class of 1988, is a former TV host of the syndicated show- EXTRA.
- Brenda Marshall, actress
- Ross Richie, class of 1988, comic book publisher and founder of Boom! Studios.
- Peter Weller, class of 1965, is an actor in movies such as RoboCop.

=== Architects ===
- Robert Hammond, class of 1988, co-founder and the executive director of Friends of the High Line.

=== Authors/journalists ===
- Marie Brenner, class of 1967, is an author, investigative journalist, and writer-at-large for Vanity Fair magazine.
- Rick Riordan, class of 1982, is a San Antonio-based novelist of the Tres Navarre mystery series for adults and The New York Times bestselling Percy Jackson series for children.

=== Baseball ===
- Billy Grabarkewitz, class of 1964, former MLB player
- Davey Johnson, class of 1961, former manager of MLB's Washington Nationals and 3 time World Series winner as coach & player
- Forrest Whitley, 1st Round Draft Pick in 2016 by the Houston Astros

=== Basketball ===
- Ben Lammers, professional basketball player

=== Biochemist/biologist ===
- Angela Belcher, attended, is the Director of the Biomolecular Materials Group at MIT.
- William H. Cade, class of 1964, Animal Behaviorist, Othroperist, President Emeritus of the University of Lethbridge.

=== Educator ===
- Light Townsend Cummins, class of 1964, is the official State Historian of Texas.

=== Fashion designer ===
- Marisol Deluna, class of 1985, is an American fashion designer.

=== Football ===
- Patrick Bailey, class of 2004, former linebacker for the Tennessee Titans and won a Super Bowl with the Pittsburgh Steelers in 2009.
- Chase Clement, class of 2004, was a quarterback for the Las Vegas Locomotives and won the UFL's 2010 Championship Game taking home the game MVP trophy.

=== Inventors ===
- "Tito” Beveridge, class of 1979, founder of Tito’s Vodka
- Bette Nesmith Graham, inventor and founder of Liquid Paper

=== Military ===
- Kara Hultgreen, class of 1983, (D. 1994), first female carrier-based Navy fighter pilot.
- Michael A. Nelson, class of 1955, (1937–2024), Lieutenant General in the United States Air Force.

=== Musician ===
- Arthur Barrow, musician, composer, producer, and arranger. Played with Frank Zappa, Robby Krieger, The Doors among others. Worked with Giorgio Moroder on Top Gun and other soundtracks.
- Christopher Cross, class of 1969, is a recording artist with Top 40 hits including "Sailing" and "Arthur's Theme".
- Clay Tarver, class of 1984, co-founder of the bands Chavez (band) and Bullet LaVolta, screenwriter for the movie Joy Ride and Writers Guild of America award-winning Executive Producer of the HBO show Silicon Valley

=== Politician ===
- Howard Peak, class of 1967, mayor of San Antonio 1997–2001
- Joe Straus, class of 1978, is a former Speaker of the Texas House of Representatives.
- Susan Weddington, class of 1969, state chairman of the Republican Party of Texas from 1997 to 2003
- Jeff Wentworth, class of 1958, served in the Texas Senate from 1993 to 2013 after tenure in the Texas House of Representatives from 1988 to 1993.
- Paul W. Green, class of 1970, served on the Texas Fourth Court of Appeals from 1995 to 2004 and the Supreme Court of Texas from 2005 to 2020.

== See also ==
- San Antonio Independent School District v. Rodriguez
