= Patrick Bailey (American football) =

American football player (born 1985)

No. 46, 55, 57
- Position: Linebacker

Personal information
- Born: November 19, 1985 (age 40); Elmendorf, Texas, U.S.
- Listed height: 6 ft 4 in (1.93 m)
- Listed weight: 243 lb (110 kg)

Career information
- High school: Alamo Heights (San Antonio, Texas)
- College: Duke
- NFL draft: 2008: undrafted

Career history
- Pittsburgh Steelers (2008–2009); Tennessee Titans (2010–2013)

Awards and highlights
- Super Bowl champion (XLIII)

Career NFL statistics
- Total tackles: 71
- Stats at Pro Football Reference

Patrick Bailey (born November 19, 1985) is an American former professional football player who was a linebacker in the National Football League (NFL). He played college football for the Duke Blue Devils and was signed as an undrafted free agent in 2008 by the Pittsburgh Steelers. Bailey won Super Bowl XLIII with the Steelers. He also played for the Tennessee Titans.

== Early life ==
He graduated in 2004 from Alamo Heights High School in San Antonio. He played college football for the Duke Blue Devils.

== Professional career ==
=== Pittsburgh Steelers ===
After spending the first two games of the 2008 season on the Steelers' practice squad, Bailey was signed to the active roster on September 20. Bailey made a solo special teams tackle against the Philadelphia Eagles in his first NFL game, and followed that up with two solo tackles on special teams against the Baltimore Ravens. He injured his hamstring playing against the Ravens.

Bailey was waived on October 4 when the team signed practice squad defensive tackle Scott Paxson to the active roster. He was re-signed to the practice squad the following day, rejoining the active roster soon after. Bailey earned the Steelers rookie of the year award for his play on special teams.

He played special teams and registered a tackle in the Steelers victory over the Arizona Cardinals in Super Bowl XLIII on February 1, 2009.

He was cut on September 4, 2010.

=== Tennessee Titans ===
On September 5, 2010, Bailey was claimed off waivers by the Tennessee Titans. On September 1, 2014, Bailey was waived by the Titans.

== Personal life ==
Bailey and his wife Maggie live in Nashville, Tennessee, and Elmendorf, Texas. As of 2017 he worked for Asurion in a strategic pricing role.
