= Dayna Devon =

American TV personality (born 1970)

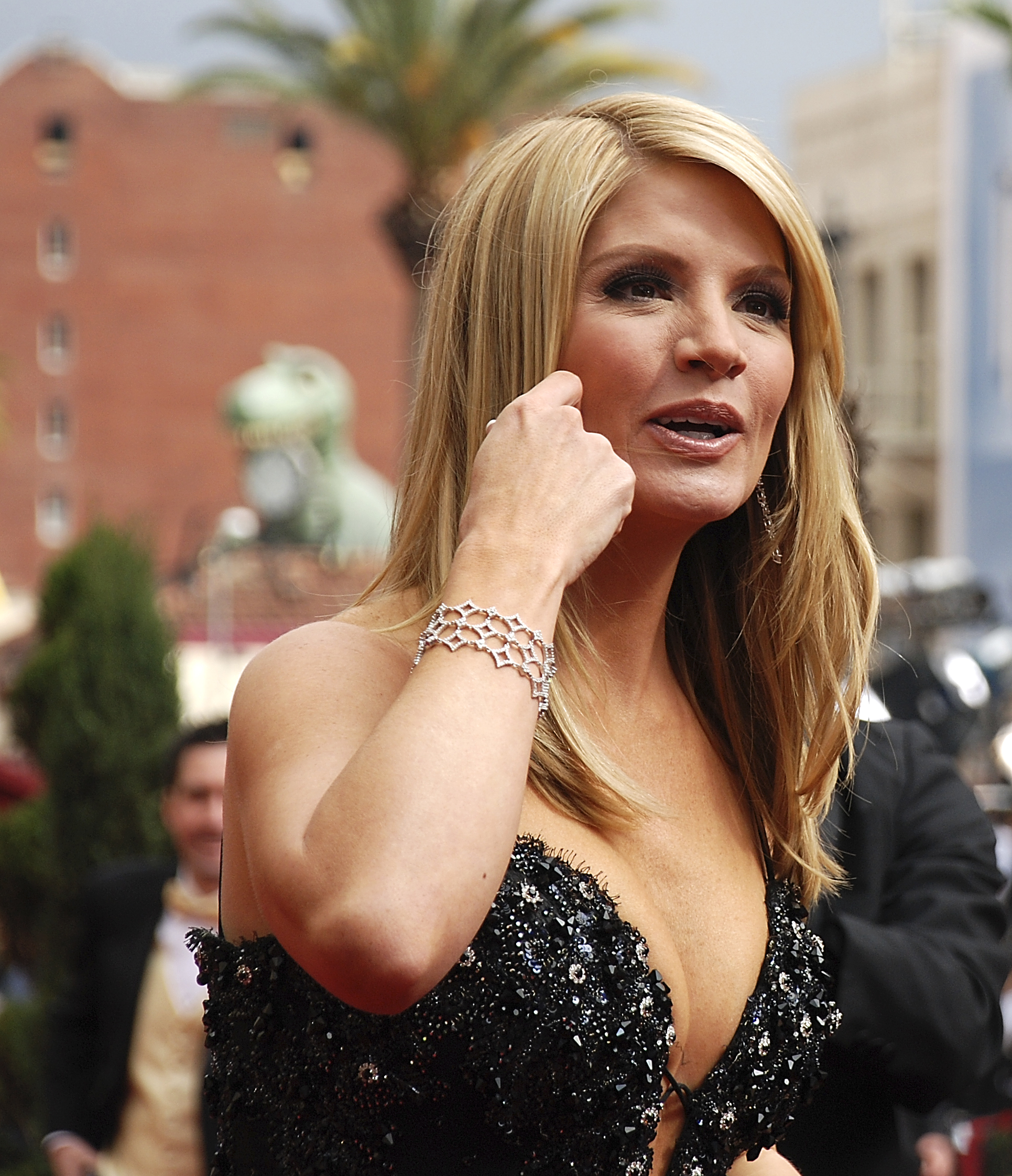
- Devon at the 2007 Academy Awards
- Born: March 20, 1970 (age 55); San Antonio, Texas
- Education: University of Texas at San Antonio
- Occupations: TV personality and journalist

Dayna Devon (born March 20, 1970) is an American journalist.

== Biography ==
Devon is a native of San Antonio, Texas, and a graduate of the University of Texas at San Antonio. She began her broadcast journalism career as the weekend anchor at KTSA-AM radio in San Antonio. She subsequently was an anchor for KMID-TV (ABC) in Midland, Texas, and KLST (CBS) in San Angelo, Texas. In 1997, Devon joined the ABC's Memphis, Tennessee affiliate WPTY-TV as a reporter. The following year, she was promoted to anchor of the station's three news broadcasts. In 1998, Devon and her news team were awarded a "Best Live Broadcast" Emmy Award.

In 2004, she appeared in the Star Trek: Enterprise episode “The Augments” as the N.D. Engineer. She was the co-anchor, with Mark McGrath, of the television show Extra, until 2008. She joined Extra in 1999 as the weekend anchor, then became the weekday anchor in 2003. In January 2009, Devon became an on-air presenter on HSN, representing the Sensa Weight-Loss System. In the fall of 2009, Devon moved to ShopNBC, regularly presenting Sensa systems in "Our Top Value" presentations. As of January 2013, Devon is a cast member of the new TLC reality show Plastic Wives. She currently is a reporter for KTLA in Los Angeles. As such, she hosts the station's 7:30 PM local content segment with a lifestyle program called "LA Unscripted."
