= Children in immigration detention in the United States =

Detention of minors by U.S. immigration authorities

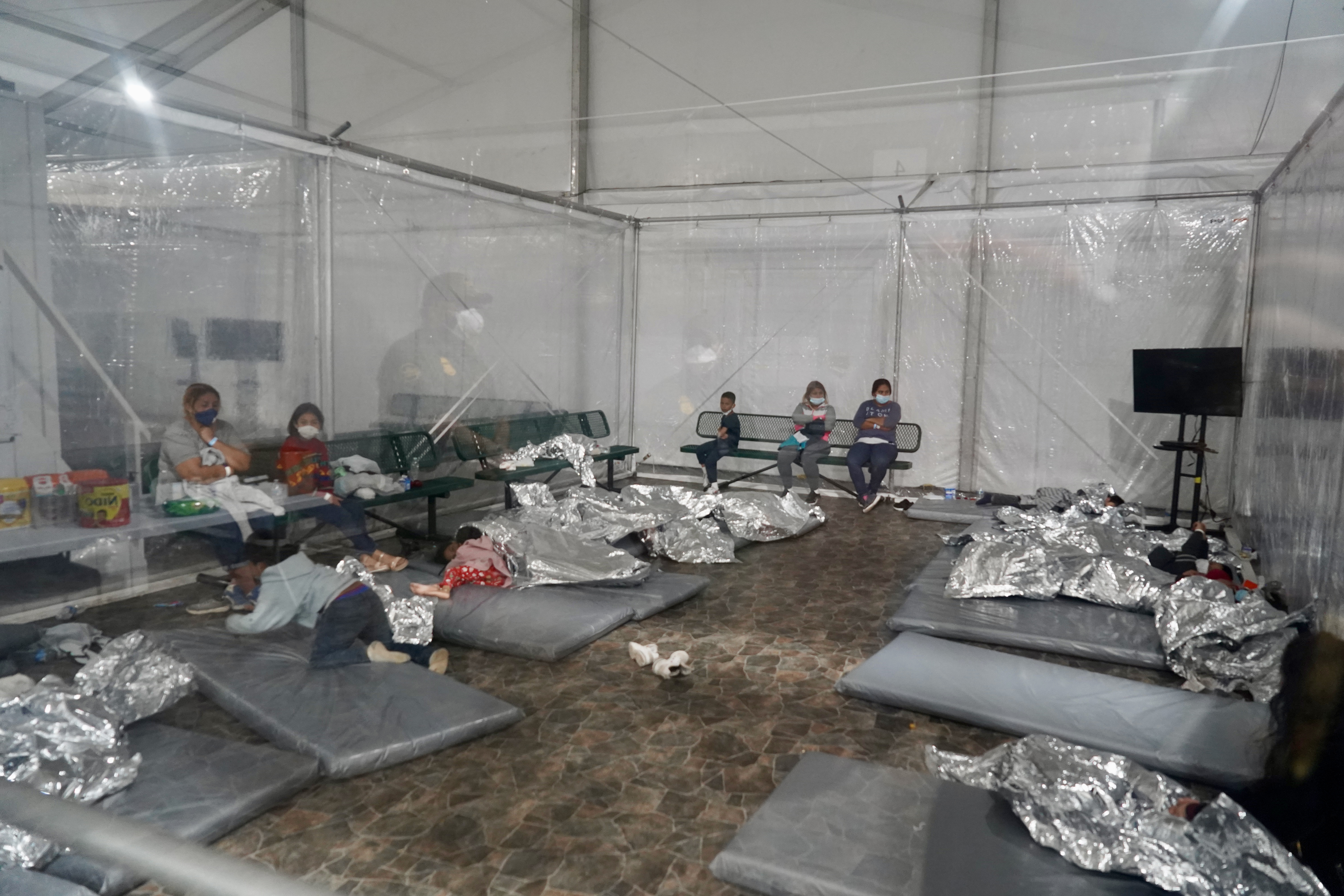
Temporary soft sided facilities are utilized to process families and children,

Children in immigration detention in the United States refers to the government practice of holding minors in federal custody during immigration proceedings. This includes both unaccompanied minors who arrive without a parent or guardian and children detained alongside family members. The practice has been governed since 1997 by the Flores Settlement Agreement, which requires that children be held in the least restrictive setting appropriate and released without unnecessary delay. The detention of immigrant children has been a recurring source of legal and political conflict, particularly during the 2018 family separation policy, which forcibly separated more than 5,500 children from their parents at the U.S.–Mexico border.

== Background ==
=== Origins and the Flores litigation ===
During the 1980s, the Immigration and Naturalization Service (INS) had no specific standards for the detention of immigrant children. Minors were routinely strip-searched, held alongside unrelated adults, and denied access to education or recreation. INS policy permitted release only to a parent or legal guardian, excluding other relatives.

On July 11, 1985, attorneys from the Center for Human Rights and Constitutional Law filed a class action lawsuit, Jenny Lisette Flores v. Edwin Meese, in the United States District Court for the Central District of California. The lead plaintiff, Jenny Lisette Flores, was a 15-year-old Salvadoran girl who had been handcuffed, strip-searched, and placed in a juvenile detention center where she shared quarters with unrelated adults. The suit challenged the constitutionality of INS detention and release policies for unaccompanied minors.

The case reached the Supreme Court in 1993 as Reno v. Flores (507 U.S. 292), where a 7–2 majority held that the INS regulation did not facially violate the Due Process Clause. Justice Scalia wrote the majority opinion; Justices Stevens and Blackmun dissented. Justice O'Connor's concurrence acknowledged that detained children possessed "a constitutionally protected interest in freedom from institutional confinement." Despite winning on the constitutional question, the government continued negotiating, and on January 28, 1997, both sides signed the Flores Settlement Agreement.

=== Key provisions of the Flores Settlement ===
The Flores Settlement Agreement (FSA) established a nationwide policy for the detention, release, and treatment of minors in INS custody. Its main requirements include:

- Treatment of all minors "with dignity, respect and special concern for their particular vulnerability"
- Placement in the "least restrictive setting appropriate" to the child's age and needs
- Release "without unnecessary delay," following a preference order: parent, legal guardian, adult relative, adult designated by the parent, or a licensed program
- Transfer to non-secure, licensed facilities within 3 to 5 days of apprehension, extendable to 20 days during an influx
- Access to healthcare, education, recreation, and legal assistance

The agreement was intended to be temporary but has remained in force after federal courts blocked repeated government attempts to terminate it. In July 2015, U.S. District Judge Dolly M. Gee ruled that the FSA applies to both accompanied and unaccompanied children, and that the Obama administration's family detention expansion was a "material breach." The Ninth Circuit affirmed in July 2016.

=== Federal statutory framework ===
The Homeland Security Act of 2002 (P.L. 107-296) abolished the INS and transferred responsibility for unaccompanied children from the INS Commissioner to the Office of Refugee Resettlement (ORR) within the Department of Health and Human Services, effective March 1, 2003. The statute defines an "unaccompanied alien child" as a child under 18 with no lawful immigration status and no parent or legal guardian in the United States available to provide care.

The William Wilberforce Trafficking Victims Protection Reauthorization Act of 2008 (P.L. 110-457) added further protections, including a 72-hour transfer requirement from apprehending agencies to ORR, a best interest standard for custody decisions, access to counsel "to the greatest extent practicable," and the right for unaccompanied children to apply for asylum before USCIS rather than solely in removal proceedings.

== Government agencies and custody process ==
Three federal agencies handle the detention of immigrant children.

U.S. Customs and Border Protection (CBP) is typically the first point of contact, apprehending children at the border or ports of entry. CBP facilities are law enforcement installations not designed for children; agency standards state detainees should generally not be held longer than 72 hours.

For unaccompanied children, the process moves from CBP apprehension to notification of ORR within 48 hours, followed by transfer to ORR custody within 72 hours. ORR places children in a network of care provider facilities and works to identify a sponsor (usually a parent or relative) for release. Facility types range from shelters and foster care to staff-secure and secure placements, plus influx care facilities opened during surges. As of FY2024, ORR operated 240 facilities across 27 states and had provided care for over 800,000 unaccompanied children since 2003.

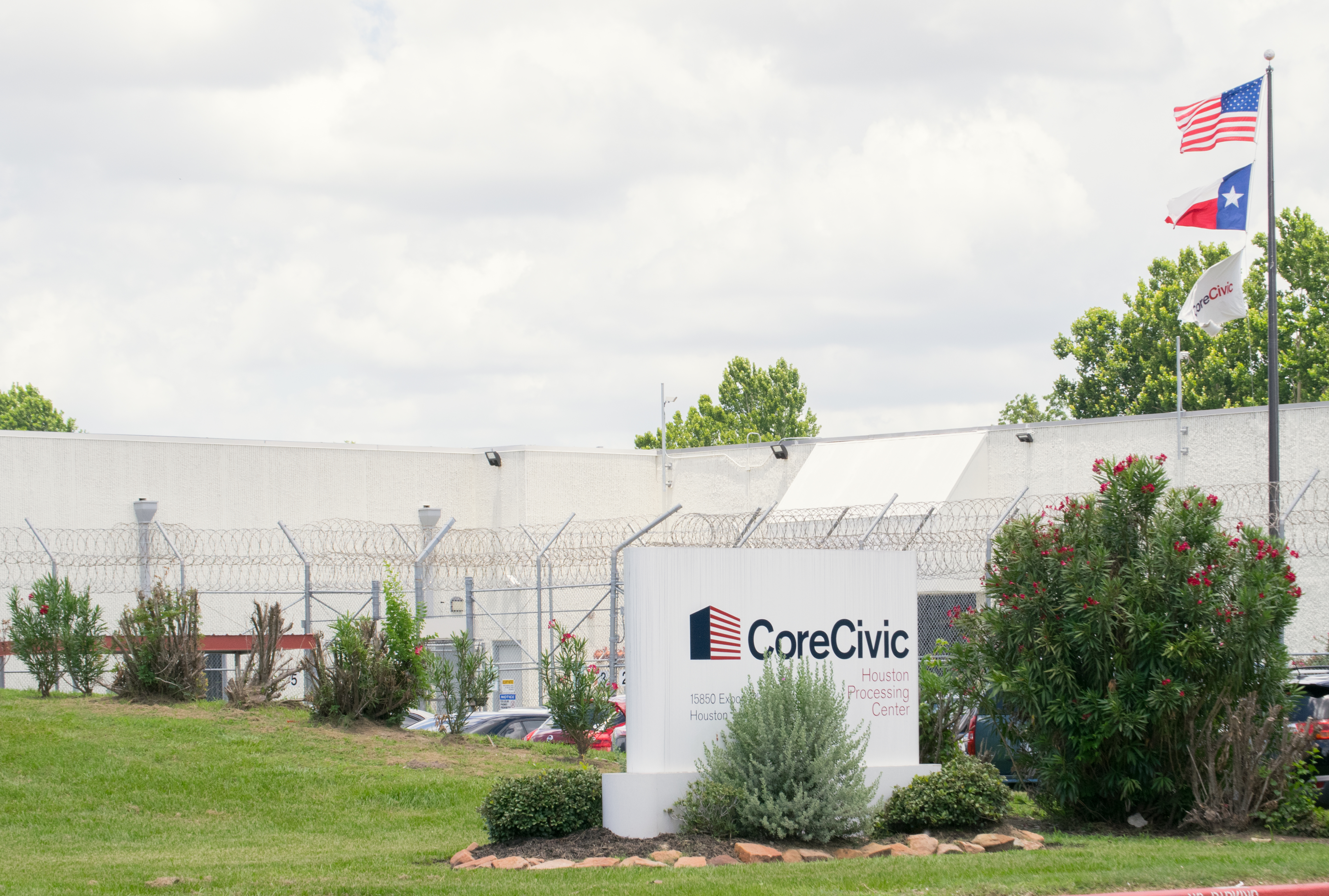
CoreCivic is a private company currently profiting of the incarceration of immigrants, including children.

U.S. Immigration and Customs Enforcement (ICE) oversees detention of family units. ICE has operated family residential centers including the Berks County Residential Center in Pennsylvania, the Karnes County Residential Center in Texas (operated by GEO Group), and the South Texas Family Residential Center in Dilley, Texas (operated by CoreCivic), the largest such facility with 2,400 beds. Children traveling with a parent or legal guardian are processed as family units; those traveling with grandparents, aunts, uncles, or adult siblings are classified as unaccompanied.

== Policy developments ==
=== Obama administration ===
Between FY2013 and FY2014, unaccompanied children apprehended at the border surged from 38,759 to 68,541, driven largely by gang violence in Guatemala, Honduras, and El Salvador. On May 12, 2014, DHS Secretary Jeh Johnson declared a Level IV condition of readiness.

The administration, which had ended family detention at the T. Don Hutto Residential Center in 2009, reversed course and expanded family detention capacity from roughly 90 to over 3,700 beds within a year. Three new facilities opened in 2014: the Artesia Family Residential Center in New Mexico (closed by late 2014 amid criticism), the Karnes County facility, and the Dilley facility. A coalition of 168 NGOs signed a letter opposing the expansion. Judge Gee's 2015 ruling forced a shift to shorter-term detention, generally under 20 days, followed by release with ankle monitors.

=== Trump administration first term ===
==== Zero tolerance policy and family separations ====
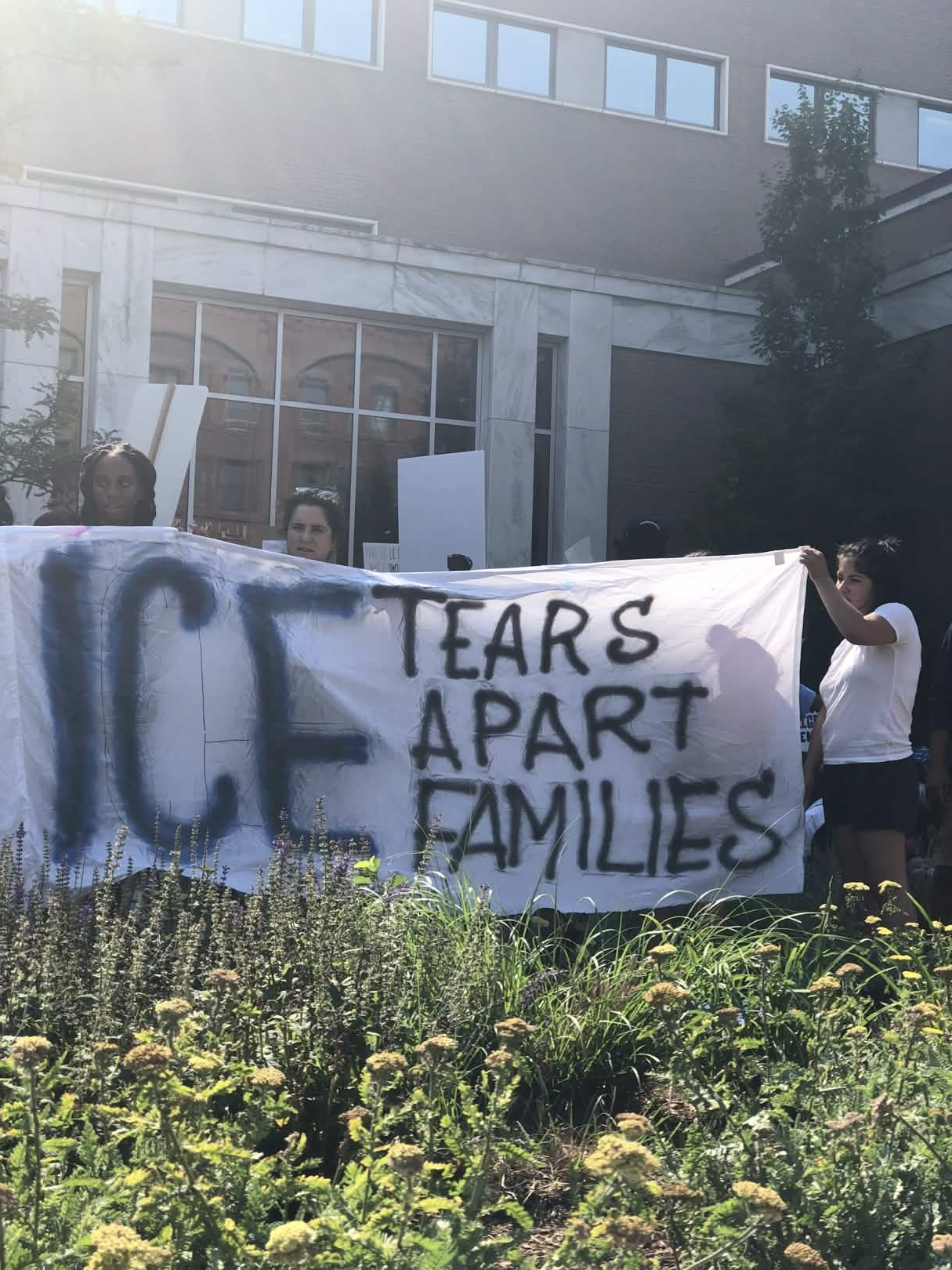
Protesters holding up a sign against ICE and their involvement in the Trump administrations's family separation policy

On April 6, 2018, Attorney General Jeff Sessions announced a "zero tolerance policy" directing federal prosecutors to criminally charge all individuals who crossed the border without authorization, including parents with children. Because children could not accompany parents to federal jail, they were reclassified as unaccompanied and placed in ORR custody, resulting in forced separations. A pilot program had been separating families in El Paso since mid-2017.

Between mid-April and June 20, 2018, over 2,500 children were separated. Including the pilot and later separations, the total reached an estimated 5,500. There was no centralized database linking parents to children, and hundreds of parents were deported without them. The DOJ Inspector General found in January 2021 that Sessions and senior officials were the "driving force" behind the policy and were aware it would cause separations.

After leaked audio of children crying for parents, bipartisan condemnation, and nationwide protests, President Trump signed Executive Order 13841 on June 20, 2018, directing DHS to keep families together. The order did not end the zero tolerance policy or address already-separated children. Six days later, Judge Dana Sabraw issued a nationwide preliminary injunction in Ms. L v. ICE ordering reunification.

==== Tornillo and Homestead facilities ====
The Tornillo tent city opened in June 2018 near El Paso, initially holding 360–400 children. It expanded repeatedly to 3,800 beds across 101 tents. At its peak roughly 2,800 teenagers were held there, and nearly 6,200 cycled through during seven months of operation. The facility cost approximately $775 per child per night and, because it sat on federal land, was exempt from state inspections. Over 2,100 staff had not undergone FBI fingerprint background checks after ORR waived the requirement. It closed in January 2019.

The Homestead facility in Homestead, Florida, reopened in February 2018 as the only for-profit migrant child detention center, operated by Comprehensive Health Services. Also on federal land and exempt from state inspections, it held up to 2,350 children at $775 per day. It closed permanently in October 2019.

==== Title 42 and Remain in Mexico ====
The Migrant Protection Protocols ("Remain in Mexico"), announced in January 2019, returned over 71,000 non-Mexican asylum seekers to Mexican border cities to await hearings. At least 16,000 children, including nearly 500 infants, were sent to border cities where Human Rights Watch documented kidnapping incidents involving at least 38 children.

In March 2020, the administration invoked Title 42 public health authority to summarily expel migrants. Before the Biden administration exempted unaccompanied children in February 2021, CBP used Title 42 to expel nearly 16,000 unaccompanied children despite protections under the TVPRA.

=== Biden administration ===
President Biden signed Executive Order 14011 on February 2, 2021, creating the Interagency Task Force on the Reunification of Families. The DOJ formally rescinded zero tolerance. By February 2023, the Task Force had identified 3,924 separated children and reunified over 2,900; however, roughly 1,000 remained separated.

In FY2021, ORR received a record 122,731 unaccompanied children. The administration opened emergency intake sites at convention centers and military bases, including Fort Bliss, which peaked at 4,800 children. Numbers remained high through FY2023 (118,938 referrals) before declining.

In March 2021, ICE effectively ended long-term family detention, releasing families within 72 hours. By late 2021, ICE had stopped detaining families entirely.

A 2023 New York Times investigation revealed widespread child labor exploitation among released unaccompanied minors. A 2024 HHS Office of Inspector General report found gaps in sponsor vetting during the 2021 surge. In October 2023, the government reached a settlement in Ms. L v. ICE providing reunification services and setting standards to limit future separations for eight years.

=== Trump administration second term ===
The second Trump administration revived family detention at the South Texas Family Residential Center in Dilley and the Karnes County Residential Center in March 2025. According to an analysis by The Marshall Project, ICE held approximately 170 children per day on average under the second Trump administration, a sixfold increase from the approximately 25 per day during the final 16 months of the Biden administration. On some days, ICE held more than 400 children. At least 3,800 children had been booked into ICE custody between January and mid-October 2025, and at least 1,000 were held longer than the Flores-prescribed 20-day limit.

In May 2025, the administration moved to terminate the Flores Settlement entirely. Judge Gee denied the motion on August 16, 2025.

The detention of Liam Conejo Ramos, a 5-year-old U.S. citizen detained with his father at the Dilley facility after an immigration enforcement operation in Minneapolis, Minnesota, drew national attention in January 2026. News of Liam's detention sparked protests both inside and outside the Dilley facility; detained families chanted for release, and state police used pepper spray on protesters outside. A February 2026 The New York Times investigation found that, unlike previous iterations of family detention that primarily held recent border crossers, many children at Dilley had been living in the United States for years and attending American schools before being detained during routine ICE check-ins or enforcement operations. As of mid-January 2026, approximately 500 children were being held at Dilley alongside 450 parents. Children received roughly one hour of instruction per day in mixed-age groups, often consisting of basic worksheets; lawyers representing detained children in a class-action case called the offerings inadequate under the Flores Settlement's education requirements. Two confirmed cases of measles were reported at the facility. DHS responded that families could avoid detention by accepting voluntary departure, including a $2,600 payment and a flight; the agency disputed allegations of inadequate medical care. In court documents, families described moldy and worm-filled food, foul-tasting water, and children resorting to self-harm. Immigration attorneys reported that many detained families had pending cases and had been taken into custody during routine check-ins rather than because they posed any danger.

A February 2026 ProPublica report published letters and drawings from eight children detained at Dilley, most of whom had been living in the United States before their detention.

I am Maria Antonia Guerra Montoya and I have been 113 days in detention I miss my friends and I feel they are going to forget me. ... I felt that being here was my fault and I only wanted to be on vacation like a normal family.

A 14-year-old from Honduras who had lived in Hicksville, New York for nearly seven years described the facility as a place where "all you will feel is sadness and mostly depression" and reported receiving no school time during 45 days of detention. A 12-year-old from Venezuela detained for 60 days wrote that when detainees sought medical attention, "the only thing they tell you is to drink more water and the worst thing is that it seems the water is what makes people sick here."

== Statistics ==
=== Unaccompanied children referred to ORR ===
ORR referrals by fiscal year
Fiscal year	Referrals
FY2012	13,625
FY2014	57,496
FY2016	59,170
FY2019	69,488
FY2020	15,381
FY2021	122,731
FY2022	128,904
FY2023	118,938
FY2024	98,356

In FY2024, children came primarily from Guatemala (32%), Honduras (20%), Mexico (20%), and El Salvador (8%). About 64% were over age 14 and 61% were male. Primary languages were Spanish (88%), Haitian Creole (3.3%), and several indigenous Mayan languages.

== Conditions and oversight ==
Government watchdog agencies have repeatedly documented dangerous conditions in facilities housing immigrant children. A July 2019 DHS Office of Inspector General report on Rio Grande Valley facilities found over 2,500 unaccompanied children held past the 72-hour transfer limit, more than 50 children under age 7 held over two weeks, and three of five facilities not providing showers or clean clothes. Senior managers called the situation "a ticking time bomb."

CBP holding cells have been widely described as hieleras (iceboxes) by detainees due to their cold temperatures. Between October 2014 and July 2018, ORR received 4,556 complaints of sexual abuse against unaccompanied minors in care facilities, 178 involving adult staff.

At least six children died in or shortly after CBP custody between 2018 and 2019, including Jakelin Caal Maquin, a 7-year-old Q'eqchi' girl from Guatemala who died December 8, 2018, and Felipe Gómez Alonzo, an 8-year-old Chuj boy from Guatemala who died December 24, 2018. Dr. Fiona Danaher of Massachusetts General Hospital testified before the House Homeland Security Committee that both deaths were preventable with timely access to pediatric medical care.

== Legal cases ==
=== Ms. L v. ICE ===
Filed February 26, 2018, in the Southern District of California by the ACLU, the case challenged family separations on behalf of a Congolese mother separated from her 7-year-old daughter. On June 26, 2018, Judge Sabraw certified a nationwide class and ordered reunification. In October 2023, the parties reached a comprehensive settlement providing services and limiting future separations for eight years.

=== Lucas R. v. Azar ===
Filed in 2018, this case challenged violations of children's rights in ORR custody regarding restrictive placements and psychotropic medication administered without safeguards. In January 2024, the court granted preliminary approval of three related settlements.

== Health effects ==
The American Academy of Pediatrics declared in a 2017 policy statement that DHS facilities "do not meet the basic standards for the care of children in residential settings." In 2025, the AAP joined the American Medical Association and eight other medical organizations in stating that "there is no evidence that any amount of time in detention is safe for children."

A 2025 systematic review in the British Journal of Psychiatry (21 studies, N=9,620) found pooled prevalence of 42.2% for depression and 32.0% for PTSD among detained children. A 2018 systematic review in BMC Psychiatry (26 studies) found detention duration was positively associated with severity of symptoms.

== International context ==
The United States is the only United Nations member state that has not ratified the Convention on the Rights of the Child (CRC), which requires in Article 37(b) that detention of children be "a measure of last resort and for the shortest appropriate period of time."

The Inter-American Court of Human Rights ruled in Advisory Opinion OC-21/14 (August 19, 2014) that the detention of children for migration-related reasons is "in all cases, arbitrary and contrary to the interests of the child." The UN Committee on the Rights of the Child and the Committee on Migrant Workers issued a joint general comment in 2017 calling on states to "expeditiously and completely cease" the immigration detention of children.

In January 2026, UN experts expressed alarm that average ORR custody times had increased significantly and that children were being pressured to accept payments to self-deport or face indefinite detention.

== See also ==
- Flores Settlement Agreement
- Trump administration family separation policy
- Tornillo tent city
- Homestead Temporary Shelter for Unaccompanied Children
- South Texas Family Residential Center
- Detention of Liam Conejo Ramos
- Family immigration detention in the United States
- Office of Refugee Resettlement
- Immigration detention in the United States
- Convention on the Rights of the Child
- Jakelin Caal Maquin
- Felipe Gómez Alonzo
