= Texas's 125th House of Representatives district =

American legislative district

Texas's 125th State House of Representatives district
Representative
Ray Lopez; D–San Antonio
- Demographics: 22.7% White; 7.0% Black; 66.3% Hispanic; 4.6% Asian
- Population (2020) • Voting age: 202,784; 151,994

The 125th district of the Texas House of Representatives contains parts of Bexar County. The current representative is Ray Lopez, who was first elected in 2019.

== List of representatives ==
- Art Reyna (1997–2003)
- Joaquin Castro (2003–2013)
- Justin Rodriguez (2013–2019)
- Ray Lopez (2019–present)
