= Adrian Reyna =

American politician

Member-elect of the Texas House of Representatives from the 125th district
- Assuming office January 2027
- Succeeding: Ray Lopez

Personal details
- Party: Democratic
- Parent: Art Reyna (father)

Adrian Reyna is an American politician. A member of the Democratic Party, he is the member-elect for the 125th district of the Texas House of Representatives.
