= Family immigration detention in the United States =

Family detention is the detention of multiple family members together in an immigration detention context. In the U.S. they are referred to as family detention camps, family detention centers, or family detention facilities.

Families crossing the United States border without a visa or other papers demonstrating they are admissible to the country are currently subject to detention by Customs and Border Protection. The U.S. Department of Homeland Security defines only those children traveling with their parents or legal guardians as part of "family units" and all other children as "unaccompanied minors." Adults traveling with children are required by Customs and Border Protection to verify their legal or biological parentage, and if they cannot, the children are deemed unaccompanied. As a result, children traveling with grandparents, adult siblings, and aunts and uncles are separated and referred to the Unaccompanied Alien Children program. Since 2017, the government separated some children from their parents as well under a family separation policy, although this policy was officially rescinded in June 2018. As of December 2021, under the Biden administration, family immigration detention is no longer being used. In March 2023 it was widely reported that the Biden administration was considering restarting the practice of detaining migrant families who cross the border illegally. As of October 2023, the Biden administration has not restarted this practice, opting instead to release families into the United States temporarily and "using ankle bracelets, traceable cellphones or other methods to keep track of them."

== History ==
In 2014 the Obama administration opened new family detention centers in the United States. At the time there was only one government-operated facility, which was located York County, Pennsylvania.

In 2015, intact families were not regularly separated at the United States border.

In February 2016, the designation Family Unit Aliens or FMUA was introduced. The majority of families apprehended at the border were not linked to fraud according to an official within U.S. Customs and Border Protection.

In July 2016, the United States Court of Appeals for the Ninth Circuit upheld a lower court's decision (in July 2015, by Judge Dolly Gee) to quickly release child migrants from family detention even when accompanied by a parent.

In 2017 and 2018, the number of family units (groups of at least one adult and at least one child) from Guatemala and Honduras detained by the U.S. increased, as families fled gang violence and instability in Central America.

In March 2021, shortly after Joe Biden became president, ICE announced that no families were being held at the Berks County Residential Center any more, and that the detention center would no longer be used for family detention. The other two family detention centers, Dilley and Karnes, were now to be used only for holding families for short, three-day periods. In December 2021, Axios reported that ICE would stop engaging in family detention for the time being, and officials confirmed this.

In the mid-2020s, family immigration detention continued to attract judicial attention, with several high-profile cases bringing attention to the role of federal courts in reviewing immigration detention of minors and families. In January 2026, a five-year-old child was detained along with his father by Immigration and Customs Enforcement (ICE) in a federal immigration enforcement operation in Minnesota. The case gained national attention after an image of the child in detention began to circulate across the US. Ultimately, a federal judge ordered the immediate release of the child and his father, citing concerns over the legality and humanity of detaining a minor during ongoing immigration proceedings. The case was raised in the context of judicial supervision of family immigration detention and the handling of children in the US immigration system.

Following the return to widespread interior enforcement under the second Trump administration starting in 2025, family separations ended up happening on a scale that exceeded the 2018 policy, according to a 2026 Brookings report. According to research from the Brookings Institution, more than 200,000 children have been separated from at least one parent as a result of immigration policies enacted during the Trump administration. In addition, the institution’s findings indicate that around 145,000 children who are U.S. citizens have experienced separation from their families by U.S. Immigration and Customs Enforcement (ICE).

== Families detained by Customs and Border Protection ==
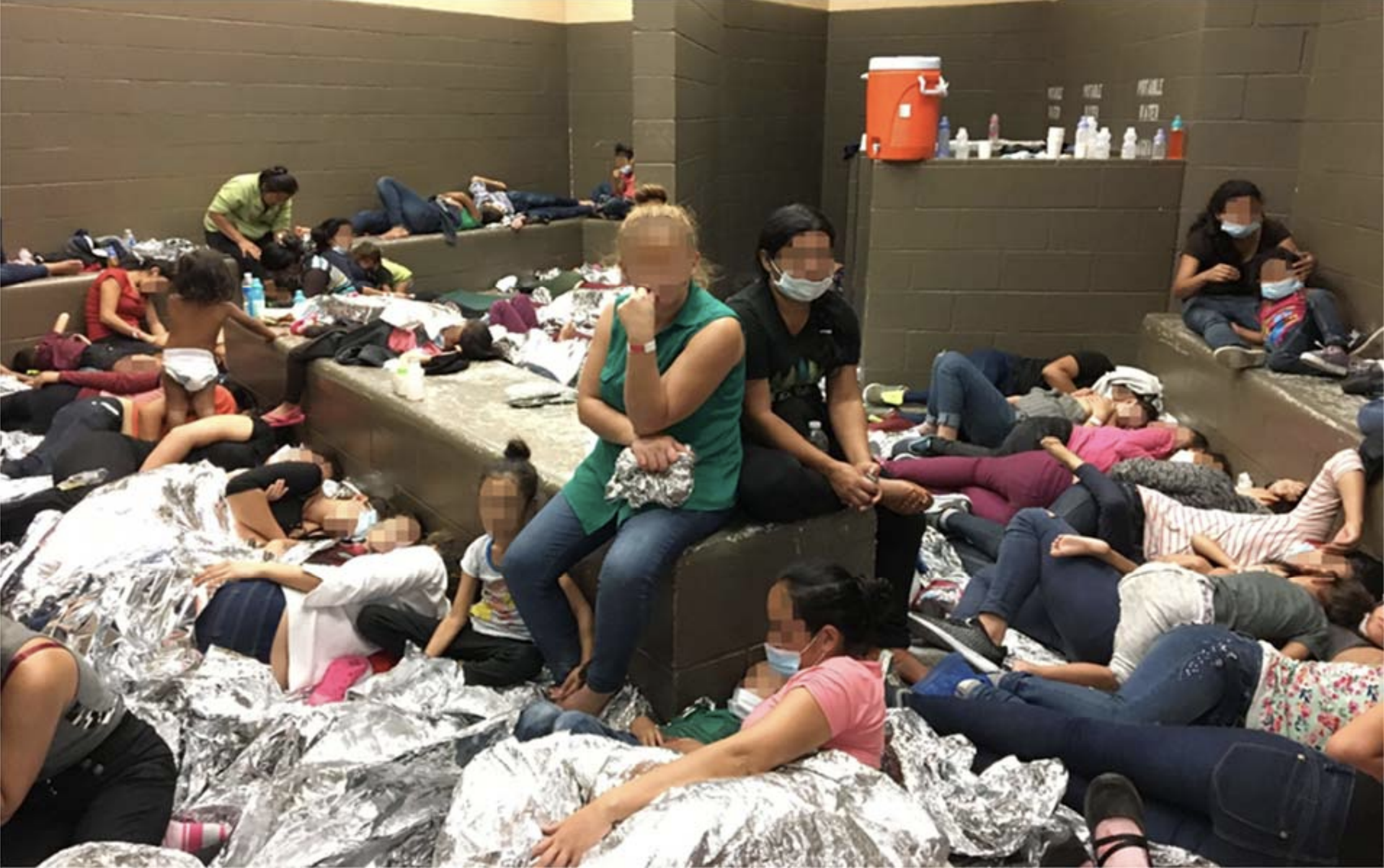
Overcrowding of families observed by the DHS Office of the Inspector General on June 11, 2019, at Border Patrol’s Weslaco, TX, Station.

Customs and Border Protection (CBP), an agency of the Department of Homeland Security, holds immigrant families after their initial arrest. Under departmental standards, CBP should transfer them to Immigration and Customs Enforcement within 72 hours, but in 2019, many such families are being held for weeks in CBP custody. On June 13, 2019, the government reported that 4,865 members of "family units" were held by the CBP.

== Family detention centers in the United States ==
The U.S. Immigration and Customs Enforcement contracts with several facilities to detain families with children. The General Accounting Office reports that the 3 active facilities have a combined capacity of 3,326 people. Active family detention centers include:

- South Texas Family Residential Center in Dilley, Texas. This privately owned center is operated by CoreCivic (formerly the Corrections Corporation of America). The facility can hold 2,400 people and had 2,000 inmates in early June 2018. As of June 18, 2019, the Dilley facility held 1,628 family members in detention.
- Berks County Residential Center in Leesport, Pennsylvania. This county-operated facility opened in 2011 as a 96-bed facility with space for 200 people. It was 59% full in early June 2018. ICE reported 9 people being held in April 2019. In June 2019, Pennsylvania's Auditor General opened an investigation into reports of sexual abuse, inadequate health care, and other human rights abuses in the facility. In March 2021, the detention center was shut down for family detention.
- Karnes County Residential Center (KCRC) in Karnes City, Texas. This privately operated center is run by the GEO Group. The facility opened in 2012, and was designated a family residential unit in 2014. The facility can hold 830 people and was 66% full in early June 2018. In March 2019, ICE moved to repurpose the Karnes County facility to primarily hold adult women; its family detention population was reduced from 563 people in early March to 25 people in April. In June 2019, ICE reported that the facility would be adults-only "at least through July."

=== Former family detention facilities ===
Former family detention centers include:

- T. Don Hutto Residential Center in Taylor, Texas. This privately owned center is operated by CoreCivic (formerly the Corrections Corporation of America). The facility opened in May 2006, and housed 400 immigrants including 170 children in February 2007. ICE used the facility for family detention until 2009. The American Civil Liberties Union filed a lawsuit in Federal court objecting to conditions at Hutto. Under terms of a 2009 settlement, ICE no longer holds children at Hutto, but continues to detain adult immigrant women at the facility.
- Artesia Family Residential Center in Artesia, New Mexico. A government-operated facility on the premises of the Federal Law Enforcement Training Center that operated from June 2014 to December 2014, with space for 700 people. On November 20, 2014, the government announced it would transfer remaining detainees to the center in Karnes City, Texas. During the facility's operation, the Department of Homeland Security implemented a "no bond or high bond" strategy to make it difficult for women to leave the facility while awaiting immigration hearings.

=== Proposed family detention facilities ===
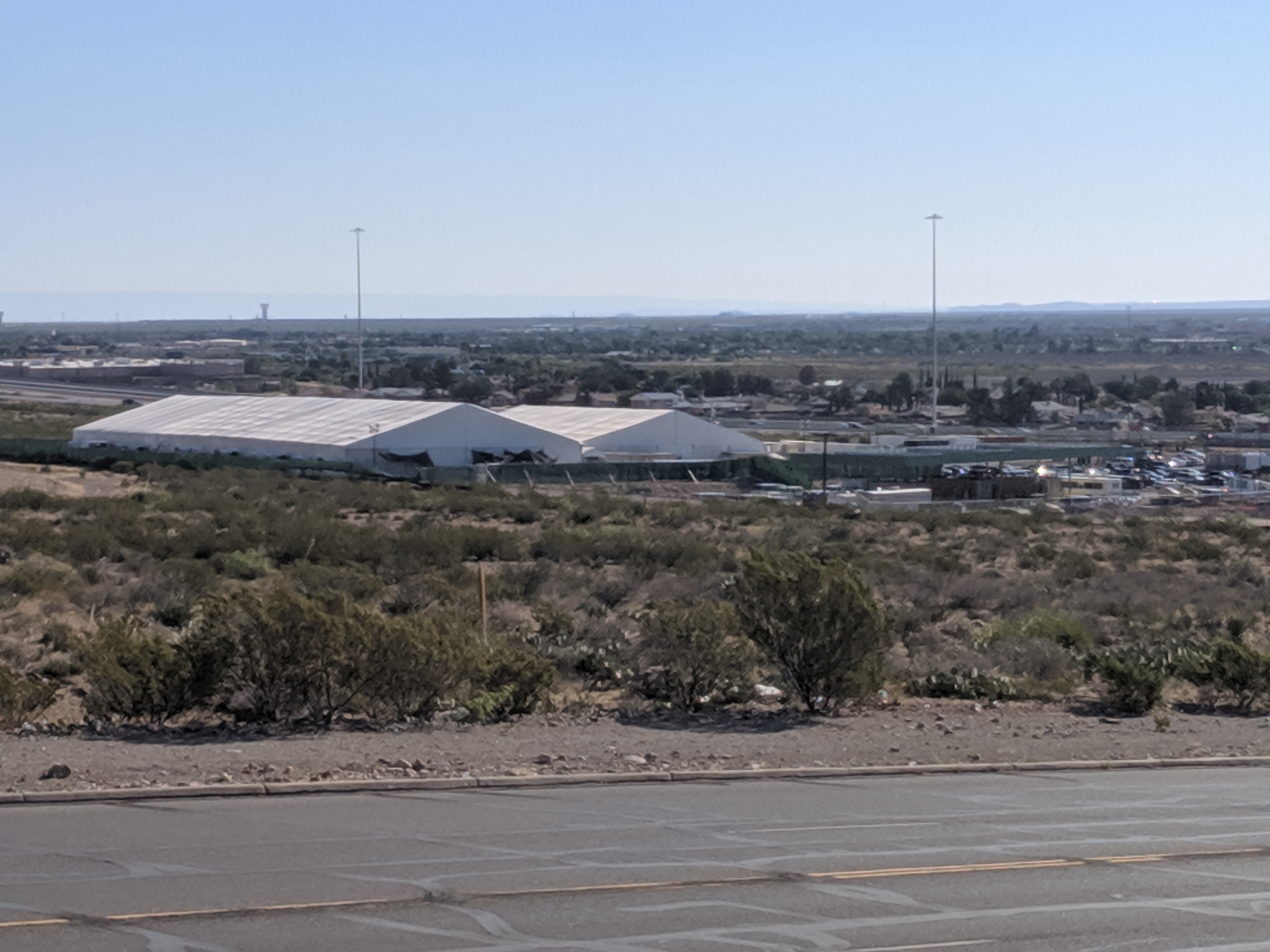
Border Patrol Tents in El Paso Texas on Hondo Pass 2019

Executive Order 13841, signed on June 20, 2018, instructs that, "The Secretary of Defense shall take all legally available measures to provide to the Secretary, upon request, any existing facilities available for the housing and care of alien families, and shall construct such facilities if necessary and consistent with law." On June 21, the Department of Health and Human Services requested facilities to house migrant children. Pentagon spokesmen and a memorandum sent to Congress confirmed that the Department of Defense was preparing facilities at four military bases in Texas and Arkansas to house 20,000 "unaccompanied alien children."

- Fort Bliss, near El Paso, Texas—On June 25, 2018 the Associated Press reported that Fort Bliss had been chosen to house migrant families.
- A large tent facility was being built at the Border Patrol Station in Northeast El Paso on Hondo Pass in April 2019.
- England AFB Heritage Park, on the same site as Alexandria International Airport (Louisiana), the largest United States hub for deportation flights, is a site for construction of a family and children detention facility.

== See also ==
- Flores Agreement
- Children in immigration detention in the United States
