= Art Reyna =

American politician

Art Reyna Jr.

Member of the Texas House of Representatives from the 125th district
- In office 1997–2003
- Succeeded by: Joaquin Castro

Personal details
- Party: Democratic
- Children: Adrian Reyna

Arthur (Art) Reyna is an American politician from Texas.

== Political career ==
He represented District 125 in the Texas House of Representatives from 1997 to 2003. In 2019, he was a candidate for a special election in the same district but was eliminated in the democratic primary. He is a member of the city council in Leon Valley, Texas.
