= Deaths of Jakelin Caal and Felipe Gómez Alonzo =

2018 deaths of migrant children

Jakelin Amei Rosmery Caal Maquin (2011 – December 8, 2018) and Felipe Gómez Alonzo (2010 – December 24, 2018) were Guatemalan immigrant children who died, in separate incidents, while in the custody of the United States Border Patrol in December 2018, after having entered the country, by crossing the border between Mexico and the United States.

Caal was a seven-year-old Qʼeqchiʼ girl from the Guatemalan department of Alta Verapaz who died from dehydration, shock and liver failure while in Border Patrol custody, having entered the country with her father, Nery Caal.

Gómez Alonzo was an eight-year-old Chuj boy from the Guatemalan department of Huehuetenango who died on Christmas Eve. He was diagnosed with a cold, but not tested for influenza, a condition that was confirmed only after his death.

Both deaths sparked controversy, with some blaming the immigration policies of the Trump administration, and others blaming the families and arguing that the deaths were a hazard of illegal immigration. The two were initially thought to have been the first immigrant children to die in U.S. custody since 2010, but in May 2019, it was revealed that another immigrant child had died under these circumstances some three months before Caal and Alonzo, in September 2018.

== Circumstances ==
=== Jakelin Caal ===
Caal and her father, 29-year-old Nery Caal, came from the indigenous community of Raxruhá, a Qʼeqchiʼ region of Alta Verapaz, Guatemala. In December 2018, they entered the U.S. from Mexico, outside of Antelope Wells, New Mexico. Initial reports stated that the girl had been without food or water for the last several days of the journey, but her family disputes that claim. The Department of Homeland Security (DHS) issued a statement indicating that DHS personnel conducted an initial screening when the girl was taken into custody, and that "[t]he initial screening revealed no evidence of health issues". Caal was among a large group of immigrants who turned themselves in to authorities upon reaching the New Mexico border on December 6, 2018. They were placed on a bus, and her father indicated that she was feverish and vomiting. No medical attention was provided until they arrived at a border patrol facility ninety minutes later. Eight hours after being taken into custody, Caal began to experience seizures, and her body temperature spiked to 105.7 °F (40.9 °C). She was then airlifted to a hospital in El Paso, Texas, where she died the following day.

Caal's body was transported by plane from Laredo, Texas, to Guatemala on Sunday, December 23, 2018, there to be returned to Raxruha. On March 29, 2019, an autopsy report was released finding that the cause of death was streptococcal sepsis, a kind of bacterial infection. The Associated Press reported that "traces of streptococcus bacteria were found in Jakelin's lungs, adrenal gland, liver, and spleen", a condition leading to failure of multiple organs.

=== Felipe Gómez Alonzo ===
Gómez Alonzo and his father, Agustin Gómez, were Chuj-speaking migrants from Yalambojoch, a settlement in the municipality of Nentón, in the department of Huehuetenango, described as "a poor community of returnees from Mexico who had fled Guatemala in the bloodiest years of that country's 1960–1996 civil war". The father and son left Guatemala after hearing rumors "that parents and children would be allowed to migrate to the United States". They were apprehended at the border in New Mexico on December 18, 2018, and taken to a facility in El Paso, Texas. They were then transferred to a facility in Alamogordo, New Mexico, remaining in Border Patrol custody on December 24, when Gómez Alonzo first began to show symptoms of illness. Gómez Alonzo's family members have said that the child "wasn't sick on the way; he wasn't sick here". However, while in custody he developed a 103 °F (39.4 °C) fever. He was taken to the hospital where he was diagnosed with a common cold and a fever, but was not tested for influenza. He was prescribed amoxicillin and ibuprofen, and was released that afternoon. Gómez Alonzo later began vomiting, and was taken back to the hospital, where he died minutes before midnight on December 24, 2018.

== Responses ==
Caal's death drew responses from high-profile figures, with Hillary Clinton tweeting:

There are no words to capture the horror of a seven-year-old girl dying of dehydration in U.S. custody. What's happening at our borders is a humanitarian crisis.

Other politicians and celebrities addressed this death from various positions, some arguing that it was the fault of the girl's family for taking her on the arduous journey from Guatemala to the United States, and others arguing that the immigration policies of the Trump administration contributed to the death. A letter from five members of Congress requested that the acting inspector general of DHS investigate the death, stating:

Due to the seriousness of this tragedy and the many questions that remain, we request you initiate an investigation into this incident as well as CBP policies or practices that may have contributed to the child's death.

The letter was signed by Jerrold Nadler, Zoe Lofgren, Joaquín Castro, Pramila Jayapal, and Lucille Roybal-Allard. Congressman Beto O'Rourke said, "we are causing suffering and in the case of Jakelin, seven years old, we are causing death". In El Paso, Texas, protesters demanded that the death be investigated.

Homeland Security Secretary Kirstjen Nielsen stated that Caal's death was "a very sad example of the dangers of this journey", and that "this family chose to cross illegally". White House Deputy Press Secretary Hogan Gidley denied that the Trump administration had any responsibility "for a parent taking a child on a trek through Mexico to get to this country". On December 15, 2018, NPR journalist Scott Simon opened on a story on the death by saying, "I do not doubt that U.S. Customs and Border Protection agents did all they could to try to save the life of Jakelin Caal Maquin, a seven-year-old girl from Guatemala, who died in the custody of the United States." Journalist Jon Schwarz from The Intercept responded with a string of replies criticizing Simon on Twitter.

Gómez Alonzo's death, coming less than three weeks later, was immediately compared to Caal's death, and similarly led to calls from lawmakers to investigate the death, and to draft legislation to prevent further incidents of this type. Doctors questioned whether Gómez Alonzo's death was in part attributable to the failure of border patrol personnel to administer a flu test, and Colleen Kraft, president of the American Academy of Pediatrics, specifically found that Gómez Alonzo "wasn't appreciated to be as ill as he was", and that "clearly his treatment wasn't adequate".

The Guardian noted that these were not the only deaths of immigrants in the custody of U.S. agencies tasked with policing immigration, with a 19-month-old girl having died in May 2018, and 12 additional people having died in 2018 at adult detention centers. In response to Gómez Alonzo's death, Secretary Nielsen said that the U.S. immigration system had been "pushed to a breaking point by those who seek open borders", requiring changes in detention procedures. On December 29, 2018, President Donald Trump addressed the issue for the first time, tweeting:

Any deaths of children or others at the Border are strictly the fault of the Democrats and their pathetic immigration policies that allow people to make the long trek thinking they can enter our country illegally.

Trump further claimed in his tweet that building a wall between the United States and Mexico would prevent people with children from even attempting to immigrate. Trump revived interest in the death of Jakelin Caal three months later, on March 30, 2019, when he incorrectly stated to reporters that "the father gave the child no water for a long period of time" and that the father "actually admitted blame". However, Fox News reported an Associated Press fact checking piece that noted that: "Neither the autopsy report, nor accounts at the time by Customs and Border Protection, spoke of dehydration".

== Further revelations of immigrant child deaths ==
In late May 2019, it was revealed that another immigrant child, Darlyn Cristabel Cordova-Valle of El Salvador, had died under these circumstances some three months before Caal and Alonzo, in September 2018. Dean Obeidallah asserted that the failure of the Trump administration to report this death was a cover-up intended to influence the 2018 United States elections, and questioned whether the timely disclosure of that death would have "resulted in US Border Patrol, and others caring for these children, to change their procedures for the better, possibly saving the lives of the two young migrant children, seven-year-old Jakelin Caal and eight-year-old Felipe Gómez Alonzo".

As of May 2019, six migrant children had died while in U.S. custody.

== See also ==
- Death of Carlos Ernesto Escobar Mejía
