= Detention of Liam Conejo Ramos =

2026 ICE child detainment in Minnesota, US

- Part of Operation Metro Surge
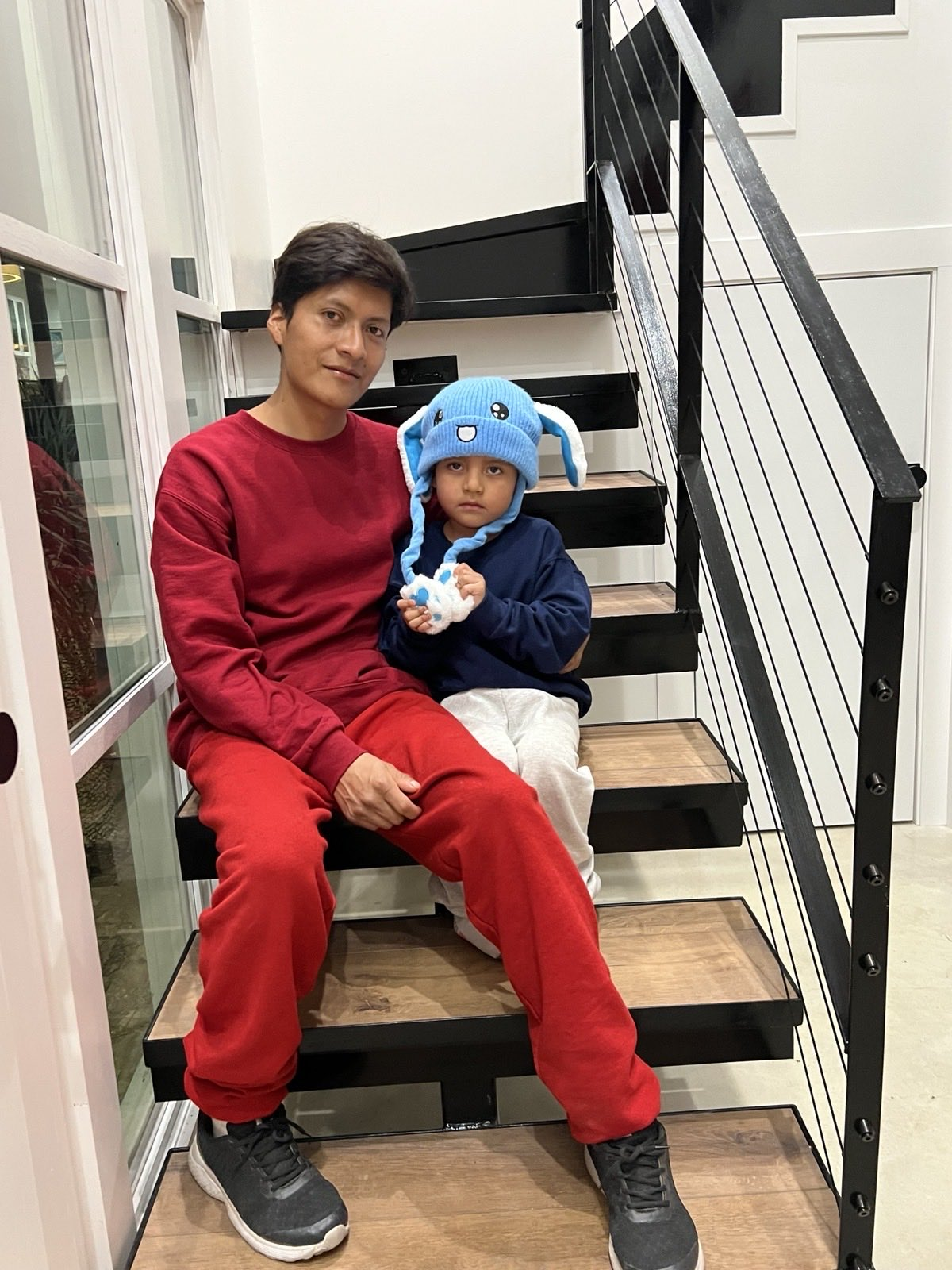
- Liam with his father after release from detention
- Date: January 20, 2026; 9 months ago
- Location: Columbia Heights, Minnesota, United States Dilley Immigration Processing Center, Texas, United States
- Type: Detention of a child
- Perpetrator: United States Immigration and Customs Enforcement
- Outcome: Release, invalidation of asylum claim, deportation order

On January 20, 2026, US Immigration and Customs Enforcement (ICE) agents detained Liam Conejo Ramos, a five-year-old boy, on his walk home from school in Columbia Heights, Minnesota, amid the Operation Metro Surge deployment to the Minneapolis–Saint Paul metropolitan area. The child and his father Adrian Conejo Arias each had an active claim for asylum in the United States. ICE claims the father fled and left the child in the car. The family alleges that the father didn't resist, or flee. According to witness statements and the family's attorney, there were multiple adults available to take custody of Liam, but ICE arrested him anyway. ICE's statement was that Liam wasn’t targeted and that an officer stayed with the child while other officers apprehended his father. Officers attempted to get his mother, who was inside the house, to take custody of the boy, indicating she would not be detained for taking custody but she believed the child was being used to lure her out.

According to Spain's El País newspaper, "Images of [Conejo Ramos], wearing his blue hat and carrying a Spider-Man backpack, guarded by federal agents, instantly became a symbol of the indiscriminate nature of President Donald Trump’s immigration crackdown in the United States".

The case has become a cause célèbre, with numerous people expressing outrage on a child being detained by ICE.

== Background ==
The Conejo Ramos family is from Ecuador and entered the United States in 2024 to request asylum. According to their attorney, the father and son had a pending asylum case and no order of deportation at the time of their detention. Government records indicate their immigration court case was docketed on December 17, 2024.

== Detention ==
On January 20, 2026, Conejo Ramos, a prekindergarten student at Valley View Elementary, was approached by masked ICE agents as he returned home from school with his father. According to school officials, they took the boy to the door of the house and used him as "bait" to get the residents to open the door. According to ICE, the father abandoned Liam in the driveway as he tried to flee, and ICE protected the child from the cold, a claim that was contradicted by many witnesses. At the same time, ICE claimed that Liam's mother was inside the house. School officials suggested the pregnant mother was likely fearful of opening the door.

Liam and his father, in the custody of three plainclothes federal agents, took a scheduled Delta Air Lines flight to San Antonio en route to the Dilley Immigration Processing Center in Texas. According to their lawyer, the family immigrated to the US in 2024 from Ecuador and has an active asylum claim. Conejo Ramos was the fourth student at the Columbia Heights School District to be detained by ICE. Earlier the same day, a 17-year-old student was taken from his car by ICE agents.

== Legal proceedings ==
On January 27, Federal Judge Fred Biery of the U.S. District Court for the Western District of Texas ordered the US government to not deport the father and son, nor remove them from the court's jurisdiction while the two pursued a legal challenge to their detention. On January 31, Biery ordered that Ramos and his father be released.

In his statement, Biery chose harsh words. He condemned the detention of Liam and his father as driven by "perfidious lust for unbridled power". Biery stated further that "[this] case has its genesis in the ill-conceived and incompetently-implemented government pursuit of daily deportation quotas, apparently even if it requires traumatizing children." He ended the judicial order with the viral photo of Liam being detained, accompanied by two Bible verses: Matthew 19:14 ("Jesus said, 'Let the little children come to me, and do not hinder them, for the kingdom of heaven belongs to such as these'") and John 11:35 ("Jesus wept").

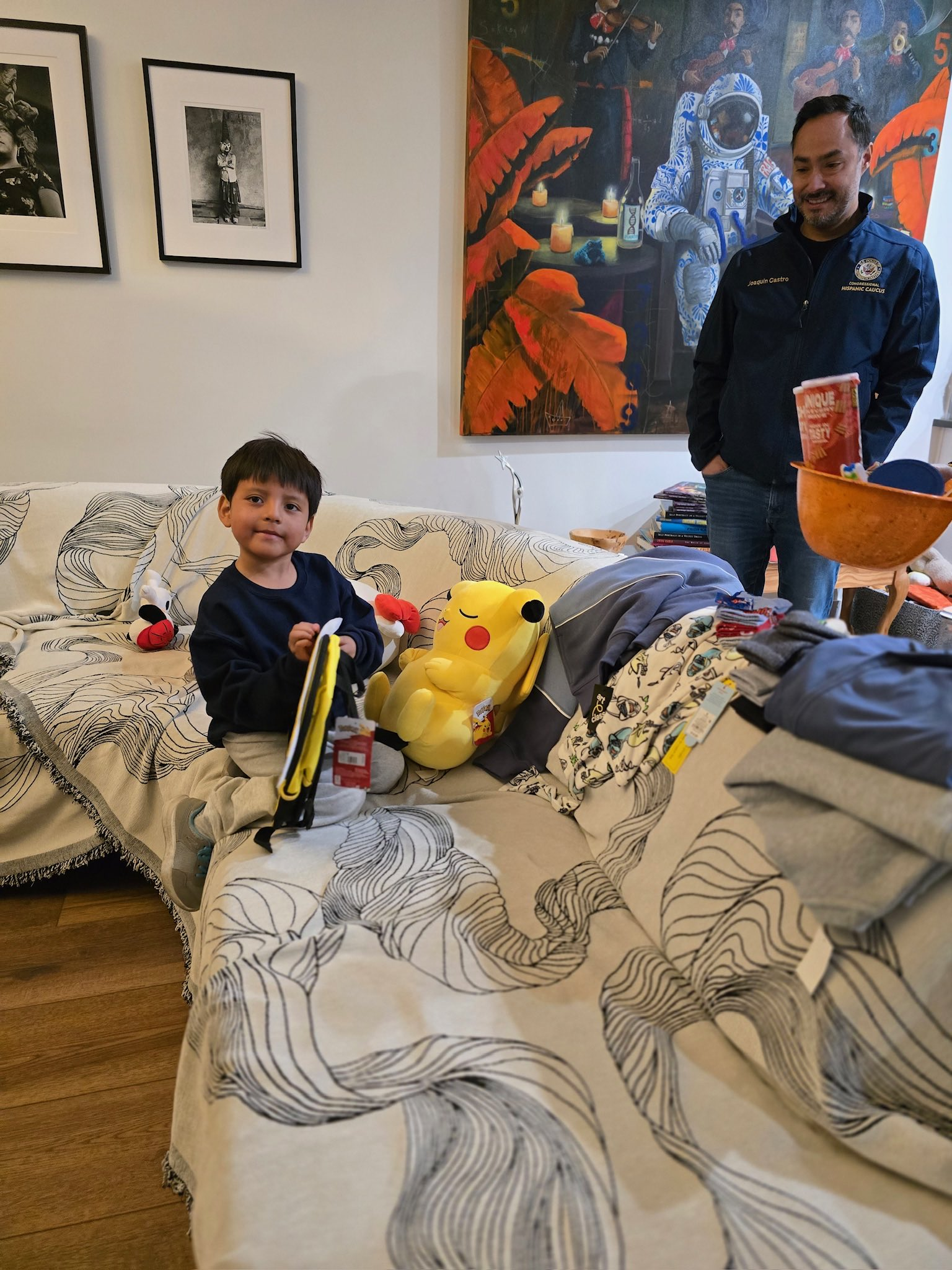
Liam at his home with congressman Joaquin Castro

On February 1, Liam Conejo Ramos and his father, Adrian, were released and returned to Minneapolis. Upon learning of the news, Lieutenant governor Peggy Flanagan said "We cannot stop until Liam, and all the children ICE has detained, are back in their own beds." Meanwhile, Democratic Representative Joaquin Castro, who had been supporting the Ramos family and advocating for their return, said: "Thank you to folks all across the country and around the world for speaking out in support of Liam and so many other children in detention."

In March 2026, US immigration judge John Burns ruled that Conejo Ramos’s asylum claim was invalid and ordered his immediate deportation to his home country. Conejo Ramos’s attorneys filed an appeal against the judge’s decision.

== Public response ==
On January 24, dozens of detained children at the Dilley detention facility staged a demonstration in the detention center's yard, shouting "libertad" (Spanish for 'freedom'). Columbia Heights Public Schools Superintendent Zena Stenvik noted that the district received an outpouring of support, with community members creating origami rabbits in solidarity with Liam, whose surname Conejo means 'rabbit' in Spanish.

== See also ==
- Children in immigration detention in the United States
- Operation Metro Surge
- Death of Wael Tarabishi
- Killing of Alex Pretti – 2026 shooting by US Border Patrol agents
- Killing of Renée Good – 2026 shooting by a US immigration agent
- Second presidency of Donald Trump
  - Domestic policy of the second Trump administration § Immigration
- Timeline of Trump's second presidency
- ICE Out
