= Israel Nuclear Letter =

The Israel Nuclear Letter is a May 4, 2026 letter written by 30 Democratic members of the United States House of Representatives to US Secretary of State Marco Rubio demanding the disclosure of details about Israel's secret nuclear weapons program, and that the United States "apply its nonproliferation standards equally". The letter was led by ranking member of the House Foreign Affairs Committee’s Western Hemisphere subcommittee Representative Joaquin Castro, who has stated his intention to publish the administration's response to the letter.

== Background ==
Israel is believed to have possessed nuclear weapons since the 1960s, but keeps a "policy of nuclear opacity, never officially confirming the existence of its nuclear weapons program and arsenal". Israel is not a party to the nuclear Nonproliferation Treaty. The Federation of American Scientists and the Nuclear Threat Initiative have publicly estimated Israel's nuclear arsenal at approximately 90 warheads.

The United States and Israeli governments have maintained Israel's nuclear ambiguity based on a tacit agreement between President Richard Nixon and Prime Minister Golda Meier in 1969. Successive US administrations have not publicly questioned Israel's undeclared nuclear status.

Attempts by the United States Congress to investigate Israel's nuclear weapons programs have been rare, with the most recent reference to Israel as a nuclear-armed nation by Representative James McGovern in 2019.

== Text ==
The letter demands that Congress be fully informed on the Executive Branch's intelligence on Israel's nuclear weapons program, writing, "Congress has a constitutional responsibility to be fully informed about the nuclear balance in the Middle East, the risk of escalation by any party to this conflict, and the administration’s planning and contingencies for such scenarios. We do not believe we have received that information."

The letter further referenced that the United States acknowledges all other nations with nuclear weapons programs, writing that, "The United States openly acknowledges the nuclear weapons programs of the United Kingdom, France, India, Pakistan, Russia, China, and North Korea. We ask that Israel be held to the same standard as any other foreign country, and that the United States government speaks candidly about its potential nuclear weapons capabilities, whatever they may be."

== Signatories ==
Signatories included Joaquin Castro (D-TX), Sara Jacobs (D-CA), Greg Casar (D-TX), Mark Pocan (D-WI), James P. McGovern (D-MA), Pramila Jayapal (D-WA), Jesús G. “Chuy” García (D-IL), Al Green (D-TX), Lloyd Doggett (D-TX), Jonathan L. Jackson (D-IL), Veronica Escobar (D-TX), Donald S. Beyer Jr. (D-VA), Nydia Velázquez (D-NY), Rashida Tlaib (D-MI), Ilhan Omar (D-MN), Lateefah Simon (D-CA), Alexandria Ocasio-Cortez (D-NY), Delia C. Ramirez (D-IL), Adelita S. Grijalva (D-AZ), Summer L. Lee (D-PA), Ro Khanna (D-CA), Sylvia R. Garcia (D-TX), Maxine Dexter (D-OR), Emily Randall (D-WA), Becca Balint (D-VT), Val Hoyle (D-OR), John Garamendi (D-CA), Mark DeSaulnier (D-CA), Ayanna Pressley (D-MA), Bonnie Watson Coleman (D-NJ).

== Reaction ==
Avner Cohen, a scholar on Israel's nuclear weapons program, described the letter as a break with a half-century taboo in American politics, writing that "This is something people had not dared to do before," adding, "raising these questions publicly is a departure from a bipartisan norm."

=== Support ===
On May 5, 2025, the Council on American-Islamic Relations (CAIR) issued a statement supporting the letter, writing "the congressional call for disclosure is a step toward honesty and fairness in policymaking," adding, "the American public deserves to know the full scope of U.S. involvement and positioning on nuclear weapons globally."

Scott McConnell, a co-founder of The American Conservative, wrote "We've fought two wars in this century to maintain Israel's nuclear monopoly," adding "Maybe that monopoly is a good and necessary thing, but maybe we can at least talk about it."

On May 8, 2026, Campaign for Nuclear Disarmament General Secretary Sophie Bolt issued a statement writing, "It’s encouraging to see steps being taken in the US to finally end decades of political ambiguity over one of the world’s worst kept secret. Israel’s nuclear weapons are a major block to a nuclear weapons-free Middle East and to a long-lasting peace settlement in the region."

=== Opposition ===
On June 1, 2026, Brian McDonald published an opinion piece in The Times of Israel criticizing the letter, describing it as "reckless". McDonald wrote that "A formal U.S. determination that Israel possesses nuclear weapons, precisely what the lawmakers are demanding, would automatically trigger the Symington and Glenn Amendments. That would cut off nearly all American military and economic assistance to Israel, currently about $3.8 billion per year plus emergency supplements."

== Reply ==
On June 1, 2026, Paul D. Guaglianone, a Senior Bureau Official at the Bureau of Legislative Affairs of the State Department wrote a formal reply to Castro's letter, writing that the "longstanding policy of the State Department, under multiple administrations of both parties, is not to comment publicly on specific platforms and postures," adding "We refer you to the Government of Israel for your questions about Israel's capabilities." Castro subsequently characterized the letter as a "bizarre response" to his letter.

On June 3, 2026, Rubio appeared before the House Foreign Affairs Committee, including ranking member Castro, in a hearing. When asked by Castro if Israel possessed nuclear weapons, Rubio refused to answer the United States government's position on the matter, saying, "If we’re speaking frankly, I think most of the world assesses that they do," adding, "They’ve never acknowledged that publicly, and as a feature of our foreign policy, for a variety of reasons, we don’t discuss it in that way either." Rubio subsequently suggested the issue be discussed in a private setting, adding that refusal to discuss Israel's nuclear weapons is a "feature" of US foreign policy.

Castro replied, "If they, in fact, possess nuclear weapons — and you’re right, in open-source reporting, that has come across — we don’t know what their red lines are for using those nuclear weapons," adding "And so, I guess I’m shocked that our government wouldn’t make an effort to know, to understand and then to give our oversight body the information that we need to make decisions about the war."

Rubio subsequently replied that Castro's request was "fair", and that he would be willing to discuss the answer in a classified format, saying, "These things require delicate balancing acts between different equities, but I think you can get, probably, a more fulsome answer if we were to be able to respond to that inquiry in a different context."

In a press release by Castro's office following the Committee meeting, Castro wrote "I am glad that Secretary Rubio acknowledged these serious concerns and I look forward to getting briefed on the matter."
