= Rosie Castro =

American civil rights activist

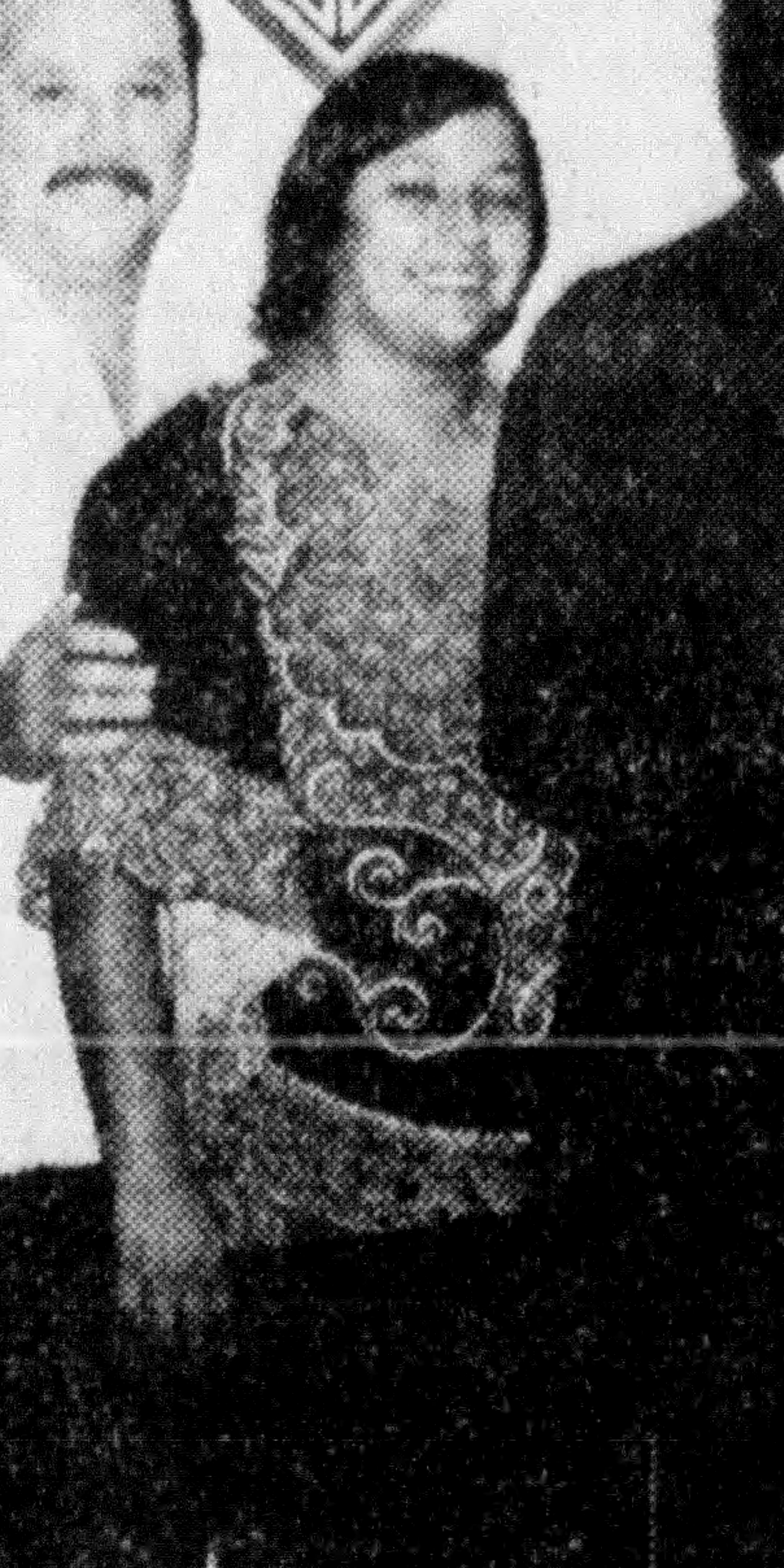
- Castro in 1977
- Born: Maria del Rosario Castro; 1947 (age 78–79); San Antonio, Texas, U.S.
- Education: Our Lady of the Lake University (BA); University of Texas at San Antonio (MPA)
- Political party: Democratic; Raza Unida
- Children: Julian; Joaquin

Maria del Rosario "Rosie" Castro (born 1947) is an American civil rights activist and educator who has been involved in several prominent groups, such as the Young Democrats of America, the Mexican American Youth Organization, the Committee for Barrio Betterment, and the Raza Unida Party. She is the mother of Democratic politicians Julian and Joaquin Castro.

== Early life and education ==
Born to Victoria Castro and Edward Perez, Rosie was raised by her mother and a guardian, Marcia Garcia, in San Antonio. Growing up in the San Antonio barrio, Castro cited the beginning of her interest in social justice in witnessing the racial and economic boundaries that affected her family, especially her mother.

With a scholarship from her valedictorian title and other financial means, she successfully enrolled at Our Lady of the Lake University, intending to become a teacher, before earning a degree in Spanish in 1971. At OLLU, she joined with the Catholic Youth Association, but took issue with the organization's lack of minority membership.

As an undergraduate, Castro first became involved in student activism through the Young Democrats, and organizing the campus-required Young Republicans chapter in response.

Castro earned a Master of Public Administration from University of Texas at San Antonio

== Career ==
Rosie first worked as a volunteer for Lyndon B. Johnson's 1964 presidential campaign. Later she joined with the Mexican American Unity Council. With MAUC, she participated in and helped to organize the organization’s boycott of the San Antonio Savings Association, a savings and loan operation headed by former San Antonio Mayor Walter McAllister.

Rosie was active during the "Free Angela Davis" campaign of 1971, and during this period she was under observation by the Federal Bureau of Investigation.

Castro worked with the Raza Unida Party's 1970s initiative to field Mexican-American candidates in Texas, serving as the Bexar County party chair. At the time, the RUP worked alongside the San Antonio Committee for Barrio Betterment to pursue positions in the city. With the CBB, Castro herself became a candidate in 1971 for the San Antonio City Council, finishing second in a field of four candidates.

Castro was interim dean of student affairs at Palo Alto College from 2008 until her retirement in 2013.

In March 2023, Castro was appointed to serve as the interim councilperson for City Council District 7 after Councilwoman Ana Sandoval's resignation. Her term ended on June 21, 2023 when Marina Alderete Gavito was sworn in to represent District 7.

== Personal life ==
On September 16, 1974, she gave birth to twin brothers Julián and Joaquin, conceived during her relationship with Jessie Guzman, who was a mathematics teacher and political activist. Never married, the couple separated when the brothers were eight years old.

Castro continues to be involved in community and national organizations such as Latinas Represent, the Texas Organizing Project, and AARP.

In 2015, she was elected to the San Antonio Women’s Hall of Fame, and in 2017 she was awarded an honorary Ph.D. from Our Lady of the Lake University.

Castro is also a published poet, contributing four pieces to the anthology, Entre Guadalupe y Malinche: Tejanas in Literature and Art, published by the University of Texas Press in 2016.

Both Joaquin Castro and Julian Castro have cited Rosie's activism as the foundation for their political careers. Julian noted in his keynote address that "my mother fought hard for civil rights so that instead of a mop, I could hold this microphone."

In a later interview with Texas Monthly, Julian also noted “Maria del Rosario Castro has never held a political office ... However, today, years later, I read the newspapers, and I see that more Valdezes are sitting on school boards, that a greater number of Garcias are now doctors, lawyers, engineers, and of course, teachers.”
