= 2005 San Antonio mayoral election =

- May 7, 2005 (first round); June 7, 2005 (runoff)
- Turnout: 17.73% (first round); 18.82% (runoff)

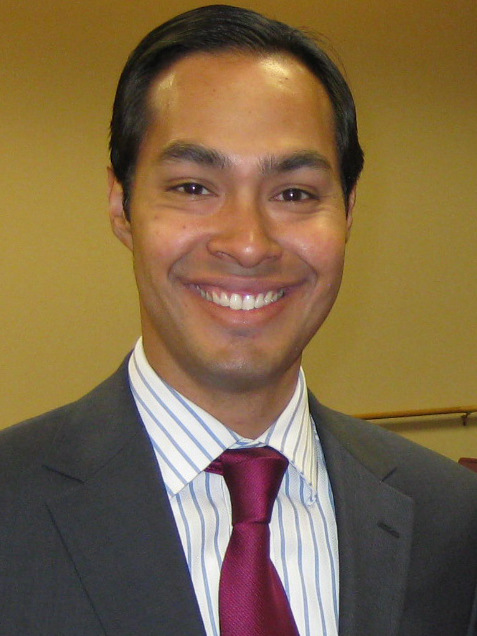
Candidate	Phil Hardberger	Julian Castro	Carroll Schubert
First round	34,280; 30.05%	47,893; 41.99%	30,029; 26.32%
Runoff	66,830; 51.47%	63,001; 48.53%	Eliminated
Mayor before election
Ed Garza
Elected mayor
Phil Hardberger

On May 7 and June 7, 2005, the city of San Antonio, Texas held an election to choose who would serve as Mayor of San Antonio for a two-year term to expire in 2007. Phil Hardberger won in a runoff against Julian Castro. The election was officially nonpartisan.

== Polling ==
=== Primary election ===
Poll source	Date(s) administered	Sample size (Note: Key: A – all adults RV – registered voters LV – likely voters V – unclear)	Margin of error	Phil Hardberger	Julian Castro	Carroll Shubert	Other	Undecided
SurveyUSA	May 3–5, 2005	499 (LV)	± 4.5%	26%	46%	24%	2%	2%

=== General election ===
Poll source	Date(s) administered	Sample size	Margin of error	Phil Hardberger	Julian Castro	Other / Undecided
SurveyUSA	June 3–5, 2005	632 (LV)	± 4.0%	52%	47%	1%

== Results ==
Candidates	General Election		Run-off Election	
	Votes	%	Votes	%
Phil Hardberger	34,280	30.05	66,830	51.47
Julian Castro	47,893	41.99	63,001	48.53
Carroll Schubert	30,029	26.32		
Julie Iris Oldham	919	0.81		
Everett Caldwell	391	0.34		
Rhett R. Smith	289	0.25		
Michael Idrogo	270	0.24		
Total	115,194	100	129,991	100
