= Julian Castro =

American politician (born 1974)

Julián Castro
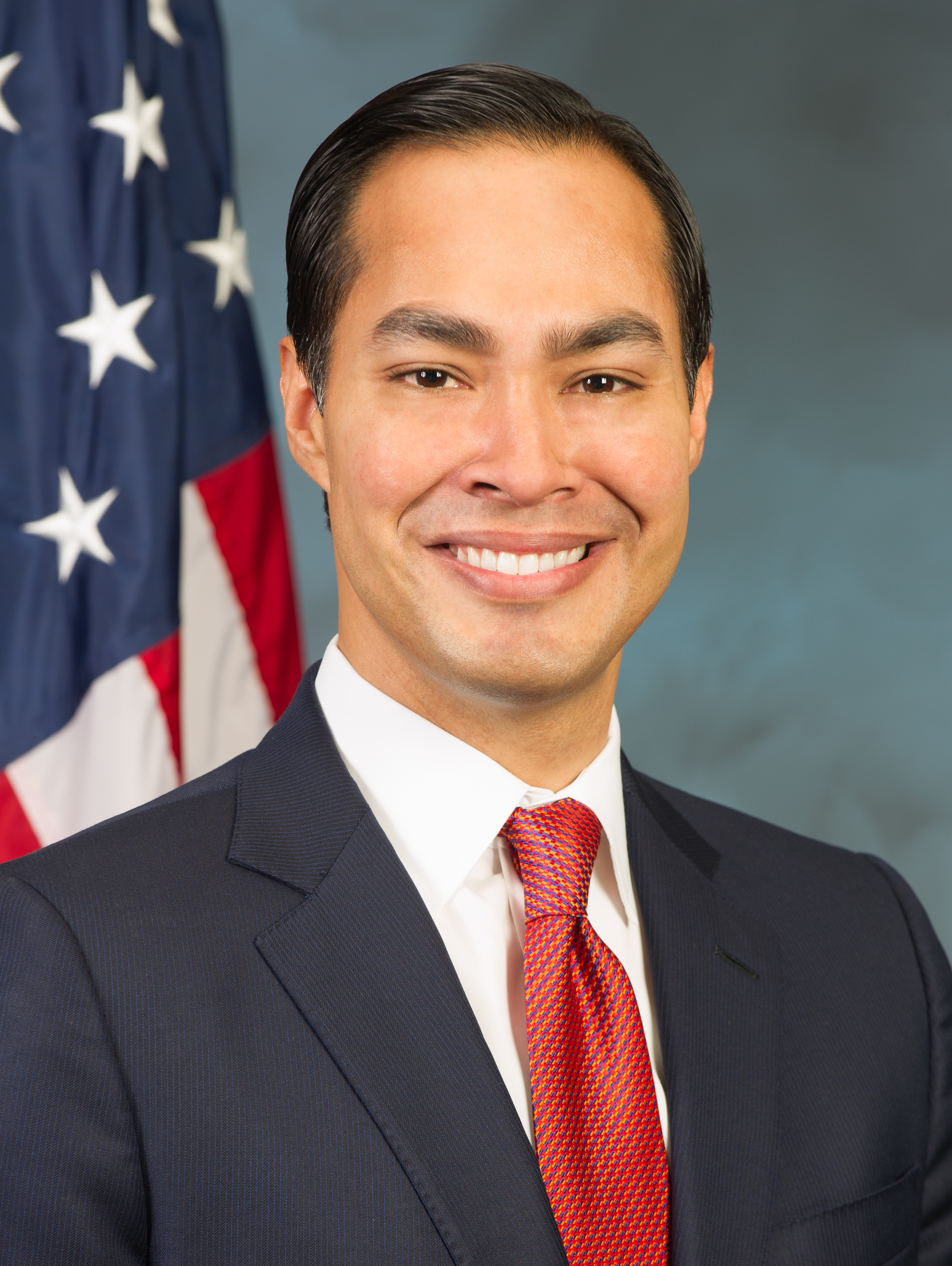
- Official portrait, 2016

16th United States Secretary of Housing and Urban Development
- In office July 28, 2014 – January 20, 2017
- President: Barack Obama
- Deputy: Nani A. Coloretti
- Preceded by: Shaun Donovan
- Succeeded by: Ben Carson

181st Mayor of San Antonio
- In office June 1, 2009 – July 22, 2014
- Preceded by: Phil Hardberger
- Succeeded by: Ivy Taylor

Member of the San Antonio City Council from the 7th district
- In office July 1, 2001 – July 1, 2005
- Preceded by: Ed Garza
- Succeeded by: Elena Guajardo

Personal details
- Born: September 16, 1974 (age 52) San Antonio, Texas, U.S.
- Party: Democratic
- Spouse: Erica Lira (m. 2007; div. 2022)
- Children: 2
- Relatives: Joaquin Castro (twin brother); Rosie Castro (mother)
- Education: Stanford University (BA); Harvard University (JD)
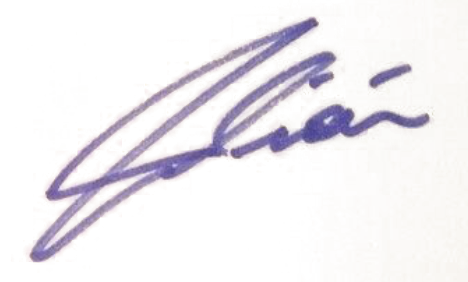
- Signature
- Castro's voice Castro testifying on the FY2015 HUD budget at a House Appropriations subcommittee. Recorded March 1, 2016

Julián Castro (/ˌhuːliˈɑːn/ HOO-lee-AHN, Spanish: [xuˈljan]; born September 16, 1974) is an American lawyer and politician. A member of the Democratic Party, he was the youngest member of President Obama's cabinet, serving as the 16th United States secretary of housing and urban development from 2014 to 2017. Castro served as the mayor of his native San Antonio, Texas from 2009 until he joined Barack Obama's cabinet in 2014.

Castro was mentioned as a possible running mate for Hillary Clinton during the 2016 presidential campaign. He is the twin brother of Congressman Joaquin Castro. On January 12, 2019, Castro launched his campaign for the Democratic nomination for President of the United States in 2020 in San Antonio. He dropped out of the presidential race on January 2, 2020, endorsing the candidacy of Elizabeth Warren soon after.

== Early life and family ==
Castro was born in San Antonio, Texas, the son of Maria "Rosie" Castro and Jessie Guzman. He is the identical twin brother of current United States Representative Joaquin Castro; Julián was born a minute before Joaquin; they were born at 2:40 and 2:41 am, respectively.

Castro is of Mexican descent. His mother is a Chicana political activist who helped establish the Chicano political party La Raza Unida, and who ran for the San Antonio City Council in 1971. Castro once stated, "My mother is probably the biggest reason that my brother and I are in public service. Growing up, she would take us to a lot of rallies and organizational meetings and other things that are very boring for an 8-, 9-, 10-year-old". His father, Jessie Guzman, is a retired mathematics teacher and political activist. Never married, Rosie and Jessie separated when Castro and his brother were eight years old. Castro's Texan roots trace back to 1920, when his grandmother Victoria Castro joined extended family members there as a six-year-old orphan from northern Mexico.

== Education ==
Castro attended Thomas Jefferson High School in San Antonio, where he played football, basketball and tennis; he also collected trading cards. He skipped his sophomore year and graduated in 1992, ranking ninth in his class. He had received an offer to play tennis at Trinity University, an NCAA Division III school in his hometown, but chose to attend Stanford University, along with his twin brother Joaquin.

Castro graduated from Stanford in 1996 with a bachelor's degree in political science and communications. He said he began thinking about entering politics while at Stanford, where he and his brother launched their first campaigns and won student senate seats, tying for the highest number of votes. Castro has credited affirmative action for his admission into Stanford, telling The New York Times, "Joaquin and I got into Stanford because of affirmative action. I scored 1210 on my SATs, which was lower than the median matriculating student. But I did fine in college and in law school. So did Joaquin. I'm a strong supporter of affirmative action because I've seen it work in my own life". Between his sophomore and junior years, Castro worked as an intern at the White House during the presidency of Bill Clinton.

Castro entered Harvard Law School in 1997 and graduated with a Juris Doctor in 2000 along with his twin brother. After law school, the two brothers worked for the law firm Akin Gump Strauss Hauer & Feld before starting their own firm in 2005.

In 2018, Castro was named as the Dean's Distinguished Fellow and Fellow of the Dávila Chair in International Trade Policy at the Lyndon B. Johnson School of Public Affairs.

== San Antonio city council ==
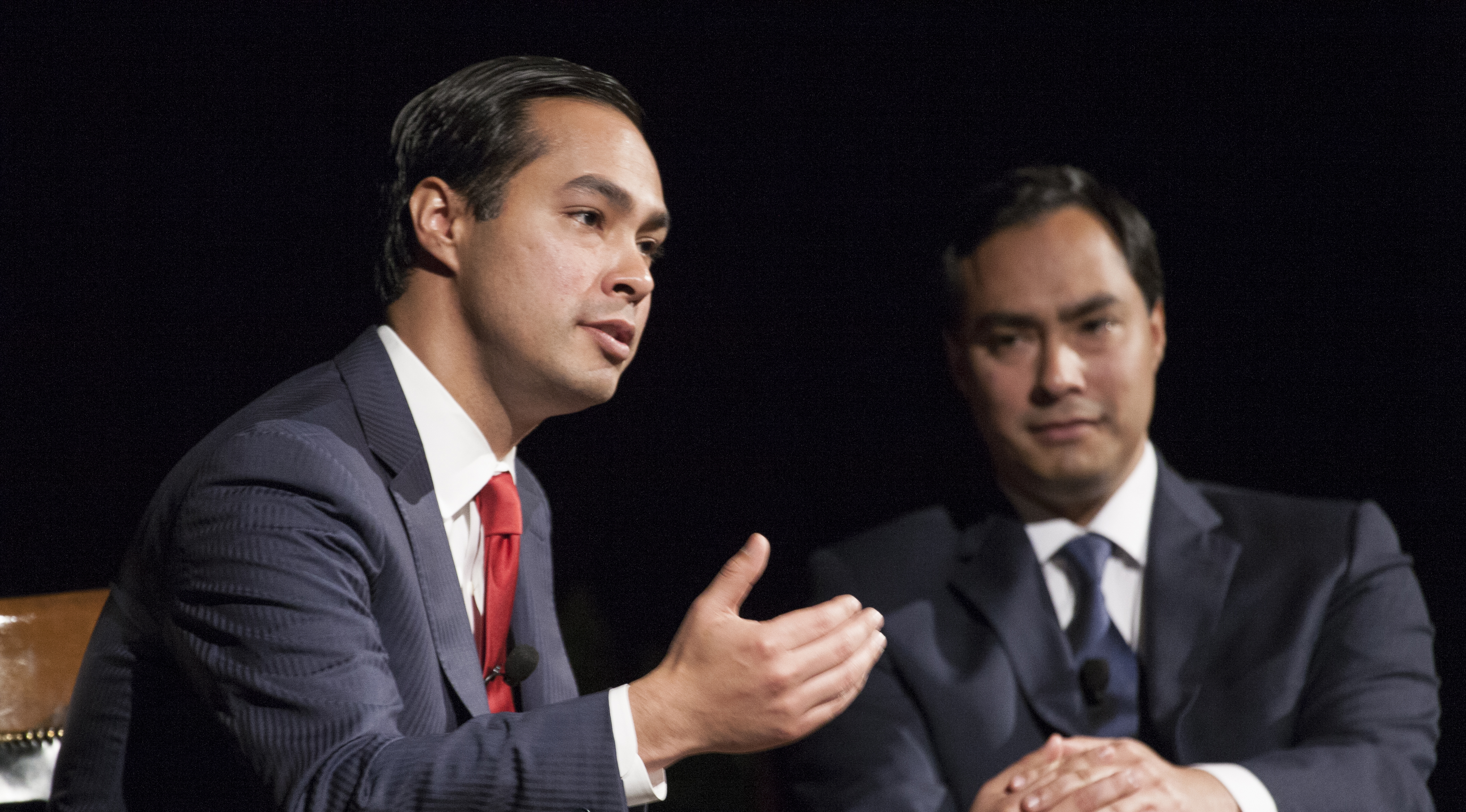
Julian Castro and his twin brother, Representative Joaquin Castro, at the LBJ Presidential Library.

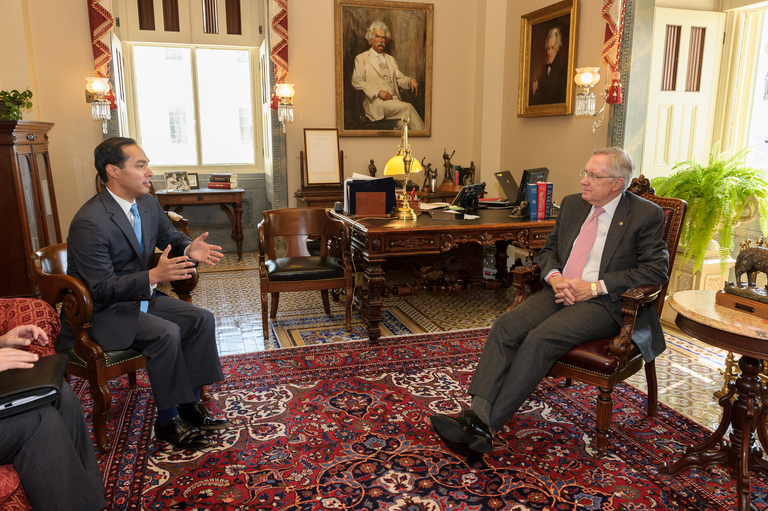
Castro meets with U.S. Senate Majority Leader Harry Reid on July 7, 2014

In 2001, Castro was elected to the San Antonio City Council, winning 61 percent of the vote against five challengers. At age 26 he was the youngest city councilman in San Antonio history, surpassing Henry Cisneros, who won his council seat in 1975 at age 27. Castro represented District 7, a precinct on the city's west side with 115,000 residents. The population was 70 percent Hispanic and included a large number of senior citizens. As a councilman from 2001 to 2005, he opposed a PGA-approved golf course and large-scale real estate development on the city's outer rim.

== Mayor of San Antonio ==
Castro ran for mayor of San Antonio in 2005 and was widely viewed as the front runner in a field that also included retired judge Phil Hardberger and conservative city councilman Carroll Schubert. He was defeated by approximately 4000 votes when Hardberger received 51.5% of the votes in the runoff. Following his election defeat, Castro established his own law practice.

Castro ran for mayor of San Antonio again in 2009. Castro hired Christian Archer, who had run Hardberger's campaign in 2005, to run his own 2009 campaign. Castro won the election on May 9, 2009, with 56.23% of the vote, his closest opponent being Trish DeBerry-Mejia. He became the fifth Latino mayor in the history of San Antonio. He was the youngest mayor of a top-50 American city. Castro easily won re-election in 2011 and 2013, receiving 82.9% of the vote in 2011 and 67% of the vote in 2013.

In 2010, Castro created SA2020, a community-wide visioning effort. It generated a list of goals created by the people of San Antonio based on their collective vision for San Antonio in the year 2020. SA2020 then became a nonprofit organization tasked with turning that vision into a reality. Castro also established Cafe College in 2010, offering college guidance to San Antonio-area students. In 2012 he led a voter referendum to expand pre-kindergarten education. Castro persuaded two of the most prominent businessmen in San Antonio, Charles Butt and Joe Robles, to lead an effort to pass a $30 million sales tax to fund the pre-kindergarten education program.

In March 2010, Castro was named to the World Economic Forum's list of Young Global Leaders. Later that year, Time magazine placed him on its "40 under 40" list of rising stars in American politics.

Castro gained national attention in 2012 when he was the first Hispanic to deliver the keynote address at a Democratic National Convention in Charlotte, North Carolina. Following the 2012 elections, Castro declined the position of United States Secretary of Transportation, partly with an eye on running for governor of Texas after 2017. However, in 2014, Castro accepted President Barack Obama's offer of the position of United States Secretary of Housing and Urban Development. Castro resigned as mayor effective July 22, 2014, so that he could take up his duties in Washington. The San Antonio City Council elected councilmember Ivy Taylor to replace him.

== Secretary of Housing and Urban Development (2014–2017) ==
=== Nomination and confirmation ===
On May 22, 2014, the White House announced Castro as the nominee to be the next secretary of Housing and Urban Development (HUD) by President Barack Obama. He was confirmed by the Senate on July 9, 2014, by a vote of 71-26 and replaced Shaun Donovan, who was nominated to be the Director of the Office of Management and Budget. He took office on July 28, 2014. Following the announcement, Castro was discussed as a potential nominee for vice president for the Democratic Party in the 2016 presidential election.

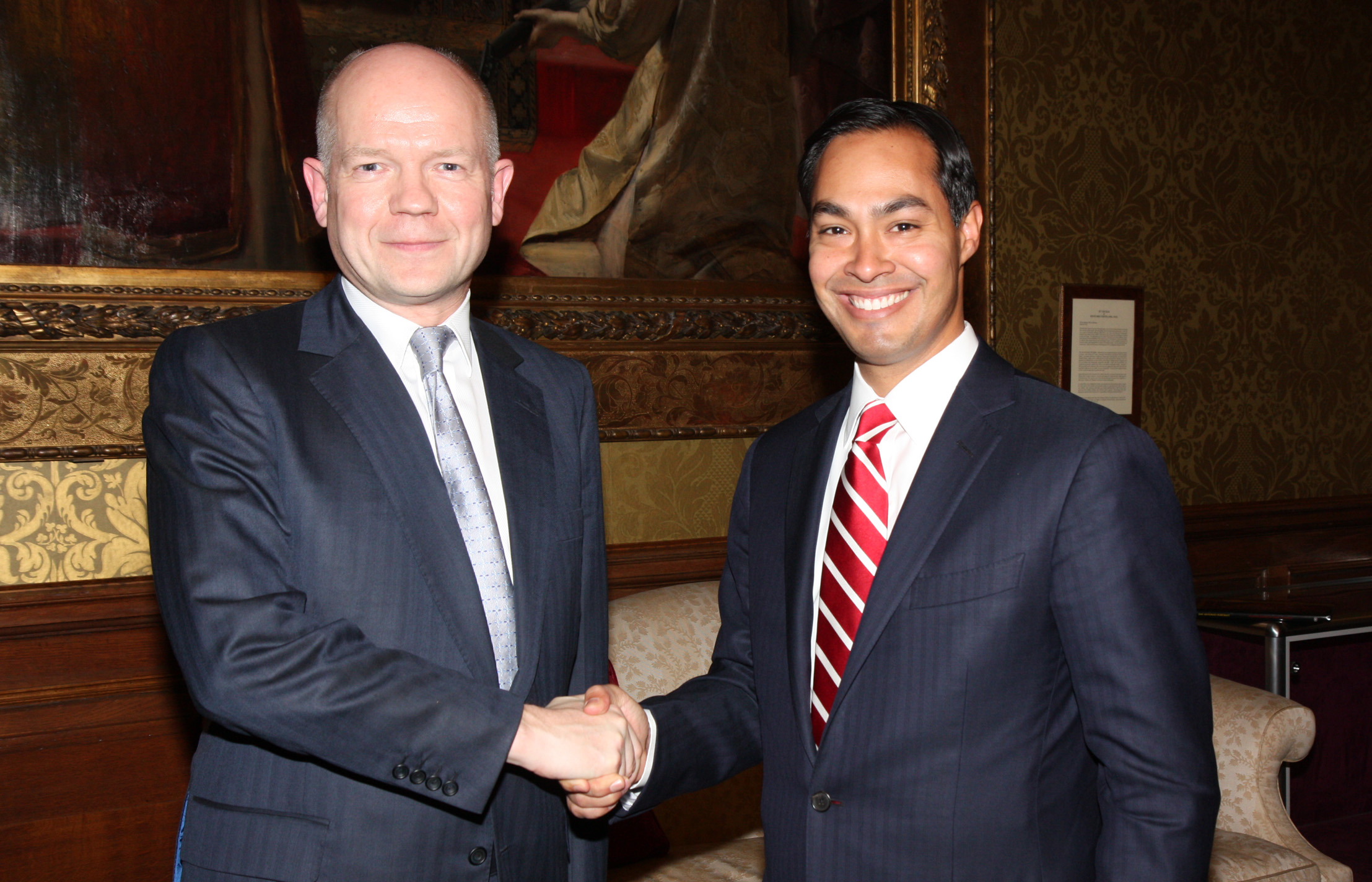
British Secretary of State for Foreign and Commonwealth Affairs William Hague meeting Castro in London in 2012

On July 28, 2014, his first day in office, Castro was honored at a reception called "Celebrating Latino Cabinet Members" hosted by the Congressional Hispanic Caucus Institute.

Upon exiting office in 2017, Castro's final memo outlined various accomplishments of the department under his leadership. These areas included HUD's work to stabilize the housing market, rebuild communities struck by natural disasters through a $1 billion National Disaster Resilience Competition, expansion of lead safety protections in federally assisted housing, and the Affirmatively Furthering Fair Housing rule to "finally fulfill the full obligation of the Fair Housing Act.

=== 2016 presidential election ===
On October 15, 2015, Castro endorsed Hillary Clinton for president. When Clinton was asked if Castro could be her pick for vice president, she said, "I am going to look really hard at him for anything because that's how good he is." Discussion of Castro as a candidate to run on the Democratic ticket with Hillary Clinton increased markedly in January 2016, as the Iowa and New Hampshire primaries approached. In late January, Castro began to campaign for Clinton in Iowa, a move interpreted as a test of his appeal to the electorate. In July 2016, the U.S. Office of Special Counsel issued a finding that Castro had violated the Hatch Act by commenting on the 2016 campaign while giving an interview in an official capacity; Castro admitted the error and ordered his team to improve training on the Hatch Act.

== Memoir ==
In October 2018, Castro published his memoir, An Unlikely Journey: Waking Up from My American Dream through Little, Brown and Company.

== 2020 presidential campaign ==
Julian Castro
- Campaign: 2020 United States presidential election (Democratic primaries)
- Candidate: Julián Castro; 16th United States Secretary of Housing and Urban Development (2014–2017); Mayor of San Antonio, Texas (2009–2014)
- Affiliation: Democratic Party
- Announced: January 12, 2019
- Suspended: January 2, 2020
- Headquarters: San Antonio, Texas
- Key people: Rep. Joaquin Castro (campaign chairman); Maya Rupert (campaign manager); Derek Eadon (deputy campaign manager); Jennifer Fiore (communications advisor); Scott Atlas (finance chairman)
- Receipts: US$10,264,312.76 (12/31/2019)
- Slogan: One Nation. One Destiny.

Website
- julianforthefuture.com/ (archived - December 24, 2019)

In 2018, Castro visited the first in the nation New Hampshire primary state, and delivered the commencement address at New England College in Henniker, New Hampshire, on May 12, 2018. Castro stated that he would make his decision on whether to run in 2020 after the November 2018 mid-term elections. On December 12, 2018, Castro announced the formation of an exploratory committee. The next day, during an episode of The Late Show with Stephen Colbert, Julián's brother Joaquin (during a joint appearance by both brothers) stated that he confidently believed that Julián will be running for president.

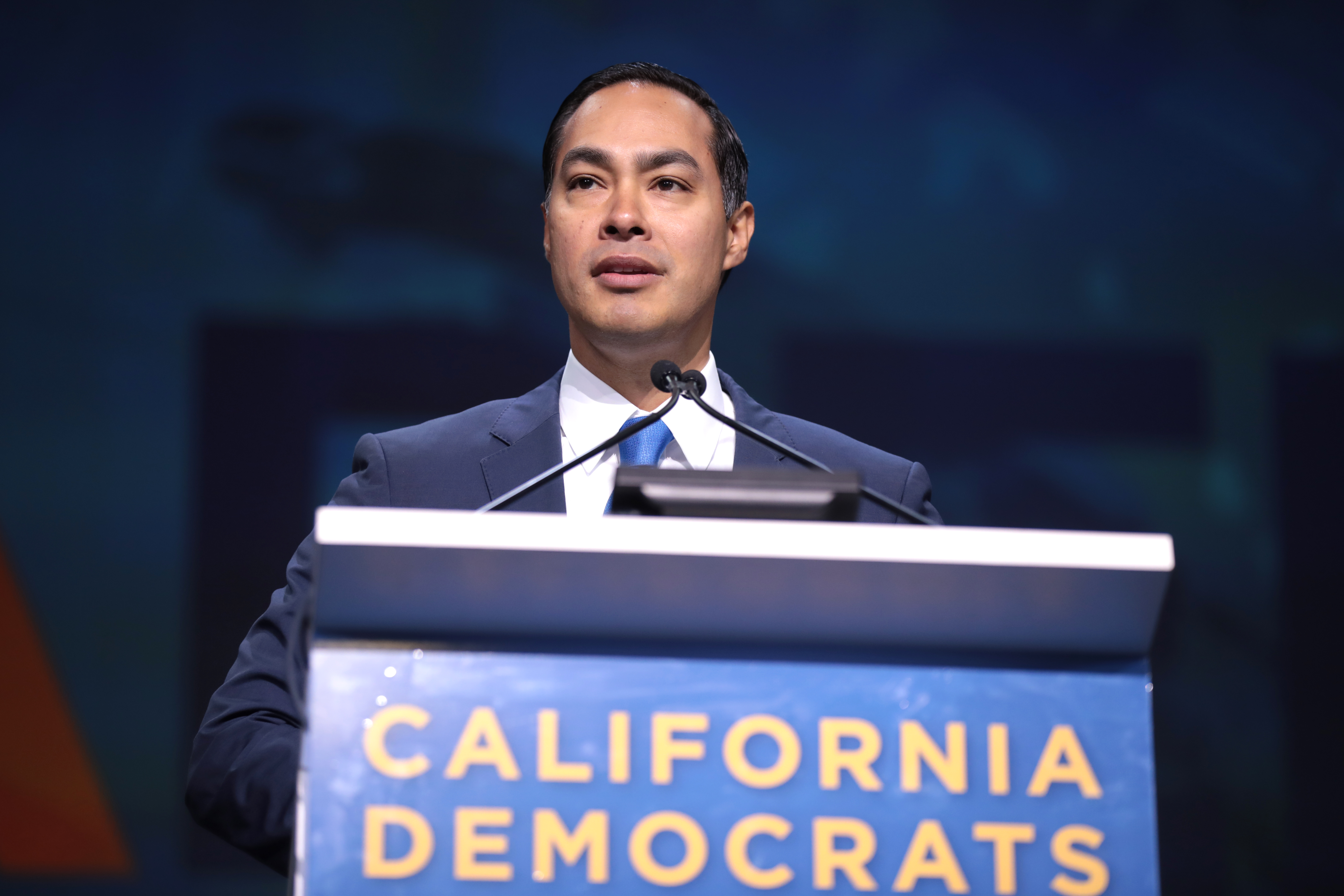
Castro speaking to the California Democratic Party State Convention in June 2019.

Castro formally announced his candidacy for the 2020 presidential election on January 12, 2019, at a rally in San Antonio, TX. His brother, Congressman Joaquín Castro, and their mother introduced him at the rally. Castro would have been the first Democratic presidential nominee since 1924 to not have first served as vice president, governor or senator, and the first Hispanic or Latino nominee for president. He was the first Texan in the 2020 race and would have been the third-youngest president if elected. In his announcement, Castro emphasized Medicare-For-All, universal pre-K, and a pathway to citizenship for undocumented immigrants as part of comprehensive immigration reform. In 2019, he purchased a Fox News ad in order to speak directly to Donald Trump about the El Paso shooting. Despite referring to his healthcare plan as Medicare for All, his position was actually a public option rather than the single-payer plan proposed by Bernie Sanders and Pramila Jayapal.

Castro's performance in the second night of the first debate was praised, with many pundits considering him to have been the "breakout star" of the night, and to have been one of the "winners" of the debate.

During the third Democratic presidential debate, Castro was accused of ageism after he attacked Joe Biden in a heated exchange over health care plans with Castro taunting Biden saying "Are you forgetting what you just said two minutes ago", repeating it multiple times. Castro was rebuked for his remarks by various members of the candidates on stage including, Andrew Yang, Amy Klobuchar, and Pete Buttigieg. Castro was widely criticized for what was seen as a "low blow", and with many accusing Castro of "bullying", and engaging in "ageism". Journalist Gayle King saw the interaction as a "personal attack". On The Late Show with Stephen Colbert, Stephen Colbert described the interaction as both "mean and inaccurate", since Castro was factually incorrect in his attack against Biden according to Politifact.

Many remarked that the exchange was the beginning of the end of Castro's presidential campaign. Castro has defended his attack against Biden saying he "wouldn't do it differently" and insisted he wasn't making fun of Biden."

Castro suspended his presidential campaign on January 2, 2020. "¡Ganaremos un día!" he said in Spanish, which translates to "One day we'll win!"

On January 6, 2020, Castro endorsed Elizabeth Warren.

== Post-presidential campaign ==
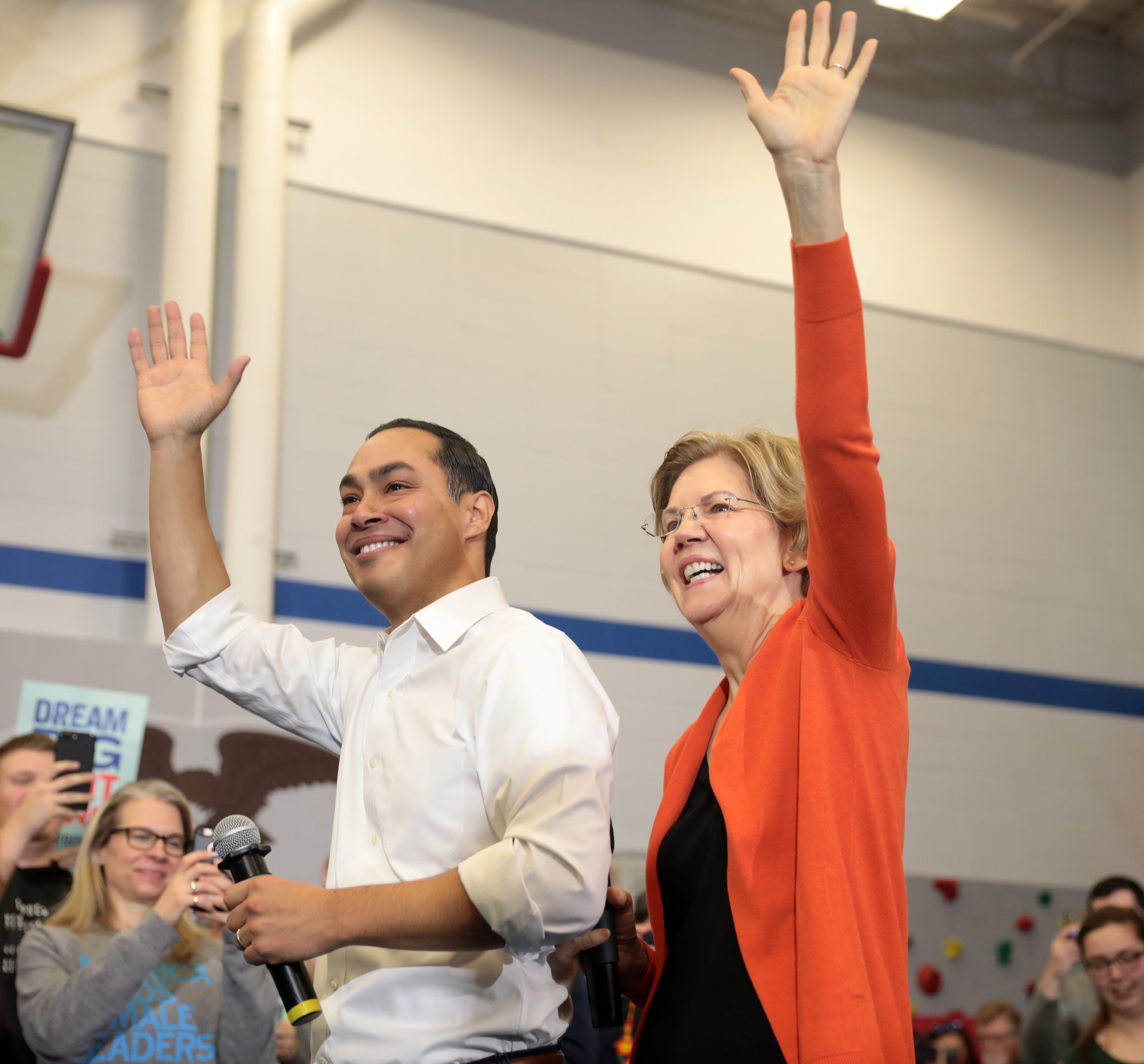
Castro campaigns alongside Elizabeth Warren for her presidential campaign in Marshalltown, Iowa on January 2, 2020

On January 6, 2020, Castro endorsed Senator Elizabeth Warren for president. The next day, he gave a speech formally supporting Warren during her campaign rally in Brooklyn, New York. Castro was a "partner" in Warren's presidential campaign, and was considered by the media to be a potential running mate for Warren, but she failed to win Texas. On June 2, 2020, he endorsed presumptive Democratic nominee Joe Biden.

In September 2020, Castro partnered with Lemonada Media to launch Our America with Julián Castro, a weekly podcast discussing America's past and possibilities.

In October 2020, Castro joined the board of directors of the Center for American Progress, a center-left think tank founded by John Podesta.

On July 12, 2021, Castro joined NBC News and MSNBC as a political commentator.

In July 2024, Castro called for Joe Biden to withdraw from the 2024 United States presidential election.

== Political positions ==
=== Economy ===
Castro "believes in balanced budgets". He also supports increasing the federal minimum wage to $15 an hour.

==== Trade ====
Castro is a supporter of national and international trade regulation. He has been a strong supporter of the North American Free Trade Agreement while serving as mayor of San Antonio, but has also said that the agreement should be renegotiated to "strengthen worker and environmental protections".

=== Education ===
Castro supports universal pre-kindergarten, and managed to institute a pre-kindergarten program for 4-year-olds, funded by higher local taxes, while serving as mayor of San Antonio. He also supports making the first two years of higher education tuition-free.

=== Healthcare ===
Castro has called for universal health care and indicated he would consider funding such a program by raising taxes on corporations and the wealthy. He has supported the Affordable Care Act. His campaign's healthcare plan calls for a public option.

=== Environment ===
Castro supports the Paris climate accord, and has criticized President Trump's withdrawal from the agreement. While in office, Castro worked with companies to promote their transition to renewable energy. He has voiced support for a Green New Deal.

In the past, Castro has advocated for an "energy policy that includes fossil fuels" while also "pointing out the benefits of fossil fuel jobs".

=== Animal welfare ===
As a 2020 presidential candidate, Castro published an animal welfare plan that called for ending euthanasia of healthy dogs and cats in animal shelters, strengthening enforcement of the Endangered Species Act, prohibiting testing cosmetics on animals, and establishing minimum space requirements for animals confined in intensive battery cages and gestation crates.

In 2019, Castro told Iowa Citizens for Community Improvement that he supports a ban on the construction and expansion of concentrated animal feeding operations, sometimes referred to as factory farms.

=== Foreign policy ===
==== Syria ====
Castro has endorsed a gradual withdrawal of U.S. troops from Syria while also criticizing Trump's approach to the issue.

==== China ====
Castro voiced support for Hong Kong protesters. He wrote that "The United States must lead with our values and speak out for pro-democracy protestors in Hong Kong, and not allow American citizens to be bullied by an authoritarian government."

=== Campaign finance ===
Castro has stated that he is "not going to take any PAC money" as a presidential candidate, and has encouraged others to do the same. He had however formed a PAC (Opportunity First) in 2017 which mostly covered his running expenses while also donating to several dozen "young, progressive" Democratic politicians.

=== Social issues and civil rights ===
==== Abortion ====
Castro is pro-choice, and has "vigorously" opposed state laws limiting abortion access after the 20th week of pregnancy and other restrictions.

==== LGBTQ rights ====
Castro has been an advocate for LGBTQ rights and, as mayor, opposed the law in Texas (later overturned by the U.S. Supreme Court) that denied legal recognition to same-sex marriages. He is also a member of Washington D.C.–based think tank the Inter-American Dialogue. Castro was the first San Antonio mayor to serve as the grand marshal of the city's Pride Parade in 2009 and in 2011 led a push to offer domestic partner benefits in the city. In 2012, he joined mayors across the country in signing the "Mayors for the Freedom to Marry" petition for same-sex marriage equality.

Castro said in a tweet that transgender people should be allowed to serve in the armed forces.

In his remarks during the first round of 2019 Democratic presidential debates, Castro pledged to make abortions available to trans men, mistakenly referring to them as trans women. He later rectified himself to include all trans and non-binary people after having been corrected on Twitter.

In an interview with Mara Keisling of TransEquality, Julian Castro decried the treatment of trans people as second-class citizens.

==== Gun rights ====
Castro supports tighter gun control and has supported the reinstatement of the assault weapons ban, limiting access to high-capacity magazines, and closing the gun show loophole.

==== Affirmative action ====
Castro has backed affirmative action.

==== Immigration ====
Castro supports a path to citizenship for most undocumented residents of the US, has opposed President Trump's "border wall" plan, and has said that the U.S. Immigration and Customs Enforcement agency needs to be "reconstituted" and that illegal immigration should be treated as a civil offense instead of a criminal one. Additionally, he asserted in the first Democratic primary candidate debates on June 26, 2019 that he would repeal Section 1325 of Title 8 of the U.S. criminal code, which would decriminalize illegal entry into the U.S., rendering unlawful entry a civil offense instead of a criminal one.

== Personal life ==
In 2007, Castro married Erica Lira, an elementary school teacher. They divorced in 2022. They have a daughter who was born in March 2009, and a son born in December 2014.

Castro is Catholic. He is not a native Spanish speaker, but he began learning the language in 2010 while serving as mayor of San Antonio. He also studied Latin and Japanese in school.

Political offices
Preceded by Phil Hardberger	Mayor of San Antonio; 2009–2014	Succeeded by Ivy Taylor
Preceded by Shaun Donovan	United States Secretary of Housing and Urban Development; 2014–2017	Succeeded by Ben Carson
Party political offices
Preceded by Mark Warner	Keynote Speaker of the Democratic National Convention; 2012	Succeeded by Elizabeth Warren
U.S. order of precedence (ceremonial)
Preceded by Sylvia Mathews Burwell as Former U.S. Cabinet Member	Order of precedence of the United States as Former U.S. Cabinet Member	Succeeded by Bob McDonald as Former U.S. Cabinet Member
