= Dilley Immigration Processing Center =

Immigrant detention center in Dilley, Texas, US

South Texas Family Residential Center
- Interactive map of South Texas Family Residential Center
- Location: 300 El Rancho Way Dilley, Frio County, Texas, United States, 78017; 28.656400°N 99.202272°W
- Status: Reopened 2025
- Security class: Immigration detention facility
- Capacity: 2,400
- Opened: 2014
- Managed by: CoreCivic (formerly known as CCA - Corrections Corporation of America)
- Director: Jose Rodriguez Jr.
- Website: https://www.corecivic.com/facilities/dilley-immigration-processing-center

The South Texas Family Residential Center (also called Dilley Immigration Processing Center) is an immigrant detention center in Dilley, Texas. First opened in December 2014, under Barack Obama, it has a capacity of 2,400 and is intended to detain mainly women and children from Central America. United States Immigration and Customs Enforcement (ICE) closed the detention center in June 2024, citing cost savings to add more beds in other facilities as the Biden administration implemented new border restrictions. It reopened the following year, in 2025.

In 2025, CoreCivic announced a new contract with ICE to reopen the facility as the Dilley Immigration Processing Center. ICE awarded the CoreCivic and Target Hospitality a 5-year contract in 2025, aiming to immediately resume operations. CoreCivic receives $160 million annually to operate the facility. As of 2025, the facility was exceeded in total capacity and average daily population by some other detention centers, including Camp East Montana.

A 2025 ICE planning document described the possible construction of a 250-person "soft-sided" detention center at the site.

== Location and description ==
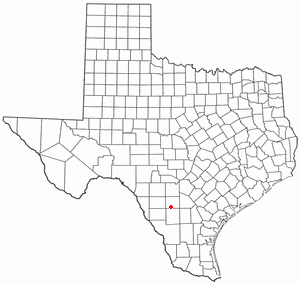
Approximate location in Texas

The site is located approximately 100 miles (160 km) north of the Rio Grande and 70 miles (110 km) southwest of San Antonio, southwest of Dilley, Texas, in Frio County. The address is 300 El Rancho Way, Dilley, Texas, United States, zip code 78017.

The 50-acre site (20 ha) contains 80 small, tan-colored, two-bedroom, one-bathroom cottages for the families. The cottages can house up to eight people and contain bunk beds as well as baby cribs. They also have a flat-screen television. There is a kitchen, but cooking is not allowed in order to prevent fires. The cottages are connected by dirt roads.

There are also recreational and medical facilities, a school, trailer classrooms, a library, a basketball court, playgrounds, and email access. A cafeteria is open for 12 hours a day, but snacks can be obtained at any hour.

The site was formerly a camp used by oilfield workers.

== Detainees ==
The South Texas Family Residential Center was at first only able to accommodate 480 people when the first group of residents arrive in December 2014 from a Border Patrol training camp located in Artesia, New Mexico. Capacity expanded over the following months as construction and staffing continued, reaching up to 2,400 residents by mid-2015, with a staff of around 600. It is intended to detain mostly women and children from Central America.

On June 12, 2015, it was reported that the facility was holding 1,735 people, approximately 1,000 of whom were children. CoreCivic, previously called "Corrections Corporation of America," sought a license in 2016 to operate the facility as a General Residential Operation but litigation was brought by Texas RioGrande Legal Aid on behalf of Grassroots Leadership and the detainees themselves to block the licensing by the Texas Department of Family and Protective Services. In filings dated September 30, 2018, the operator stated that the property was 100% full. By April 2019, there were 499 women and children in the facility.

In January 2026, a five-year-old Liam Conejo Ramos and his father were brought to the facility. The child's detention had attracted media attention and public outrage after photos of the child being detained in a bunny hat and Spider-man backpack circulated. On January 24, dozens of detained children staged a demonstration in the detention center, shouting "Libertad" (Spanish for "Freedom").

Conejo Ramos's detention brought widespread public attention to the unsanitary conditions of the facility. His health deteriorated quickly due to a lack of medical care and unsafe food and water. A judge ordered his release along with his father, and the same weekend that they were released, ICE locked down the facility and announced that cases of measles were spreading there.

== Administration ==
The facility opened in 2014 and is operated mainly by CoreCivic and Target Hospitality. The facility was shut down in June 2024.

== Public reactions ==
At the end of January 2026, several protests broke out around the facilities following reports of mistreatment of immigrants after reports from Eric Lee's attorney investigating ICE procedures, citing sounds of children crying and screaming after being detained.

On January 28, 2026, DPS troopers arrived to control part of the protests around the camp, where agents used tear gas on several demonstrators who were protesting ICE's detention of children. DPS agents had arrested two protesters who had approached the facilities.

On February 9, 2026, ProPublica released a detailed investigation into the treatment of children at the South Texas Family Residential Center, where several letters in English and Spanish from immigrant children detailing their experience at the center were disclosed. The disclosure of letters from immigrant children caused outrage both in Texas and in various parts of Latin America following the mistreatment allegedly suffered by children of Colombian and Venezuelan origin. After the letters and artwork created by detained children spread among the public, guards at the camp seized drawing supplies, letters and drawings, and restricted access to email.

In July 2026, 110 Democratic members of Congress, sent a letter calling for the facility to be shut down.

In July 2026, plaintiffs filed a brief in the District Court for the Central District of California against attorney general Todd Blanche alleging that guards routinely abuse, neglect, and torment children at the facility. The brief detailed testimonies of guards physically attacking children, denying children medical care, using racist language, entering showers while teenage girls were naked, and startling them awake during the night.

=== Protests ===
The detention of Liam Conejo Ramos, a 5-year-old U.S. citizen taken into custody with his father after an immigration enforcement operation in Columbia Heights, Minnesota, and subsequently held at the Dilley facility, drew national attention in January 2026. When news of Liam's detention reached families inside Dilley, detained women and children staged a demonstration, chanting for release and holding signs. Outside the facility, protesters gathered and state police used pepper spray on demonstrators.

U.S. Representative Joaquin Castro visited the facility on January 29, 2026, spending two-and-a-half hours inside and meeting with detained families, including Liam and his father. Castro described the approximately 1,100 detainees he observed, including a 2-month-old infant, as "literally being treated as prisoners." Several other children from the Columbia Heights school district were also taken to Dilley, and school officials reported that two brothers detained with their mother recognized a classmate in the facility cafeteria who had been missing from their school for weeks.

Immigration attorney Eric Lee, who represents the family of Hayam El-Gamal, an Egyptian mother detained with her five children (including 5-year-old twins) for eight months at Dilley, described conditions as "an unmitigated horror show." Lee reported that one of El-Gamal's children suffered appendicitis in detention and "was left writhing on the floor of the facility screaming and in pain" before eventually being taken to urgent care.

== See also ==
- Willacy County Correctional Center – Former prison in Texas, United States
- Children in immigration detention in the United States
- Detention of Liam Conejo Ramos
- Flores Settlement Agreement
- Trump administration family separation policy
