= Ray Lopez =

American politician

Member of the Texas House of Representatives from the 125th district
- Incumbent
- Assumed office March 21, 2019
- Preceded by: Justin Rodriguez
- Succeeded by: Adrian Reyna (elect)

Member of the San Antonio City Council from the 6th district
- In office 2004–2012

Personal details
- Born: Reynaldo Trevino Lopez; December 5, 1949 (age 76)
- Party: Democratic
- Spouse: Evelyn (m. 1971)
- Children: 4

Military service
- Branch/service: United States Army

Reynaldo Trevino Lopez (born December 5, 1949) is an American politician serving as a member of the Texas House of Representatives from the 125th district. Lopez was elected in 2018 and assumed office on March 21, 2019. Lopez had previously served for four terms as a member of the San Antonio City Council.

== Early life ==
Lopez was raised in Charlotte, Texas. After graduating from Harlandale High School, he enlisted in the United States Army.

== Career ==
Lopez served in the United States Army Reserve for 14 years, retiring with the rank of staff sergeant. He later worked as an executive at AT&T, where he managed a team of technology employees. In 2004, he was elected to the San Antonio City Council for the sixth district. Lopez had previously served on the board of the Northside Independent School District.

== Personal life ==
Lopez married his wife, Evelyn, in 1971. They have four children.
