= Justin Rodriguez =

American politician (born 1974)

Bexar County Commissioner, Precinct 2
- Incumbent
- Assumed office January 4, 2019
- Preceded by: Paul Elizondo

Member of the Texas House of Representatives from the 125th district
- In office January 8, 2013 – January 4, 2019
- Preceded by: Joaquin Castro
- Succeeded by: Ray Lopez

Personal details
- Born: September 4, 1974 (age 52) San Antonio, Texas
- Party: Democratic
- Spouse: Victoria
- Education: University of the Incarnate Word; University of Wisconsin Law School
- Occupation: Attorney

Justin Rodriguez (September 4, 1974) is an American politician and current Commissioner of Bexar County, Texas. He represents 509,000 county residents in 134 square miles. The district radiates north and west to the unincorporated areas of the city and includes communities within San Antonio, Balcones Heights, Helotes, and Leon Valley.

He previously served as a Democratic member of the Texas House of Representatives from 2013 until January 2019. He resigned his house seat after county judge Nelson Wolff appointed him to a seat on the Bexar County Commissioners Court. Rodriguez previously served on the San Antonio City Council, and was a Bexar County prosecutor.

In the race to succeed Representative Rodriguez, Fred Rangel, a member of the Republican State Central Committee for District 26 in the Texas State Senate, and Democrat Ray Lopez, a former member of the San Antonio City Council, met in a March runoff contest. Rangel led Lopez in the February 12 initial balloting as he was the only major Republican, but Lopez won the runoff by consolidating Democratic voters in the heavily Democratic district.
