= Berks County Residential Center =

Immigrant detention center in Pennsylvania, United States

Coordinates: 40°22′46″N 76°00′57″W

- Interactive map of Berks County Residential Center
- Location: 1040 Berks Road Bern Township Leesport Berks County, Pennsylvania
- Security class: Immigration detention facility
- Capacity: 96
- Opened: 2001
- Managed by: Berks County, Pennsylvania

Berks County Residential Center (BCRC), also known as Berks Family Residential Center and as the Berks County detention center, is a 96-bed immigration detention center in Leesport, Berks County, Pennsylvania, operated by Berks County on contract with U.S. Immigration and Customs Enforcement (ICE). The center operated as a family detention center from March 2001 to March 2021.

== History ==
In August 1994, Berks County started renting out detention center space at its youth detention center to the Immigration and Naturalization Service (INS), the predecessor to ICE, to house juvenile immigration detainees. An article about the subject quoted Theodore Nordmark, assistant director of the INS, noting that the location of the detention center was convenient for him from his Philadelphia office, and suggested the convenient location was one reason for choosing Berks County. The housing of detainees was estimated by the county to be profitable, even after accounting for their education expenses. By May 3, 2000, construction of a new building was planned, and Berks County was in discussions with INS to house families. On March 3, 2001, the Berks County Residential Center opened for use by INS for family immigration detention.

In January 2016, the Pennsylvania Department of Human Services (PA DHS) issued notice that the licensing of the Berks County Residential Center to operate as a child detention facility is being revoked and will not be renewed. The decision was appealed in February; PA DHS would issue reports of violations to the Berks County Residential Center in the years from 2016 to 2018.

In March 2021, ICE announced that no families were being detained at the Berks County Residential Center, and that the detention center will no longer be used for family detention. There were plans to repurpose it for adult detention. Later in the month, a lawsuit was filed by the Sheller Center for Social Justice at Temple University Law School against Berks County commissioners Christian Leinbach, Kevin Barnhardt, and Michael Rivera, claiming that Berks County commissioners have been talking to ICE about converting the facility into an immigrant women's prison but have refused to make any material public.

The Berks County Public Libraries headquarters is within the building according to the library system's website.

== Controversy ==
The Berks County detention center has been the subject of repeated controversy and criticism.

In 2016, a former guard at the Berks County Residential Center pled guilty to and was sentenced for repeatedly sexually assaulting a 19-year-old detainee from Honduras in 2014. In January 2020, Berks County settled, for $75,000, a related lawsuit brought by the victim against it for allowing the assault to happen.

In August 2016, 22 female detainees at Berks County Residential Center (a group calling themselves "Madres de Berks") went on hunger strike to protest the length and conditions of their detention. Their statement says that they have been detained for 270 to 365 days, well above the "20 days or less" that then-DHS Secretary Jeh Johnson claimed is the average length of stay in family detention.

Activists, officials, and legislators have called for the shutting down of the detention center many times. On September 25, 2021, 100 people turned up for a rally at Independence Mall seeking for the detention center to be shut down rather than reopened as a facility for adult women.
