= Joaquin Castro =

American politician (born 1974)

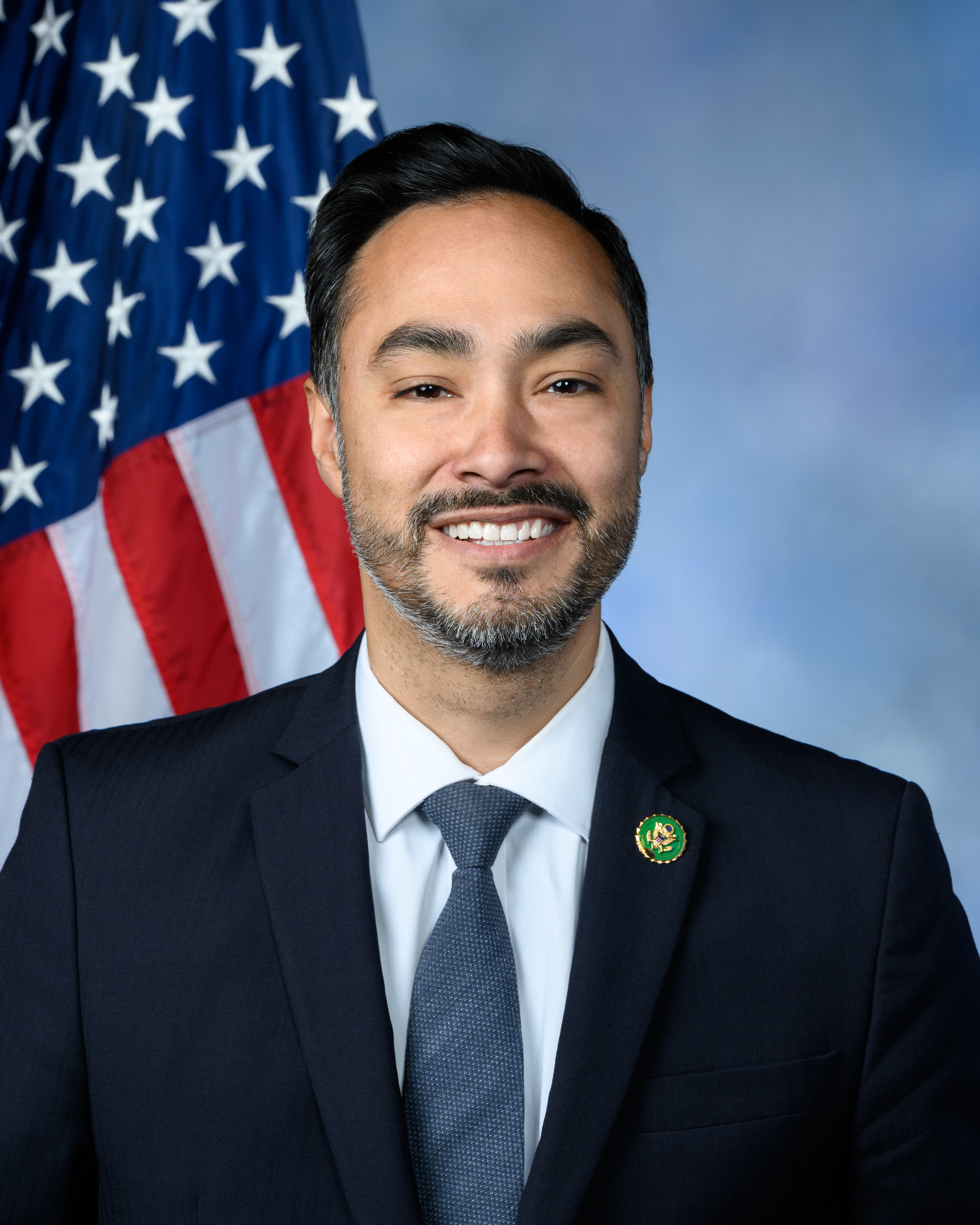
- Official portrait, 2023

Member of the U.S. House of Representatives from Texas's 20th district
- Incumbent
- Assumed office January 3, 2013
- Preceded by: Charlie Gonzalez

Member of the Texas House of Representatives from the 125th district
- In office January 3, 2003 – January 3, 2013
- Preceded by: Art Reyna
- Succeeded by: Justin Rodriguez

Personal details
- Born: September 16, 1974 (age 52) San Antonio, Texas, U.S.
- Party: Democratic
- Spouse: Anna Flores (m. 2013)
- Children: 3
- Relatives: Julian Castro (twin brother); Rosie Castro (mother)
- Education: Stanford University (BA); Harvard University (JD)
- Website: House website Campaign website
- Castro's voice Castro commemorating the Thursday Luncheon Group's 50th anniversary. Recorded February 1, 2023

Joaquin Castro (born September 16, 1974) is an American lawyer and Democratic politician who has represented Texas's 20th congressional district in the United States House of Representatives since 2013. The district includes just over half of his native San Antonio. He currently serves on the United States House Committee on Foreign Affairs and the United States House Permanent Select Committee on Intelligence.

From 2003 to 2013, Castro represented the 125th district in the Texas House of Representatives. While in the state legislature, he served as vice-chair of the Higher Education Committee and was a member of the Judiciary & Civil Jurisprudence Committee. He also previously served on other committees, such as County Affairs, Border & International Affairs, and Juvenile Justice & Family Issues.

Joaquin served as campaign chair for his identical twin brother, Julian Castro, during his 2020 presidential campaign.

The Center for Effective Lawmaking, at Vanderbilt University and the University of Virginia, ranked him as the most effective House Democrat in the 119th Congress (2023–25).

During the 2nd Trump administration Castro was instrumental in releasing improperly-detained migrant children and their families from the Dilley detention center, including the famous case of five-year-old Liam Conejo Ramos.

== Early life, education, and early career ==
Castro was born and raised in San Antonio, where he attended Thomas Jefferson High School. He was born a minute after his twin brother Julian. He has said that his interest in public service developed at a young age from watching his parents' involvement in political campaigns and civic causes. His father, Jessie Guzman, is a retired mathematics teacher from the Edgewood Independent School District on San Antonio's west side, and his mother, Marie "Rosie" Castro, is a community activist. Jessie and Rosie never married. Castro's mother named him after Rodolfo Gonzales's poem I Am Joaquin. He graduated with honors from Stanford University with a Bachelor of Arts in political science and communications and earned a Juris Doctor with his twin brother at Harvard Law School. After law school, the brothers both worked for the law firm Akin Gump Strauss Hauer & Feld before starting their own firm in 2005.

== Texas House of Representatives ==
=== Elections ===
Castro ran for Texas's 125th House district seat in 2002. In the Democratic primary, he defeated incumbent representative Arthur Reyna, 64% to 36%. In the general election, he defeated Republican nominee Nelson Balido, 60% to 40%. He was 28 at the time of his election. In 2004, he was reelected unopposed. In 2006, he was reelected to a third term, defeating Balido, 58% to 38%. In 2008, he was reelected to a fourth term unopposed. In 2010, he was reelected to a fifth term, defeating Libertarian Jeffrey Blunt, 78% to 22%.

=== Committee assignments ===
- County Affairs
- Higher Education (Vice Chair)
- Judiciary & Civil Jurisprudence
- Oversight of Higher Ed Governance, Excellence & Transparency

== U.S. House of Representatives ==
=== Elections ===
In June 2011, Castro announced his candidacy for the newly drawn Texas's 35th congressional district's seat in the U.S. House of Representatives. He was initially set to challenge fellow Democrat and nine-term incumbent Lloyd Doggett, whose home in Austin had been drawn into the district, in the Democratic primary, but on November 28, after Charlie Gonzalez of the neighboring 20th district announced his retirement after seven terms, Castro announced that he would run instead for the 20th district seat. He was unopposed in the Democratic primary, all but assuring him of winning the general election in this heavily Democratic, Hispanic-majority district. At the 2012 Democratic National Convention, he introduced his brother Julián as keynote speaker. In November, Castro defeated Republican nominee David Rosa 64%-34%. becoming only the fifth person to represent this district since its creation in 1935.

In 2017, San Antonio Express-News columnist Bruce Davidson questioned Castro's decision not to enter the 2018 U.S. Senate race against Republican incumbent Ted Cruz, a 2016 presidential candidate. Davidson predicted that Castro could have defeated the announced candidate, Beto O'Rourke, representative of Texas's 16th congressional district based in El Paso, for the Democratic nomination. "Castro is said to be ambitious, but will he ever have a better chance to move up than in the Trump-era against Ted Cruz?," Davidson wrote. He added that Texas's other senator, Republican John Cornyn, would have taken advantage of a similar opportunity to run. In 2002, Cornyn, the state's then one-term attorney general, filed to succeed retiring Republican Senator Phil Gramm, while two other Republican hopefuls, Henry Bonilla of Texas's 23rd congressional district and David Dewhurst, the land commissioner and later the lieutenant governor, vacillated and lost their chances to become a senator. Bonilla was defeated for House reelection after redistricting in 2006, and Dewhurst lost the 2012 Republican runoff Senate election to Cruz.

=== Tenure ===
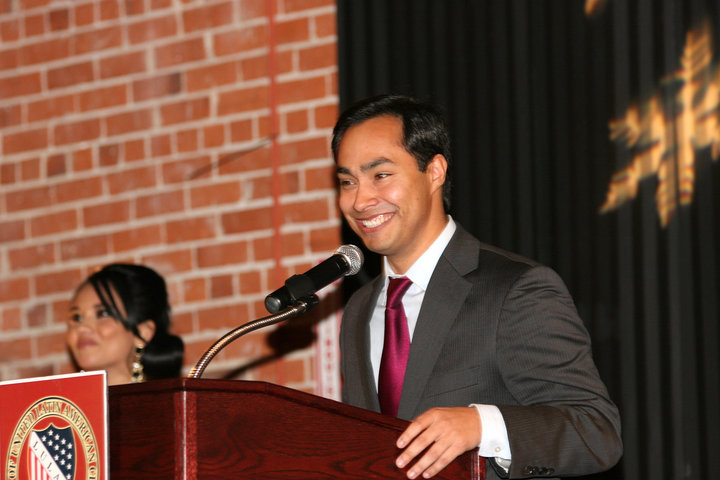
Representative Castro preparing to deliver a keynote speech at LULAC.

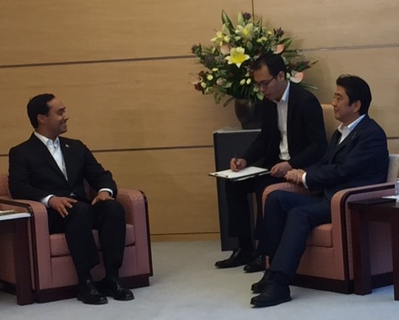
Castro with Japanese Prime Minister Shinzō Abe in August 2015

Castro was sworn into office on January 3, 2013, becoming a member of the 113th United States Congress. He was chosen as the president of the freshman class of Democrats in the 113th Congress.

In the 114th Congress, House Democratic whip Steny Hoyer named Castro a chief deputy whip. During the 2016 presidential election, Castro served as a surrogate for Hillary Clinton's campaign. He was selected as chair of the Congressional Hispanic Caucus for the 116th Congress.

On January 12, 2019, Castro introduced and endorsed his twin brother, former HUD secretary Julián Castro, at the launch rally of Julián's 2020 presidential campaign.

In February 2019, Castro authored House Joint Resolution 46 to overturn Trump's declaration of a National Emergency Concerning the Southern Border of the United States, under which Trump said he would divert funds from other sources to construct a wall along the U.S. and Mexico border. The bill passed the House by a vote of 245–182 on February 15, and the Senate by a vote of 59–41 on March 15. Trump vetoed the Joint Resolution on March 15.

In August 2019, Castro tweeted the names and employers of 44 San Antonio residents who had given the maximum allowable contribution to Trump's reelection campaign. He said it was "sad to see so many San Antonians" whose "contributions are fueling a campaign of hate that labels Hispanic immigrants as 'invaders'." The information came from publicly available lists published by the Federal Election Commission. Republicans denounced the tweet, saying that such a "target list" invites harassment and could even encourage violence.

In July 2020, following House Foreign Affairs Committee chairperson Eliot Engel's defeat for reelection, Castro declared his candidacy for chair. The other candidates were the eventually victorious Gregory Meeks and Brad Sherman, who had defeated former chairperson Howard Berman in a 2012 primary.

On January 12, 2021, Castro was named an impeachment manager (prosecutor) for Trump's second impeachment trial.

Castro was among the 46 Democrats who voted against final passage of the Fiscal Responsibility Act of 2023 in the House.

Castro voted with President Joe Biden's stated position 100% of the time, according to FiveThirtyEight analysis completed in January 2023.

During the second Trump administration, Castro has been instrumental in releasing improperly-detained migrant children and their families from the Dilley concentration camp. Castro publicizes the plights of sympathetic detainees and visits them in the camp. His activities shame immigration authorities into releasing the detainees and publicize the inhumane conditions in the camp. Castro's first visit was in January 2026, helping secure the release of Liam Conejo Ramos whom he accompanied back home. Many more relatives of detainees contact Castro for help than he can assist. He noted that many of these people had contacted their own Congressional representatives and received no reply.

He was critical of President Trump's threats against Iranian civilization in April 2026.

In May 2026, he wrote a letter to Secretary of State Marco Rubio asking him to confirm Israel's possession of nuclear weapons.

=== Committee assignments ===
- Permanent Select Committee on Intelligence
  - Central Intelligence Agency Subcommittee
  - National Security Agency & Cyber Subcommittee
- Committee on Foreign Affairs
  - United States House Foreign Affairs Subcommittee on Western Hemisphere (Ranking Member)
  - United States House Foreign Affairs Subcommittee on the Indo-Pacific

=== Caucus memberships ===
- Congressional Equality Caucus
- Congressional Progressive Caucus
- Congressional Taiwan Caucus
- Future Forum
- New Democrat Coalition
- Congressional Hispanic Caucus
- U.S.-Japan Caucus (Founder)
- Bipartisan Congressional Pre-K and Child Care Caucus (Founder)
- ASEAN Caucus (Founder)

== Personal life ==
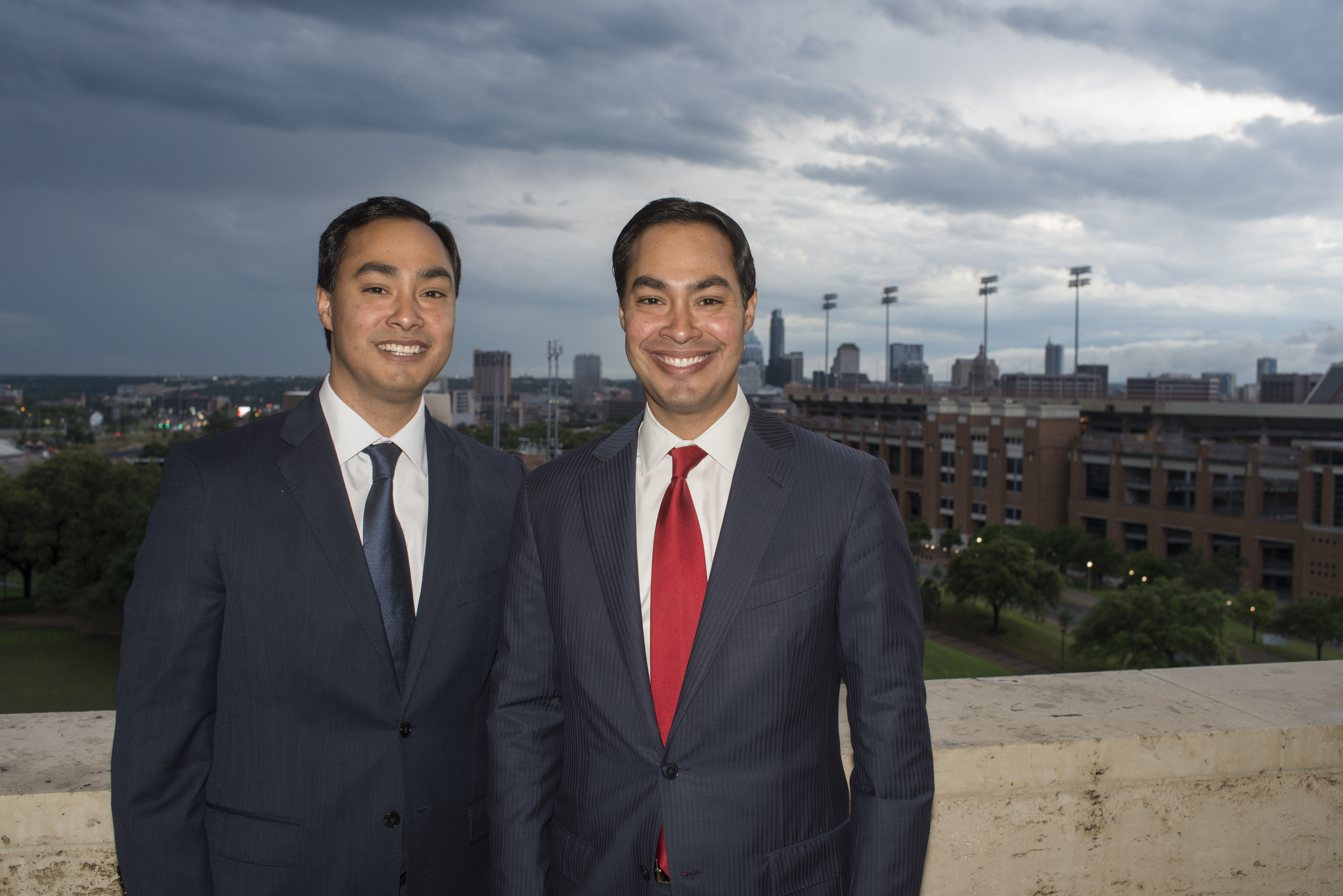
Representative Joaquin Castro (left) and his twin brother, then-San Antonio mayor Julián Castro (right), at the LBJ Presidential Library, in April 2013.

=== Family ===
Castro is the son of Jesse Guzman and Rosie Castro and the identical twin brother of Julián Castro, the former mayor of San Antonio and the 16th United States Secretary of Housing and Urban Development; he is one minute younger than Julián. In 2019, Joaquin grew a beard so that people could distinguish him from his brother.

In 2013, Castro became engaged to Anna Flores. Julián Castro made the announcement on his Facebook page. The couple had a daughter in 2013, a son in 2016, and a second daughter in 2022.

=== Other work and board memberships ===
While in the Texas Legislature, Castro practiced law in San Antonio. He has also been a visiting professor of law at St. Mary's University and an adjunct professor at Trinity University in San Antonio. He sits on several boards of nonprofit organizations and institutions of higher education, including the National College Advising Corps.

=== Health ===
In 2022, doctors discovered that Castro had two neuroendocrine tumors that had spread from his small intestine to his liver. At MD Anderson Cancer Center, he underwent major surgery that removed a third of his colon, his gall bladder, appendix, and 44 lymph nodes, 20 of which were cancerous. His treatment includes monthly Lanreotide injections to slow the tumors' growth, and he receives cancer scans every six months. Castro has said the tumors have not grown since diagnosis, but acknowledged the seriousness of his condition, joking he hopes they don’t grow for another 40 years. Despite his illness, he said he remains more concerned about the country than his own cancer which is why he remains interested in the 2026 Texas Senate race. He has three children aged 3 to 11 and lives with his wife Anna Flores as of 2025.

In February 2023, Castro had surgery to remove neuroendocrine tumors and described his prognosis as "good" afterward.

== See also ==
- List of Harvard University politicians
- List of Hispanic and Latino Americans in the United States Congress

U.S. House of Representatives
Preceded by Charlie Gonzalez	Member of the U.S. House of Representatives from Texas's 20th congressional district 2013–present	Incumbent
Preceded by Michelle Lujan Grisham	Chair of the Congressional Hispanic Caucus; 2019–2021	Succeeded by Raul Ruiz
U.S. order of precedence (ceremonial)
Preceded by Julia Brownley	United States representatives by seniority 102nd	Succeeded by Lois Frankel
