= 2018 Texas gubernatorial election =

- November 6, 2018
- Turnout: 53.01% (of registered voters) ▲19.31pp 42.07% (of voting age population)
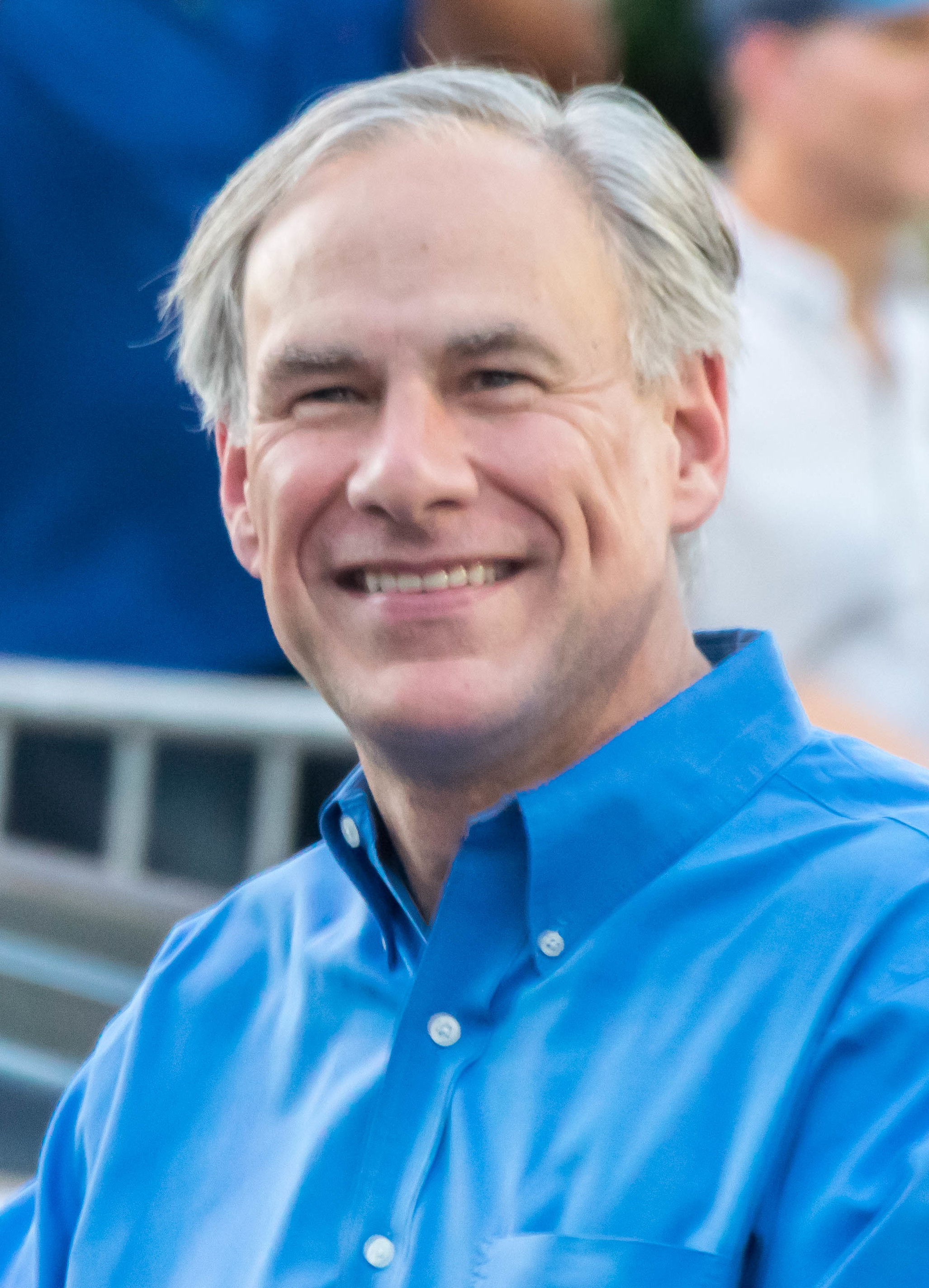

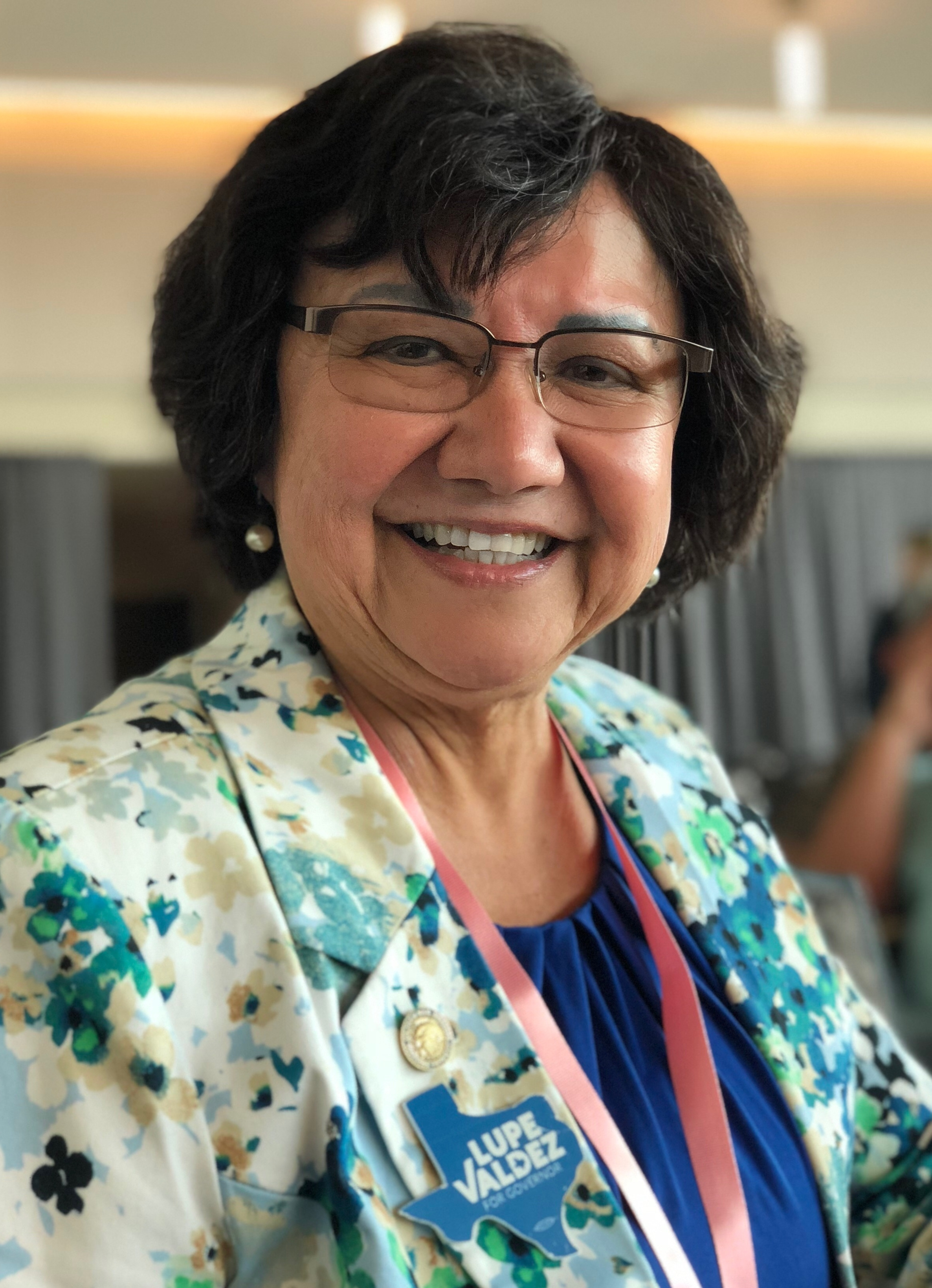
Nominee	Greg Abbott	Lupe Valdez
Party	Republican	Democratic
Popular vote	4,656,196	3,546,615
Percentage	55.81%	42.51%
- Abbott: 40–50% 50–60% 60–70% 70–80% 80–90% >90% Valdez: 40–50% 50–60% 60–70% 70–80% 80–90% >90% Tie: 40–50% 50% No data
Governor before election
Greg Abbott
Republican
Elected Governor
Greg Abbott
Republican

The 2018 Texas gubernatorial election took place on November 6, 2018, to elect the governor of Texas, concurrently with the election of Texas's Class I U.S. Senate seat, as well as other congressional, state, and local elections throughout the United States and Texas. Incumbent Republican governor Greg Abbott won re-election to a second term in office defeating Democratic nominee Lupe Valdez, the former sheriff of Dallas County, and Libertarian nominee Mark Tippetts, a former member of the Lago Vista city council.

The Republican and Democratic party primaries were held on March 6, 2018, making them the first primaries of the 2018 electoral season. Abbott won the March 6 primary with 90% of the vote to receive the Republican nomination, while Democratic candidates Lupe Valdez and Andrew White advanced to a May 22 runoff. Valdez defeated White in the runoff with 53.1% of the vote and faced Abbott in the general election as the Democratic nominee.

Valdez's nomination made her the first openly gay person nominated for governor by a major party in the state.

Tippetts was nominated at the Libertarian Party of Texas' state convention in Houston April 13–15, 2018. He defeated three challengers, as well as the None Of The Above option, on the first ballot and received more than 70% approval from Libertarian party delegates.

Despite considerably closer contests in other Texas state elections, Abbott handily won a second term with the highest margin of victory of any state executive official on the ballot, although Valdez also won the largest vote share for a Democratic gubernatorial candidate since Ann Richards in 1994. Tippetts' showing exceeded the previous record for most votes for a Libertarian nominee for Texas governor; that record had been set in 1990.

The election also took place alongside a closer, higher-profile Senate race between Beto O'Rourke and Ted Cruz, which may have played a factor in making the Democratic gubernatorial candidate considerably more competitive than in 2014. Abbott won a majority among white voters (72% to 26%), while Valdez won majorities among African Americans (80% to 16%) and Latinos (63% to 35%).

== Republican primary ==
=== Candidates ===
==== Nominated ====
- Greg Abbott, incumbent governor and former Texas attorney general

==== Eliminated in primary ====
- Larry Kilgore, secession activist
- Barbara Krueger, retired teacher

==== Declined ====
- Dan Patrick, lieutenant governor of Texas (running for re-election)
- Joe Straus, speaker of the Texas House of Representatives

=== Endorsements ===
Greg Abbott

U.S. executive branch officials

- Mike Pence, 48th vice president of the United States
- Donald Trump, 45th president of the United States

U.S. senators

- John Cornyn, U.S. senator (R-TX)
- Ted Cruz, U.S. senator (R-TX)

Statewide officeholders

- Dan Patrick, lieutenant governor of Texas

Organizations

- Empower Texans
- NRA Political Victory Fund

Newspapers

- The Dallas Morning News
Larry Kilgore

Religious leaders

- Flip Benham, evangelist and leader of Operation Save America
- Bob Enyart, pastor of Denver Bible Church
- Matt Trewhella, evangelist

=== Polling ===
Poll source	Date(s) administered	Sample size	Margin of error	Greg Abbott	Barbara Krueger	Other	Undecided
Dixie Strategies	February 22–23, 2018	–	± 4.7%	84%	2%	1%	13%
University of Texas	February 1–12, 2018	612	± 5.3%	95%	5%	0%	–

=== Results ===
Republican primary results
Party	Candidate	Votes	%
Republican	Greg Abbott (incumbent)	1,392,310	90.38%
Republican	Barbara Krueger	127,549	8.28%
Republican	Larry Kilgore	20,504	1.33%
Total votes		1,540,363	100.0%
Turnout			10.10%

== Democratic primary ==
=== Candidates ===
==== Nominated ====
- Lupe Valdez, former Dallas County sheriff

==== Eliminated in primary ====
- James Jolly Clark, businessman
- Cedric Davis, former mayor of Balch Springs
- Joe Mumbach, businessman
- Adrian Ocegueda, financial analyst
- Jeffrey Payne, businessman and 2009 International Mr. Leather
- Demetria Smith, mortgage broker
- Tom Wakely, hospice chaplain and nominee for TX-21 in 2016
- Andrew White, entrepreneur and son of Governor Mark White
- Grady Yarbrough, retired educator

==== Withdrew ====
- Garry Brown, candidate for Travis County Commission in 2014
- Lee Weaver

==== Declined ====
- Rafael Anchia, state representative
- Dwight Boykins, Houston city councilman
- Joaquín Castro, U.S. representative
- Julian Castro, former United States Secretary of Housing and Urban Development and mayor of San Antonio
- Mike Collier, businessman and nominee for comptroller in 2014 (running for lieutenant governor)
- Wendy Davis, former state senator and nominee in 2014
- Pete Gallego, former U.S. representative
- Eva Longoria, actress and political activist
- Jack Martin, CEO of Hill+Knowlton Strategies
- Trey Martinez Fischer, former state representative
- William McRaven, chancellor of the University of Texas System, retired Navy admiral and former commander of the United States Special Operations Command
- Michael Sorrell, president of Paul Quinn College
- Allen Vaught, former state representative

=== Endorsements ===
Jeffrey Payne

Newspapers

- The Bryan-College Station Eagle
Lupe Valdez

U.S. cabinet and cabinet-level officials

- Julián Castro, former United States Secretary of Housing and Urban Development and former mayor of San Antonio

U.S. representatives

- Joaquín Castro, U.S. representative (D-TX 20th District)
- Gabby Giffords, former U.S. representative (D-AZ 8th District) and gun control activist

Texas state senators

- Sylvia Garcia, former state senator (D-6th District) and U.S. representative for Texas's 29th congressional district
- José Menéndez, state senator (D-20th District)
- José Rodríguez, state senator (D-29th District)
- Leticia Van de Putte, former state senator (D-26th District), 2014 Democratic nominee for lieutenant governor, and 2015 candidate for mayor of San Antonio

Texas state representatives

- Roberto Alonzo, state representative (D-104th District)
- Carol Alvarado, state representative (D-145th District)
- Rafael Anchia, state representative (D-103rd District)
- Diana Arévalo, state representative (D-116th District)
- Diego Bernal, state representative (D-123rd District)
- César Blanco, state representative (D-76th District)
- Terry Canales, state representative (D-40th District)
- Nicole Collier, state representative (D-95th District)
- Jessica Farrar, state representative (D-148th District)
- Domingo García, former state representative (D-104th District)
- Mary González, state representative (D-75th District)
- Ryan Guillen, state representative (D-31st District)
- Ana Hernandez, state representative (D-143rd District)
- Gina Hinojosa, state representative (D-49th District)
- Celia Israel, state representative (D-50th District)
- Mando Martinez, state representative (D-39th District)
- Ina Minjarez, state representative (D-124th District)
- Sergio Muñoz, state representative (D-36th District)
- Victoria Neave, state representative (D-107th District)
- Poncho Nevárez, state representative (D-74th District)
- Lina Ortega, state representative (D-77th District)
- Ron Reynolds, state representative (D-27th District)
- Eddie Rodriguez, state representative (D-51st District)
- Justin Rodriguez, state representative (D-125th District)

Local officeholders

- Sammy Casados, Pasadena City Council member
- Theresa Daniel, Dallas County commissioner
- Chris Diaz, Harris County constable
- Robert Gallegos, Houston City Council member
- Adrian Garcia, former Harris County sheriff
- Elba Garcia, Dallas County commissioner
- Gilbert Gonzales, mayor of Raymondville, Texas
- Clay Jenkins, Dallas County judge
- Omar Lucio, sheriff of Cameron County, Texas
- John Wiley Price, Dallas County commissioner
- Jeff Travillion, Travis County commissioner
- Richard Wiles, sheriff of El Paso County, Texas

Individuals

- John Leguizamo, actor
- Diane Ravitch, former assistant secretary of education, educational policy analyst and research professor at New York University
- Cecile Richards, former president of Planned Parenthood and pro-choice activist

Organizations

- AFL–CIO
- Equality Texas
- Gay & Lesbian Victory Fund
- Houston Area Stonewall Democrats
- Planned Parenthood
- Stonewall Democrats of Austin
- Stonewall Democrats of Dallas
- Stonewall Democrats of Denton County
- Stonewall Democrats of San Antonio

Newspapers

- Austin Chronicle (first primary round only, did not endorse a candidate in runoff)
- Corpus Christi Caller-Times
Andrew White

Texas state representatives

- Garnet Coleman, state representative (D-147th District)

Local officeholders

- Cedric Davis, former mayor of Balch Springs and candidate for the 2018 gubernatorial Democratic nomination

Individuals

- Michael Cooper, pastor and candidate for the 2018 lieutenant governor Democratic nomination

Organizations

- Harris County Young Democrats
- Houston GLBT Political Caucus
- Houston Stonewall Young Democrats
- Jolt Texas
- Moms Demand Action
- North East Bexar County Democrats

Newspapers

- The Daily Texan
- The Dallas Morning News
- Fort Worth Star-Telegram
- Houston Chronicle
- San Antonio Express-News

=== First round ===
==== Polling ====
Poll source	Date(s) administered	Sample size	Margin of error	Adrian Ocegueda	Jeffrey Payne	Lupe Valdez	Tom Wakely	Andrew White	Grady Yarbrough	Other	Undecided
Dixie Strategies	February 22–23, 2018	–	± 5.7%	6%	1%	12%	2%	17%	1%	6%	54%
University of Texas	February 1–12, 2018	453	± 7.4%	5%	5%	43%	7%	24%	7%	8%	–

==== Results ====
Initial primary results by county Valdez: Valdez—60–70%; Valdez—50–60%; Valdez—40–50%; Valdez—30–40%; Valdez—20–30%; White: White—100%; White—50–60%; White—40–50%; White—30–40%; White—20–30%; Davis: Davis—60–70%; Davis—20–30%; Davis—<20%; Yarbrough: Yarbrough—20–30%; Yarbrough—30–40%; Payne: Payne—70–80%; Wakely: Wakely—30–40%; Wakely—20–30%; Tie: Tie

Democratic primary results
Party	Candidate	Votes	%
Democratic	Lupe Valdez	436,666	42.89%
Democratic	Andrew White	278,708	27.37%
Democratic	Cedric Davis Sr.	83,938	8.24%
Democratic	Grady Yarbrough	54,660	5.36%
Democratic	Jeffrey Payne	48,407	4.75%
Democratic	Adrian Ocegueda	44,825	4.40%
Democratic	Tom Wakely	34,889	3.42%
Democratic	James Clark	21,945	2.15%
Democratic	Joe Mumbach	13,921	1.36%
Total votes		1,017,959	100.0%
Turnout			6.67%

=== Runoff ===
Runoff results by county Valdez: Valdez—>90%; Valdez—80–90%; Valdez—70–80%; Valdez—60–70%; Valdez—50–60%; Tie: Tie; White: White—50–60%; White—60–70%; White—70–80%; White—80–90%; White—>90%; No vote: No vote

Lupe Valdez and Andrew White proceeded to a runoff on May 22 since neither received 50% of the vote in the first round of the primary. Lupe Valdez won the runoff.

==== Results ====
Democratic primary runoff results
Party	Candidate	Votes	%
Democratic	Lupe Valdez	227,577	53.1
Democratic	Andrew White	201,356	46.9
Total votes		432,180	100.0

== Libertarian nomination ==
=== Candidates ===
==== Nominated ====
- Mark Tippetts, former Lago Vista city councilman

==== Defeated at convention ====
- Kathie Glass, attorney and previous nominee
- Patrick Smith
- Kory Watkins, activist

== General election ==
=== Debates ===
- Complete video of debate, September 28, 2018

=== Endorsements ===
Greg Abbott (R)

Federal officials

- Mike Pence, vice president of the United States (2017-present)
- Donald Trump, president of the United States (2017-present)

U.S. senators

- John Cornyn, Texas (2002-present)
- Ted Cruz, Texas (2013-present)

Statewide officeholders

- Christi Craddick, railroad commissioner of Texas
- Sid Miller, agriculture commissioner of Texas
- Dan Patrick, lieutenant governor of Texas
- Ken Paxton, attorney general of Texas

State legislators

- 4 state senators (Note: Konni Burton, state senator (R-10th District); Bob Hall, state senator (R-2nd District); Don Huffines, state senator (R-16th District); Van Taylor, state senator (R-8th District))
- 7 state representatives (Note: Angie Chen Button, state representative (R-112th District); Linda Koop, state representative (R-102nd District); Jeff Leach, state representative (R-67th District); Matt Rinaldi, state representative (R-115th District); Scott Sanford, state representative (R-70th District); Matt Shaheen, state representative (R-66th District); Valoree Swanson, state representative (R-150th District))

Local officeholders

- Diane Costa, former mayor of Highland Village, Texas
- Faith Johnson, Dallas County district attorney

Individuals

- Glenn Beck, television/radio host and political commentator
- Jerry Jones, businessman and owner of the Dallas Cowboys
- Angela Paxton, wife of Texas Attorney General Ken Paxton and Republican candidate for Texas Senate, District 8

Organizations

- Associated Plumbing, Heating, Cooling Contractors of Texas
- Combined Law Enforcement Associations of Texas
- Dallas County Sheriff's Association
- Empower Texans
- National Federation of Independent Business
- NRA Political Victory Fund
- Rural Friends of Electric Cooperatives
- Texas Agricultural Aviation Association
- Texas Hospital Association
- Texas Pyrotechnic Association

Newspapers

- Dallas Morning News
- Fort Worth Star-Telegram
- San Antonio Express-News
Lupe Valdez (D)

U.S. cabinet and cabinet-level officials

- Julián Castro, former United States Secretary of Housing and Urban Development and former mayor of San Antonio
- Tom Perez, former United States Secretary of Labor and chairman of the Democratic National Committee

U.S. representatives

- Joaquín Castro, U.S. representative (D-TX 20th District)
- Gabby Giffords, former U.S. representative (D-AZ 8th District) and gun control activist
- Seth Moulton, U.S. representative (D-MA 6th District)

Texas state senators

- Wendy Davis, former state senator (D-District 10) and 2014 Democratic nominee for governor of Texas
- Sylvia Garcia, state senator (D-6th District) and Democratic nominee for Texas's 29th congressional district
- José Menéndez, state senator (D-20th District)
- José Rodríguez, state senator (D-29th District)
- Leticia Van de Putte, former state senator (D-26th District), 2014 Democratic nominee for lieutenant governor, and 2015 candidate for mayor of San Antonio

Texas state representatives

- Roberto Alonzo, state representative (D-104th District)
- Carol Alvarado, state representative (D-145th District)
- Rafael Anchia, state representative (D-103rd District)
- Diana Arévalo, state representative (D-116th District)
- Diego Bernal, state representative (D-123rd District)
- César Blanco, state representative (D-76th District)
- Terry Canales, state representative (D-40th District)
- Nicole Collier, state representative (D-95th District)
- Jessica Farrar, state representative (D-148th District)
- Domingo García, former state representative (D-104th District)
- Mary González, state representative (D-75th District)
- Ryan Guillen, state representative (D-31st District)
- Ana Hernandez, state representative (D-143rd District)
- Gina Hinojosa, state representative (D-49th District)
- Celia Israel, state representative (D-50th District)
- Eric Johnson, state representative (D-100th District)
- Mando Martinez, state representative (D-39th District)
- Ina Minjarez, state representative (D-124th District)
- Sergio Muñoz, state representative (D-36th District)
- Victoria Neave, state representative (D-107th District)
- Poncho Nevárez, state representative (D-74th District)
- Lina Ortega, state representative (D-77th District)
- Ron Reynolds, state representative (D-27th District)
- Eddie Rodriguez, state representative (D-51st District)
- Justin Rodriguez, state representative (D-125th District)
- Chris Turner, state representative (D-101st District) and chair of the Texas House Democratic Caucus

Local officeholders

- Sammy Casados, Pasadena City Council member
- Theresa Daniel, Dallas County commissioner
- Chris Diaz, Harris County constable
- Robert Gallegos, Houston City Council member
- Adrian Garcia, former Harris County sheriff
- Elba Garcia, Dallas County commissioner
- Gilbert Gonzales, mayor of Raymondville, Texas
- Clay Jenkins, Dallas County judge
- Omar Lucio, sheriff of Cameron County, Texas
- John Wiley Price, Dallas County commissioner
- Jeff Travillion, Travis County commissioner
- Richard Wiles, sheriff of El Paso County, Texas

Individuals

- Mike Collier, businessman and 2018 Democratic nominee for lieutenant governor of Texas
- John Leguizamo, actor
- Diane Ravitch, former assistant U.S. secretary of education, educational policy analyst and research professor at New York University
- Joy-Ann Reid, MSNBC national correspondent and television host
- Cecile Richards, former president of Planned Parenthood and pro-choice activist
- George Takei, actor
- Andrew White, businessman, son of former Texas Governor Mark White and candidate for the 2018 Texas gubernatorial Democratic nomination

Organizations

- AFL–CIO
- Annie's List
- Equality Texas
- Gay & Lesbian Victory Fund
- Human Rights Campaign
- Planned Parenthood
Mark Tippetts (L)

Governors

- Gary Johnson, former governor of New Mexico and Libertarian nominee for president of the United States in the 2012 and 2016 elections
- William Weld, former governor of Massachusetts and Libertarian nominee for vice president of the United States in the 2016 election

Individuals

- Christian Ehmling, political activist, editor in chief of East County Liberty Talk, former Republican candidate for Texas House of Representatives District 16
- Kinky Friedman, singer, songwriter, humorist, novelist, former candidate for governor, and former columnist for Texas Monthly
- Rob Kampia, co-founder and former executive director of the Marijuana Policy Project
- Mary Ruwart, biomedical researcher and Libertarian activist
- Nicholas Sarwark, chairman of the Libertarian National Committee

=== Predictions ===
Source	Ranking	As of
The Cook Political Report	Safe R	October 26, 2018
The Washington Post	Safe R	November 5, 2018
FiveThirtyEight	Safe R	November 5, 2018
Rothenberg Political Report	Safe R	November 1, 2018
Sabato's Crystal Ball	Safe R	November 5, 2018
RealClearPolitics	Safe R	November 4, 2018
Daily Kos	Safe R	November 5, 2018
Fox News (Note: The Fox News Midterm Power Rankings uniquely does not contain a category for Safe/Solid races)	Likely R	November 5, 2018
Politico	Safe R	November 5, 2018
Governing	Safe R	November 5, 2018

=== Polling ===
View source data.

Poll source	Date(s) administered	Sample size	Margin of error	Greg Abbott (R)	Lupe Valdez (D)	Mark Tippetts (L)	Other	Undecided
Emerson College	October 28–30, 2018	781	± 3.7%	51%	43%	2%	–	4%
Quinnipiac University	October 22–28, 2018	1,078	± 3.5%	54%	40%	–	1%	6%
University of Texas Tyler	October 15–28, 2018	1,033	± 3.0%	53%	32%	–	5%	10%
Dixie Strategies	October 25–26, 2018	588	± 4.0%	59%	33%	–	–	7%
University of Texas/YouGov	October 15–21, 2018	927	± 3.2%	56%	37%	3%	4%	–
Ipsos	October 12–18, 2018	1,298	± 3.2%	53%	38%	–	3%	6%
CNN/SSRS	October 9–13, 2018	716 LV	± 4.5%	57%	39%	–	0%	3%
CNN/SSRS	October 9–13, 2018	862 RV	± 4.1%	56%	38%	–	0%	4%
NYT Upshot/Siena College	October 8–11, 2018	800	± 3.6%	57%	35%	–	–	8%
Quinnipiac University	October 3–9, 2018	730	± 4.4%	58%	38%	–	0%	4%
Emerson College	October 1–5, 2018	500	± 4.5%	53%	33%	–	3%	11%
Epstein Group	September 15–24, 2018	1,200	± 2.9%	58%	29%	3%	–	10%
Vox Populi Polling	September 16–18, 2018	508	± 4.4%	55%	45%	–	–	–
Quinnipiac University	September 11–17, 2018	807	± 4.1%	58%	39%	–	0%	3%
Ipsos	September 6–14, 2018	992	± 4.0%	50%	41%	–	2%	6%
Crosswind Media & Public Relations	September 6–9, 2018	800	± 4.0%	52%	39%	–	–	–
Dixie Strategies	September 6–7, 2018	519	± 4.3%	53%	34%	1%	–	12%
Emerson College	August 22–25, 2018	550	± 4.4%	48%	28%	–	3%	20%
Marist College	August 12–16, 2018	759	± 3.8%	56%	37%	–	<1%	6%
Quinnipiac University	July 26–31, 2018	1,118	± 3.5%	51%	38%	–	1%	9%
Texas Lyceum	July 9–26, 2018	441 LV	± 4.7%	47%	31%	1%	–	22%
Texas Lyceum	July 9–26, 2018	806 RV	± 3.5%	44%	25%	3%	–	28%
Gravis Marketing	July 3–7, 2018	602	± 4.0%	51%	41%	–	–	8%
University of Texas/YouGov	June 8–17, 2018	1,200	± 2.8%	44%	32%	4%	4%	16%
Quinnipiac University	May 23–29, 2018	961	± 3.8%	53%	34%	–	1%	9%
JMC Analytics (R-Red Metrics Group)	May 19–21, 2018	575	± 4.1%	48%	36%	–	–	16%
Quinnipiac University	April 12–17, 2018	1,029	± 3.6%	49%	40%	–	0%	9%

Hypothetical polling

with Andrew White

Poll source	Date(s) administered	Sample size	Margin of error	Greg Abbott (R)	Andrew White (D)	Other	Undecided
JMC Analytics (R-Red Metrics Group)	May 19–21, 2018	575	± 4.1%	50%	39%	–	10%
Quinnipiac University	April 12–17, 2018	1,029	± 3.6%	48%	41%	0%	9%

with Julian Castro

Poll source	Date(s) administered	Sample size	Margin of error	Greg Abbott (R)	Julian Castro (D)	Other	Undecided
Public Policy Polling	August 12–14, 2016	944	± 3.2%	57%	28%	–	15%

with Wendy Davis

Poll source	Date(s) administered	Sample size	Margin of error	Greg Abbott (R)	Wendy Davis (D)	Other	Undecided
Public Policy Polling	August 12–14, 2016	944	± 3.2%	57%	32%	–	11%

=== Results ===
2018 Texas gubernatorial election
Party	Candidate	Votes	%	±%
Republican	Greg Abbott (incumbent)	4,656,196	55.81%	▼3.46
Democratic	Lupe Valdez	3,546,615	42.51%	▲3.61
Libertarian	Mark Tippetts	140,632	1.69%	▲0.28
Total votes		8,343,443	100.00%	
Majority		1,109,581	13.30%	▼7.07
Turnout		8,343,443	52.83%	▲14.45
Republican hold				

==== By county ====
County	Greg Abbott Republican		Lupe Valdez Democratic		Mark Tippetts Libertarian		Margin		Total
County	#	%	#	%	#	%	#	%	Total
Anderson	11,732	79.53%	2,868	19.44%	151	1.02%	8,864	60.09%	14,751
Andrews	3,400	82.42%	687	16.65%	38	0.92%	2,713	65.77%	4,125
Angelina	19,701	74.76%	6,406	24.31%	244	0.93%	13,295	50.45%	26,351
Aransas	7,075	78.79%	1,797	20.01%	108	1.20%	5,278	58.78%	8,980
Archer	3,259	90.28%	323	8.95%	28	0.78%	2,936	81.33%	3,610
Armstrong	822	91.84%	59	6.59%	14	1.56%	763	85.25%	895
Atascosa	8,361	68.68%	3,655	30.02%	158	1.30%	4,706	38.66%	12,174
Austin	9,009	81.68%	1,897	17.20%	123	1.12%	7,112	64.48%	11,029
Bailey	1,241	77.27%	348	21.67%	17	1.06%	893	55.60%	1,606
Bandera	7,866	82.04%	1,602	16.71%	120	1.25%	6,264	65.33%	9,588
Bastrop	16,351	59.68%	10,407	37.98%	640	2.34%	5,944	21.70%	27,398
Baylor	1,090	88.33%	129	10.45%	15	1.22%	961	77.88%	1,234
Bee	4,827	67.25%	2,261	31.50%	90	1.25%	2,566	35.75%	7,178
Bell	51,157	59.21%	33,803	39.12%	1,438	1.66%	17,354	20.09%	86,398
Bexar	251,043	45.95%	285,502	52.25%	9,852	1.80%	−34,459	−6.31%	546,397
Blanco	4,329	74.70%	1,351	23.31%	115	1.98%	2,978	51.39%	5,795
Borden	321	94.69%	17	5.01%	1	0.29%	304	89.68%	339
Bosque	5,948	83.10%	1,104	15.42%	106	1.48%	4,844	67.67%	7,158
Bowie	20,651	73.00%	7,357	26.01%	281	0.99%	13,294	46.99%	28,289
Brazoria	70,373	63.09%	39,536	35.44%	1,637	1.47%	30,837	27.65%	111,546
Brazos	39,424	61.44%	23,361	36.41%	1,383	2.16%	16,063	25.03%	64,168
Brewster	2,033	50.05%	1,933	47.59%	96	2.36%	100	2.46%	4,062
Briscoe	556	89.25%	58	9.31%	9	1.44%	498	79.94%	623
Brooks	658	35.22%	1,198	64.13%	12	0.64%	−540	−28.91%	1,868
Brown	10,640	86.93%	1,458	11.91%	142	1.16%	9,182	75.02%	12,240
Burleson	5,254	79.62%	1,277	19.35%	68	1.03%	3,977	60.27%	6,599
Burnet	14,497	78.16%	3,712	20.01%	340	1.83%	10,785	58.14%	18,549
Caldwell	6,723	58.68%	4,509	39.36%	225	1.96%	2,214	19.32%	11,457
Calhoun	4,409	72.07%	1,627	26.59%	82	1.34%	2,782	45.47%	6,118
Callahan	4,475	89.23%	486	9.69%	54	1.08%	3,989	79.54%	5,015
Cameron	34,407	44.39%	41,991	54.17%	1,113	1.44%	−7,584	−9.78%	77,511
Camp	2,816	72.48%	1,028	26.46%	41	1.06%	1,788	46.02%	3,885
Carson	2,209	90.05%	208	8.48%	36	1.47%	2,001	81.57%	2,453
Cass	8,323	80.89%	1,890	18.37%	76	0.74%	6,433	62.52%	10,289
Castro	1,226	75.91%	371	22.97%	18	1.11%	855	52.94%	1,615
Chambers	12,505	82.44%	2,460	16.22%	203	1.34%	10,045	66.22%	15,168
Cherokee	11,943	79.43%	2,938	19.54%	154	1.02%	9,005	59.89%	15,035
Childress	1,546	87.59%	206	11.67%	13	0.74%	1,340	75.92%	1,765
Clay	3,807	88.82%	449	10.48%	30	0.70%	3,358	78.35%	4,286
Cochran	550	81.00%	122	17.97%	7	1.03%	428	63.03%	679
Coke	1,187	89.92%	118	8.94%	15	1.14%	1,069	80.98%	1,320
Coleman	2,774	88.63%	328	10.48%	28	0.89%	2,446	78.15%	3,130
Collin	208,075	58.83%	139,175	39.35%	6,444	1.82%	68,900	19.48%	353,694
Collingsworth	827	88.07%	101	10.76%	11	1.17%	726	77.32%	939
Colorado	5,992	78.71%	1,558	20.46%	63	0.83%	4,434	58.24%	7,613
Comal	46,635	75.47%	14,145	22.89%	1,015	1.64%	32,490	52.58%	61,795
Comanche	3,906	84.67%	657	14.24%	50	1.08%	3,249	70.43%	4,613
Concho	825	83.93%	145	14.75%	13	1.32%	680	69.18%	983
Cooke	12,294	84.72%	2,054	14.15%	164	1.13%	10,240	70.56%	14,512
Coryell	11,281	70.81%	4,392	27.57%	258	1.62%	6,889	43.24%	15,931
Cottle	468	83.72%	88	15.74%	3	0.54%	380	67.98%	559
Crane	842	80.42%	197	18.82%	8	0.76%	645	61.60%	1,047
Crockett	921	72.75%	333	26.30%	12	0.95%	588	46.45%	1,266
Crosby	1,005	70.92%	392	27.66%	20	1.41%	613	43.26%	1,417
Culberson	324	42.80%	422	55.75%	11	1.45%	−98	−12.95%	757
Dallam	985	87.79%	129	11.50%	8	0.71%	856	76.29%	1,122
Dallas	283,659	39.18%	425,208	58.74%	15,030	2.08%	−141,549	−19.55%	723,897
Dawson	2,240	74.44%	739	24.56%	30	1.00%	1,501	49.88%	3,009
Deaf Smith	2,788	73.89%	957	25.36%	28	0.74%	1,831	48.53%	3,773
Delta	1,606	82.95%	301	15.55%	29	1.50%	1,305	67.41%	1,936
Denton	174,472	59.25%	113,808	38.65%	6,194	2.10%	60,664	20.60%	294,474
Dewitt	5,115	83.59%	942	15.39%	62	1.01%	4,173	68.20%	6,119
Dickens	656	86.54%	96	12.66%	6	0.79%	560	73.88%	758
Dimmit	1,042	36.55%	1,787	62.68%	22	0.77%	−745	−26.13%	2,851
Donley	1,130	88.01%	134	10.44%	20	1.56%	996	77.57%	1,284
Duval	1,479	37.37%	2,457	62.08%	22	0.56%	−978	−24.71%	3,958
Eastland	5,434	87.66%	708	11.42%	57	0.92%	4,726	76.24%	6,199
Ector	21,934	71.78%	8,211	26.87%	412	1.35%	13,723	44.91%	30,557
Edwards	635	85.58%	100	13.48%	7	0.94%	535	72.10%	742
Ellis	43,647	72.14%	15,879	26.25%	975	1.61%	27,768	45.90%	60,501
El Paso	62,749	31.28%	134,181	66.88%	3,699	1.84%	−71,432	−35.60%	200,629
Erath	10,356	82.22%	2,073	16.46%	167	1.33%	8,283	65.76%	12,596
Falls	3,344	71.62%	1,286	27.54%	39	0.84%	2,058	44.08%	4,669
Fannin	8,856	82.35%	1,767	16.43%	131	1.22%	7,089	65.92%	10,754
Fayette	8,576	81.98%	1,777	16.99%	108	1.03%	6,799	64.99%	10,461
Fisher	1,161	78.02%	310	20.83%	17	1.14%	851	57.19%	1,488
Floyd	1,448	77.14%	412	21.95%	17	0.91%	1,036	55.19%	1,877
Foard	331	75.92%	101	23.17%	4	0.92%	230	52.75%	436
Fort Bend	125,867	49.39%	125,374	49.19%	3,613	1.42%	493	0.19%	254,854
Franklin	3,359	84.93%	537	13.58%	59	1.49%	2,822	71.35%	3,955
Freestone	5,336	81.60%	1,143	17.48%	60	0.92%	4,193	64.12%	6,539
Frio	1,844	50.74%	1,739	47.85%	51	1.40%	105	2.89%	3,634
Gaines	3,305	86.22%	475	12.39%	53	1.38%	2,830	73.83%	3,833
Galveston	72,104	63.56%	39,314	34.66%	2,017	1.78%	32,790	28.91%	113,435
Garza	1,078	84.42%	186	14.57%	13	1.02%	892	69.85%	1,277
Gillespie	10,351	82.51%	2,030	16.18%	164	1.31%	8,321	66.33%	12,545
Glasscock	515	93.13%	36	6.51%	2	0.36%	479	86.62%	553
Goliad	2,397	78.28%	617	20.15%	48	1.57%	1,780	58.13%	3,062
Gonzales	4,393	78.24%	1,170	20.84%	52	0.93%	3,223	57.40%	5,615
Gray	5,330	89.61%	551	9.26%	67	1.13%	4,779	80.35%	5,948
Grayson	32,562	75.68%	9,857	22.91%	608	1.41%	22,705	52.77%	43,027
Gregg	25,558	71.03%	10,015	27.83%	408	1.13%	15,543	43.20%	35,981
Grimes	6,684	77.33%	1,858	21.49%	102	1.18%	4,826	55.83%	8,644
Guadalupe	36,284	66.69%	17,265	31.74%	854	1.57%	19,019	34.96%	54,403
Hale	5,532	75.03%	1,727	23.42%	114	1.55%	3,805	51.61%	7,373
Hall	815	84.54%	142	14.73%	7	0.73%	673	69.81%	964
Hamilton	2,903	86.97%	405	12.13%	30	0.90%	2,498	74.84%	3,338
Hansford	1,548	91.54%	118	6.98%	25	1.48%	1,430	84.57%	1,691
Hardeman	997	86.17%	154	13.31%	6	0.52%	843	72.86%	1,157
Hardin	17,528	87.60%	2,327	11.63%	155	0.77%	15,201	75.97%	20,010
Harris	559,819	46.39%	628,804	52.11%	18,094	1.50%	−68,985	−5.72%	1,206,717
Harrison	16,747	74.21%	5,562	24.65%	257	1.14%	11,185	49.57%	22,566
Hartley	1,491	91.87%	125	7.70%	7	0.43%	1,366	84.17%	1,623
Haskell	1,387	83.15%	267	16.01%	14	0.84%	1,120	67.15%	1,668
Hays	37,895	47.65%	39,486	49.65%	2,144	2.70%	−1,591	−2.00%	79,525
Hemphill	1,199	87.84%	152	11.14%	14	1.03%	1,047	76.70%	1,365
Henderson	21,775	81.55%	4,622	17.31%	306	1.15%	17,153	64.24%	26,703
Hidalgo	55,421	36.70%	93,935	62.20%	1,670	1.11%	−38,514	−25.50%	151,026
Hill	9,262	81.03%	2,052	17.95%	116	1.01%	7,210	63.08%	11,430
Hockley	4,947	81.47%	1,030	16.96%	95	1.56%	3,917	64.51%	6,072
Hood	20,865	83.66%	3,765	15.10%	310	1.24%	17,100	68.56%	24,940
Hopkins	9,533	80.24%	2,218	18.67%	129	1.09%	7,315	61.57%	11,880
Houston	5,659	76.99%	1,641	22.33%	50	0.68%	4,018	54.67%	7,350
Howard	5,737	77.83%	1,542	20.92%	92	1.25%	4,195	56.91%	7,371
Hudspeth	538	60.72%	335	37.81%	13	1.47%	203	22.91%	886
Hunt	22,078	77.70%	5,946	20.93%	389	1.37%	16,132	56.78%	28,413
Hutchinson	5,874	88.46%	687	10.35%	79	1.19%	5,187	78.12%	6,640
Irion	641	86.97%	87	11.80%	9	1.22%	554	75.17%	737
Jack	2,539	90.32%	246	8.75%	26	0.92%	2,293	81.57%	2,811
Jackson	4,016	84.41%	715	15.03%	27	0.57%	3,301	69.38%	4,758
Jasper	9,732	82.42%	1,990	16.85%	86	0.73%	7,742	65.57%	11,808
Jeff Davis	719	61.72%	407	34.94%	39	3.35%	312	26.78%	1,165
Jefferson	38,999	52.51%	34,516	46.48%	751	1.01%	4,483	6.04%	74,266
Jim Hogg	509	34.98%	938	64.47%	8	0.55%	−429	−29.48%	1,455
Jim Wells	5,088	52.02%	4,616	47.19%	77	0.79%	472	4.83%	9,781
Johnson	41,485	79.22%	10,105	19.30%	774	1.48%	31,380	59.93%	52,364
Jones	4,167	83.66%	757	15.20%	57	1.14%	3,410	68.46%	4,981
Karnes	3,023	73.32%	1,054	25.56%	46	1.12%	1,969	47.76%	4,123
Kaufman	27,491	71.70%	10,294	26.85%	559	1.46%	17,197	44.85%	38,344
Kendall	16,076	81.42%	3,382	17.13%	286	1.45%	12,694	64.29%	19,744
Kenedy	111	64.91%	57	33.33%	3	1.75%	54	31.58%	171
Kent	299	88.72%	34	10.09%	4	1.19%	265	78.64%	337
Kerr	17,566	79.37%	4,268	19.28%	298	1.35%	13,298	60.08%	22,132
Kimble	1,529	89.26%	161	9.40%	23	1.34%	1,368	79.86%	1,713
King	120	94.49%	6	4.72%	1	0.79%	114	89.76%	127
Kinney	890	74.73%	290	24.35%	11	0.92%	600	50.38%	1,191
Kleberg	4,831	56.44%	3,629	42.40%	99	1.16%	1,202	14.04%	8,559
Knox	866	79.16%	217	19.84%	11	1.01%	649	59.32%	1,094
Lamar	13,103	79.25%	3,231	19.54%	200	1.21%	9,872	59.71%	16,534
Lamb	2,785	80.75%	629	18.24%	35	1.01%	2,156	62.51%	3,449
Lampasas	6,073	80.79%	1,343	17.87%	101	1.34%	4,730	62.92%	7,517
LaSalle	728	49.86%	725	49.66%	7	0.48%	3	0.21%	1,460
Lavaca	6,856	88.68%	830	10.74%	45	0.58%	6,026	77.95%	7,731
Lee	4,650	79.68%	1,129	19.35%	57	0.98%	3,521	60.33%	5,836
Leon	5,781	87.82%	751	11.41%	51	0.77%	5,030	76.41%	6,583
Liberty	16,527	80.44%	3,816	18.57%	203	0.99%	12,711	61.87%	20,546
Limestone	5,330	77.06%	1,535	22.19%	52	0.75%	3,795	54.86%	6,917
Lipscomb	947	89.00%	109	10.24%	8	0.75%	838	78.76%	1,064
Live Oak	3,114	85.39%	504	13.82%	29	0.80%	2,610	71.57%	3,647
Llano	8,287	81.44%	1,751	17.21%	138	1.36%	6,536	64.23%	10,176
Loving	47	83.93%	9	16.07%	0	0.00%	38	67.86%	56
Lubbock	61,775	67.76%	27,266	29.91%	2,133	2.34%	34,509	37.85%	91,174
Lynn	1,380	81.37%	302	17.81%	14	0.83%	1,078	63.56%	1,696
Madison	3,081	80.40%	722	18.84%	29	0.76%	2,359	61.56%	3,832
Marion	2,553	72.43%	939	26.64%	33	0.94%	1,614	45.79%	3,525
Martin	1,303	84.28%	229	14.81%	14	0.91%	1,074	69.47%	1,546
Mason	1,605	81.93%	333	17.00%	21	1.07%	1,272	64.93%	1,959
Matagorda	7,705	73.49%	2,673	25.50%	106	1.01%	5,032	48.00%	10,484
Maverick	3,495	33.09%	6,940	65.71%	126	1.19%	−3,445	−32.62%	10,561
McCulloch	2,275	85.01%	368	13.75%	33	1.23%	1,907	71.26%	2,676
McLennan	49,195	65.59%	24,734	32.98%	1,079	1.44%	24,461	32.61%	75,008
McMullen	395	92.07%	33	7.69%	1	0.23%	362	84.38%	429
Medina	12,057	74.49%	3,964	24.49%	166	1.03%	8,093	50.00%	16,187
Menard	646	82.82%	130	16.67%	4	0.51%	516	66.15%	780
Midland	34,049	79.48%	8,101	18.91%	692	1.62%	25,948	60.57%	42,842
Milam	6,080	76.10%	1,795	22.47%	115	1.44%	4,285	53.63%	7,990
Mills	1,790	88.88%	206	10.23%	18	0.89%	1,584	78.65%	2,014
Mitchell	1,595	83.64%	298	15.63%	14	0.73%	1,297	68.01%	1,907
Montague	6,563	88.59%	765	10.33%	80	1.08%	5,798	78.27%	7,408
Montgomery	144,664	76.01%	43,044	22.62%	2,602	1.37%	101,620	53.40%	190,310
Moore	3,268	80.53%	750	18.48%	40	0.99%	2,518	62.05%	4,058
Morris	3,018	71.50%	1,159	27.46%	44	1.04%	1,859	44.04%	4,221
Motley	458	92.15%	35	7.04%	4	0.80%	423	85.11%	497
Nacogdoches	14,411	66.97%	6,843	31.80%	264	1.23%	7,568	35.17%	21,518
Navarro	10,818	75.08%	3,411	23.67%	179	1.24%	7,407	51.41%	14,408
Newton	3,771	80.75%	870	18.63%	29	0.62%	2,901	62.12%	4,670
Nolan	3,200	78.86%	807	19.89%	51	1.26%	2,393	58.97%	4,058
Nueces	52,918	56.33%	39,720	42.28%	1,312	1.40%	13,198	14.05%	93,950
Ochiltree	2,169	90.11%	212	8.81%	26	1.08%	1,957	81.30%	2,407
Oldham	742	91.72%	62	7.66%	5	0.62%	680	84.05%	809
Orange	21,724	82.64%	4,348	16.54%	214	0.81%	17,376	66.10%	26,286
Palo Pinto	7,811	82.83%	1,529	16.21%	90	0.95%	6,282	66.62%	9,430
Panola	7,182	82.20%	1,494	17.10%	61	0.70%	5,688	65.10%	8,737
Parker	45,981	83.87%	8,099	14.77%	745	1.36%	37,882	69.10%	54,825
Parmer	1,680	82.11%	352	17.20%	14	0.68%	1,328	64.91%	2,046
Pecos	2,299	65.63%	1,167	33.31%	37	1.06%	1,132	32.32%	3,503
Polk	13,130	78.49%	3,378	20.19%	220	1.32%	9,752	58.30%	16,728
Potter	17,299	71.01%	6,674	27.40%	389	1.60%	10,625	43.61%	24,362
Presidio	465	28.15%	1,157	70.04%	30	1.82%	−692	−41.89%	1,652
Rains	3,810	86.45%	566	12.84%	31	0.70%	3,244	73.61%	4,407
Randall	39,586	81.84%	8,065	16.67%	717	1.48%	31,521	65.17%	48,368
Reagan	697	83.37%	127	15.19%	12	1.44%	570	68.18%	836
Real	1,341	85.63%	213	13.60%	12	0.77%	1,128	72.03%	1,566
Red River	3,476	78.89%	904	20.52%	26	0.59%	2,572	58.37%	4,406
Reeves	1,210	51.34%	1,123	47.65%	24	1.02%	87	3.69%	2,357
Refugio	1,726	69.15%	751	30.09%	19	0.76%	975	39.06%	2,496
Roberts	448	95.52%	16	3.41%	5	1.07%	432	92.11%	469
Robertson	4,448	71.13%	1,753	28.03%	52	0.83%	2,695	43.10%	6,253
Rockwall	28,582	73.98%	9,432	24.41%	622	1.61%	19,150	49.57%	38,636
Runnels	2,885	88.55%	345	10.59%	28	0.86%	2,540	77.96%	3,258
Rusk	12,864	79.19%	3,233	19.90%	147	0.90%	9,631	59.29%	16,244
Sabine	3,477	87.85%	458	11.57%	23	0.58%	3,019	76.28%	3,958
San Augustine	2,296	76.53%	684	22.80%	20	0.67%	1,612	53.73%	3,000
San Jacinto	7,722	82.72%	1,529	16.38%	84	0.90%	6,193	66.34%	9,335
San Patricio	12,173	66.83%	5,842	32.07%	201	1.10%	6,331	34.76%	18,216
San Saba	1,835	89.12%	211	10.25%	13	0.63%	1,624	78.87%	2,059
Schleicher	758	79.21%	187	19.54%	12	1.25%	571	59.67%	957
Scurry	3,750	85.85%	577	13.21%	41	0.94%	3,173	72.64%	4,368
Shackelford	1,190	92.61%	87	6.77%	8	0.62%	1,103	85.84%	1,285
Shelby	6,132	81.30%	1,366	18.11%	44	0.58%	4,766	63.19%	7,542
Sherman	701	85.80%	74	9.06%	42	5.14%	627	76.74%	817
Smith	55,708	72.13%	20,623	26.70%	898	1.16%	35,085	45.43%	77,229
Somervell	3,143	85.31%	499	13.55%	42	1.14%	2,644	71.77%	3,684
Starr	3,217	31.29%	6,968	67.78%	95	0.92%	−3,751	−36.49%	10,280
Stephens	2,653	89.39%	291	9.80%	24	0.81%	2,362	79.58%	2,968
Sterling	445	91.19%	39	7.99%	4	0.82%	406	83.20%	488
Stonewall	503	82.46%	96	15.74%	11	1.80%	407	66.72%	610
Sutton	939	78.32%	248	20.68%	12	1.00%	691	57.63%	1,199
Swisher	1,491	79.10%	368	19.52%	26	1.38%	1,123	59.58%	1,885
Tarrant	340,404	54.39%	273,814	43.75%	11,676	1.87%	66,590	10.64%	625,894
Taylor	31,152	76.53%	8,880	21.82%	673	1.65%	22,272	54.72%	40,705
Terrell	316	69.45%	136	29.89%	3	0.66%	180	39.56%	455
Terry	2,221	79.26%	552	19.70%	29	1.03%	1,669	59.56%	2,802
Throckmorton	625	89.67%	63	9.04%	9	1.29%	562	80.63%	697
Titus	5,861	73.48%	2,017	25.29%	98	1.23%	3,844	48.19%	7,976
Tom Green	25,792	74.43%	8,373	24.16%	488	1.41%	17,419	50.27%	34,653
Travis	145,910	30.41%	320,550	66.81%	13,360	2.78%	−174,640	−36.40%	479,820
Trinity	4,293	83.05%	835	16.15%	41	0.79%	3,458	66.90%	5,169
Tyler	6,079	85.39%	973	13.67%	67	0.94%	5,106	71.72%	7,119
Upshur	11,638	83.08%	2,177	15.54%	194	1.38%	9,461	67.54%	14,009
Upton	860	84.65%	148	14.57%	8	0.79%	712	70.08%	1,016
Uvalde	4,755	60.15%	3,070	38.84%	80	1.01%	1,685	21.32%	7,905
Val Verde	5,993	52.73%	5,241	46.12%	131	1.15%	752	6.62%	11,365
Van Zandt	15,609	86.96%	2,150	11.98%	190	1.06%	13,459	74.98%	17,949
Victoria	19,599	72.20%	7,245	26.69%	303	1.12%	12,354	45.51%	27,147
Walker	12,199	68.55%	5,331	29.96%	266	1.49%	6,868	38.59%	17,796
Waller	10,639	64.09%	5,791	34.89%	170	1.02%	4,848	29.20%	16,600
Ward	2,201	75.22%	690	23.58%	35	1.20%	1,511	51.64%	2,926
Washington	10,532	78.19%	2,730	20.27%	208	1.54%	7,802	57.92%	13,470
Webb	16,287	33.30%	32,055	65.54%	569	1.16%	−15,768	−32.24%	48,911
Wharton	9,472	73.36%	3,332	25.81%	107	0.83%	6,140	47.56%	12,911
Wheeler	1,682	92.37%	126	6.92%	13	0.71%	1,556	85.45%	1,821
Wichita	24,817	73.16%	8,614	25.40%	489	1.44%	16,203	47.77%	33,920
Wilbarger	2,722	78.74%	685	19.81%	50	1.45%	2,037	58.92%	3,457
Willacy	1,931	45.69%	2,257	53.41%	38	0.90%	−326	−7.71%	4,226
Williamson	112,214	54.08%	90,002	43.37%	5,297	2.55%	22,212	10.70%	207,513
Wilson	13,704	77.41%	3,800	21.47%	199	1.12%	9,904	55.95%	17,703
Winkler	1,150	79.15%	284	19.55%	19	1.31%	866	59.60%	1,453
Wise	19,633	84.92%	3,184	13.77%	303	1.31%	16,449	71.15%	23,120
Wood	14,406	85.34%	2,324	13.77%	151	0.89%	12,082	71.57%	16,881
Yoakum	1,558	82.30%	303	16.01%	32	1.69%	1,255	66.30%	1,893
Young	5,579	87.28%	726	11.36%	87	1.36%	4,853	75.92%	6,392
Zapata	861	39.71%	1,292	59.59%	15	0.69%	−431	−19.88%	2,168
Zavala	748	26.25%	2,082	73.05%	20	0.70%	−1,334	−46.81%	2,850
TOTALS	4,656,196	55.81%	3,546,615	42.51%	140,632	1.69%	1,109,581	13.30%	8,343,443

==== Counties that flipped from Republican to Democratic ====
- Bexar (largest municipality: San Antonio)
- Culberson (largest municipality: Van Horn)
- Harris (largest municipality: Houston)
- Hays (largest municipality: San Marcos)

==== Counties that flipped from Democratic to Republican ====
- Frio (largest municipality: Pearsall)
- Jim Wells (largest municipality: Alice)
- Val Verde (largest municipality: Del Rio)

==== By congressional district ====
Abbott won 25 of 36 congressional districts, including two that elected Democrats.

District	Abbott	Valdez	Representative
1st	74%	25%	Louie Gohmert
2nd	56%	43%	Ted Poe
2nd	56%	43%	Dan Crenshaw
3rd	58%	41%	Sam Johnson
3rd	58%	41%	Van Taylor
4th	77%	22%	John Ratcliffe
5th	64%	34%	Jeb Hensarling
5th	64%	34%	Lance Gooden
6th	56%	42%	Joe Barton
6th	56%	42%	Ron Wright
7th	52%	46%	John Culberson
7th	52%	46%	Lizzie Fletcher
8th	75%	24%	Kevin Brady
9th	23%	75%	Al Green
10th	54%	44%	Michael McCaul
11th	80%	18%	Mike Conaway
12th	65%	34%	Kay Granger
13th	81%	17%	Mac Thornberry
14th	62%	37%	Randy Weber
15th	48%	51%	Vicente Gonzalez
16th	32%	66%	Beto O'Rourke
16th	32%	66%	Veronica Escobar
17th	59%	39%	Bill Flores
18th	25%	73%	Sheila Jackson Lee
19th	74%	24%	Jodey Arrington
20th	39%	59%	Joaquín Castro
21st	55%	43%	Lamar Smith
21st	55%	43%	Chip Roy
22nd	56%	43%	Pete Olson
23rd	53%	46%	Will Hurd
24th	54%	44%	Kenny Marchant
25th	57%	41%	Roger Williams
26th	62%	36%	Michael Burgess
27th	66%	33%	Michael Cloud
28th	46%	53%	Henry Cuellar
29th	30%	69%	Gene Green
29th	30%	69%	Sylvia Garcia
30th	22%	76%	Eddie Bernice Johnson
31st	56%	42%	John Carter
32nd	52%	46%	Pete Sessions
32nd	52%	46%	Colin Allred
33rd	26%	73%	Marc Veasey
34th	49%	50%	Filemon Vela Jr.
35th	33%	65%	Lloyd Doggett
36th	74%	24%	Brian Babin

== Analysis ==
=== Voter demographics ===
Voter demographic data was collected by CNN. The voter survey is based on exit polls.

2018 Texas gubernatorial election (CNN)
Demographic subgroup	Abbott	Valdez	% of total vote
Ideology
Liberals	11	83	22
Moderates	43	55	35
Conservatives	88	11	43
Party
Democrats	11	87	34
Republicans	93	4	39
Independents	55	40	27
Age
18–24 years old	34	53	8
25–29 years old	31	68	7
30–39 years old	53	44	15
40–49 years old	58	41	17
50–64 years old	60	36	26
65 and older	62	37	27
Gender
Men	60	36	49
Women	50	47	51
Marital status
Married	60	37	66
Unmarried	45	53	34
Marital status by gender
Married men	63	35	34
Married women	55	40	31
Unmarried men	48	50	15
Unmarried women	43	56	20
Race
White	69	29	57
Non-white	36	60	43
Race/ethnicity
White	69	29	57
Black	15	82	12
Latino	42	53	26
Asian	N/A	N/A	3
Other	N/A	N/A	3
Gender by race
White men	75	23	27
White women	65	34	29
Black men	24	75	6
Black women	8	89	6
Latino men	42	49	12
Latino women	42	56	13
Other racial/ethnic groups	53	46	6
Education
Never attended college	57	41	21
Some college education	57	37	26
Associate degree	53	44	14
Bachelor's degree	58	40	25
Advanced degree	46	53	15
Education by race
White college graduates	61	37	26
White no college degree	76	22	31
Non-white college graduates	38	61	14
Non-white no college degree	35	60	29
Education by gender/race
White women with college degrees	56	42	13
White women without college degrees	72	28	17
White men with college degrees	67	32	13
White men without college degrees	81	15	14
Non-white	36	60	43
Income
Under $50K	48	50	35
$50K-$100K	57	43	31
$100K or more	69	34	34
2016 presidential vote
Trump	94	3	46
Clinton	14	85	37
Other	N/A	N/A	5
Did not vote	N/A	N/A	11
Issue regarded as most important
Immigration	74	16	34
Economy	61	36	21
Healthcare	36	62	36
Gun policy	N/A	N/A	6
Area type
Urban	45	51	41
Suburban	59	38	46
Rural	73	26	13
