= 2015 San Antonio mayoral election =

- May 9, 2015 (first round); June 13, 2015 (runoff)
- Turnout: 14.12% ▲ (first round)
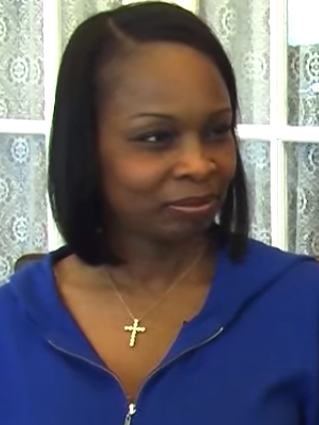

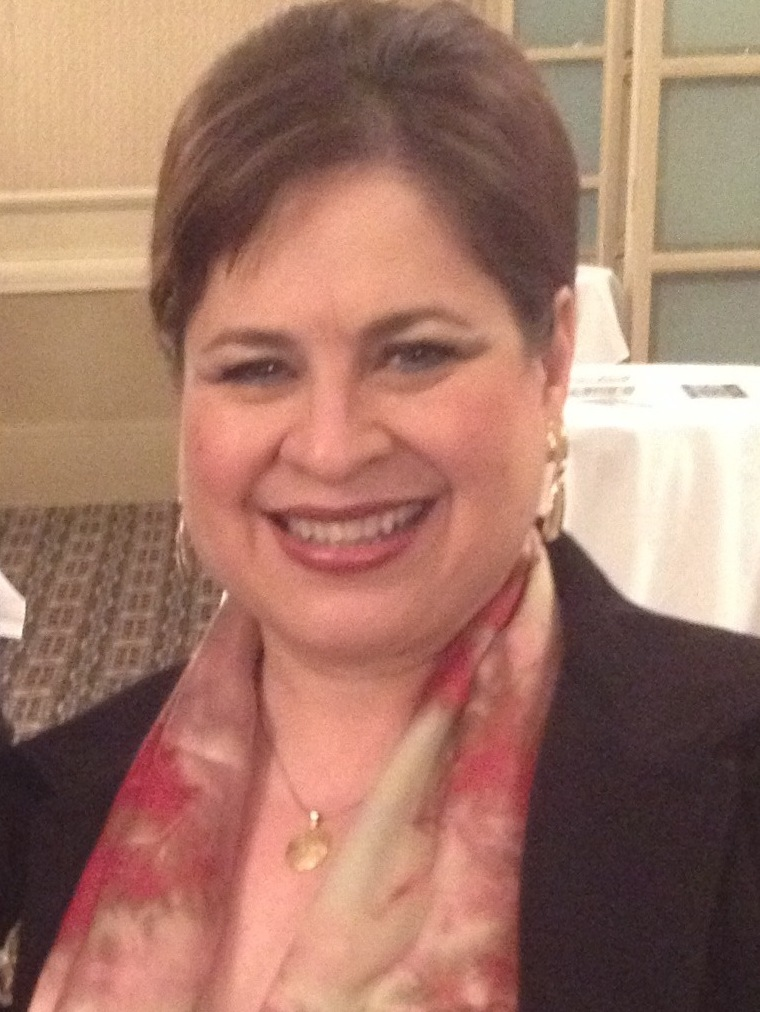

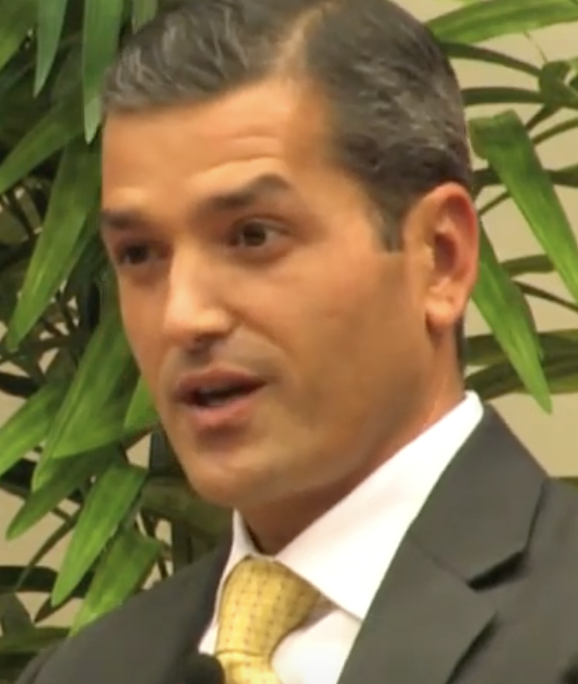

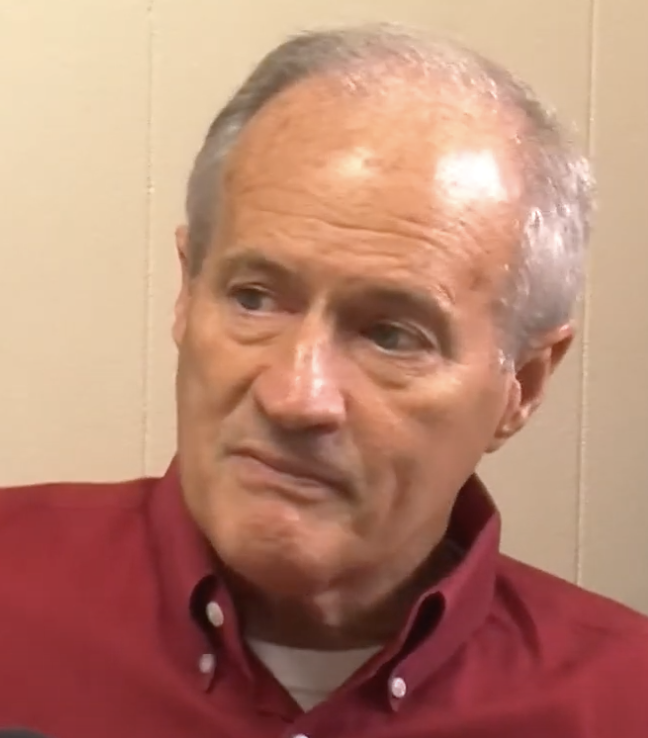
Candidate	Ivy Taylor	Leticia Van de Putte	Mike Villarreal
First round	24,245; 28.40%	25,982; 30.43%	22,246; 26.06%
Runoff	50,662; 51.70%	47,331; 48.30%	Eliminated
Candidate	Tommy Adkisson
First round	8,344; 9.77%
Runoff	Eliminated
Mayor before election
Ivy Taylor (Note: Taylor was serving as interim mayor following the resignation of Julian Castro.)
Elected mayor
Ivy Taylor

On May 9, 2015, the city of San Antonio, Texas, held an election to choose the next Mayor of San Antonio. Interim mayor Ivy Taylor ran for election to a full term and narrowly defeated former state senator Leticia Van de Putte in the runoff election on June 13, 2015, to become the first African American elected to the position. The election was officially nonpartisan.

== Background ==
Julian Castro, who was first elected mayor in the 2009 mayoral election, was selected in 2014 to become the next United States Secretary of Housing and Urban Development. Upon that announcement, State Representative Mike Villarreal immediately announced he would run to succeed Castro in the 2015 election. Once Castro was confirmed by the U.S. Senate, the San Antonio City Council selected Ivy Taylor as interim mayor by a third-round unanimous vote becoming the city's first African-American mayor.

In November 2014, after losing the race to become Lieutenant Governor of Texas, outgoing State Senator Leticia Van de Putte announced she would run for mayor despite earlier reports saying she would not seek the position. Additionally, in spite of earlier promises that Taylor would not run for a full term in the May election, she ultimately entered the race in February 2015.

== Candidates ==
After the deadline to file passed, four candidates (Adkisson, Taylor, Van de Putte and Villarreal) were considered the frontrunners in the race, though none of them were able to poll above fifty percent and avoid a runoff.

=== Declared ===
- Tommy Adkisson, former Bexar County Commissioner
- Cynthia Brehm
- Cynthia Cavazos
- Douglas Emmett
- Michael Idrogo
- Paul Martinez, retired Army major
- Pogo Mochello Reese
- Julie Iris Oldham, perennial candidate
- Gerard Ponce, former Bexar County Court Coordinator and 2014 Republican candidate for Bexar County Judge
- Rhett Smith, perennial candidate and Green Party activist
- Ivy Taylor, Mayor of San Antonio and former city councilwoman
- Leticia Van de Putte, former state senator and Democratic nominee for Lieutenant Governor of Texas in 2014
- Mike Villarreal, former state representative
- Raymond Zavala, community organizer and previous mayoral candidate

=== Endorsements ===
italicized individuals and organizations are post-regular election endorsements

Taylor
- Tommy Adkisson, former Bexar County Commissioner and mayoral candidate
- Mike Gallagher, current City Councilman, District 10
Van de Putte
- Annie's List
- Tommy Calvert, Bexar County Commissioner
- Shirley Gonzales, current City Councilwoman, District 5
- Bill Greehey, Chairman of the Board of NuStar Energy L.P.
- Phil Hardberger, Mayor of San Antonio (2005-2009)
- Gordon Hartman, San Antonio businessman, philanthropist and developer of Morgan's Wonderland
- Ray Lopez, current City Councilman, District 6
- Ruth McClendon, State Representative, District 120
- Jose Menendez, Texas State Senator, District 26
- Harvey Najim, San Antonio businessman and philanthropist
- Howard Peak, Mayor of San Antonio (1997-2001)
- San Antonio Express-News
- San Antonio Police Officers Association
- San Antonio Professional Firefighters Association
- Alan Warrick, current City Councilman, District 2
- Nelson Wolff, Bexar County Judge and Mayor of San Antonio (1991-1995)
Villarreal
- Joaquin Castro, United States Congressman, Texas District 20 (endorsed Van de Putte in runoff)
- Philip Cortez, state representative
- Delicia Herrera, former City Councilwoman, District 6
- James Howard, Board of Trustees member for San Antonio Independent School District
- John Folks, former Superintendent of Northside Independent School District (endorsed Van de Putte in runoff)
- Richard Middleton, former Superintendent of Northeast Independent School District
- Marisa B. Perez, member of Texas State Board of Education
- Carlos Uresti, Texas State Senator (endorsed Van de Putte in runoff)

=== Polling ===
Poll Source	Date(s) administered	Tommy Adkisson	Ivy Taylor	Leticia Van de Putte	Mike Villarreal	Other/ Undecided
Anderson Williams Research	April 29, 2015	17%	24%	29%	18%	11%

== Results ==
=== First round ===
On May 9, 2015, the election for mayor was held. None of the leading candidates received more than 50% of the vote and as a result, a runoff election was scheduled for Saturday, June 13, 2015, between the top two vote getters.

San Antonio Mayor, 2015 Regular election, May 9, 2015
Candidate		Votes	%	±
✓	Leticia Van de Putte	25,982	30.43%	
✓	Ivy Taylor	24,245	28.40%	
	Mike Villarreal	22,246	26.06%	
	Tommy Adkisson	8,344	9.77%	
	Paul Martinez	1,877	2.20%	
	Cynthia Brehm	1,497	1.75%	
	Douglas Emmett	221	0.26%	
	Michael "Commander" Idrogo	221	0.26%	
	Cynthia Cavazos	201	0.24%	
	Raymond Zavala	196	0.23%	
	Rhett Smith	111	0.13%	
	Julie Iris Oldham (Mama Bexar)	103	0.12%	
	Gerard Ponce	97	0.11%	
	Pogo Mochello Reese	29	0.03%	
Turnout		85,370	11.89%*	

* Vote percentage include all of Bexar County with a total of 12,316 either voting in another municipal election or casting no ballot for San Antonio mayor.

=== Runoff ===
More people voted in the runoff election for mayor than did in the regular election on May 9, 2015. Taylor found most of her support from conservatives within the city who typically reside on the north side and from her former city council district on the east side. Meanwhile, Van de Putte performed best on the west and south sides of town.

San Antonio Mayor, 2015 Runoff election June 13, 2015
Candidate		Votes	%	±
✓	Ivy Taylor	50,662	51.70%	
	Leticia Van de Putte	47,331	48.30%	
Turnout		97,993	14.12%	
