= Roberto Alonzo =

American politician (born 1956)

Beto Alonzo
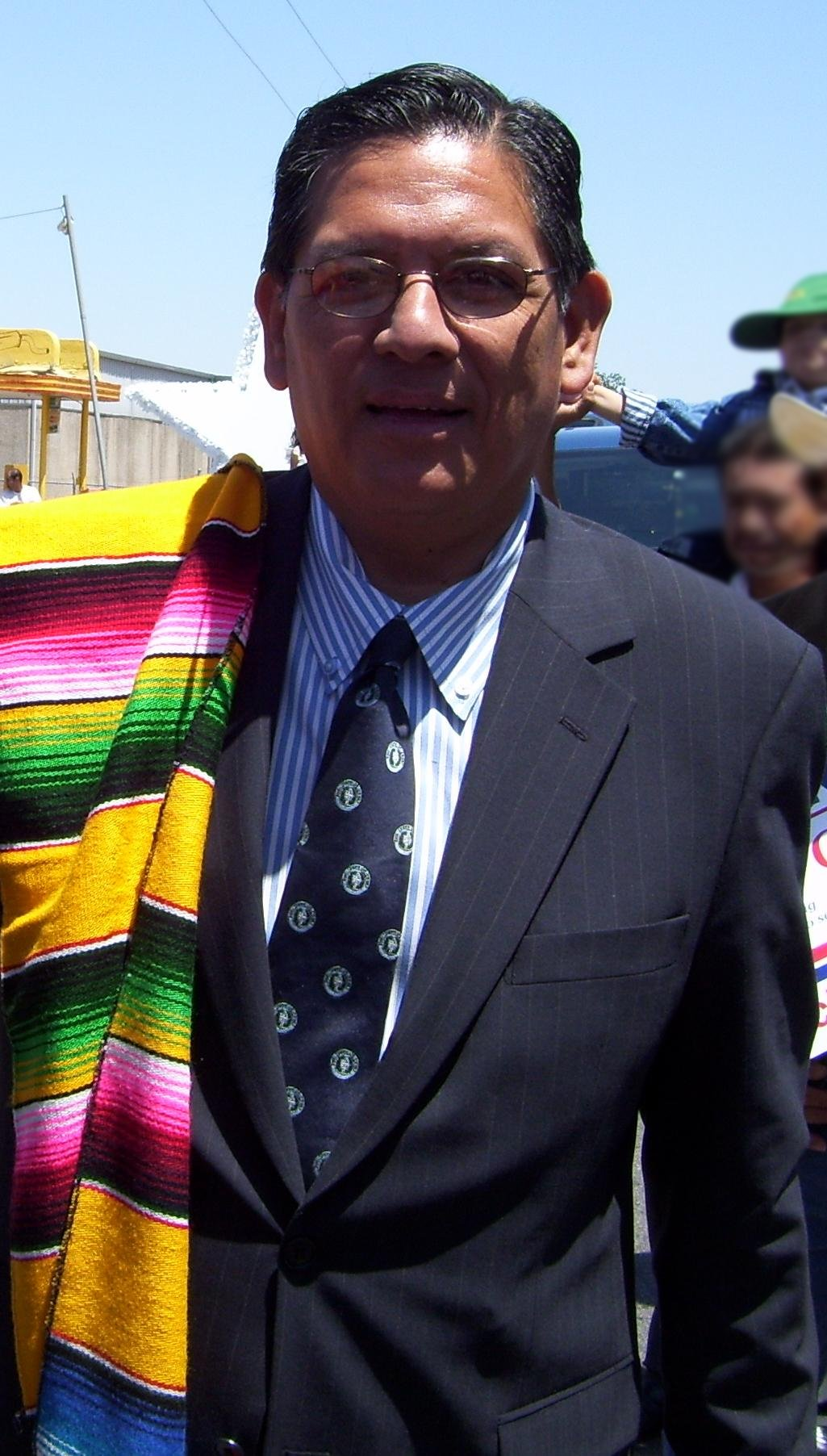

Member of the Texas House of Representatives from the 104th district
- In office January 14, 2003 – January 8, 2019
- Preceded by: Domingo García
- Succeeded by: Jessica González
- In office January 12, 1993 – January 14, 1997
- Preceded by: Glenn Repp
- Succeeded by: Domingo García

Personal details
- Born: December 25, 1956 (age 69) Crystal City, Texas, U.S.
- Party: Democratic
- Spouse: Sylvana
- Education: University of Texas, Austin (BA); Texas Southern University (JD)

Roberto R. Alonzo (born December 25, 1956) is a former Democratic member of the Texas House of Representatives, representing the 104th District from 1993 to 2019. Alonzo was defeated in the Democratic primary on March 6, 2018, by Jessica González.

== Education ==
Alonzo is an alumnus of The University of Texas at Austin and the Thurgood Marshall School of Law at Texas Southern University.

== Political career ==
In 2017, during the 85th Texas Legislature, Representative Alonzo helped lead the fight against Senate Bill 4 by referencing the Chicano bogeyman known as "el cucuy". Rep. Alonzo's use of "el cucuy" attempted to communicate to his Republican colleagues the negative psychological effects legislation such as SB4 would have on immigrant communities.

Representative Alonzo drew the ire of some Dallas residents over a housing dispute. Alonzo ran for Texas Railroad Commissioner in 2020 triggering a runoff for the Democratic Party nomination with Chrysta Castañeda.
