= Texas's 124th House of Representatives district =

American legislative district

Texas's 124th State House of Representatives district
Representative
Josey Garcia; D–San Antonio
- Demographics: 16.2% White; 10.1% Black; 70.8% Hispanic; 3.8% Asian
- Population (2020) • Voting age: 194,508; 143,923

The 124th district of the Texas House of Representatives contains parts of Bexar County. The current representative is Josey Garcia, who was first elected in 2022.

== List of representatives ==
- Ina Minjarez from 2014 to 2022
