= Trey Martinez Fischer =

Texas politician (born 1970)

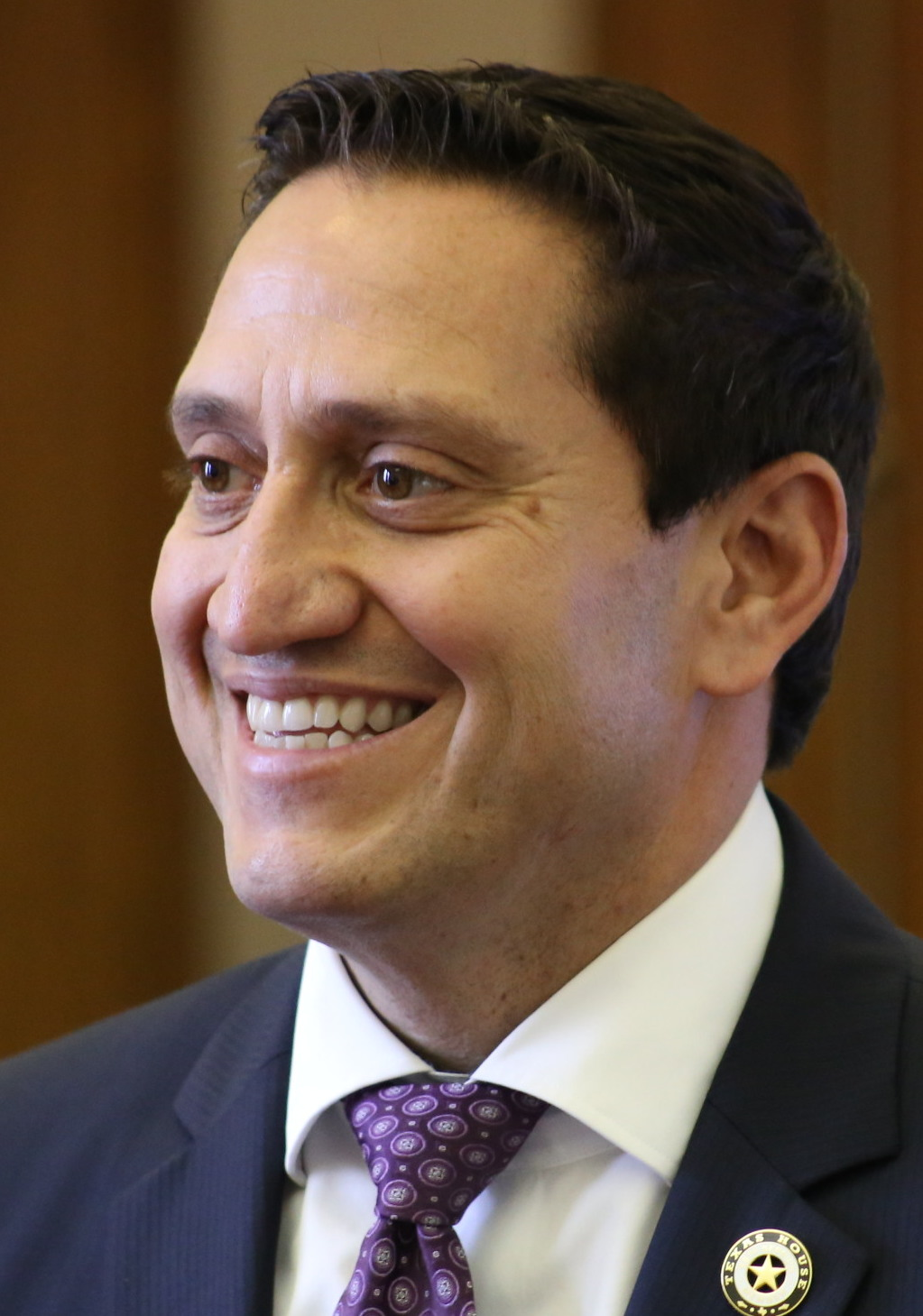

Minority Leader of the Texas House of Representatives
- In office January 10, 2023 – January 14, 2025
- Preceded by: Chris Turner
- Succeeded by: Gene Wu

Member of the Texas House of Representatives from the 116th district
- Incumbent
- Assumed office January 8, 2019
- Preceded by: Diana Arevalo
- In office January 9, 2001 – January 10, 2017
- Preceded by: Leo Alvarado
- Succeeded by: Diana Arevalo

Personal details
- Born: Ferdinand Frank Fischer III; June 5, 1970 (age 56) San Antonio, Texas, U.S.
- Party: Democratic
- Spouse: Elizabeth Provencio
- Children: 2
- Education: University of Texas, San Antonio (BA); Baruch College (MPA); University of Texas, Austin (JD)
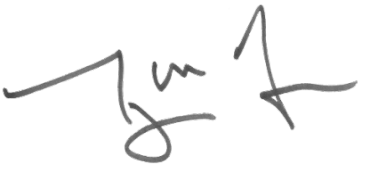
- Signature
- Nickname: TMF

Ferdinand Frank Fischer III (born June 5, 1970), better known as Trey Martinez Fischer, is an American politician. He is a member of the Texas House of Representatives, and has represented the 116th district since 2019, having previously held the seat from 2001 to 2017. He is a member of the Democratic Party.

The Houston Chronicle and the San Francisco Chronicle named him one of the "20 Latino political rising stars of 2012", placing him among those under 55, "who just might change the face of American politics over the next two decades".

Martinez Fischer is the former chairman of the Mexican American Legislative Caucus.

== Early life and education ==
Martinez Fischer was born and raised in San Antonio, Texas. He graduated from Oliver Wendell Holmes High School. He received his Bachelor of Arts from the University of Texas at San Antonio, and in 1994 was selected to study as a National Urban Fellow. He is a graduate of Baruch College of Public Affairs in New York City, and the University of Texas School of Law.

== Legislative career ==
Martinez Fischer was first elected to the seat of District 118 in the Texas House of Representatives in 2000. In 2011, he was the lead Democratic author on HB 3727, the Boeing Bill. As a result of this bill, Air Force One will be refitted and repaired in San Antonio.

He was selected by then House Speaker Joe Straus to sit on the Select Committee on Transparency in State Agency Operations, and the Select Committee on Redistricting during the first called special session of the 83rd Legislature.

In 2014, State Senator Leticia Van de Putte resigned in order to run in the San Antonio Mayoral race. Martinez Fischer ran in the special election to serve out the remainder of her term for Senate District 26 . Martinez Fischer received a plurality of the votes, but came short of the majority needed to win the seat. On February 17, 2015, Martinez Fischer was defeated in the runoff by fellow Democratic House colleague Jose Menendez.

Martinez Fischer challenged and lost again to Menendez for a full Senate term in the Democratic primary on March 1, 2016. Martinez Fischer had to retire from his House seat to run for the Senate and Diana Arevalo, the secretary for the Bexar County Democratic Party, won the Democratic primary for the House seat and as she was unopposed in the general election, succeeded Martinez Fischer in January 2017. In 2018, he unseated Arevalo in the Democratic primary for his former state House seat. He won the subsequent general election over the Republican Fernando Padron, 32,375 votes (70.4 percent) to 13,612 (29.6 percent). Martinez Fischer returned to the House in January 2019.

Heading into the 2023 legislative session, the House Democratic Caucus elected Martinez Fischer to lead the caucus as Minority Leader. He only held the position for a single term and was succeeded by Gene Wu.

He has frequently been acknowledged by Texas Monthly magazine and in 2011 was named "Bull of the Brazos". In 2013 and 2015 he was recognized as one of the magazine's "10 Best Legislators" which described him as a "soldier prepared to do battle but ready to make peace". In 2023, the magazine called him one of the "10 Worst Legislators".

=== Disparaging remarks ===
On June 27, 2014, while speaking at the Texas Democratic Convention, Martinez Fischer attacked the Republican Party, saying "GOP" should stand for "gringos y otros pendejos". His office had also been handing out six Lotería cards to delegates, one depicting Republican gubernatorial candidate Greg Abbott as "El Diablito". Martinez Fischer responded by saying that if he had known Abbott was in attendance, he would have "told him directly to his face."

== Personal life ==
He and his wife, the former Elizabeth Provencio, an attorney and trustee of the San Antonio Water System, are the parents of two daughters.

Texas House of Representatives
Preceded by Chris Turner	Minority Leader of the Texas House of Representatives; 2023–2025	Succeeded by Gene Wu
