= Mike Villarreal =

American politician (born 1971)

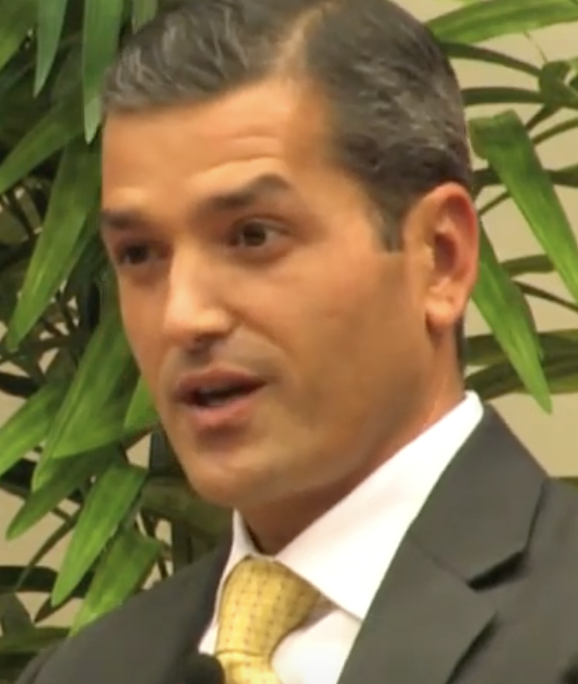

Member of the Texas House of Representatives from the 123rd district
- In office January 13, 2003 – January 15, 2015
- Preceded by: Frank Corte Jr.
- Succeeded by: Diego Bernal

Member of the Texas House of Representatives from the 115th district
- In office February 17, 2000 – January 13, 2003
- Preceded by: Leticia Van de Putte
- Succeeded by: Kenny Marchant

Personal details
- Born: August 19, 1971 (age 55) San Antonio, Texas, U.S.
- Party: Democratic
- Spouse: Jeanne Russell
- Children: Bella, Marcos
- Education: Texas A&M University (BS); Harvard University (MPP); University of Texas, Austin (PhD)
- Profession: Politician

Michael Villarreal (born August 19, 1971) is an American data scientist, entrepreneur, and former Texas state representative who served San Antonio's downtown and surrounding neighborhoods from 2000 to 2015. He currently works as Principal Data Scientist and equity partner at CML Insight, a software development company, and co-founded FairAppraisalNow.com, which uses artificial intelligence to help homeowners appeal property tax appraisals.

In February 2025, he launched a campaign for the San Antonio ISD school board to help improve the academic and personal development of children within this urban school district.

== Early life and education ==
A native of San Antonio, Texas, Villarreal became the first in his family to graduate from college when he earned degrees in economics and mathematics from Texas A&M University in 1993. He subsequently completed a master's degree in public policy from Harvard Kennedy School in 1996 and a PhD in public policy from the University of Texas at Austin's LBJ School of Public Affairs in 2018, where he specialized in quantitative methods and education policy evaluation.

== Political career ==
Villarreal represented San Antonio in the Texas House of Representatives for fifteen years as a Democrat (2000-2015). During his tenure, he served on several key committees, including Public Education, Appropriations, and Ways and Means, and chaired the Financial Services Committee.

His legislative accomplishments include establishing Texas' statewide education and workforce data system, defeating regressive tax proposals, and championing initiatives in early education, student financial aid, and workforce development. Villarreal was the first legislator from Bexar County to be named to Texas Monthly's "Best Legislators" list, an honor he received twice.

Villarreal resigned his seat in the State House in January 2015 to run for Mayor of San Antonio in the 2015 mayoral election. Villarreal came in third and did not qualify for the runoff.

== Academic and public service career ==
After leaving the legislature, Villarreal founded and directed the Urban Education Institute at the University of Texas at San Antonio (2018-2022), where he led research on policies and programs affecting educational achievement in marginalized communities. His research has particularly focused on early education, college readiness, the impact of dual credit coursework, financial aid programs, and the effects of school mobility on educational achievement in Bexar County.

From 2022 to 2024, Villarreal served as Assistant Commissioner at the Texas Higher Education Coordinating Board, where his team transformed education and workforce data into actionable insights to inform policy decisions.

== Entrepreneurship ==
Villarreal currently serves as Principal Data Scientist and equity partner at CML Insight, an AI software development company which focuses on water conservation, water infrastructure management, and student success in higher education. With his partners, he also founded FairAppraisalNow.com, a technology company that leverages artificial intelligence to assist homeowners in appealing property tax appraisals.

== Personal life ==
Villarreal and his wife, Jeanne Russell, raised two children who graduated from San Antonio Independent School District schools and are now attending college.

Preceded by Frank Corte Jr.	Member of the Texas House of Representatives from District 123 (San Antonio); 2003-2015	Succeeded by Diego Bernal
Preceded by Leticia Van de Putte	Member of the Texas House of Representatives from District 115 (San Antonio); 1999–2003	Succeeded by Kenny Marchant
