= Josey Garcia =

American politician (born 1977)

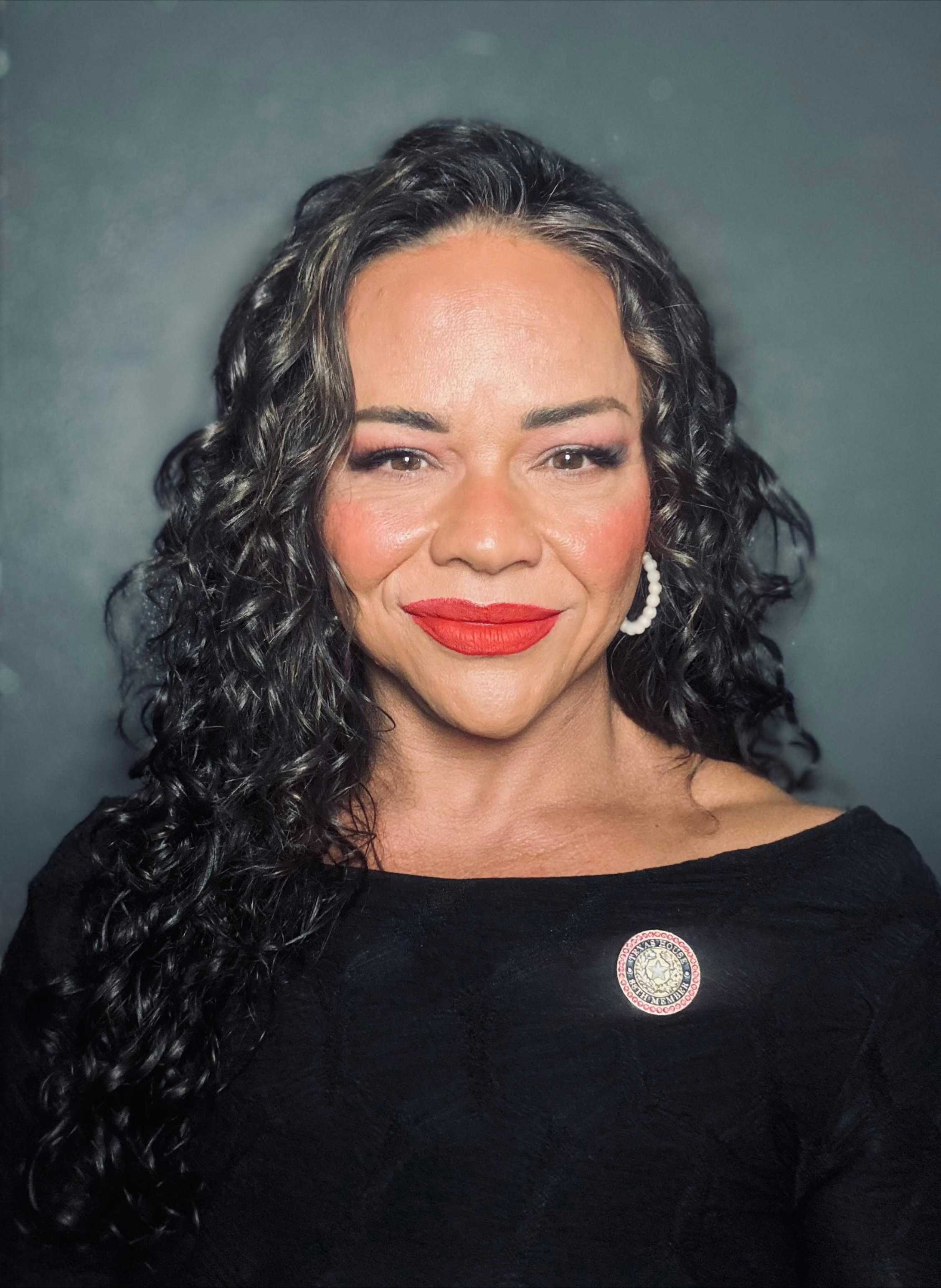

Member of the Texas House of Representatives from the 124th district
- Incumbent
- Assumed office January 10, 2023
- Preceded by: Ina Minjarez

Personal details
- Born: July 16, 1977 (age 49)
- Party: Democratic
- Education: Northwest Vista College
- Profession: Community advocate Dental technician
- Website: Campaign website

Josey Garcia is an American politician serving in the Texas House of Representatives, representing Texas's 124th House of Representatives district since 2023. She is a member of the Democratic Party, and serves as the first active-duty woman veteran to serve in the Texas House of Representatives.

== Biography ==
Garcia was born on July 16, 1977 and spent her early years in the foster care system, attending 13 different schools before high school. At age 16, she enlisted in the U.S. Air Force through the Delayed Enlistment Program and after graduating from high school, joined the Air Force. At nineteen years of age, she adopted her three year old brother.

In 2020, Garcia co-founded Uniting America Outreach, a non-profit organization based in San Antonio that delivers food and supplies to people in need. During Winter Storm Uri in 2021, Uniting America Outreach delivered over 9,000 meals to vulnerable San Antonio residents. The organization raised over $50,000 for food, clothing, and hygiene products to be delivered to Ciudad Acuña, Mexico during the crisis at the border in 2022.

== Military career ==
In 1996, she entered the service at Lackland Air Force Base in San Antonio, Texas after graduating high school. She served in deployments to Cameroon, and Iraq, where she served in Operation Iraqi Freedom as an advisor to the Iraqi military overseeing medical personnel as well as creating a tracking system for treating soldiers. She also served as an Air Force dental technician. She later served at Ramstein Air Base, Germany, before retiring after twenty years of service in 2014.

== Texas House of Representatives ==
Garcia was first elected to the Texas House of Representatives in 2022, becoming the legislature's first woman veteran. During her two terms in a Republican-majority legislature, she has served as lead author of multiple bills, 3 of which became law; HB 2248, The Vanessa Guillen Day Act, which designated September 30 as Vanessa Guillen Day in the State of Texas to honor her service, and break the silence on military sexual violence, HB 4333, the extension of a family violence pretrial diversion pilot program in Bexar County, and HB 1965, which requires the Texas Veteran's Commission to conduct a study in collaboration with the Health and Human Services Commission on strategies to improve access to mental health services through the Texas Veterans Commission Military Veteran Peer Network. In 2025, Garcia joined fellow Texas House Democrats in denying quorum during a special legislative session in protest of the proposed mid-decade congressional redistricting plans.

=== First term (2022–2023) ===
In 2022, incumbent Democratic Representative Ina Minjarez announced her decision to run for Bexar County judge. Garcia won the Democratic Primary for the open seat and faced Republican Johnny Arredondo in the general election. She won the election with 67% of the vote. Garcia was voted "Freshman of the Year" by members of the House Democratic Caucus for her accomplishments in the 88th Legislative Session in 2023.

During the 88th Texas Legislature Garcia authored 39 and joint-authored 175 bills. Of these, 30 were signed into law, including:

- The Vanessa Guillen Day Act, which designated September 30 as Vanessa Guillen Day in the State of Texas to honor her service, and break the silence on military sexual violence.
- HB 4333 which ensured that the Reflejo Court in Bexar County, which allows first-time offenders of domestic violence who also struggle with substance abuse to enter a rigorous program which promotes accountability and treatment, can continue its work for four additional years.
- SB 1930 which increased the standards for courts, attorneys, and child advocates of foster children to ensure that each placement is meeting the needs of the individual child and that fewer children are being placed in facilities that have higher rates of abuse.
- SB 252 which allows veterans who are legal permanent residents to serve as peace officers in their communities.

=== Second Term (2024–2025) ===
Garica was reelected in 2024, defeating Sylvia Soto with 61.5% of the vote. In 2025, Garcia joined fellow Texas House Democrats in denying quorum during a special legislative session in protest of proposed congressional redistricting plans. The action drew national attention and resulted in financial penalties (over $8,000) against participating lawmakers. She publicly defended her participation, citing concerns over voting rights and representation.

In the 89th Texas Legislature, Garcia serves on House Committees on Energy Resources, Natural Resources, Redistricting, and the Select Committee on Congressional Redistricting. She authored 38 and joint-authored 33 bills including:

- HB 1965 which requires the Texas Veteran's Commission to conduct a study in collaboration with the Health and Human Services Commission on strategies to improve access to mental health services through TVC's Military Veteran Peer Network.
- HB 20 establishes the Applied Sciences Pathway Program, a new initiative within the Texas Education Code aimed at preparing high school students for in-demand technical careers through dual enrollment. Under the program, high school juniors and seniors will have the opportunity to concurrently earn both a high school diploma and an industry-recognized certificate from a partnering institution of higher education.

== Political positions ==
=== Veterans and military affairs ===
Garcia is the first woman veteran in the Texas House of Representatives and has made veterans’ issues a focus of her legislative career. She serves as the chair for the Veteran and Military Affair's Task Force at the National Hispanic Caucus of State Legislators, leading efforts to advance policies that support veterans and military families. Her work focuses on preventing and addressing homelessness, workforce integration, expanding access to veterans' benefits and healthcare, promoting equal educational opportunities, and providing support to the families of service members who were wounded or killed in action.

She authored legislation establishing Vanessa Guillén Day in Texas and has supported research into treatments for post-traumatic stress disorder (PTSD), including Ibogaine therapy for veterans.

=== Child welfare ===
Garcia is a leading advocate for foster children and survivors of abuse in Texas, drawing on her own experience as a former foster youth. She has co-authored legislation to strengthen Texas' child welfare system, including measures that assist young adults aging out of foster care, increase oversight of residential treatment facilities, and strengthen CPS procedures.

Garcia has also authored legislation to strengthen child-care safety and accountability. Her measures have enhanced employment screening requirements, improved safety training, and evaluated standards for residential child-care providers. Senate Bill 1469 required child-care facilities to obtain specified information before hiring employees, while Senate Bill 593 required an independent assessment of state regulations, minimum standards, and contract requirements governing certain residential child-care providers.

=== LGBTQ rights ===
Garcia has supported legislation protecting LGBTQ Texans from discrimination and has advocated for equal treatment under the law. As Secretary of the Texas House LGBTQ Caucus, she has advocated expanding civil rights protections and ensuring that LGBTQ youth have access to supportive resources.

== Awards and Recognition ==
- 2023 - Legislative Champion Award (Planned Parenthood Texas Votes)
- 2023 - Public Education Champion Award (Raise Your Hand Texas)
- 2024 - Champion for Children Award (Texas PTA)
- 2026 - Woman Veteran of the Year Award - Texas Veterans of Foreign Wars District 20

== Personal life ==
Garcia is married to Ramon Alberto Salcedo, an Army veteran who served in both Operation Iraqi Freedom, Iraq and Operation Enduring Freedom, Afghanistan, where he was awarded a Purple Heart when he was shot during a combat mission. Their blended family includes eight children including her brother whom she adopted at three years old when she was nineteen years old. She is openly bisexual.
