= Jessica González (politician) =

Texas Democratic politician

Member of the Texas House of Representatives from the 104th district
- Incumbent
- Assumed office January 8, 2019
- Preceded by: Roberto Alonzo

Personal details
- Born: December 25, 1980 (age 45) Dallas, Texas, U.S.
- Party: Democratic
- Spouse: Angela Hale (m. 2021)
- Education: University of Texas at Arlington (BA); Western Michigan University (JD)
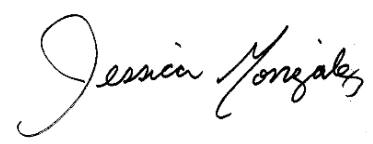
- Signature

Jessica Araceli González (born December 25, 1980) is an American politician serving as a member of the Texas House of Representatives for the 104th district, first elected in the November 2018 general election. In the 89th Legislature, González served on the House Committees on Insurance, Judiciary & Civil Jurisprudence (and its Subcommittee on Family & Fiduciary Relationships), and Local and Consent Calendars. She also serves as Chair of the Texas House LGBTQ Caucus.

She practices personal injury law in Dallas, Texas.

== Early life and education ==
González was born and raised in Dallas. A Duncanville High School graduate, she received her Bachelor of Arts in Criminology and Criminal Justice from the University of Texas at Arlington. She later attended Western Michigan University Cooley Law School, where she received her Juris Doctor and graduated cum laude.

== Career ==
Prior to serving in the Texas Legislature, González was chosen to be a Congressional Hispanic Caucus Institute (CHCI) Law Graduate Fellow, was a legislative assistant for Congresswoman Karen Bass and participated in the White House Internship Program. She was also the Nevada Voter Protection Director for Barack Obama's 2012 presidential reelection campaign.

=== Texas Legislature ===
==== First Term (2019 - 2020) ====
Rep. González with her friend and Dallas County Democratic Party Precinct Chair, the late Hon. Sylvia Collins.

González assumed office on January 8, 2019. She defeated Democratic incumbent Roberto Alonzo in the Democratic primary election 62.5% to 37.5%.

The Dallas Morning News endorsed González, writing "We believe her smarts and dedication offer a fresh start and more promise for the residents of the district than an ineffectual incumbent who is often unreachable and unresponsive."

González authored legislation in the 86th legislative session focused on reforming our criminal justice system, expanding voting rights, and fighting for affordable housing. González passed one bill allowing the redevelopment of property in Oak Cliff owned by Oak Farms Dairy. In addition, she fought for an amendment that would prohibit natural gas companies from passing down the cost of exorbitant "golden parachute" severance packages for executives. The amendment ultimately passed after Senator Royce West picked it up in the Senate.

González served on the House Committee on Criminal Jurisprudence and the House Committee on Urban Affairs. In addition, she was the co-founder of the Texas Criminal Justice Reform Caucus, joined the Mexican American Legislative Caucus, Texas Women's Health Caucus, and the Texas Veterans Caucus. In 2019, she led a redistricting panel at the MAP Conference.

She also served as Chair of the Texas House LGBTQ Caucus and the vice chair of the National Hispanic Caucus of State Legislators' Human and Civil Rights Task Force. González was also a co-founder of the Texas House LGBTQ Caucus during the 86th legislative session. González was a vocal advocate against SB 1978, also known as the "Save-Chick-Fill-A Bill". She said, "As the vice-chair of the House LGBTQ caucus, I will continue to fight against any legislation that attacks Texans for who they love or how they identify."

==== Second Term (2021 - 2022) ====
Rep. Jessica González, then Vice Chair of the Texas House Elections Committee, during a committee hearing on Republican voter suppression legislation that made national news in 2021.

In 2021, Rep. Gonzalez spoke at a press conference organized by the Texas Democratic Party, moments before voter suppression legislation was debated in the Texas House of Representatives.

The 87th Texas Legislature was Rep. González's highest-profile stretch in public service. On the heels of the 2020 United States Presidential Election, and the subsequent attacks on the United States Capitol on January 6, 2021, González was thrown into the middle of the Republican Party's legislative and political efforts to fundamentally reshape American democracy. On February 4, 2021, González was appointed by then Texas House Speaker Dade Phelan to serve as Vice Chair of the Texas House Elections Committee. Weeks later, she made national headlines by leading a vocal and unified Democratic opposition against House Bill 6 and Senate Bill 7, in the Elections Committee and months later when the bill was debated on the House floor. Her advocacy and leadership led to a New York Times profile, which published on May 14, 2021.

After months of national news outlets covering Rep. González and her fellow Democrats on the Elections Committee, on May 30, the deadline to pass Senate Bills on third reading, all 67 members of the Texas House Democratic Caucus walked off the floor of the House of Representatives to prohibit further consideration of the bill. This maneuver killed the legislation during that legislative session, and as a result, Governor Greg Abbott issued a proclamation that detailed the first called special session of 2021. Democrats would withhold quorum for the entirety of the first special session, even after arrest warrants were issued by Speaker Dade Phelan.

Rep. González with Texas House Democrats, during a press conference following the first Texas Democratic walk out of 2021, outside Mt. Zion Baptist Church in Austin. Photo by Miguel Gutierrez Jr, Texas Tribune.

The second special session was called to order on August 6, and Democrats denied quorum until August 19. The walkout lasted 38 days, which up to that point, was the second longest sustained denial of quorum in American history.

For González, the end of the 87th legislature was spent fighting against the final version of the voter suppression bill, an abortion ban after six weeks, and LGBTQIA+ rights.

==== Third Term (2023 - 2024) ====
The 88th Texas Legislature brought personal legislative success for González, as she passed five of her bills out of the House of Representatives and to the Senate. Though they all died in the Senate, this session showed that she had earned the respect of influential committee chairs and House leaders.

Rep. Jessica González, Rep. Ana Maria Rodriguez Ramos (far left), Rep. Gina Hinojosa (left), and Rep. Christina Morales (right) while in Chicago for the 2024 Democratic National Convention.

González was appointed to serve on the House Committee on Business & Industry, and the Committee on Urban Affairs. She continued to serve in the Texas Women's Health Caucus, Mexican American Legislative Caucus, and served as chair of National Hispanic Caucus of State Legislators' (NHCSL) Human and Civil Rights Task Force.

Rep. Gonzalez participates in an interview on NBC 5's Lone Star Politics.

Near the end of the term in 2024, González was elected unanimously to serve as Chair of the Texas House LGBTQ Caucus. Representative Venton Jones of Dallas' House District 100 was elected to serve as Vice Chair.

==== Fourth Term (2025 - 2026) ====
Rep. Gonzalez and Congresswoman Julie Johnson, the first openly LGBTQ+ member of Congress from the southern United States.

The 89th Texas Legislature gaveled in on the heels of President Donald Trump's victory during the 2024 presidential election over Vice President Kamala Harris. This election produced major gains for Republicans in the Rio Grande Valley and Southwest Texas, and saw Senator Ted Cruz sail to an easy victory statewide. During the campaign, the airwaves were full of anti-trans campaign advertisements - at least $11 million worth from Cruz and his supporters. This new political advertising and messaging environment previewed what lied ahead for the legislative session, which began on January 14, 2025.

The Texas House LGBTQ Caucus, led by newly-elected Chair González, worked closely with equality-focused organizations to kill 94% of over 200 anti-LGBTQ+ bills that were filed. This statistic definitively marked the 89th session as the most anti-LGBTQ+ legislative session in Texas history.

Rep. González and Dallas City Councilmember Laura Cadena, during the 2026 Democratic Primary Election.

In 2025, González was appointed to serve on the Insurance committee, the Judiciary and Civil Jurisprudence committee, its Family and Fiduciary Relationship subcommittee, and the Local and Consent Resolutions committee - the first time in her legislative career when she had been appointed to four committees. In April, González passed HB 1203, her priority food insecurity bill, and sent it to the Senate, where it was never referred to committee.

Rep. Jessica González on the Texas House floor, 2025.

Of the amendments Rep. González filed during the regular session, over 50% were amendments intended to mitigate harm against or advance justice for LGBTQ+ Texans.

During third reading of House Bill 2070, González filed and passed an amendment that ensured persons found abusing or grooming children in a church or religious facility would be added to Texas' Central Child Abuse or Neglect Registry.

Rep. González protesting Texas' redistricting legislation while breaking quorum in Chicago.

Rep. Gonzalez speaks at Pride Flag Raising at Dallas City Hall, 2026.

During the first called special session of the 89th Legislature, Governor Abbott's call included mid-decade redistricting, intended to deprive communities of color of their representation in Congress and inequitably shift the electoral map in favor of Republican candidates who were up for reelection. González joined her fellow Democratic members by traveling to Chicago, in an effort to deny quorum to Republicans. While in Chicago, Speaker Dustin Burrows issued arrest warrants, while Abbott and Attorney General Ken Paxton filed court petitions to remove González and twelve other colleagues from office. This effort was ultimately rejected by the Republican-controlled Texas Supreme Court.

When the walkout ultimately ended, Abbott called a second special session, and added Senate Bill 8, known as the discriminatory, anti-trans "Bathroom Ban", to the call. Organizing opposition to SB 8 became González's primary focus, though ultimately it passed.

"Texans should not have to enter a public building in fear of being discriminated against because of how they look. We urge the courts to strike down this dangerous law, and will continue to stand against these attempts to alienate transgender Texans and ensure the safety of all individuals."

== Awards & Recognitions ==
Rep. Jessica González is accepting the Matt Garcia Public Service Award from the Mexican American Legal Defense Fund (MALDEF), 2021.

After a year of leading Texas Democrats' fight against voter suppression legislation at the state level, and bringing national awareness to their cause, González was awarded the 2021 "Bull of the Brazos" Award by Texas Monthly Magazine. Later that year, González received the "Matt Garcia Public Service Award" from the Mexican American Legal Defense Fund (MALDEF).

In recognition of her year of exceptional public service, Rep. González was honored with the 2022 USA TODAY Texas Woman of the Year award.

In 2024, before she was elected to serve as Chair of the Texas House LGBTQ Caucus, González was honored with the "Profile in Courage" Award by Equality Texas.

== Personal life ==
González married Angela Hale in 2021.
