= Harvey Najim =

American businessman

Harvey Najim (born 16 July 1940) is an American businessman and philanthropist. Following a 13-year tenure at IBM, he founded Sirius Computer Solutions (fka. Star Data Systems). Using the proceeds from a merger with Thoma Bravo in November of 2006, he founded the Najim Charitable Foundation. Both Najim's and the Foundation's contributions are primarily directed towards K-12 and post-secondary educational institutions.

== Early life ==
Najim was born on 16 July 1940 in Springfield, Illinois. His father co-owned the Lincoln Candy Company. Najim graduated from the University of Wichita in 1964, proceeding to enlist in the Army Reserve Officer Training Corps, serving as a second lieutenant. Najim became familiar with computers while employed as a data processing officer at Brooke Army Medical Center at Fort Sam Houston, and he joined IBM after leaving the army.

== Career ==
Najim founded the company Star Data Systems in 1980 (renamed to Sirius Computer Solutions in 1991). The company entered partnered with Thoma Bravo in November of 2006, the proceeds of which (approx. $75 million) were used to create the Najim Charitable Foundation. Najim stepped down as CEO of Sirius in 2011, being replaced by Joe Mertens.

== Philanthropy ==
Najim founded the Harvey E. Najim Charitable Foundation in 2006, to which he donated $75 million of his personal funds. This donation placed him among the top 25 American philanthropists in 2007.

In 2015, Najim established a donor-advised fund under the San Antonio Area Foundation which has since provided 220 grants worth $60 million. Separately, Najim has contributed over $25 million to entities such as Haven For Hope, Morgan’s Wonderland, and the Alamo Area Rape Crisis Center.

By 2025, the scope of his foundation had expanded to cover post-secondary education needs, including $5 million to establish The Najim Center for Business Innovation and Career Advancement at the University of Texas at San Antonio, $2 million for the Roadrunners' football program, and $1.25 million to the San Antonio Food Bank.
