= Diego Bernal =

Texas politician (born 1976)

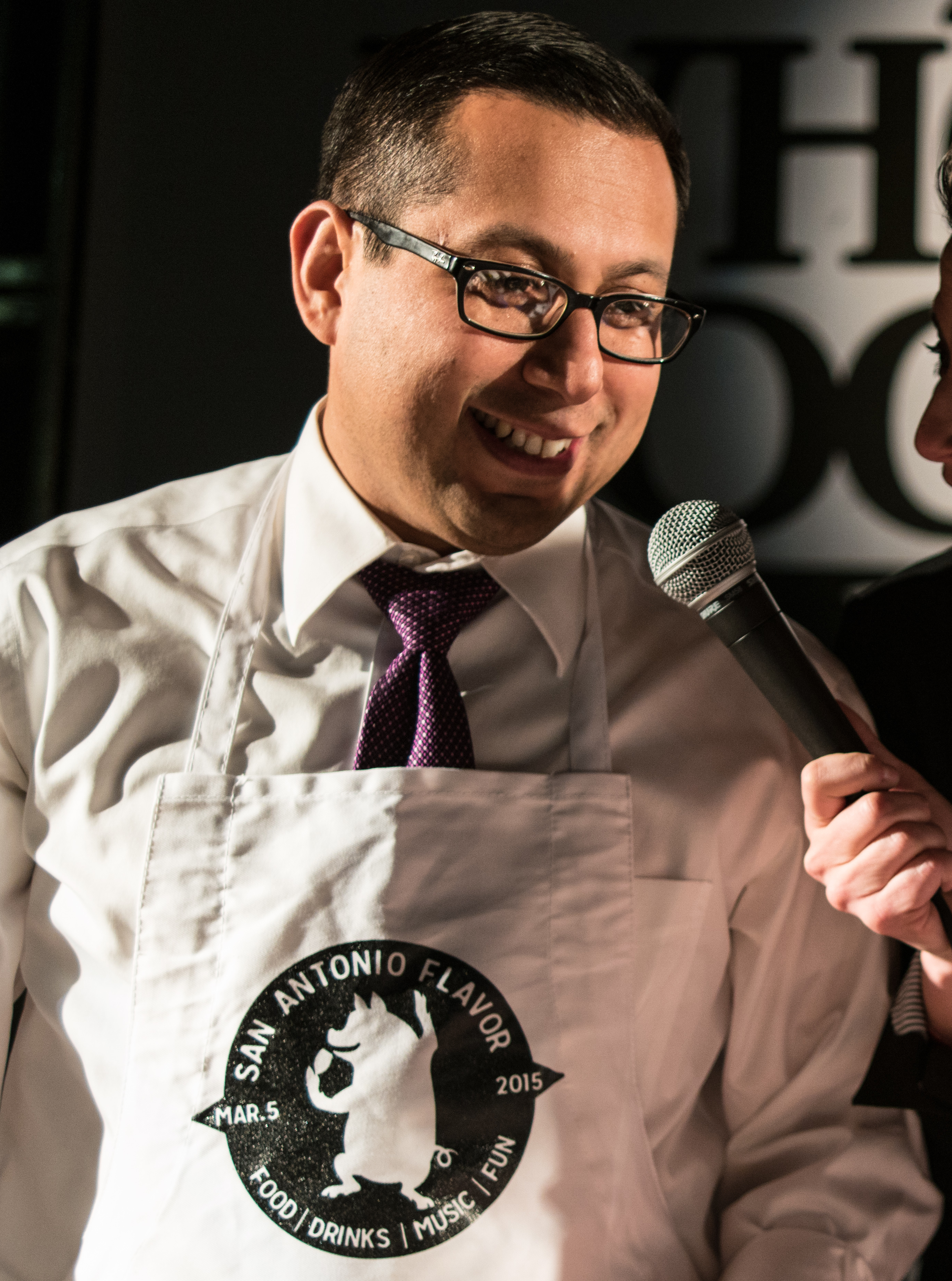

Member of the Texas House of Representatives from the 123rd district
- Incumbent
- Assumed office March 3, 2015
- Preceded by: Mike Villarreal

Personal details
- Born: Diego Manuel Bernal; October 19, 1976 (age 49)
- Party: Democratic
- Education: University of Michigan
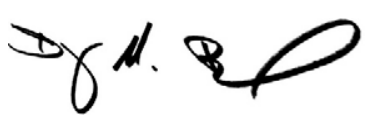
- Signature
- Website: Office website

Diego Manuel Bernal (born October 19, 1976) is a Democratic member of the Texas House of Representatives representing District 123. He was sworn into office on March 3, 2015, after winning a special election on February 17, 2015. Bernal previously served as a member of the San Antonio City Council.

== Sponsored legislation ==
In November 2016, Bernal filed SB 220, which would prohibit openly carrying guns into mental health facilities.
