= Texas's 104th House of Representatives district =

American legislative district

Texas's 104th State House of Representatives district
Representative
Jessica González; D–Dallas
- Demographics: 14.9% White; 12.1% Black; 70.0% Hispanic; 2.6% Asian
- Population (2020) • Voting age: 185,500; 135,335

The 104th district of the Texas House of Representatives represents central and eastern Grand Prairie, and a portion of west Dallas. The current representative is Jessica Gonzalez, who has represented the district since 2019.

Mountain Creek Lake is within the district as is the small enclave city of Cockrell Hill.
