= Diana Arevalo =

American politician (born 1981)

Diana Jennifer Arévalo

Member of the Texas House of Representatives from the 116th district
- In office January 10, 2017 – January 8, 2019
- Preceded by: Trey Martinez Fischer
- Succeeded by: Trey Martinez Fischer

Personal details
- Born: October 27, 1981 (age 44) San Antonio, Texas, U.S.
- Party: Democratic
- Education: University of Texas at San Antonio Our Lady of the Lake University
- Website: Campaign website

Diana Jennifer Arévalo (born October 27, 1981) is an American politician. She was the former Democratic member of the Texas House of Representatives for the 116th district.

== Election history ==
Arévalo ran unopposed in the November 2016 general election after defeating two opponents in the Democratic primary. She served on the Rules and Resolutions, Defense and Veteran's Affairs, and Public Health committees.

In 2018, Arévalo ran for re-election. She was defeated in the Democratic primary by her predecessor, Trey Martinez Fischer, winning 49.4% of the vote compared to Martinez Fischer's 50.6%. She left office on January 8, 2019 and was succeeded by Trey Martinez Fischer.

Texas House of Representatives
Preceded by Trey Martinez Fischer	Texas State Representative for District 116 (Bexar County); 2017–2019	Succeeded by Trey Martinez Fischer
