= Jose Menendez =

American politician (born 1969)

José Menéndez
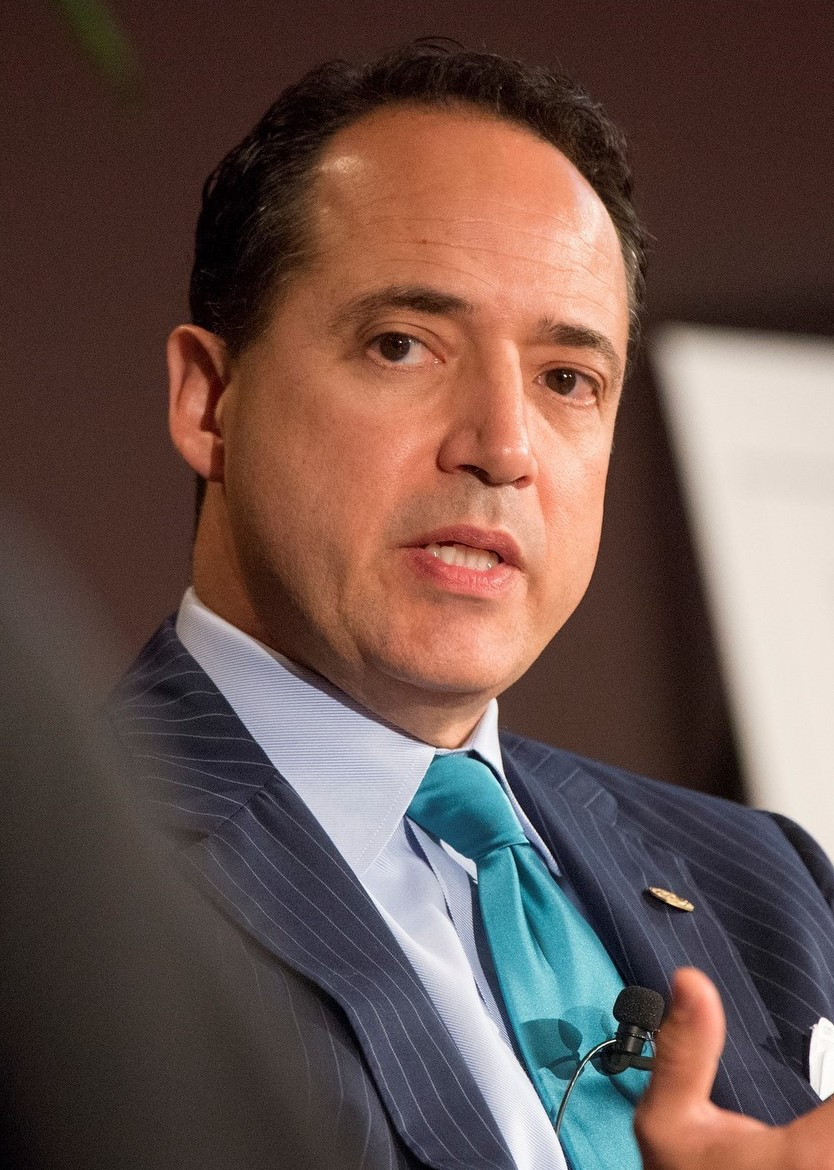
- Menéndez in 2019

Member of the Texas Senate from the 26th district
- Incumbent
- Assumed office March 4, 2015
- Preceded by: Leticia Van de Putte

Member of the Texas House of Representatives from the 124th district
- In office January 9, 2001 – March 3, 2015
- Preceded by: Juan Solis III
- Succeeded by: Ina Minjarez

Member of the San Antonio City Council from the 6th district
- In office 1997–2000

Personal details
- Born: March 11, 1969 (age 57) San Juan, Texas, U.S.
- Party: Democratic
- Spouse: Celia Newman (m. 1995)
- Children: 3
- Education: Southern Methodist University (BBA, BA)
- Website: Office website

José Antonio Menéndez (born March 11, 1969) is an American politician who is a member of the Texas Senate for District 26 and a Democrat. Prior to his service in the Senate he was a member of the Texas House of Representatives for District 124 from 2001 to 2015, he was also a member of the San Antonio City Council for District 6.

== Background ==
José Menéndez was born in San Juan in Hidalgo County in South Texas. He graduated in 1987 from Central Catholic Marianist High School. Four years later, he graduated from Southern Methodist University in University Park, Texas, where he received his Bachelor of Business Administration and a Bachelor of Arts in Latin American Studies. He returned to San Antonio, where he took over his family business in 1991.

== Political career ==
Menéndez was appointed to the San Antonio Zoning Commission for District 6 in 1994. In 1997, after a heated campaign, he was elected to the District 6 seat on the city council.

In 1999, Menéndez was re-elected to the council with more than 84 percent of the vote. He served on the Small Business, International, and Ethics committees. He also was the chairman of the City's Community Revitalization Action Group (CRAG). In 2000, term-limited on the council, he ran for the state House of Representatives and was sworn into his first term in 2001. As a representative, Menendez headed the House Committee on Defense and Veterans' Affairs, which put him in contact with thousands of Texas veterans and provided a basis for his successful run thereafter for the Texas Senate.

In 2014, State Senator Leticia Van de Putte resigned to run against the short-term incumbent, Ivy Taylor, for mayor of San Antonio, Texas. Menéndez entered the race against fellow Democratic State Representative Trey Martinez Fischer to succeed to finish the term. Martinez Fischer had received a plurality of the votes, but came short of the majority needed to win the seat. In the run off on February 17, 2015, Menendez was able to secure almost 60% of the vote.

Menéndez won election to a full term in the state Senate in the Democratic primary on March 1, 2016, when he again defeated Trey Martinez Fischer. A number of lobbyists and political action committees which had supported Martinez Fischer switched allegiance to the incumbent Menéndez, whose campaign chairman, Colin Strother, worked in numerous successful campaigns; among them U.S. Representative Henry Cuellar of Laredo in Texas's 28th congressional district. Menéndez faced no Republican opposition in his heavily Democratic district.

Menéndez (second from right) and other Texas Democratic lawmakers meet at the Massachusetts State House with Mass. Gov. Maura Healey and Mass. Sec. of the Commonwealth William F. Galvin during the 2025 Texas walkout.

In a debate before the American Association of Retired Persons in San Antonio, Menéndez noted that Martinez Fischer would have become dean of the Bexar County state House delegation had he remained in the House. Martinez Fischer did assume the Bexar County legislative dean's position on February 1, 2016, with the retirement of colleague Ruth McClendon. "Trey did a great job in the House killing many, many bills... We have differences of opinion, we debate. We're passionate about it, but we're also respectful about it," said Menéndez.

Buoyed by the power of incumbency for just a year, Menéndez defeated Martinez Fischer, 31,046 votes (59.2 percent) to 21,383 (40.8 percent).

=== Texas Senate ===
On the last day of the regular legislative session in 2017, Menéndez used a filibuster to kill a bill supported by Republican Donna Campbell of New Braunfels, which would have made it more difficult for municipalities to annex surrounding territory.

Menéndez was the author of "David's Law" which classified cyberbullying as a misdemeanor and allowed courts to issue subpoenas to curb the anonymous harassment of minors on the internet. The law was named after David Molak, a San Antonio teenager who committed suicide after being harassed and bullied online.

In the 2017 special legislative session, Menéndez spoke against a bill to increase the penalty from misdemeanor to felony when one is convicted of intentionally submitting false information on a mail-in ballot application. Menéndez argued that such legislation would lead to "unintended consequences." Kelly Hancock, a Republican senator from North Richland Hills in Tarrant County, argued that the legislation is needed because mail-in voting has been linked to illegal voting and election fraud.

During the impeachment trial of Attorney General Ken Paxton, Paxton's attorneys made a motion to disqualify Menéndez and two other senators from serving as jurors in the case, claiming they had shown bias and could not be impartial. Lieutenant Governor Dan Patrick dismissed this motion.

== Personal life ==
Menéndez and his wife, Cehlia Newman-Menéndez, have three children: Dominic Newman-Menéndez, Victoria Newman-Menéndez, and Austin Newman-Menéndez. Menéndez and his family reside in San Antonio and Austin, Texas.
