= Ina Minjarez =

Democratic Texas legislature

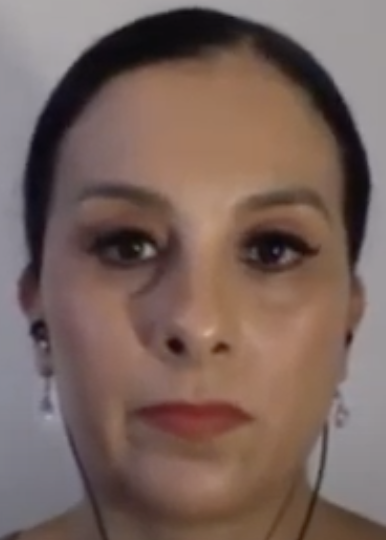

Member of the Texas House of Representatives from the 124th district
- In office April 30, 2015 – January 10, 2023
- Preceded by: Jose Menendez
- Succeeded by: Josey Garcia

Personal details
- Born: March 27, 1975 (age 51) El Paso, Texas, U.S.
- Party: Democratic
- Spouse: Leo Gomez
- Education: University of Notre Dame; St. Mary's University
- Occupation: Lawyer
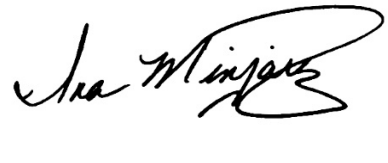
- Signature

Ina Marie Minjarez (born March 27, 1975) is a lawyer and a former Democratic member of the Texas House of Representatives representing District 124 in San Antonio, Texas. She was sworn into office on April 30, 2015, after winning a special election on April 21. She served as Assistant District Attorney for Bexar County from 2000 through 2006.

Minjarez handily won election to her second full term in the general election held on November 6, 2018. With 31,674 votes (67.6 percent), she topped her conservative Republican challenger, Johnny S. Arredondo, who finished with 15,151 votes (32.4 percent). Arredondo formerly ran unsuccessfully for the San Antonio City Council. He carried the support of Governor Greg Abbott in the race against Minjarez.

== Sponsored legislation ==
In 2016, Minjarez sponsored "David's Law", legislation aimed at preventing cyberbullying.

Texas House of Representatives
Preceded by Jose Menendez	Texas State Representative for District 116 (Bexar County); 2015–	Succeeded by Incumbent
