= Leticia Van de Putte =

Texas politician

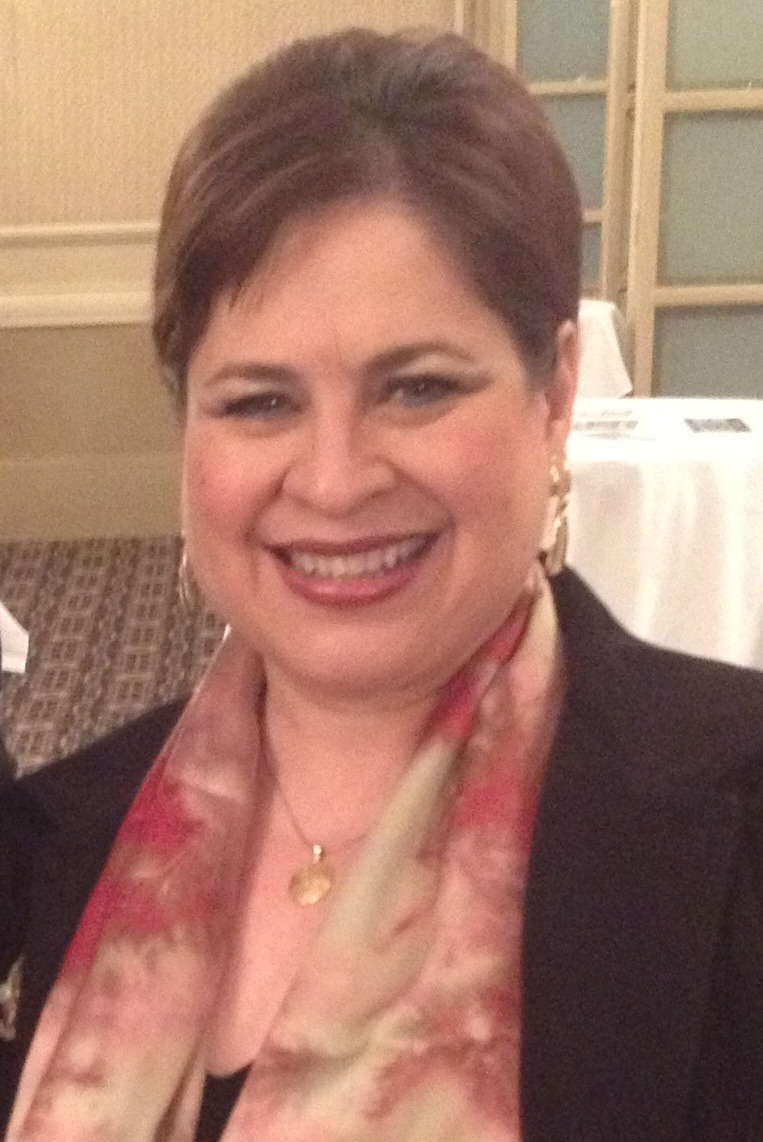

Member of the Texas Senate from the 26th district
- In office November 10, 1999 – March 4, 2015
- Preceded by: Gregory Luna
- Succeeded by: Jose Menendez

President of the National Conference of State Legislatures
- In office 2006–2007
- Preceded by: Steve Rauschenberger
- Succeeded by: Donna Stone

Member of the Texas House of Representatives from the 115th district
- In office January 8, 1991 – November 9, 1999
- Preceded by: Orlando Luis Garcia
- Succeeded by: Mike Villarreal

Personal details
- Born: Leticia Rosa Magdalena Aguilar San Miguel; December 6, 1954 (age 71) Tacoma, Washington, U.S.
- Party: Democratic
- Spouse: Pete Van de Putte
- Children: 6
- Education: University of Houston; University of Texas, Austin (BS)
- Website: Campaign website

Leticia Rosa Magdalena Aguilar Van de Putte (née San Miguel; born December 6, 1954) is an American politician from San Antonio, Texas. She represented the 26th District in the Texas Senate from 1999–2015. From 1991 to 1999, Van de Putte was a member of the Texas House of Representatives. In 2014, she was the Democratic nominee for lieutenant governor but lost the general election, 58-39 percent, to her Republican senatorial colleague, Dan Patrick of Houston. Following that defeat, she then resigned from the Texas Senate to run in the 2015 election for mayor of San Antonio, which she narrowly lost to Ivy Taylor, 52-48 percent.

== Personal life ==
Van de Putte was born on December 6, 1954, in Tacoma, Washington, the oldest of five children to Daniel and Isabel San Miguel, a sixth-generation Tejano family. Her father was stationed at Fort Lewis when she was born. The family returned to San Antonio, where she was subsequently reared. Van de Putte has six children and six grandchildren with her husband, Pete Van de Putte. She belongs to the Daughters of the Republic of Texas.

== Education and career as pharmacist ==
Van de Putte is a 1973 graduate of Thomas Jefferson High School in San Antonio. She was accepted to the University of Houston pharmacy program, following in the footsteps of her grandfather, who was also a pharmacist. After meeting her husband and getting married while in pharmacy school, she transferred to the University of Texas at Austin College of Pharmacy, from which she graduated in 1979.

Upon graduation, she worked for her grandfather's pharmacy before buying her own business in the Loma Park area of San Antonio. She currently works part-time at the Davila Pharmacy on San Antonio's West Side.

Van de Putte became a Kellogg Fellow at Harvard University's John F. Kennedy School of Government in 1993.

== Political career ==
=== Texas House of Representatives ===
Van de Putte began her legislative career with her 1990 election to the Texas House of Representatives (District 115).

=== Texas Senate ===
Van de Putte represented Texas Senate District 26, which consists of a large portion of San Antonio and Bexar County, from 1999–2015. She has represented the district ever since she won a special election to the Senate in 1999. In 2003, she was appointed Chair of the Texas Senate Democratic Caucus, a position she held until 2011. Van de Putte was appointed chair of the Veteran Affairs and Military Installations Committee in 2003, and was a member of the Senate Committees on Education, State Affairs, and Business and Commerce. She was also co-chair of the Joint Committee on Human Trafficking.

She considered running in the 2010 race for governor against Republican Rick Perry, but instead decided to run for re-election in the Texas Senate in June 2009.

On June 25, 2013, Wendy Davis held an 11-hour filibuster in an attempt to run out a special legislative session so that a vote could not be held on Texas Senate Bill 5. At about 15 minutes to midnight, Van de Putte confronted the Presiding Officer, State Senator Robert L. Duncan, a Republican from Lubbock, who she said had ignored her repeated motions earlier. Van de Putte asked him, "at what point must a female senator raise her hand or her voice to be recognized over the male colleagues in the room?" Her question was met with cheers and applause by some spectators in the gallery. The applause delayed the legislative session past the midnight deadline, effectively ending the legislative session without a vote on the bill. This bill was ultimately passed in a special session ordered by then Governor Rick Perry.

On January 8, 2013, she was elected President Pro Tempore of the Texas Senate's 83rd Regular Session.

Coinciding with her announcement to run for Mayor of San Antonio, Van de Putte resigned from the Senate once her successor Jose Menendez was elected, ending nearly 24 years of work at the Texas Capitol.

=== National politics ===
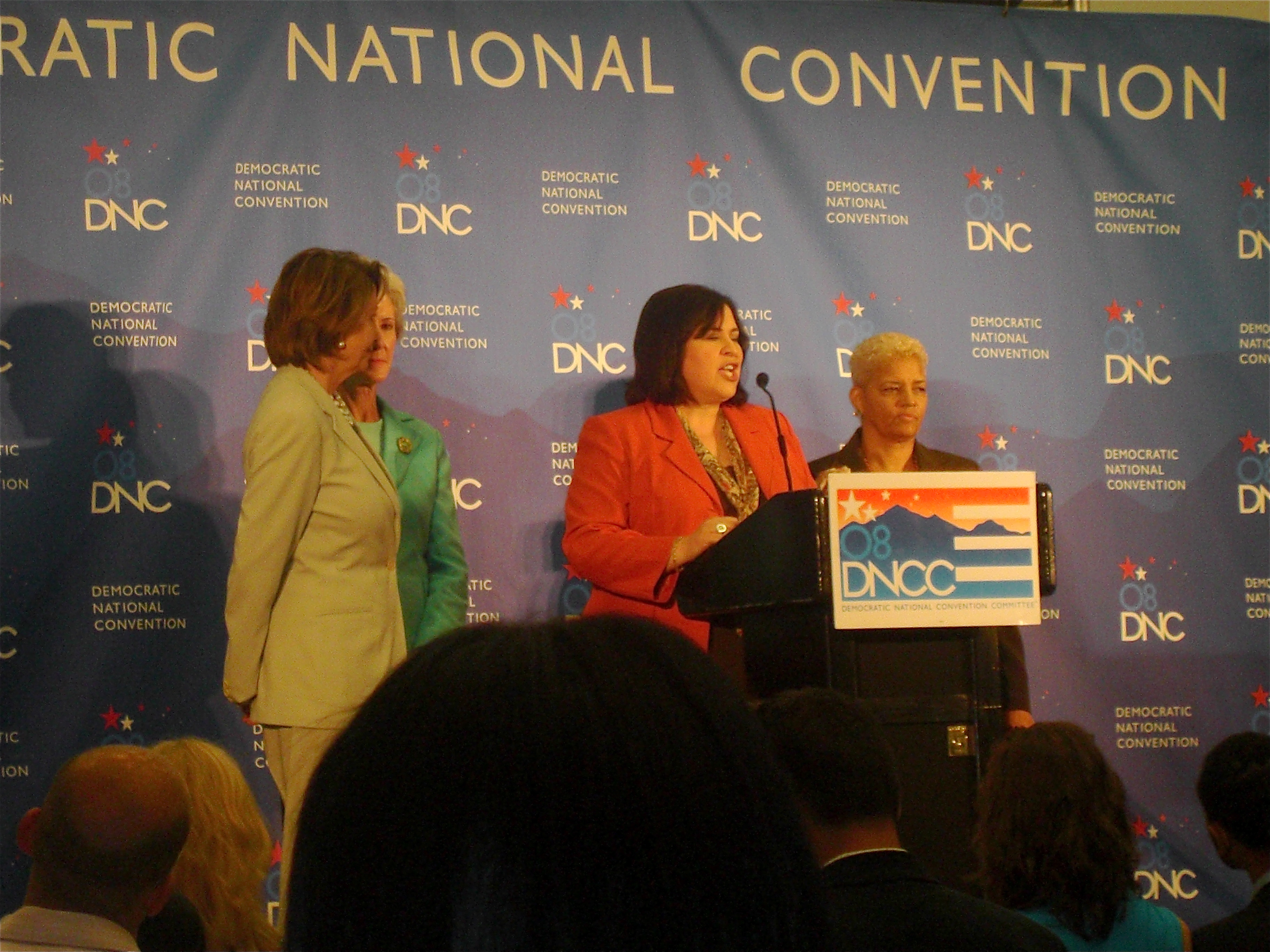
Van de Putte speaks during a press conference before the start of the 2008 Democratic National Convention in Denver, Colorado, flanked by her fellow co-chairs and the convention chair.

At the national level, Van de Putte is an active and deeply involved member of many political organizations, including the National Assessment Governing Board, the American Legacy Foundation Board, and the National Conference of State Legislatures (of which she served as president from 2006 to 2007). In addition, she led the National Hispanic Caucus of State Legislators as president from 2003 to 2005.

In 2008, Van de Putte served as a co-chair of the 2008 Democratic National Convention along with Governor Kathleen Sebelius of Kansas and Atlanta, Georgia Mayor Shirley Franklin, while Speaker of the House Nancy Pelosi served as permanent chair.

In 2016, she was selected as the chair of the 2016 Democratic National Convention rules committee. She endorsed Hillary Clinton in the 2016 presidential election.

=== 2014 lieutenant governor campaign ===
In November 2013, Van de Putte announced that she would be running for lieutenant governor in the 2014 elections.

She ran unopposed in the Democratic primary but lost to Republican Dan Patrick in the general election.

=== 2015 mayoral campaign ===
On November 19, 2014, Van de Putte announced her candidacy for Mayor of San Antonio in the 2015 mayoral election. After finishing first with 30% of the vote in the general election, Van de Putte qualified for the runoff election on 13 June 2015. Despite running a hard campaign, Van de Putte lost the runoff election 52-48 percent to Ivy Taylor.

== Election history ==
Uncontested primary elections are not shown.

=== 2015 ===
San Antonio Mayor, 2015 Regular election, 9 May 2015
| Candidate | | Votes | % | ± |
|---|---|---|---|---|
| ✓ | Leticia Van de Putte | 25,982 | 30.43% | |
| ✓ | Ivy Taylor | 24,245 | 28.40% | |
| | Mike Villarreal | 22,246 | 26.06% | |
| | Tommy Adkisson | 8,344 | 9.77% | |
| | Paul Martinez | 1,877 | 2.20% | |
| | Cynthia Brehm | 1,497 | 1.75% | |
| | Douglas Emmett | 221 | 0.26% | |
| | Michael "Commander" Idrogo | 221 | 0.26% | |
| | Cynthia Cavazos | 201 | 0.24% | |
| | Raymond Zavala | 196 | 0.23% | |
| | Rhett Smith | 111 | 0.13% | |
| | Julie Iris Oldham (Mama Bexar) | 103 | 0.12% | |
| | Gerard Ponce | 97 | 0.11% | |
| | Pogo Mochello Reese | 29 | 0.03% | |
| Turnout | | 85,370 | 11.89%* | |

* Vote percentage include all of Bexar County, with a total of 12,316 either voting in another municipal election or casting no ballot for San Antonio mayor.

San Antonio Mayor, 2015 Runoff election, June 13, 2015
| Candidate | | Votes | % | ± |
|---|---|---|---|---|
| ✓ | Ivy Taylor | 50,659 | 51.70% | |
| | Leticia Van de Putte | 47,328 | 48.30% | |
| Turnout | | 97,987 | 14.12% | |

=== 2014 ===
Texas lieutenant gubernatorial election, 2014
| Party | Candidate | Votes | % |
|---|---|---|---|
| Republican | Dan Patrick | 2,718,406 | 58.13 |
| Democratic | Leticia Van de Putte | 1,810,720 | 38.72 |
| Libertarian | Robert Butler | 119,581 | 2.55 |
| Green | Chandra Courtney | 27,651 | 0.59 |
| Majority | | 907,686 | 19.41% |
| Total votes | | 4,676,358 | 100 |
| Turnout | | | 33.34 |
| Republican hold | | | |

=== 2012 ===
Texas general election, 2012: Senate District 26
| Party | Candidate | Votes | % | ±% |
|---|---|---|---|---|
| Green | Chris Christal | 10,557 | 6.03 | +6.03 |
| Democratic | Leticia R. Van de Putte (Incumbent) | 140,757 | 80.42 | −1.02 |
| Libertarian | Nazirite R. Flores Perez | 22,904 | 13.08 | −5.47 |
| Independent | Deborah L. Parrish | 801 | 0.45 | +0.45 |
| Turnout | | 175,019 | | +4.11 |
| Democratic hold | | | | |

=== 2008 ===
Texas general election, 2008: Senate District 26
| Party | Candidate | Votes | % | ±% |
|---|---|---|---|---|
| Democratic | Leticia R. Van de Putte (Incumbent) | 136,913 | 81.44 | +24.34 |
| Libertarian | Steve Lopez | 31,194 | 18.55 | +15.69 |
| Majority | | 105,719 | 62.89 | +45.83 |
| Turnout | | 168,107 | | −9.13 |
| Democratic hold | | | | |

=== 2004 ===
Texas general election, 2004: Senate District 26
| Party | Candidate | Votes | % | ±% |
|---|---|---|---|---|
| Republican | Jim Valdez | 74,070 | 40.04 | +40.04 |
| Democratic | Leticia R. Van de Putte (Incumbent) | 105,625 | 57.10 | −42.90 |
| Libertarian | Raymundo Alemán | 5,295 | 2.86 | +2.86 |
| Majority | | 31,555 | 17.06 | −82.94 |
| Turnout | | 184,990 | | +149.44 |
| Democratic hold | | | | |

Democratic primary, 2004: Senate District 26
| Candidate | | Votes | % | ± |
|---|---|---|---|---|
| | Johnny Rodriguez | 3,685 | 18.06 | |
| ✓ | Leticia R. Van de Putte (Incumbent) | 16,723 | 81.94 | |
| Majority | | 13,038 | 63.89 | |
| Turnout | | 20,408 | | |

=== 2002 ===
Texas general election, 2002: Senate District 26
| Party | Candidate | Votes | % | ±% |
|---|---|---|---|---|
| Democratic | Leticia R. Van de Putte (Incumbent) | 74,163 | 100.00 | 0.00 |
| Majority | | 74,163 | 100.00 | 0.00 |
| Turnout | | 74,163 | | −29.88 |
| Democratic hold | | | | |

=== 2000 ===
Texas general election, 2000: Senate District 26
| Party | Candidate | Votes | % | ±% |
|---|---|---|---|---|
| Democratic | Leticia R. Van de Putte (Incumbent) | 105,771 | 100.00 | +32.46 |
| Majority | | 105,771 | 100.00 | +64.92 |
| Turnout | | 105,771 | | −16.86 |
| Democratic hold | | | | |

Democratic primary, 2000: Senate District 26
| Candidate | | Votes | % | ± |
|---|---|---|---|---|
| | David McQuade Leibowitz | 11,232 | 45.63 | |
| ✓ | Leticia R. Van de Putte (Incumbent) | 13,381 | 54.37 | |
| Majority | | 2,149 | 8.73 | |
| Turnout | | 24,613 | | |

=== 1999 ===
Special election: Senate District 26, Unexpired term November 2, 1999
| Party | Candidate | Votes | % | ±% |
|---|---|---|---|---|
| Democratic | Leo Alvarado Jr. | 12,473 | 21.02 | |
| Democratic | Lauro Bustamante Jr. | 4,245 | 7.16 | |
| Republican | Anne Newman | 6,768 | 11.41 | |
| Democratic | Leticia Van de Putte | 27,139 | 45.74 | |
| Republican | Mark Weber | 8,702 | 14.67 | |
| Turnout | | 59,327 | | |
| Democratic hold | | | | |

Party political offices
| Preceded by Linda Chavez-Thompson | Democratic nominee for Lieutenant Governor of Texas; 2014 | Succeeded by Mike Collier |
Texas House of Representatives
| Preceded by Orlando Luis Garcia | Member of the Texas House of Representatives from the 115th district 1991–1999 | Succeeded by Mike Villarreal |
Texas Senate
| Preceded by Gregory Luna | Member of the Texas Senate from the 26th district 1999–2015 | Succeeded by Jose Menendez |
