= 2025 San Antonio mayoral election =

- May 3, 2025 (first round); June 7, 2025 (runoff)
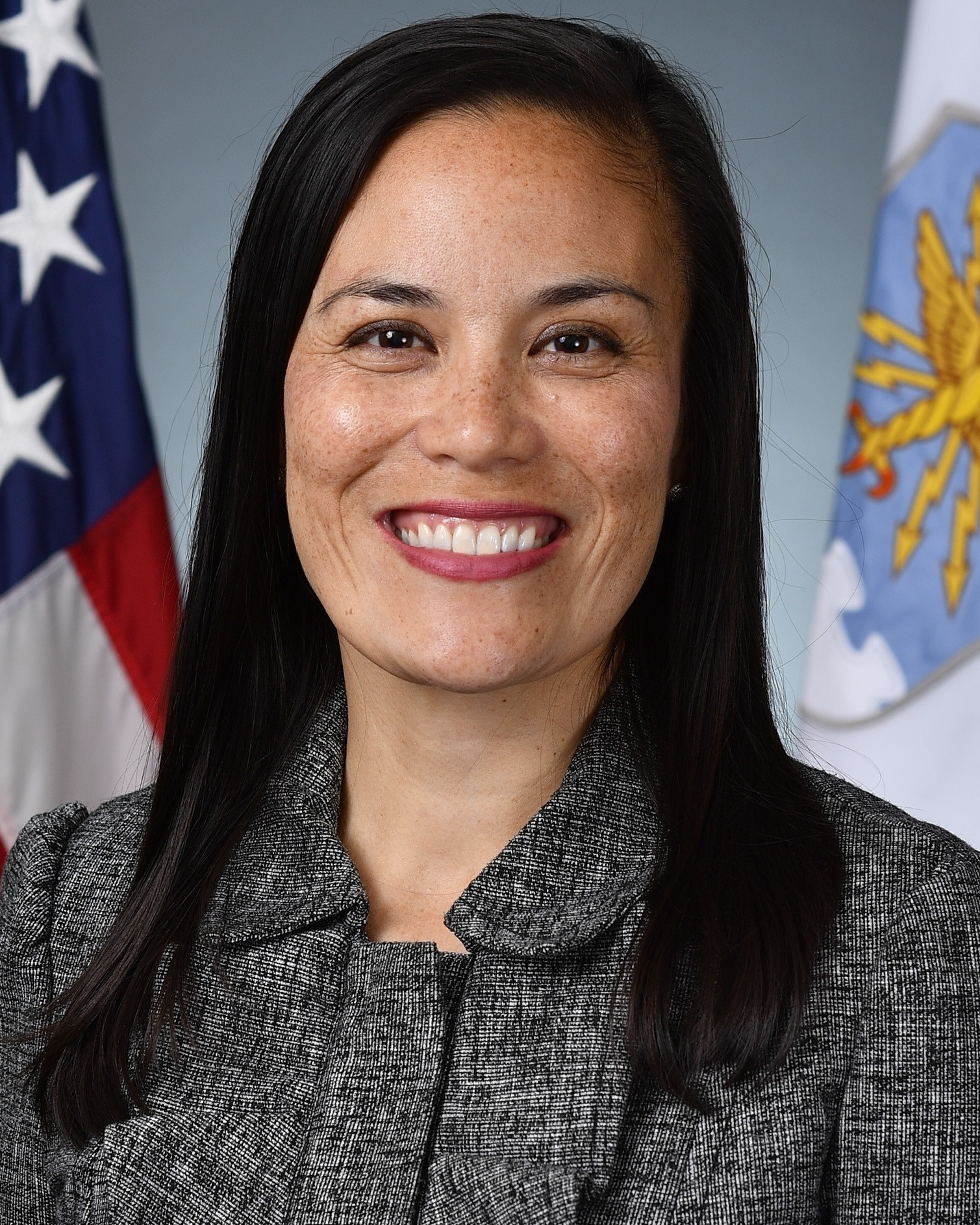

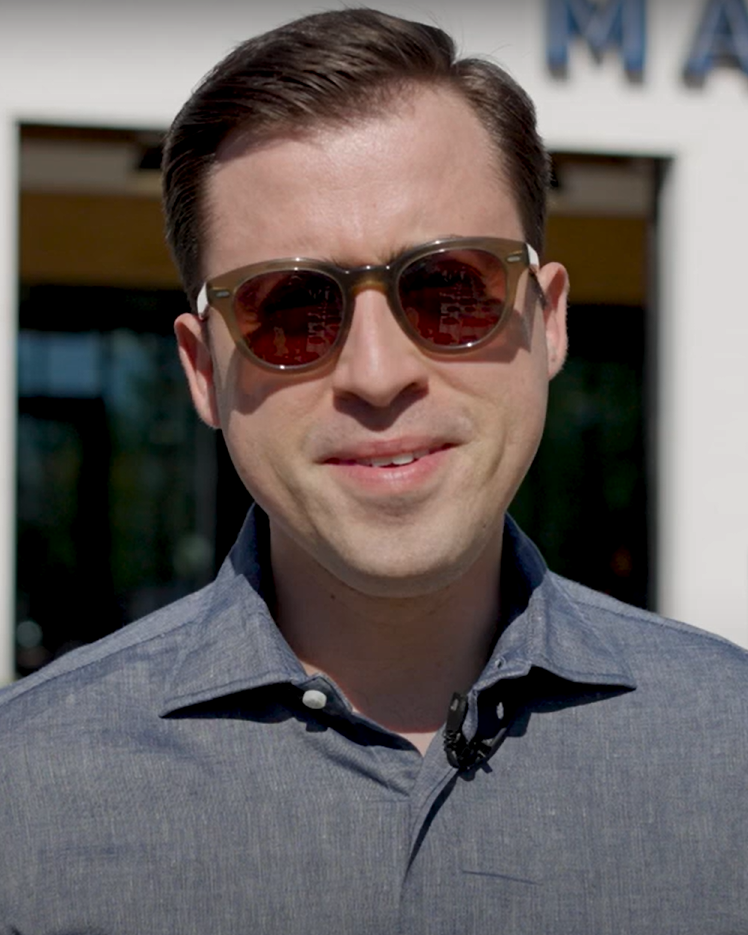

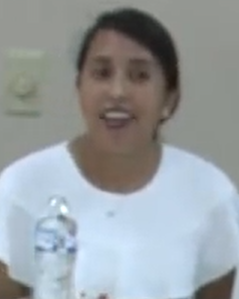

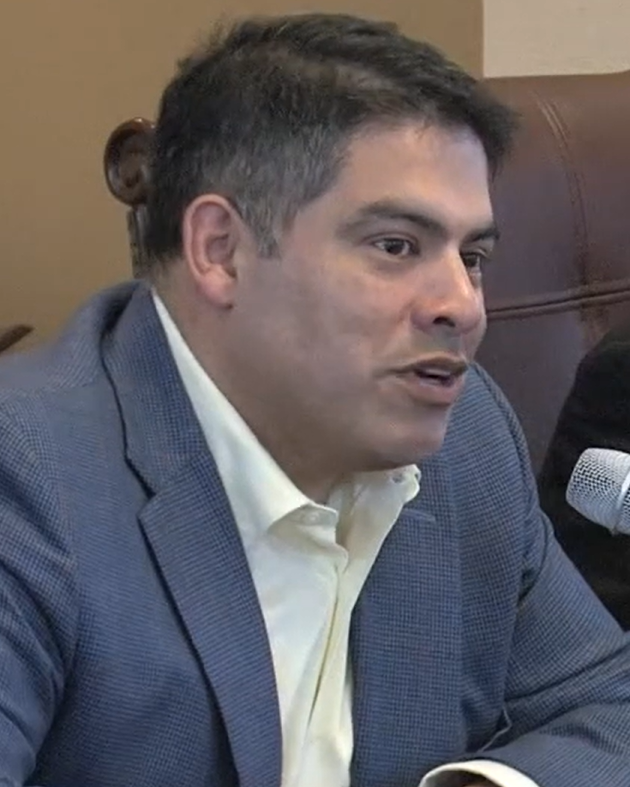

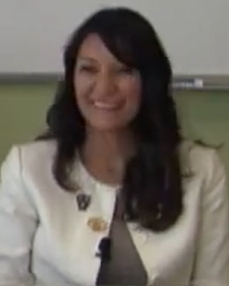

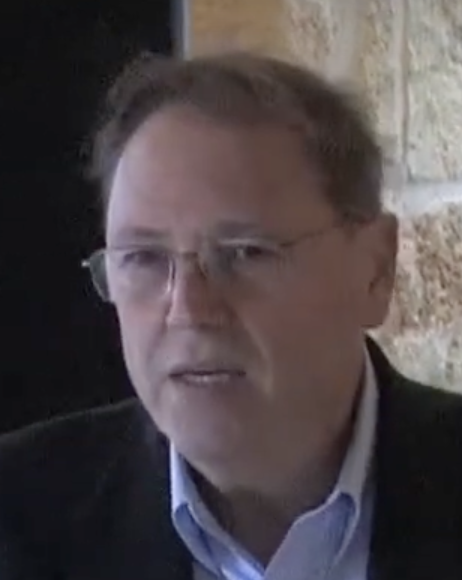
Candidate	Gina Ortiz Jones	Rolando Pablos	Beto Altamirano
First round	27,483; 27.20%	16,785; 16.61%	12,178; 12.05%
Runoff	77,587; 54.32%	65,245; 45.68%	Eliminated
Candidate	Adriana Rocha Garcia	Manny Peláez	Melissa Cabello Havrda
First round	9,992; 9.90%	7,387; 7.31%	6,731; 6.66%
Runoff	Eliminated	Eliminated	Eliminated
Candidate	John Courage	Clayton Perry
First round	5,619; 5.56%	5,572; 5.51%
Runoff	Eliminated	Eliminated
Mayor before election
Ron Nirenberg
Elected mayor
Gina Ortiz Jones

The 2025 San Antonio mayoral election was held on May 3, 2025, to elect the next mayor of San Antonio, Texas. Because no candidate received more than 50% of the vote, the two highest-placing candidates advanced to a runoff election on June 7. Municipal elections in Texas are officially nonpartisan. Due to the passage of Proposition F in 2024, the winner would receive a four-year term, as term limits were changed from four two-year terms to two four-year terms. This was also the final May municipal election, with the election date moving to November following a December 2025 city council vote.

A wide field of 27 candidates qualified for the general election. Former Under Secretary of the Air Force Gina Ortiz Jones and former Texas Secretary of State Rolando Pablos advanced to the runoff. Candidates eliminated in the first round included technology entrepreneur Beto Altamirano and city councilors Adriana Rocha Garcia, Manny Peláez, Melissa Cabello Havrda, John Courage, and Clayton Perry. Jones won the runoff with 54.3% of the vote.

== Background ==
Municipal elections in San Antonio are nonpartisan meaning all candidates are classified as nonpartisan. Incumbent mayor Ron Nirenberg was term-limited, having been elected four prior times in 2017, 2019, 2021, and 2023. Nirenberg was the longest serving mayor of San Antonio since Henry Cisneros, and this election marked the first time since 2009 that no incumbent had been on the ballot.

The first announcement in the campaign came from councilmember John Courage in January 2024, 15 months before the election, nearly tripling the length of time candidates have historically officially campaigned when compared to recent mayoral elections in the city. The first mayoral vacancy since 2009 had led more sitting council members to enter or express interest in the race, in turn leading to increased political divisions within the city council.

== Candidates ==
=== Advanced to runoff ===
- Gina Ortiz Jones, former under secretary of the Air Force (2021–2023) and nominee for Texas's 23rd congressional district in 2018 and 2020 (Democratic)
- Rolando Pablos, former Texas secretary of state (2017–2018) (Republican)

=== Eliminated in the first round ===
- Beto Altamirano, tech entrepreneur
- Santos Alvarado, retiree
- John Courage, (Note: Courage initially declared his candidacy on January 25, 2024, before dropping out of the race on December 2. He then rejoined the race on February 14, 2025.) city councilor for the 9th district (endorsed Ortiz Jones in runoff)
- Armando Dominguez, candidate for mayor in 2023
- Arturo Espinosa, chemical engineer
- Adriana Rocha Garcia, city councilor for the 4th district
- Brandon Gonzales, granite polisher
- April Guadarrama, retired insurance agent
- Melissa Cabello Havrda, city councilor for the 6th district
- Christopher Herring, business consultant
- Jade McCullough, childcare company owner
- James Melvin, construction liaison
- Robert Melvin, real estate company CEO (endorsed Pablos in runoff)
- Manny Peláez, city councilor for the 8th district
- Clayton Perry, former city councilor for the 10th district
- Chris Reyes, survey technician
- Bill Ruppel, appraiser
- Robert Salinas, auto repair shop owner
- Michael Samaniego, candidate for mayor in 2023
- Mauricio Sanchez, investment management company CIO
- Sonia Traut, retiree
- Diana Flores Uriegas, housewife and candidate for mayor in 2023
- Andrew Vicencio, retiree
- Tim Westley, education services specialist at the Department of Defense, Republican nominee for Texas's 15th congressional district in 2016 and 2018, and candidate for Land Commissioner in 2022
- Gerardo Zambrano, engineer

== First round ==
=== Endorsements ===
Beto Altamirano

Local officials

- Nelson Wolff, former Bexar County judge (Note: County executive) (2001–2022) and former mayor of San Antonio (1991–1995)
Melissa Cabello Havrda

Local officials

- Jalen McKee-Rodriguez, San Antonio city councilor from the 2nd district (2021–present)

Labor unions

- Northside American Federation of Teachers Local 3216 (co-endorsed with Ortiz Jones)

Organizations

- Avow Texas (formerly NARAL Pro-Choice Texas)
- Bexar County Young Democrats
Gina Ortiz Jones

U.S. representatives

- Joyce Beatty, OH-3 (2013–present)
- Julia Brownley, CA-26 (2013–present)
- Lois Frankel, FL-22 (2013–present)
- Chrissy Houlahan, PA-6 (2019–present)
- Annie Kuster, NH-2 (2013–2025)
- Norma Torres, CA-35 (2015–present)

State legislators

- Wendy Davis, former state senator from the 10th district (2009–2015)

Individuals

- Charlotte Clymer, activist and writer
- Kelley Robinson, community organizer

Labor unions

- Northside American Federation of Teachers Local 3216 (co-endorsed with Cabello Havrda)
- Texas State Teachers Association Local 67 (Note: This union local is affiliated with both the National Education Association and American Federation of Teachers.)

Organizations

- Annie's List
- Asian American Action Fund
- EMILY's List
- Human Rights Campaign
- LGBTQ Victory Fund
- LPAC
- Stonewall Democrats of San Antonio
- VoteVets.org
- With Honor Fund
Rolando Pablos

County officials

- Kevin Wolff, former Bexar County commissioner (2009–2020)

Political parties

- Bexar County Republican Party
Adriana Rocha Garcia

Local officials

- ~~John Courage, San Antonio city councilor from the 9th district (2017–present)~~ (reentered the mayoral race in February 2025)

Newspapers and other publications

- Houston Chronicle
- San Antonio Express-News
Declined to endorse

Labor unions

- American Federation of State, County and Municipal Employees Local 2021
- American Postal Workers Union Local 195
- International Association of Fire Fighters Local 624
- San Antonio AFL-CIO
- San Antonio Police Officers Association

Organizations

- San Antonio Democratic Socialists of America

=== Polling ===
Poll source	Date(s) administered	Sample size (Note: Key: A – all adults RV – registered voters LV – likely voters V – unclear)	Margin of error	Beto Altamirano	John Courage	Adriana Rocha Garcia	Melissa Cabello Havrda	Gina Ortiz Jones	Manny Peláez	Clayton Perry	Rolando Pablos	Other	Undecided
Blueprint Polling (D)	April 29–30, 2025	751 (LV)	± 3.6%	12%	5%	5%	9%	23%	4%	4%	15%	10% (Note: "Do not remember" with 3%)	11%
UT San Antonio	April 7–9, 2025	685 (LV)	± 3.7%	7%	7%	4%	4%	13%	5%	4%	5%	8% (Note: Westley with 3%)	45% (Note: "Don't know" with 30%; "I'm not familiar with any of the candidates running for mayor" with 15%)
UT San Antonio	February 17–20, 2025	683 (LV)	± 3.8%	4%	8%	3%	4%	9%	6%	3%	1%	7% (Note: Westley with 2%; Espinosa, Flores Uriegas, Pablos, and "Someone else" with 1%; Alvarado, Dominguez, Gonzales, Herring, McCullough, Robert Melvin, Reyes, Salinas, Samaniego, Sanchez, Traut, and "I would not vote in this race" with 0%)	56% (Note: "Don't know" with 35%; "I'm not familiar with any of the candidates running for mayor" with 21%)
UT San Antonio	September 11–16, 2024	692 (RV)	± 3.7%	4%	9%	4%	4%	–	5%	–	1%	4% (Note: "Someone else" with 3%; "I would not vote in this race" with 1%)	70% (Note: "I'm not familiar with any of the candidates running for mayor" with 43%; "Don't know" with 27%)

=== Results ===
2025 San Antonio mayoral election (first round)
Candidate	Votes	%
Gina Ortiz Jones	27,517	27.20%
Rolando Pablos	16,798	16.61%
Beto Altamirano	12,190	12.05%
Adriana Rocha Garcia	10,016	9.90%
Manny Peláez	7,398	7.31%
Melissa Cabello Havdra	6,736	6.66%
John Courage	5,625	5.56%
Clayton Perry	5,575	5.51%
Tim Westley	3,776	3.73%
Robert T. Melvin	944	0.93%
Christopher Reyes	552	0.52%
Sonia Traut	449	0.44%
Diana Flores Uriegas	444	0.44%
Jade McCullough	425	0.42%
Brandon Gonzales	355	0.35%
Mauricio 'Mau' Sanchez	337	0.33%
Andrew Fernandez Vicencio	303	0.30%
Michael 'Sam' Samaniego	302	0.30%
Christopher Herring	236	0.23%
Robert Salinas	197	0.19%
Gerardo Zambrano	183	0.18%
Santos Alvarado	164	0.16%
James 'Jae' Melvin	163	0.16%
Armando Dominguez	152	0.15%
April Guadarrama	149	0.15%
Bill Ruppel	113	0.11%
Arturo Espinosa	81	0.08%
Total votes	101,150	100.00%

== Runoff ==
=== Runoff endorsements ===
Gina Ortiz Jones

Federal officials

- Pete Buttigieg, former U.S. secretary of transportation (2021–2025) (Note: Buttigieg endorsed in the first round, but this endorsement was only reported in non-campaign sources ahead of the runoff.)
- Julian Castro, former U.S. secretary of housing and urban development (2014–2017) and former mayor of San Antonio (2009–2014)

U.S. senators

- Tammy Duckworth, U.S. senator from Illinois (2017–present)

U.S. representatives

- Greg Casar, TX-35 (2023–present)
- Joaquin Castro, TX-20 (2013–present)
- Jason Crow, CO-6 (2019–present)
- Veronica Escobar, TX-16 (2019–present)

State senators

- Roland Gutierrez, 19th district (2021–present)
- Jose Menendez, 26th district (2015–present)

State representatives

- Diego Bernal, 123rd district (2015–present)
- Trey Martinez Fischer, 116th district (2001–2017, 2019–present)
- Josey Garcia, 124th district (2023–present)
- Gene Wu, House minority leader (2025–present) from the 137th district (2013–present)

San Antonio officials

- Teri Castillo, 5th district (2021–present)
- Phil Hardberger, former mayor of San Antonio (2005–2009)
- Jalen McKee-Rodriguez, 2nd district (2021–present)
- Edward Mungia, 4th district-elect (2025–present)
- Phyllis Viagrán, 3rd district (2021–present)

County officials

- Rebeca Clay-Flores, Bexar County commissioner (2021–present)
- Lina Hidalgo, Harris County Judge (2019–present)
- Justin Rodriguez, Bexar County commissioner (2019–present)
- Javier Salazar, Bexar County sheriff (2017–present)

Local officials

- Justin Bibb, mayor of Cleveland, Ohio (2022–present)
- Paige Cognetti, mayor of Scranton, Pennsylvania (2020–present)
- Kate Gallego, mayor of Phoenix, Arizona (2019–present)
- Todd Gloria, mayor of San Diego, California (2013–2014; 2022–present)
- Tim Keller, mayor of Albuquerque, New Mexico (2017–present)
- Satya Rhodes-Conway, mayor of Madison, Wisconsin (2019–present)

Individuals

- Eric Alva, adjunct professor
- Amanda Zurawski, reproductive rights activist

Labor unions

- Amalgamated Transit Union Local 694
- American Federation of Government Employees Local 1033
- American Federation of State, County and Municipal Employees Local 2021
- Communications Workers of America Local 6143 (Note: The union co-endorsed Cabello Havrda, Ortiz Jones, and Rocha Garcia in the first round, but this endorsement was only reported in non-campaign sources ahead of the runoff.)
- Laborers' International Union of North America Local 28
- San Antonio AFL-CIO

Organizations

- Moms Demand Action for Gun Sense in America
- National Conference of Democratic Mayors
- Sierra Club Political Committee of Texas

Political parties

- Bexar County Democratic Party
Rolando Pablos

State cabinet officials

- Hope Andrade, former Texas secretary of state (2008–2012)

U.S. representatives

- Henry Bonilla, TX-23 (1993–2007)
- Will Hurd, TX-23 (2015–2021)

State senators

- Donna Campbell, 25th district (2013–present)
- Leticia Van de Putte, 26th district (1999–2015) (Democratic)

State representatives

- Frank Corte Jr., 122nd district (1993–2011)
- John Lujan, 118th district (2016–2017; 2021–present)
- Ina Minjarez, 124th district (2015–2023) (Democratic)
- Leo Pacheco, 118th district (2019–2021) (Democratic)

County officials

- Grant Moody, Bexar County commissioner (2022–present)
- Sylvia Romo, former Bexar County tax assessor-collector (1997–2012) (Democratic)

Local officials

- Marc Whyte, San Antonio city councilor from the 10th district (2023–present)

Individuals

- Robert Melvin, real estate company CEO and 2025 mayoral candidate

Labor unions

- San Antonio Police Officers' Association

Newspapers

- San Antonio Express-News

Organizations

- Republican National Hispanic Assembly of Texas
- San Antonio National Apartment Association
- Texas and San Antonio Board of Realtors
Declined to endorse

San Antonio officials

- Marina Alderete Gavito, 7th district (2023–present)
- Melissa Cabello Havrda, 6th district (2019–2025) and 2025 mayoral candidate
- John Courage, 9th district and 2025 mayoral candidate
- Ron Nirenberg, outgoing mayor of San Antonio (2017–2025)
- Manny Peláez, 8th district (2019–2025) and 2025 mayoral candidate
- Adriana Rocha Garcia, 4th district (2019–2025) and 2025 mayoral candidate

Labor unions

- International Association of Fire Fighters Local 624

=== Runoff polling ===
Poll source	Date(s) administered	Sample size	Margin of error	Gina Ortiz Jones	Rolando Pablos	Other	Undecided
Blueprint Polling (D)	June 3–4, 2025	901 (LV)	± 3.3%	50%	41%	3% (Note: "Do not remember" with 3%)	7%
Blueprint Polling (D)	April 29–30, 2025	751 (LV)	± 3.6%	46%	26%	–	28%

=== Results ===
2025 San Antonio mayoral election (runoff)
Candidate	Votes	%
Gina Ortiz Jones	77,587	54.32%
Rolando Pablos	65,245	45.68%
Total votes	142,832	100.00%

== See also ==
- 2025 San Antonio City Council elections
