= 2025 San Antonio City Council election =

- May 3, 2025

The 2025 San Antonio City Council election was held on May 3, 2025, to fill all 10 seats of the City Council of San Antonio, Texas. If no candidate received at least 50.00% of the vote in each district, the two highest-placing candidates would advance to a runoff election on June 7. Due to the passage of Proposition F in the 2024 election, winners received a four-year term, as term limits were changed from four two-year terms to two four-year terms. The election was held alongside the election for mayor.

== Background ==
=== Mayoral ===
Municipal elections in San Antonio are nonpartisan, meaning all candidates are classified as nonpartisan. Incumbent Mayor Ron Nirenberg was term-limited, having been elected four prior times in 2017, 2019, 2021, and 2023. Nirenberg was expected to be the longest-serving mayor of San Antonio since Henry Cisneros, and this election marked the first time since 2009 that no incumbent was on the ballot.

The first announcement in the campaign came from Councilmember John Courage in January 2024, 15 months before the election, nearly tripling the length of time candidates had historically officially campaigned when compared to recent mayoral elections in the city. The first mayoral vacancy since 2009 led more sitting council members to enter or express interest in the race, in turn leading to increased political divisions within the city council.

== Retiring and term-limited incumbents ==
Two council members were term-limited. Two other council members announced their retirement, both to run for mayor.

=== Term-limited ===
- District 8: Manny Pelaez was term-limited, and was running for mayor of San Antonio.
- District 9: John Courage was term-limited, and was running for mayor of San Antonio.

=== Retiring ===
- District 4: Adriana Rocha Garcia retired to run for mayor of San Antonio.
- District 6: Melissa Cabello Havrda retired to run for mayor of San Antonio.

== District 1 ==
The 1st district covers the downtown area, including neighborhoods such as Tobin Hill and Monte Vista. The incumbent was Sukh Kaur, who was elected with 59.12% of the vote in a 2023 runoff, defeating incumbent Mario Bravo. Kaur was running for re-election.

=== Candidates ===
==== Declared ====
- Maureen Galindo, family therapist and housing organizer
- Matthew Gauna, environmental science student and previous District 1 candidate
- Patty Gibbons, Neighborhood Association President
- Ramiro Gonzales, housing consultant and former City Hall staffer
- Sukh Kaur, incumbent councilmember
- Anita Marie Kegley, home inspector
- Dominique "Domingo" Littwitz, entrepreneur
- Julisa Medrano-Guerra, small business owner
- Arnulfo Ortiz, attorney
- Susan Strawn, attorney

=== Endorsements ===
Sukh Kaur

U.S. representatives

- Henry Bonilla, former U.S. representative from Texas's 23rd congressional district (1993–2007) (Republican)
- Joaquin Castro, U.S. representative from Texas's 20th congressional district (2013–present) (Democratic)

Statewide officials

- Hope Andrade, former secretary of state of Texas (2008–2012) (Republican)

State legislators

- Diego Bernal, state representative from the 123rd district (2015-present) (Democratic)
- Jose Menendez, state senator from the 26th district (2015-present), former state representative from the 124th district (2001–2015) (Democratic)
- Mike Villarreal, former state representative from the 115th district (2000–2003), from the 123rd district (2003–2015) (Democratic)

Local Officials

- Ed Garza, San Antonio Independent School District trustee from district 7 (2009–present), former mayor of San Antonio (2001–2009), former San Antonio city councilor from the 8th district (1997–2001) (Democratic)
- Debra Guerrero, former San Antonio Independent School District trustee from district 3 (2017–2021)
- Christina Martinez, San Antonio Independent School District trustee from district 6 (2017-present)
- Ron Nirenberg, outgoing mayor of San Antonio (2017-present), former San Antonio city councilor from the 8th district (2013–2017) (Independent)
- Roger Perez, former San Antonio city councilor from the 1st district (1991–1995)
- Nelson Wolff, former Bexar County Judge (2001–2022), former mayor of San Antonio (1991–1995) (Democratic)

=== Results ===
2025 San Antonio City Council District 1 election
Candidate	Votes	%
Sukh Kaur	5,972	48.92
Patty Gibbons	2,170	17.78
Susan Strawn	1,615	13.23
Julisa Medrano-Guerra	744	6.09
Ramiro Gonzales	742	6.08
Anita Marie Kegley	314	2.57
Maureen Galindo	307	2.52
Matthew Gauna	160	1.31
Arnulfo Ortiz	120	0.98
Dominique "Domingo" Littwitz	63	0.52
Total votes	12,207	100.00

2025 San Antonio City Council District 1 run-off election
Candidate	Votes	%
Sukh Kaur	10,813	65.00
Patty Gibbons	5,822	35.00
Total votes	16,635	100.00

== District 2 ==
The 2nd district encompasses the eastern part of San Antonio, including Eastside Promise Zone and Denver Heights. The incumbent was Jalen McKee-Rodriguez, who was re-elected with 56.04% of the vote in 2023. McKee was running for re-election.

=== Candidates ===
==== Declared ====
- Sean Hanlin, self-employed
- Rose Requenez Hill, previous District 2 candidate
- Bryant Livingston, mortuary attendant and football announcer
- Jalen McKee-Rodriguez, incumbent councilmember
- Sonya Moore, unemployed
- Stephanie Powell, Air Force civilian employee
- Carla-Joy Sisco, information technology business relationship manager
- Kizzie Thomas, school administrator

=== Endorsements ===
Jalen McKee-Rodriguez

Local officials

- Ron Nirenberg, mayor of San Antonio (2017–present)

Organizations

- San Antonio Democratic Socialists of America

=== Results ===
2025 San Antonio City Council District 2 election
Candidate	Votes	%
Jalen McKee-Rodriguez	3,944	61.36
Carla-Joy Sisco	587	9.13
Stephanie Powell	582	9.05
Kizzie D. Thomas	386	6.00
Rose Requenez Hill	344	5.35
Sean Hanlin	278	4.32
Bryant Livingston	149	2.32
Sonya Moore	158	2.46
Total votes	6,428	100.00

== District 3 ==
The 3rd district is located in the southeastern section of the city, including Highland Park and Mission San Jose. The incumbent was Phyllis Viagran, who was re-elected with 50.09% of the vote in 2023. Viagran was running for re-election.

=== Candidates ===
==== Declared ====
- Larry LaRose, U.S. Coast Guard veteran and previous District 3 candidate
- Kenneth Thomas, production associate
- Phyllis Viagran, incumbent councilmember
- Kendra Wilkerson, teacher

==== Withdrawn ====
- Mai Elsberry, tax accountant (withdrew after the filing deadline)

=== Results ===
2025 San Antonio City Council District 3 election
Candidate	Votes	%
Phyllis Viagran	3,728	57.34
Kendra Wilkerson	1,182	18.18
Larry LaRose	1,070	16.46
Kenneth Thomas	522	8.03
Total votes	6,502	100.00

== District 4 ==
The 4th district is situated in the southwestern area of the city, including Indian Creek and Palo Alto. The incumbent was Dr. Adriana Rocha Garcia, who was re-elected with 75.15% of the vote in 2023. Rocha Garcia was retiring to run for mayor.

=== Candidates ===
==== Declared ====
- Ernesto Arrelano Jr., former South San ISD board member
- Johnathon Cruz, middle school principal
- Gregorio De La Paz, construction manager and previous District 4 candidate
- Jose "Pepe" Martinez, small business owner
- Edward Mungia, District 4 staffer and former South San ISD board member

=== Results ===
2025 San Antonio City Council District 4 election
Candidate	Votes	%
Edward Mungia	3,116	56.80
Jose "Pepe" Martinez	836	15.24
Johnathon Cruz	700	12.76
Eresto Arellano Jr.	437	7.97
Gregorio De La Paz	397	7.24
Total votes	5,486	100.00

== District 5 ==
The 5th district covers the region west of downtown, including Prospect Hill and Collins Garden. The incumbent was Teri Castillo, who was re-elected with 62.90% of the vote in 2023. Castillo was running for re-election.

=== Candidates ===
==== Declared ====
- Pablo Arriaga III, San Antonio Police Department employee
- Teri Castillo, incumbent councilmember
- Raymond Zavala, previous mayoral candidate

=== Endorsements ===
Teri Castillo

Organizations

- San Antonio Democratic Socialists of America

=== Results ===
2025 San Antonio City Council District 5 election
Candidate	Votes	%
Terri Castillo	3,378	76.83
Pablo Arriaga III	749	17.03
Raymond Zavala	270	6.14
Total votes	4,397	100.00

== District 6 ==
The 6th district includes the western parts of San Antonio, including Heritage and Great Northwest. The incumbent was Melissa Cabello Havrda, who was re-elected with 53.76% of the vote in 2023. Cabello Havrda was retiring to run for mayor.

=== Candidates ===
==== Declared ====
- Lawson Alaniz-Picasso, former District 1 staffer
- Chris Baecker, economics professor and government watchdog
- Vanessa Chavez, former District 7 staffer
- Ric Galvan, District 5 staffer and political organizer
- Kelly Ann Gonzalez, political organizer and former union representative
- Bobby Herrera, past District 6 councilman
- Gerald Lopez, Alamo Colleges trustee and former Northside ISD board member
- Carlos Antonio Raymond, retired veteran

==== Withdrawn ====
- Homer Guevara, Northside ISD board member and college professor
- Donovon Rodruguez, legislative staffer

=== Results ===
2025 San Antonio City Council District 6 election
Candidate	Votes	%
Ric Galvan	1,631	19.37
Kelly Ann Gonzalez	1,660	19.71
Chris Baecker	1,484	17.62
Vanessa Chavez	1,414	16.79
Gerald Lopez	762	9.05
Lawson Alaniz-Picasso	715	8.49
Bobby Herrera	458	5.44
'San' Carlos Antonio Raymond	298	3.54
Total votes	8,422	100.00

2025 San Antonio City Council District 6 runoff election
Candidate	Votes	%
Ric Galvan	5,771	50.12
Kelly Ann Gonzalez	5,743	49.88
Total votes	11,514	100.00

== District 7 ==
The 7th district is located in northwestern San Antonio, including Jefferson and Woodlawn Lake. The incumbent was Marina Alderete Gavito, who was elected with 62.11% of the vote in a 2023 runoff. Alderete Gavito was running for re-election.

=== Candidates ===
==== Declared ====
- Marina Alderete Gavito, incumbent councilmember
- Trinity Haddox, political newcomer
- Cynthia Lugo Alderete, self-employed

=== Results ===
2025 San Antonio City Council District 7 election
Candidate	Votes	%
Marina Alderete Gavito	7,973	71.58
Cynthia Lugo Alderete	1,535	21.12
Trinity Haddox	803	7.21
Total votes	11,138	100.00

== District 8 ==
The 8th district is located in northwestern San Antonio, including neighborhoods like Leon Valley and the Medical Center. The incumbent was Manny Pelaez, who was re-elected with 70.47% of the vote in 2023. Pelaez was term-limited, and was running for mayor.

=== Candidates ===
==== Declared ====
- Cesario Garcia, conservative activist and previous city council candidate
- Ivalis Meza Gonzalez, former chief of staff for Mayor Nirenberg, and 2022 Bexar County judge candidate
- Rodney "Rod" Kidd, operations consultant
- Paula McGee, attorney
- Cindy Onyekwelu, software engineering contractor for the U.S. Air Force at Port San Antonio
- Sakib Shaikh, small business owner and former District 8 staffer

==== Declined ====
- Marta Pelaez, incumbent's mother

=== Endorsements ===
Ivalis Meza Gonzalez

Local officials

- Ron Nirenberg, mayor of San Antonio (2017–present)

=== Results ===
2025 San Antonio City Council District 8 election
Candidate	Votes	%
Ivaliz Meza Gonzalez	4,981	40.37
Paula McGee	2,739	22.20
Sakib Shaikh	2,664	21.59
Cesario Garcia	1,111	9.00
Cindy Onyekwelu	475	3.85
Rodney "Rod" Kidd	368	2.98
Total votes	12,338	100.00

2025 San Antonio City Council District 8 run-off election
Candidate	Votes	%
Ivaliz Meza Gonzalez	9,366	57.37
Paula McGee	6,959	42.63
Total votes	16,325	100.00

== District 9 ==
The 9th district covers the north-central area of the city, including Stone Oak and Encino Park. The incumbent was John Courage, who was re-elected with 62.48% of the vote in 2023. Courage was term-limited, and was running for mayor.

While municipal races are nonpartisan, District 9 is considered to be the most conservative-leaning.

=== Candidates ===
==== Declared ====
- Angi Taylor Aramburu, small business owner and 2022 Democratic nominee for Texas House District 122
- April Chang, nonprofit executive
- Emily Joy Garza, small business owner and animal welfare activist
- Tristen Hoffman, high school student
- Daniel Mezza, entrepreneur and small business owner
- Misty Spears, Bexar County Commissioners Court staffer and 2022 Republican nominee for Bexar County district clerk
- Celeste Tidwell, previous District 10 candidate

=== Results ===
2025 San Antonio City Council District 9 election
Candidate	Votes	%
Misty Spears	6,244	38.01
Angi Taylor Aramburu	5,845	35.58
April Chang	1,484	9.03
Daniel Mezza	1,419	8.64
Emily Joy Garza	883	5.38
Tristen Hoffman	308	1.87
Celeste Tidwell	245	1.49
Total votes	16,428	100.00

2025 San Antonio City Council District 9 runoff election
Candidate	Votes	%
Misty Spears	13,862	56.71
Angi Taylor Aramburu	10,580	43.29
Total votes	24,442	100.00

== District 10 ==
The 10th district encompasses the northeastern part of San Antonio, including Northern Hills and El Dorado. The incumbent was Marc Whyte, who was elected with 57.84% of the vote in 2023. Whyte was running for re-election.

Whyte was arrested and charged with a DWI shortly after his term began, and while appearing vulnerable at first, kept his supporters at his side.

=== Candidates ===
==== Declared ====
- Eric Litaker, chef
- Clint Norton, retired
- Mark O'Donnell, business consultant
- Anthony Roy II, business owner
- Marc Whyte, incumbent councilmember

=== Results ===
2025 San Antonio City Council District 10 election
Candidate	Votes	%
Marc Whyte	8,558	69.10
Anthony Roy II	1,550	12.52
Eric Litaker	1,086	8.77
Clint Norton	630	5.09
Mark O'Donnell	561	4.53
Total votes	12,385	100.00
