= Elisa Chan =

Taiwanese-American politician and businesswoman

- 戰琬瑜
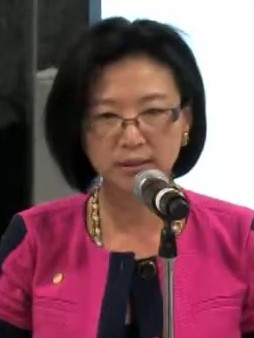
- Chan at a city council meeting in 2013

Member of the San Antonio City Council
- In office 2009–2013

Personal details
- Born: 1966 (age 58–59) Taipei, Taiwan
- Citizenship: United States
- Education: Beijing University of Technology (BS); University of Texas at Austin (MS)

Elisa Chan (Chinese: 戰琬瑜; pinyin: Zhàn Wǎnyú) is a Taiwanese-American politician and businesswoman who has served as a member for District 9 of the San Antonio City Council in San Antonio, Texas. She was a candidate in the 2022 Republican primary for the Texas House of Representatives.

== Early life and education ==
Chan was born in Taipei, Taiwan, in 1966 to Chinese parents. She was raised in Taiwan and Brazil before she and her family moved to China in 1980. She emigrated to the United States in 1988 to attend the University of Texas at San Antonio, and then in 1992 with Clifford Hew co-founded Unintech Consulting Engineers (UNINTECH), a structural and civil engineering design and consulting firm. She and Hew married in 1994. She became a citizen of the United States in 1999.

Chan attended the Beijing University of Technology, where she received her B.S. in computer software engineering in 1987, and later received her master's degree in computer science at the University of Texas at San Antonio in 1993. After completing her master's degree, she was a product manager for Emis Software Inc., and she began work for the Research Imaging Center at the University of Texas Health Science Center in 1995. In 1998, she joined UNINTECH and oversaw the expansion of the company.

== Political career ==
In 2009, Chan was elected to the San Antonio City Council, becoming the first woman and first member of a minority group to represent the district. She easily won reelection several times.

In August 2013, the San Antonio Express-News published a report based on a secretly-recorded May 21 conversation between Chan and a colleague about a proposed anti-discrimination ordinance designed to protect lesbian, gay, bisexual and transgender residents from discrimination in which she made a variety of comments, including a reference to the LGBTQ community as "disgusting"; this occurred several months prior to the city council debating the proposed human rights ordinance. Political officials criticized her comments after the report was published and the Human Rights Campaign and others called for her to resign, and her comments received national attention from the media. After defending her comments on the basis of freedom of speech, she voted against the ordinance in September, and the ordinance passed 8–3.

In October 2013, Chan announced her resignation from the city council effective October 18 after stating in September that she would run against the incumbent Tea Party Republican Donna Campbell in Texas Senate District 25. She lost the primary election to Campbell by 31 points.

In 2022, Chan competed in the Republican primary for the vacant seat in Texas House District 122 following the retirement of State Representative Lyle Larson. In the March 2022 primary, she received the most votes with 37 percent of the vote. A runoff election on May 24 was required because no candidate reached 50 percent. She did not win the runoff election.

== Election results ==
Texas's 122nd House of Representatives district primary election
Party	Candidate	Votes	%
Republican	Mark Dorazio	7,930	55
Republican	Elisa Chan	6,496	45
