= Mark Dorazio =

American politician

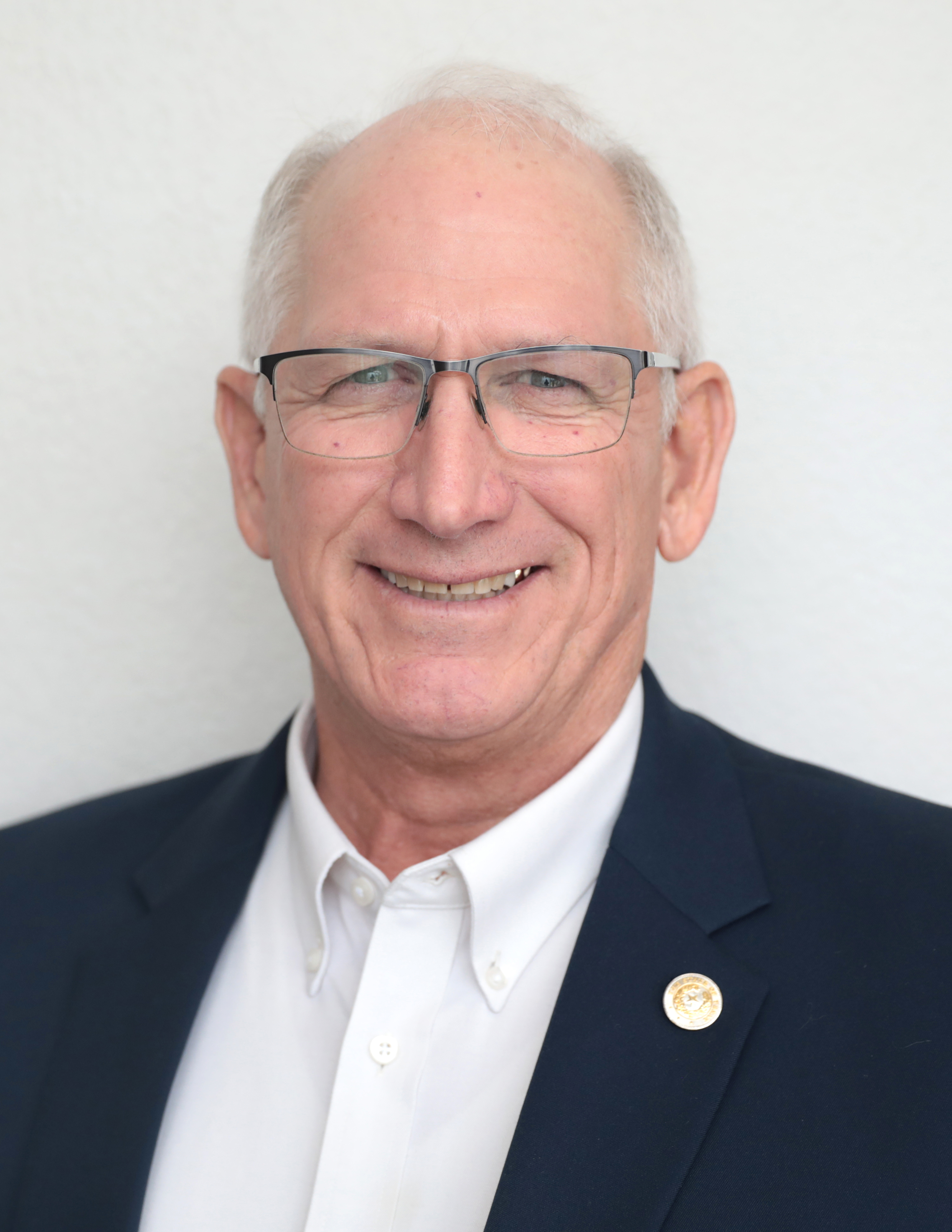

Member of the Texas House of Representatives from the 122nd district
- Incumbent
- Assumed office January 10, 2023
- Preceded by: Lyle Larson

Personal details
- Born: January 4, 1957 (age 69) Derry, Pennsylvania, U.S.
- Party: Republican

Mark Dorazio (born January 4, 1957) is an American politician. He serves as a Republican member for the 122nd district of the Texas House of Representatives.

== Life and career ==
Dorazio owns a construction business.

In May 2022, Dorazio defeated former San Antonio City Councilwoman Elisa Chan in the Republican primary election for the 122nd district of the Texas House of Representatives. In November 2022, he defeated Angi Aramburu and Stephanie Berlin in the general election, winning 56 percent of the votes. He succeeded Lyle Larson. He assumed office in 2023.
