= 2019 San Antonio mayoral election =

- May 4, 2019 (first round); June 8, 2019 (runoff)
- Turnout: 11.46% ▼ (first round); 15.43% ▲ (runoff)
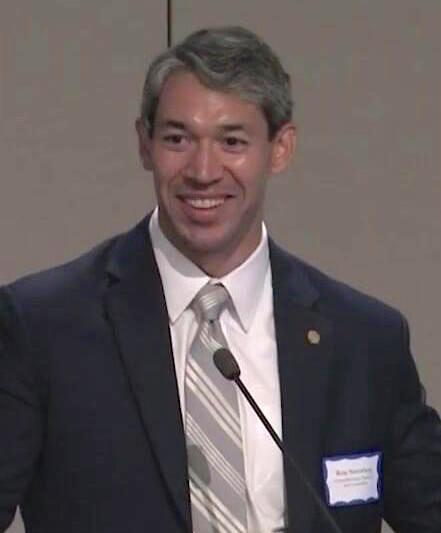

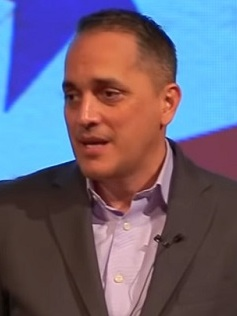
Candidate	Ron Nirenberg	Greg Brockhouse
First round	49,579; 48.67%	46,414; 45.56%
Runoff	61,741; 51.11%	59,051; 48.89%
Mayor before election
Ron Nirenberg
Elected mayor
Ron Nirenberg

On May 4, 2019, the city of San Antonio, Texas held an election to choose the next mayor of San Antonio. The election was a nonpartisan blanket primary. As no candidate secured a majority of the vote (50% of all votes cast +1), a runoff was held on June 8, 2019, between the two top candidates, incumbent mayor Ron Nirenberg and San Antonio City Councilman Greg Brockhouse. In the runoff, Nirenberg narrowly defeated Brockhouse, 51.11% to 48.89%.

== Background ==
In the 2017 San Antonio mayoral election, Nirenberg became the first person in twenty years to defeat an incumbent mayor when he defeated Ivy Taylor in a highly contested runoff election. During his tenure in office, Nirenberg's progressive platform was often criticized and challenged by Greg Brockhouse, a more conservative member of the San Antonio City Council who also took office in 2017. Brockhouse repeatedly stated that he would challenge for the mayor's office when the 2019 elections were held. Nirenberg officially declared his candidacy for re-election on January 29, 2019 and Brockhouse officially declared his candidacy on February 9, 2019.

== Candidates ==
A total of nine candidates submitted applications to be on the ballot for mayor. Nirenberg and Brockhouse were identified as the primary two candidates in the election.

=== Declared ===
(as listed in order on the official ballot)

- John Velasquez, a previous mayoral candidate
- Ron Nirenberg, incumbent Mayor of San Antonio
- Matt Pina, 2018 Libertarian Party nominee for Texas Land Commissioner
- Michael "Commander" Idrogo, a previous mayoral candidate
- Greg Brockhouse, member of the San Antonio City Council, District 6
- Tim Atwood
- Carlos Castanuela
- Bert Cecconi, retired Air Force colonel and perennial San Antonio City Council candidate
- Antonio "Tony" Diaz, a previous mayoral candidate

=== Endorsements ===
italicized individuals and organizations are post-regular election endorsements

Brockhouse
- Republican Party of Bexar County
- San Antonio Police Officers Association
- San Antonio Professional Firefighters Association
Nirenberg
- Joaquin Castro, member of the United States House of Representatives for Texas's 20th congressional district
- Julian Castro, former Mayor of San Antonio, former United States Secretary of Housing and Urban Development, and candidate for the Democratic nomination for President of the United States in 2020.
- Manny Peláez, San Antonio City Councilman, District 8
- Rey Saldaña, San Antonio City Councilman, District 4
- Ana Sandoval, San Antonio City Councilwoman, District 7
- San Antonio Express-News
- Stonewall Democrats of San Antonio
- Texas Democratic Party
- Texas Organizing Project

== Results ==
=== First round ===
On May 4, 2019, the election for Mayor was held. None of the leading candidates received more than 50% of the vote and as a result, a runoff election was scheduled for Saturday, June 8, 2019, between the top two vote-getters.

San Antonio Mayor, 2019 Regular election, May 4, 2019
Candidate		Votes	%	±
✓	Ron Nirenberg	49,579	48.67	
✓	Greg Brockhouse	46,414	45.56	
	John Velasquez	1,644	1.61	
	Antonio "Tony" Diaz	1,104	1.08	
	Tim Atwood	1,026	1.01	
	Matt Piña	762	0.75	
	Bert Cecconi	573	0.56	
	Michael "Commander" Idrogo	434	0.43	
	Carlos Castanuela	330	0.32	
Turnout		101,866	11.47*	+.15%

* Vote percentage includes all of Bexar County with a total of 8,496 either voting in another municipal election or casting no ballot for San Antonio mayor.

=== Runoff ===
On June 8, 2019, a runoff election was held between Nirenberg and Brockhouse. Nirenberg narrowly won the runoff with 51.11 percent of the votes, a margin of 2,690 votes.

San Antonio Mayor, 2019 Runoff election, June 8, 2019
Candidate		Votes	%	±
✓	Ron Nirenberg	61,741	51.11%	-3.48%
	Greg Brockhouse	59,051	48.89%	
Turnout		120,792	15.43%	+2.28%

Preceded by 2017	San Antonio Mayoral Election; 2019	Succeeded by 2021
