= 2021 San Antonio mayoral election =

- May 1, 2021
- Turnout: 17.26% ▲
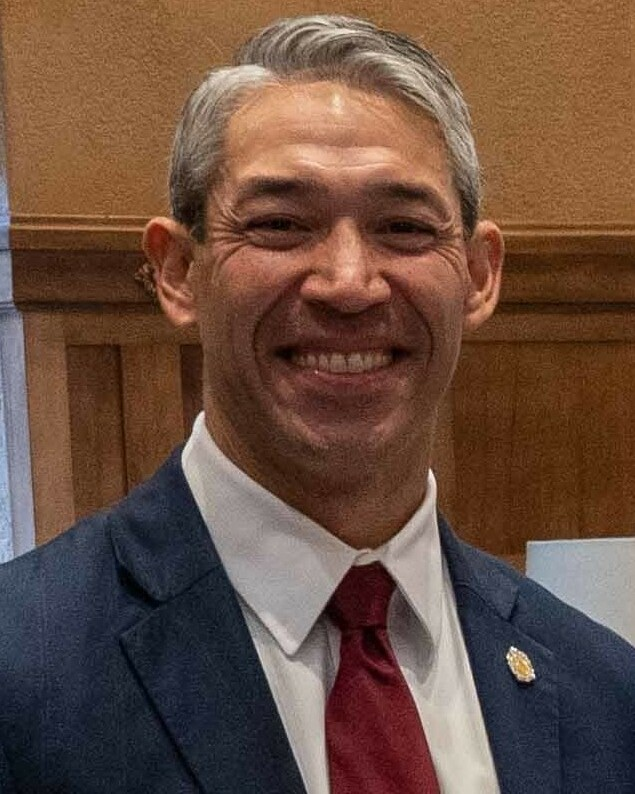

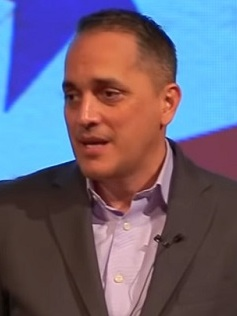
| Candidate | Ron Nirenberg | Greg Brockhouse |
| Popular vote | 92,067 | 46,808 |
| Percentage | 61.89% | 31.46% |
Mayor before election
Ron Nirenberg
Elected mayor
Ron Nirenberg

The 2021 San Antonio mayoral election was held on May 1, 2021 to decide the mayor of San Antonio, Texas. The election was a nonpartisan blanket primary election. The incumbent mayor Ron Nirenberg won a third two-year term.

== Background ==
In the 2017 San Antonio mayoral election, Nirenberg became the first person in twenty years to defeat an incumbent mayor when he defeated Ivy Taylor in a highly contested runoff election. During the 2019 San Antonio mayoral election, Nirenberg's progressive platform was challenged by Greg Brockhouse, a more conservative former San Antonio City Councilman. Brockhouse and Nirenberg advanced to a close runoff that Nirenberg won 51.11-48.89% with a margin of 2,690 votes.

== Candidates ==
=== Declared ===
A total of fourteen candidates submitted applications to be on the ballot for mayor. Names are listed in order as appearing on the ballot as per the City of San Antonio's City Elections site. A drawing was scheduled to be held on February 15, 2021, to determine the order of candidates on the ballot, but was rescheduled to February 22 as a result of the winter storm that affected the area. Due to their close runoff election in 2019, Nirenberg and Brockhouse were considered by political watchers to be the two primary candidates in the election.

- Jacq'ue Laurel "J." Miller, military employee
- Justin Macaluso, director of quality and manufacturing
- Gary Allen, retired teacher and candidate for Texas's 20th congressional district in 2020
- Frank Adam Muniz, lawyer
- Antonio "Tony" Diaz, perennial mayoral candidate
- Ron Nirenberg, incumbent mayor of San Antonio
- Michael "Commander" Idrogo, perennial mayoral candidate
- John M. Velasquez, psychologist
- Dan Martinez, retired
- Denise Gutierrez-Homer, interior designer, former teacher and candidate for the San Antonio City Council in 2019
- Greg Brockhouse, former San Antonio City Councilman and runoff-advanced candidate for mayor in 2019
- Ray Basaldua, small business owner
- Joshua James Galvan, self-employed stone care
- Tim Atwood, middle school teacher and candidate for mayor in 2019

=== Endorsements ===
Brockhouse
- Pastors PAC
Nirenberg
- Julian Castro, former Mayor of San Antonio, former United States Secretary of Housing and Urban Development, and candidate for the Democratic nomination for President of the United States in 2020.
- Nelson Wolff, former Mayor of San Antonio and current Bexar County Judge
- San Antonio Express-News

== Results ==
On May 1, 2021, the election for Mayor was held. Nirenberg began the voting with a large lead in early voting and went on to win the election with 61.89% of the vote. Because Nirenberg won with over 50% of the vote, no run-off election was necessary.

San Antonio Mayor, 2021 Regular election, May 1, 2021
| Candidate | | Votes | % | ± |
|---|---|---|---|---|
| ✓ | Ron Nirenberg | 92,067 | 61.89 | |
| | Greg Brockhouse | 46,808 | 31.46 | |
| | Denise Gutierrez-Homer | 2,709 | 1.82 | |
| | Gary Allen | 2,046 | 1.38 | |
| | Antonio "Tony" Diaz | 1,356 | 0.91 | |
| | Tim Atwood | 786 | 0.53 | |
| | J. Miller | 702 | 0.47 | |
| | Ray Basaldua | 631 | 0.42 | |
| | Michael "Commander" Idrogo | 406 | 0.27 | |
| | John M. Velasquez | 339 | 0.23 | |
| | Dan Martinez | 332 | 0.22 | |
| | Frank Adam Muniz | 208 | 0.14 | |
| | Justin Macaluso | 207 | 0.14 | |
| | Joshua James Galvan | 172 | 0.12 | |
| Turnout | | 148,769 | 17.26* | +5.79% |

* Vote percentage includes all of Bexar County with a total of 17,077 either voting in another municipal election or casting no ballot for San Antonio mayor.

| Preceded by 2019 | San Antonio Mayoral Election; 2021 | Succeeded by 2023 |
