= Gina Ortiz Jones =

American politician (born 1981)

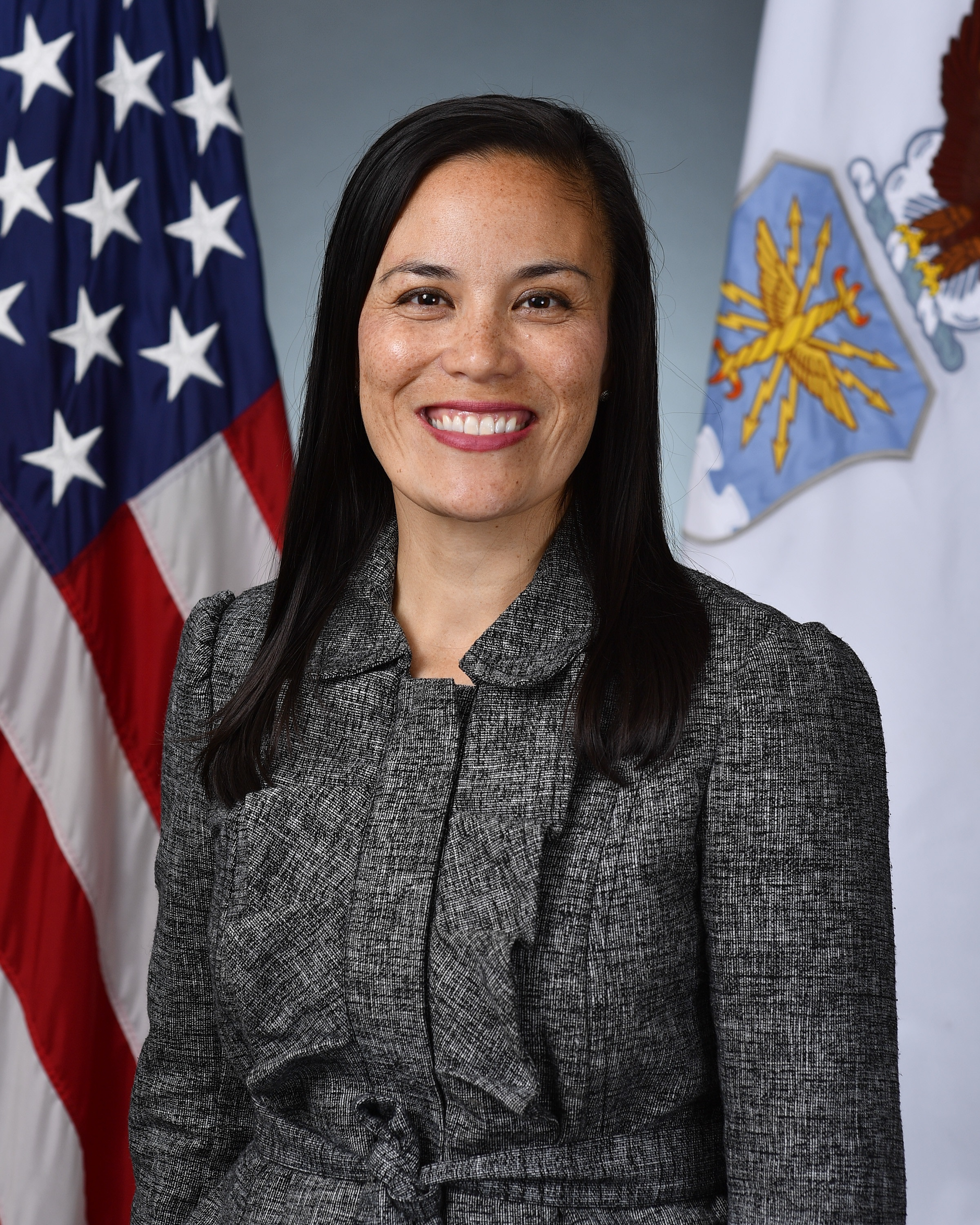
- Official portrait, 2021

184th Mayor of San Antonio
- Incumbent
- Assumed office June 18, 2025
- Preceded by: Ron Nirenberg

27th United States Under Secretary of the Air Force
- In office July 26, 2021 – March 6, 2023
- President: Joe Biden
- Preceded by: Matthew Donovan
- Succeeded by: Melissa Dalton

Personal details
- Born: February 1, 1981 (age 45) Arlington, Virginia, U.S.
- Party: Democratic
- Domestic partner: Angelica Cortez
- Education: Boston University (BA, MA); University of Kansas (MA); United States Army Command and General Staff College (MMAS)
- Website: Government website Campaign website

Military service
- Branch/service: United States Air Force
- Years of service: 2003–2006 (active); 2008–2010 (reserve)
- Rank: Captain
- Unit: 18th Air Support Operations Group
- Battles/wars: Iraq War

Gina Maria Ortiz Jones (born February 1, 1981) is an American politician and U.S. Air Force veteran serving as the 184th mayor of San Antonio, Texas, since 2025. A member of the Democratic Party, she previously served as Under Secretary of the Air Force from 2021 to 2023.

Jones was the 2018 Democratic nominee for Texas's 23rd congressional district, narrowly losing to the incumbent Republican Will Hurd. She ran again as the nominee for the seat in 2020, losing to Tony Gonzales in the general election. After her second loss, she served as Under Secretary of the Air Force in the Biden administration from 2021 to 2023.

She ran for mayor of San Antonio in the 2025 election, winning in a runoff. She is the first Asian-American female mayor of a major city in Texas, the first openly lesbian mayor of San Antonio, and the first female mayor in Texas to have served in war. Jones is also the first mayor since 2005 to have not previously served on San Antonio's city council.

== Early life and education ==
Born on February 1, 1981, in Arlington, Virginia, Jones grew up in San Antonio, Texas, as a first-generation American daughter of a single mother, Victorina Ortiz, an Ilocano from Pangasinan, Philippines. Her mother emigrated to the U.S. and earned a teaching certificate. Jones has a younger sister, Christi Ann.

Jones graduated from John Jay High School in 1999. She earned a four-year Air Force Reserve Officer Training Corps (AFROTC) scholarship, allowing her to enroll at Boston University. She graduated with a bachelor's degree in East Asian studies and economics and a master's degree in economics jointly in 2003. A lesbian who came out to her mother at 15, Jones served under the military's "don't ask, don't tell" policy, where she was at risk of losing her AFROTC scholarship if her sexual orientation was disclosed.

She later earned a master's degree in global and international studies from the University of Kansas in 2012 and another master's in military arts and sciences from the School of Advanced Military Studies at the United States Army Command and General Staff College in 2013.

== Early career ==
After graduating from college, Jones joined the United States Air Force, becoming an intelligence officer. She was later deployed to Iraq with the 18th Air Support Operations Group, supporting close air support operations. After three years of active duty and reaching the rank of captain, Jones returned to Texas in 2006, working for a consulting company while caring for her mother, who had colon cancer (from which she eventually recovered).

She then returned to working as an intelligence analyst for United States Africa Command in Germany. In 2008, Jones joined the Defense Intelligence Agency, where she specialized in Latin American topics; ultimately she became a special adviser to the deputy director. In November 2016, she moved to the Executive Office of the President to serve as a director in the Office of the United States Trade Representative. Having previously served under presidents of both parties, Jones continued in her role during the Trump administration until June 2017, when she left her role, telling HuffPost, "The type of people that were brought in to be public servants were interested in neither the public nor the service ... That, to me, was a sign that I'm going to have to serve in a different way." She returned to San Antonio to run for Congress, living in the house where she grew up.

=== Congressional campaigns ===
==== 2018 ====
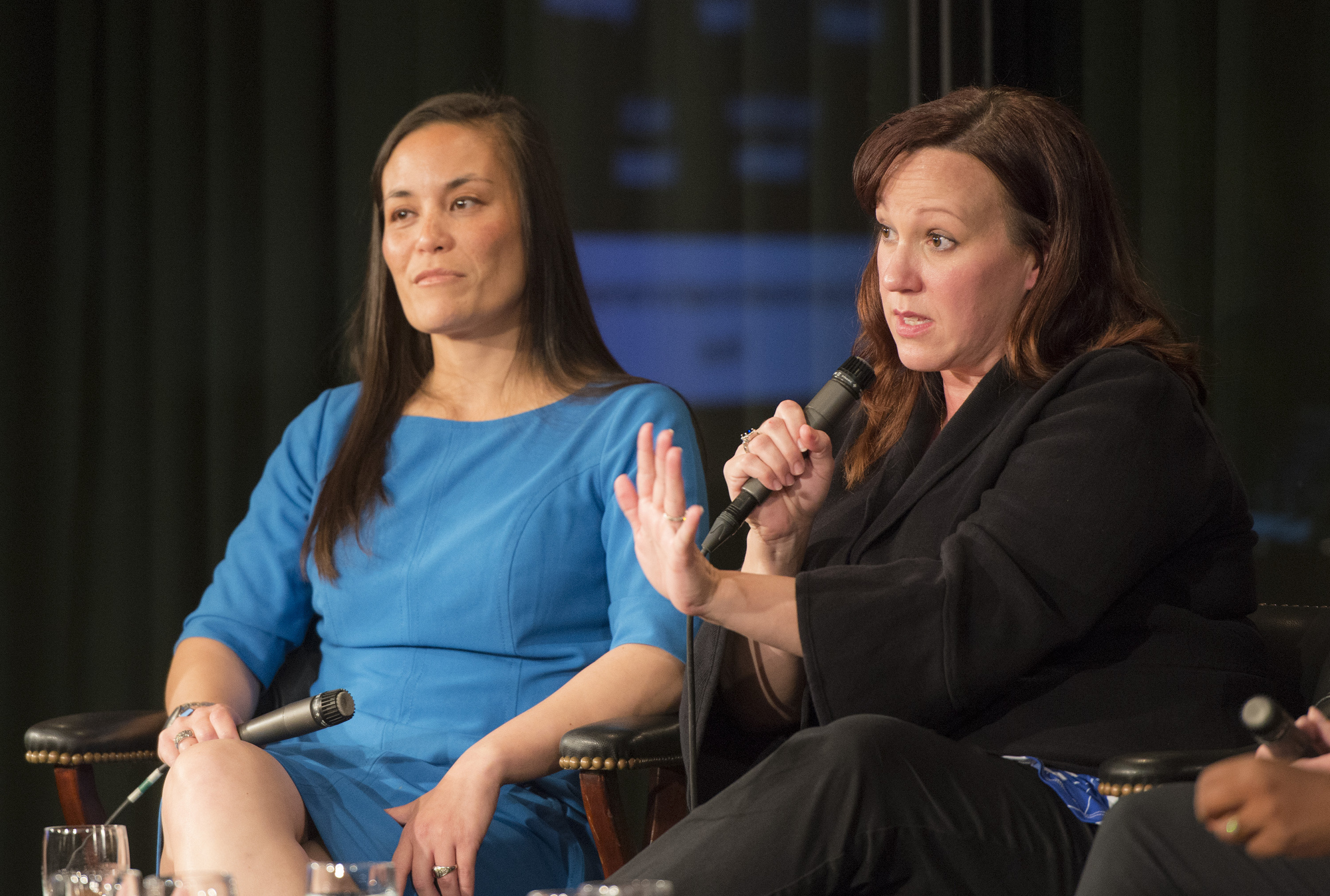
Jones with M. J. Hegar at a campaign event in 2018.

In 2017, Jones was the first Democrat to announce a challenge to Republican representative Will Hurd in Texas's predominantly Hispanic 23rd congressional district, which includes much of the border between Texas and Mexico. Hillary Clinton won the district by three points in the 2016 United States presidential election and neither party had controlled the swing district for more than two consecutive terms since 2007.

Jones finished first in the March 6, 2018, Democratic primary, earning 41 percent of the vote in a field of five. A runoff election was held on May 22, which Jones won. She faced Hurd in the November 6 general election, in what was called the most competitive congressional race in the state. As of June 30, Jones had raised $2.2 million while Hurd had raised $2.4 million in addition to the $1.5 million with which he entered the race. With four months remaining, Jones was approaching the district's record for election fundraising by a Democrat ($2.7 million).

Jones was endorsed by EMILY's List, the Asian American Action Fund, the Equality PAC, VoteVets, and the LGBTQ Victory Fund, as well as Wendy Davis and Khizr Khan.

Media coverage named Jones as part of several "waves" of candidates from various backgrounds running as Democrats in 2018, including women, LGBT people, and military veterans. A March 2018 Teen Vogue article noted that if elected, Jones would be "the first openly lesbian woman of color from Texas elected to Congress, as well as the first Iraq War veteran to represent Texas in Congress. She'd also be the first woman to represent Texas's 23rd Congressional district."

Jones said she believed health care reform would play a big role in the election. She and Hurd both broke fundraising records.

Jones lost to Hurd by 1,150 votes and conceded on November 19.

==== 2020 ====
In May 2019, Jones launched a second campaign for Texas's 23rd congressional district. She has raised over $1 million for her campaign, including $100,000 in the 24 hours following Hurd's August 2019 announcement that he would not seek reelection. In October 2019 The Texas Tribune reported that she was the primary front-runner. In May 2020, former presidential candidate Pete Buttigieg's Win the Era PAC endorsed Jones.

In the November general election, Republican nominee Tony Gonzales defeated Jones 51% to 47%.

=== Under Secretary of the Air Force ===
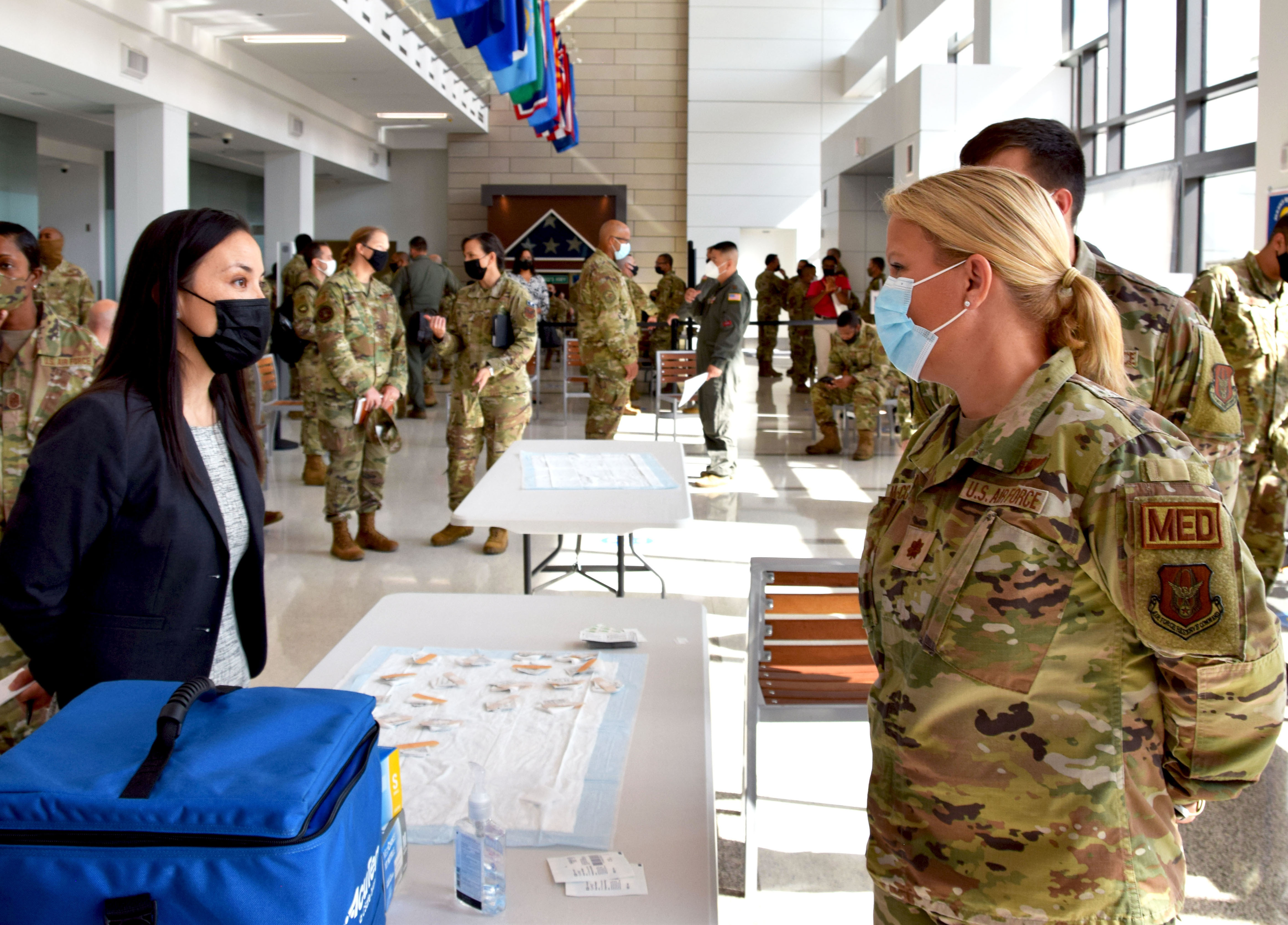
Jones meeting with members of the 433rd Airlift Wing at Joint Base San Antonio in 2021.

Jones was confirmed as President Biden's Under Secretary of the Air Force by the Senate on July 22, 2021. She was the sixth woman to hold that title, the first woman of color and the first open lesbian. In that post her responsibilities included personnel management. She managed the implementation of a revised policy governing when pregnant service member can fly in place of the service's total prohibition on flying while pregnant. Pregnant service members were no longer required to wait a year from the end of a pregnancy to apply to Air Force Officer Training School, but could apply while pregnant. She enhanced services for victims of domestic abuse and produced a study to provide senior leadership with better data on the performance of female officers, countering anecdotal disparagement of their record.

She resigned as under secretary in February 2023, effective March 6.

=== Find Out PAC ===
Jones leads Find Out PAC, a political action committee seeking to defeat Texas Supreme Court justices Jimmy Blacklock, Jane Bland and John Devine, who were running for re-election in the 2024 Texas judicial elections, because of their decision in Cox v. Texas. All three justices were re-elected to 6-year terms. Blacklock was appointed Chief justice following his victory.

== Mayor of San Antonio ==
=== 2025 election ===
In December 2024, Jones announced her candidacy for the mayor of San Antonio, Texas. She joined a crowded field of candidates due to incumbent mayor Ron Nirenberg being term-limited. On May 3, 2025, Jones would advance to the runoff election after winning 27.2% of the vote. She received most of her campaign funding from out of state donors, and used funds from her previous congressional campaigns as an initial contribution. She won with 54.3% of the vote.

=== Tenure ===
Jones was sworn in as mayor on June 18, 2025.

In February 2026, councilwoman Sukh Kaur filed a complaint with the City Attorney's Office, alleging that Jones shouted and cursed at her after a City Council meeting regarding the Bonham Exchange, a nightclub located in Kaur's district. After an independent investigation found that Jones had violated the City Council code of conduct regarding workplace harassment, she issued a public apology to Kaur and the other council members, stating that "I have a different set of experiences that allow me to view things a little bit differently than some of my colleagues." On February 27, the council voted 8–1 to formally censure Jones, believing that her actions in the incident had risen to the level of workplace violence.

== Personal life ==
Jones has a younger sister who is an intelligence officer in the United States Navy. She identifies as an Ilocano, a Filipino ethnolinguistic group. Her romantic partner is Angelica Cortez. Cortez accompanied Jones to her evening inauguration ceremony on June 18, 2025.

In 2026, Jones was a recipient of the Torchbearer "Carrying Change" Awards' Illuminator Award.

== See also ==
- List of first openly LGBTQ politicians in the United States

Political offices
| Preceded by Matthew Donovan | United States Under Secretary of the Air Force; 2021–2023 | Succeeded by Melissa Dalton |
| Preceded by Ron Nirenberg | Mayor of San Antonio; 2025–present | Incumbent |
