= Texas State Teachers Association =

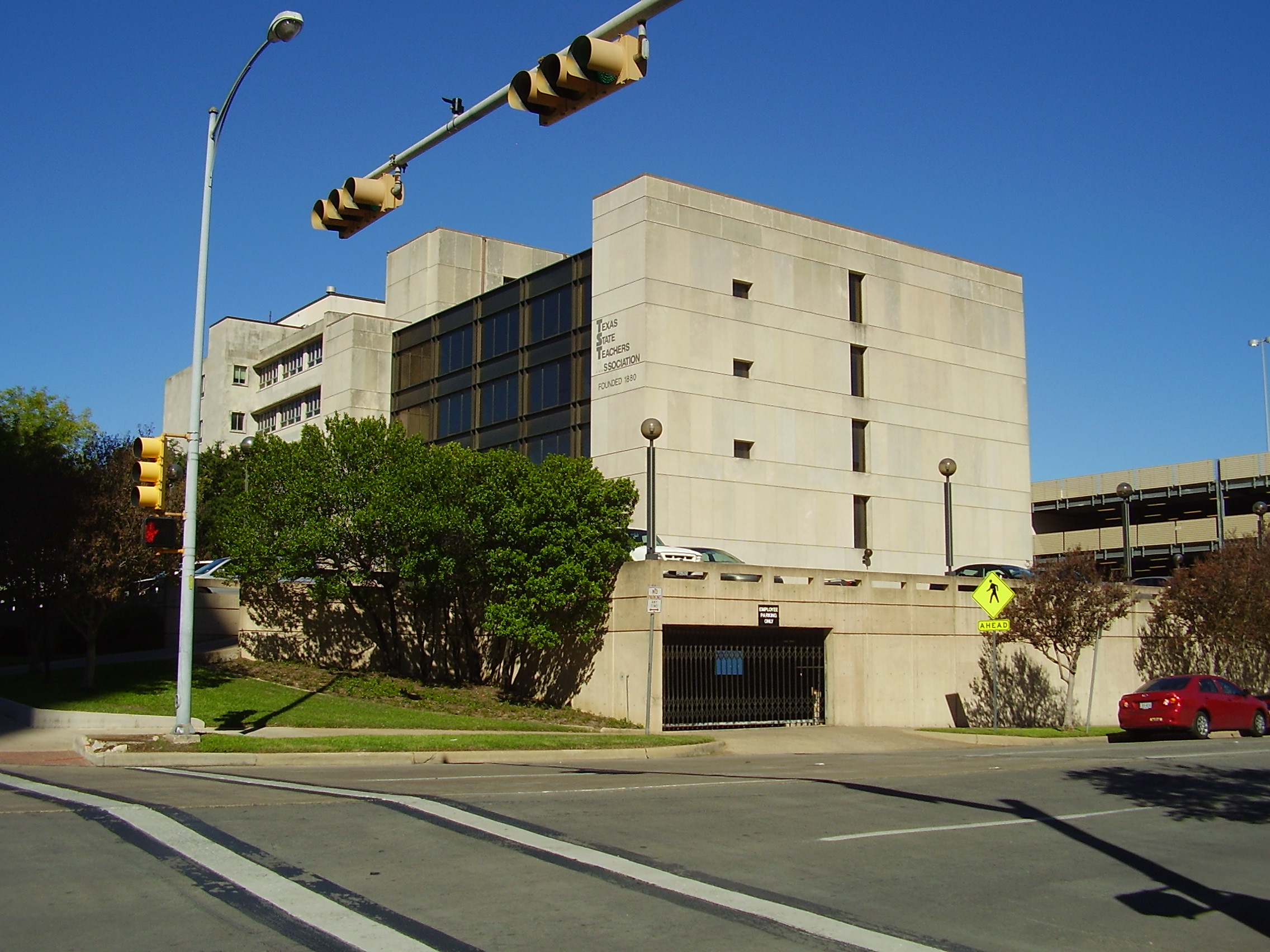
- Former TSTA headquarters in Austin
- Abbreviation: TSTA
- Formation: June 29, 1880; 146 years ago
- Founded at: Mexia, Texas, U.S.
- Type: Nonprofit
- Headquarters: Austin, Texas, U.S.
- Region served: Texas
- President: Linda Estrada
- Affiliations: National Education Association
- Website: tsta.org

The Texas State Teachers Association (TSTA) is a teacher's trade union based in Austin in the U.S. state of Texas. Founded in 1880, it is the oldest education organization in the state. The association is affiliated with the National Education Association (NEA). TSTA is led by a full-time state president and vice president, a board of directors, and a democratically elected House of Delegates.

== History ==
The Texas State Teachers Association was first organized on June 29, 1880, in Mexia, as the result of a merger between the Austin Teachers Association, founded in 1871, and the North Texas Teachers Association, founded in 1877. J. R. Malone, the president of the North Texas Teachers Association, became the first president of the TSTA.

TSTA affiliated with the Washington, D.C.-based National Education Association in 1975.

== The Advocate ==
The Advocate is the TSTA's official publication. Originally named the Texas Outlook, the publication was a quarterly bulletin that was printed in 1917. In the 1980s, the TSTA changed the name to the Advocate.
