= Sylvia Romo =

American politician in Texas

Sylvia S. Romo (San Antonio, Texas) is the former Tax Assessor-Collector for Bexar County, Texas. Bexar County is the 19th most populous in the U.S., with a 2010 census of over 1.7 million people and a taxing budget of over 2 billion dollars. She is the first elected female and Latina to hold this position.

Romo had previously served two terms in the Texas House of Representatives from 1992 to 1996 from Texas District 125 where she authored 68 and co-authored 22 Texas house bills respectively as an advocate for small business and minority issues. She sponsored additional house bills during her two terms. Romo had previously served as the chairwoman for the Bexar County Democratic party.

Romo is a Texas-certified CPA, graduating from the University of Texas, San Antonio with a B.A. in Business Administration. In 2012, she unsuccessfully sought the Democratic party's nomination for U.S. Congresswoman from the newly created 35th congressional district of Texas, considered a bellwether district for the national elections and one in which she was born and raised.
