= Lyle Larson =

Texas state legislator

Member of the Texas House of Representatives from the 122nd district
- In office January 11, 2011 – January 10, 2023
- Preceded by: Frank Corte Jr.
- Succeeded by: Mark Dorazio

Member of the San Antonio City Council
- In office 1991–1995

Personal details
- Born: March 25, 1959 (age 67) San Antonio, Texas, U.S.
- Party: Republican
- Education: Texas A&M University (BBA)

Lyle Thomas Larson (born March 25, 1959) is an American politician and businessman who served as a Republican member of the Texas House of Representatives for the 122nd district from 2011 to 2023. He was first elected to the state House in 2010 to succeed fellow Republican Frank Corte Jr.

== Early life and education ==
Larson was raised on a family farm at Thousand Oaks and Jones-Maltsberger Road; the location is now heavily urbanized. When his parents divorced, he lived with his father, a large animal veterinarian. He has a twin sister and four siblings. His sisters went to live with their mother when the parents' marriage ended. While working on the farm, Larson contracted paratyphoid from handling feed for hogs and not washing his hands before eating. He played defensive end in football at Douglas MacArthur High School in the North East Independent School District, from which he graduated in 1977. In 1981, he obtained a Bachelor of Business Administration degree from Texas A&M University.

== Career ==
Prior to starting his own company, American Consortium, which distributes industrial products for Polaroid, he worked for Nalco Chemical Company and Johnson & Johnson.

=== Texas House of Representatives ===
During his tenure in the House, Larson was an ally of Speaker Joe Straus, also of San Antonio. The two men are the same age, and their family connections go back for four decades. Larson's father provided care for the horses and cattle on the Straus farms. But Larson said in an interview that "sometimes" Straus "doesn't quite understand me."

After the 2017 regular session of the legislature, Governor Greg Abbott vetoed five of Larson's bills, including measures dealing with brackish water and desalination efforts. Another Larson measure which would have prevented a governor from appointing members to a state board or commission if the nominee had donated $2,500 or more to the governor's previous campaign passed the House, 91-48, but it received no hearing in the Texas State Senate. Another Larson bill which would ensured that a parent has the right to view the body of a deceased child before the performance of an autopsy was vetoed because Abbott said that he had already signed a measure with identical language authored by Republican State Senator Donna Campbell of New Braunfels. Larson said that he believes Abbott "lacks maturity [and] can't separate policy and politics."

On the eve of the special legislative session of 2017, Larson continued to express frustration with Governor Abbott: "The reality is, since the governor skipped class for four months, we've got ... summer school with him now to help him learn what we did." Larson said that he is unlikely to serve in the state House much past 2020: "My ambitions are just to try to do the right thing. ... And then leave everything on the field, then walk away."

Despite his squabbles with Governor Abbott, Larson won re-nomination over a conservative intra-party challenger, Mayor Christopher Michael "Chris" Fails of Hollywood Park in Bexar County. On November 6, 2018, he was reelected with 58,062 votes (62 percent) to 35,577 ballots (38 percent) for his Democratic opponent, Claire Barnett.

Larson has been characterized as a moderate Republican.

=== Ethics controversy ===
Larson caused controversy within his own party after accusing Governor Abbott of quid pro quo, or "pay for play", politics. According to Larson, people "have to pay large sums of money" for state seats. However, opponents of Larson's comments were quick to cite the fact that Abbott has appointed 21 people from the 122nd district to positions on boards, including Larson himself who was named to the Southwestern States Water Commission. Of these 21 people, none of them gave more than $5000. Greg Abbott responded by saying, "Mr. Larson's fabricated comments are an embarrassment for someone who claims to be a champion of ethics reform. His comments are a disservice to his constituents, and even more so to the appointees from his district who selflessly serve the state of Texas".

== Personal life ==
Larson married and divorced right out of college. He is a member of the United Methodist Church. Larson is also a quail hunter and bass fisherman. San Antonio International Ag Promotions, which he founded, hosts such trade expositions as the San Antonio International Farm and Ranch Show and the Texas Hunting and Outdoor Classic. He takes an annual fishing trip to Lake Michigan with friends from high school and college.

Texas House of Representatives
Preceded by Frank Corte Jr.	Texas State Representative for District 122 (Bexar County); 2011–	Succeeded by Incumbent
