= 2017 San Antonio mayoral election =

- May 6, 2017 (first round); June 10, 2017 (runoff)
- Turnout: 11.32% ▼(first round); 13.16% ▲ (runoff)
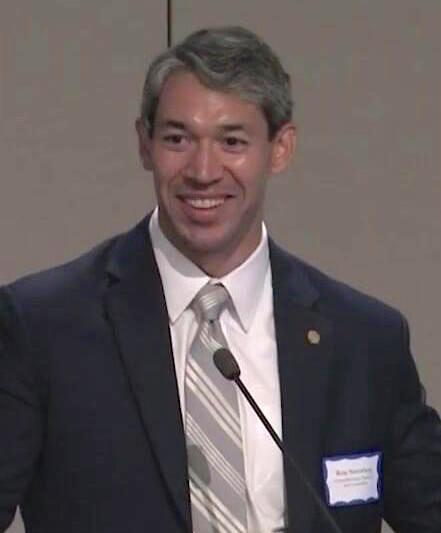

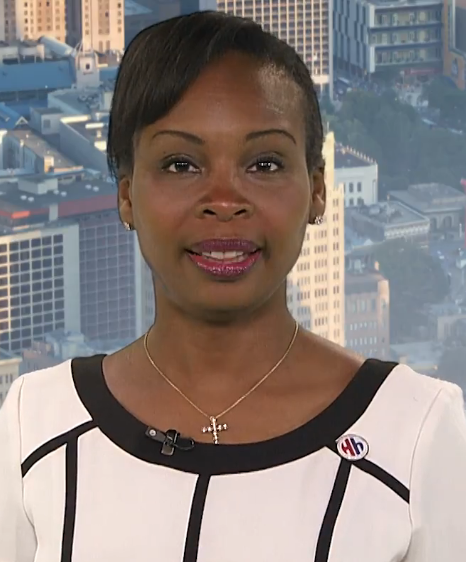

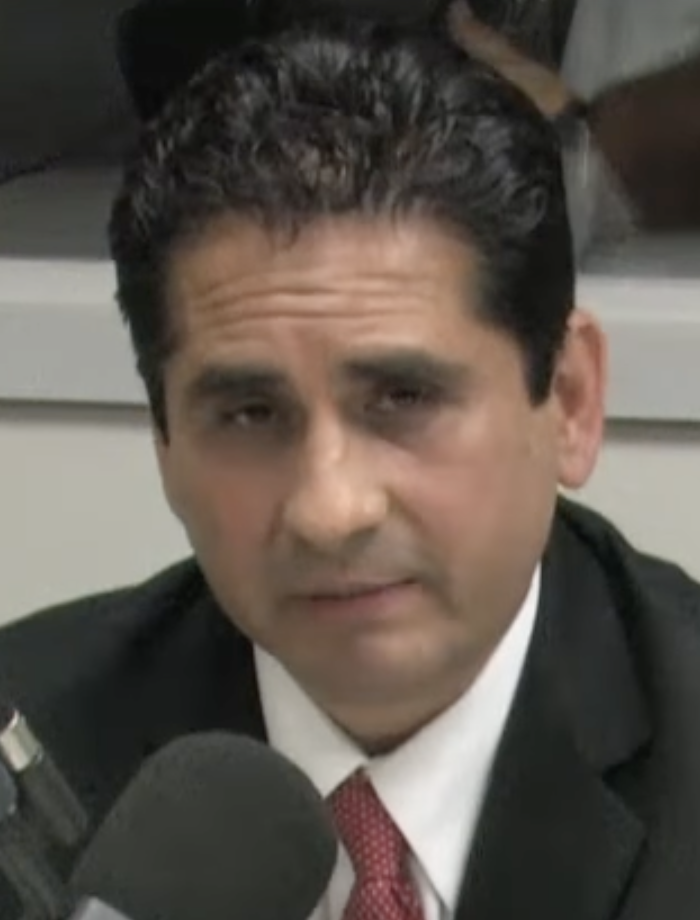
Candidate	Ron Nirenberg	Ivy Taylor	Manuel Medina
First round	36,887; 37.08%	41,788; 42.01%	15,049; 15.13%
Runoff	54,020; 54.60%	44,922; 45.40%	Eliminated
Mayor before election
Ivy Taylor
Elected mayor
Ron Nirenberg

On May 6, 2017, the city of San Antonio, Texas held an election to choose the next mayor of San Antonio. The election was officially nonpartisan, with candidates' party affiliations not appearing on the ballot. As no candidate secured a majority of the vote (50% of all votes cast +1), a runoff was held on June 10, 2017, with Councilman Ron Nirenberg defeating incumbent mayor Ivy Taylor.

Simultaneous elections to the city council as well as various area bond programs were held on the same date.

== Background ==
Julian Castro, who was elected mayor in the 2009 San Antonio mayoral election, resigned in 2014 to become the United States Secretary of Housing and Urban Development. Ivy Taylor was selected by the San Antonio City Council as Castro's successor. Taylor successfully ran for re-election as mayor in the 2015 San Antonio mayoral election.

On November 13, 2016, Taylor officially announced her candidacy for a second full term as mayor. City Councilman Ron Nirenberg became the first challenger to Taylor, announcing his candidacy on December 10, 2016. The chairman of the Bexar County Democratic Party, Manuel Medina, announced his candidacy on January 7, 2017. District 4 City Councilman Rey Saldaña, a potential candidate, opted to run for a fourth term to the city council rather than mayor.

== Candidates ==
A total of 14 citizens submitted applications to be on the ballot for mayor. Taylor, Medina, and Nirenberg were identified as the primary three candidates in the election.

=== Declared ===
- Antonio "Tony" Diaz
- Felicio Hernandez Flores II
- Michael "Commander" Idrogo
- Stephen Lucke
- Napoleon Madrid
- Will McLeod
- Manuel Medina, former chairman of the Bexar County Democratic Party
- Ron Nirenberg, District 8 City Councilman
- Julie Iris "Mama Bexar" Oldham
- Gerard Xavier Ponce
- Keven Roles
- Rhett Smith
- Ivy Taylor, incumbent mayor of San Antonio and former city councilwoman
- John Martin Velasquez

=== Endorsements ===
Italicized individuals and organizations are post-regular election endorsements.

Medina
- Diana Arévalo, Texas State Representative District 116
- Lourdes Galvan, former city councilwoman, District 5
- Albert Uresti, Bexar County Tax Assessor-Collector
- Bexar County Democratic Party
- San Antonio Professional Firefighters Association
Nirenberg
- Maria Berriozábal, former city councilwoman, District 1
- Julian Castro, former U.S. Secretary of Housing and Urban Development and Mayor of San Antonio
- Rosie Castro, mother of former Mayor Julian Castro and Congressman Joaquin Castro
- Linda Chavez-Thompson, former executive vice president of the AFL-CIO and 2010 Democratic nominee for Texas lieutenant governor
- Bonnie Connor, former city councilwoman, District 8
- Phil Hardberger, former mayor of San Antonio
- Sierra Club of Texas
Taylor
- Tommy Adkisson, former Bexar County commissioner and 2015 mayoral candidate
- Ernesto Ancira, president of local car company Ancira Enterprises and treasurer of Taylor's campaign
- Hope Andrade, former Texas secretary of state
- Trish DeBerry, president of DeBerry Group and 2009 mayoral candidate
- Brian Dillard, president of the Dignowity Hill Neighborhood Association
- Mike Gallagher, former city councilman, District 10
- Joe Krier, former city councilman, District 9
- Lyle Larson, Republican member of the Texas House of Representatives
- Ray Lopez, former city councilman, District 6
- Cris Medina, former city councilman, District 7
- Leticia Van de Putte, former state senator and 2015 mayoral candidate
- Rebecca Viagran, current city councilwoman, District 3
- Kevin Wolff, Bexar County commissioner, Precinct 3
- Nelson Wolff, Bexar County judge and former mayor of San Antonio
- San Antonio Express-News

=== Polling ===
Poll source	Date(s) administered	Ivy Taylor	Ron Nirenberg	Manuel Medina	Other/ undecided
Baselice & Associates^{1}	March 9–12, 2017	53%	16%	13%	18%

- ^1Poll for the Ivy Taylor campaign

== Results ==
=== First round ===
On May 6, 2017, the election for mayor was held. None of the leading candidates received more than 50% of the vote, and, as a result, a runoff election was scheduled for Saturday, June 10, 2017 between the top two vote-getters.

San Antonio mayor, 2017 Regular election, May 6, 2017
Candidate		Votes	%	±
✓	Ivy Taylor	41,794	42.01%	
✓	Ron Nirenberg	36,890	37.08%	
	Manuel Medina	15,049	15.13%	
	Keven Roles	1,557	1.57%	
	Antonio "Tony" Diaz	966	0.97%	
	Will McLeod	545	0.55%	
	Felicio Hernandez Flores II	429	0.43%	
	John Martin Velasquez	383	0.39%	
	Michael "Commander" Idrogo	366	0.37%	
	Gerard Xavier Ponce	366	0.37%	
	Rhett Smith	321	0.32%	
	Stephen Lucke	315	0.32%	
	Julie Iris "Mama Bexar" Oldham	270	0.27%	
	Napoleon Madrid	225	0.23%	
Turnout		99,467	11.32%	

* Vote percentage includes all of Bexar County with a total of 16,745 either voting in another municipal election or casting no ballot for San Antonio mayor.

=== Runoff ===
The runoff election between the top two candidates was held on Saturday, June 10, 2017. 230 fewer people voted in the runoff than in the first round. This was the third consecutive runoff election in which the runner-up in the first round went on to win in the runoff. This was also the first election in twenty years in which the incumbent mayor of San Antonio sought re-election and lost; Bill Thornton had sought re-election in 1997 but failed to qualify for the runoff (Thornton was ultimately succeeded by Howard Peak).

San Antonio mayor, 2017 Runoff election June 10, 2017
Candidate		Votes	%	±
✓	Ron Nirenberg	54,020	54.6	
	Ivy Taylor	44,922	45.4	
Turnout		98,942	13.16%	
