= Ron Nirenberg =

American politician (born 1977)

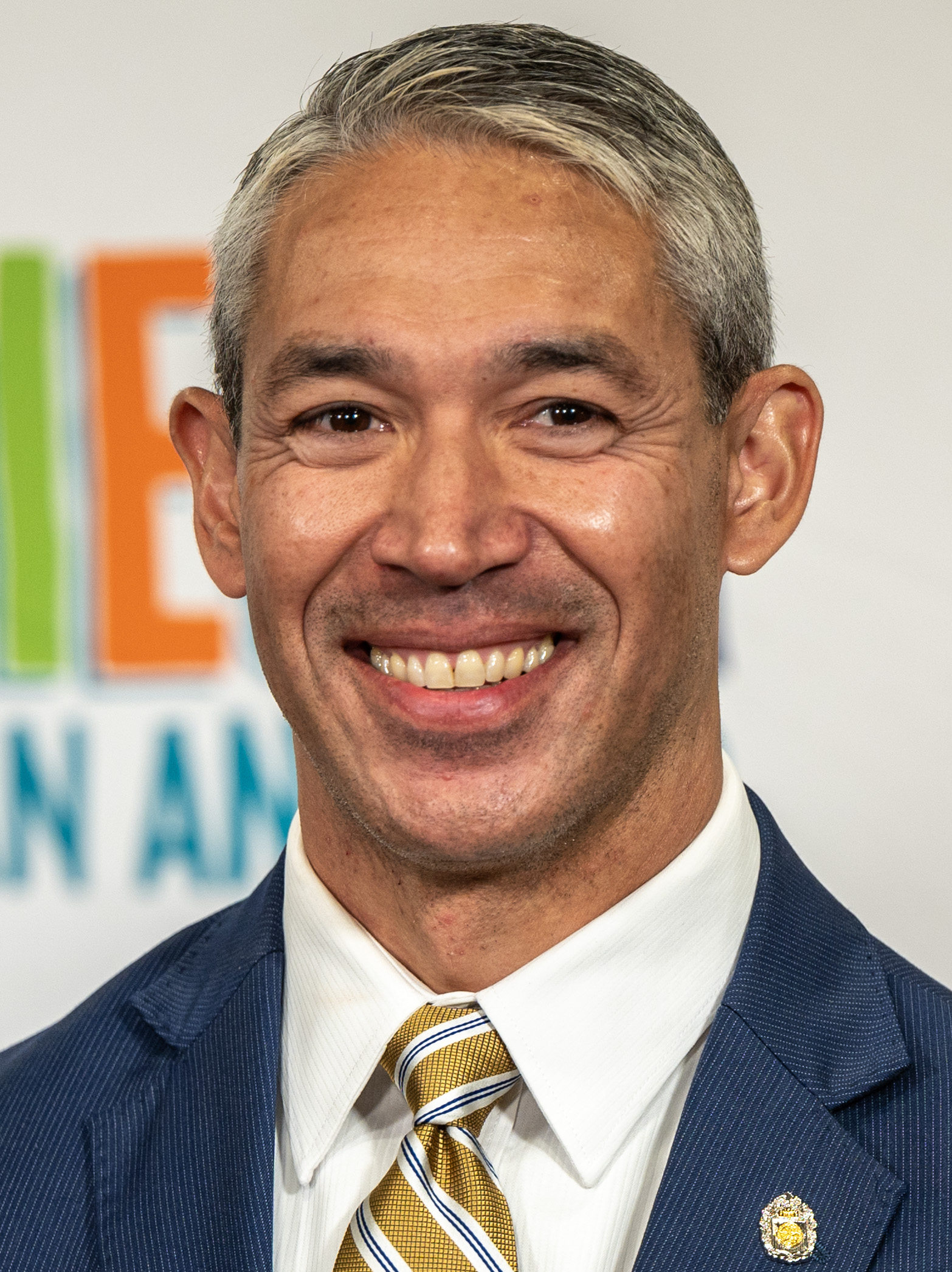
- Nirenberg in 2024

Mayor of San Antonio
- In office June 21, 2017 – June 18, 2025
- Preceded by: Ivy Taylor
- Succeeded by: Gina Ortiz Jones

Member of the San Antonio City Council from the 8th district
- In office July 1, 2013 – June 21, 2017
- Preceded by: Reed Williams
- Succeeded by: Manny Pelaez

Personal details
- Born: Ronald Adrian Nirenberg; April 11, 1977 (age 49) Boston, Massachusetts, U.S.
- Party: Independent (before 2024); Democratic (2024–present)
- Spouse: Erika Prosper (m. 2001)
- Children: 1
- Education: Trinity University (BA); University of Pennsylvania (MA)
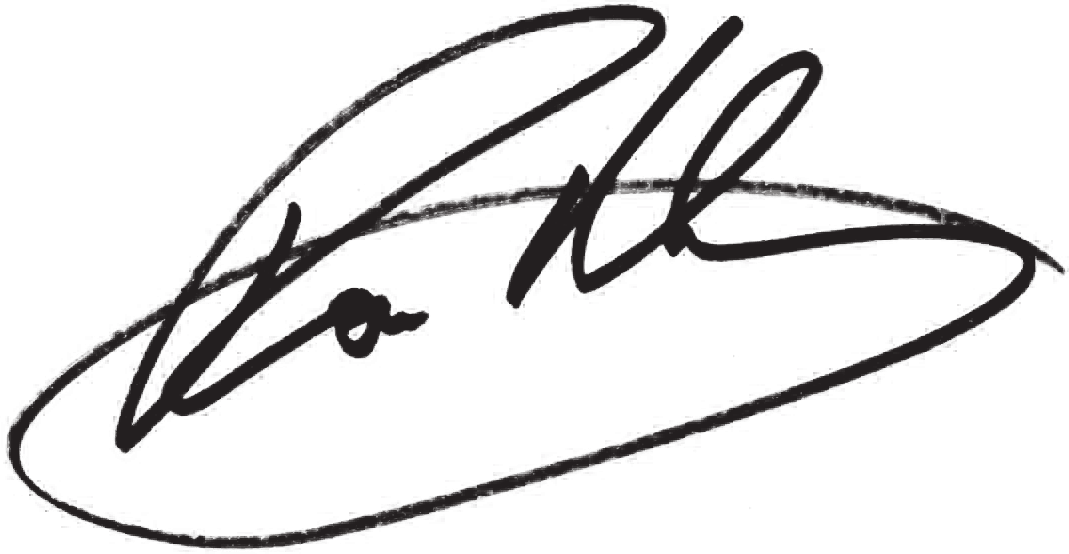
- Signature
- Website: Campaign website

Ronald Adrian Nirenberg (born April 11, 1977) is an American politician who served as the mayor of San Antonio, Texas between 2017 and 2025. Prior to his election, Nirenberg served as a member of the San Antonio City Council for District 8 for two terms.

In 2013, Nirenberg was first elected in an upset victory to represent District 8 of the San Antonio City Council. Nirenberg was elected mayor in 2017, defeating incumbent Ivy Taylor, and was sworn in on June 21, 2017. He was narrowly re-elected in 2019 over Greg Brockhouse, a city councilman critical of his policies. In the 2021 mayoral election, again facing Brockhouse, Nirenberg won with 61.89% of the vote. In the 2023 mayoral election, Nirenberg won his fourth and final election as mayor, with unofficial results of over 61% of the vote.

== Early life and education ==
Nirenberg is of Ashkenazi Jewish descent (from Poland and Russia) on his father's side (Note: Jewish ancestry only comes from the birth mother.) and of mixed Filipino, Indian, and British heritage from his mother's side. Nirenberg's mother and father met while his father was serving with the Peace Corps in Malaysia. His paternal grandparents immigrated to the United States before World War II, passing through Ellis Island. His Roman Catholic mother is half-Filipino and was born in Penang, Malaysia (then part of the colonial British protectorate of Malaya). His maternal grandmother was Anglo-Indian, born to a Scottish father and an Indian mother, while his maternal grandfather was a Tagalog-speaking Filipino musician with possible roots in Mindanao. Nirenberg, who is Methodist, was raised in Austin, Texas.

Nirenberg attended Trinity University in San Antonio and graduated summa cum laude with a Bachelor of Arts in communication. He later attended the University of Pennsylvania, from which he earned his Master of Arts in communications. After college, he was a program director for the Annenberg Public Policy Center in Philadelphia, Pennsylvania and served as the General Manager of KRTU-FM, the radio station at Trinity University.

== Electoral history ==
=== 2013 San Antonio City Council, District 8 race ===
In his 2013 run for District 8 of the San Antonio City Council, Nirenberg was considered the underfunded candidate unlikely to be successful that was challenging a well-funded establishment candidate, Rolando Briones. Nirenberg had run a grassroots campaign that consisted primarily of volunteers, including college students and recent graduates. Nonetheless, Nirenberg was victorious winning nearly 55% of the votes cast in the runoff election.

=== 2017 San Antonio mayoral race ===
On December 10, 2016, Nirenberg became the leading challenger to Ivy Taylor for her position as mayor of San Antonio. On May 6, 2017, the first round of voting was held, with no candidate reaching the required majority of 50% of the vote. Nirenberg and Taylor finished with the two highest vote totals and advanced to a runoff election held June 10, 2017. Although Nirenberg trailed Taylor in the first municipal election, he went on to defeat Taylor 54.59–45.41% in the runoff election. In so doing, Nirenberg became the first person in twenty years to defeat an incumbent mayor of San Antonio who sought re-election.

=== 2019 San Antonio mayoral race ===
Nirenberg declared his candidacy for re-election to the office on January 29, 2019. His main opponent was identified as Greg Brockhouse, a member of the San Antonio City Council who also took office in 2017 and frequently objected to Nirenberg's platform. The election was scheduled for May 4, 2019, but since no majority was reached by any candidate, a runoff election was held on June 8. In the runoff, Nirenberg was elected to a second term, defeating Brockhouse by a 51.11% to 48.89% final vote.

=== 2021 San Antonio mayoral race ===
Nirenberg declared his candidacy for re-election for a third term in office on January 22, 2021. The election was held on May 1, 2021. Due to the close runoff in 2019 between Nirenberg and Brockhouse, they were considered by political watchers to be the two front-runner candidates in the election. Nirenberg won his third term as mayor with 61.89% of the vote, while Brockhouse received 31.26%.

=== 2023 San Antonio mayoral race ===
Nirenberg declared his candidacy for re-election for a fourth term in office on January 26, 2023. Due to term limits if Nirenberg won, it would be his last term. Nirenberg faced minimal opposition and was expected to win re-election. On May 6, 2023, Nirenberg was re-elected with an unofficial count of over 61% of the vote.

=== 2026 Bexar County Judicial Race ===
Nirenberg announced he would run for the office of Bexar county judge on November 15, 2025. He defeated the incumbent, Peter Sakai, in the Democratic primary vote held in March 2026 with 62% of the vote.

== Tenure ==
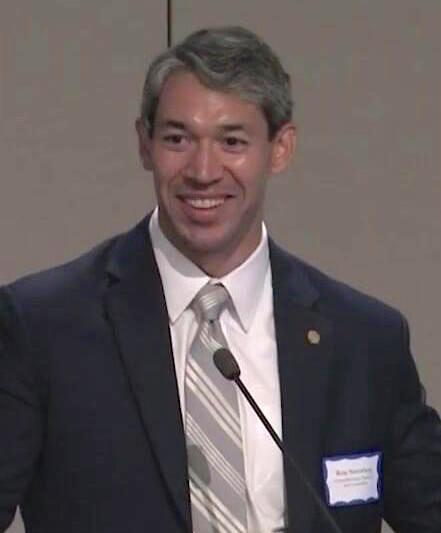
Nirenberg as a city councilman, 2015.

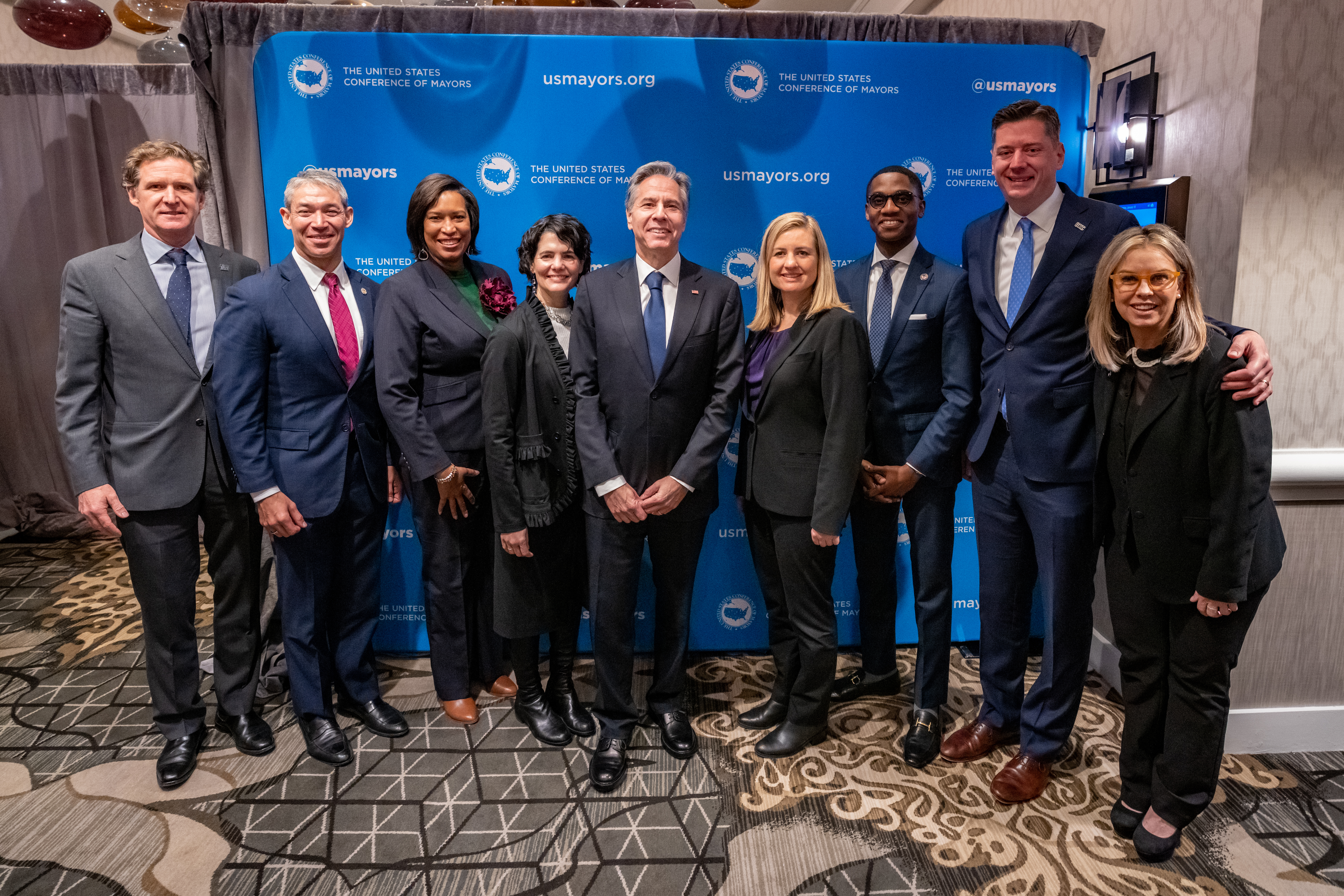
Nirenberg (second from left) with Secretary of State Antony Blinken at the 2023 United States Conference of Mayors

Nirenberg identified as an independent for most of his mayorship and ran for office on a nonpartisan ballot. (Note: In Texas, all municipal elections are officially nonpartisan) However, he was considered to be ideologically progressive throughout his tenure. In 2024, he started publicly identifying as a Democrat.

In 2013, Nirenberg endorsed a city ordinance that bans discrimination based on gender identity and sexual orientation. Taylor, then also a member of the city council, voted against the ordinance. Taylor also opposed the city's filing of a lawsuit against a then-new state law that defines a misdemeanor offense for municipal officials who refuse to cooperate with federal authorities seeking to halt illegal immigration. Signed by Governor Greg Abbott, the law targets the sanctuary city movement. Nirenberg, conversely, backed the lawsuit. As mayor-elect, Nirenberg called upon the city council to endorse the Paris climate accord even though U.S. President Donald Trump had announced plans to remove the United States from the agreement. The San Antonio City Council approved a resolution to sign the Paris climate accord one day after Nirenberg's election, and, in November 2017, the City Council approved the creation of a Climate Action and Adaptation Plan. This would lead to San Antonio being one of 25 cities awarded the American Cities Climate Challenge grant in 2019 by Michael Bloomberg.

In 2019, Nirenberg supported and defended the move to have a Chick-fil-A restaurant removed from the concessions contract at the San Antonio International Airport, citing a conflict with the company's opposition to LGBTQ rights and that the company's closure on Sunday, done on religious grounds, would hurt revenue. The move faced controversy and national condemnation from conservatives. Councilman Greg Brockhouse opposed this decision and called for a re-vote on the decision but it was defeated. Texas Attorney General Ken Paxton later began an investigation on the actions of Nirenberg and the San Antonio City Council, claiming that the decision was in violation of existing Texas laws, the U.S. Constitution, and even San Antonio's own ethics code. The Federal Aviation Administration (FAA) also opened an investigation on this action. On June 10, 2019, Texas governor Greg Abbott signed into law Senate Bill 1978, colloquially known as the "Save Chick-fil-A Bill", which forbids local governments from taking adverse steps against companies or individuals based on their religious beliefs.

On March 18, 2020, Nirenberg issued an order for the temporary closure of all non-essential businesses in response to the COVID-19 pandemic, making San Antonio the last major city in Texas to do so. In 2021, Nirenberg criticized Texas Governor Greg Abbott's lifting of COVID-19 mandates and prohibition on local governments from being able to make their own, saying the governor was showing "callous disregard for life." The City of San Antonio, led by Nirenberg, and Bexar County sued Abbott in Bexar County court to temporarily block his executive order barring local mandates. A Bexar County judge issued the restraining order on Abbott's executive order, reinstating Nirenberg's mask mandate; a ruling that he applauded. The Supreme Court of Texas would later block Nirenberg's mask mandate.

Nirenberg has overseen implementation of two separate job-training programs. In 2020, he launched Train for Jobs SA, funded by $65 million from the City of San Antonio. By the end of 2021, 888 Train for Jobs participants had been placed in jobs. Its $200 successor program, Ready to Work, funded through a sales tax, has been in effect since 2021 and had placed 665 program participants in jobs by April 2024. In his 2024 State of the City speech, he stated that by implementing this program the city was "creating a coordinated workforce development ecosystem at a scale unparalleled in our city's history."

Upon the completion of his fourth term, Nirenberg became among the longest serving mayors of San Antonio, and the longest since Mayor Henry Cisneros, who left office in 1989.

== Personal life ==
Nirenberg married Erika Prosper in 2001. Erika is the director of customer insights for H-E-B. The couple has one son. Nirenberg was formerly a competitive bodybuilder and powerlifter.

== See also ==
- List of mayors of the 50 largest cities in the United States

== Notes ==
Political offices
Preceded by Ivy Taylor	Mayor of San Antonio; 2017–2025	Succeeded by Gina Ortiz Jones
