= Texas's 122nd House of Representatives district =

American legislative district

Texas's 122nd State House of Representatives district
Representative
Mark Dorazio; R–San Antonio
- Demographics: 48.6% White; 5.8% Black; 37.4% Hispanic; 7.8% Asian
- Population (2020) • Voting age: 203,881; 152,559

The 122nd district of the Texas House of Representatives contains parts of Bexar County. The current representative is Mark Dorazio, who was first elected in 2022.

== List of representatives ==
- Lyle Larson (2011 to 2023).
- Frank Corte, Jr. (2003 to 2011).
- John H. Shields (1993 to 2003).
