= 2023 San Antonio mayoral election =

- May 6, 2023
- Turnout: 15.33% ▼
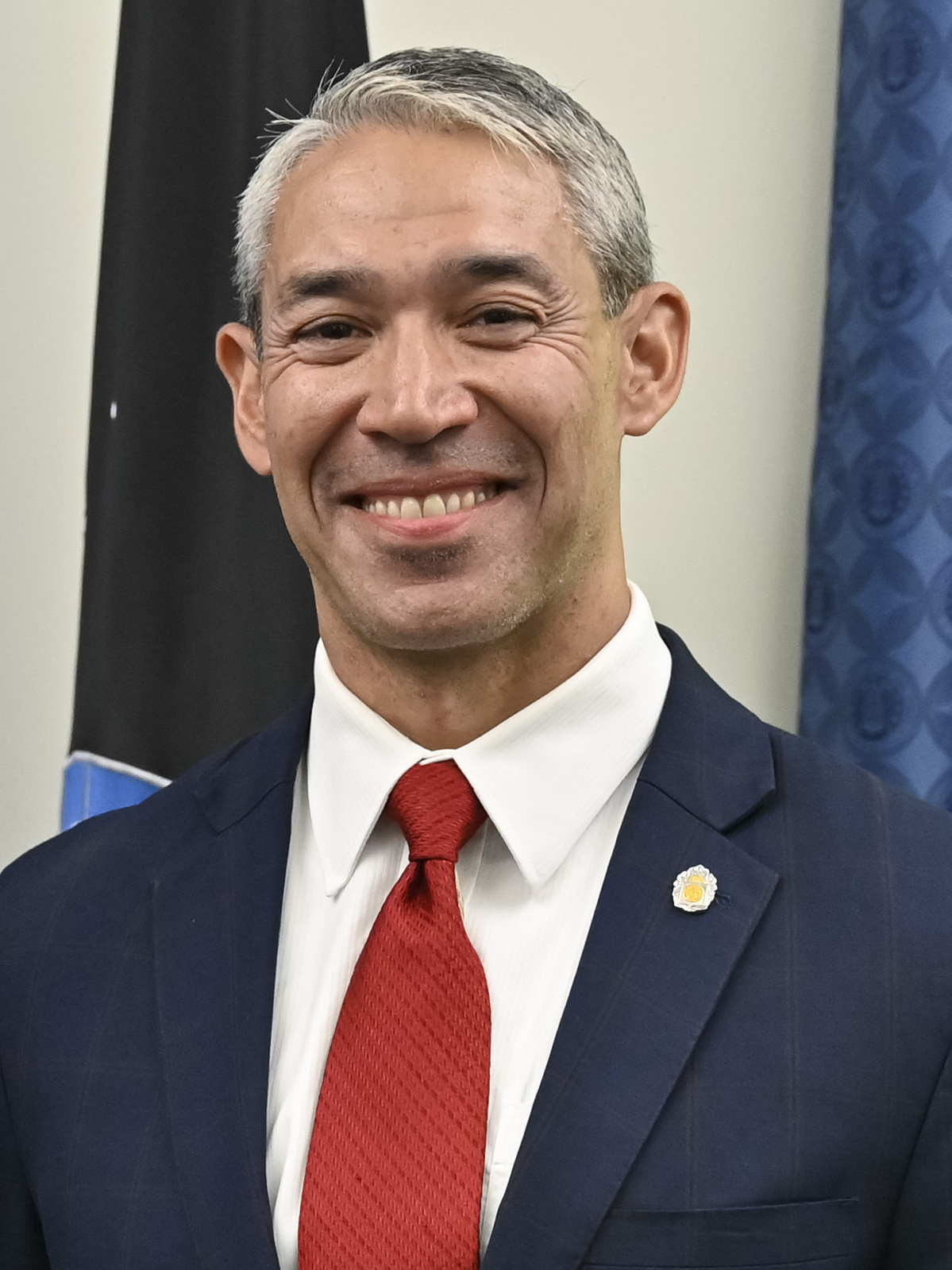

Candidate	Ron Nirenberg	Christopher Schuchardt	Gary Allen
Popular vote	83,155	29,993	8,458
Percentage	60.73%	21.90%	6.18%
Mayor before election
Ron Nirenberg
Elected mayor
Ron Nirenberg

The 2023 San Antonio mayoral election was held on May 6, 2023, to elect the mayor of San Antonio, Texas. The election is officially nonpartisan under Texas law. Incumbent mayor Ron Nirenberg ran for re-election to a fourth term in office. Due to term limits, if Nirenberg won, it would be his last term. He was facing minimal opposition and was expected to win re-election. Nirenberg easily won the election with no need for a runoff, as he received nearly 61% of the vote.

== Candidates ==
=== Declared ===
- Gary Allen, retired teacher, candidate for mayor in 2021, and candidate for Texas's 20th congressional district in 2020
- Ray Basaldua, small business owner and candidate for mayor in 2021
- Armando Dominguez
- Michael "Commander" Idrogo, perennial mayoral candidate
- Christopher Longoria, independent filmmaker
- Ron Nirenberg, incumbent mayor
- Michael Samaniego
- Christopher Schuchardt
- Diana Uriegas

== Results ==
On May 6, 2023, the election was held. Nirenberg received a significant number of early votes and never faced any serious challenge as he secured his fourth term as mayor with 60.73% of the vote.

2023 San Antonio mayoral election
Candidate		Votes	%	±
✓	Ron Nirenberg	83,155	60.73	
	Christopher Schuchardt	29,993	21.90	
	Gary Allen	8,458	6.18	
	Michael Samaniego	4,529	3.31	
	Diana Uriegas	4,055	2.96	
	Christopher Longoria	3,114	2.27	
	Ray Basaldua	2,123	1.55	
	Armando Dominguez	965	0.70	
	Michael Idrogo	535	0.39	
Turnout		161.589	15.33*	−1.93%

*Vote percentage includes all of Bexar County, with a total of 24,662 either voting in another municipal election or casting no ballot for San Antonio mayor.
