= Ivy Taylor =

American politician

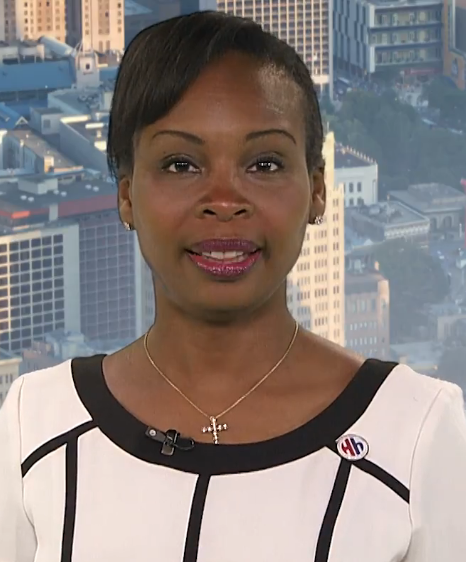
- Taylor in 2017

Mayor of San Antonio
- In office July 22, 2014 – June 21, 2017
- Preceded by: Julian Castro
- Succeeded by: Ron Nirenberg

Member of the San Antonio City Council from District 2
- In office 2009–2014

Personal details
- Born: June 17, 1970 (age 56) Brooklyn, New York City, U.S.
- Party: Democratic
- Spouse: Rodney Taylor
- Education: Yale University (AB); University of North Carolina at Chapel Hill (MS); University of Pennsylvania (Ed.D.)
- Profession: Urban planner
- Website: Official website

Ivy Ruth Taylor (born June 17, 1970) is the former Mayor of San Antonio, Texas from 2014 through 2017, and the former president of Rust College in Holly Springs, Mississippi from 2017 through 2023. The former politician and urban planner was a nonpartisan officeholder, although she is registered as a Democrat. She was also the first African American to be elected mayor of San Antonio and only the second woman in that position. In addition, Taylor was the first female African-American mayor of a city with a population of more than one million.

== Early life and education ==
Taylor was born in the Brooklyn borough of New York. She told Texas Monthly, "I was born in Brooklyn, but I grew up in Queens". She attended Public School 95 (Eastwood) in the Jamaica neighborhood. Taylor's parents moved to New York City from Wilmington, North Carolina. Her mother was a member of the Pentecostal Holiness Church. Her parents did not attend college and divorced when she was young.

Taylor obtained a bachelor's degree in American Studies in 1992 from Yale University in New Haven, Connecticut, a master's degree in City and Regional Planning in 1998 from the University of North Carolina at Chapel Hill, and a doctorate in education from the University of Pennsylvania in Philadelphia in 2020. Taylor was initiated into Delta Sigma Theta during her time at Yale. In 1997, as a graduate student, Taylor participated in a ten-week internship with the San Antonio Affordable Housing Association, a coalition of affordable-housing groups.

== Career ==
In 1999, after graduation, Taylor returned to San Antonio and began working as the municipal community development coordinator in the Housing and Community Development Department. After six years of employment with the City of San Antonio, Taylor in August 2004, went to work for Merced Housing Texas, an affordable housing agency. She also served on the City Planning Commission as a commission member from 2006 to 2008. She has also served on the board of directors for the Urban Renewal Agency (San Antonio Development Agency), and Haven for Hope. She served on the board of directors for the Martinez Street Women's Center. She became the president of Rust College in Holly Springs, Mississippi, on June 1, 2020. Taylor left Rust College as of May 6, 2023.

== Election history ==
=== San Antonio City Council and mayoral appointment ===
Taylor was elected to San Antonio City Council in 2009 to represent District 2 on the east side of the city, and was re-elected to the body in 2011 and 2013. Taylor was appointed as mayor by the San Antonio City Council to serve in the interim following Julian Castro's departure to serve as the United States Secretary of Housing and Urban Development during the presidency of Barack Obama. Castro was named in May 2014 to the Obama Cabinet and therefore was obligated to vacate his position as mayor. The charter of the City of San Antonio requires that in the event of a mayoral vacancy, the replacement mayor must be elected by and from the other ten members of the council with a majority of six votes. On July 22, 2014, the members of the San Antonio City Council held a special election to fill the vacant position. After Taylor and fellow councilman Ray Lopez split the vote 5–3 in favor of Taylor, Lopez withdrew from consideration, and Taylor was elected with a 9–0 vote. Once Taylor was elected, Castro immediately resigned as mayor.

=== 2015 San Antonio mayoral race ===
Taylor had initially said that she would not run for mayor when her interim term expired in 2015; however, she declared her candidacy for re-election on February 16, 2015. In the San Antonio mayoral election held on May 9, 2015, no candidate received a majority of the vote. A runoff election was held on June 13 between Taylor and her remaining rival, Leticia Van de Putte, a liberal Democratic former member of the Texas Senate and the Texas House of Representatives. Though Van de Putte narrowly led the field in the first round of balloting, Taylor went on to win, 51.7%–48.3%, and hence retain her position as mayor for a full two-year term.

=== 2017 San Antonio mayoral race ===
On November 13, 2016, Taylor officially announced her intention to run for a second full term as mayor. Elections were held May 6, 2017. She advanced to a runoff on June 10, 2017, where she was defeated by city councilman Ron Nirenberg.

== Tenure ==
In 2013, while on the city council, Taylor voted against a nondiscrimination ordinance approved by the council that would expand the city's then-current nondiscrimination policy to prohibit discrimination on the basis of sexual orientation, gender identity, and veteran status. Upon taking office as mayor in 2014, Taylor developed and created the city's Office of Diversity and Inclusion to handle complaints under the city's non-discrimination regulations and to facilitate resolution of these disputes. She also helped to kill a streetcar system for downtown San Antonio, which many fiscal conservatives had opposed.

Though she considers herself an independent politician, Taylor is a registered Democrat because she votes in party primaries. Taylor has described herself as both "fiscally conservative and socially conservative." Senator John Cornyn accompanied Taylor to the 2016 Martin Luther King, Jr. Day parade in San Antonio and has urged her to join the GOP and to consider a later run for governor of Texas.

== Awards ==
Taylor received the San Antonio Business Journal's "40 under 40" Rising Star award in 2004.

== Personal life ==
Taylor has one daughter. When her family lived in San Antonio, her husband operated a bail bonds business, and the Taylors lived in the Dignowity Hill neighborhood on the east side of the city.

Between 2009 and 2020, Taylor has been a guest lecturer at the University of Texas at San Antonio College of Public Policy.

In February 2024, it was announced that she had accepted a role as a senior advisor to the University of North Carolina system. Part of this would include her serving as a professor of practice at UNC Chapel Hill’s School of Government.

== See also ==
- List of first African-American mayors

Political offices
Preceded by Julian Castro	Mayor of San Antonio; 2014–2017	Succeeded by Ron Nirenberg
