= Frank Corte Jr. =

Republican member of the Texas House of Representatives

Frank Corte Jr. was a Republican member of the Texas House of Representatives from 1993 to 2011. He is a graduate of the Army War College.
