= San Antonio City Council =

Municipal government arm in Texas, US

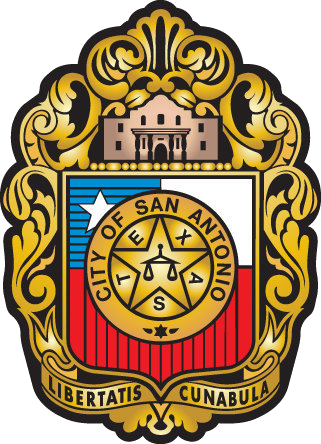

Type
- Type: Unicameral

Leadership
- Mayor: Gina Ortiz Jones since June 18, 2025

Structure
- Political groups: Nonpartisan (10)
- Length of term: 4 years
- Seats: 10

Elections
- Voting system: First-past-the-post
- Voting system: Single member districts
- Last election: May 2025
- Next election: May 2029

Meeting place
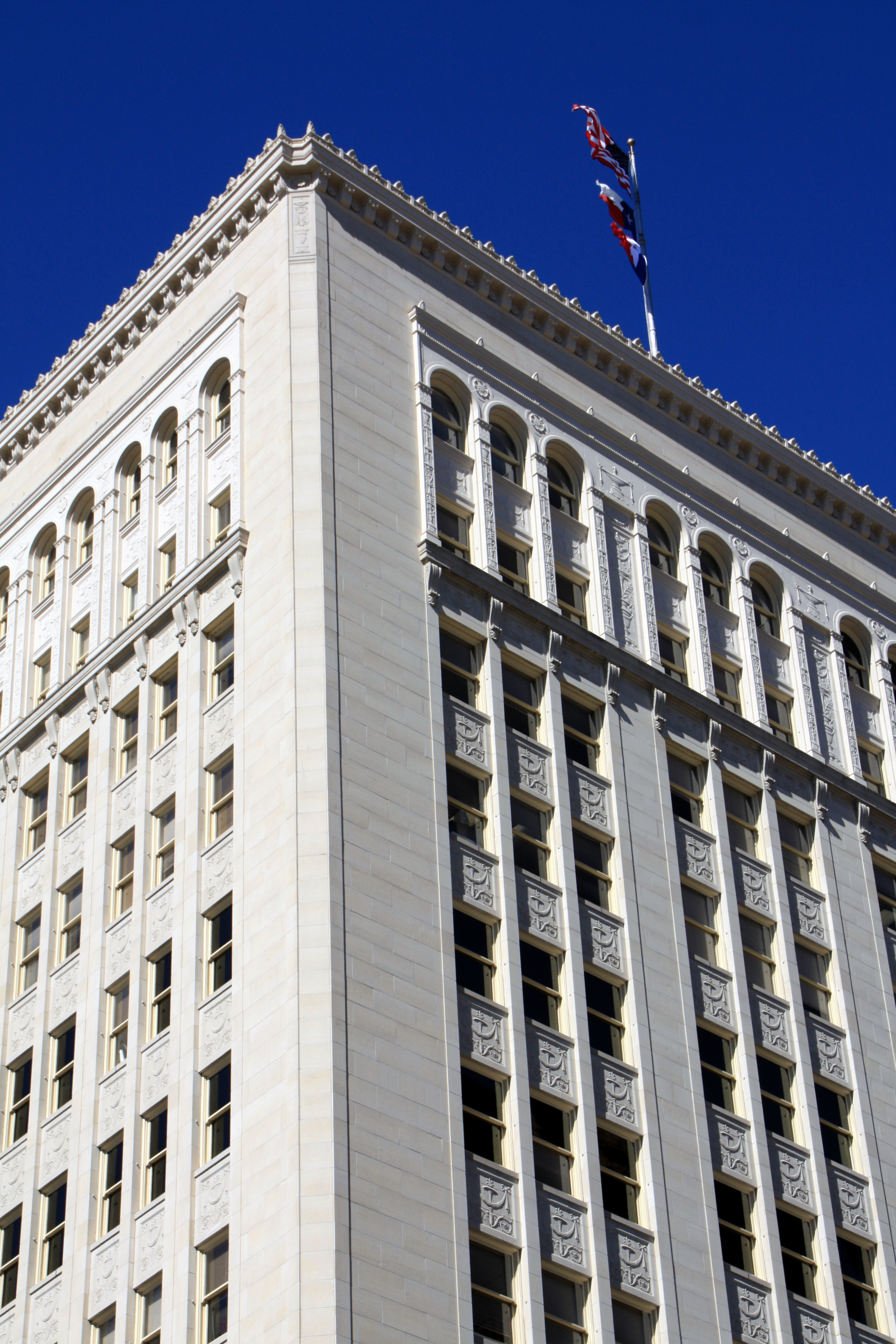
- Municipal Plaza Building

Website
- https://www.sanantonio.gov/council

The San Antonio City Council is the legislative arm of the municipal government of the city of San Antonio in the U.S. state of Texas. It consists of 10 members elected from single-member districts, which was changed from an at-large voting system in 1977.

San Antonio has a council-manager form of government in which the city manager, Erik Walsh, is the city's main, albeit unelected, executive. The mayor of San Antonio presides over the city council; Gina Ortiz Jones was elected to her first term in June 2025. As a result of the passage of Proposition F in November 2024, the term length for city council members was extended from two years to four years.

== Composition ==
San Antonio is divided into 10 districts for purposes of electoral representation in the council. Candidates are elected to office in non-partisan races. The council members are, as of June 2025, as follows:

District	Name	Elected	Term limited	Location of district
1	Sukh Kaur	2023	2031	Downtown
2	Jalen McKee-Rodriguez	2021	2029	East
3	Phyllis Viagrán	2021	2029	Southeast
4	Edward Mungia	2025	2033	Southwest
5	Teri Castillo	2021	2029	West of Downtown
6	Ric Galvan	2025	2033	West
7	Marina Alderete Gavito	2023	2031	Northwest
8	Ivalis Mesa Gonzalez	2025	2033	Northwest
9	Misty Spears	2025	2033	North Central
10	Marc Whyte	2023	2031	Northeast

== Council committees ==
There are 10 committees on which San Antonio council members may serve. Each committee is listed here with its current Chair, as of June 2023:

Committee	Chair	Members
Audit	Phyllis Viagrán (3)	John Courage (9); Marc Whyte (10); Philip Harris - Citizen Representative; Judy Trevino - Citizen Representative
Community Health	Teri Castillo (5)	Sukh Kaur (1); Phyllis Viagrán (3); Dr. Adriana Rocha Garcia (4); Marina Gavito (7)
Economic and Workforce Development	Manny Peláez (8)	Phyllis Viagrán (3); Dr. Adriana Rocha Garcia (4); Terri Castillo (5); Marc Whyte (10)
Governance	Gina Ortiz Jones (Mayor)	Dr. Adriana Rocha Garcia (4); Melissa Cabello Havrda (6); Manny Peláez (8); John Courage (9)
Municipal Court Advisory	Jalen McKee-Rodriquez (2)	Melissa Cabello Havrda (6); Manny Peláez (8); Ex-Officio members as defined by ordinance
Planning and Community Development	Dr. Adriana Rocha Garcia (4)	Phyllis Viagrán (3); Terri Castillo (5); Manny Peláez (8); John Courage (9)
Public Safety	Melissa Cabello Havrda (6)	Sukh Kaur (1)); Jalen McKee-Rodriquez (2); Marina Gavito (7); Marc Whyte (10)
Transportation and Infrastructure	John Courage (9)	Sukh Kaur (1)); Jalen McKee-Rodriquez (2); Melissa Cabello Havrda (6); Marina Gavito (7)

== Election ==
San Antonio municipal elections are held every two years in May, with runoffs scheduled in June, if necessary. Council members from all ten districts and the mayoral office are up for election during each of these municipal elections. Since 2024, council members and mayors are limited to a total of two four-year terms.

== Salary ==
Each council member receive $70,200 annually, while the mayor receives $87,800.
