= 2024 Texas House of Representatives election =

- November 5, 2024

All 150 seats in the Texas House of Representatives 76 seats needed for a majority
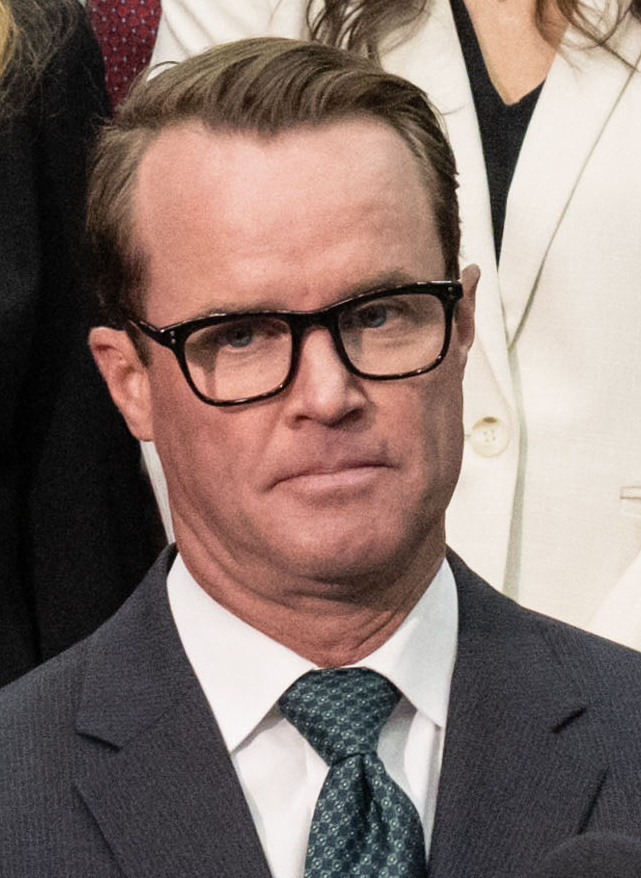

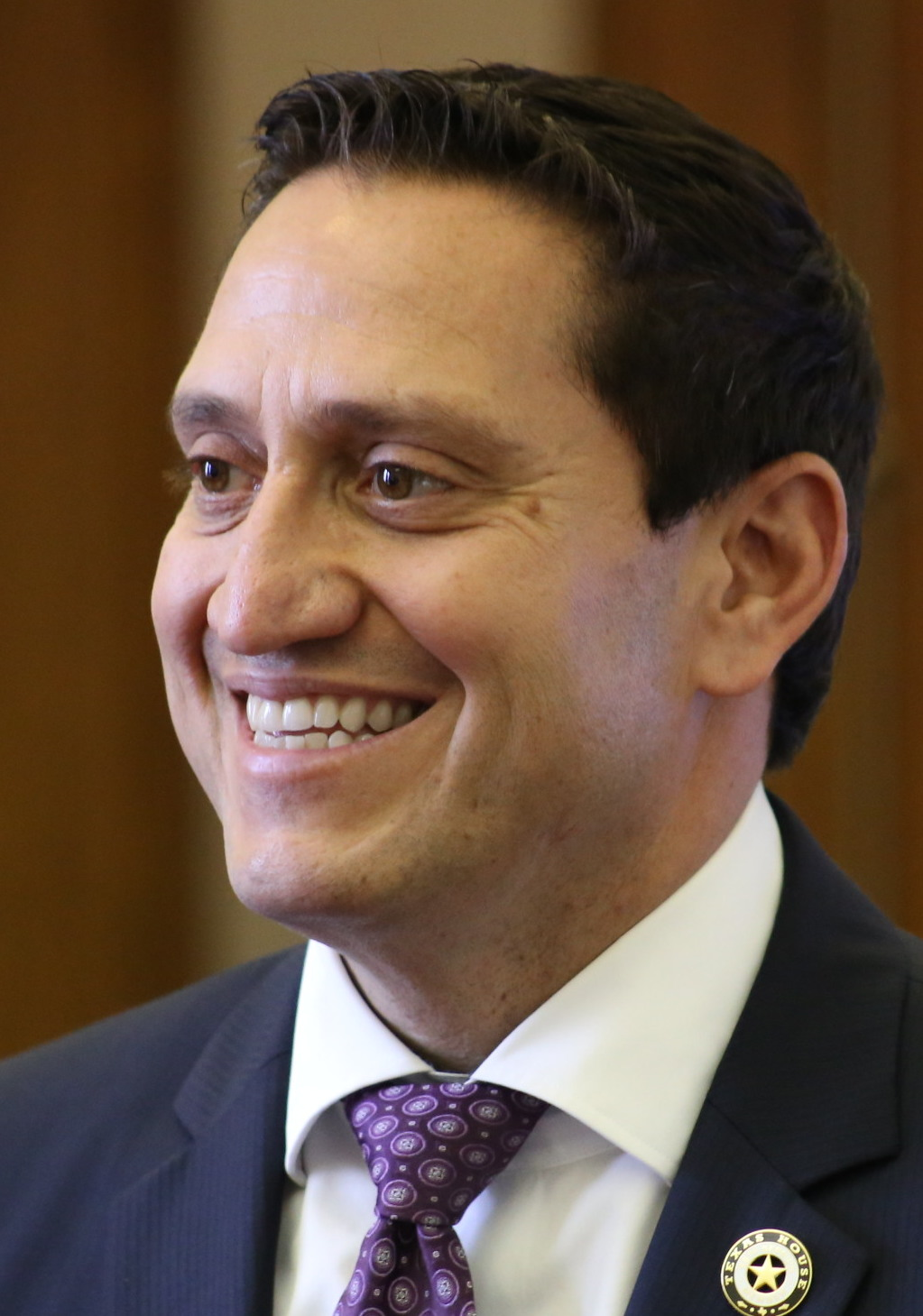
	Majority party	Minority party
Leader	Dade Phelan	Trey Martinez Fischer
Party	Republican	Democratic
Leader's seat	21st–Beaumont	116th–San Antonio
Last election	86 seats, 51.69%	64 seats, 45.68%
Seats before	87	63
Seats won	88	62
Seat change	▲1	▼1
Popular vote	5,707,863	4,362,814
Percentage	56.34%	43.07%
Swing	▲4.65%	▼2.61%
- Republican hold Republican gain Democratic hold Democratic gain Republican: 50–60% 60–70% 70–80% 80–90% >90% Democratic: 50–60% 60–70% 70–80% 80–90% >90%
Speaker before election
Dade Phelan
Republican
Speaker
Dustin Burrows
Republican

The 2024 Texas House of Representatives election was held on November 5, 2024. The winners of this election will serve in the 89th Texas Legislature. It was held alongside numerous other federal, state, and local elections, including the 2024 U.S. presidential election and the 2024 Texas Senate election.

Primary elections were held on March 5, 2024, with runoff primaries taking place, if necessary, on May 28, 2024.

== Background ==
Republicans expanded their majority by one seat to an 86–64 margin in the 2022 elections, winning multiple competitive, heavily Hispanic, districts in South Texas, while Democrats performed better than expected in suburban areas.

=== 2023 regular session ===
During the regular session, the legislature expanded school armed security measures, banned diversity, equity and inclusion offices at public universities, and allowed school districts to hire or volunteer chaplains for mental health support for students. Near the end of the session, the House voted unanimously to expel Republican Bryan Slaton for having an improper relationship with an aide. Republican infighting led to the collapse of a school voucher bill during the regular session, but governor Greg Abbott vowed to call special sessions until it passed.

Efforts to legalize online sports betting and casino gambling found a resurgence in the House late in the session. Both proposals were supported by casino company owners and sports executives, such as Las Vegas Sands and Dallas Mavericks owner Miriam Adelson, as well as former Mavericks owner Mark Cuban. Legislation to legalize either would have had to take the form of a constitutional amendment, requiring supermajority support in both legislative chambers, as well as approval from voters. The proposal to legalize online sports betting received 101 votes in the House, one above the supermajority threshold, but the bill to legalize casino gambling died without receiving a vote. Neither effort was expected to succeed in the Texas Senate due to opposition from Republican senators and lieutenant governor Dan Patrick.

=== Paxton impeachment and special sessions ===
On May 27, 2023, the House voted 121–23 to impeach attorney general Ken Paxton after a House committee found that he had used taxpayer funds to settle a legal dispute. The impeachment effort failed when the Texas Senate voted to acquit him of all charges in September 2023.

House vote on measure to remove school voucher provisions Democratic yes (63) Republican yes (21) Republican no (63) Republican voting "present" (1) Absent Democrat (1) Vacant district (1)

After the end of the regular session, Abbott called four special sessions to push for the voucher bill, but these efforts failed, bringing the effort to a final defeat in November 2023 when 21 Republicans voted with Democrats on an amendment to strip the voucher provisions from the House's education bill.

As a result of this infighting, multiple Republican incumbents found themselves having to defend against Paxton-endorsed candidates and pro-voucher candidates supported by governor Greg Abbott in the state house primaries.

=== District partisanship ===
In the 2020 presidential election in Texas, Republican Donald Trump won 85 State House districts, while Democrat Joe Biden won 65 districts. In the 2024 presidential election in Texas, Donald Trump won 11 more districts than he did in 2020 with 96, while Democrat Kamala Harris won 54 districts. In the aftermath of the 2024 election, Democrats now hold 8 districts in which Trump won with the closest being House district 40, a district that Trump won by 0.1%.

2020 Election results

Trump
40–50%
50–60%
60–70%
70–80%
80–90%
Biden
50–60%
60–70%
70–80%
80–90%

2024 Election results

Trump
40–50%
50–60%
60–70%
70–80%
80–90%
Harris
40–50%
50–60%
60–70%
70–80%

== Retirements ==
16 incumbents did not seek re-election.

=== Republicans ===
Nine Republicans did not seek re-election.

- District 6: Matt Schaefer is retiring.
- District 12: Kyle Kacal is retiring.
- District 14: John N. Raney is retiring.
- District 29: Ed Thompson is retiring.
- District 30: Geanie Morrison is retiring.
- District 53: Andrew Murr is retiring.
- District 56: Charles Anderson resigned from his seat early in August 2024.
- District 87: Four Price is retiring.
- District 97: Craig Goldman is retiring to run for U.S. Representative.

=== Democrats ===
Seven Democrats did not seek re-election.

- District 34: Abel Herrero is retiring.
- District 77: Evelina Ortega is retiring.
- District 80: Tracy King is retiring.
- District 107: Victoria Neave is retiring to run for State Senate.
- District 109: Carl O. Sherman is retiring to run for U.S. Senate.
- District 115: Julie Johnson is retiring to run for U.S. Representative.
- District 139: Jarvis Johnson is retiring to run for State Senate.

== Incumbents defeated ==
=== In primaries ===
Nine incumbent representatives, all Republicans, were defeated in the March 5 primary election. Nine incumbents (eight Republicans, one Democrat) faced runoff elections.

==== Republicans ====
- District 2: Jill Dutton lost renomination to Brent Money.
- District 11: Travis Clardy lost renomination to Joanne Shofner.
- District 18: Ernest Bailes lost renomination to Janis Holt.
- District 26: Jacey Jetton lost renomination to Matt Morgan.
- District 55: Hugh Shine lost renomination to Hillary Hickland.
- District 60: Glenn Rogers lost renomination to Mike Olcott.
- District 62: Reggie Smith lost renomination to Shelley Luther.
- District 65: Kronda Thimesch lost renomination to Mitch Little.
- District 121: Steve Allison lost renomination to Marc LaHood.

=== In runoff elections ===
Six of eight Republicans forced into runoffs, as well as the one Democrat, were defeated.

==== Republicans ====
- District 33: Justin Holland lost renomination to Katrina Pierson.
- District 44: John Kuempel lost renomination to Alan Schoolcraft.
- District 58: DeWayne Burns lost renomination to Helen Kerwin.
- District 61: Frederick Frazier lost renomination to Keresa Richardson.
- District 64: Lynn Stucky lost renomination to Andy Hopper.
- District 91: Stephanie Klick lost renomination to David Lowe.

==== Democrats ====
- District 146: Shawn Thierry lost renomination to Lauren Ashley Simmons. Thierry later joined the Republican party.

== Campaign ==
=== District 2 special election ===
2nd district special election runoff
- January 30, 2024

Texas's 2nd House of Representatives district

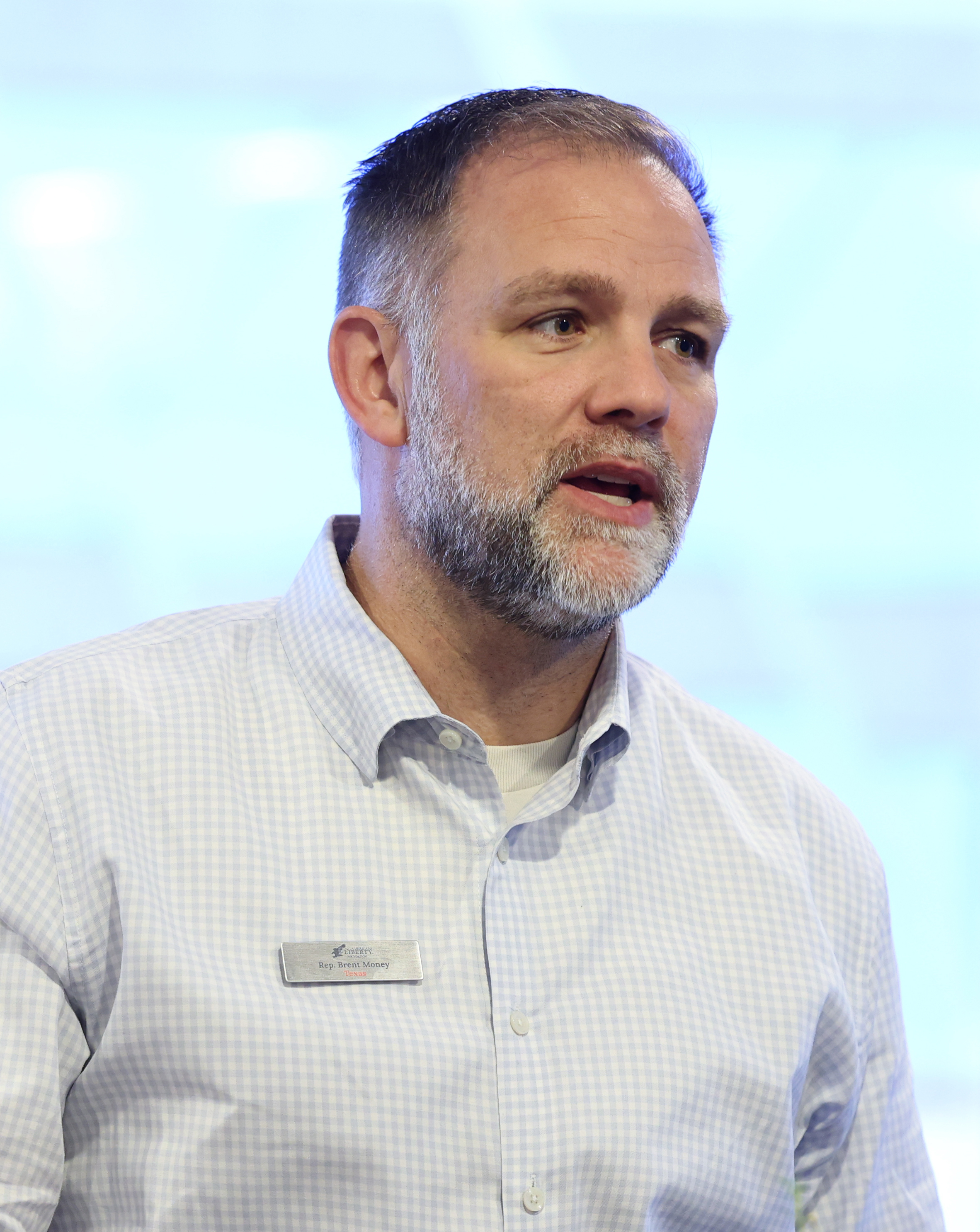
Candidate	Jill Dutton	Brent Money
Party	Republican	Republican
Popular vote	6,836	6,726
Percentage	50.4%	49.6%
- Results by county Dutton: 50–60% Money: 50–60%
Representative before election
Bryan Slaton
Republican Party
Elected Representative
Jill Dutton
Republican Party

The special election to fill the seat of expelled representative Bryan Slaton was held on November 7, 2023, but no candidate received a majority of the vote, with Jill Dutton and Brent Money, both Republicans, advancing to the runoff. Dutton received support from Speaker Dade Phelan and former governor Rick Perry, while Money received support from governor Greg Abbott, U.S. Senator Ted Cruz, and attorney general Ken Paxton. Many saw the race as a preview for the intraparty battle over vouchers and Paxton's impeachment that was soon to take place in the March primary. Dutton narrowly won the runoff on January 30, 2024.

Texas House of Representatives 2nd district special election
Party	Candidate	Votes	%
Republican	Brent Money	9,011	31.77%
Republican	Jill Dutton	7,156	25.23%
Republican	Heath Hyde	6,081	21.44%
Democratic	Kristen Washington	3,170	11.18%
Republican	Doug Roszhart	2,221	7.83%
Republican	Krista Schild	721	2.54%
Total votes		28,360	100.00%

Texas House of Representatives 2nd district special election runoff
Party	Candidate	Votes	%
Republican	Jill Dutton	6,836	50.41%
Republican	Brent Money	6,726	49.59%
Total votes		13,562	100.00%

=== Statewide primary election ===
Primary election results Democratic incumbent ran (56) Democratic incumbent retired (7) Democrat switched parties after losing renomination (1) Republican incumbent ran (62) Republican incumbent retired (9) Republican lost renomination (15)

Dozens of Republican lawmakers faced primary challenges over votes on the impeachment of Ken Paxton and on school vouchers. Paxton and Abbott combined endorsed primary challengers for over half of all Republicans running for re-election. Former president Donald Trump additionally endorsed seven challengers to House incumbents, with the three men endorsing opposing candidates in several races, including multiple in Collin County. The primary garnered national attention due to its attempts to push the House in a more conservative direction and the high number of primary challengers, especially the challenge against incumbent speaker Dade Phelan.

Conservative challengers ousted a number of incumbent Republicans in the primary, including half of those targeted by Greg Abbott. Eight others were forced into May runoff elections, including Phelan. Paxton's challengers were less successful at defeating incumbents, especially when his endorsements conflicted with Abbott's. In total, Paxton endorsed 47 candidates for state house in primary elections, 25 of which lost, 22 ended up winning, and only 4 of which were incumbents. The results marked a significant increase in support for school vouchers among Republican legislators.

On the Democratic side, multiple incumbents announced their intention to run for higher office, setting up open primaries for their House seats. A small number of Democrats were targeted for primary challenges due to their votes with Republicans on LGBT rights and other issues.

=== Runoff election ===
Six of the eight Republican incumbents forced into runoffs were defeated. Three had Abbott-endorsed challengers due to their opposition to school vouchers, while the others had been targeted due to their vote on the Paxton impeachment. Only Gary VanDeaver, an opponent of vouchers, and incumbent speaker Dade Phelan survived their runoff elections. Abbott suggested that the results of the runoff ensure enough votes to pass vouchers in the next legislative session, although this assumed that Democrats would not gain any seats in the general election. Democrats, for their part, ousted representative Shawn Thierry in a runoff, targeting her due to her votes with Republicans on LGBT rights.

=== General election ===
Commentators expected there to be few competitive seats in the general election. Each party won only one House district won by the opposing party's gubernatorial nominee during the 2022 elections. In the leadup to the general election, Republicans outraised Democrats in competitive races in South Texas, while Democrats outraised Republicans in competitive races in Dallas and San Antonio. Abbott had boasted 77 Republican candidates on the general election ballot who supported school voucher legislation in previous sessions or ousted anti-voucher incumbents, meaning Democrats would have needed a net gain of at least two seats from the 2022 election to continue to block vouchers.

== Predictions ==
Due to the size of the Republicans' majority and the low number of competitive seats, most analysts considered a change in control of the chamber to be unlikely.

=== Statewide ===
Source	Ranking	As of
CNalysis	Very Likely R	September 13, 2024
Sabato's Crystal Ball	Safe R	June 18, 2024

=== Competitive districts ===
District	Incumbent	Previous result	CNalysis (Note: CNalysis has two separate sets of predictions: Classic (Analyst ratings only), and Expanded (Classic alongside recent statewide election results). This table uses the Classic set.) Oct. 21, 2024	Result
34th	Abel Herrero (retiring)	57.65% D	Lean D	55.37% R
37th	Janie Lopez	51.83% R	Lean R	55.01% R
52nd	Caroline Harris	55.94% R	Lean R	56.24% R
61st	Frederick Frazier (lost renomination)	58.26% R	Very Likely R	59.62% R
63rd	Ben Bumgarner	55.93% R	Tilt R	55.66% R
65th	Kronda Thimesch (lost renomination)	59.79% R	Very Likely R	60.30% R
74th	Eddie Morales	55.67% D	Likely D	51.67% D
80th	Tracy King (retiring)	100.00% D	Very Likely R (flip)	59.49% R
93rd	Nate Schatzline	59.93% R	Very Likely R	60.55% R
94th	Tony Tinderholt	56.63% R	Lean R	55.62% R
97th	Craig Goldman (retiring)	58.20% R	Very Likely R	58.07% R
108th	Morgan Meyer	56.45% R	Tilt R	57.61% R
112th	Angie Chen Button	54.83% R	Tilt D (flip)	53.87% R
118th	John Lujan	51.84% R	Lean D (flip)	51.73% R
121st	Steve Allison (lost renomination)	55.02% R	Tilt D (flip)	52.53% R
122nd	Mark Dorazio	56.02% R	Likely R	58.09% R
132nd	Mike Schofield	59.74% R	Very Likely R	58.76% R
138th	Lacey Hull	57.09% R	Likely R	57.02% R

== Results ==
=== Statewide ===
Summary of the November 5, 2024 Texas House of Representatives election results
Party	Candidates	Votes	%	Seats	+/–	%
Republican	112	5,707,863	56.34%	88	▲1	58.67%
Democratic	127	4,362,814	43.07%	62	▼1	41.33%
Libertarian	7	52,575	0.52%	0	–	0%
Independent	1	4,478	0.04%	0	–	0%
Write-in	5	2,509	0.02%	0	–	0%
Total	252	10,130,239	100.00%	150	–	

Popular vote
Republican	56.34%
Democratic	43.07%
Libertarian	0.52%
Independent	0.06%

House seats won
Republican	58.67%
Democratic	41.33%

=== Close races ===
Seats where the margin of victory was under 10%:

1. District 74, 3.36%
2. District 118, 3.46%
3. District 70, 4.44%
4. District 121, 5.06%
5. District 41, 6.94%
6. District 112, 7.74%
7. District 115, 8.62%
8. District 105, 9.38%
9. District 148, 9.88%

=== Results by district ===
District	Democratic		Republican		Others		Total		Result
District	Votes	%	Votes	%	Votes	%	Votes	%	Result
District 1	-	-	66,843	100.00%	-	-	66,843	100.00%	Republican hold
District 2	17,182	19.44%	71,222	80.56%	-	-	88,404	100.00%	Republican hold
District 3	-	-	85,793	100.00%	-	-	85,793	100.00%	Republican hold
District 4	26,240	30.33%	60,287	69.67%	-	-	86,527	100.00%	Republican hold
District 5	-	-	74,381	98.79%	910	1.21%	74,381	100.00%	Republican hold
District 6	22,158	28.17%	56,497	71.83%	-	-	78,655	100.00%	Republican hold
District 7	20,520	25.79%	59,056	74.21%	-	-	79,576	100.00%	Republican hold
District 8	13,961	18.64%	60,938	81.36%	-	-	74,899	100.00%	Republican hold
District 9	-	-	74,006	100.00%	-	-	74,006	100.00%	Republican hold
District 10	-	-	68,706	98.67%	928	1.33%	68,706	100.00%	Republican hold
District 11	-	-	62,338	100.00%	-	-	62,338	100.00%	Republican hold
District 12	19,325	23.16%	64,105	76.84%	-	-	83,430	100.00%	Republican hold
District 13	17,301	23.82%	55,317	76.18%	-	-	72,618	100.00%	Republican hold
District 14	26,332	39.54%	40,262	60.46%	-	-	66,594	100.00%	Republican hold
District 15	-	-	73,720	100.00%	-	-	73,720	100.00%	Republican hold
District 16	17,930	19.64%	73,385	80.36%	-	-	91,315	100.00%	Republican hold
District 17	27,389	33.85%	53,531	66.15%	-	-	80,920	100.00%	Republican hold
District 18	-	-	69,326	86.58%	10,749	13.42%	80,075	100.00%	Republican hold
District 19	31,486	25.52%	87,416	70.85%	4,478	3.63%	123,380	100.00%	Republican hold
District 20	43,148	40.24%	64,086	59.76%	-	-	107,234	100.00%	Republican hold
District 21	-	-	66,398	100.00%	-	-	66,398	100.00%	Republican hold
District 22	34,336	100.00%	-	-	-	-	34,336	100.00%	Democratic hold
District 23	26,680	33.13%	53,841	66.87%	-	-	80,521	100.00%	Republican hold
District 24	-	-	78,761	100.00%	-	-	78,761	100.00%	Republican hold
District 25	29,999	38.96%	47,002	61.04%	-	-	77,001	100.00%	Republican hold
District 26	33,505	40.83%	48,561	59.17%	-	-	82,066	100.00%	Republican hold
District 27	57,594	69.81%	24,908	30.19%	-	-	82,502	100.00%	Democratic hold
District 28	37,058	39.45%	56,890	60.55%	-	-	93,948	100.00%	Republican hold
District 29	31,060	38.48%	49,655	61.52%	-	-	80,715	100.00%	Republican hold
District 30	17,120	23.04%	57,180	76.96%	-	-	74,300	100.00%	Republican hold
District 31	-	-	50,653	100.00%	-	-	50,653	100.00%	Republican hold
District 32	24,656	31.31%	54,091	68.69%	-	-	78,747	100.00%	Republican hold
District 33	-	-	70,996	100.00%	-	-	70,996	100.00%	Republican hold
District 34	23,013	44.63%	28,553	55.37%	-	-	51,566	100.00%	Republican gain
District 35	25,896	100.00%	-	-	-	-	25,896	100.00%	Democratic hold
District 36	32,483	100.00%	-	-	-	-	32,483	100.00%	Democratic hold
District 37	25,014	44.99%	30,590	55.01%	-	-	55,604	100.00%	Republican hold
District 38	33,944	100.00%	-	-	-	-	33,944	100.00%	Democratic hold
District 39	26,962	60.90%	17,308	39.10%	-	-	44,270	100.00%	Democratic hold
District 40	34,671	100.00%	-	-	-	-	34,671	100.00%	Democratic hold
District 41	30,589	53.47%	26,618	46.53%	-	-	57,207	100.00%	Democratic hold
District 42	38,584	100.00%	-	-	-	-	38,584	100.00%	Democratic hold
District 43	21,842	33.27%	43,812	66.73%	-	-	65,654	100.00%	Republican hold
District 44	30,780	34.88%	57,466	65.12%	-	-	88,246	100.00%	Republican hold
District 45	52,912	56.76%	40,312	43.24%	-	-	93,224	100.00%	Democratic hold
District 46	60,832	73.24%	22,223	26.76%	-	-	83,055	100.00%	Democratic hold
District 47	59,016	60.17%	39,066	39.83%	-	-	98,082	100.00%	Democratic hold
District 48	72,631	83.00%	-	-	14,871	17.00%	87,502	100.00%	Democratic hold
District 49	80,498	100.00%	-	-	-	-	80,498	100.00%	Democratic hold
District 50	48,289	100.00%	-	-	-	-	48,289	100.00%	Democratic hold
District 51	52,801	100.00%	-	-	-	-	52,801	100.00%	Democratic hold
District 52	48,884	43.76%	62,830	56.24%	-	-	111,714	100.00%	Republican hold
District 53	21,058	21.17%	76,176	76.59%	2,230	2.24%	99,464	100.00%	Republican hold
District 54	21,993	38.91%	34,526	61.09%	-	-	56,519	100.00%	Republican hold
District 55	29,269	42.59%	39,455	57.41%	-	-	68,724	100.00%	Republican hold
District 56	25,733	31.41%	56,195	68.59%	-	-	81,928	100.00%	Republican hold
District 57	34,279	38.51%	51,865	58.27%	2,870	3.22%	89,014	100.00%	Republican hold
District 58	-	-	63,760	82.06%	13,935	17.94%	77,695	100.00%	Republican hold
District 59	15,367	19.33%	64,147	80.67%	-	-	79,514	100.00%	Republican hold
District 60	-	-	93,326	100.00%	-	-	93,326	100.00%	Republican hold
District 61	39,632	40.38%	58,513	59.62%	-	-	98,145	100.00%	Republican hold
District 62	19,240	22.29%	67,062	77.71%	-	-	86,302	100.00%	Republican hold
District 63	37,326	44.34%	46,861	55.66%	-	-	84,187	100.00%	Republican hold
District 64	34,786	36.88%	59,542	63.12%	-	-	94,328	100.00%	Republican hold
District 65	39,686	39.70%	60,284	60.30%	-	-	99,970	100.00%	Republican hold
District 66	37,098	38.89%	58,294	61.11%	-	-	95,392	100.00%	Republican hold
District 67	37,051	39.77%	56,107	60.23%	-	-	93,158	100.00%	Republican hold
District 68	11,705	12.83%	79,554	87.17%	-	-	91,259	100.00%	Republican hold
District 69	14,518	21.32%	53,583	78.68%	-	-	68,101	100.00%	Republican hold
District 70	38,183	52.22%	34,933	47.78%	-	-	73,116	100.00%	Democratic hold
District 71	13,678	18.97%	58,413	81.03%	-	-	72,091	100.00%	Republican hold
District 72	-	-	57,821	100.00%	-	-	57,821	100.00%	Republican hold
District 73	36,686	28.52%	91,924	71.48%	-	-	128,610	100.00%	Republican hold
District 74	28,203	51.67%	26,378	48.33%	-	-	54,581	100.00%	Democratic hold
District 75	35,033	100.00%	-	-	-	-	35,033	100.00%	Democratic hold
District 76	39,770	56.50%	30,615	43.50%	-	-	70,385	100.00%	Democratic hold
District 77	35,427	100.00%	-	-	-	-	35,427	100.00%	Democratic hold
District 78	45,474	100.00%	-	-	-	-	45,474	100.00%	Democratic hold
District 79	41,652	100.00%	-	-	-	-	41,652	100.00%	Democratic hold
District 80	21,231	40.51%	31,182	59.49%	-	-	52,413	100.00%	Republican gain
District 81	-	-	41,508	100.00%	-	-	41,508	100.00%	Republican hold
District 82	10,555	17.27%	50,546	82.73%	-	-	61,101	100.00%	Republican hold
District 83	-	-	69,899	100.00%	-	-	69,899	100.00%	Republican hold
District 84	20,733	35.90%	37,021	64.10%	-	-	57,754	100.00%	Republican hold
District 85	-	-	75,040	100.00%	-	-	75,040	100.00%	Republican hold
District 86	-	-	68,942	100.00%	-	-	68,942	100.00%	Republican hold
District 87	11,048	20.68%	42,317	79.22%	55	0.10%	53,365	100.00%	Republican hold
District 88	-	-	54,093	100.00%	-	-	54,093	100.00%	Republican hold
District 89	36,292	39.37%	55,900	60.63%	-	-	92,192	100.00%	Republican hold
District 90	35,674	100.00%	-	-	-	-	35,674	100.00%	Democratic hold
District 91	-	-	53,970	100.00%	-	-	53,970	100.00%	Republican hold
District 92	35,274	100.00%	-	-	-	-	35,274	100.00%	Democratic hold
District 93	34,871	39.45%	53,532	60.55%	-	-	88,403	100.00%	Republican hold
District 94	34,937	44.38%	43,785	55.62%	-	-	78,722	100.00%	Republican hold
District 95	43,827	100.00%	-	-	-	-	43,827	100.00%	Democratic hold
District 96	36,276	42.63%	48,814	57.37%	-	-	85,090	100.00%	Republican hold
District 97	37,132	41.93%	51,432	58.07%	-	-	88,564	100.00%	Republican hold
District 98	33,845	34.30%	64,833	65.70%	-	-	98,678	100.00%	Republican hold
District 99	28,233	37.18%	47,708	62.82%	-	-	75,941	100.00%	Republican hold
District 100	34,119	100.00%	-	-	-	-	34,119	100.00%	Democratic hold
District 101	40,337	64.94%	21,781	35.06%	-	-	62,118	100.00%	Democratic hold
District 102	35,788	100.00%	-	-	-	-	35,788	100.00%	Democratic hold
District 103	40,330	100.00%	-	-	-	-	40,330	100.00%	Democratic hold
District 104	33,295	100.00%	-	-	-	-	33,295	100.00%	Democratic hold
District 105	22,850	54.69%	18,928	45.31%	-	-	41,778	100.00%	Democratic hold
District 106	39,941	39.42%	61,381	60.58%	-	-	101,322	100.00%	Republican hold
District 107	29,546	100.00%	-	-	-	-	29,546	100.00%	Democratic hold
District 108	44,307	42.39%	60,227	57.61%	-	-	104,534	100.00%	Republican hold
District 109	56,138	100.00%	-	-	-	-	56,138	100.00%	Democratic hold
District 110	30,618	100.00%	-	-	-	-	30,618	100.00%	Democratic hold
District 111	53,039	100.00%	-	-	-	-	53,039	100.00%	Democratic hold
District 112	40,645	46.13%	47,456	53.87%	-	-	88,101	100.00%	Republican hold
District 113	33,547	56.59%	25,732	43.41%	-	-	59,279	100.00%	Democratic hold
District 114	43,554	62.76%	25,839	37.24%	-	-	69,393	100.00%	Democratic hold
District 115	37,692	54.31%	31,709	45.69%	-	-	69,401	100.00%	Democratic hold
District 116	38,044	66.00%	19,596	34.00%	-	-	57,640	100.00%	Democratic hold
District 117	40,066	57.99%	29,021	42.01%	-	-	69,087	100.00%	Democratic hold
District 118	36,624	48.27%	39,246	51.73%	-	-	75,870	100.00%	Republican hold
District 119	38,160	63.68%	21,763	36.32%	-	-	59,923	100.00%	Democratic hold
District 120	38,208	100.00%	-	-	-	-	38,208	100.00%	Democratic hold
District 121	46,104	47.47%	51,013	52.53%	-	-	97,117	100.00%	Republican hold
District 122	46,180	41.91%	64,018	58.09%	-	-	110,198	100.00%	Republican hold
District 123	44,043	100.00%	-	-	-	-	44,043	100.00%	Democratic hold
District 124	30,345	61.52%	18,981	38.48%	-	-	49,326	100.00%	Democratic hold
District 125	48,251	100.00%	-	-	-	-	48,251	100.00%	Democratic hold
District 126	-	-	59,749	98.98%	616	1.02%	59,749	100.00%	Republican hold
District 127	35,932	39.49%	55,048	60.51%	-	-	90,980	100.00%	Republican hold
District 128	19,181	28.85%	45,372	68.24%	1,932	2.91%	66,485	100.00%	Republican hold
District 129	33,758	39.17%	52,419	60.83%	-	-	86,177	100.00%	Republican hold
District 130	28,671	31.18%	63,270	68.82%	-	-	91,941	100.00%	Republican hold
District 131	36,948	100.00%	-	-	-	-	36,948	100.00%	Democratic hold
District 132	37,846	41.24%	53,928	58.76%	-	-	91,774	100.00%	Republican hold
District 133	-	-	54,283	100.00%	-	-	54,283	100.00%	Republican hold
District 134	61,037	61.33%	38,480	38.67%	-	-	99,517	100.00%	Democratic hold
District 135	43,114	100.00%	-	-	-	-	43,114	100.00%	Democratic hold
District 136	45,185	62.02%	27,665	37.98%	-	-	72,850	100.00%	Democratic hold
District 137	19,286	76.31%	-	-	5,988	23.69%	25,274	100.00%	Democratic hold
District 138	31,671	42.98%	42,022	57.02%	-	-	73,693	100.00%	Republican hold
District 139	46,196	100.00%	-	-	-	-	46,196	100.00%	Democratic hold
District 140	22,272	100.00%	-	-	-	-	22,272	100.00%	Democratic hold
District 141	32,492	100.00%	-	-	-	-	32,492	100.00%	Democratic hold
District 142	41,430	100.00%	-	-	-	-	41,430	100.00%	Democratic hold
District 143	27,796	100.00%	-	-	-	-	27,796	100.00%	Democratic hold
District 144	26,617	100.00%	-	-	-	-	26,617	100.00%	Democratic hold
District 145	46,104	100.00%	-	-	-	-	46,104	100.00%	Democratic hold
District 146	42,840	77.72%	12,282	22.28%	-	-	55,122	100.00%	Democratic gain
District 147	47,828	74.54%	16,332	25.46%	-	-	64,160	100.00%	Democratic hold
District 148	28,341	54.94%	23,246	45.06%	-	-	51,587	100.00%	Democratic hold
District 149	26,921	57.02%	20,291	42.98%	-	-	47,212	100.00%	Democratic hold
District 150	32,181	40.14%	48,000	59.86%	-	-	80,181	100.00%	Republican hold
Total	4,362,814	43.07%	5,707,863	56.34%	59,662	20.59%	10,130,239	100.00%	

=== Elected representatives ===
† - Incumbent not seeking re-election
٭ - Incumbent lost re-nomination

District	Incumbent	Party	Elected Representative	Party
1st	Gary VanDeaver	Rep	Gary VanDeaver	Rep
2nd	Jill Dutton٭	Rep	Brent Money	Rep
3rd	Cecil Bell Jr.	Rep	Cecil Bell Jr.	Rep
4th	Keith Bell	Rep	Keith Bell	Rep
5th	Cole Hefner	Rep	Cole Hefner	Rep
6th	Matt Schaefer†	Rep	Daniel Alders	Rep
7th	Jay Dean	Rep	Jay Dean	Rep
8th	Cody Harris	Rep	Cody Harris	Rep
9th	Trent Ashby	Rep	Trent Ashby	Rep
10th	Brian Harrison	Rep	Brian Harrison	Rep
11th	Travis Clardy٭	Rep	Joanne Shofner	Rep
12th	Kyle Kacal†	Rep	Trey Wharton	Rep
13th	Angelia Orr	Rep	Angelia Orr	Rep
14th	John N. Raney†	Rep	Paul Dyson	Rep
15th	Steve Toth	Rep	Steve Toth	Rep
16th	Will Metcalf	Rep	Will Metcalf	Rep
17th	Stan Gerdes	Rep	Stan Gerdes	Rep
18th	Ernest Bailes٭	Rep	Janis Holt	Rep
19th	Ellen Troxclair	Rep	Ellen Troxclair	Rep
20th	Terry Wilson	Rep	Terry Wilson	Rep
21st	Dade Phelan	Rep	Dade Phelan	Rep
22nd	Christian Manuel	Dem	Christian Manuel	Dem
23rd	Terri Leo-Wilson	Rep	Terri Leo-Wilson	Rep
24th	Greg Bonnen	Rep	Greg Bonnen	Rep
25th	Cody Vasut	Rep	Cody Vasut	Rep
26th	Jacey Jetton٭	Rep	Matt Morgan	Rep
27th	Ron Reynolds	Dem	Ron Reynolds	Dem
28th	Gary Gates	Rep	Gary Gates	Rep
29th	Ed Thompson†	Rep	Jeffrey Barry	Rep
30th	Geanie Morrison†	Rep	AJ Louderback	Rep
31st	Ryan Guillen	Rep	Ryan Guillen	Rep
32nd	Todd Ames Hunter	Rep	Todd Ames Hunter	Rep
33rd	Justin Holland٭	Rep	Katrina Pierson	Rep
34th	Abel Herrero†	Dem	Denise Villalobos	Rep
35th	Oscar Longoria	Dem	Oscar Longoria	Dem
36th	Sergio Muñoz	Dem	Sergio Muñoz	Dem
37th	Janie Lopez	Rep	Janie Lopez	Rep
38th	Erin Gamez	Dem	Erin Gamez	Dem
39th	Armando Martinez	Dem	Armando Martinez	Dem
40th	Terry Canales	Dem	Terry Canales	Dem
41st	Robert Guerra	Dem	Robert Guerra	Dem
42nd	Richard Raymond	Dem	Richard Raymond	Dem
43rd	José Manuel Lozano	Rep	José Manuel Lozano	Rep
44th	John Kuempel٭	Rep	Alan Schoolcraft	Rep
45th	Erin Zwiener	Dem	Erin Zwiener	Dem
46th	Sheryl Cole	Dem	Sheryl Cole	Dem
47th	Vikki Goodwin	Dem	Vikki Goodwin	Dem
48th	Donna Howard	Dem	Donna Howard	Dem
49th	Gina Hinojosa	Dem	Gina Hinojosa	Dem
50th	James Talarico	Dem	James Talarico	Dem
51st	Lulu Flores	Dem	Lulu Flores	Dem
52nd	Caroline Harris Davila	Rep	Caroline Harris Davila	Rep
53rd	Andrew Murr†	Rep	Wes Virdell	Rep
54th	Brad Buckley	Rep	Brad Buckley	Rep
55th	Hugh Shine٭	Rep	Hillary Hickland	Rep
56th	Charles Anderson†	Rep	Pat Curry	Rep
57th	Richard Hayes	Rep	Richard Hayes	Rep
58th	DeWayne Burns٭	Rep	Helen Kerwin	Rep
59th	Shelby Slawson	Rep	Shelby Slawson	Rep
60th	Glenn Rogers٭	Rep	Mike Olcott	Rep
61st	Frederick Frazier٭	Rep	Keresa Richardson	Rep
62nd	Reggie Smith٭	Rep	Shelley Luther	Rep
63rd	Ben Bumgarner	Rep	Ben Bumgarner	Rep
64th	Lynn Stucky٭	Rep	Andy Hopper	Rep
65th	Kronda Thimesch٭	Rep	Mitch Little	Rep
66th	Matt Shaheen	Rep	Matt Shaheen	Rep
67th	Jeff Leach	Rep	Jeff Leach	Rep
68th	David Spiller	Rep	David Spiller	Rep
69th	James Frank	Rep	James Frank	Rep
70th	Mihaela Plesa	Dem	Mihaela Plesa	Dem
71st	Stan Lambert	Rep	Stan Lambert	Rep
72nd	Drew Darby	Rep	Drew Darby	Rep
73rd	Carrie Isaac	Rep	Carrie Isaac	Rep
74th	Eddie Morales	Dem	Eddie Morales	Dem
75th	Mary González	Dem	Mary González	Dem
76th	Suleman Lalani	Dem	Suleman Lalani	Dem
77th	Evelina Ortega†	Dem	Vincent Perez	Dem
78th	Joe Moody	Dem	Joe Moody	Dem
79th	Claudia Ordaz	Dem	Claudia Ordaz	Dem
80th	Tracy King†	Dem	Don McLaughlin	Rep
81st	Brooks Landgraf	Rep	Brooks Landgraf	Rep
82nd	Tom Craddick	Rep	Tom Craddick	Rep
83rd	Dustin Burrows	Rep	Dustin Burrows	Rep
84th	Carl Tepper	Rep	Carl Tepper	Rep
85th	Stan Kitzman	Rep	Stan Kitzman	Rep
86th	John T. Smithee	Rep	John T. Smithee	Rep
87th	Four Price†	Rep	Caroline Fairly	Rep
88th	Ken King	Rep	Ken King	Rep
89th	Candy Noble	Rep	Candy Noble	Rep
90th	Ramon Romero Jr.	Dem	Ramon Romero Jr.	Dem
91st	Stephanie Klick٭	Rep	David Lowe	Rep
92nd	Salman Bhojani	Dem	Salman Bhojani	Dem
93rd	Nate Schatzline	Rep	Nate Schatzline	Rep
94th	Tony Tinderholt	Rep	Tony Tinderholt	Rep
95th	Nicole Collier	Dem	Nicole Collier	Dem
96th	David Cook	Rep	David Cook	Rep
97th	Craig Goldman†	Rep	John McQueeney	Rep
98th	Giovanni Capriglione	Rep	Giovanni Capriglione	Rep
99th	Charlie Geren	Rep	Charlie Geren	Rep
100th	Venton Jones	Dem	Venton Jones	Dem
101st	Chris Turner	Dem	Chris Turner	Dem
102nd	Ana-Maria Ramos	Dem	Ana-Maria Ramos	Dem
103rd	Rafael Anchia	Dem	Rafael Anchia	Dem
104th	Jessica González	Dem	Jessica González	Dem
105th	Terry Meza	Dem	Terry Meza	Dem
106th	Jared Patterson	Rep	Jared Patterson	Rep
107th	Victoria Neave†	Dem	Linda Garcia	Dem
108th	Morgan Meyer	Rep	Morgan Meyer	Rep
109th	Carl Sherman†	Dem	Aicha Davis	Dem
110th	Toni Rose	Dem	Toni Rose	Dem
111th	Yvonne Davis	Dem	Yvonne Davis	Dem
112th	Angie Chen Button	Rep	Angie Chen Button	Rep
113th	Rhetta Bowers	Dem	Rhetta Bowers	Dem
114th	John Bryant	Dem	John Bryant	Dem
115th	Julie Johnson†	Dem	Cassandra Hernandez	Dem
116th	Trey Martinez Fischer	Dem	Trey Martinez Fischer	Dem
117th	Philip Cortez	Dem	Philip Cortez	Dem
118th	John Lujan	Rep	John Lujan	Rep
119th	Elizabeth Campos	Dem	Elizabeth Campos	Dem
120th	Barbara Gervin-Hawkins	Dem	Barbara Gervin-Hawkins	Dem
121st	Steve Allison٭	Rep	Marc LaHood	Rep
122nd	Mark Dorazio	Rep	Mark Dorazio	Rep
123rd	Diego Bernal	Dem	Diego Bernal	Dem
124th	Josey Garcia	Dem	Josey Garcia	Dem
125th	Ray Lopez	Dem	Ray Lopez	Dem
126th	Sam Harless	Rep	Sam Harless	Rep
127th	Charles Cunningham	Rep	Charles Cunningham	Rep
128th	Briscoe Cain	Rep	Briscoe Cain	Rep
129th	Dennis Paul	Rep	Dennis Paul	Rep
130th	Tom Oliverson	Rep	Tom Oliverson	Rep
131st	Alma Allen	Dem	Alma Allen	Dem
132nd	Mike Schofield	Rep	Mike Schofield	Rep
133rd	Mano DeAyala	Rep	Mano DeAyala	Rep
134th	Ann Johnson	Dem	Ann Johnson	Dem
135th	Jon Rosenthal	Dem	Jon Rosenthal	Dem
136th	John Bucy III	Dem	John Bucy III	Dem
137th	Gene Wu	Dem	Gene Wu	Dem
138th	Lacey Hull	Rep	Lacey Hull	Rep
139th	Jarvis Johnson†	Dem	Charlene Ward Johnson	Dem
140th	Armando Walle	Dem	Armando Walle	Dem
141st	Senfronia Thompson	Dem	Senfronia Thompson	Dem
142nd	Harold Dutton Jr.	Dem	Harold Dutton Jr.	Dem
143rd	Ana Hernandez	Dem	Ana Hernandez	Dem
144th	Mary Ann Perez	Dem	Mary Ann Perez	Dem
145th	Christina Morales	Dem	Christina Morales	Dem
146th	Shawn Thierry٭	Rep (Note: Originally elected as a Democrat, changed parties after losing re-nomination.)	Lauren Ashley Simmons	Dem
147th	Jolanda Jones	Dem	Jolanda Jones	Dem
148th	Penny Morales Shaw	Dem	Penny Morales Shaw	Dem
149th	Hubert Vo	Dem	Hubert Vo	Dem
150th	Valoree Swanson	Rep	Valoree Swanson	Rep

== Speaker election ==
House vote for Speaker For Burrows (85) Democrat for Burrows (49) Republican for Burrows (36) For Cook (55) Republican for Cook (52) Democrat for Cook (3) Not voting (10) Democrat not voting (9) Absent Democrat (1)

Despite narrowly defeating his primary election challenger, incumbent speaker Dade Phelan faced significant hurdles in retaining his position. Phelan gained his first challenger, Tom Oliverson, in March after nine incumbent Republicans lost renomination, and he gained a second, Shelby Slawson, in May after six more Republicans lost primary runoff elections. A primary issue for both candidates was their opposition to Phelan's continuation of the longstanding tradition of appointing members of the minority party as committee chairs. Nearly 50 House Republicans had pledged to vote against any speaker candidate who would continue this tradition, all but dooming Phelan's chances at winning the Republican nomination.

By September, five Republicans had announced bids for the speakership against Phelan. On September 20, 48 house Republicans who opposed Phelan unanimously chose David Cook of the 96th district as the reformer-endorsed candidate in the next speakership election. Phelan was expected to seek support from Democrats in order to remain as speaker, but ultimately opted out of seeking a third term as speaker. Dustin Burrows of the 83rd district, an ally of Phelan, sought the speakership relying on the support of Democratic representatives and Republicans who defeated primary challengers. On January 14, 2025, Burrows was elected Texas House Speaker after 49 Democrats joined 36 Republicans to back him in the second round of voting, defeating Cook by a vote of 85 to 55.

== Detailed results ==
Results according to the Texas Secretary of State. Precinct results compiled by the Texas Legislative Council.

=== District 1 ===
Republican runoff results by precinct: VanDeaver—100% VanDeaver—70–80% VanDeaver—60–70% VanDeaver—50–60% Tie—50% Spencer—50–60% Spencer—60–70% Spencer—70–80% No vote

Incumbent Republican Gary VanDeaver won re-election. Chris Spencer forced VanDeaver into a runoff, with the latter's votes against school vouchers and for the impeachment of Ken Paxton emerging as primary points of contention between the two candidates. VanDeaver himself won election to the House in a 2014 Republican primary against then-incumbent George Lavender, who was considered much more conservative than VanDeaver. VanDeaver defeated Spencer in the runoff.

District 1 Republican primary
Party	Candidate	Votes	%
Republican	Gary VanDeaver (incumbent)	13,928	45.53%
Republican	Chris Spencer	13,165	43.04%
Republican	Dale Huls	3,496	11.43%
Total votes		30,589	100.00%

District 1 Republican primary runoff
Party	Candidate	Votes	%
Republican	Gary VanDeaver (incumbent)	11,718	53.52%
Republican	Chris Spencer	10,178	46.48%
Total votes		21,896	100.00%

District 1 general election
Party	Candidate	Votes	%
Republican	Gary VanDeaver (incumbent)	66,843	100.00%
Total votes		66,843	100.00%
Republican hold			

=== District 2 ===
Republican primary results by precinct: Money—70–80% Money—60–70% Money—50–60% Dutton—50–60% Dutton—70–80%

Incumbent Republican Jill Dutton ran for re-election. She was elected in a January 2024 special election and faced a rematch with Brent Money. Money, the more conservative of the two candidates, sought victory in the primary after blaming his defeat in the special election on Democrats allegedly voting for Dutton. Texas has an open primary system for its elections. Money defeated Dutton.

District 2 Republican primary
Party	Candidate	Votes	%
Republican	Brent Money	17,300	56.89%
Republican	Jill Dutton (incumbent)	13,110	43.11%
Total votes		30,410	100.00%

District 2 general election
Party	Candidate	Votes	%
Republican	Brent Money	71,222	80.56%
Democratic	Kristen Washington	17,182	19.44%
Total votes		88,404	100%
Republican hold			

=== District 3 ===
Incumbent Republican Cecil Bell Jr. won re-election unopposed.

District 3 general election
Party	Candidate	Votes	%
Republican	Cecil Bell Jr. (incumbent)	85,793	85,793
Total votes		85,793	100%
Republican hold			

=== District 4 ===
Incumbent Republican Keith Bell won re-election. He defeated evangelical Christian pastor Joshua Feuerstein in the primary election. Despite Bell's vote against school voucher legislation, Feuerstein received no endorsement or campaign support from Greg Abbott.

District 4 Republican primary
Party	Candidate	Votes	%
Republican	Keith Bell (incumbent)	15,863	75.12%
Republican	Joshua Feuerstein	5,255	24.88%
Total votes		21,118	100.00%

District 4 general election
Party	Candidate	Votes	%
Republican	Keith Bell (incumbent)	60,287	69.67%
Democratic	Alex Bar-Sela	26,240	30.33%
Total votes		86,527	100%
Republican hold			

=== District 5 ===
Incumbent Republican Cole Hefner won re-election. He faced Independent Nancy Nichols, a former Democratic Committee member, who ran as a write-in candidate.

District 5 Republican primary
Party	Candidate	Votes	%
Republican	Cole Hefner (incumbent)	20,040	69.81%
Republican	Jeff Fletcher	5,547	19.32%
Republican	Dewey Collier	3,119	10.87%
Total votes		28,706	100.00%

District 5 general election
Party	Candidate	Votes	%
Republican	Cole Hefner (incumbent)	74,381	98.79
Write-in	Nancy A. Nichols	910	1.21%
Total votes		75,291	100%
Republican hold			

=== District 6 ===
Incumbent Republican Matt Schaefer retired. Daniel Alders ran unopposed in the Republican primary to replace him, and he easily won the general election.

District 6 general election
Party	Candidate	Votes	%
Republican	Daniel Alders	56,497	71.83%
Democratic	Cody Grace	22,158	28.17%
Total votes		78,655	100%
Republican hold			

=== District 7 ===
Incumbent Republican Jay Dean won re-election. He was targeted for a primary challenge due to his opposition to school voucher legislation. Despite this, neither of Dean's primary opponents received an endorsement from Greg Abbott.

District 7 Republican primary
Party	Candidate	Votes	%
Republican	Jay Dean (incumbent)	15,629	71.97%
Republican	Joe McDaniel	4,973	22.90%
Republican	Bonnie Walters	1,115	5.13%
Total votes		21,717	100.00%

District 7 general election
Party	Candidate	Votes	%
Republican	Jay Dean (incumbent)	59,056	74.21%
Democratic	Marlena Cooper	20,520	25.79%
Total votes		79,576	100%
Republican hold			

=== District 8 ===
Incumbent Republican Cody Harris won re-election. He was targeted for a primary challenge due to his support of the impeachment of attorney general Ken Paxton.

District 8 Republican primary
Party	Candidate	Votes	%
Republican	Cody Harris (incumbent)	21,179	82.84%
Republican	Jaye Curtis	4,386	17.16%
Total votes		25,565	100.00%

District 8 general election
Party	Candidate	Votes	%
Republican	Cody Harris (incumbent)	60,938	81.36%
Democratic	Carolyn Salter	13,961	18.64%
Total votes		74,899	100%
Republican hold			

=== District 9 ===
Incumbent Republican Trent Ashby won re-election. His challenger, Paulette Carson, was endorsed by attorney general Ken Paxton.

District 9 Republican primary
Party	Candidate	Votes	%
Republican	Trent Ashby (incumbent)	24,331	82.16%
Republican	Paulette Carson	5,284	17.84%
Total votes		29,615	100.00%

District 9 general election
Party	Candidate	Votes	%
Republican	Trent Ashby (incumbent)	74,006	100%
Total votes		74,006	100%
Republican hold			

=== District 10 ===
Incumbent Republican Brian Harrison won re-election with only write-in opposition.

District 10 general election
Party	Candidate	Votes	%
Republican	Brian Harrison (incumbent)	68,706	98.67%
Write-in	Jennifer Brummell	888	1.28%
Write-in	Jeremy Schroppel	40	0.06%
Total votes		69,634	100%
Republican hold			

=== District 11 ===
Republican primary results by precinct: Shofner—100% Shofner—80–90% Shofner—70–80% Shofner—60–70% Shofner—50–60% Tie—50% Clardy—50–60% Clardy—60–70%

Incumbent Republican Travis Clardy ran for re-election but lost renomination to Joanne Shofner. He was endorsed by attorney general Ken Paxton, but was targeted for a primary challenge due to his opposition to school voucher legislation.

District 11 Republican primary
Party	Candidate	Votes	%
Republican	Joanne Shofner	19,712	62.95%
Republican	Travis Clardy (incumbent)	11,601	37.05%
Total votes		31,313	100.00%

District 11 general election
Party	Candidate	Votes	%
Republican	Joanne Shofner	62,338	100%
Total votes		62,338	100%
Republican hold			

=== District 12 ===
Incumbent Republican Kyle Kacal retired. Kacal had opposed school voucher legislation during the previous legislative session. Trey Wharton and Ben Bius, both supporters of vouchers, advanced to a runoff election, but Greg Abbott endorsed Wharton in the race. Bius had previously been the Republican nominee for this seat in 2000. Wharton defeated Bius in the runoff.

District 12 Republican primary
Party	Candidate	Votes	%
Republican	Trey Wharton	10,506	34.99%
Republican	Ben Bius	9,804	32.66%
Republican	John Harvey Slocum	9,712	32.35%
Total votes		30,022	100.00%

District 12 Republican primary runoff results
Party	Candidate	Votes	%
Republican	Trey Wharton	10,139	72.37%
Republican	Ben Bius	3,871	27.63%
Total votes		14,010	100.00%

District 12 general election
Party	Candidate	Votes	%
Republican	Trey Wharton	64,105	76.84%
Democratic	Dee Howard Mullins	19,325	23.16%
Total votes		83,430	100%
Republican hold			

=== District 13 ===
Incumbent Republican Angelia Orr won re-election.

District 13 general election
Party	Candidate	Votes	%
Republican	Angelia Orr (incumbent)	55,317	76.18%
Democratic	Albert Hunter	17,301	23.82%
Total votes		72,618	100%
Republican hold			

=== District 14 ===
Incumbent Republican John N. Raney retired. Raney announced his retirement after having voted against school voucher legislation in the previous legislature. Greg Abbott endorsed Paul Dyson, a supporter of school vouchers, in the Republican primary.

District 14 Republican primary
Party	Candidate	Votes	%
Republican	Paul Dyson	9,754	63.68%
Republican	Rick Davis	5,564	36.32%
Total votes		15,318	100.00%

District 14 Republican primary
Party	Candidate	Votes	%
Republican	Paul Dyson	40,262	60.46%
Democratic	Fred Medina	26,332	39.54%
Total votes		66,594	100%
Republican hold			

=== District 15 ===
Incumbent Republican Steve Toth won re-election. Conroe ISD board member Stephen Hubert challenged Toth in the Republican primary, running on a platform of strong support for public education.

District 15 Republican primary
Party	Candidate	Votes	%
Republican	Steve Toth (incumbent)	15,972	65.58%
Republican	Stephen “Skeeter” Hubert	8,384	34.42%
Total votes		24,356	100.00%

District 15 general election
Party	Candidate	Votes	%
Republican	Steve Toth (incumbent)	73,720	100%
Total votes		73,720	100%
Republican hold			

=== District 16 ===
Incumbent Republican Will Metcalf won re-election.

District 16 general election
Party	Candidate	Votes	%
Republican	Will Metcalf (incumbent)	73,385	80.36%
Democratic	Mike Midler	17,930	19.64%
Total votes		91,315	100%
Republican hold			

=== District 17 ===
Republican primary results by precinct: Gerdes—80–90% Gerdes—70–80% Gerdes—60–70% Gerdes—50–60% Glass—50–60%

Incumbent Republican Stan Gerdes won re-election. He was targeted for a primary challenge due to his support of the impeachment of attorney general Ken Paxton.

District 17 Republican primary
Party	Candidate	Votes	%
Republican	Stan Gerdes (incumbent)	14,159	57.85%
Republican	Tom Glass	10,315	42.15%
Total votes		24,474	100.00%

District 17 general election
Party	Candidate	Votes	%
Republican	Stan Gerdes (incumbent)	53,531	66.15%
Democratic	Desiree Venable	27,389	33.85%
Total votes		80,920	100%
Republican hold			

=== District 18 ===
Republican primary results by precinct: Holt—70–80% Holt—60–70% Holt—50–60% Holt—40–50% Bailes—40–50% Bailes—50–60% Bailes—60–70%

Incumbent Republican Ernest Bailes ran for re-election but lost renomination to Janis Holt. He had been targeted for a primary challenge due to his opposition to school voucher legislation. Bailes campaigned heavily on his support for public schools. Holt, on the other hand, made little to no mention of vouchers during her campaign, focusing instead on immigration issues, especially as they related to Bailes' support of 2017 legislation that enabled the establishment of a municipal management district in Colony Ridge. The district led to the construction of housing primarily occupied by low-income and immigrant families, which Holt claimed was overly burdening the area's hospitals and schools. District 18 was the only district in the state to oust an anti-voucher incumbent without having any accredited private schools within its boundaries.

District 18 Republican primary
Party	Candidate	Votes	%
Republican	Janis Holt	15,014	53.20%
Republican	Ernest Bailes (incumbent)	10,952	38.80%
Republican	Stephen Andrew Missick	2,258	8.00%
Total votes		28,224	100.00%

District 18 general election
Party	Candidate	Votes	%
Republican	Janis Holt	69,326	86.58%
Libertarian	Seth Steele	10.749	13.42%
Total votes		80,075	100%
Republican hold			

=== District 19 ===
Republican primary results by precinct: Troxclair—70–80% Troxclair—60–70% Troxclair—50–60% Troxclair—40–50% Tie—40–50% Biedermann—40–50% Biedermann—50–60% Biedermann—60–70% No vote

Incumbent Republican Ellen Troxclair won re-election. She was targeted for a primary challenge by former state representative Kyle Biedermann due to her support of the impeachment of attorney general Ken Paxton.

District 19 Republican primary
Party	Candidate	Votes	%
Republican	Ellen Troxclair (incumbent)	20,826	52.12%
Republican	Kyle Biedermann	17,189	43.02%
Republican	Manny Campos	1,942	4.86%
Total votes		39,957	100.00%

District 19 Democratic primary
Party	Candidate	Votes	%
Democratic	Dwain Handley	3,599	57.16%
Democratic	Zach Vance	2,697	42.84%
Total votes		6,296	100.00%

District 19 general election
Party	Candidate	Votes	%
Republican	Ellen Troxclair (incumbent)	87,416	70.85%
Democratic	Dwain Handley	31,486	25.52%
Independent	Kodi Sawin	4,478	3.63%
Total votes		123,380	100%
Republican hold			

=== District 20 ===
Republican primary results by precinct: Wilson—70–80% Wilson—60–70% Wilson—50–60% Chapa—50–60% Chapa—60–70%

Incumbent Republican Terry Wilson won re-election. He was targeted for the impeachment of attorney general Paxton.

District 20 Republican primary
Party	Candidate	Votes	%
Republican	Terry Wilson (incumbent)	13,945	59.40%
Republican	Elva Janine Chapa	9,532	40.60%
Total votes		23,477	100.00%

District 20 general election
Party	Candidate	Votes	%
Republican	Terry Wilson (incumbent)	64,086	59.76%
Democratic	Stephan Wyman	43,148	40.24%
Total votes		107,234	100%
Republican hold			

=== District 21 ===
Republican primary results by precinct. Phelan—70–80% Phelan—60–70% Phelan—50–60% Phelan—40–50% Phelan—30–40% Covey—30–40% Covey—40–50% Covey—50–60% Covey—60–70% Davis—40–50%

Incumbent Republican Speaker of the Texas House Dade Phelan ran for re-election. Phelan was targeted by conservatives over his support of the impeachment of attorney general Ken Paxton, the House's failure to pass school voucher legislation in the 2023 session, and his continuation of the practice of appointing Democrats as chairs of House committees. Despite heralding the passage of conservative legislation on abortion, guns, and border security, Phelan was targeted as "insufficiently conservative" by many in the state party, which voted to censure him in February 2024. The race was seen as the primary hotspot in the party's internal battle in the primary over the Paxton impeachment and school vouchers. Much of the campaign was focused on Paxton's impeachment, but it also included the alleged harassment of Phelan's wife and terroristic threats against Phelan himself. This was Phelan's first primary challenge since he initially won the Beaumont-area district in 2014.

David Covey, the former Republican chairman of Orange county, forced Phelan into a runoff in what many had seen as a battle between "old guard" Texas Republicans and the far-right. Supporters of Covey argued that Phelan had given too much power to house Democrats through his continuation of the practice of appointing Democrats as chairs of certain house committees. Prominent Republicans such as former governor Rick Perry and former U.S. Senator Kay Bailey Hutchison headlined fundraising for Phelan, including businesswoman Miriam Adelson, while conservative businessmen Jeff Yass, Farris Wilks, and Tim Dunn had given financial backing to Covey, in what became the most expensive house race in state history. Controversy arose during the campaign after a deepfaked mailer depicting Phelan with prominent Democratic politicians such as Nancy Pelosi was circulated. The ad accused Phelan of being a Democratic "puppet," but it did not violate the state's recently passed anti-deepfake law, causing some to consider revising it during the next session.

Republican runoff results by precinct. Phelan—100% Phelan—80–90% Phelan—70–80% Phelan—60–70% Phelan—50–60% Covey—50–60% Covey—60–70% Covey—70–80% Covey—80–90% Covey—100%

Phelan narrowly won the runoff against Covey, ensuring his re-election. His future as Speaker was uncertain, however, as many within his caucus called for his replacement, and many other backers of his speakership lost their primaries.

==== Endorsements ====
David Covey

U.S. Executive Branch Officials

- Donald Trump, 45th president of the United States (2017–2021)

Statewide officials

- Sid Miller, Agriculture Commissioner of Texas (2015–present)
- Dan Patrick, Lieutenant Governor of Texas (2015–present)
- Ken Paxton, Texas Attorney General (2015–present)
Dade Phelan

U.S. Executive Branch Officials

- Rick Perry, United States Secretary of Energy (2017–2019) and 47th Governor of Texas (2000–2015)

Texas state representatives

- Todd Ames Hunter, 32nd district (2009–present)
- Tom Oliverson, 130th district (2017–present)
- Jared Patterson, 106th district (2019–present)

Local officials

- Roy West, mayor of Beaumont (2023–present)
- David Rutledge, mayor of Bridge City (2016–present)
- Randy Branch, mayor of West Orange (2023–present)
- Larry Spears, mayor of Orange (2018–present)
- Anderson Land, mayor of Jasper (2023–present)

Organizations

- National Rifle Association Political Victory Fund

Labor unions

- Texas AFL-CIO

==== Fundraising ====
Campaign finance reports as of May 18, 2024
Candidate	Raised	Spent	Cash on hand
Dade Phelan (R)	$9,345,738	$12,655,784	$1,558,403
David Covey (R)	$2,553,403	$2,119,075	$226,605
Source: Texas Ethics Commission

==== Results ====
District 21 Republican primary
Party	Candidate	Votes	%
Republican	David Covey	15,589	46.28%
Republican	Dade Phelan (incumbent)	14,574	43.26%
Republican	Alicia Davis	3,523	10.46%
Total votes		33,686	100.00%
Turnout			26.93%

District 21 Republican primary runoff results
Party	Candidate	Votes	%
Republican	Dade Phelan (incumbent)	12,846	50.78%
Republican	David Covey	12,457	49.22%
Total votes		25,303	100.00%
Turnout			20.14%

District 21 general election
Party	Candidate	Votes	%
Republican	Dade Phelan (incumbent)	66,398	100%
Total votes		66,398	100%
Republican hold			

=== District 22 ===
Incumbent Democrat Christian Manuel won re-election. He defeated lawyer Al Price Jr., the son of former state representative Al Price Sr, in the Democratic primary

District 22 Democratic primary
Party	Candidate	Votes	%
Democratic	Christian Manuel (incumbent)	7,167	73.52%
Democratic	Al Price Jr.	2,188	22.45%
Democratic	Luther Wayne Martin III	393	4.03%
Total votes		9,748	100.00%

District 22 general election
Party	Candidate	Votes	%
Democratic	Christian Manuel (incumbent)	34,336	100%
Total votes		34,336	100%
Democratic hold			

=== District 23 ===
Incumbent Republican Terri Leo-Wilson won re-election.

District 23 general election
Party	Candidate	Votes	%
Republican	Terri Leo-Wilson (incumbent)	53,841	66.87%
Democratic	Dev Merugumala	26,680	33.13%
Total votes		80,521	100%
Republican hold			

=== District 24 ===
Incumbent Republican Greg Bonnen won re-election.

District 24 Republican primary
Party	Candidate	Votes	%
Republican	Greg Bonnen (incumbent)	16,983	83.48%
Republican	Larissa Ramirez	3,361	16.52%
Total votes		20,344	100.00%

District 24 general election
Party	Candidate	Votes	%
Republican	Greg Bonnen (incumbent)	78,761	100%
Total votes		78,761	100%
Republican hold			

=== District 25 ===
Incumbent Republican Cody Vasut won re-election.

District 25 general election
Party	Candidate	Votes	%
Republican	Cody Vasut (incumbent)	47,002	61.04%
Democratic	J. Daggett	29,999	38.96%
Total votes		77,001	100%
Republican hold			

=== District 26 ===
Republican primary results by precinct: Morgan—60–70% Morgan—50–60% Morgan—40–50% Tie—40–50% Jetton—40–50% No vote

Incumbent Republican Jacey Jetton ran for re-election but lost renomination to Matt Morgan. He had been targeted for a primary challenge due to his support of the impeachment of attorney general Ken Paxton.

District 26 Republican primary
Party	Candidate	Votes	%
Republican	Matt Morgan	8,786	53.78%
Republican	Jacey Jetton (incumbent)	6,316	38.66%
Republican	Jessica Rose Huang	1,235	7.56%
Total votes		16,337	100.00%

District 26 general election
Party	Candidate	Votes	%
Republican	Matt Morgan	48,561	59.17%
Democratic	Daniel Lee	33,505	40.83%
Total votes		82,066	100%
Republican hold			

=== District 27 ===
Incumbent Democrat Ron Reynolds won re-election. He defeated perennial candidate Rodrigo Carreon in the Democratic primary.

District 27 Democratic primary
Party	Candidate	Votes	%
Democratic	Ron Reynolds (incumbent)	12,150	85.56%
Democratic	Rodrigo Carreon	2,050	14.44%
Total votes		14,200	100.00%

District 27 general election
Party	Candidate	Votes	%
Democratic	Ron Reynolds (incumbent)	57,594	69.81%
Republican	Ibifrisolam Max-Alalibo	24,908	30.19%
Total votes		82,502	100%
Democratic hold			

=== District 28 ===
Incumbent Republican Gary Gates won re-election. Gates voted for the impeachment of attorney general Ken Paxton, but he later expressed regret for the vote, publicly defending Paxton and earning his endorsement in his primary election.

District 28 Republican primary
Party	Candidate	Votes	%
Republican	Gary Gates (incumbent)	10,612	61.07%
Republican	Dan Mathews	6,764	38.93%
Total votes		17,376	100.00%

District 28 Democratic primary
Party	Candidate	Votes	%
Democratic	Marty Rocha	3,548	57.00%
Democratic	Nelvin Adriatico	2,677	43.00%
Total votes		6,225	100.00%

District 28 general election
Party	Candidate	Votes	%
Republican	Gary Gates (incumbent)	56,890	60.55%
Democratic	Marty Rocha	37,058	39.45%
Total votes		93,948	100%
Republican hold			

=== District 29 ===
Republican runoff results by precinct. Barry—60–70% Barry—50–60% Kamkar—50–60% Kamkar—60–70%

Incumbent Republican Ed Thompson retired. Former Pearland city councilors Jeffrey Barry and Alex Kamkar advanced to the Republican primary runoff to replace him. Thompson, an opponent of school voucher legislation, endorsed Barry while Greg Abbott, the primary proponent of vouchers, endorsed Kamkar. Barry also received support from a multitude of local elected officials and anti-voucher political action committees. During the early voting period of the runoff election, Barry accused a supporter of Kamkar of luring a swarm of bees to a campaign tent outside a polling location, although the validity of this accusation was disputed. Barry defeated Kamkar in the runoff election.

District 29 Republican primary
Party	Candidate	Votes	%
Republican	Jeffrey Barry	7,775	48.39%
Republican	Alex Kamkar	7,077	44.05%
Republican	Edgar Pacheco Jr.	756	4.71%
Republican	Trent Perez	458	2.85%
Total votes		16,066	100.00%

District 29 Republican primary runoff
Party	Candidate	Votes	%
Republican	Jeffrey Barry	5,339	58.48%
Republican	Alex Kamkar	3,790	41.52%
Total votes		9,129	100.00%

District 29 general election
Party	Candidate	Votes	%
Republican	Jeffrey Barry	49,655	61.52%
Democratic	Adrienne Bell	31,060	38.48%
Total votes		80,715	100%
Republican hold			

=== District 30 ===
Republican runoff results by precinct.: Louderback: 100% 80–90% 70–80% 60–70% 50–60% / Bauknight: 70–80% 60–70% 50–60%

Incumbent Republican Geanie Morrison retired. Former Jackson County sheriff AJ Louderback won the Republican primary runoff to succeed Morrison, despite coming in second place in the March primary. His opponent, Victoria mayor Jeff Bauknight, had been endorsed by Morrison and governor Greg Abbott, while Louderback had been endorsed by attorney general Ken Paxton and lieutenant governor Dan Patrick.

District 30 Republican primary
Party	Candidate	Votes	%
Republican	Jeff Bauknight	11,384	42.07%
Republican	AJ Louderback	10,946	40.45%
Republican	Vanessa Hicks-Callaway	2,733	10.10%
Republican	Bret Baldwin	1,998	7.38%
Total votes		27,061	100.00%

District 30 Republican primary runoff
Party	Candidate	Votes	%
Republican	AJ Louderback	9,105	55.04%
Republican	Jeff Bauknight	7,437	44.96%
Total votes		16,542	100.00%

District 30 general election
Party	Candidate	Votes	%
Republican	AJ Louderback	57,180	76.96%
Democratic	Stephanie Bassham	17,120	23.04%
Total votes		74,300	100%
Republican hold			

=== District 31 ===
Incumbent Republican Ryan Guillien won re-election unopposed.

District 31 general election
Party	Candidate	Votes	%
Republican	Ryan Guillen (incumbent)	50,653	100%
Total votes		50,653	100%
Republican hold			

=== District 32 ===
Incumbent Republican Todd Hunter won re-election.

District 32 general election
Party	Candidate	Votes	%
Republican	Todd Hunter (incumbent)	54,091	68.69
Democratic	Cathy McAuliffe	24,656	31.31
Total votes		78,747	100%
Republican hold			

=== District 33 ===
Republican runoff results by precinct: Pierson—80–90% Pierson—70–80% Pierson—60–70% Pierson—50–60% Holland—50–60% No vote

Incumbent Republican Justin Holland ran for re-election. He was targeted in the Republican primary for his votes to impeach attorney general Ken Paxton and against school voucher legislation, as well as his support of gun control legislation following a mall shooting in Allen, Texas, near his Rockwall district.

Katrina Pierson, the spokesperson for Donald Trump's 2016 presidential campaign, forced Holland into a runoff. Pierson had endorsed one of Abbott's primary challengers in 2022, and he did not endorse her before the March primary. While Abbott and other Texas Republicans endorsed her after she made the runoff, Donald Trump and Ted Cruz had not, despite her work on both men's previous campaigns. School vouchers and gun control emerged as the primary dividing issues between the candidates. Pierson defeated Holland in the runoff.

District 33 Republican primary
Party	Candidate	Votes	%
Republican	Katrina Pierson	9,832	39.48%
Republican	Justin Holland (incumbent)	9,630	38.67%
Republican	Dennis London	5,444	21.86%
Total votes		24,906	100.00%

District 33 Republican primary runoff
Party	Candidate	Votes	%
Republican	Katrina Pierson	10,215	56.34%
Republican	Justin Holland (incumbent)	7,917	43.66%
Total votes		18,132	100.00%

District 33 general election
Party	Candidate	Votes	%
Republican	Katrina Pierson	70,996	100%
Total votes		70,996	100%
Republican hold			

=== District 34 ===
District 34 election
- November 5, 2024
Nominee	Denise Villalobos	Solomon Ortiz Jr.
Party	Republican	Democratic
Popular vote	28,553	23,013
Percentage	55.37%	44.63%
- Precinct results Villalobos: 50–60% 60–70% 70–80% 80–90% Ortiz: 50–60% 60–70% 70–80%
State representative before election
Abel Herrero
Democratic
Elected State representative
Denise Villalobos
Republican

Incumbent Democrat Abel Herrero retired. Former state representative Solomon Ortiz Jr. defeated Corpus Christi city council member Roland Barrera in the Democratic Primary. He faced Republican Denise Villalobos in the general, in what was a top pickup target for Texas Republicans. Villalobos won by a wide margin, flipping the seat.

District 34 Democratic primary
Party	Candidate	Votes	%
Democratic	Solomon Ortiz Jr.	4,877	72.97%
Democratic	Roland Barrera	1,807	27.03%
Total votes		6,684	100.00%

District 34 general election
Party	Candidate	Votes	%
Republican	Denise Villalobos	28,553	55.37%
Democratic	Solomon Ortiz Jr.	23,013	44.63%
Total votes		51,566	100%
Republican gain from Democratic			

=== District 35 ===
Incumbent Democrat Oscar Longoria won re-election unopposed.

District 35 general election
Party	Candidate	Votes	%
Democratic	Oscar Longoria (incumbent)	25,896	100%
Total votes		25,896	100%
Democratic hold			

=== District 36 ===
Incumbent Democrat Sergio Muñoz won re-election unopposed.

District 36 general election
Party	Candidate	Votes	%
Democratic	Sergio Muñoz (incumbent)	32,483	100%
Total votes		32,483	100%
Democratic hold			

=== District 37 ===
District 37 election
- November 5, 2024
Nominee	Janie Lopez	Jonathan Gracia
Party	Republican	Democratic
Popular vote	30,590	24,014
Percentage	55.01%	44.99%
- Precinct results Lopez: 50–60% 60–70% 70–80% 80–90% Gracia: 50–60% 60–70% Tie: 50%
State representative before election
Janie Lopez
Republican
Elected State representative
Janie Lopez
Republican

Incumbent Republican Janie Lopez won re-election. Lopez narrowly won the South Texas district in 2022. Among Lopez's Democratic challengers is former representative Alex Dominguez, who represented the seat prior to the 2022 election before retiring to run for the Texas Senate. Lopez was considered a top Democratic target for this election, and Democrats attacked Lopez for her support of school voucher legislation.

District 37 Democratic primary
Party	Candidate	Votes	%
Democratic	Ruben Cortez Jr.	2,695	32.48%
Democratic	Jonathan Gracia	2,110	25.43%
Democratic	Alex Dominguez	1,976	23.82%
Democratic	Carol Lynn Sanchez	1,516	18.27%
Total votes		8,297	100.00%

District 37 Democratic primary runoff
Party	Candidate	Votes	%
Democratic	Jonathan Gracia	2,792	61.34%
Democratic	Ruben Cortez Jr.	1,760	38.66%
Total votes		4,552	100.00%

District 37 general election
Party	Candidate	Votes	%
Republican	Janie Lopez (incumbent)	30,590	55.01%
Democratic	Jonathan Gracia	25,014	44.99%
Total votes		55,604	100%
Republican hold			

=== District 38 ===
Incumbent Democrat Erin Gamez won re-election unopposed.

District 38 general election
Party	Candidate	Votes	%
Democratic	Erin Gamez (incumbent)	33,944	100%
Total votes		33,944	100%
Democratic hold			

=== District 39 ===
Incumbent Democrat Armando Martinez won re-election.

District 39 general election
Party	Candidate	Votes	%
Democratic	Armando Martinez (incumbent)	26,962	60.9%
Republican	Jimmie Garcia	17,308	39.1%
Total votes		44,270	100%
Democratic hold			

=== District 40 ===
Incumbent Democrat Terry Canales won re-election unopposed.

District 40 general election
Party	Candidate	Votes	%
Democratic	Terry Canales (incumbent)	34,671	100%
Total votes		34,671	100%
Democratic hold			

=== District 41 ===
District 41 election
- November 5, 2024
Nominee	Robert Guerra	John Robert Guerra
Party	Democratic	Republican
Popular vote	30,589	26,618
Percentage	53.47%	46.53%
- Precinct results Guerra: 50–60% 60–70% >90% Guerra: 50–60% 70–80% >90%
State representative before election
Robert Guerra
Democratic
Elected State representative
Robert Guerra
Democratic

Incumbent Democrat Robert Guerra won re-election. John Robert "Doc" Guerra, a frequent Republican candidate for this seat, was unable to have his nickname appear on the ballot, unlike in previous election cycles, leading to fear of voter confusion.

District 41 general election
Party	Candidate	Votes	%
Democratic	Robert Guerra (incumbent)	30,589	53.47%
Republican	John Robert Guerra	26,618	46.53%
Total votes		57,207	100%
Democratic hold			

=== District 42 ===
Incumbent Democrat Richard Raymond won re-election unopposed.

District 42 general election
Party	Candidate	Votes	%
Democratic	Richard Raymond (incumbent)	38,584	100%
Total votes		38,584	100%
Democratic hold			

=== District 43 ===
Incumbent Republican Jose Manuel Lozano Jr. won re-election. Lozano voted for the impeachment of attorney general Ken Paxton, but he later expressed regret for the vote.

District 43 general election
Party	Candidate	Votes	%
Republican	Jose Manuel Lozano Jr. (incumbent)	43,812	66.73%
Democratic	Mariana Casarez	21,842	33.27%
Total votes		65,654	100%
Republican hold			

=== District 44 ===
Republican runoff results by precinct: Schoolcraft—80–90% Schoolcraft—70–80% Schoolcraft—60–70% Schoolcraft—50–60% Kuempel—50–60% Kuempel—60–70% Kuempel—70–80% Kuempel—90–100% No vote

Incumbent Republican John Kuempel ran for re-election. Former state representative Alan Schoolcraft challenged Kuempel due to his opposition to school voucher legislation and forced him into a runoff. Schoolcraft defeated Kuempel in the runoff.

District 44 Republican primary
Party	Candidate	Votes	%
Republican	Alan Schoolcraft	10,922	48.09%
Republican	John Kuempel (incumbent)	10,231	45.04%
Republican	Greg Switzer	1,036	4.56%
Republican	David Freimarck	524	2.31%
Total votes		22,713	100.00%

District 44 Republican primary runoff
Party	Candidate	Votes	%
Republican	Alan Schoolcraft	8,914	55.54%
Republican	John Kuempel (incumbent)	7,136	44.46%
Total votes		16,050	100.00%

District 44 general election
Party	Candidate	Votes	%
Republican	Alan Schoolcraft	57,466	65.12%
Democratic	Eric Norman	30,780	34.88%
Total votes		88,246	100%
Republican hold			

=== District 45 ===
Incumbent Democrat Erin Zwiener won re-election. She defeated lawyer Chevo Pastrano in the Democratic primary.

District 45 Democratic primary
Party	Candidate	Votes	%
Democratic	Erin Zwiener (incumbent)	8,297	70.98%
Democratic	Chevo Pastrano	3,386	29.02%
Total votes		11,669	100.00%

District 45 general election
Party	Candidate	Votes	%
Democratic	Erin Zwiener (incumbent)	52,912	56.76%
Republican	Tennyson Moreno	40,312	43.24%
Total votes		93,224	100%
Democratic hold			

=== District 46 ===
Incumbent Democrat Sheryl Cole won re-election.

District 46 general election
Party	Candidate	Votes	%
Democratic	Sheryl Cole (incumbent)	60,832	73.24%
Republican	Nikki Kosich	22,223	26.76%
Total votes		83,055	100%
Democratic hold			

=== District 47 ===
Incumbent Democrat Vikki Goodwin won re-election.

District 47 general election
Party	Candidate	Votes	%
Democratic	Vikki Goodwin (incumbent)	59,016	60.17%
Republican	Scott Firsing	39,066	39.83%
Total votes		98,082	100%
Democratic hold			

=== District 48 ===
Incumbent Democrat Donna Howard won re-election.

District 48 general election
Party	Candidate	Votes	%
Democratic	Donna Howard (incumbent)	72,631	83.00%
Libertarian	Daniel Jerome McCarthy	14,871	17.00%
Total votes		87,502	100%
Democratic hold			

=== District 49 ===
Incumbent Democrat Gina Hinojosa won re-election unopposed.

District 49 general election
Party	Candidate	Votes	%
Democratic	Gina Hinojosa (incumbent)	80,498	100%
Total votes		80,498	100%
Democratic hold			

=== District 50 ===
Incumbent Democrat James Talarico won re-election. He defeated Nathan Boynton in the Democratic primary.

District 50 Democratic primary
Party	Candidate	Votes	%
Democratic	James Talarico (incumbent)	8,015	84.43%
Democratic	Nathan Boynton	1,478	15.57%
Total votes		9,493	100.00%

District 50 general election
Party	Candidate	Votes	%
Democratic	James Talarico (incumbent)	48,289	100%
Total votes		48,289	100%
Democratic hold			

=== District 51 ===
Incumbent Democrat Lulu Flores won re-election unopposed.

District 51 general election
Party	Candidate	Votes	%
Democratic	Lulu Flores (incumbent)	52,801	100%
Total votes		52,801	100%
Democratic hold			

=== District 52 ===
Incumbent Republican Caroline Harris-Davila ran for re-election. This election was considered potentially competitive prior to the election; statewide Republicans had consistently won the district by only single-digit margins in 2020 and 2022, and the district was experiencing rapid population growth. Democrat Jennie Birkholz campaigned heavily on her opposition to school vouchers and her support for abortion rights, while Harris-Davila campaigned on border security and school vouchers. The Williamson County-based district 52 had been redrawn to become much more Republican-leaning during the 2021 redistricting cycle. Harris-Davila won re-election by a larger than expected margin.

District 52 Democratic primary
Party	Candidate	Votes	%
Democratic	Jennie Birkholz	3,654	50.80%
Democratic	Angel Carroll	3,539	49.20%
Total votes		7,193	100.00%

District 52 general election
Party	Candidate	Votes	%
Republican	Caroline Harris-Davila (incumbent)	62,830	56.24%
Democratic	Jennie Birkholz	48,884	43.76%
Total votes		111,714	100%
Republican hold			

=== District 53 ===
Incumbent Republican Andrew Murr retired. Murr had been targeted by conservatives over his role leading the impeachment of attorney general Ken Paxton, as well as his opposition to school voucher legislation. Wesley Virdell, who had challenged Murr in the 2022 election, ran again to succeed him. Governor Greg Abbott did not endorse a candidate in the primary, despite Hatch Smith's skepticism of school vouchers. Smith received support from former governor Rick Perry and raised significantly more money than Virdell, a large portion of which came from only two organizations. Virdell, on the other hand, received endorsements from attorney general Ken Paxton and former president Donald Trump, which proved more than powerful enough to overcome Smith's financial advantage, allowing Virdell to win the primary by a large margin. Virdell won the general election by an even larger margin.

District 53 Republican primary
Party	Candidate	Votes	%
Republican	Wes Virdell	24,038	60.45%
Republican	Hatch Smith	15,729	39.55%
Total votes		39,767	100.00%

District 53 general election
Party	Candidate	Votes	%
Republican	Wes Virdell	76,176	76.59%
Democratic	Joe Herrera	21,058	21.17%
Libertarian	B. W. Holk	2,230	2.24%
Total votes		99,464	100%
Republican hold			

=== District 54 ===
Incumbent Republican Brad Buckley won re-election. Buckley was one of the primary authors of the school voucher legislation that failed to pass in the 88th Texas Legislature.

District 54 general election
Party	Candidate	Votes	%
Republican	Brad Buckley (incumbent)	34,526	61.09%
Democratic	Dawn Richardson	21,993	38.91%
Total votes		56,519	100%
Republican hold			

=== District 55 ===
Republican primary results by precinct: Hickland—80–90% Hickland—70–80% Hickland—60–70% Hickland—50–60% Hickland—40–50% Shine—40–50% Shine—50–60%

Incumbent Republican Hugh Shine ran for re-election but lost renomination to Hillary Hickland. He had been targeted for a primary challenge due to his opposition to school voucher legislation.

District 55 Republican primary
Party	Candidate	Votes	%
Republican	Hillary Hickland	9,115	53.11%
Republican	Hugh Shine (incumbent)	6,781	39.51%
Republican	Davis Ford	775	4.52%
Republican	Jorge Estrada	493	2.87%
Total votes		17,164	100.00%

District 55 general election
Party	Candidate	Votes	%
Republican	Hillary Hickland	39,455	57.41%
Democratic	Jennifer Lee	29.269	42.59%
Total votes		68,724	100%
Republican hold			

=== District 56 ===
Republican primary results by precinct: Curry—80–90% Curry—70–80% Curry—60–70% Curry—50–60% Tie—50% Duke—50–60% No vote

Incumbent Republican Charles Anderson announced his intention to not seek re-election in late 2023. Pat Curry, who received an endorsement from governor Greg Abbott, won the Republican primary to succeed him. Anderson resigned from his seat early in August 2024, asking that a special election be held concurrently with the general election to give his successor a seniority advantage. Only Curry and Erin Shank, the Democratic nominee, qualified for the special election, leading to identical special and general elections.

District 56 Republican primary
Party	Candidate	Votes	%
Republican	Pat Curry	15,153	58.12%
Republican	Devvie Duke	10,917	41.88%
Total votes		26,070	100.00%

District 56 special election
Party	Candidate	Votes	%
Republican	Pat Curry	55,928	68.49%
Democratic	Erin Shank	25,695	31.51%
Total votes		81,623	100%
Republican hold			

District 56 general election
Party	Candidate	Votes	%
Republican	Pat Curry	56,195	68.59%
Democratic	Erin Shank	25,733	31.41%
Total votes		81,928	100%
Republican hold			

=== District 57 ===
Incumbent Republican Richard Hayes won re-election.

District 57 general election
Party	Candidate	Votes	%
Republican	Richard Hayes (incumbent)	51,865	58.27%
Democratic	Collin Johnson	34,279	38.51%
Libertarian	Darren Hamilton	2,870	3.22%
Total votes		89,014	100%
Republican hold			

=== District 58 ===
Republican runoff results by precinct: Kerwin—70–80% Kerwin—60–70% Kerwin—50–60% Burns—50–60% Burns—60–70% Burns—70–80%

Incumbent Republican DeWayne Burns ran for re-election. He was targeted for a primary challenge due to his opposition to school voucher legislation. Helen Kerwin defeated Burns in the runoff election.

District 58 Republican primary
Party	Candidate	Votes	%
Republican	Helen Kerwin	11,535	48.90%
Republican	DeWayne Burns (incumbent)	9,724	41.22%
Republican	Lyndon Laird	2,330	9.88%
Total votes		23,589	100.00%

District 58 Republican primary runoff
Party	Candidate	Votes	%
Republican	Helen Kerwin	7,685	57.54%
Republican	DeWayne Burns (incumbent)	5,670	42.46%
Total votes		13,355	100.00%

District 58 general election
Party	Candidate	Votes	%
Republican	Helen Kerwin	63,760	82.06%
Libertarian	Richard Windmann	13,935	17.94%
Total votes		77,695	100%
Republican hold			

=== District 59 ===
Incumbent Republican Shelby Slawson won re-election. Slawson, a member of the House Republican leadership team, launched a run for speaker of the House against incumbent Dade Phelan after the primary runoff, joining fellow Republican Tom Oliverson in the race.

District 59 general election
Party	Candidate	Votes	%
Republican	Shelby Slawson (incumbent)	64,147	80.67%
Democratic	Hannah Bohm	15,367	19.33%
Total votes		79,514	100%
Republican hold			

=== District 60 ===
Republican primary results by precinct: Olcott: 70–80% 60–70% 50–60% / Rogers: 60–70% 50–60%

Incumbent Republican Glenn Rogers ran for re-election but lost renomination to Mike Olcott. He had been targeted for a primary challenge due to his opposition to school voucher legislation.

District 60 Republican primary
Party	Candidate	Votes	%
Republican	Mike Olcott	25,282	63.41%
Republican	Glenn Rogers (incumbent)	14,587	36.59%
Total votes		39,869	100.00%

District 60 general election
Party	Candidate	Votes	%
Republican	Mike Olcott	93,326	100%
Total votes		93,326	100%
Republican hold			

=== District 61 ===
Republican runoff results by precinct: Richardson—80–90% Richardson—70–80% Richardson—60–70% Richardson—50–60% Tie—50% Frazier—50–60% Frazier—60–70%

Incumbent Republican Frederick Frazier ran for re-election. He was targeted for a primary challenge due to his support of the impeachment of attorney general Ken Paxton. Paxton endorsed challengers Chuck Branch and Keresa Richardson, and Richardson forced Frazier into a runoff. Richardson attacked Frazier both over his vote on the Paxton impeachment as well as over charges that he impersonated an election official during the 2022 election. Frazier pled no contest to both charges in December 2023 and was granted deferred adjudication, dismissing the charges after he completed his probation sentence in April 2024. Richardson defeated Frazier in the runoff.

District 61 Republican primary
Party	Candidate	Votes	%
Republican	Keresa Richardson	7,241	39.75%
Republican	Frederick Frazier (incumbent)	5,847	32.09%
Republican	Chuck Branch	5,130	28.16%
Total votes		18,218	100.00%

District 61 Republican primary runoff
Party	Candidate	Votes	%
Republican	Keresa Richardson	6,842	67.65%
Republican	Frederick Frazier (incumbent)	3,272	32.35%
Total votes		10,114	100.00%

District 61 general election
Party	Candidate	Votes	%
Republican	Keresa Richardson	58,513	59.62%
Democratic	Tony Adams	36,932	40.38%
Total votes		98,145	100%
Republican hold			

=== District 62 ===
Republican primary results by precinct: Luther: 70–80% 60–70% 50–60% / Smith: 60–70% 50–60% / Tie: 50%

Incumbent Republican Reggie Smith ran for re-election but lost renomination to Shelley Luther. Luther challenged Smith due to his opposition to school voucher legislation, but she did not receive an endorsement from Greg Abbott. Luther had sharply criticized the governor's policies related to COVID-19, defying orders to shut down her business amid the pandemic.

District 62 Republican primary
Party	Candidate	Votes	%
Republican	Shelley Luther	16,971	53.41%
Republican	Reggie Smith (incumbent)	14,803	46.59%
Total votes		31,774	100.00%

District 62 general election
Party	Candidate	Votes	%
Republican	Shelley Luther	67,062	77.71%
Democratic	Tiffany Drake	19,240	22.29%
Total votes		86,302	100%
Republican hold			

=== District 63 ===
Incumbent Republican Ben Bumgarner won re-election. He faced multiple Republican primary challengers, and defeated former Democratic state representative Michelle Beckley in the general election.

District 63 Republican primary
Party	Candidate	Votes	%
Republican	Ben Bumgarner (incumbent)	9,762	59.26%
Republican	Vincent Gallo	5,816	35.31%
Republican	Carlos Andino	894	5.43%
Total votes		16,472	100.00%

District 63 Democratic primary
Party	Candidate	Votes	%
Democratic	Michelle Beckley	3,985	66.37%
Democratic	Denise Wooten	2,019	33.63%
Total votes		6,004	100.00%

District 63 general election Results
Party	Candidate	Votes	%
Republican	Ben Bumgarner (incumbent)	46,861	55.66%
Democratic	Michelle Beckley	37.326	44.34%
Total votes		84,187	100%
Republican hold			

=== District 64 ===
Republican runoff results by precinct: Hopper: 80–90% 70–80% 60–70% 50–60% / Stucky: 100% 80–90% 70–80% 60–70% 50–60% / Tie: 50%

Incumbent Republican Lynn Stucky ran for re-election. Andy Hopper forced Stucky into a runoff, a rematch of the 2022 election which Stucky won by 94 votes. Hopper attacked Stucky over his vote to impeach attorney general Ken Paxton and accused him of being insufficiently conservative. Stucky, in turn, attacked Hopper for donations he received in connection to white supremacist Nick Fuentes. Hopper defeated Stucky in the runoff election.

District 64 Republican primary
Party	Candidate	Votes	%
Republican	Andy Hopper	11,746	46.67%
Republican	Lynn Stucky (incumbent)	10,895	43.29%
Republican	Elaine Hays	2,528	10.04%
Total votes		25,169	100.00%

District 64 Republican primary runoff
Party	Candidate	Votes	%
Republican	Andy Hopper	8,951	58.09%
Republican	Lynn Stucky (incumbent)	6,458	41.91%
Total votes		15,409	100.00%

District 64 general election
Party	Candidate	Votes	%
Republican	Andy Hopper	59,542	63.12%
Democratic	Angela Brewer	34,786	36.88%
Total votes		94,328	100%
Republican hold			

=== District 65 ===
Republican primary results by precinct: Little: 70–80% 60–70% 50–60% / Thimesch: 60–70% 50–60% / No vote:

Incumbent Republican Kronda Thimesch ran for re-election but lost renomination to Mitch Little. She was targeted for a primary challenge due to her support of the impeachment of attorney general Ken Paxton.

District 65 Republican primary
Party	Candidate	Votes	%
Republican	Mitch Little	10,971	50.68%
Republican	Kronda Thimesch (incumbent)	10,675	49.32%
Total votes		21,646	100.00%

District 65 general election
Party	Candidate	Votes	%
Republican	Mitch Little	60,284	60.3%
Democratic	Detrick Deburr	39,686	39.7%
Total votes		99,970	100%
Republican hold			

=== District 66 ===
Incumbent Republican Matt Shaheen won re-election. He was targeted for a primary challenge due to his support of the impeachment of attorney general Ken Paxton.

District 66 Republican primary
Party	Candidate	Votes	%
Republican	Matt Shaheen (incumbent)	11,037	63.75%
Republican	Wayne Richard	6,276	36.25%
Total votes		17,313	100.00%

District 66 general election
Party	Candidate	Votes	%
Republican	Matt Shaheen (incumbent)	58,294	61.11%
Democratic	David Carstens	37,098	38.89%
Total votes		95,392	100%
Republican hold			

=== District 67 ===
Incumbent Republican Jeff Leach won re-election. He was targeted for a primary challenge due to his support of the impeachment of attorney general Ken Paxton.

District 67 Republican primary
Party	Candidate	Votes	%
Republican	Jeff Leach (incumbent)	11,260	65.12%
Republican	Daren Meis	6,031	34.88%
Total votes		17,291	100.00%

District 67 Democratic primary
Party	Candidate	Votes	%
Democratic	Makala Washington	3,668	65.88%
Democratic	Jefferson Nunn	1,900	34.12%
Total votes		5,568	100.00%

District 67 general election
Party	Candidate	Votes	%
Republican	Jeff Leach (incumbent)	56,107	60.23%
Democratic	Makala Washington	37,051	39.77%
Total votes		93,158	100%
Republican hold			

=== District 68 ===
Incumbent Republican David Spiller won re-election. He was targeted for a primary challenge due to his support of the impeachment of attorney general Ken Paxton.

District 68 Republican primary
Party	Candidate	Votes	%
Republican	David Spiller (incumbent)	23,091	66.98%
Republican	Kerri Kingsbery	11,384	33.02%
Total votes		34,475	100.00%

District 68 general election
Party	Candidate	Votes	%
Republican	David Spiller (incumbent)	79,554	87.17%
Democratic	Stacey Swann	11,705	12.83%
Total votes		91,259	100%
Republican hold			

=== District 69 ===
Incumbent Republican James Frank won re-election. Frank launched a run for speaker of the House against incumbent Dade Phelan in September becoming the fourth Republican to do so. He pledged to improve communication between the House and statewide officials and to decentralize power from the speaker, giving it to individual members.

District 69 general election
Party	Candidate	Votes	%
Republican	James Frank (incumbent)	53,583	78.68%
Democratic	Walter Coppage	14,518	21.32%
Total votes		68,101	100%
Republican hold			

=== District 70 ===
District 70 election
- November 5, 2024
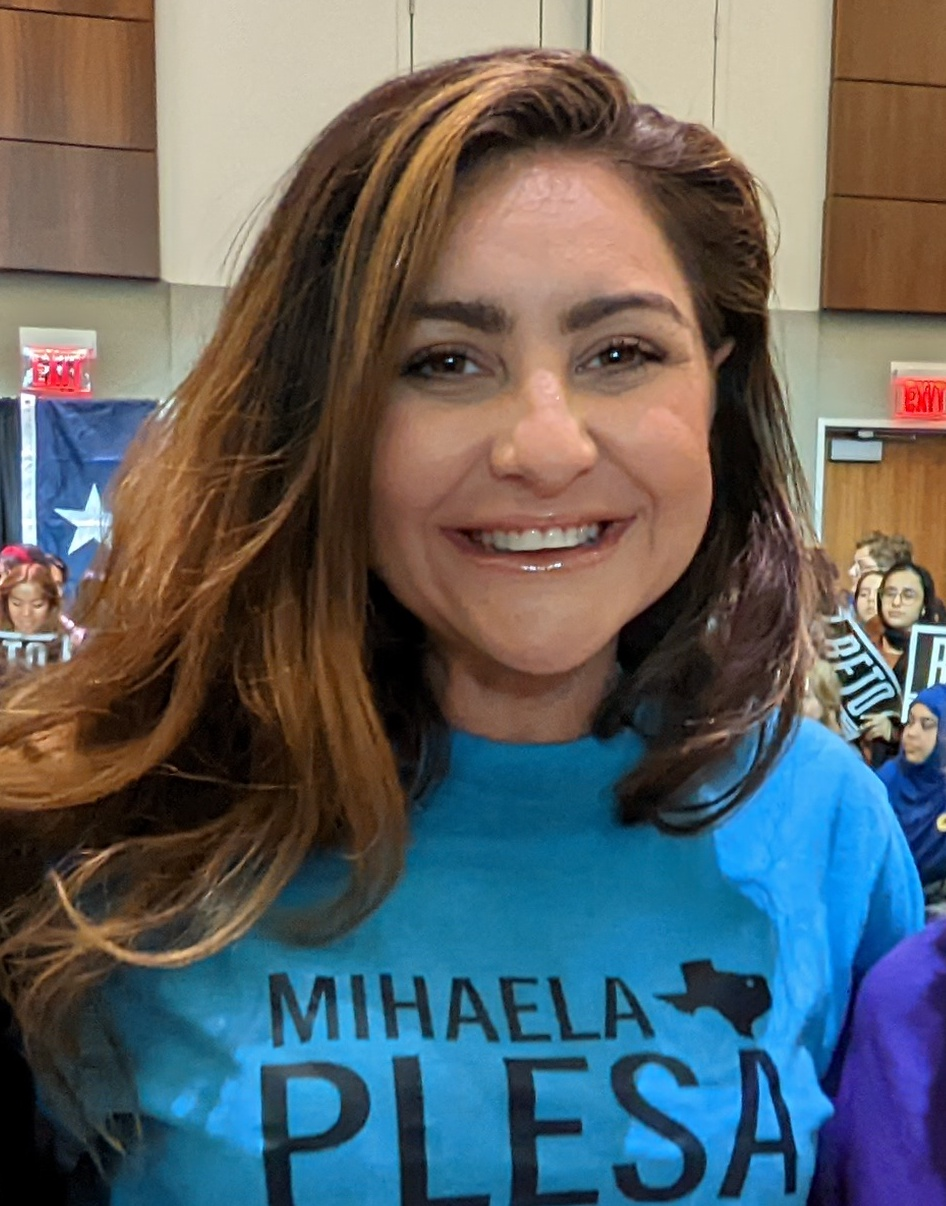

Nominee	Mihaela Plesa	Steve Kinard
Party	Democratic	Republican
Popular vote	38,183	34,993
Percentage	52.22%	47.78%
- Precinct results Plesa: 50–60% 60–70% >90% Kinard: 50–60% 60–70%
State representative before election
Mihaela Plesa
Democratic
Elected State representative
Mihaela Plesa
Democratic

Incumbent Democrat Mihaela Plesa won re-election after flipping the Collin County district in 2022. Plesa was considered a top Republican target for this election. School vouchers were a primary issue in the general election campaign, with Plesa citing the high quality of public schools in Plano ISD as a primary reason people move to the area and Kinard arguing that school choice is necessary for parents who believe that public schools do not align with their values. Immigration and abortion were also key issues in the race.

District 70 Republican primary
Party	Candidate	Votes	%
Republican	Steve Kinard	6,673	68.11%
Republican	Joe Collins	3,125	31.89%
Total votes		9,798	100.00%

District 70 general election
Party	Candidate	Votes	%
Democratic	Mihaela Plesa (incumbent)	38,183	52.22%
Republican	Steve Kinard	34,933	47.78%
Total votes		73,116	100%
Democratic hold			

=== District 71 ===
Republican primary results by precinct: Lambert: 70–80% 60–70% 50–60% / Case: 70–80% 60–70% 50–60%

Incumbent Republican Stan Lambert won re-election. He was targeted in the Republican primary for his votes to impeach attorney general Ken Paxton and against school voucher legislation.

District 71 Republican primary
Party	Candidate	Votes	%
Republican	Stan Lambert (incumbent)	14,011	52.40%
Republican	Liz Case	12,725	47.60%
Total votes		26,736	100.00%

District 71 general election
Party	Candidate	Votes	%
Republican	Stan Lambert (incumbent)	58,413	81.03%
Democratic	Linda Goolsbee	13,678	18.97%
Total votes		72,091	100%
Republican hold			

=== District 72 ===
Republican primary results by precinct.: Darby: 80–90% 70–80% 60–70% 50–60% / Bradley: 100% 70–80% 60–70% 50–60% / No vote:

Incumbent Republican Drew Darby won re-election. He was targeted for a primary challenge due to his opposition to school voucher legislation.

District 72 Republican primary
Party	Candidate	Votes	%
Republican	Drew Darby (incumbent)	14,112	56.96%
Republican	Stormy Bradley	10,665	43.04%
Total votes		24,777	100.00%

District 72 general election
Party	Candidate	Votes	%
Republican	Drew Darby (incumbent)	57,821	100%
Total votes		57,821	100%
Republican hold			

=== District 73 ===
Incumbent Republican Carrie Isaac won re-election.

District 73 general election
Party	Candidate	Votes	%
Republican	Carrie Isaac (incumbent)	91,924	71.47%
Democratic	Sally Duval	36,686	28.52%
Total votes		128,610	100%
Republican hold			

=== District 74 ===
District 74 election
- November 5, 2024
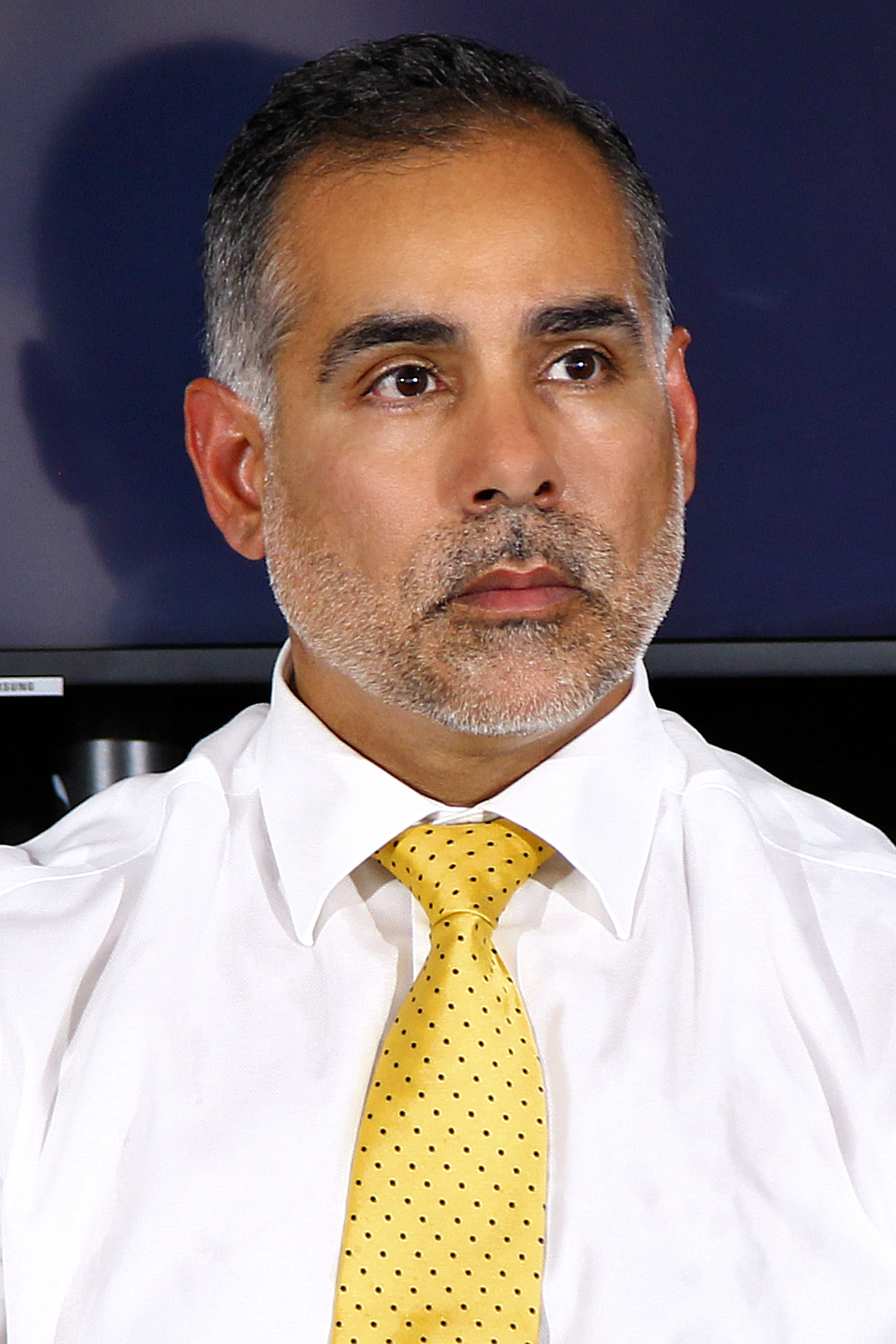

Nominee	Eddie Morales	Robert Garza
Party	Democratic	Republican
Popular vote	28,203	26,378
Percentage	51.67%	48.33%
- Morales: 50–60% 60–70% 70–80% Garza: 50–60% 60–70% 70–80% 80–90%
State representative before election
Eddie Morales
Democratic
Elected State representative
Eddie Morales
Democratic

Republican primary results by precinct.: Garza: 100% 80–90% 70–80% 60–70% 50–60% / McLeon: 100% 80–90% 70–80% 60–70% 50–60% / No vote:

Incumbent Democrat Eddie Morales narrowly won re-election. First elected in 2020, Morales was considered one of the most conservative Democrats in the chamber. He frequently broke with his party on immigration issues, attacking Democratic President Joe Biden for his administration's policies. The district was considered highly competitive ahead of election day, and both sides spent heavily on the race.

District 74 Republican primary
Party	Candidate	Votes	%
Republican	Robert Garza	4,249	53.95%
Republican	John McLeon	3,627	46.05%
Total votes		7,876	100.00%

District 74 general election
Party	Candidate	Votes	%
Democratic	Eddie Morales (incumbent)	28,203	51.67%
Republican	Robert Garza	26,378	48.33%
Total votes		54,581	100%
Democratic hold			

=== District 75 ===
Incumbent Democrat Mary González won re-election unopposed.

District 75 general election
Party	Candidate	Votes	%
Democratic	Mary González	35,033	100%
Total votes		35,033	100%
Democratic hold			

=== District 76 ===
Incumbent Democrat Suleman Lalani won re-election. He defeated social worker and school choice activist Vanesia Johnson in the Democratic primary.

District 76 Democratic primary
Party	Candidate	Votes	%
Democratic	Suleman Lalani (incumbent)	6,494	63.47%
Democratic	Vanesia Johnson	3,738	36.53%
Total votes		10,232	100.00%

District 76 Republican primary
Party	Candidate	Votes	%
Republican	Summara Kanwal	2,771	35.64%
Republican	Lea Simmons	2,761	35.51%
Republican	Dayo David	2,244	28.86%
Total votes		7,776	100.00%

District 76 Republican primary runoff
Party	Candidate	Votes	%
Republican	Lea Simmons	641	67.19%
Republican	Summara Kanwal	313	32.81%
Total votes		954	100.00%

District 76 general election
Party	Candidate	Votes	%
Democratic	Suleman Lalani (incumbent)	39,770	56.5%
Republican	Lea Simmons	30,615	43.5%
Total votes		70,385	100%
Democratic hold			

=== District 77 ===
Incumbent Democrat Evelina Ortega retired. The Democratic primary was crowded, including former state representative Norma Chávez, El Paso council member Alexsandra Annello, County Commissioner Vincent Perez, and Homer Reza. Chávez and Perez advanced to the Democratic primary runoff.

District 77 Democratic primary
Party	Candidate	Votes	%
Democratic	Vincent Perez	3,710	37.97%
Democratic	Norma Chávez	3,144	32.18%
Democratic	Alexsandra Annello	2,303	23.57%
Democratic	Homer Reza	613	6.27%
Total votes		9,770	100.00%

District 77 Democratic primary runoff
Party	Candidate	Votes	%
Democratic	Vincent Perez	4,874	63.89%
Democratic	Norma Chávez	2,755	36.11%
Total votes		7,629	100.00%

District 77 general election
Party	Candidate	Votes	%
Democratic	Vincent Perez	35,427	100%
Total votes		35,427	100%
Democratic hold			

=== District 78 ===
Incumbent Democrat Joe Moody won re-election unopposed.

District 78 general election
Party	Candidate	Votes	%
Democratic	Joe Moody (incumbent)	45,474	100%
Total votes		45,474	100%
Democratic hold			

=== District 79 ===
Incumbent Democrat Claudia Ordaz won re-election unopposed.

District 79 general election
Party	Candidate	Votes	%
Democratic	Claudia Ordaz (incumbent)	41,652	100%
Total votes		41,652	100%
Democratic hold			

=== District 80 ===
District 80 election
- November 5, 2024
Nominee	Don McLaughlin	Cecilia Castellano
Party	Republican	Democratic
Popular vote	31,182	21,231
Percentage	59.49%	40.51%
- McLaughlin: 50–60% 60–70% 70–80% 80–90% >90% Castellano: 50–60% 60–70%
State representative before election
Tracy King
Democratic
Elected State representative
Don McLaughlin
Republican

Incumbent Democrat Tracy King retired. King ran unopposed in 2022 and represents the only district Greg Abbott won in his 2022 re-election that simultaneously elected a Democrat to the House. As such, the districts was seen as Republican's best opportunity to win a seat from the Democrats. Former Uvalde mayor Don McLaughlin won the Republican nomination, while Democrat Cecilia Castellano defeated Rosie Cuellar, the sister of U.S. Representative Henry Cuellar, in a runoff election. In August, Castellano's house was searched as part of an investigation into alleged ballot harvesting led by attorney general Ken Paxton. Castellano denied the allegations and accused the investigations of being politically motivated. McLaughlin, who gained high name recognition due to his public response to the 2022 Robb Elementary School shooting, was seen as having a high chance to flip the district. Shortly before the general election, Cuellar crossed party lines to endorse McLaughlin against Castellano.

District 80 Democratic primary
Party	Candidate	Votes	%
Democratic	Cecilia Castellano	3,425	27.06%
Democratic	Rosie Cuellar	3,226	25.49%
Democratic	Carlos Lopez	2,932	23.17%
Democratic	Teresa Johnson Hernandez	2,286	18.06%
Democratic	Graciela Villarreal	787	6.22%
Total votes		12,656	100.00%

District 80 Democratic primary runoff
Party	Candidate	Votes	%
Democratic	Cecilia Castellano	4,347	57.89%
Democratic	Rosie Cuellar	3,162	42.11%
Total votes		7,509	100.00%

District 80 Republican primary
Party	Candidate	Votes	%
Republican	Don McLaughlin	6,371	57.96%
Republican	JR Ramirez	2,837	25.81%
Republican	Clint Powell	1,785	16.24%
Total votes		10,993	100.00%

District 80 general election
Party	Candidate	Votes	%
Republican	Don McLaughlin	31,182	59.49%
Democratic	Cecilia Castellano	21,231	40.51%
Total votes		52,413	100%
Republican gain from Democratic			

=== District 81 ===
Incumbent Republican Brooks Landgraf won re-election unopposed.

District 81 general election
Party	Candidate	Votes	%
Republican	Brooks Landgraf (incumbent)	41,508	100%
Total votes		41,508	100%
Republican hold			

=== District 82 ===
Incumbent Republican Tom Craddick, the former Speaker of the House and the longest serving member of the Texas Legislature, won re-election.

District 82 general election
Party	Candidate	Votes	%
Republican	Tom Craddick (incumbent)	50,546	82.73%
Democratic	Steven Schafersman	10,555	17.27%
Total votes		61,101	100%
Republican hold			

=== District 83 ===
Incumbent Republican Dustin Burrows won re-election. He was targeted for a primary challenge due to his support of the impeachment of attorney general Ken Paxton.

District 83 Republican primary
Party	Candidate	Votes	%
Republican	Dustin Burrows (incumbent)	17,279	68.01%
Republican	Wade Cowan	8,128	31.99%
Total votes		25,407	100.00%

District 83 general election
Party	Candidate	Votes	%
Republican	Dustin Burrows (incumbent)	69,899	100%
Total votes		69,899	100%
Republican hold			

=== District 84 ===
Incumbent Republican Carl Tepper won re-election.

District 84 general election
Party	Candidate	Votes	%
Republican	Carl Tepper (incumbent)	37,021	64.10%
Democratic	Noah Lopez	20,733	35.90%
Total votes		57,754	100%
Republican hold			

=== District 85 ===
Incumbent Republican Stan Kitzman won re-election.

District 85 Republican primary
Party	Candidate	Votes	%
Republican	Stan Kitzman (incumbent)	18,248	66.64%
Republican	Tim Greeson	9,136	33.36%
Total votes		27,384	100.00%

District 85 general election
Party	Candidate	Votes	%
Republican	Stan Kitzman (incumbent)	75,040	100%
Total votes		75,040	100%
Republican hold			

=== District 86 ===
Incumbent Republican John Smithee won re-election.

District 86 Republican primary
Party	Candidate	Votes	%
Republican	John Smithee (incumbent)	18,531	71.55%
Republican	Jamie Haynes	7,368	28.45%
Total votes		25,899	100.00%

District 86 general election
Party	Candidate	Votes	%
Republican	John Smithee (incumbent)	68,942	100%
Total votes		68,942	100%
Republican hold			

=== District 87 ===
Incumbent Republican Four Price retired. Price had voted against school voucher legislation during the previous legislative session. Greg Abbott endorsed Caroline Fairly in the primary election, the daughter of prominent Amarillo businessman Alex Fairly; both Fairlys are strong supporters of Abbott's voucher plan. She faced mild controversy due to many of her top endorsers having received campaign contributions from her father. Nonetheless, she won the primary outright against three opponents, avoiding the need for a runoff.

District 87 Republican primary
Party	Candidate	Votes	%
Republican	Caroline Fairly	11,595	59.89%
Republican	Cindi Bulla	4,533	23.41%
Republican	Richard Beyea	1,915	9.89%
Republican	Jesse Quackenbush	1,318	6.81%
Total votes		19,361	100.00%

District 87 general election
Party	Candidate	Votes	%
Republican	Caroline Fairly	42,317	79.22%
Democratic	Timothy Gassaway	11,048	20.68%
Write-in	Jeffrey McGunegle	55	0.1%
Total votes		53,420	100%
Republican hold			

=== District 88 ===
Incumbent Republican Ken King won re-election. Despite King's opposition to school voucher legislation, Karen Post, his primary challenger, did not receive an endorsement from Greg Abbott. King defeated Post by a wide margin in the primary election.

District 88 Republican primary
Party	Candidate	Votes	%
Republican	Ken King (incumbent)	17,949	77.60%
Republican	Karen Post	5,181	22.40%
Total votes		23,130	100.00%

District 88 general election
Party	Candidate	Votes	%
Republican	Ken King (incumbent)	54,093	100%
Total votes		54,093	100%
Republican hold			

=== District 89 ===
Republican primary results by precinct.: Noble: 100% 60–70% 50–60% / George: 50–60%

Incumbent Republican Candy Noble won re-election. She was targeted for a primary challenge due to her support of the impeachment of attorney general Ken Paxton. Noble defeated former Collin County Republican Party chair Abraham George in the primary. George would later be elected chair of the Texas Republican Party in May 2024. She faced Democrat Darrel Evans in the general election.

District 89 Republican primary
Party	Candidate	Votes	%
Republican	Candy Noble (incumbent)	9,579	52.60%
Republican	Abraham George	8,632	47.40%
Total votes		18,211	100.00%

District 89 general election
Party	Candidate	Votes	%
Republican	Candy Noble (incumbent)	55,900	60.63%
Democratic	Darrel Evans	36,292	39.37%
Total votes		92,192	100%
Republican hold			

=== District 90 ===
Incumbent Democrat Ramon Romero Jr. won re-election unopposed.

District 90 general election
Party	Candidate	Votes	%
Democratic	Ramon Romero Jr. (incumbent)	35,674	100%
Total votes		35,674	100%
Democratic hold			

=== District 91 ===
Republican runoff results by precinct: Lowe—100% Lowe—70–80% Lowe—60–70% Lowe—50–60% Tie—50% Klick—50–60% Klick—60–70% No vote

Incumbent Republican Stephanie Klick ran for re-election. David Lowe forced her into a runoff, a rematch of the 2022 election, attacking her voting record as insufficiently conservative. Attorney general Ken Paxton endorsed Lowe due to Klick's vote in favor of his impeachment. Lowe defeated Klick in the runoff election.

District 91 Republican primary
Party	Candidate	Votes	%
Republican	Stephanie Klick (incumbent)	7,492	48.11%
Republican	David Lowe	7,175	46.08%
Republican	Teresa Ramirez	905	5.81%
Total votes		15,572	100.00%

District 91 Republican primary runoff
Party	Candidate	Votes	%
Republican	David Lowe	4,535	56.57%
Republican	Stephanie Klick (incumbent)	3,481	43.43%
Total votes		8,016	100.00%

District 91 general election
Party	Candidate	Votes	%
Republican	David Lowe	53,970	100%
Total votes		53,970	100%
Republican hold			

=== District 92 ===
Incumbent Democrat Salman Bhojani won re-election unopposed.

District 92 general election
Party	Candidate	Votes	%
Democratic	Salman Bhojani (incumbent)	35,274	100%
Total votes		35,274	100%
Democratic hold			

=== District 93 ===
Incumbent Republican Nate Schatzline won re-election.

District 93 general election
Party	Candidate	Votes	%
Republican	Nate Schatzline (incumbent)	53,532	60.55%
Democratic	Perla Bojórquez	34,871	39.45%
Total votes		88,403	100%
Republican hold			

=== District 94 ===
Incumbent Republican Tony Tinderholt won re-election.

District 94 general election
Party	Candidate	Votes	%
Republican	Tony Tinderholt (incumbent)	43,785	55.62%
Democratic	Denise Wilkerson	34,937	44.38%
Total votes		78,722	100%
Republican hold			

=== District 95 ===
Incumbent Democrat Nicole Collier won re-election unopposed.

District 95 general election
Party	Candidate	Votes	%
Democratic	Nicole Collier (incumbent)	43,827	100%
Total votes		43,827	100%
Democratic hold			

=== District 96 ===
Incumbent Republican David Cook won re-election.

District 96 general election
Party	Candidate	Votes	%
Republican	David Cook (incumbent)	48,814	57.37%
Democratic	Ebony Turner	36,276	42.63%
Total votes		85,090	100%
Republican hold			

=== District 97 ===
Republican runoff results by precinct. McQueeney—70–80% McQueeney—60–70% McQueeney—50–60% Bean—50–60% Bean—60–70% Bean—70–80%

Incumbent Republican Craig Goldman retired to run for U.S. Representative.

District 97 Republican primary
Party	Candidate	Votes	%
Republican	Cheryl Bean	9,057	49.57%
Republican	John McQueeney	5,416	29.64%
Republican	Leslie Robnett	3,798	20.79%
Total votes		18,271	100.00%

District 97 Republican primary runoff
Party	Candidate	Votes	%
Republican	John McQueeney	5,477	51.42%
Republican	Cheryl Bean	5,175	48.58%
Total votes		10,652	100.00%

District 97 Democratic primary
Party	Candidate	Votes	%
Democratic	Diane Symons	3,083	44.12%
Democratic	Carlos Walker	2,420	34.63%
Democratic	William Thorburn	1,485	21.25%
Total votes		6,988	100.00%

District 97 Democratic primary runoff
Party	Candidate	Votes	%
Democratic	Carlos Walker	1,228	55.69%
Democratic	Diane Symons	977	44.31%
Total votes		2,205	100.00%

District 97 general election
Party	Candidate	Votes	%
Republican	John McQueeney	51,432	58.07%
Democratic	Carlos Walker	37,132	41.93%
Total votes		88,564	100%
Republican hold			

=== District 98 ===
Incumbent Republican Giovanni Capriglione won re-election.

District 98 Republican primary
Party	Candidate	Votes	%
Republican	Giovanni Capriglione (incumbent)	15,860	69.57%
Republican	Brad Schofield	6,936	30.43%
Total votes		22,796	100.00%

District 98 general election
Party	Candidate	Votes	%
Republican	Giovanni Capriglione (incumbent)	64,833	65.7%
Democratic	Scott Bryan White	33,845	34.3
Total votes		98,678	100%
Republican hold			

=== District 99 ===
Incumbent Republican Speaker Pro Tempore Charlie Geren won re-election. He was targeted for a primary challenge due to his role in the impeachment of attorney general Ken Paxton.

District 99 Republican primary
Party	Candidate	Votes	%
Republican	Charlie Geren (incumbent)	9,081	60.21%
Republican	Jack Reynolds	6,001	39.79%
Total votes		15,082	100.00%

District 99 general election
Party	Candidate	Votes	%
Republican	Charlie Geren (incumbent)	47,708	62.82%
Democratic	Mimi Coffey	28,233	37.18%
Total votes		75,941	100%
Republican hold			

=== District 100 ===
Incumbent Democrat Venton Jones won re-election. Venton, who was first elected in 2022, faced multiple primary challengers, including former Dallas City Council members Barbara Mallory Caraway and Sandra Crenshaw. Jones won the primary outright, narrowly avoiding a runoff.

District 100 Democratic primary
Party	Candidate	Votes	%
Democratic	Venton Jones (incumbent)	3,832	50.66%
Democratic	Barbara Mallory Caraway	1,952	25.81%
Democratic	Sandra Crenshaw	1,282	16.95%
Democratic	Justice McFarlane	498	6.58%
Total votes		7,564	100.00%

District 100 general election
Party	Candidate	Votes	%
Democratic	Venton Jones (incumbent)	34,119	100%
Total votes		34,119	100%
Democratic hold			

=== District 101 ===
Incumbent Democrat Chris Turner won re-election.

District 101 general election
Party	Candidate	Votes	%
Democratic	Chris Turner (incumbent)	40,337	64.94%
Republican	Clint Burgess	21,781	35.06%
Total votes		62,118	100%
Democratic hold			

=== District 102 ===
Incumbent Democrat Ana-Maria Ramos won re-election unopposed.

District 102 general election
Party	Candidate	Votes	%
Democratic	Ana-Maria Ramos (incumbent)	35,788	100%
Total votes		35,788	100%
Democratic hold			

=== District 103 ===
Incumbent Democrat Rafael Anchia won re-election unopposed.

District 103 general election
Party	Candidate	Votes	%
Democratic	Rafael Anchia (incumbent)	40,330	100%
Total votes		40,330	100%
Democratic hold			

=== District 104 ===
Incumbent Democrat Jessica González won re-election unopposed.

District 104 general election
Party	Candidate	Votes	%
Democratic	Jessica González (incumbent)	33,295	100%
Total votes		33,295	100%
Democratic hold			

=== District 105 ===
District 105 election
- November 5, 2024
Nominee	Terry Meza	Rose Cannaday
Party	Democratic	Republican
Popular vote	22,850	18,928
Percentage	54.69%	45.31%
- Precinct results Meza: 50–60% 60–70% 70–80% 80–90% Cannaday: 50–60% 60–70% No vote
State representative before election
Terry Meza
Democratic
Elected State representative
Terry Meza
Democratic

Incumbent Democrat Terry Meza won re-election.

District 105 general election
Party	Candidate	Votes	%
Democratic	Terry Meza (incumbent)	22,850	54.69%
Republican	Rose Cannaday	18,928	45.31%
Total votes		41,778	100%
Democratic hold			

=== District 106 ===
Incumbent Republican Jared Patterson won re-election.

District 106 general election
Party	Candidate	Votes	%
Republican	Jared Patterson (incumbent)	61,381	60.58%
Democratic	Hava Johnston	39,941	39.42%
Total votes		101,322	100%
Republican hold			

=== District 107 ===
Incumbent Democrat Victoria Neave retired to run for State Senate. Linda Garcia was unopposed in the Democratic primary and faced no opposition in the general election.

District 107 general election
Party	Candidate	Votes	%
Democratic	Linda Garcia	29,546	100%
Total votes		29,546	100%
Democratic hold			

=== District 108 ===
Republican primary results by precinct. Meyer—100% Meyer—60–70% Meyer—50–60% Wernick—50–60% Wernick—60–70% Wernick—100%

Incumbent Republican Morgan Meyer won re-election. He was targeted for a primary challenge due to his support of the impeachment of attorney general Ken Paxton. His challenger was also endorsed by former president Donald Trump and lieutenant governor Dan Patrick. Meyer was endorsed by governor Greg Abbott due to his support for school voucher legislation. Meyer narrowly defeated his challenger in the primary, and was expected to face one of the most competitive general elections of the cycle.

District 108 Republican primary
Party	Candidate	Votes	%
Republican	Morgan Meyer (incumbent)	12,303	51.12%
Republican	Barry Wernick	11,766	48.88%
Total votes		24,069	100.00%

District 108 Democratic primary
Party	Candidate	Votes	%
Democratic	Elizabeth Ginsberg	7,775	58.91%
Democratic	Yasmin Simon	5,423	41.09%
Total votes		13,198	100.00%

District 108 general election
Party	Candidate	Votes	%
Republican	Morgan Meyer (incumbent)	60,227	57.61%
Democratic	Elizabeth Ginsberg	44,307	42.39%
Total votes		104,534	100%
Republican hold			

=== District 109 ===
Incumbent Democrat Carl O. Sherman retired to run for U.S. Senate. Aicha Davis, a member of the State Board of Education, won the Democratic primary to succeed him and is running in the general election unopposed.

District 109 Democratic primary
Party	Candidate	Votes	%
Democratic	Aicha Davis	8,211	61.90%
Democratic	Victoria Walton	5,053	38.10%
Total votes		13,264	100.00%

District 109 general election
Party	Candidate	Votes	%
Democratic	Aicha Davis	56,138	100%
Total votes		56,138	100%
Democratic hold			

=== District 110 ===
Incumbent Democrat Toni Rose won re-election unopposed.

District 110 general election
Party	Candidate	Votes	%
Democratic	Toni Rose (incumbent)	30,618	100%
Total votes		30,618	100%
Democratic hold			

=== District 111 ===
Incumbent Democrat Yvonne Davis won re-election unopposed.

District 111 general election
Party	Candidate	Votes	%
Democratic	Yvonne Davis (incumbent)	53,039	100%
Total votes		53,039	100%
Democratic hold			

=== District 112 ===
District 112 election
- November 5, 2024
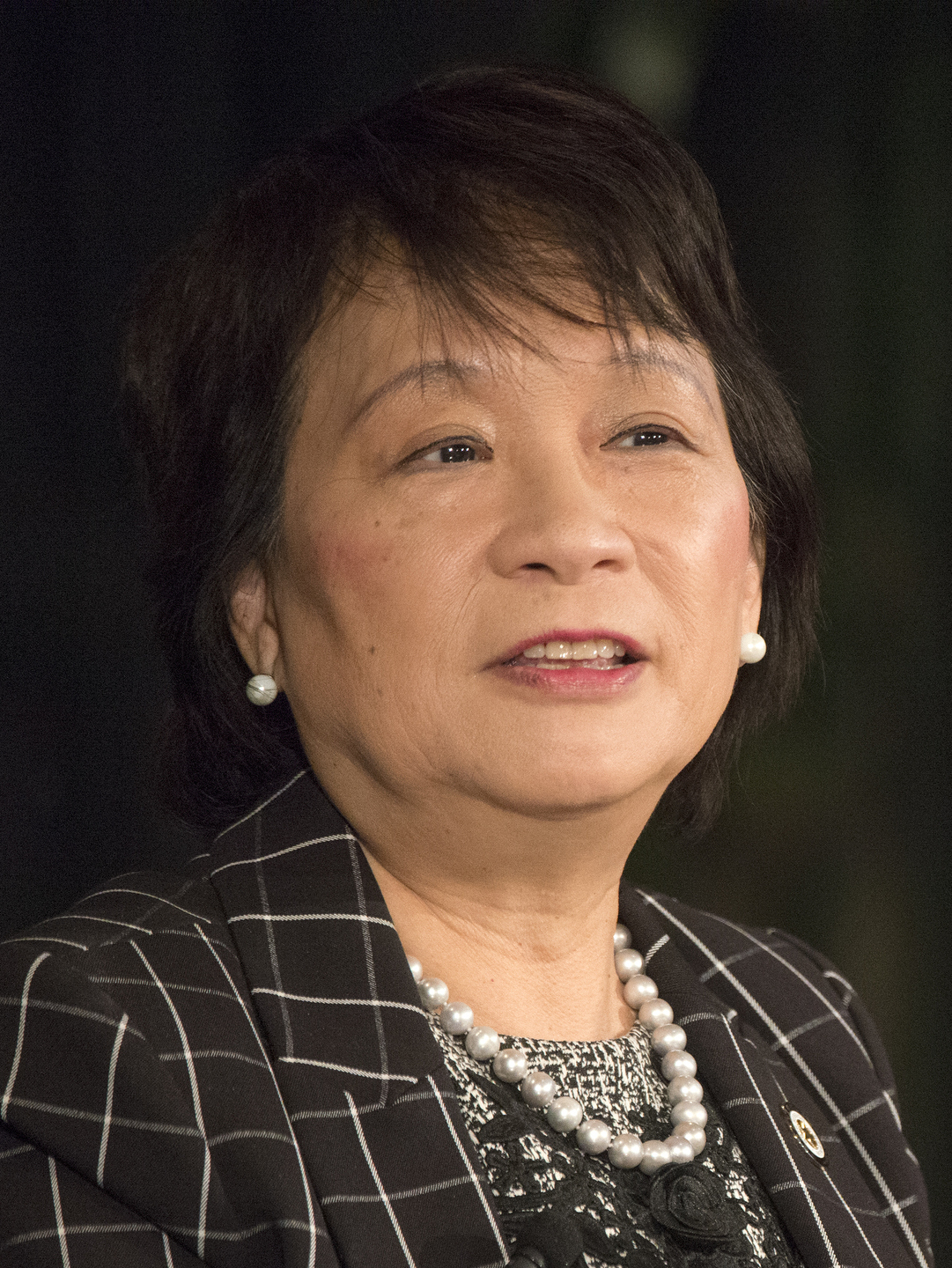

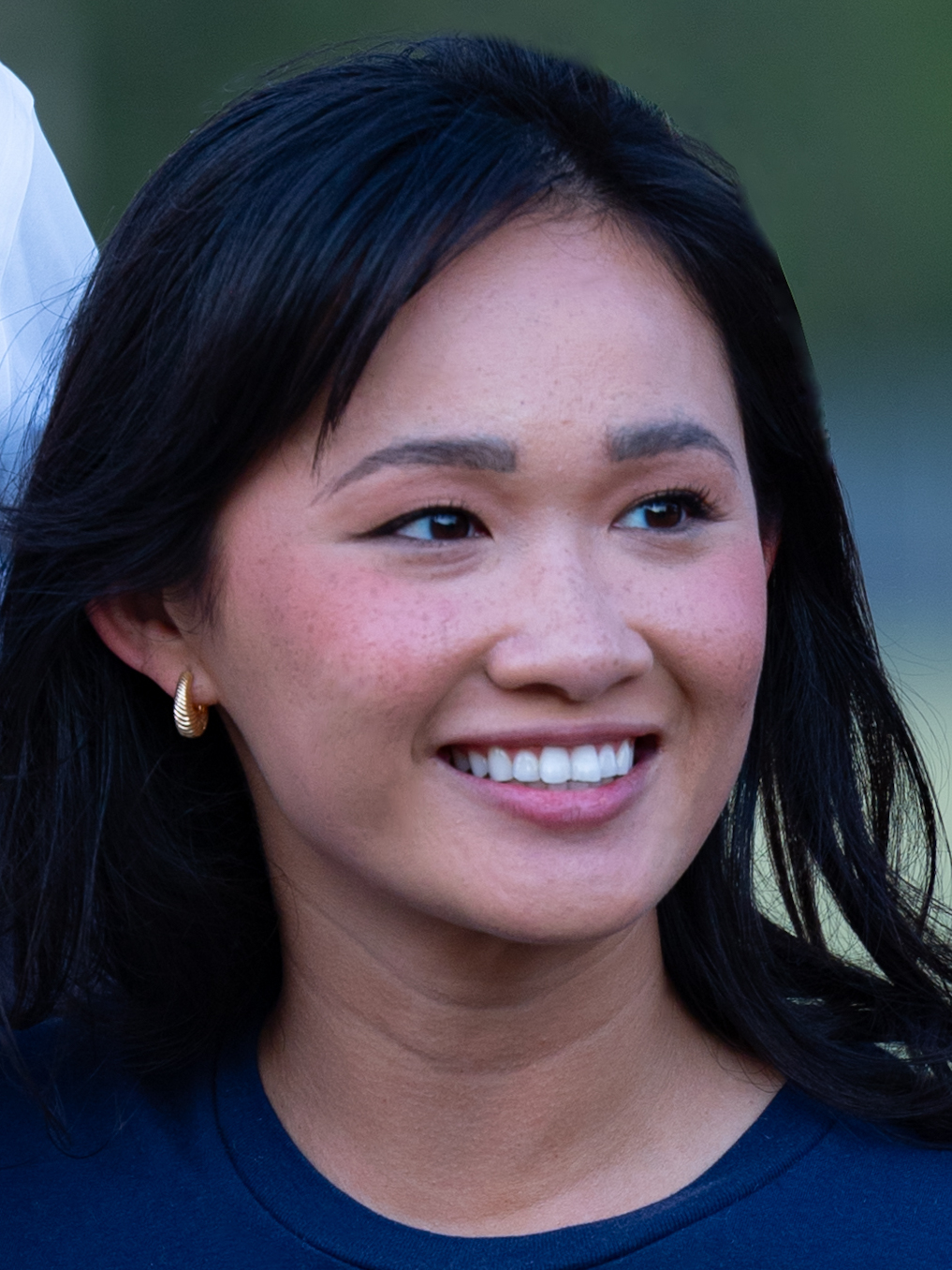
Nominee	Angie Chen Button	Averie Bishop
Party	Republican	Democratic
Popular vote	47,456	40,645
Percentage	53.87%	46.13%
- Precinct results Button: 50–60% 60–70% 70–80% 80–90% >90% Bishop: 50–60% 60–70%
State representative before election
Angie Chen Button
Republican
Elected State representative
Angie Chen Button
Republican

Incumbent Republican Angie Chen Button won re-election. She was targeted for a primary challenge due to her support of the impeachment of attorney general Ken Paxton. Averie Bishop, a former Miss Texas, is also running for the northern Dallas County district as a Democrat. Both candidates are Asian Americans in a district with a sizeable Asian population; the race between the 70 year old Button and the 28 year old Bishop is seen as a flashpoint in the political generational divide within the Asian American community. After having narrowly won re-election in 2020, favorable redistricting enabled Button to win by a much wider margin in 2022. Despite this, both parties saw the race as highly competitive and essential to determining the future of school voucher legislation in the state. Button received the endorsement of The Dallas Morning News.

District 112 Republican primary
Party	Candidate	Votes	%
Republican	Angie Chen Button (incumbent)	10,955	72.03%
Republican	Chad Carnahan	4,254	27.97%
Total votes		15,209	100.00%

Polling

Poll source	Date(s) administered	Sample size (Note: Key: A – all adults RV – registered voters LV – likely voters V – unclear)	Margin of error	Angie Chen Button (R)	Averie Bishop (D)	Undecided
Ragnar Research Partners (Note: Poll sponsored by Button's campaign)	September 3–5, 2024	300 (LV)	± 6.0%	47% (Note: With voters who lean towards a given candidate)	36%	17%

District 112 general election
Party	Candidate	Votes	%
Republican	Angie Chen Button (incumbent)	47,456	53.87%
Democratic	Averie Bishop	40,645	46.13%
Total votes		88,101	100%
Republican hold			

=== District 113 ===
Incumbent Democrat Rhetta Bowers won re-election.

District 113 general election
Party	Candidate	Votes	%
Democratic	Rhetta Bowers (incumbent)	33,547	56.59%
Republican	Stephen Stanley	25,732	43.41%
Total votes		59,279	100%
Democratic hold			

=== District 114 ===
Incumbent Democrat John Wiley Bryant won re-election.

District 114 general election
Party	Candidate	Votes	%
Democratic	John Wiley Bryant (incumbent)	43,554	62.76%
Republican	Aimee Ramsey	25,839	37.24%
Total votes		69,393	100%
Democratic hold			

=== District 115 ===
District 115 election
- November 5, 2024
Nominee	Cassandra Hernandez	John Jun
Party	Democratic	Republican
Popular vote	37,692	31,709
Percentage	54.31%	45.69%
- Precinct results Hernandez: 50–60% 60–70% 70–80% >90% Jun: 50–60% 60–70% 80–90% >90% Tie: 50% No vote
State representative before election
Julie Johnson
Democratic
Elected State representative
Cassandra Hernandez
Democratic

Incumbent Democrat Julie Johnson retired to run for U.S. Representative.

District 115 Democratic primary
Party	Candidate	Votes	%
Democratic	Cassandra Hernandez	4,618	58.40%
Democratic	Kate Rumsey	2,414	30.53%
Democratic	Scarlett Cornwallis	875	11.07%
Total votes		7,907	100.00%

District 115 general election
Party	Candidate	Votes	%
Democratic	Cassandra Hernandez	37,692	54.31%
Republican	John Jun	31,709	45.69%
Total votes		69,401	100%
Democratic hold			

=== District 116 ===
Incumbent Democrat Trey Martinez Fischer won re-election.

District 116 general election
Party	Candidate	Votes	%
Democratic	Trey Martinez Fischer (incumbent)	38,044	66.00%
Republican	Darryl Crain	19,596	34.00%
Total votes		57,640	100%
Democratic hold			

=== District 117 ===
Incumbent Democrat Phillip Cortez won re-election.

District 117 general election
Party	Candidate	Votes	%
Democratic	Philip Cortez (incumbent)	40,066	57.99%
Republican	Ben Mostyn	29,021	42.01%
Total votes		69,087	100%
Democratic hold			

=== District 118 ===
District 118 election
- November 5, 2024
Nominee	John Lujan	Kristian Carranza
Party	Republican	Democratic
Popular vote	39,246	36,624
Percentage	51.73%	48.27%
- Precinct results Lujan: 50–60% 60–70% 70–80% 80–90% >90% Ramirez: 50–60% 60–70% 70–80% 80–90% No votes
State representative before election
John Lujan
Republican
Elected State representative
John Lujan
Republican

Incumbent Republican John Lujan won re-election. Lujan narrowly won the southern Bexar County district in 2022 after flipping it in a special election the previous year. Lujan was considered a top Democratic target for this election. Democratic nominee Kristian Carranza faced criticism from Republicans over changing her surname from Thompson to Carranza, allegedly to appeal to Hispanic voters in the majority-Hispanic district, motivations which she denies. Carranza made her opposition to school voucher legislation and her support for increasing funding for public schools the primary issues of her campaign.

District 118 Democratic primary
Party	Candidate	Votes	%
Democratic	Kristian Carranza	4,091	63.14%
Democratic	Carlos Quezada	2,388	36.86%
Total votes		6,479	100.00%

District 118 general election
Party	Candidate	Votes	%
Republican	John Lujan (incumbent)	39,246	51.73%
Democratic	Kristian Carranza	36,624	48.27%
Total votes		75,870	100%
Republican hold			

=== District 119 ===
Incumbent Democrat Elizabeth Campos won re-election.

District 119 Democratic primary
Party	Candidate	Votes	%
Democratic	Elizabeth Campos (incumbent)	6,104	83.52%
Democratic	Charles Fuentes	1,204	16.48%
Total votes		7,308	100.00%

District 119 Republican primary
Party	Candidate	Votes	%
Republican	Brandon Grable	2,668	56.11%
Republican	Dan Sawatzki	2,087	43.89%
Total votes		4,755	100.00%

District 119 general election
Party	Candidate	Votes	%
Democratic	Elizabeth Campos (incumbent)	38,160	63.68%
Republican	Brandon Grable	21,763	36.32%
Total votes		59,923	100%
Democratic hold			

=== District 120 ===
Incumbent Democrat Barbara Gervin-Hawkins won re-election unopposed.

District 120 general election
Party	Candidate	Votes	%
Democratic	Barbara Gervin-Hawkins (incumbent)	38,208	100%
Total votes		38,208	100%
Democratic hold			

=== District 121 ===
District 121 election
- November 5, 2024
Nominee	Marc LaHood	Laurel Jordan Swift
Party	Republican	Democratic
Popular vote	51,013	46,104
Percentage	52.53%	47.47%
- Precinct results LaHood: 50–60% 60–70% 80–90% Swift: 50–60% 60–70% 70–80% >90% No votes
State representative before election
Steve Allison
Republican
Elected State representative
Marc LaHood
Republican

Republican primary results by precinct: LaHood—100% LaHood—80–90% LaHood—70–80% LaHood—60–70% LaHood—50–60% Tie—50% Allison—50–60% Allison—60–70% Allison—70–80% Allison—100% Champion—100% No vote

Incumbent Republican Steve Allison ran for re-election, but was defeated in the Republican primary by Marc LaHood. He was the target of a primary challenge due to his opposition to school voucher legislation. Democrats have eyed this seat as a possible pickup opportunity due to Allison's primary defeat. In the runup to the general election, both Allison and former state senator Jeff Wentworth crossed party lines to endorse Laurel Jordan Swift, the Democratic nominee, citing her support for public education and opposition to school vouchers.

District 121 Republican primary
Party	Candidate	Votes	%
Republican	Marc LaHood	11,813	53.43%
Republican	Steve Allison (incumbent)	8,723	39.45%
Republican	Michael Champion	1,573	7.11%
Total votes		22,109	100.00%

District 121 Democratic primary
Party	Candidate	Votes	%
Democratic	Laurel Jordan Swift	6,066	72.88%
Democratic	Shekhar Sinha	2,257	27.12%
Total votes		8,323	100.00%

District 121 general election
Party	Candidate	Votes	%
Republican	Marc LaHood	51,013	52.53%
Democratic	Laurel Jordan Swift	46,104	47.47%
Total votes		97,117	100%
Republican hold			

=== District 122 ===
Incumbent Republican Mark Dorazio won re-election.

District 122 general election
Party	Candidate	Votes	%
Republican	Mark Dorazio (incumbent)	64.018	58.09%
Democratic	Kevin Geary	46,180	41.91%
Total votes		110,198	100%

=== District 123 ===
Incumbent Democrat Diego Bernal won re-election unopposed.

District 123 general election
Party	Candidate	Votes	%
Democratic	Diego Bernal (incumbent)	44,043	100%
Total votes		44,043	100%
Democratic hold			

=== District 124 ===
Incumbent Democrat Josey Garcia won re-election.

District 124 general election
Party	Candidate	Votes	%
Democratic	Josey Garcia (incumbent)	30,345	61.52%
Republican	Sylvia Soto	18,981	38.48%
Total votes		49,326	100%
Democratic hold			

=== District 125 ===
Incumbent Democrat Ray Lopez won re-election.

District 125 Democratic primary
Party	Candidate	Votes	%
Democratic	Ray Lopez (incumbent)	5,849	67.59%
Democratic	Eric Garza	2,805	32.41%
Total votes		8,654	100.00%

District 125 general election
Party	Candidate	Votes	%
Democratic	Ray Lopez (incumbent)	48,251	100%
Total votes		48,251	100%
Democratic hold			

=== District 126 ===
Incumbent Republican Sam Harless won re-election.

District 126 general election
Party	Candidate	Votes	%
Republican	Sam Harless (incumbent)	59,749	98.98%
Write-in	Sarah Smith	616	1.02%
Total votes		60,365	100%
Republican hold			

=== District 127 ===
Incumbent Republican Charles Cunningham won re-election.

District 127 general election
Party	Candidate	Votes	%
Republican	Charles Cunningham (incumbent)	55,048	60.51%
Democratic	John Lehr	35,932	39.49%
Total votes		90,980	100%
Republican hold			

=== District 128 ===
Incumbent Republican Briscoe Cain won re-election.

District 128 Republican primary
Party	Candidate	Votes	%
Republican	Briscoe Cain (incumbent)	9,004	69.52%
Republican	Bianca Garcia	3,947	30.48%
Total votes		12,951	100.00%

District 128 general election
Party	Candidate	Votes	%
Republican	Briscoe Cain (incumbent)	45,372	68.24%
Democratic	Chuck Crews	19,181	28.85%
Libertarian	Kevin J. Hagan	1,932	2.91%
Total votes		66,485	100%
Republican hold			

=== District 129 ===
Incumbent Republican Dennis Paul won re-election.

District 129 general election
Party	Candidate	Votes	%
Republican	Dennis Paul (incumbent)	52,419	60.83%
Democratic	Doug Peterson	33,758	39.17%
Total votes		86,177	100%
Republican hold			

=== District 130 ===
Incumbent Republican Tom Oliverson won re-election.

District 130 Democratic primary
Party	Candidate	Votes	%
Democratic	Brett Robinson	2,430	59.66%
Democratic	Henry Arturo	1,643	40.34%
Total votes		4,073	100.00%

District 130 general election
Party	Candidate	Votes	%
Republican	Tom Oliverson (incumbent)	63,270	68.82%
Democratic	Brett Robinson	28,671	31.18%
Total votes		91,941	100%
Republican hold			

=== District 131 ===
Incumbent Democrat Alma Allen won re-election.

District 131 Democratic primary
Party	Candidate	Votes	%
Democratic	Alma Allen (incumbent)	5,147	58.78%
Democratic	James Guillory	2,101	23.99%
Democratic	Erik Wilson	1,508	17.22%
Total votes		8,756	100.00%

District 131 general election
Party	Candidate	Votes	%
Democratic	Alma Allen (incumbent)	36,948	100%
Total votes		36,948	100%
Democratic hold			

=== District 132 ===
Incumbent Republican Mike Schofield won re-election.

District 132 general election
Party	Candidate	Votes	%
Republican	Mike Schofield (incumbent)	53,928	58.76%
Democratic	Chase West	37,846	41.24%
Total votes		91,774	100%
Republican hold			

=== District 133 ===
Republican primary results by precinct.: DeAyala: 80–90% 70–80% 60–70% 50–60% / Perez: 50–60%

Incumbent Republican Mano DeAyala won re-election. He was targeted for a primary challenge due to his support of the impeachment of attorney general Ken Paxton.

District 133 Republican primary
Party	Candidate	Votes	%
Republican	Mano DeAyala (incumbent)	10,736	58.53%
Republican	John Perez	7,607	41.47%
Total votes		18,343	100.00%

District 133 general election
Party	Candidate	Votes	%
Republican	Mano DeAyala (incumbent)	54,283	100%
Total votes		54,283	100%
Republican hold			

=== District 134 ===
Incumbent Democrat Ann Johnson won re-election.

District 134 general election
Party	Candidate	Votes	%
Democratic	Ann Johnson (incumbent)	61,037	61.33%
Republican	Audrey Douglas	38,480	38.67%
Total votes		99,517	100%
Democratic hold			

=== District 135 ===
Incumbent Democrat Jon Rosenthal won re-election unopposed.

District 135 general election
Party	Candidate	Votes	%
Democratic	Jon Rosenthal (incumbent)	43,114	100%
Total votes		43,114	100%
Democratic hold			

=== District 136 ===
Incumbent Democrat John Bucy III won re-election.

District 136 general election
Party	Candidate	Votes	%
Democratic	John Bucy III (incumbent)	45,185	62.02%
Republican	Amin Salahuddin	27,665	37.98%
Total votes		72,850	100%
Democratic hold			

=== District 137 ===
Incumbent Democrat Gene Wu won re-election.

District 137 general election
Party	Candidate	Votes	%
Democratic	Gene Wu (incumbent)	19,286	76.31%
Libertarian	Lee Sharp	5,988	23.69%
Total votes		25,274	100%
Democratic hold			

=== District 138 ===
Incumbent Republican Lacey Hull won re-election.

District 138 Republican primary
Party	Candidate	Votes	%
Republican	Lacey Hull (incumbent)	8,835	61.15%
Republican	Jared Woodfill	5,613	38.85%
Total votes		14,448	100.00%

District 138 general election
Party	Candidate	Votes	%
Republican	Lacey Hull (incumbent)	42,022	57.02%
Democratic	Stephanie Morales	31,671	42.98%
Total votes		73,693	100%
Republican hold			

=== District 139 ===
Incumbent Democrat Jarvis Johnson retired to run for State Senate.

District 139 Democratic primary
Party	Candidate	Votes	%
Democratic	Angie Thibodeaux	3,672	33.29%
Democratic	Charlene Ward Johnson	2,654	24.06%
Democratic	Mo Jenkins	1,948	17.66%
Democratic	Rosalind Caesar	1,869	16.94%
Democratic	Jerry Ford	887	8.04%
Total votes		11,030	100.00%

District 139 Democratic primary runoff
Party	Candidate	Votes	%
Democratic	Charlene Ward Johnson	2,533	51.90%
Democratic	Angie Thibodeaux	2,348	48.10%
Total votes		4,881	100.00%

District 139 general election
Party	Candidate	Votes	%
Democratic	Charlene Ward Johnson	46,196	100%
Total votes		46,196	100%
Democratic hold			

=== District 140 ===
Incumbent Democrat Armando Walle won re-election unopposed.

District 140 general election
Party	Candidate	Votes	%
Democratic	Armando Walle (incumbent)	22,272	100%
Total votes		22,272	100%
Democratic hold			

=== District 141 ===
Incumbent Democrat Senfronia Thompson won re-election unopposed.

District 141 general election
Party	Candidate	Votes	%
Democratic	Senfronia Thompson (incumbent)	32,492	100%
Total votes		32,492	100%
Democratic hold			

=== District 142 ===
Incumbent Democrat Harold Dutton Jr. won re-election. He was targeted for a primary challenge due to his role in the state takeover of Houston Independent School District, as well as his votes with Republicans on LGBT issues.

District 142 Democratic primary
Party	Candidate	Votes	%
Democratic	Harold Dutton Jr. (incumbent)	5,088	60.53%
Democratic	Danny Norris	1,592	18.94%
Democratic	Joyce Chatman	1,282	15.25%
Democratic	Clint Horn	444	5.28%
Total votes		8,406	100.00%

District 142 general election
Party	Candidate	Votes	%
Democratic	Harold Dutton Jr. (incumbent)	41,430	100%
Total votes		41,430	100%
Democratic hold			

=== District 143 ===
Incumbent Democrat Ana Hernandez won re-election unopposed.

District 143 general election
Party	Candidate	Votes	%
Democratic	Ana Hernandez (incumbent)	27,796	100%
Total votes		27,796	100%
Democratic hold			

=== District 144 ===
Incumbent Democrat Mary Ann Perez won re-election unopposed.

District 144 general election
Party	Candidate	Votes	%
Democratic	Mary Ann Perez (incumbent)	26,617	100%
Total votes		26,617	100%
Democratic hold			

=== District 145 ===
Incumbent Democrat Christina Morales won re-election unopposed.

District 145 general election
Party	Candidate	Votes	%
Democratic	Christina Morales (incumbent)	46,104	100%
Total votes		46,104	100%
Democratic hold			

=== District 146 ===
Results by precinct: Simmons—90–100% Simmons—80–90% Simmons—70–80% Simmons—60–70% Simmons—50–60% Tie Thierry—50–60% Thierry—60–70% Thierry—70–80%

Incumbent Democrat Shawn Thierry ran for re-election. She was targeted for a primary challenge due to her votes with Republicans on LGBT issues. Lauren Ashley Simmons defeated Thierry in the runoff election. In August, after having lost renomination, Thierry switched to the Republican Party.

District 146 Democratic primary
Party	Candidate	Votes	%
Democratic	Lauren Ashley Simmons	6,303	49.39%
Democratic	Shawn Thierry (incumbent)	5,683	44.53%
Democratic	Ashton Woods	775	6.07%
Total votes		12,761	100.00%

District 146 Democratic primary runoff
Party	Candidate	Votes	%
Democratic	Lauren Ashley Simmons	4,287	64.56%
Democratic	Shawn Thierry (incumbent)	2,353	35.44%
Total votes		6,640	100.00%

District 146 general election
Party	Candidate	Votes	%
Democratic	Lauren Ashley Simmons	42,840	77.72%
Republican	Lance York	12,282	22.28%
Total votes		55,122	100%
Democratic gain from Republican			

=== District 147 ===
Incumbent Democrat Jolanda Jones won re-election.

District 147 general election
Party	Candidate	Votes	%
Democratic	Jolanda Jones (incumbent)	47,828	74.54%
Republican	Claudio Gutierrez	16,332	25.46%
Total votes		64,160	100%
Democratic hold			

=== District 148 ===
District 148 election
- November 5, 2024
Nominee	Penny Morales Shaw	Kay Smith
Party	Democratic	Republican
Popular vote	28,341	23,246
Percentage	54.94%	45.06%
- Precinct results Morales Shaw: 50–60% 60–70% 80–90% Smith: 50–60% 70–80% >90%
State representative before election
Penny Morales Shaw
Democratic
Elected State representative
Penny Morales Shaw
Democratic

Incumbent Democrat Penny Morales Shaw won re-election.

District 148 general election
Party	Candidate	Votes	%
Democratic	Penny Morales Shaw (incumbent)	28,341	54.94%
Republican	Kay Smith	23,246	45.06%
Total votes		51,587	100%
Democratic hold			

=== District 149 ===
Incumbent Democrat Hubert Vo won re-election.

District 149 general election
Party	Candidate	Votes	%
Democratic	Hubert Vo (incumbent)	26,921	57.02%
Republican	Lily Truong	20,291	42.98%
Total votes		47,212	100%
Democratic hold			

=== District 150 ===
Incumbent Republican Valoree Swanson won re-election.

District 150 general election
Party	Candidate	Votes	%
Republican	Valoree Swanson (incumbent)	48,000	59.86%
Democratic	Marisela Jimenez	32,181	40.14%
Total votes		80,181	100%
Republican hold			

== Notes ==
Partisan clients
