= Lynching of Roosevelt Townes and Robert McDaniels =

1937 lynching in the United States

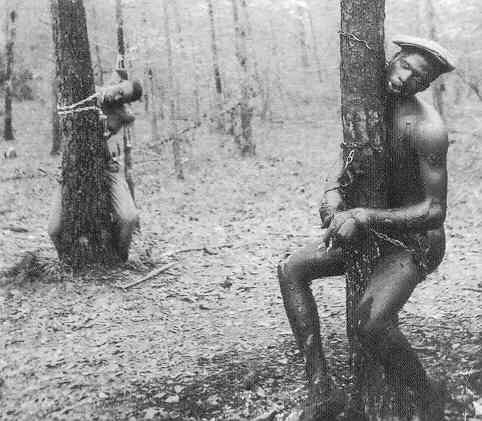
- Robert McDaniels (left) and Roosevelt Townes (right) pictured prior to being lit on fire
- Location: Duck Hill, Mississippi, US
- Date: April 13, 1937; 89 years ago
- Target: Roosevelt Townes; Robert McDaniels; "Shorty" Dorrah
- Attack type: Assault, kidnapping, murder, torture, lynching
- Weapons: Blow torch, chains, guns, rope
- Deaths: 2
- Victims: Roosevelt Townes; Robert McDaniels
- Assailant: Lynch mob
- No. of participants: est. 20 lynchers; est. 480 lynch party
- Motive: False accusation; Vigilantism; White supremacy
- Convictions: None

On April 13, 1937, Roosevelt Townes and Robert McDaniels, two black men, were lynched in Duck Hill, Mississippi, United States, by a white mob after being labeled as the murderers of a white storekeeper. They had only been legally accused of the crime a few minutes before they were kidnapped from the courthouse, chained to trees, and tortured with a blow torch. Following the torture, McDaniels was shot to death and Townes was burned alive.

Pictures taken, prior to Townes being lit on fire, were the first lynching photographs to be published by the national press. They were reprinted in Time Magazine and Life Magazine, and then in national newspapers.

== Background ==
=== Duck Hill ===
In December 1936, the greater rural Duck Hill area had a population of about 2,750, while the town of Duck Hill had fewer than 550 inhabitants, with the greater Duck Hill area accounting for under 20 percent of Montgomery County's population. The town of Duck Hill accounted for a little over 3 percent of the county's population, respectively.

The county had recently commenced the first legal hanging in its history six months prior, when Wilson Pullen, a white man, was convicted of murdering his landlord, Dave McClelland. Pullen was the first white man to hang in the state "in several years." The county also had experienced two murders, in three months, across its 20-mile radius.

At the time, the state of Mississippi led the country in homicides. At 26.2, its homicide rate was the first state to cross the 25 rate mark ever, and its 512 homicides were more than the total number of homicides in 15 states combined. Nearly 80 percent of those murdered were black.

A number of the state's murders were recorded as "trivialities" between known persons, including a disagreement over five cents, an argument over the cutting of a birthday cake, and a disagreement over killing a rabbit. In almost half of the murders, whiskey was involved. In August 1936 over 300 gallons of moonshine was confiscated from Montgomery County—it was on record as being the largest such confiscation in the state.

At the time, while the average per capita income for the nation was about $575 per year (approximately $10,500 in 2019), it was just over $215 (approximately $4,000 in 2019) for Mississippi, ranking the state last in the country. Per capita income in Montgomery County is estimated to have been about 20 percent less than the average for the state, while Duck Hill's per capita income was estimated to have been 30 percent less than the average for the county. The estimated average income per capita of blacks in Montgomery County was more than 30 percent less than whites. And more than 25 percent of black adults in the area were illiterate, where the state spent five times more on white school children than black children, and where black children only spent an average of 15–20 weeks a year in school as they were often relegated to helping their sharecropping families.

The Montgomery County Sheriff, Edgar E. Wright, had a 7th-grade education. The sheriff in the adjacent county of Grenada, D.W. Dogan, had a 10th-grade education.

== Murder of George Windham ==
On December 30, 1936, George Sam Windham, a 40-year-old crossroads county grocer, was standing in the back of his store, six miles east of Duck Hill, Mississippi, eating sardines and crackers for dinner.

"Neighbors say...a car drove up and stopped about 50 yards from Windham's store, and in about ten minutes they heard a noise, which evidently was the gunshot, but at the time they thought it was only a firecracker and were not alarmed. Some say that in something like 15 minutes that they heard the car drive away. It was about an hour and one-half after this time that several persons living near the store heard groans and went to investigate. Upon reaching the store they found Mr. Windham in a dying condition." – The Clarion-Ledger, January 1, 1937

Windham was "mysteriously" shot with a 12-gauge shotgun, allegedly through the store's window screen. However, at least one newspaper reported that Windham was shot in front of his store, rather than through the window screen. The discharge hit his right shoulder and neck. He was still alive when he was found, but died en route when taken to get medical attention.

=== Investigation ===
On December 31, the day after the murder, Sheriff Edgar E. Wright stated that Windham's store had been "ransacked" and his pockets had been "turned wrong-side out". It was reported that Windham's cash register had been robbed of $350 ($6,500 in 2019); though by April, that amount would be adjusted down to $200 (about $3,700 in 2019).

Bloody footprints were also found in the store. Sheriff Wright went on record stating that the footprints were the only clues to the murderer found in the store. However, Sheriff Wright would later state that he did not believe the "footprints or any of the evidence found in the store at that time, to be worthwhile." It was never clarified as to whether the bloody footprints were, in fact, those of Windham's in his own blood.

Windham lived with his family in the rear of the store, but he reportedly was alone when he was attacked. His wife and two children were said to be "away" for the Christmas holidays.

On January 1, the Jackson Police, along with bloodhounds, were called on to assist. In addition, broken glass and Windham's cash register were sent to a lab for fingerprints to be lifted. Jackson Police Inspector Audis E. Crawford maintained that "good [fingerprint] impressions would be obtained." However, the authorities did not state any speculated circumstance for the broken glass though Windham had reportedly been shot "through the window screen".

That same day, Sheriff Wright labeled "robbery" as the motive of the murder. Sheriff Wright also declared:

"...the assailant was familiar with the vicinity in which the crime occurred and with Mr. Windham's business and his personal habits." – The Clarion-Ledger, January 1, 1937

Later that day, two black brothers, Alvie and T.L. Dorrah, were arrested after the bloodhounds reportedly "followed a trail from the scene of the crime to their house some distance away." One of the brothers had been in Windham's store on the day of the murder. Despite admitting there was "no direct connection" between the brothers and the murder, Sheriff Wright "held them for investigation."

Alvie and T.L.'s brother, Elijah, was also arrested after Deputy Sheriff, George Blaylock claimed to have found a "muddy gun" in Elijah's home, which was reportedly the same type used in the killing. Blaylock did not state what type of gun he found in Elijah's home, only that the "bullets" for the gun didn't match those used in the murder. However, a 12-gauge shotgun accepts all 12-gauge shells. Blaylock did not state why the found gun, and the "bullets" used in the murder, did not match.

Elijah's friend, 21-year-old, Joe Ed McDaniels, was also arrested with Elijah. The two were arrested because they were inhabiting a house close to Elijah's brothers, which happened to be "where the bloodhounds ended their trail."

Sheriff Wright handed Elijah and Joe Ed to George Windham's brother, Gus, allowing him to have unaccounted for time with the men. Gus Windham would later drop the men off at the neighboring county jail in Grenada, where Elijah and Joe Ed—who maintained that they "didn't know nothing" about the crime and calling Windham, "a fine man"—reportedly declined to be in a cell together.

No charges were placed on the four men, and Sheriff Wright stated that he would keep them detained "indefinitely."

On January 3, a report began circulating that a white man had been arrested in connection with the murder. However, Sheriff Wright dismissed that report and stated that Alvie Dorrah was the "number one suspect." Maintaining his innocence, Dorrah cried and reiterated that black people in the area loved "Mr. Sam" [Windham]." He pleaded, "Heaven knows I'm innocent."

That same day, Sheriff Wright stated that there were other people "under suspicion" and that he "expected a break [in the case] soon." Wright also reiterated his belief that the crime was premeditated and "committed by a person familiar entirely with Windham's store and habits."

In the four weeks following the crime, eight black men had been detained without charges, six of whom were held in jail for at least two weeks.

In addition to Joe Ed McDaniels, and Alvie, T.L. and Elijah Dorrah, 55-year-old Leroy Weldon, and 35-year-old Bit Reed, were detained for several weeks because they were "in the vicinity" of Duck Hill on the night of the murder searching for some cows that had strayed. On January 23, Townes' 24-year-old brother-in-law, Jess Mack, was also arrested and detained for "harboring a fugitive" when stating that his brother-in-law had visited with him in the time since Windham had been killed. In addition, on January 29, a black man was detained by police officers in New York City because he "fit the description" of Townes.

However, Sheriff Wright shifted the focus onto Roosevelt Townes, a 25-year-old black man. Townes had reportedly escaped from the Grenada County Jail—with a white fellow prisoner—two weeks (or three days) prior to the murder, where he had been imprisoned for allegedly stealing corn.

=== Roosevelt Townes ===
Roosevelt "Red" Townes was originally from Hernando, Mississippi. In December 1936, the 25-year-old was living with his wife five miles north of Duck Hill in Elliot, where he had recently contracted with 67-year-old Micajah Purnell Sturdivant—a white man from Vance—to be a sharecropper on Sturdivant's property. Sturdivant's plantation was overseen by 25-year-old white man Howard Prestage.

Prestage claimed to have become "suspicious" of Townes after determining that Townes had more money on him than he thought Townes should have. Prestage did not state this suspicious amount. However, Prestage allegedly contacted Sheriff D.W. Dogan, of Grenada County, about the money. Dogan immediately ordered Prestage to arrest Townes.

Prestage approached and accused Townes, ordering another black man to search Townes while Prestage held a gun on him. However:

"Just as the negro attempted to make the search, Townes ducked and ran." – The Clarion-Ledger, January 20, 1937

Prestage claimed to have shot at Townes, several times, but missed. It was reported that, on the night that Townes ran, he snuck back on the property to get his wife, officially making them both fugitives. However, given Townes had allegedly escaped from prison, and murdered Windham days earlier, it was not reconciled how he "became" a fugitive when he already was a fugitive.

At some point, Sheriff Edgar E. Wright became adamant that Townes "had something to do it" [Windham's murder]. However, he did not state what led him to that conclusion. For example, he stated no connection between Townes and Windham or, given most black people did not have cars or access to them at the time, state how Townes would have been in the car the neighbors allegedly heard. However, on January 19, Townes was officially accused of the crime. A $500 reward was offered for his capture.

On January 20, The Clarion-Ledger printed that unnamed "officers" said that "circumstantial evidence pointed strongly to Townes being the murderer."

"On the afternoon of the murder, Townes is believed to have stolen a gun and is said to have gotten another negro to buy shells for him in Elliot of the kind with which Windham was killed." – The Clarion-Ledger, January 20, 1937

It was never stated when Townes was arrested for corn theft, or how long he remained in jail before escaping. It was not reported as to why Mr. Prestage was not aware his employee was a fugitive if Townes had allegedly escaped jail more than two weeks before Mr. Prestage called the police. It also was not reported from whom, or from where, Sheriff Wright thought Townes allegedly stole the gun. No murder weapon was ever reported found. Nor was the name, or existence, of the accomplice "other negro" ever reported.

Conversely, while on January 20, it was reported that Townes had escaped jail two weeks before the murder, the timing contradicted with the April 6, by the same newspaper, which stated that Townes escaped "just three days" before the murder.

== Kidnapping and lynching ==
Sheriff Edgar E. Wright obtained a "small Kodak 10-cent snapshot of Townes" and sent it to the Jackson Bureau of Investigation where "the tiny picture was enlarged." One hundred copies were printed and sent them to "all police departments around the south."

On April 2, Townes was arrested in Memphis, Tennessee. The Memphis Police Department questioned Townes and arrested him and attributed the following confession to him:

"I stole a 12-gauge shotgun from my brother-in-law. I went to Mr. Windham's store. He was opening a box of sardines. I shot him through the window. I went into his pockets. From his lefthand pocket I took a pocketbook. I got $60 from the pocketbook and the cash register."

On April 5, the Memphis Police Department then released him to the police department of Jackson, Mississippi for "safekeeping," with its "mob-proof" county jail.

On April 6, Sheriff Wright claimed that, while Townes was in his custody, Townes had confessed to shooting Windham.

Six days later, Sheriff Wright brought Townes to the county jail, in Winona, where Townes would wait until he was to be arraigned. At some point, an acquaintance of Townes', Robert "Bootjack" McDaniels—described as "a lanky negro with powerful shoulders—was accused along with him. Authorities reported no evidence or reason for McDaniels' arrest.

The county brought retroactive indictments against both men, effectively dating their indictments as December 30, 1936.

Sheriff Wright did not request aid from the Governor in guarding the two men. Rather, on April 13, the two men were brought to the white brick courthouse around 11:15 am by Sheriff Wright and four deputies—Deputy Sheriffs Hugh Curtis and Shed Castles, and deputies Winston Blakely and McGurrah.

Townes and McDaniels, unable to afford attorneys, were appointed three local attorneys to represent them—John E. Aldridge, Vernon D. Rowe, and W.D. Davis—and stood before Judge John Allen, in Winona. Both men pleaded "not guilty. The judge then adjourned "for dinner" at 11:45 a.m.

It was stated that, following the arraignment, there was "no sign of violence;" however, it was also reported that, upon the judge calling for recess, the "crowd hurriedly left the courtroom."

Townes and McDaniels had only been legally accused of the crime a few moments when Sheriff Wright handcuffed them together. Wright and his four deputies left the courtroom "at once," to allegedly take the men back to jail, when Sheriff Wright claimed to have been met at the north door of the courthouse by a mob of about 100 men "milling about the courtyard" who said: "Let's get them."

Sheriff Wright stated that "they [the lynch mob] took me and my deputies by complete surprise." Deputy Sheriffs, Curtis and Castles, claimed that they were "overpowered" by the mob. Curtis claimed that he, Sheriff Wright, and deputies Blakely and McGurrah, were incapacitated by six men who tied their hands behind their backs. The lawmen claimed that they were "helpless," despite admitting none of them had drawn their weapons as the mob came up, and admitting that they didn't follow after Townes and McDaniels after the mob had taken them.

"I haven't heard what happened to them, of course, but there was a big crowd of men and there's no telling what happened." –– Sheriff Wright, April 13, 1937

Attorney Rowe stated that Sheriff Wright was somehow able to come back into the courthouse and make his way to the jury room—where Rowe had allegedly gone following the judge calling for recess—and tell him that "the two negroes have been taken away from us by a mob." Rowe claimed to have immediately looked for Judge Allen. Rowe stated that he ran out the front of the courthouse, where he saw Judge Allen "going to his hotel" and told him what Sheriff Wright told him. Rowe did not state why he thought the judge could be of help where five armed police officers were "helpless."

During the commotion, District Attorney Clarence Morgan stated that he watched the mob from his window:

"I had no idea we were having mob violence until it was all over...When I learned what was taking place, I looked out the window to find over fifty cars and nearly two hundred men taking the negroes away."

Townes and McDaniels were handcuffed and placed on a waiting school bus, where 15 white men crowded onto the bus with them. The bus was driven north, along Highway 51, exiting on Alva-Duck Hill Road. They drove another six miles, to a wooded area about a mile from Windham's store, with a caravan of people following, and a lengthening procession of about 40 cars joining along the way.

When the bus stopped, about 200 yards off the main road, "there were already many cars stopped and occupants unloaded" waiting in a patch of pinewood for them to arrive.

=== Lynching ===
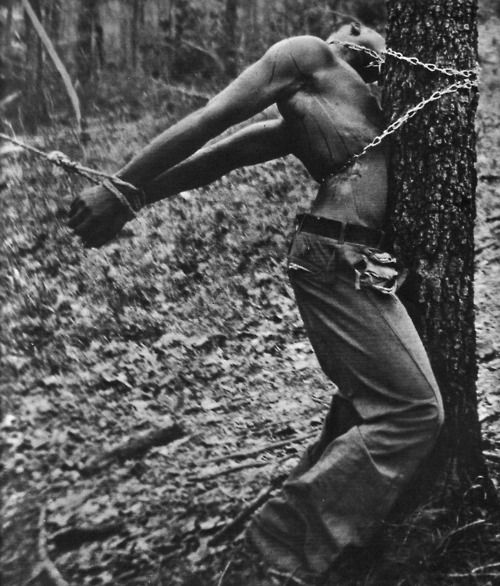
Robert McDaniels lynched. Apr. 13, 1937

While Townes and McDaniels were held on the bus, white men had placed chains around their necks and bound the two men together.

In the woods, a mob estimated to number 500 people—including women and children—watched as Townes and McDaniels were dragged from the bus, stripped of their shirts to their waists, and chained to two trees. One of the mob members brought out a "white-hot" plumbers blow torch, applying "the blue-white flame" to the bare skin of Townes and McDaniels while demanding, "Tell all you know!"

The Sheriff claimed that, under torture, Townes "readily" confessed to shooting Windham through the window, but said that McDaniels was the mastermind of the alleged robbery.

Allegedly, Townes asked the mob to tie McDaniels up next to him and torture him the same way. The mob proceeded to do so, demanding that McDaniels confess.

McDaniels maintained his innocence after being seared with the blow torch several times. However, after a few minutes of torture, he allegedly "came clean."

Conversely, under torture, McDaniels allegedly stated that Townes had killed Windham and was framing him, that he barely knew Townes and hadn't seen him in two years. He reportedly also confessed to being inside the store when Windham was killed, and then to robbing the store. The mob made him sign a confession that the robbery was planned four months in advance. He signed his name with an "X." It was not reported as to whether McDaniels or Townes were literate.

"He sobbed out his story amid screams and groans and as he continued to scream his torturers stepped back, a volley of shots rang out, and McDaniels dangled in his chains dead." –– Longview News Journal, April 14, 1937

The mob shot McDaniels numerous times, including a shot through his head that ultimately killed him.

The mob then turned its attention onto Townes, described by officers as a "dangerous negro," who was then tied around an oak tree roughly a foot in diameter.

Though having just witnessed McDaniels' death, and "signed" the confession, Townes still stated his innocence. However, "the blowtorch burned the story out of him." He began screaming to his torturers to please kill him. However, while the mob had him under duress, they "allowed" him to confess to other unsolved crimes in the area, including the burning of houses and the theft of livestock.

"Townes was struggling against his chains. He was invited to confess, then the torch was applied to him. It was a slow process, punctuated by screams and sobbing, and by the time he had confessed in the detail that the mob wanted, he was partially conscious held up by chains. Brush was piled around him. Someone came forward with a can of gasoline. Townes was drenched in it, as was the brush. The instant the match was applied a "great sheet of flame shot up and Townes died in it." –– Longview News Journal, April 14, 1937

Both men were dead by 1:00pm. Their bodies were left hanging, strapped to the trees, for "hours," and were not removed until that night. The coroner would later state, on Townes' death certificate, that he was "burned to a crisp."

The mob claimed that the Townes and McDaniels, under torture, implicated another black man in Windham's killing, "Shorty" Dorrah, who lived nearby. One account said, during the lynching, several white men went to his home, abducted him, and brought him back to the wooded area. However, another account stated that the mob had kidnapped Dorrah "on the way to the lynching."

Both accounts stated that Dorrah pled his innocence, but the mob severely beat and horsewhipped him:

"...the mob beat and kicked him [Dorrah] until he confessed that he had helped the others plan the murder, but had not taken part in it. After watching the others die, he was beaten some more, then told to get out of the state [and never return]." –– Longview News Journal, April 14, 1937

Later that night, Jackson Police Inspector, Audis E. Crawford, wrote to the F.B.I. stating that Townes' file had been "permanently disposed of."

== Aftermath ==
Sheriff Wright said that the mob was "unexpected," and that while he pleaded with the mob "to let the law take its course." Deputy Sheriff Hugh Curtis stated the lynching took place in a "quickly, quietly and orderly" fashion. The mob was also reported to be "highly organized" and was said to have executed the lynchings "in a jiffy." However, his statement was at odds at newspaper accounts of the lynching, in which it was called "a slow process." His statements, of how Townes and McDaniels were forcibly taken from the custody of him and his sheriffs, was also in conflict with Time Magazine's report, which stated that Townes and McDaniels were taken from the sheriff and his deputies "without a struggle."

Sheriff Wright, along with his deputies stated that, although the mob was unmasked, they did not recognize any of the participants. However District Attorney, Clarence Morgan contradicted their statements when he said that Sheriff Wright told him that the mob was "from some other county." Morgan, who stated that "the mob just came on us like an April shower," later said he was "confident none of the parties in the mob was from Montgomery County"...and specified that he had information that the mob came from the counties of "Grenada, Carroll, and probably from Webster and Tallahatchie."

Local newspaper The Greenwood Commonwealth pointed out that three of the four districts Morgan named were in his district and stated that Morgan had a duty to name any mob members if he knew them.

"There is always one thing about mobs that is queer. Despite the fact that the sheriff is well acquainted with the great majority of citizens in his county, a mob never contains anybody whom the sheriff ever saw before or is able to recognize afterwards." –– The Greenwood Commonwealth, April 26, 1937

Governor Hugh L. White initially issued an order to send the Mississippi National Guard from Grenada to the scene but rescinded the order once he deemed the lynching was already over.

Under national pressure, Governor White said he would "personally investigate" the lynchings, then called on District Attorney Morgan to make a formal investigation. However, the lynchings had widespread support around Mississippi, and the Governor's investigation call was treated as little more than a formality. For example, when praising the lynchings for saving the state money in court costs, The Enterprise-Tocsin editorial stated:

"We do not condone lynchings, but if two persons ever deserved lynching the two brutes at Duck Hill richly deserved what they got. We have no sympathy to waste on them, none whatsoever. Nothing will ever come from any investigation the Governor or anybody else will make, and no one member of the mob will ever be arrested. Even should some arrests be made there is not a jury in Mississippi that would ever convict any mob member. That is a fact and everyone knows it."

The Governor never requested Morgan to report his findings to him. However, he later delegated Sheriff Wright and his deputies to report their findings to him. But, Sheriff Wright said that due to the amount of court work that needed his attention, he was "not able to concentrate his efforts" on the lynching. Governor White did not state what he would do if the Sheriff refused or failed to investigate the lynchings.

Weeks before Townes and Roosevelt were killed, Mississippi led the nation in lynchings, accounting for over 525 of the 4,820 on record since 1882. However, moments before the lynching occurred, Governor White boasted, at a Farm Chemurgic Conference in Jackson, that there had not been a lynching in the state in 15 months. The day after the lynching, the governor later joked:

"Just as I made that statement, a big placard fell from the wall right at the speaker's stand. That must have been an omen of some kind. Right at the moment the negroes were being lynched."

No one was ever charged with the abductions or murders. The identities of Windham's neighbors, who were said to have heard the car, the shot, and Windham's groans, were never reported; nor was it reported how close these neighbors lived to the store given that they allegedly heard the car and Windham's moans. The lab results of the cash register's fingerprints, and bloody footprints, were never reported on beyond January 3. While Sheriff Wright twice stated his belief that the crime had been "committed by a person familiar entirely with Windham's store and habits," it was never reported that any family members of Windham's were ever questioned or considered as suspects, specifically George Windham's brother, Gus, given Sheriff Wright had given him access to black men who stood accused of the crime. It was also not elaborated why the suspect(s) was deemed to be black, or how any black person in the area, specifically Townes and McDaniels, would have been "familiar entirely with Windham's store and habits," or would have been aware that his family was away at the time. It was also not elaborated as to why Townes was suspected, when the white prisoner he was said to have escaped prison with, was not. It was not stated whether Windham's murder was connected with the other two recent murders in the area. Nor was a murder weapon ever found. Despite such discrepancies, after the lynching, it would be retroactively reported that Townes had been the prime suspect since the day after the murder.

=== Significance ===
On April 26, 1937, Time and Life magazines published a photograph of McDaniels' body chained to a tree. It was the first time an image of lynching had been published nationally. Other newspapers later published the image.

In 1955, the picture appeared in the popular Museum of Modern Art exhibition The Family of Man, an exhibition "to capture “the gamut of life from birth to death." The photo appeared under the title "Death Slump at Mississippi Lynching (1937)." It was estimated to have been seen by more than 180,000 visitors in New York, however after receiving criticism of the photo for being "too powerful, too striking and causing visitors to pause and gaze, thus interrupting the flow of the movement and the flow of the message," curator Edward Steichen withdrew the image eleven weeks after the show opened:

"[I] felt that this violent picture might become a focal point in the reception of The Family of Man...[It] provided a form of dissonance to the theme, so we removed it for that purpose."

There was condemnation expressed across the country against the lynchings.

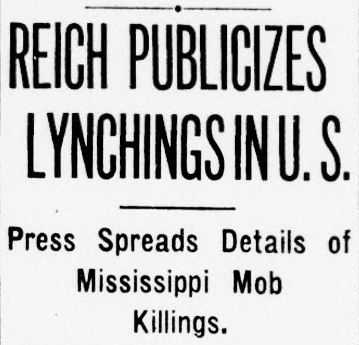
Nazis condemn lynchings

"The lynchers, of course, are the worse variety –– fiends for the hour committing mob murder with such maniacal brutality one wonders if they can be human.

It is a crime peculiar to the United States –– a crime that has kept the people of other lands debating over what sort of brute is ranging upon the American continent. We can accuse the Nazi's of persecution, of bigotry and intolerance if we wish...but the Nazis can curse us a 'lynchers' and we must take it and like it.

Lynching is ofttimes intolerance and hatred at its worse; there is nothing in foreign countries to approach it. What is more, the Congress of the United States –– the representatives of the people –– have defeated every attempt so far to wipe out the horror...and as their mad brethern in Mississippi were torturing these two citizens to death, the Congress was arguing whether there should be a law against it."

Internationally, German newspapers publicized the murders to support Nazi government propaganda, contrasting the violence of the lynchings to the "humane" Nuremberg racial laws that the Reich had passed against Jewish citizens.

The lynchings had also occurred at the moment that the House of Representatives was debating Rep. Joseph Gavagan's (D-New York) anti-lynching legislation. The outrage helped gain support for anti-lynching legislation that he introduced. The legislation was supported in the Senate by Democrats Robert F. Wagner (New York) and Frederick Van Nuys (Indiana). The legislation eventually passed in the House, despite 85 percent of the 123 Representatives from the South, voting against it. However, the emerging Southern Caucus of white Democrats blocked it in the Senate, as they had blocked all previous anti-lynching bills. Senator Allen Ellender (D-Louisiana) proclaimed:

"We shall at all cost preserve the white supremacy of America."

Senator William Borah spoke against the Anti-Lynching (Costigan–Wagner Bill) which was introduced in 1935 and 1938 just as he had spoken against passage of the Dyer Anti-Lynching Bill in 1922 and 1923 On March 29, 2022, President Joe Biden signed the Emmett Till Antilynching Act into law, making lynching a federal hate crime. The bill was named after Emmett Till, a 14-year-old African American boy who was lynched in Mississippi in 1955. Till's murder helped to spark the Civil Rights Movement.

== See also ==
- Extrajudicial punishment
- Hate crime
- Mass racial violence in the United States
- Racism in the United States
- Sundown town
- Warning out of town
- White supremacy in the United States
