= Oscar J. Smith =

American politician

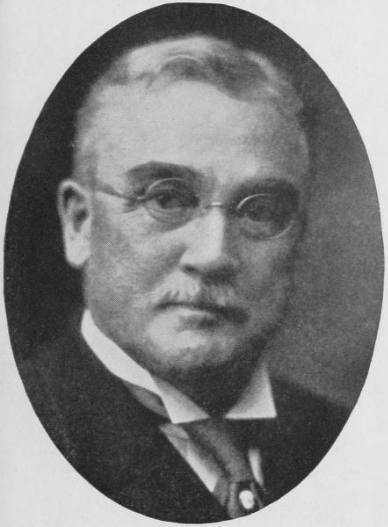

Member of the New York State Assembly
- In office 1920
- Constituency: New York County 22nd District

Personal details
- Born: Oscar James Smith; August 15, 1859 Burrillville, Rhode Island, US
- Died: February 18, 1937 (aged 77) New York, New York, US
- Party: Republican
- Spouses: Minnie D. Foley (m. 1896): Joanna Muller Gordon
- Education: Colorado State School of Mines
- Occupation: Lawyer, politician

Oscar James Smith (August 15, 1859 – February 18, 1937) was an American lawyer and politician.

== Life ==
Smith was born on August 15, 1859 in Burrillville, Rhode Island, the son of James Arnold Smith and Harriet Laraway. He attended the Leicester Academy in Leicester, Massachusetts from 1871 to 1876 and went to the Colorado State School of Mines.

In 1880, Smith moved to Colorado and spent three years working as a miner and as a cowboy on big ranges. He became connected with a smelter in 1884 and spent the next six years working his way up from roustabout to assayer to traveling ore buyer. In 1890, he began buying and selling ores for himself on the west coast of Mexico, first at Mazatlán and later in other places. He moved to Reno, Nevada in 1896. He was elected president of the Eureka County Bank in 1898, and a year later he became identified with his brother Bert L. Smith and a Mr. Griffin in the Eureka Live Stock Company. He came president of the First National Bank of Elko and the Southern Nevada Banking Company (later known as the First National Bank of Rhyolite), and in 1906 he was elected vice-president of the Bank of Manhattan.

Smith was admitted to the Nevada bar in 1897. He was a member of the law firm Cheney, Massey & Smith from 1902 to 1904, after which he practiced law on his own. He was Regent of the University of Nevada from 1905 to 1909. He was a delegate to the 1900 Republican National Convention and an alternate delegate to the 1908 Republican National Convention. In the 1906 United States House of Representatives election, he was the Republican candidate in Nevada's at-large congressional district. He lost the election to Democratic candidate George A. Bartlett.

Smith moved to New York City, New York in around 1913 and had law offices in 115 Broadway. In 1919, he was elected to the New York State Assembly as a Republican, representing the New York County 22nd District. He served in the Assembly in 1920. An active opponent of Prohibition, his election campaign was largely in defiance of the Anti-Saloon League, and while in the Assembly he sponsored a bill to empower the Attorney General of New York to arrange with Federal authorities for non-enforcement of the Eighteenth Amendment. He lost the 1920 re-election back to the Assembly to Michael E. Reiburn. In the 1924 United States House of Representatives election, he ran in New York's 21st congressional district (part of New York County) as an independent Wet candidate, losing to Democrat Royal H. Weller. In 1928, he unsuccessfully ran for the Assembly as a Republican in the New York County 22nd District, losing to Democratic incumbent Joseph A. Gavagan. He ran again in the 22nd District in 1930 and lost to Democratic incumbent Benjamin B. Mittler. In the 1932 United States House of Representatives election, he ran again in the 21st congressional district as a Republican, losing to Gavagan.

Smith was historian of the Empire State Society of the Sons of the American Revolution. A scholar on Abraham Lincoln, he obtained a number of first-hand stories from Lincoln's former law partner Ward H. Lamon. He was a member of the New York County Lawyers' Association, the New York County Republican Committee, the Bohemian Club of San Francisco, the Alta Club of Salt Lake City and the Elks. In 1896, he married Minnie D. Foley. By the time he died, he was married to Joanna Muller Gordon.

Smith died from pneumonia at Knickerbocker Hospital on February 18, 1937.

New York State Assembly
Preceded by Earl A. Smith	New York State Assembly; New York County, 22nd District; 1920	Succeeded by Michael E. Reiburn
