= Civil Rights Act of 1957 =

American civil rights law

- Long title: An Act to provide means of further securing and protecting the civil rights of persons within the jurisdiction of the United States.
- Enacted by: the 85th United States Congress
- Effective: September 9, 1957

Citations
- Public law: 85-315
- Statutes at Large: 71 Stat. 634

Legislative history
- Introduced in the House as H.R. 6127 by Herbert Brownell Jr.; Committee consideration by Judiciary; Passed the House on June 18, 1957 (286–126); Passed the Senate on August 7, 1957 (72–18) with amendment; House agreed to Senate amendment on August 27, 1957 (279–97) with further amendment; Senate agreed to House amendment on August 29, 1957 (60–15); Signed into law by President Dwight D. Eisenhower on September 9, 1957

Major amendments
- Civil Rights Act of 1960

The Civil Rights Act of 1957 was the first federal civil rights law passed by the United States Congress since the Civil Rights Act of 1875. The bill was passed by the 85th United States Congress and signed into law by President Dwight D. Eisenhower on September 9, 1957.

The Supreme Court's 1954 ruling in the case of Brown v. Board of Education brought the issue of school desegregation to the forefront of public attention, as Southern Democratic leaders began a campaign of "massive resistance" against desegregation. In the midst of this campaign, President Eisenhower proposed the bill to provide federal protection for African American voting rights; most African Americans in the Southern United States had been disenfranchised by state and local laws. Though the bill passed Congress, opponents of the act were able, in the Senate, to remove stringent voting protection clauses via the Anderson–Aiken amendment and the O'Mahoney jury trial amendment, significantly watering down its immediate impact. During the debate over the law, Senator Strom Thurmond conducted the longest one-person filibuster in Senate history at the time. Under the direction of Senate Majority Leader Lyndon B. Johnson of Texas, the Senate passed the watered-down version of the House bill.

Despite having a limited impact on African American voter participation, the Civil Rights Act of 1957 did establish the United States Commission on Civil Rights and the United States Department of Justice Civil Rights Division. Congress would later pass far more effective civil rights laws in the form of the Civil Rights Act of 1960, the Civil Rights Act of 1964, the Voting Rights Act of 1965, and the Civil Rights Act of 1968.

== Background ==
Following the Supreme Court ruling in Brown, which eventually led to the integration of public schools, Southern whites began a campaign of "Massive Resistance". Violence against black people rose; in Little Rock, Arkansas, President Dwight D. Eisenhower ordered U.S. paratroopers of the 101st Airborne Division to protect nine black teenagers integrating into a public school, the first time federal troops were deployed in the South to settle civil rights issues since the Reconstruction Era. There had been continued physical assaults against suspected activists and bombings of schools and churches in the South. Partly in an effort to defuse calls for more far-reaching reforms, President Eisenhower proposed the bill to increase the protection of African American voting rights.

By 1957, only about 20% of black people were registered to vote. Despite being the majority in numerous counties and congressional districts in the South, most black people had been effectively disfranchised by discriminatory voter registration rules and laws in those states since the post-Civil War Reconstruction era that were heavily instituted and propagated by Southern Democrats. Civil rights organizations had collected evidence of discriminatory practices, such as the administration of literacy and comprehension tests and poll taxes. While the states had the right to establish rules for voter registration and elections, the federal government found an oversight role in ensuring that citizens could exercise the constitutional right to vote for federal officers: electors for president and vice president and members of the US Congress.

== Legislative history ==
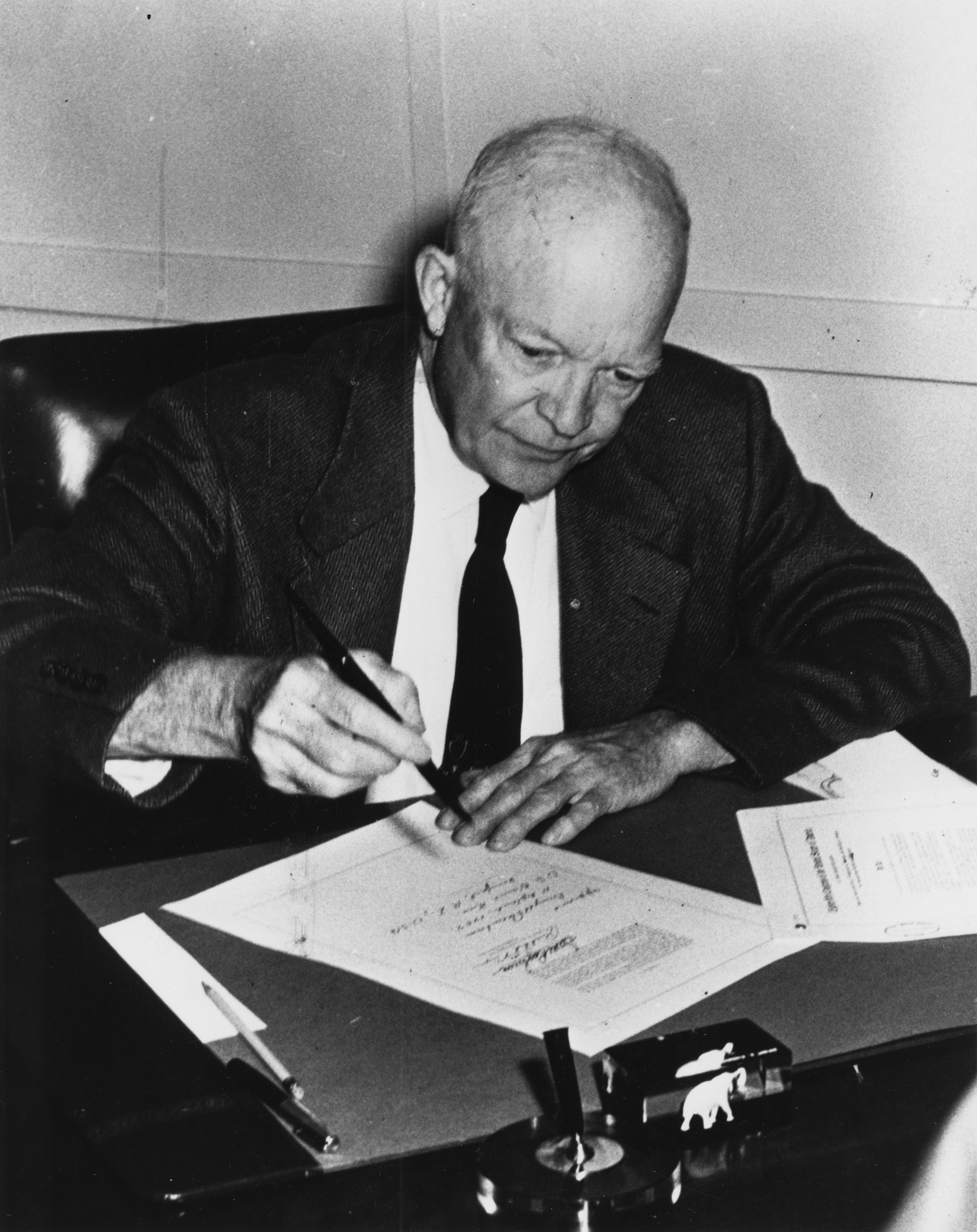
President Dwight D. Eisenhower signing the Civil Rights Act of 1957 on September 9, 1957

The Democratic Senate majority leader, Lyndon B. Johnson of Texas, who would play a vital role in the bill's passage in the Senate, realized that the bill and its journey through Congress could tear apart his party, as southern Democrats vehemently opposed civil rights, and its northern members were strongly in favor of them. Southern Democratic senators occupied chairs of numerous important committees because of their long seniority. As, in the near-century between the end of Reconstruction and the 1960s, white Southerners voted solidly as a bloc for the Democrats, Southern Democrats in Congress rarely lost their seats in elections, ensuring that they had more seniority than Democratic members of Congress from other parts of the country. Johnson sent the bill to the Senate Judiciary Committee, led by Democratic Senator James Eastland of Mississippi, who drastically altered the bill. Democratic Senator Richard Russell Jr., of Georgia had denounced the bill as an example of the federal government seeking to impose its laws on states. Johnson sought recognition from civil rights advocates for passing the bill as well as recognition from the anti-civil rights Democrats for weakening the bill so much as to make it toothless.

As well as a general support for civil rights as the party of Lincoln, Republicans saw that this could be an effective way to increase the number of Black Republican voters as the blocking of the Bill by the Democrats in the Southern Caucus would become obvious. They, like Johnson, also saw the potential for dividing the Democratic party's Northern and Southern wings. This meant that the (on this issue) liberal but hardball Republican operators like the Vice President, Richard Nixon, who had a constitutional right to chair the Senate took a great interest in the Bill. Conservative Republican Senators who were sympathetic to Southern arguments on States rights were more likely to vote on a party basis. On the other hand, the Republicans were willing to quietly allow Democratic Southern obstruction if this meant that African-American and liberal voters would be more likely to see the culprits as Democrats.

=== Anderson–Aiken amendment ===
A bipartisan group of Senators realized that Southerners would not allow passage of the act with Title III, which authorized the US Attorney General to seek preventive relief in civil rights cases. Majority Leader Johnson convinced Senator Clinton Anderson (D-NM) to introduce an amendment to strip out the enforcement provisions of Title III. Anderson's initial hesitancy to be associated with the anti-civil rights bloc was met with Johnson's urging to introduce the amendment along with a Republican colleague. Anderson approached George Aiken (R-VT), who agreed to co-sponsor the amendment.

A crucial cause of the weakening of support for Title III was a speech given by the unofficial leader of the Southern Caucus the Georgian Democrat, Richard Russell, who pointed out that Title III was not a new law but an amendment of Section 1985 of Title 42 of the United States Code. It seems that this had not been understood previously by either the opponents or the supporters of the Civil Rights Act, including Douglas or Brownell. In his speech Russell drew out the implications of this, including the invocation of Section 1993 of Title 42 of the United States Code, a Reconstruction era law which wasn't mentioned in the bill and which authorized the President to enforce judicial decisions – which would include Brown v Board. This specter of military involvement in domestic politics became a worry not just for moderate previous supporters of the bill such as Bourke Hickenlooper (R-IA) – who after Russell's speech referred to Title III as a "violation of the civil rights of the white race." – but also strong supporters such as Douglas. Later President Eisenhower in answer to a direct question on Russell's charges distanced himself from the "exact language" of Title III.

President Eisenhower did not express enthusiasm for the provisions in Title III. In a press conference, he referred to it as going "too far too fast in laws", and instead placed an emphasis on the voting rights provisions in Title IV. This diminished the already-waning support for the title among Republicans, many of whom opposed its expansion of federal power on conservative grounds in spite of their sympathy towards civil rights causes.

The Anderson–Aiken amendment passed by a 52–38 vote. The vote on the amendment did not split purely along partisan or ideological lines; it was opposed by conservative William Knowland (R-CA) and supported by liberal Frank Church (D-ID).

=== Jury trial amendment ===
Majority Leader Johnson, who was intent on passing an act of some sort and preferred passing a bill with weakened provisions over supporting a strongly protective one doomed to fail at the hands of a Southern filibuster, moved to effectively weaken the voting rights-related provisions in Title IV. Alleged violators of civil rights injunctions are normally entitled to jury trials, with the exception of civil contempt actions. A jury trial amendment that included the guarantee of jury trials in civil contempt actions would, in the South, result in perpetrators of voter suppression being acquitted by an all-white jury, thus ensuring no resulted accomplishment to enfranchise blacks.

The jury trial amendment was not introduced by a Southern Democrat, instead being spearheaded by Wyoming senator Joseph C. O'Mahoney. The motivation for Western liberal Democrats to spearhead the cause of weakening the Civil Rights Act of 1957 was attributed to their traditional populist disdain for the perceived disproportionate power wielded by judges to quell labor causes in the Western United States, thus contributing to a resonance with the expansion of jury trial rights, although Lyndon Johnson's biographer Robert Caro also claims that Johnson had facilitated a bargain that Western liberal Democrats would vote with the South in important votes on Civil Rights in return for Southern support for public involvement in the building of the Hells Canyon Dam.

There was also support from some unions, particularly the Railroad brotherhoods and the United Mine Workers of America who agreed that this would also stop injunctions in union cases. Their support was seen as a major reason why Senators in mining states such as West Virginia and midwestern Republican senators where the railroads were strong became less hostile to the amendment.

On August 2, 1957, the Senate passed the jury trial amendment with majority support from Democratic members, both Northern and Southern. Following the vote, many Republicans were visible in their bitterness, having failed in an opportunity to spearhead the cause of civil rights against a deceitful, partisan Democratic effort. According to Johnson biographer Robert A. Caro:

In the wake of the vote, emotions spilled over. Richard Nixon could not contain his frustration and rage. When, as he was leaving the Chamber, reporters asked his reaction, the Vice President said, "This is one of the saddest days in the history of the Senate. It was a vote against the right to vote." Clarence Mitchell went to [William Knowland]'s office to discuss what to do now, and could hardly believe what he saw there. "That big, strong, brusque Knowland actually broke down and cried," Mitchell was to recall.

Several conservative Republican senators who voted for the Anderson–Aiken amendment on small-government grounds opposed the jury trial amendment for its intent of weakening civil rights efforts. Idaho senator Henry Dworshak decried that it "practically scuttled any hope of getting an effective civil rights bill."

=== Filibuster ===
Then-Democratic Senator Strom Thurmond of South Carolina, an ardent segregationist, sustained the longest one-person filibuster in history in an attempt to keep the bill from becoming law. His one-man filibuster lasted 24 hours and 18 minutes; he began with readings of every US state's election laws in alphabetical order. He later read from the Declaration of Independence, the Bill of Rights, and George Washington's Farewell Address.

To prevent a quorum call that could have relieved the filibuster by allowing the Senate to adjourn, cots were brought in from a nearby hotel for the legislators to sleep on while Thurmond discussed increasingly irrelevant and obscure topics. Other members of the Southern caucus, who had agreed as part of a compromise not to filibuster this bill, were upset with Thurmond. They believed his defiance made them look incompetent to their constituents. Other constituents were upset with their senators because they were seen as not helping Thurmond.

Thurmond pointed out that there was already a federal statute that prosecuted citizens who denied or intimidated voters at voting booths under a fine and/or imprisonment but that the bill then under consideration could legally deny trial by jury to those that continued to do so.

Democratic Representative Charles A. Boyle of Illinois, a member of the powerful Appropriations Subcommittee of Defense, pushed the bill through the House of Representatives.

=== Final passage ===
The bill passed 285–126 in the House of Representatives with a majority of both parties' support (Republicans 167–19, Democrats 118–107). It then passed 72–18 in the Senate, again with a majority of both parties (Republicans 43–0, Democrats 29–18). Despite large opposition from Southern Democrats, the Democratic U.S. Senators from Tennessee and Texas would support the law. President Eisenhower signed the bill on September 9, 1957.

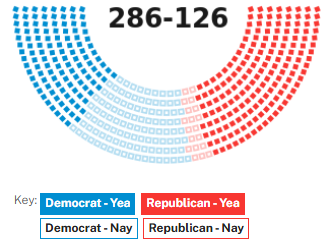
The vote breakdown in the US House by party of The Civil Rights Act of 1957.

The act established both the Commission on Civil Rights and the office of Assistant Attorney General for Civil Rights. Subsequently, on December 9, 1957, the Civil Rights Division was established within the Justice Department by order of US Attorney General William P. Rogers, giving the Assistant Attorney General for Civil Rights a distinct division to command. Previously, civil rights lawyers had enforced Reconstruction-era civil rights laws from within the Department's Criminal Division.

== Legislative breakdown ==
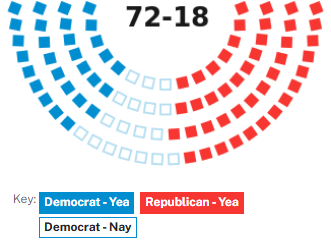
The vote breakdown in the US Senate by party of The Civil Rights Act of 1957.

H.R. 6127 was brought to a floor vote in the chamber of the US House on June 18, 1957. The Republican Party voted 167 in favor, 19 against. The Democratic Party voted 119 in favor, 107 against. 9 members voted present, and 13 members did not vote.

It was brought to a floor vote in the US Senate on August 7, 1957. The Republican Party voted 43 in favor, 0 against. The Democratic Party voted 29 in favor, 18 against.

== Parts ==
=== Part I – Establishment of the Commission on Civil Rights ===
Part I, consisting of sections 101–106, establishes a six-member Civil Rights Commission in the executive branch to gather information on citizens' deprivation of voting rights based on color, race, religion, or national origin; in addition the legal background, the laws, and the policies of the federal government relating to voting rights. It delineates the procedures, powers, and responsibilities of the commission. The commission was to take testimony or written complaints from individuals on the difficulties in voting registration and denial of voting rights. Required of the commission were periodic reports to congress and the president, as well as a final report within two years, after which it would be disbanded.

=== Part II – To Provide for an Additional Assistant Attorney General ===
Part II, Section 111 establishes one additional Assistant Attorney General to be appointed by the president and confirmed by the senate.

=== Part III – To Strengthen the Civil Rights Statutes, and for Other Purposes ===
Part III, Section 121 amends title 28, section 1343 of the United States Code to include language about civil rights. Section 122 repeals Section 1989 of 42 U.S.C. 1993.

=== Part IV – To Provide Means of Further Securing and Protecting the Right to Vote ===
Part IV, Section 131 banned intimidating, coercing or otherwise interfering with the rights of persons to vote for electors for president and members of Congress. The United States attorney general was allowed to institute actions, including injunctions and charges of contempt of court, with fines not to exceed $1,000 and six months imprisonment. Extensive safeguards for the rights of accused were provided by the statute. United States federal judges were allowed to hear cases related to the Act with or without juries.

Not being able to vote in most of the South, blacks were then excluded from state juries there. Federal jury selection had been tied to state jury selection rules, thus in some instances excluding both blacks and women as federal jurors. Section 161 freed federal courts from state jury rules and specified qualifications for jurors in federal courts. "Any citizen" 21 years or older, literate in English, who had resided in the judicial district for a year, excluding convicts and persons with mental or physical infirmities severe enough to make them unable to serve, was eligible. Since neither race nor sex was listed among the qualifications, the provision allowed both blacks and women to serve on juries in trials in federal courts.

=== Part V – To Provide Trial by Jury for Proceedings To Punish Criminal Contempts of Court Growing Out of Civil Rights Cases and To Amend the Judicial Code Relating to Federal Jury Qualifications ===
Part V consists of sections 151, 152, and 161. Section 151 describes the punitive measures to be taken when a person is found to be in contempt of the committee. Section 152 established federal qualifications for exclusion from a jury, those being: conviction of a crime with in State or Federal court with incarceration over 1 year; inability to read, write, speak, or understand the English language; or incapable through mental or physical disability. Section 161 establishes that the legislation may be cited as the "Civil Rights Act of 1957".

The act established both the Commission on Civil Rights and the office of Assistant Attorney General for Civil Rights. Subsequently, on December 9, 1957, the Civil Rights Division was established within the Justice Department by order of US Attorney General William P. Rogers, giving the Assistant Attorney General for Civil Rights a distinct division to command. Previously, civil rights lawyers had enforced Reconstruction-era civil rights laws from within the Department's Criminal Division.

== Future acts ==
The Civil Rights Act of 1960 addressed some of the shortcomings of the 1957 Act by expanding the authority of federal judges to protect voting rights and by requiring local authorities to maintain comprehensive voting records so that the government could determine if there were patterns of discrimination against certain populations.

The Civil Rights Movement continued to expand, with protesters leading nonviolent demonstrations for their cause. President John F. Kennedy called for a new bill in his televised Civil Rights Address of June 11, 1963, asking for legislation "giving all Americans the right to be served in facilities which are open to the public—hotels, restaurants, theaters, retail stores, and similar establishments" as well as "greater protection for the right to vote". Kennedy delivered the speech after a series of civil rights protests like the Birmingham campaign, which concluded in May 1963.

In the summer of 1963, parts of the civil rights movement collaborated on voter education and voter registration drives in Mississippi. During the 1964 Freedom Summer, hundreds of students from the North and West participated in voter drives and community organizing. Media coverage, especially of the violent backlash over the murders of Chaney, Goodman, and Schwerner near Philadelphia, Mississippi, contributed to national support for civil rights legislation.

After the Kennedy assassination, President Lyndon Johnson helped secure passage of the Civil Rights Act of 1964, which made racial discrimination and segregation illegal, as well as the Voting Rights Act of 1965 and 24th amendment, which abolished poll taxes and other means of keeping blacks and the poor from registering to vote or from voting, established record-keeping and oversight, and provided for federal enforcement in areas with documented patterns of discrimination or low voter turnout.

== Legacy ==
Although the Act's passage seemed to indicate a growing federal commitment to the cause of civil rights, its effect was limited. Alterations to the bill made the Act difficult to enforce; by 1960, black voting had increased by only 3%. Its passage showed varying degrees of willingness to support civil rights. The Act restricted itself to protecting participation in federal elections.

Martin Luther King Jr., then 28, was a developing leader in the Civil Rights Movement and spoke out against white supremacists. Segregationists had burned black churches, which were centers of education and organizing for voter registration, and physically attacked black activists. King sent a telegram to Eisenhower to make a speech to the South and asked him to use "the weight of your great office to point out to the people of the South the moral nature of the problem". Eisenhower responded, "I don't know what another speech would do about the thing right now."

Disappointed, King sent another telegram to Eisenhower stating that the president's comments were "a profound disappointment to the millions of Americans of goodwill, north and south, who earnestly are looking to you for leadership and guidance in this period of inevitable social change". He tried to set up a meeting with the president but was given a two-hour meeting with Vice President Richard Nixon. It was reported that Nixon was impressed with King and told Eisenhower that he might enjoy meeting King later.

== Bibliography ==
- Caro, Robert A. (2002). The Years of Lyndon Johnson: Master of the Senate. New York: Knopf. ISBN 0-394-52836-0.
- Finley, Keith M. (2008). Delaying the Dream: Southern Senators and the Fight Against Civil Rights, 1938–1965. Baton Rouge: LSU Press. ISBN 978-0807134610. OCLC 791398684.
- Pach, Chester J.; Richardson, Elmo (1991). The Presidency of Dwight D. Eisenhower (Revised ed.). University Press of Kansas. ISBN 978-0-7006-0437-1.
- Lane, Dorsey (1958). "The Civil Rights Act of 1957". Howard Law Journal. 4 (1): 36–49.
