= Strom Thurmond filibuster of the Civil Rights Act of 1957 =

Longest solo Senate speech intended to stall legislation

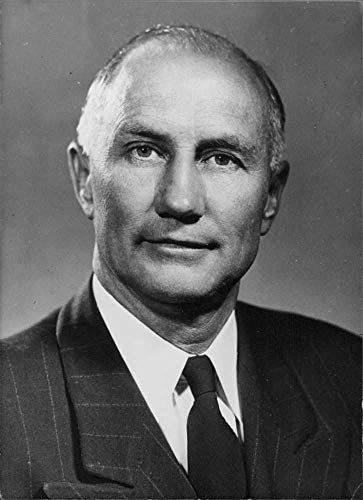
- Strom Thurmond, c. 1948
- Date: August 28–29, 1957
- Duration: 24 hours, 18 minutes
- Venue: United States Senate
- Type: Filibuster
- Motive: Prevention of the passage of the Civil Rights Act of 1957
- The full text of the filibuster at Wikisource

On August 28, 1957, Strom Thurmond, a United States senator from South Carolina, began a filibuster intended to prevent the passage of the Civil Rights Act of 1957. The filibuster—an extended speech designed to stall legislation—began at 8:54 p.m. (Note: All dates and times in this article are given in Eastern time.) and lasted until 9:12 p.m. the following day, a duration of 24 hours and 18 minutes. This makes the filibuster the longest single-person filibuster in United States Senate history as of 2026. It was also the longest single-person Senate speech until 2025, when the record was broken by Cory Booker of New Jersey, with Booker speaking for 25 hours and 5 minutes.

Thurmond's filibuster focused primarily on asserting that the bill in question, which provided for expanded federal protection of African American voting rights, was both unnecessary and unconstitutional, and Thurmond recited from documents including the election laws of each U.S. state, Supreme Court decisions, and George Washington's Farewell Address. Thurmond focused on a particular provision in the bill that dealt with certain court cases, but opposed the entirety of the bill. The bill passed two hours after the filibuster and was signed into law by President Dwight D. Eisenhower within two weeks.

Thurmond, an ardent segregationist, had served in the Senate for only three years before the speech, but was politically well-known even before his election to the body. Although the filibuster was supported by many South Carolinians and citizens of other Southern states, Thurmond's decision to filibuster the bill went against a previous agreement among Southern senators. As a result, Thurmond received mixed praise and criticism for his speech. Thurmond's filibuster was intended to delay access to voting for Black Americans.

== Background and goals ==
The Fifteenth Amendment had guaranteed citizens of all races the right to vote in 1870, but state laws, poll taxes, and other institutions still prevented many Black Americans from voting. The Civil Rights Act of 1957 was designed to federally secure and protect the right of Black Americans to vote, and was supported by the NAACP alongside the Dwight D. Eisenhower administration. The Act aimed to protect this right by establishing a Civil Rights Division within the Department of Justice and a U.S. Civil Rights Commission. In the Senate, many Democrats from Southern states were angered by the bill. The original bill had passed in the House of Representatives in June, but when the bill was sent to the Senate it was significantly watered down by a compromise to satisfy the Democrats. The Senate compromise removed a provision that would have allowed the Attorney General to file suit for discrimination in public places and added an amendment that guaranteed a trial by jury for anyone charged with restricting an individual's right to vote. This modified version of the bill passed the House on August 27 by a vote of 279–97.

Strom Thurmond, a United States senator from South Carolina, remarked that the civil rights bill constituted a "cruel and unusual punishment", and stated that he hoped to "educate the country" by means of an extended speech against the legislation. Senate rules allow for virtually unlimited debate on a bill, and a filibuster is a means of using these rules to prevent a bill's passage by speaking for as long as possible. At the time of Thurmond's filibuster, leaving the chamber or sitting down while speaking would end a senator's speech. A filibuster can also be ended by a cloture vote, which requires a certain percentage of senators to agree that a speech should be ended. At the time of Thurmond's speech, the threshold for cloture was a two-thirds majority. Thurmond holds the record for the longest solo filibuster, but longer filibusters have been carried out by groups of senators. He held the record for the longest solo speech until 2025, after Cory Booker gave a speech protesting the second presidency of Donald Trump lasting twenty-five hours and four minutes.

Thurmond's filibuster was primarily focused on a specific provision in the civil rights bill that focused on minor voting rights contempt cases. The provision allowed these cases to be tried by a judge without a jury present, but allowed a second trial by jury if penalties in the first trial exceeded 45 days' imprisonment or $300 in fines. This arrangement had been decided through a compromise between Republicans and Democrats, though according to historian Joseph Crespino it had very little practical impact since many judges would not hear a case without a jury if doing so made a second trial more likely. Thurmond and other Southern senators saw the provision as a violation of the defendant's right to a trial by jury, which is guaranteed by the U.S. Constitution.

Thurmond had been significantly involved in politics before his senatorship: he had served as Governor of South Carolina, helped to found the States' Rights Democratic Party after a walkout over civil rights at the 1948 Democratic National Convention, and ran against Harry S. Truman and Thomas E. Dewey as the new party's candidate in the 1948 presidential election. Thurmond garnered more than one million votes and won four states in this third-party presidential bid as a Dixiecrat. Six years later, Thurmond ran as a Democrat and was elected to the Senate as the junior senator from South Carolina in a write-in campaign. Thurmond's political candidacies were largely based on his opposition to racial integration.

Thurmond had earlier argued that the Southern senators should personally meet with Eisenhower to threaten him with an organized filibuster that would hold up other legislation, a tactic used successfully in the past to defeat other bills. But other senators thought that this could be counterproductive and that the tactic should be held in reserve.

An agreement within the Southern Caucus to not stage an organized filibuster had been reached in Senator Richard Russell's office on August 24, four days before Thurmond's speech. Thurmond's departure from the senators' agreement was later criticized by party leaders including Russell and Herman Talmadge.

== Filibuster ==
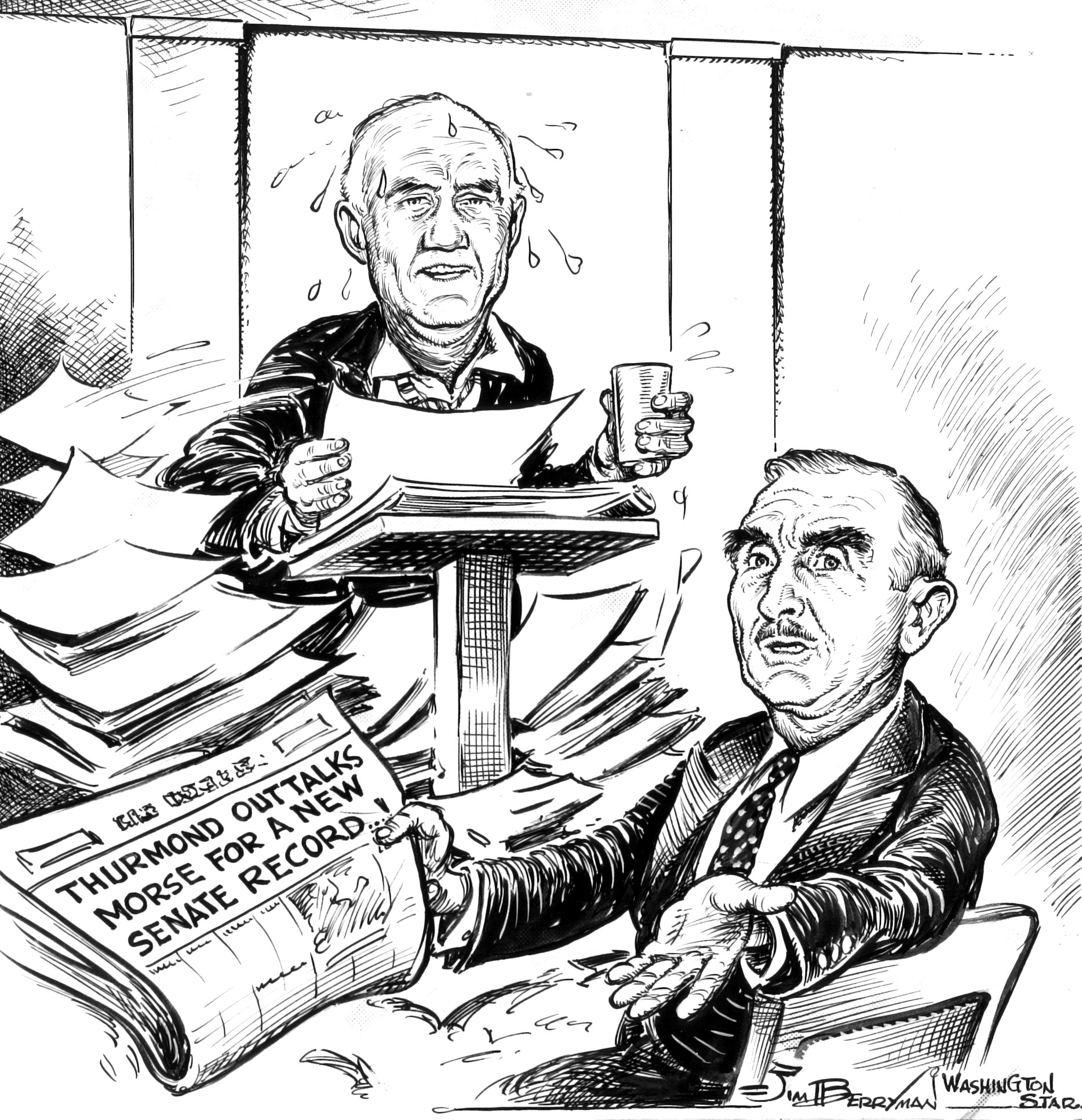
Cartoon by James T. Berryman showing Wayne Morse's shock at Thurmond surpassing his record

The filibuster began at 8:54 p.m. on August 28, 1957, with a reading of the election laws of each of the 48 states, (Note: Alaska and Hawaii were not yet admitted as states at the time of the filibuster.) and continued with readings from U.S. Supreme Court rulings, Democracy in America by Alexis de Tocqueville, and George Washington's Farewell Address. The Senate chamber gallery, filled with hundreds of spectators at the beginning of the filibuster, dwindled to just NAACP lobbyist Clarence Mitchell Jr. and Thurmond's wife Jean at points during the early morning hours. On the morning of the 29th, Thurmond's voice dropped to a mumble and his tone became increasingly monotonous. Republican leader William Knowland from California requested around midday that Thurmond speak up so he could be sure no motions were being made, but Thurmond responded by suggesting that the senator move closer. Knowland remained where he was. At approximately 1 p.m., Thurmond yielded to allow for the swearing-in of William Proxmire, who had been elected following the death of Joseph McCarthy, after which he resumed his speech. Thurmond was also allowed breaks throughout the day by other senators, including some in support of the bill, when they questioned him at length.

Thurmond concluded his filibuster after 24 hours and 18 minutes at 9:12 p.m. on August 29, making it the longest single-person filibuster ever conducted in the Senate as of 2025. This surpassed the previous record set by Wayne Morse, who spoke against the Submerged Lands Act for 22 hours and 26 minutes in 1953. It was also the longest speech conducted in the Senate until 2025, when Cory Booker gave a speech protesting the second presidency of Donald Trump. Teams of Congressional stenographers worked together to record the speech for the Congressional Record, which ultimately consumed 96 pages in the Record and cost over $7,000 in printing costs ($80,000 in 2025 dollars).

=== Logistics ===
Thurmond's filibuster has been described by historian and biographer Joseph Crespino as "kind of a urological mystery". Thurmond took regular steam baths leading up to the filibuster to draw fluids out of his body, thus dehydrating himself and allowing himself to absorb fluids for a longer period of time during the filibuster. It has also been rumored within the African American community that Thurmond used other methods to avoid leaving for the restroom. The Chicago Defender stated that Thurmond had worn "a contraption devised for long motoring trips" that allowed him to relieve himself on the stand, and longtime Capitol Hill staffer Bertie Bowman claimed in his memoir that Thurmond had been fitted with a catheter. Thurmond was allowed to leave for the restroom one time, approximately three hours into the filibuster. Senator Barry Goldwater quietly asked Thurmond how much longer he could hold off using the restroom, to which he replied, "about another hour". Goldwater asked Thurmond to yield the floor to him for a few minutes, and Thurmond was able to use the restroom while Goldwater made an insertion to the Congressional Record. An aide had prepared a bucket in the Senate cloakroom for Thurmond to relieve himself if the need arose, but Thurmond did not end up using it. Thurmond's health had become an item of concern by the evening of the 29th among his aides and the Senate physician George W. Calver, who threatened to personally remove him from the floor if senatorial staff could not convince Thurmond to end his speech.

During the filibuster, Thurmond sustained himself on diced pieces of pumpernickel bread and small pieces of ground steak. He also brought throat lozenges and malted milk tablets onto the floor with him in his pockets. Senator Paul Douglas of Illinois brought Thurmond a pitcher of orange juice as noon approached on the 29th, but a staffer quickly put it out of his reach after Thurmond had drunk a glass to reduce the likelihood of him needing to leave for a restroom.

== Outcome and reception ==
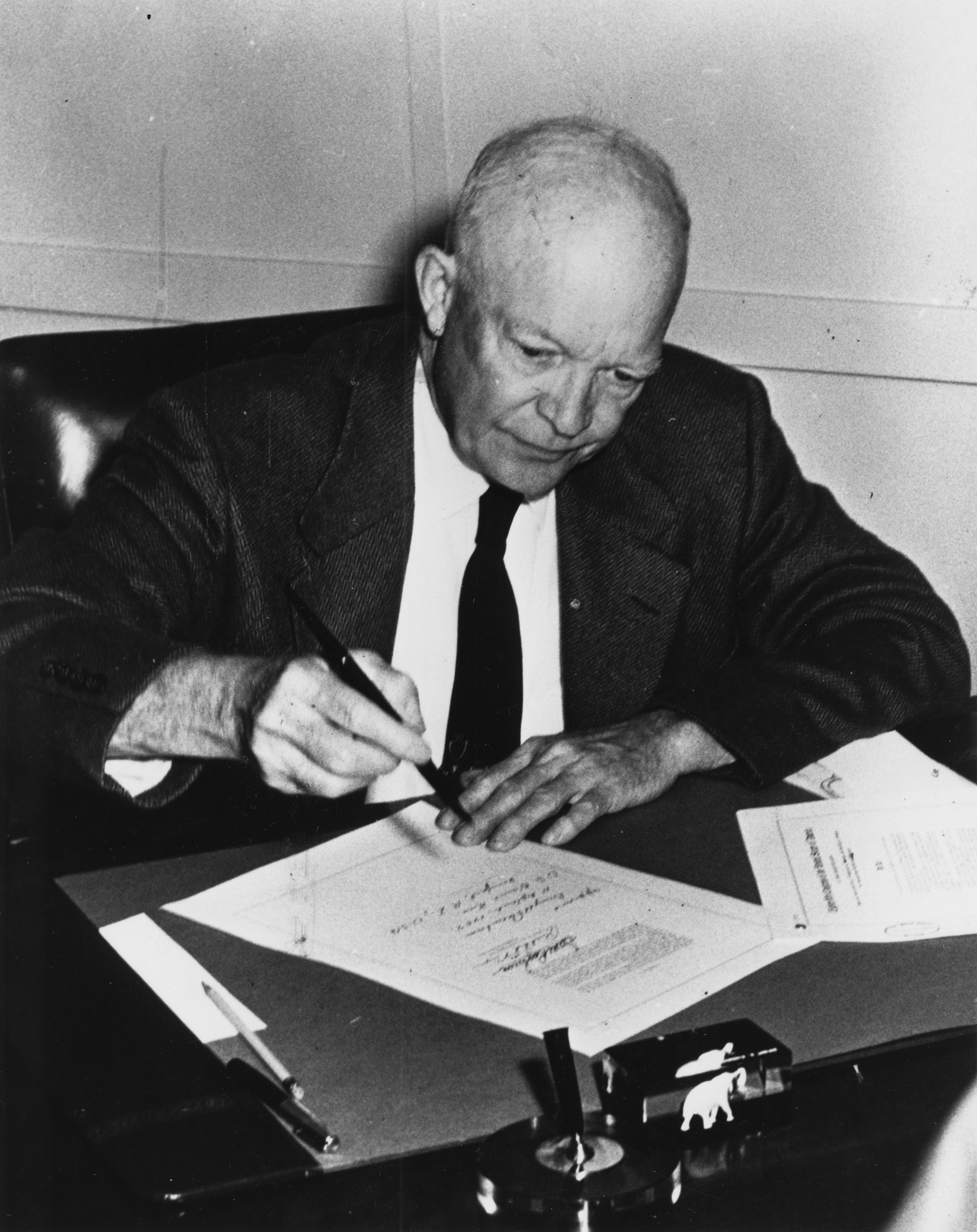
President Dwight D. Eisenhower signs the Civil Rights Act of 1957 into law on September 9, 1957

The filibuster failed to prevent the passage of the bill, and further failed to change the vote whatsoever. The bill passed two hours after Thurmond finished speaking by a vote of 60–15, and was signed into law by President Eisenhower less than two weeks later. The Civil Rights Act of 1957 was the first U.S. civil rights bill passed in 82 years.

Thurmond received significant criticism, even from Democrats who signed or were aligned with the goals of the Southern Manifesto, including Talmadge, Russell, and the Dixiecrats as a whole. Talmadge referred to the speech as a form of grandstanding, and Russell denounced it as "personal political aggrandizement". These senators had received several telegrams during Thurmond's speech encouraging them to assist Thurmond in his filibuster by relieving him, and Thurmond's staff received correspondence from hundreds of Southerners congratulating and encouraging him. The Southern Caucus did not join the filibuster, despite its popularity among their constituents, because (as Russell put it) the South had already secured a compromise in the bill which would be jeopardized by a filibuster and there was not enough support to prevent a cloture vote anyway.

In 1964, Thurmond was involved in a second filibuster against the Civil Rights Act of 1964. Later that year, he switched his affiliation to the Republican Party. The 1964 filibuster was carried out by a group of Southern senators and was only ended by a cloture vote. Thurmond was repeatedly elected and served in the Senate for 48 years, retiring in 2003 at the age of 100 as the oldest U.S. senator ever.

=== Modern reception ===
The filibuster did not use any "overtly racist language"; however, according to Gillian Brockell, writing for The Washington Post, it is racist because Thurmond filibustered against a bill that protected the right of African Americans to vote. In his 2012 biography of Thurmond, Strom Thurmond's America, Crespino noted the impact of Thurmond's filibuster and partial authorship of the Southern Manifesto, a document written the previous year designed to unify the South against school integration. He described these events as "[sealing] Thurmond's reputation as one of the South's last Confederates, a champion of white southerners' campaign of 'massive resistance'" to civil rights. He further argues that the filibuster was a way for Thurmond to uphold Southern ideas about white strength and endurance, while also burnishing his personal image of masculinity and health.
