= James H. Torrens =

American politician (1874–1952)

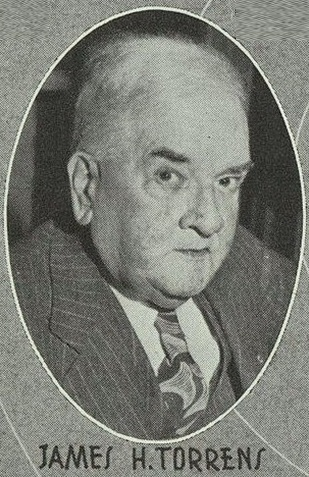

Member of the U.S. House of Representatives from New York's 21st district
- In office February 29, 1944 – January 3, 1947
- Preceded by: Joseph A. Gavagan
- Succeeded by: Jacob Javits

Personal details
- Born: September 12, 1874 New York City, U.S.
- Died: April 5, 1952 (aged 77) New York City, U.S.
- Resting place: Gate of Heaven Cemetery, Hawthorne, New York, U.S.
- Party: Democratic
- Spouse: Isabella Nevins
- Children: 3
- Profession: Politician

James H. Torrens (September 12, 1874 – April 5, 1952) was an American politician who was a U.S. representative from New York and a Tammany Hall political figure in the first half of the 20th century.

== Biography ==
Born in New York City on September 12, 1874, Torrens attended the city's public schools. Torrens was for many years the vice president and treasurer of the D. Emil Klein Company, cigar manufacturers. During the early 1930s, Torrens served as vice president and general director of the Washington Heights Chamber of Commerce.

Torrens was a member of the Tammany Hall organization and served as Democratic leader of New York's "old" 21st congressional district (today's 16th congressional district, incorporating Washington Heights and parts of Harlem and the Bronx) from 1933 to 1947. In a special election held on February 29, 1944, Torrens was elected to the Seventy-eighth Congress as the Democratic/American Labor Party Candidate, filling the vacancy caused by the resignation of Democrat Joseph A. Gavagan. (Torrens, who did not covet a congressional career, ran at the specific urging of President Franklin D. Roosevelt, who believed Torrens the strongest candidate to hold the seat for the Democratic Party.) Torrens was elected to a full term in November 1944 and served until the end of his term on January 3, 1947. He did not run for reelection in 1946.

Torrens died at St. Elizabeth's Hospital, New York City, on April 5, 1952. He is buried at Gate of Heaven Cemetery, not far from his friends Babe Ruth, James Cagney and James Farley. Torrens was succeeded in the House of Representatives by Jacob Javits.

U.S. House of Representatives
Preceded by Joseph A. Gavagan	Member of the U.S. House of Representatives from New York's 21st congressional district 1944–1947	Succeeded by Jacob K. Javits
