= Martin C. Ansorge =

American politician (1882–1967)

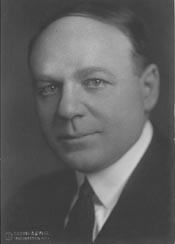

Member of the U.S. House of Representatives from New York's 21st district
- In office March 4, 1921 - March 3, 1923
- Preceded by: Jerome F. Donovan
- Succeeded by: Royal H. Weller

Personal details
- Born: Martin Charles Ansorge; January 1, 1882 Corning, New York
- Died: February 4, 1967 (aged 85) New York City, New York
- Party: Republican
- Education: Columbia University (BA, LLB)
- Profession: Attorney

Military service
- Allegiance: United States
- Branch/service: United States Army
- Rank: Private
- Unit: Motor Transport Corps
- Battles/wars: World War I

Martin Charles Ansorge (January 1, 1882 – February 4, 1967) was an American politician who was a United States representative from New York from 1921 to 1923.

== Biography ==
The son of Mark Perry Ansorge and Jennie Bach Ansorge, Martin Ansorge was born into a Jewish household in Corning, Steuben County, New York on January 1, 1882.

He attended the public schools and the College of the City of New York. He graduated from Columbia College of Columbia University in 1903, and Columbia Law School in 1906. He was admitted to the bar in 1906 and commenced practice in Manhattan, New York City.

== Start of political career ==
Ansorge was the unsuccessful Republican candidate for election to Congress in 1912, 1914, and 1916. In his bid for the 21st District Congressional Seat in 1916, Ansorge's campaign slogan was "Feed America First", advocating the necessity of an embargo upon shipment abroad of foodstuffs needed for the consumption of American people, taking a stand on international trade negotiations and import tariffs post World War I. He declined the Republican nomination for Congress in 1918.

== World War I ==
During the First World War Ansorge enlisted as a private in the United States Army. He was assigned to the Motor Transport Corps; Ansorge was stationed at Camp Meigs in what is now the Brentwood neighborhood of Washington, D.C., and intended to serve in France. The armistice took place before he left the country, and he was honorably discharged at the end of the war.

== Continued political career ==
He was the first chairman of the Triborough Bridge Committee, a position he held from 1918 to 1921.

Ansorge was elected as a Republican to the 67th United States Congress (March 4, 1921 – March 3, 1923). He lost reelection to the 68th United States Congress in 1922 by the margin of 345 votes, and unsuccessfully contested the victory of Royal H. Weller. In the contest proceedings, he won dismissal of an injunction prevent the opening of the ballot boxes; the subsequent recount reduced Weller's margin of victory, but Weller still won the seat by 10 votes.

As a Congressman, Ansorge was influential in the attempted passage of the first-ever federal anti-lynching legislation. His work on the matter was eventually incorporated into the Dyer Anti-Lynching Bill, which would make lynching a federal crime. Shortly after an Ansorge speech in support of the bill, Columbia University President Nicholas Murray Butler wrote to Ansorge: "You are making a fine and highly patriotic record in the House, and your friends are proud of you". The bill passed the House, 230 to 119, but was filibustered in the Senate by Southern Democrats and never became law.

Having founded the Young Republicans at Columbia University, Ansorge was a protege, close friend, and political ally of Butler's. The two remained very close for years, and Ansorge was staff to Butler at the Republican Convention. Ansorge spoke on behalf of Butler at a number of political rallies in New York.

Ansorge was co-author of the original Port Authority Bill, which he shepherded successfully through Congress. He was an active leader in efforts to develop "the greatest port in the world" connecting New York and New Jersey. He presented the bill to President Warren Harding to sign into law. The pen stayed in the Ansorge family for some years until it was given to the City Museum of New York.

== Attempt to integrate the U.S. service academies ==
In 1922, Ansorge nominated the first African-American since 1874 to the U.S. Naval Academy. Although there had been three Black midshipmen at Annapolis in the 1870s, Emile Treville Holley was not accepted for enrollment because of racist attitudes at the time. As the New York Times reported, U.S. Navy officers and Annapolis midshipmen who "will not talk for publication on this matter" expressed the idea that "the fate that awaits the candidate is social ostracism" and that "it is safe to say that the midshipmen have condemned him to '"Conventry,', just as nearly fifty years ago the midshipmen of 1873, 1874 and 1875 refused to receive as equals three other negro boys..." Holley enrolled instead at Middlebury College in Vermont and then went on to become a college professor.

== Later career ==
Ansorge was an unsuccessful candidate for judge of the court of general sessions of New York City in 1924, and unsuccessful candidate for justice of the supreme court of New York in 1927 and in 1928.

The New York Times made mention of Ansorge as a candidate for Mayor of New York City in 1949.

Ansorge continued to practice law in New York City, was a member of the board of directors of United Air Lines from 1934 to 1961. He represented Henry Ford in the Aaron Sapiro libel lawsuit, which resulted in Ford's apologies and agreement to pay court costs.

== Death and burial ==
Ansorge died at his apartment in the Ansonia Hotel at 74th Street and Broadway in Manhattan, New York City on February 4, 1967. He was interred in Temple Israel Cemetery, Hastings-on-Hudson, New York.

== See also ==
- List of Jewish members of the United States Congress

U.S. House of Representatives
| Preceded by Jerome F. Donovan | Member of the U.S. House of Representatives from New York's 21st congressional district 1921 - 1923 | Succeeded by Royal H. Weller |
