= Southern Caucus =

Caucus of Southern Democrats in the United States Senate

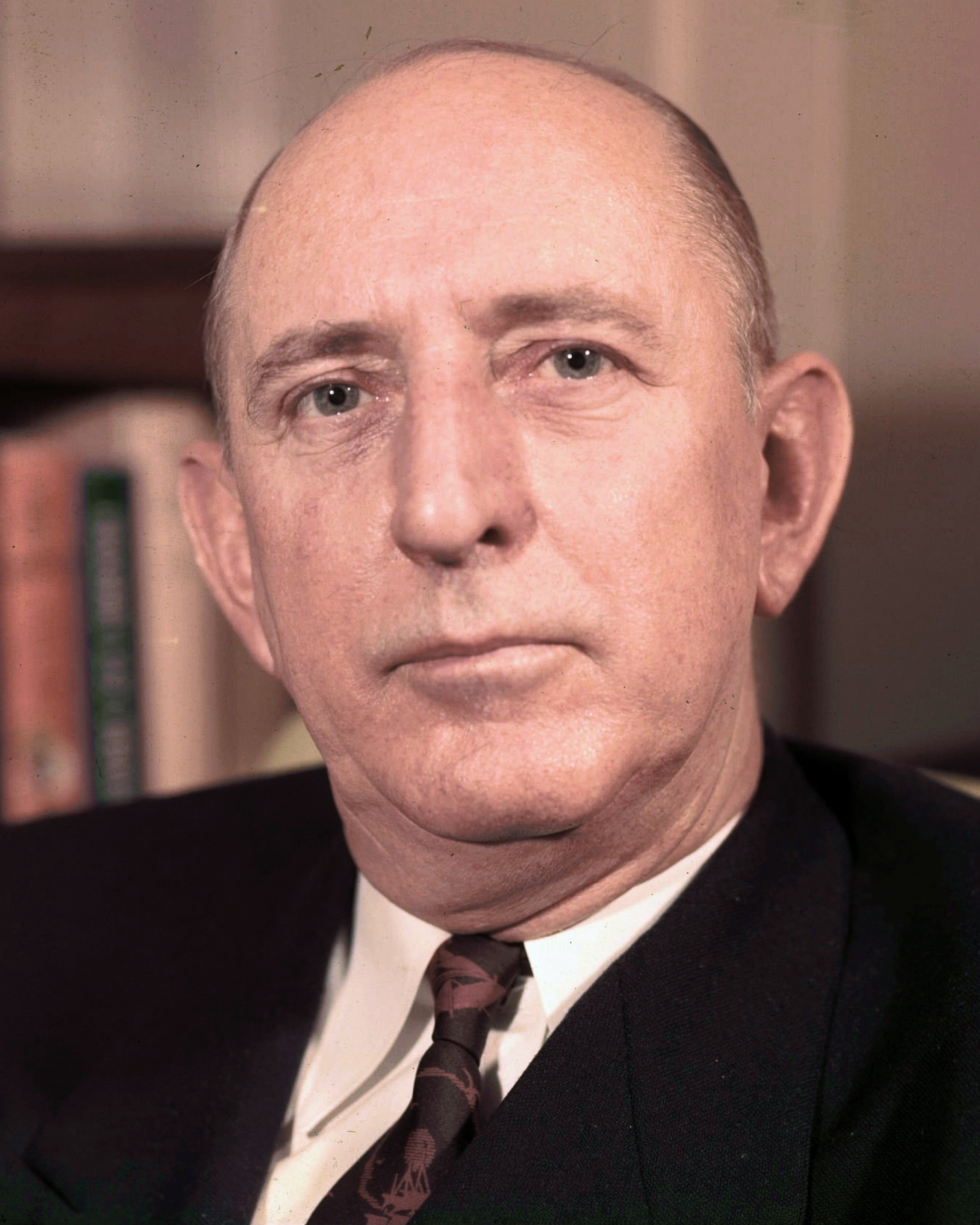
Richard Russell, chairman of the Southern Caucus

The Southern Caucus was a Congressional caucus of Southern Democrats in the United States Senate chaired by Richard Russell, which was an effective opposition to civil rights legislation and formed a vital part of the later conservative coalition that dominated the Senate into the 1960s.

The Caucus was still active in 1964 when they tried and failed to derail the 1964 Civil Rights Act.

== Role in civil rights legislation ==
The caucus was particularly interested in stopping federal legislation on civil rights. The tone of the Southern Caucus was to be more moderate and reasonable so as not to alienate potential allies and to eschew the explicit white supremacism of Senators such as Tom Connally.

== Emergence ==
The group first emerged as a more formal group in a successful filibuster that blocked the Anti-Lynching Bill of 1937. This had passed the House of Representatives and seemed to have majority support in the Senate. This was at the same time as other elements of President Franklin Roosevelt's legislative program were meeting legislative obstacles thanks to the growth of a loose conservative coalition within Congress of Republicans as well as various more conservative sections of the Democratic Party.

During and after the Second World War the Southern Caucus widened its tactics from pure obstruction through the filibuster to courting of Northern allies and a rearguard approach of allowing some bills through and amending others to an acceptable form.

== Power within the Senate ==
William White's book Citadel was credited as the first expose of the Southern Caucus's control over the senate, in which it described the caucus as "for all the world like the reunions of a large and highly individualistic family whose members are nevertheless bound by the one bond". The book argued that the caucus was quite wide-ranging in its views on economics or foreign policy, but that its protection of the filibuster and general devotion to States rights meant that they rejected the Tennessee Senator Estes Kefauver.

The root of the group's power lay in the one-party nature of the Solid South which meant that there was little turnover of Senators from the region, coupled with the seniority system within the Senate which meant that power would accrue to Senators with particularly long service. This was particularly the case when the Democrats controlled the Senate and therefore the Committee chairmanships.

The Senate's rules, which mean that in general Senators once recognized can speak for as long as they wish, meant that bills that had support from other branches of the government, and even from the majority of Senators, could be held up for a very long time by a determined minority – and, importantly, cause unacceptable delays in other business. This device, the filibuster, was used effectively by the Southern Caucus to deny a number of civil rights Bills passage into law.

== Leadership of Richard Russell ==
Through most of the caucus's life, the Georgia senator Richard Russell was the acknowledged leader of the group, with the group often meeting in his office and with him sending out invitations to what he called "Constitutional Democrats".

== Southern Manifesto ==
The caucus was where the Southern Manifesto was written, with Strom Thurmond writing the initial draft and Richard Russell the final version. This supported the reversal of the landmark Supreme Court 1954 ruling Brown v. Board of Education, which determined that segregation of public schools was unconstitutional and was signed by 19 Senators and 82 Representatives.

== Lyndon Johnson ==
The backing of the Southern Caucus was seen as crucial to Lyndon Johnson's early rise, although he did distance himself somewhat from the Caucus as Senate Majority Leader by not signing the Southern Manifesto, although his biographer Robert Caro argues that this was with the active connivance of the Caucus and Russell who wanted to improve Johnson's presidential chances as they saw him as fundamentally sympathetic to the Caucus's position on civil rights. In 1959, Johnson joined the Senate Democrats' Western regional conference.

The caucus's backing of Johnson for President is a reason given for the lack of an organized filibuster beyond Strom Thurmond's one-person filibuster of the Civil Rights Act of 1957, a tactic that the caucus had used adeptly in the past. Their support for Johnson also meant that they were more amenable with other liberal legislation that they would have blocked if a non-Southerner had been Majority Leader.

In later life, Johnson and a number of allies claimed that he had never been a member of the caucus, and when he attended meetings he would take pains to ensure that he was not publicly associated with it. However, Russell claimed that Johnson had attended all meetings until he became Democratic Senate Leader.
