= Michael E. Reiburn =

American politician

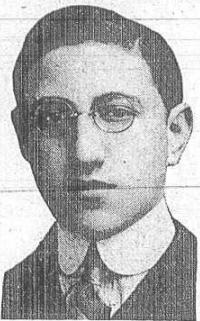
Michael E. Reiburn (1915)

Michael E. Reiburn (September 12, 1893 in New York City – June 1982 in New York City) was an American lawyer and Democratic politician from New York.

== Life ==
He was born as Michael E. Reitzenbein on September 12, 1893, in New York City. He graduated from Eastern District High School (Brooklyn) in 1911; and from Syracuse University College of Law in 1915. While in school, he won many debating prizes. Later he was President of the Sigma Alpha Mu fraternity. He began the practice of law in Syracuse, but later moved to Washington Heights, Manhattan. He practiced law in New York City, and changed his last name to Reiburn.

He was a member of the New York State Assembly (New York Co., 22nd D.) in 1921 and 1922. In 1921, the Citizens Union endorsed Reiburn for re-election, saying that he was "a member of promise and capacity with good record of votes."

He was a member of the New York State Senate (20th D.) from 1923 to 1926, sitting in the 146th, 147th, 148th and 149th New York State Legislatures; and was Chairman of the Committee on Labor and Industries from 1923 to 1924.

In 1927, he was accused of larceny, but the charges were dismissed.

In 1935, Reiburn was disbarred by the New York Supreme Court, Appellate Division for unethical practices. He was found guilty of "the conversion of money obtained from others by false representations of large profits to be made from the purchase of real property about to be acquired for public purposes."

In December 1937, he and three others were indicted by a federal grand jury for using the mails to swindle three widows out of about $10,000. A few days later, he was convicted of theft, and was sentenced by Judge Allen of the New York City Court of General Sessions to a term of eighteen months to three years in Sing Sing state prison.

In 1939, he was arrested for illegal bookmaking.

In 1941, he was convicted in federal court of fraud, and was sentenced to a five-year prison term.

He died in June 1982 in New York City.

== Notes ==
New York State Assembly
Preceded by Oscar J. Smith	New York State Assembly; New York County, 22nd District; 1921–1922	Succeeded by Joseph A. Gavagan
New York State Senate
Preceded by Ward V. Tolbert	New York State Senate; 20th District; 1923–1926	Succeeded by A. Spencer Feld
