= Joseph A. Gavagan =

American politician

Joseph Andrew Gavagan
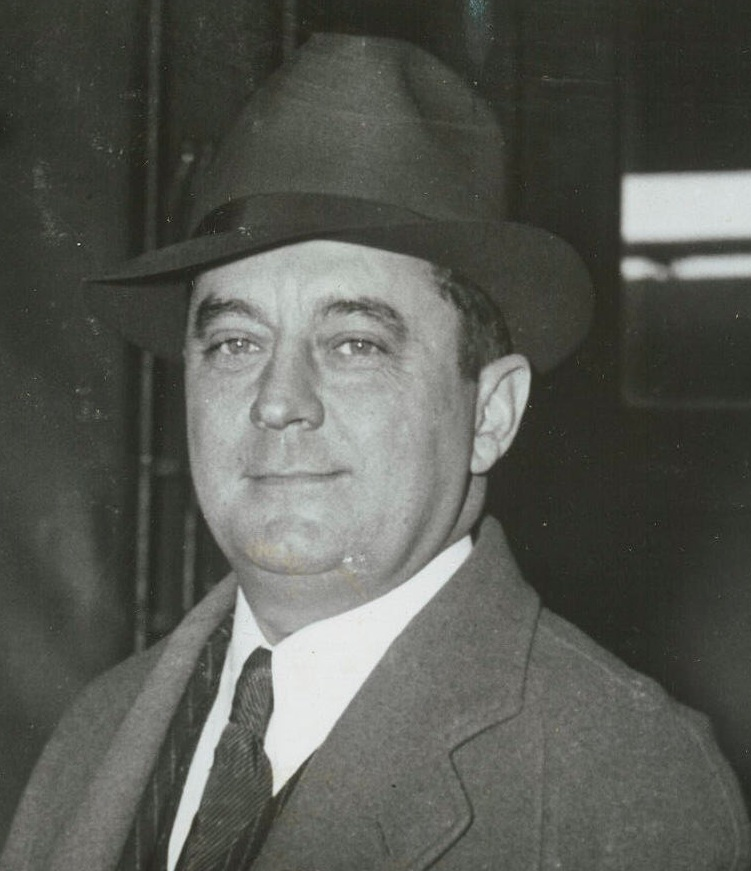
- Gavagan in 1939

Member of the U.S. House of Representatives from New York's 21st district
- In office November 5, 1929 – December 30, 1943
- Preceded by: Royal H. Weller
- Succeeded by: James H. Torrens

Member of the New York State Assembly from the New York County, 22nd district
- In office 1923–1929
- Preceded by: Michael E. Reiburn
- Succeeded by: Benjamin B. Mittler

Personal details
- Born: August 20, 1892 New York City, New York, U.S.
- Died: October 18, 1968 (aged 76) Putnam Memorial Hospital, Bennington, Vermont, U.S.
- Resting place: Gate of Heaven Cemetery
- Party: Democratic

Joseph Andrew Gavagan (August 20, 1892 – October 18, 1968) was an American politician, lawyer and World War I veteran who served seven terms as a United States representative from New York from 1929 to 1943.

== Early life ==
Born in New York City on August 20, 1892, he attended the public and parochial schools and graduated from the law department of Fordham University in 1920.

== World War I ==
During World War I, he enlisted as a private and later was promoted to second lieutenant in the Quartermaster Corps and served from August 20, 1917, to October 13, 1919. He served at: Fort Totten, New York; Camp Alfred Vail, New Jersey; and Camp Gordon Johnston, Florida. He was a first lieutenant in the Quartermaster Reserve Corps from 1920 to 1925.

== Political career ==
Gavagan was admitted to the bar in 1920, and practiced law in New York City. A Democrat, he was a member of the New York State Assembly (New York Co., 22nd D.) in 1923, 1924, 1925, 1926, 1927, 1928 and 1929.

== Congressman ==
Gavagan was elected to the 71st United States Congress to fill the vacancy caused by the death of Royal H. Weller; he was re-elected to the 72nd and to the six succeeding Congresses and held office from November 5, 1929, to December 30, 1943, when he resigned. While in the House of Representatives, he was chairman of the Committee on Elections No. 2 (Seventy-second through Seventy-sixth Congresses) and Committee on War Claims (Seventy-seventh and Seventy-eighth Congresses).

Gavagan tried for years to pass an anti-lynching law; having grown up in New York's Hell's Kitchen, he saw discrimination against the Irish, African Americans, and other ethnic and racial minorities. Gavagan's argument for equal and fair treatment was that lynching meant mob rule, and mob rule meant that the rule of law was not respected. In 1937 a bill passed the House of Representatives but was blocked in the Senate by Southern Senators.

== Later life ==
Gavagan resigned from Congress after winning an election as a justice of the New York Supreme Court; he was re-elected in 1957, and was scheduled to retire on December 31, 1968.

== Death and burial ==
He maintained a summer house in Manchester, Vermont, and died at Putnam Memorial Hospital in Bennington, Vermont on October 18, 1968. He was interred at Gate of Heaven Cemetery in Hawthorne, New York.

== Family ==
In November 1933, Gavagan married Dorothy Whitehead, who had been his secretary in his Washington Congressional office. They were the parents of a son, Joseph Jr., and a daughter, Joan, who was the wife of Thomas G. Gorman.

== Sources ==
=== Newspapers ===
- "Miss Gavagan Bride". Troy Record. Troy, NY. August 12, 1957. p. 12.
- "Funeral: Justice Joseph Gavagan". Bennington Banner. Bennington, VT. October 22, 1968. p. 3.

=== Internet ===
- "New York, Abstracts of World War I Military Service, 1917-1919 for Joseph A. Gavagan". Ancestry.com. Provo, UT: Ancestry.com, LLC.

New York State Assembly
Preceded by Michael E. Reiburn	New York State Assembly; New York County, 22nd District; 1923–1929	Succeeded by Ben Mittler
U.S. House of Representatives
Preceded by Royal H. Weller	Member of the U.S. House of Representatives from New York's 21st congressional district 1929–1943	Succeeded by James H. Torrens
