= Citadel (1957 book) =

Citadel: The Story of the United States Senate
- Author: William S. White
- Subject: Politics
- Published: 1957
- Publisher: Harper
- OCLC: 422279187

Citadel: The Story of the United States Senate is a nonfiction book about the United States Senate by journalist William S. White, published in 1957. White's book was the first to make public how skilled the Southern senators were at utilizing every procedural mechanism the chamber had to offer. It spent 11 weeks on The New York Times best seller list for nonfiction.

== Summary ==
Citadel describes the creation of the United States Senate, which he refers to as "the Institution", and exposes how it operates behind the scenes with its emphasis on tradition and hierarchy. White credits the Senate with maintaining the two-party system in the United States.

In contrast to the popular conception of 100 equal senators, White argues that there is a controlling elite within the Senate that he calls the "Inner Club", dominated by senators from the Southern United States.

Those who belong to it express, consciously or consciously, the deepest instincts and prejudices of the Senate type, a man for whom the Institution is a career in itself, a life in itself and an end in itself.

Senate committees at the time were powerful and committee chairs were extremely influential. (Note: The Legislative Reorganization Act of 1970 reformed the procedures and regulations of committees.) Citadel praises the stability and compromise promoted by southern Democrats, many of whom controlled important committees.

Citadel identifies flaws in the Senate, such as its failure to defend liberal values, abuses of power by individuals, and its arrogance toward the House of Representatives and the Executive branch. It also criticizes the Senate's use of investigating committees, saying that the practice usurps the power of grand juries established by the Fifth Amendment to the United States Constitution.

== Reception ==
Writing in The New York Times, Orville Prescott gave it a positive review, calling it a "brisk and brightly written book". Reviewer James G. Wharton notes that White "sees the senate as an American institution that resists change, and in resisting, preserves some of the more stalwart virtus of qualitative democracy." In The Virginian-Pilot, the reviewer concludes that Citadel is "a book that is a pleasure to read, quite apart from its deeper significance as a study of the Senate". The reviewer for the Clarion-Ledger wrote "The tradition-bound Senate stands as a symbol to our democratic way of life and the reader will be the gainer with a clearer understanding of the inner workings of the upper hose after a close examination of Citadel."

On the Senate floor, George Smathers said of the recently published book that it was "incisive in recognizing the supersedence of common good over partisanship". John F. Kennedy, a senator at the time, wrote in New Leader magazine that Citadel's "picture does not have the detachment of a photograph, it is so much the better for being a painting with the interpretation and flavoring that a talented and sensitive artist can bring to such work. Mr. White may not love all senators, but he loves the Senate, and this affection regard shines through his work."
