= Royal Hurlburt Weller =

American politician and attorney (1881–1929)

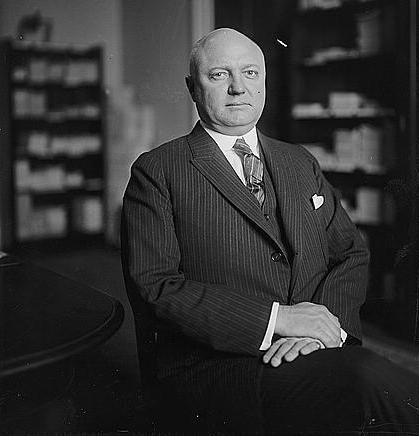

Member of the U.S. House of Representatives from New York's 21st district
- In office March 4, 1923 – March 1, 1929
- Preceded by: Martin C. Ansorge
- Succeeded by: Joseph A. Gavagan

Personal details
- Born: July 2, 1881 Manhattan, New York
- Died: March 1, 1929 (aged 47) Manhattan, New York
- Party: Democratic Party
- Profession: Politician, attorney

Royal Hurlburt Weller (July 2, 1881 – March 1, 1929) was an American politician and attorney who was a United States representative from New York from 1923 to 1929. He was assistant district attorney of New York County from 1911 to 1917.

== Early life and education ==
Weller was born in New York City on July 2, 1881. He attended the public schools and the College of the City of New York and graduated from the New York Law School in 1901.

== Career ==
He was admitted to the bar in 1902 and commenced practice in New York City. He was assistant district attorney of New York County from 1911 to 1917, when he resigned to reenter the practice of law. He was counsel for the Alien Property Custodian in 1918 and 1919.

Weller was elected as a Democrat to the Sixty-eighth, Sixty-ninth, and Seventieth Congresses and served from March 4, 1923, until his death. He had been reelected to the Seventy-first Congress. He died in New York City on March 1, 1929, and was interred in Woodlawn Cemetery.

The Library of Congress has cataloged a bill with which Weller was connected: A bill to establish a national conservatory of music for the education of pupils in music in all its branches. [Washington: Govt. Printing Office, 1927].

== See also ==
- List of members of the United States Congress who died in office (1900–1949)

U.S. House of Representatives
Preceded by Martin C. Ansorge	Member of the U.S. House of Representatives from New York's 21st congressional district 1923 - 1929	Succeeded by Joseph A. Gavagan
