= Anti-Lynching Bill of 1937 =

Proposed anti-lynching legislation

Legislative history
- Introduced in the House as H.R. 1507 by Joseph A. Gavagan (D–NY) and Robert F. Wagner (D–NY); Passed the House on April 15, 1937 (277–120)

The Anti-Lynching Bill of 1937, also known as the Gavagan-Wagner Act or the Wagner-Gavagan Act, was a proposed anti-lynching law which was sponsored by Democrats Joseph A. Gavagan and Robert F. Wagner, both of whom were from New York. It was introduced in response to the failure of the U.S. Senate to pass the 1934–35 Costigan-Wagner Act, although President Roosevelt was more prepared to support the 1937 Bill.

In 1937, the lynching of Roosevelt Townes and Robert McDaniels gained national publicity, and as a result, the brutality of it was widely condemned. Such publicity enabled Joseph A. Gavagan (D-New York) to gain support for anti-lynching legislation he had put forward in the House of Representatives; it was supported in the Senate by Democrats Robert F. Wagner (New York) and Frederick Van Nuys (Indiana). The legislation eventually passed in the House by 277 to 120, but the emerging Democratic Southern caucus blocked it in the Senate. Senator Allen Ellender (D-Louisiana) proclaimed: "We shall at all cost preserve the white supremacy of America."

The bill was passed by the United States House of Representatives with support from Republicans and Northern Democrats. It did not pass the Senate due to a filibuster started and led by Texas New Deal segregationist Tom Connally. This was seen as the start of the organised Southern Caucus. In the Senate, all Southern Democrats and most Republicans opposed imposing cloture, with the Great Plains and West being divided.

Proponents of the bill argued that lynching was a fundamental failure of the rule of law and of due process. Opponents of the bill argued that constitutionally, lynching was a State issue rather than a Federal issue, lynching was already in decline so a federal bill was unnecessary, and federal anti-lynching legislation would be unenforceable.
