= William S. White =

American journalist

William Smith White (May 20, 1905 – April 30, 1994) was an American journalist between the 1920s and 1970s. During his career, White worked with the Austin Statesman from 1926 to 1945 and the New York Times from 1945 to 1958. Upon leaving the New York Times in 1958, White spent the remainder of his journalism career with the United Feature Syndicate until his 1973 retirement. Outside of journalism, White was a biographer who won the 1955 Pulitzer Prize for Biography or Autobiography for The Taft Story. After writing works on Franklin D. Roosevelt and Lyndon B. Johnson throughout the 1960s, White received the Presidential Medal of Freedom in 1969.

== Early life and education ==
White was born on May 20, 1905, in De Leon, Texas. For his post secondary education, White attended the University of Texas.

== Career ==
While attending university, White entered journalism as a reporter for the Austin Statesman before becoming a legislative correspondent for the Associated Press in 1926. With the AP, White worked in Austin, Texas until moving to the newspaper's Washington D.C. branch in 1933. After leaving for New York in 1936, White was a photography editor until 1939. During World War II, White edited and reported stories about the war while also serving as an infantry for the United States Army.

In 1945, White left the Associated Press for the New York Times and worked as a political correspondent. White started reporting stories on the United States Senate from 1945 to 1952 before becoming chief congressional correspondent in 1952. The following year, White took a two month break from the newspaper in 1953 to write a posthumous biography about Robert A. Taft for Harper & Brothers. White's book, The Taft Story, was published in 1954 and received the Pulitzer Prize for Biography or Autobiography in May 1955. During his time with the New York Times, White covered global events including South American revolutions and the coloured vote constitutional crisis in the Union of South Africa. In 1957, White published Citadel: The Story of the United States Senate.

Near the end of his tenure with the New York newspaper, White briefly taught as a regents professor at the University of California, Berkeley from 1957 to 1958. When Thomas L. Stokes resigned from the United Feature Syndicate due to poor health, White left his position at the New York Times in 1958 to take over for Stokes. Throughout the 1960s, White wrote a book on Franklin D. Roosevelt in 1961 and one on Lyndon B. Johnson in 1964. White remained with UFS until his retirement in 1973.

== Awards ==
Apart from receiving the Pulitzer Prize for Biography or Autobiography in 1955, White was awarded the Presidential Medal of Freedom in January 1969.

== Personal life ==
White was married and had two children. White died on April 30, 1994, in Louisville, Kentucky.
