= Caroline Harris Davila =

American politician

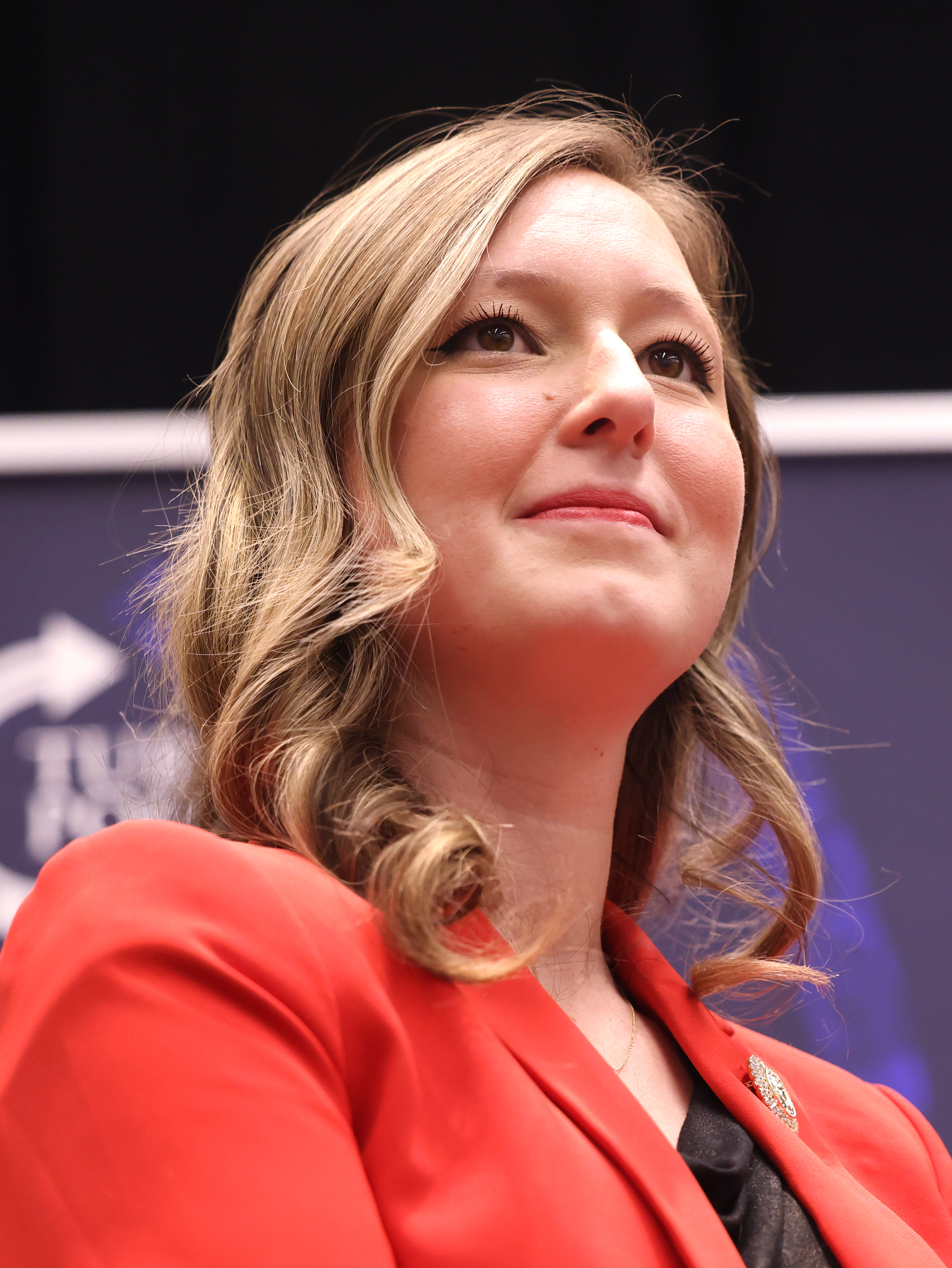
- Harris Davila in 2024

Member of the Texas House of Representatives from the 52nd district
- Incumbent
- Assumed office January 10, 2023
- Preceded by: James Talarico
- Succeeded by: Chris Jimenez (elect)

Personal details
- Born: Caroline Esther Harris; 1993 (age 32–33) Round Rock, Texas, U.S.
- Party: Republican
- Spouse: Darrell Davila
- Education: Thomas Edison State College (BA); University of Texas at Austin (MPA)
- Website: Campaign website

Caroline Esther Harris Davila (born 1993) is an American politician. She is a Republican member of the Texas House of Representatives from District 52, serving since 2023.

== Life and career ==
Harris Davila, who is of Asian descent, holds a bachelor's degree in communications from Thomas Edison State College and a master's degree in public affairs from the LBJ School at the University of Texas at Austin. She previously worked for State Senator Bryan Hughes as a policy adviser. In 2023, she married her husband Darrell Davila, chief of staff to Lieutenant Governor Dan Patrick.

== Election history ==
In 2022, incumbent James Talarico did not run for re-election to district 52 due to redistricting. Harris ran for the Texas House of Representatives. In March 2022, she defeated Patrick McGuinness in the Republican primary runoff with 50.6% of the vote. On November 8, 2022, Harris defeated Democrat Luis Echegaray in the general election, winning 55.9% of the vote. When she entered the House in 2023, she was the youngest Republican woman ever elected to the body. At the end of the term, she was named the "Freshman Legislator of the Year" by the Republican caucus.

In 2024, Harris Davila ran unopposed in the Republican primary. On November 5, 2024, she defeated Democrat Jennie Birkholz, winning 56.2% of the vote.
