= Diana Maldonado =

American politician (born 1963)

Member of the Texas House of Representatives from the 52nd district
- In office January 13, 2009 – January 11, 2011
- Preceded by: Mike Krusee
- Succeeded by: Larry Gonzales

Personal details
- Born: January 22, 1963 (age 63)
- Party: Democratic

Diana Maldonado (born January 22, 1963) is an American politician. She served one term in the Texas House of Representatives, representing the 52nd district from 2009 to 2011.

== Career ==
Prior to becoming a state representative, Maldonado worked as a government efficiency expert for the state of Texas. She also formerly served as the president of the school board of Round Rock, Texas.

Maldonado won election to the Texas House of Representatives in 2008, defeating Republican challenger Bryan Daniel by 851 votes. During her time in the state House, she served on the Defense & Veterans' Affairs and State Affairs committees. She ran for re-election in 2010, but lost to Republican challenger Larry Gonzales.

== Education ==
Maldonado obtained her bachelor's degree in business management from St. Edward's University.

== Electoral history ==
2010 Texas House of Representatives general election, District 52
Party	Candidate	Votes	%
Republican	Larry Gonzales	25,430	57.45
Democratic	Diana Maldonado	16,823	38.01
Libertarian	Charles McCoy	2,012	4.55
Total votes		44,265	100.0
Republican gain from Democratic			

2008 Texas House of Representatives general election, District 52
Party	Candidate	Votes	%
Democratic	Diana Maldonado	34,898	48.61
Republican	Bryan Daniel	34,047	47.42
Libertarian	Lillian Simmons	2,854	3.97
Total votes		71,799	100.0
Democratic gain from Republican			
