= Larry Gonzales (politician) =

American politician (born 1970)

Member of the Texas House of Representatives from the 52nd district
- In office January 11, 2011 – June 7, 2018
- Preceded by: Diana Maldonado
- Succeeded by: James Talarico

Personal details
- Born: January 29, 1970 (age 56) Houston, Texas, U.S.
- Party: Republican
- Education: University of Texas at Austin (BA); Texas State University (MA)
- Occupation: Business owner

Larry Gonzales (born 29 January 1970) is an American politician and business owner. He was a Republican member of the Texas House of Representatives for the 52nd district from 2011 to 2018.

== Election history ==
In 2010, Gonzales ran for election to the Texas House of Representatives. He defeated John Gordon in the Republican primary. On November 2, 2010, he defeated incumbent Democrat Diana Maldonado in the general election, winning 57.44% of the vote. He assumed office on January 11, 2011.

=== Resignation ===
Gonzalez did not file for re-election in 2018. On June 6, 2018, Gonzalez released a statement announcing that he would be resigning from office on June 7, 2018. He was succeeded by James Talarico on November 19, 2018.

Texas House of Representatives
Preceded by Diana Maldonado	Texas State Representative for the 52nd district 2011-2018	Succeeded by James Talarico
