= Chris Jimenez =

American politician

Member-elect of the Texas House of Representatives from the 52nd district
- Assuming office January 2027
- Succeeding: Caroline Harris Davila

Personal details
- Party: Democratic

Chris Jimenez is an American politician. A member of the Democratic Party, he is the member-elect for the 52nd district of the Texas House of Representatives.

Jimenez is a former member of the United States Marine Corps.

== Electoral history ==
2026 Texas House of Representatives election: District 52
Party	Candidate	Votes	%	±%
Democratic	Chris Jimenez	56,535	53.9%	
Republican	Caroline Harris Davila	48,404	46.1%	
