= Cory Booker's marathon speech =

Longest speech in U.S. Senate history

- Booker's complete speech
- Date: March 31 – April 1, 2025
- Duration: 25 hours, 5 minutes, 59 seconds
- Venue: United States Senate chamber
- Location: United States Capitol
- Type: Floor speech
- Motive: Protest the second presidency of Donald Trump and the operations of Elon Musk's Department of Government Efficiency

From March 31 to April 1, 2025, Democrat Cory Booker, the senior U.S. senator from New Jersey, delivered the longest recorded speech in United States Senate history while protesting the second presidency of Donald Trump and the operations of Elon Musk's Department of Government Efficiency.

Booker began speaking at 7 p.m. EDT on March 31 and concluded at 8:05 p.m. on April 1, 2025. The speech lasted twenty-five hours and five minutes, surpassing the previous longest recorded speech in Senate history: Strom Thurmond's twenty-four-hour-and-eighteen-minute-long filibuster of the Civil Rights Act of 1957 by 47 minutes.

== Background ==
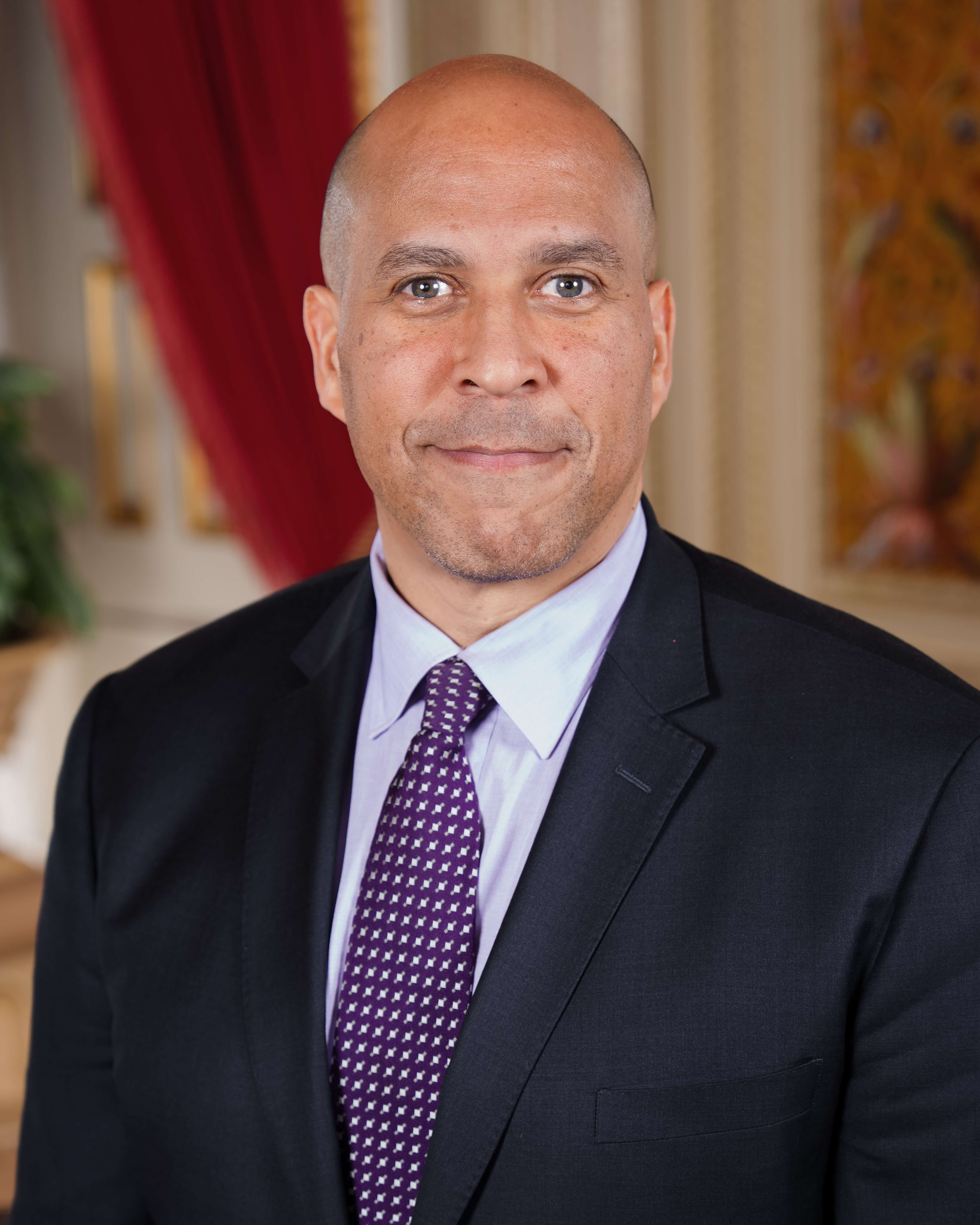
Booker's official portrait, 2025

The United States Senate does not limit debate unless limits have been imposed; in most circumstances, a senator who has been granted permission to speak by the presiding officer of the Senate may speak indefinitely so long as they "remain standing" and "speak more or less continuously." In preparation, Booker had not drunk water since the preceding day to avoid having to stop the speech to use the bathroom. He had also fasted for days leading up to the speech. Afterward, Booker said that rather than needing to use the bathroom, he instead felt dehydrated.

Booker's congressional staff prepared content for his speech, including writing talking points and gathering letters from constituents, which totaled over 1,164 pages of material. Booker claimed that they had prepared "ten binders" of content and periodically noted throughout his speech that he was "behind" on the pacing of his speech. Throughout the speech, staffers were seen delivering black binders to Booker's lectern.

== Speech ==
External videos
- U.S. Senate session beginning March 31, 2025 (30 hours, 20 minutes), C-SPAN

Booker concluding his speech

The speech began at 7 p.m. EDT on March 31, 2025, before unrelated deliberations for Matthew Whitaker's nomination to serve as ambassador to NATO. Booker dedicated the beginning of his speech to John Lewis, a civil rights activist and representative who died in 2020, and explained that he took the floor "with the intention of disrupting the normal business of the United States Senate for as long as I am physically able." He stated that he believed the country was in crisis, saying "In just 71 days, the president of the United States has inflicted so much harm on Americans' safety, financial stability, the core foundations of our democracy, and even our aspirations as a people." Booker emphasized his belief in the need to challenge actions he believed undermine democratic institutions and the rule of law.

By midnight, Booker focused on the administration's proposal to cut Social Security and Medicare. He criticized efforts to reduce funding for these programs, highlighting the potential negative impact on millions of Americans who rely on the benefits. Booker then addressed attempts to eliminate the Department of Education, sharing testimonials from educators and students affected by the policies. Turning his attention to immigration enforcement practices, he argued that the administration was undermining public safety and violating constitutional rights, again sharing testimonials of people who were adversely affected.

By 9 a.m., Booker stated that Donald Trump had abandoned America's allies, emboldening its enemies, and made the country less safe. Booker addressed the housing affordability crisis and referred to the vision outlined in Ezra Klein's book Abundance. He criticized the administration's failure to address rent and home prices and provided testimonials of families facing eviction and homelessness due to unaffordable housing. Booker criticized environmental policy rollbacks and the administration's refusal to honor existing USDA contracts, emphasizing the destabilizing effects on rural communities.

A few minutes into the speech, one of Booker's staff directed a Senate page to remove his chair. He read from multiple three-ring binders, including articles from bipartisan sources and letters from his constituents, whom he described as "'terrified people' with 'heartbreaking' stories". Booker invoked Arizona Senator John McCain and his vote to kill the American Health Care Act, a bill that would have partially repealed the Affordable Care Act. He read an account by Jasmine Mooney, a Canadian who was detained by U.S. Immigration and Customs Enforcement, for thirty minutes of his speech.

Offering an apology from Democrats for the current political climate, Booker stated: "I confess that I've been inadequate. That the Democrats have been responsible for allowing the rise of this demagogue." He emphasized the role of Congress to hold the executive branch accountable, and decried his fellow congress members for failing to vote against the president's cabinet nominees and other policies.

Booker's speech protested the actions of the Trump second presidency, including efforts to eliminate the U.S. Department of Education, ignore judicial mandates, and deport participants of the 2024 pro-Palestinian protests on university campuses. He criticized Trump and his advisor Elon Musk for having "shown a complete disregard for the rule of law, the Constitution, and the needs of the American people." Booker also criticized the Department of Government Efficiency (DOGE) led by Musk. He included a list of executive orders in Trump's second presidency during his speech. He also referenced John Lewis several times in his speech, stating:

I don't know what John Lewis would say, but John Lewis would do something. He would say something. What we will have to repent for is not the words and violent actions for bad people, but the appalling silence and inaction of good people. This is our moral moment.

According to David Smith of The Guardian, "As Booker approached the 24-hour mark, most Senate Democrats took their seats and Democrats from the House of Representatives, including minority leader Hakeem Jeffries, sat or stood in the chamber. The public and press galleries swelled." Senate minority leader Chuck Schumer announced to Booker that he had broken the record at 24 hours and 18 minutes into the speech, prompting sustained and significant applause throughout the chamber. Finally, at 8:05 p.m. EDT on April 1, 2025, Booker yielded the floor and was immediately met with a standing ovation.

=== Chronology ===
While retaining the floor, Booker yielded to questions from 35 of his Democratic colleagues and one Independent colleague, (Note: Angus King (I‑ME) is an independent senator who caucuses with the Democratic Party.) which allowed him to rest. The two senators who asked the most questions were the Senate minority leader Chuck Schumer and Senator Chris Murphy, a close colleague of Booker's who stayed on the floor with him throughout the entire speech. As they both mention during the speech, Booker played a similar role during the Chris Murphy gun control filibuster in 2016. The table below shows the chronology of the speech, including topics discussed by Booker, as well as questions posed to him by fellow senators. Topics in italics indicate subject divisions and refer to the labels of the binders from which Booker read.

Chronology of Senator Booker's speech
Questioner	Elapsed time	Time (EDT)	Topic
	00h 00m	7:00 pm	Senator Booker takes the floor
	00h 03m	7:03 pm	Motivation for speaking, John Lewis
	00h 22m	7:22 pm	Medicaid, letters
	01h 23m	8:23 pm	More Medicaid letters
Chuck Schumer (D‑NY) (Note: Senate minority leader)	02h 00m	9:00 pm	Medicaid cuts
	02h 08m	9:08 pm	Motivation for speaking
Lisa Blunt Rochester (D‑DE)	02h 13m	9:13 pm	Healthcare, Medicaid cuts
	03h 19m	10:19 pm	John McCain, health insurance legislative process, compromise, failures
Chuck Schumer (D‑NY)	03h 40m	10:40 pm	John McCain, a rational approach to government and military efficiency
	03h 52m	10:52 pm	End of John McCain/government efficiency section
	03h 54m	10:54 pm	Health infrastructure cuts
Chris Murphy (D‑CT)	04h 41m	11:41 pm	Healthcare, Medicaid cuts
	05h 11m	12:11 am	Social Security
	05h 53m	12:53 am	Letter about Parkinson's disease, response
Andy Kim (D‑NJ)	06h 27m	1:27 am	Governance, Social Security
Chris Murphy (D‑CT)	07h 30m	2:30 am	Social Security, story
	08h 07m	3:07 am	Education and scientific research
Chris Murphy (D‑CT)	09h 10m	4:10 am	War on knowledge
	09h 42m	4:42 am	Immigration
	09h 44m	4:44 am	Deportation of Kilmar Abrego Garcia
	10h 03m	5:03 am	Disappearing people, statement by Supreme Court Justice Antonin Scalia
	10h 20m	5:20 am	Detention of Jasmine Mooney by ICE
Chris Murphy (D‑CT)	10h 49m	5:49 am	Immigration
Peter Welch (D‑VT)	11h 20m	6:20 am	Immigration, bipartisan cooperation, tariffs on Canada
	11h 52m	6:52 am	Bipartisan cooperation
Dick Durbin (D‑IL)	12h 12m	7:12 am	Judiciary committee nominees, presidential defiance of court orders
Kirsten Gillibrand (D‑NY)	12h 23m	7:23 am	Social Security, FAA understaffing, drones, mass federal layoffs
	12h 53m	7:53 am	Four letters on national security, mass layoffs, USAID, taunting allies
Tina Smith (D‑MN)	13h 01m	8:01 am	Immigration, detention of Rümeysa Öztürk, freedom of speech
Raphael Warnock (D‑GA)	13h 30m	8:30 am	Healthcare accessibility
Amy Klobuchar (D‑MN)	13h 52m	8:52 am	Tax cuts, prescription drug cost reductions
	14h 22m	9:22 am	The power of the people, Ukraine
Ron Wyden (D‑OR)	14h 31m	9:31 am	Town hall meetings
Chris Coons (D‑DE)	14h 54m	9:54 am	USDA halts deliveries to food banks, NATO, Denmark
Ed Markey (D‑MA)	15h 12m	10:12 am	Tax cuts
Mark Warner (D‑VA)	15h 23m	10:23 am	Ignoring security classifications
Chuck Schumer (D‑NY)	15h 32m	10:32 am	Medicaid cuts, tariffs, congratulations
Elizabeth Warren (D‑MA)	15h 48m	10:48 am	Social Security
	16h 01m	11:01 am	National security, USAID
Chris Murphy (D‑CT)	16h 21m	11:21 am	USAID
	16h 24m	11:24 am	Housing availability
Chris Van Hollen (D‑MD)	16h 28m	11:28 am	Social Security, Medicaid, food, tariffs, disappearing people
Angela Alsobrooks (D‑MD)	16h 50m	11:50 am	Housing crisis
	16h 58m	11:58 am	Environmental protections
	17h 00m	12:00 pm	Noon prayer
Tammy Duckworth (D‑IL)	17h 02m	12:02 pm	Agriculture, farmers
Maggie Hassan (D‑NH)	17h 16m	12:16 pm	Medicaid expansion, health insurance, Social Security
Ben Ray Luján (D‑NM)	17h 42m	12:42 pm	Agriculture, farmers
Sheldon Whitehouse (D‑RI)	17h 53m	12:53 pm	Greed and corruption in elections
Patty Murray (D‑WA)	18h 06m	1:06 pm	Veterans
Michael Bennet (D‑CO)	18h 30m	1:30 pm	Borrowing, tax cuts
Jack Reed (D‑RI)	18h 45m	1:45 pm	HHS layoffs
Maria Cantwell (D‑WA)	18h 54m	1:54 pm	Medicaid cuts
Alex Padilla (D‑CA)	19h 06m	2:06 pm	Environment
	19h 14m	2:14 pm	Impassioned statement, Frederick Douglass letter
Angus King Jr. (I‑ME)	19h 30m	2:30 pm	Courage, veterans (30% of the Federal workforce)
Adam Schiff (D‑CA)	19h 42m	2:42 pm	Attacks on lawyers, judges, and the press, impeachment trial
Richard Blumenthal (D‑CT)	20h 02m	3:02 pm	Signalgate
Jacky Rosen (D‑NV)	20h 14m	3:14 pm	Tariffs and policies affecting consumer costs, tourism
	20h 20m	3:20 pm	January 6, bridging differences
Tammy Duckworth (D‑IL)	20h 30m	3:30 pm	Firing veterans
	20h 37m	3:37 pm	John McCain - The Pledge of Allegiance and the Hanoi Hilton
Tammy Duckworth (D‑IL)	20h 43m	3:43 pm	John McCain, veterans
	20h 49m	3:49 pm	Veterans
Chris Coons (D‑DE)	20h 55m	3:55 pm	Rory Badger (US marine fired by USDA), John McCain, honor
	20h 55m	3:55 pm	The economy
	21h 00m	4:00 pm	What speaks to the greatness of our nation? What does the Bible say?
Tim Kaine (D‑VA)	21h 22m	4:22 pm	Signs of the times, state flags, tyranny
Chuck Schumer (D‑NY)	21h 41m	4:41 pm	Kudos, breaking rules to get tax cuts for the rich by going around the parliamentarian
	21h 48m	4:48 pm	President Joe Biden, historian Jon Meacham, history, the people came through
Tammy Baldwin (D‑WI)	22h 01m	5:01 pm	HHS firings, tariffs
Angela Alsobrooks (D‑MD)	22h 18m	5:18 pm	Educational funding
Mark E. Kelly (D‑AZ)	22h 29m	5:29 pm	Tariffs, tax cuts
Mazie Hirono (D‑HI)	23h 09m	6:09 pm	Federal mass layoffs
	23h 35m	6:35 pm	The Constitution: Judge Learned Hand, Margaret Chase Smith. "The Constitution saved my life." Filibuster with Chris Murphy.
Chris Murphy (D‑CT)	23h 49m	6:49 pm	Solidarity, history, Senator Strom Thurmond filibuster, summation
	23h 58m	6:58 pm	Motivations, John Lewis, history
Chuck Schumer (D‑NY)	24h 19m	7:19 pm	Schumer congratulates Booker on breaking the record (24h 18m), ovation
	24h 21m	7:21 pm	Thanks for support, begins closing
Catherine Cortez Masto (D‑NV)	24h 24m	7:24 pm	End of Alzheimer's disease research
	24h 28m	7:28 pm	Values, Alzheimer's, efficiency, corruption
Jeanne Shaheen (D‑NH)	24h 44m	7:44 pm	USAID Accomplishments, Atul Gawande
	24h 54m	7:54 pm	Closing
	25h 05m	8:05 pm	Senator Booker yields the floor

== Outcome and result ==
At over 25 hours in length, Booker's speech became the longest speech in United States Senate history, surpassing the previous record of 24 hours and 18 minutes set by Senator Strom Thurmond, who began a filibuster to prevent the passing of the Civil Rights Act of 1957. Booker had been bothered by Thurmond holding the record, saying it "just really irked me, that he would be the longest speech—that the longest speech, on our great Senate floor, was someone who was trying to stop people like me from being in the Senate." During Booker's speech, just before breaking Thurmond's record, Booker said, "To hate him is wrong, and maybe my ego got too caught up in if I stood here maybe, maybe—just maybe—I could break this record of the man who tried to stop the rights upon which I stand. ... I'm not here, though, because of his speech. I'm here despite his speech. I'm here because as powerful as he was, the people were more powerful."

Immediately following the speech, deliberations on Matthew Whitaker's nomination to serve as ambassador to NATO resumed on the Senate floor, resulting in the Senate confirming his nomination later that evening 52–45. According to David Smith, Booker's speech was "not technically a filibuster" to prevent a piece of legislation from passing. The speech was widely televised, appearing on C-SPAN and livestreamed on Booker's accounts, including on TikTok, YouTube, Twitter, and Instagram. Several news organizations had live feeds for the speech, including the Associated Press, PBS, CBS News, MSNBC, and The Guardian.

Booker received widespread praise from Democrats, including former House Speaker Nancy Pelosi and Representative Ilhan Omar, who stated that "this is the kind of relentless resistance our democracy demands." Former vice president Kamala Harris praised Booker for amplifying the voices of Americans affected by the current administration's policies and for exemplifying leadership that uplifts others. Senator Lisa Murkowski (R-AK), a moderate Republican, congratulated Booker on setting a new record for the longest Senate floor speech. The live stream of Booker's floor speech on TikTok received more than 350 million likes and, according to Senator Booker's office, was viewed by more than 300,000 people at once.

=== Analysis ===
Various media outlets and opinion columns characterized Booker's speech as a potential turning point for Democrats. Semafor's Burgess Everett assessed the speech as a juxtaposition to the Democratic Party's "wait-and-see" strategy. Writing for The Guardian, David Smith characterized the speech as a "primal act of resistance" and that Booker "made a persuasive case that an inability to do everything should not undermine an attempt to do something." Hayes Brown, an opinion writer for MSNBC, called the speech a "rallying point for a demoralized party," and asked "whether Democrats can keep this energy going beyond this specific moment". Providing analysis for The Independent, Richard Hall stated that Booker's speech was "both a sign of desperation and a call to arms", and that the Democratic party had so far struggled to find a response to Trump's administration. Nia-Malika Henderson, a politics and policy columnist for Bloomberg Opinion suggested that Booker's speech could "rebrand" the Democratic Party as more populist and less risk-averse, drawing parallels to political movements, such as the Tea Party movement, which eventually led to Trump's rise.

The speech was also noted by Steven Zeitchik of The Hollywood Reporter for its scope. Zeitchik praised Booker's speech as "the Screen Performance of the Year", describing the speech as a "cinematic spectacle". Zeitchik noted the variety in Booker's speech, stating that "you'd experience different arcs; come in at different moments and you'd infer different genres." Natalie Korach of Vanity Fair called the speech a masterclass in social media savvy, quoting a Booker aide that stated Booker had taken on a leadership role to "demonstrate to his colleagues the power of social media to reach people." Ed Kilgore, a columnist for Intelligencer, questioned the effectiveness of Booker's speech in stopping Trump. Republican Party pollster Frank Luntz argued that the performance established Booker as a leading contender in the Democratic Party for the 2028 United States presidential election.

== See also ==
- Filibuster in the United States Senate
- Strom Thurmond filibuster of the Civil Rights Act of 1957
