= Chris Murphy gun control filibuster =

2016 speech by US politician on gun control

The entire 14-hour and 50-minute filibuster, as broadcast by C-SPAN

On June 15, 2016, in the wake of a mass shooting in Orlando, Florida, Senator Chris Murphy, Democrat of Connecticut, launched a filibuster in the United States Senate, promising to hold the floor "for as long as I can" or until Congress acts on gun control legislation.

Murphy eventually secured a commitment from Senate leadership to hold a vote on two measures that he supports—one to expand background checks and another to block suspected terrorists from purchasing weapons—and ended his filibuster after 14 hours and 50 minutes, making it the eleventh-longest filibuster in the U.S. Senate since 1900.

== Background and goals ==
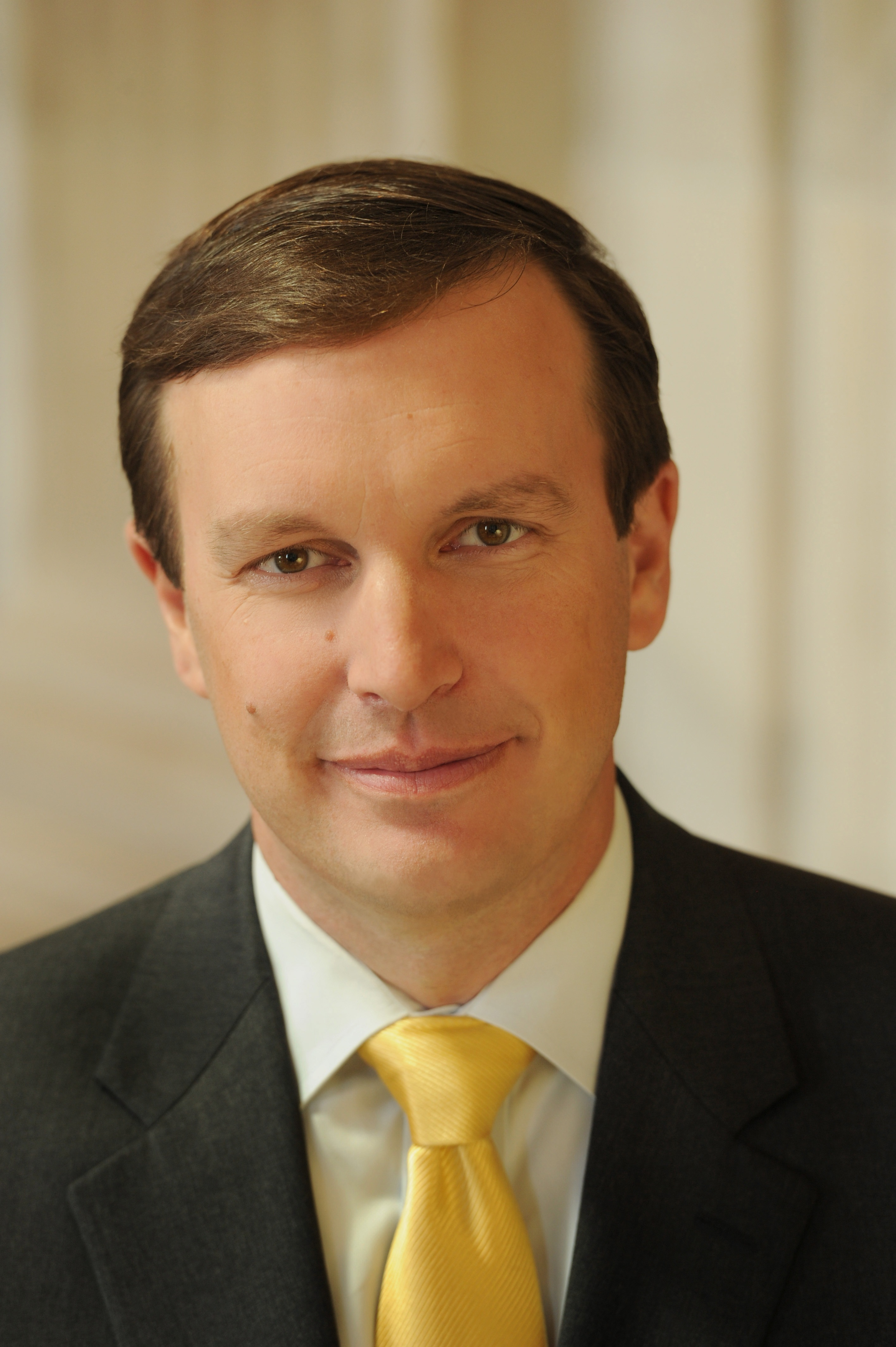
Chris Murphy, 2013

In the Senate Murphy represents Connecticut, where 20 schoolchildren and six educators were killed in December 2012 in the Sandy Hook Elementary School shooting. Murphy stated on the Senate floor during the filibuster, "For those of us that represent Connecticut, the failure of this body to do anything, anything at all in the face of that continued slaughter isn't just painful to us, it's unconscionable."

Murphy was seeking a vote on legislation that would expand background checks required for weapons purchases, and on a measure sponsored by Senator Dianne Feinstein of California that would allow the U.S. to ban sales of guns and explosives to people listed on government watch lists of suspected terrorists. The Feinstein Amendment came to the Senate floor one day after 14 people were killed by Rizwan Farook and Tashfeen Malik in the San Bernardino terrorist attack in December 2015, but failed on a party-line vote, with Democrats in favor and Republicans opposed.

On the day that Murphy began his filibuster, Senator John Cornyn, Republican of Texas, said that he was in talks with Feinstein about possible compromise legislation on blocking gun sales to terrorism suspects. Separately, Everytown for Gun Safety, a pro-gun control group supported by former New York City Mayor Michael Bloomberg, said that it was in compromise talks with Senator Pat Toomey, Republican of Pennsylvania, who made a brief statement on the Senate floor in favor of some sort of bipartisan agreement.

== Filibuster ==
Murphy began his filibuster at 11:21 a.m. EDT during a debate over an unrelated spending bill, and stated that his goal was to force the Senate and the United States House of Representatives to expand background checks of would-be gun purchasers, and to make it impossible for individuals listed on the FBI's various lists of suspected terrorism participants and no-fly lists to legally purchase guns from FFL holders. As a Murphy spokesman put it, the Senator would "hold the floor to push for a vote on amendments to close the terror gap and expand background checks."

Under Senate rules, Murphy was permitted to yield for the purposes of taking questions while not yielding the floor; as in recent past filibusters, this allowed supporters of the filibuster to make speeches of their own which were nominally questions, temporarily relieving Murphy from having to constantly speak. Murphy was joined over the course of the nearly 15-hour-long filibuster by 38 of his 45 fellow Senate Democrats. Some, including Richard Blumenthal of Connecticut and Cory Booker of New Jersey, stood with Murphy for hours. Other Democratic senators appearing on the floor included Bill Nelson of Florida, Dick Durbin of Illinois, Chuck Schumer and Kirsten Gillibrand of New York, and Joe Manchin of West Virginia, as well as Elizabeth Warren and Ed Markey of Massachusetts. Other Democratic senators joining the filibuster included Ben Cardin and Barbara Mikulski of Maryland, Patrick Leahy of Vermont, Al Franken and Amy Klobuchar of Minnesota, Patty Murray and Maria Cantwell of Washington, Gary Peters and Debbie Stabenow of Michigan, Bob Casey of Pennsylvania, Ron Wyden and Jeff Merkley of Oregon, Bob Menendez of New Jersey, Jeanne Shaheen of New Hampshire, Claire McCaskill of Missouri, Mark Warner and Tim Kaine of Virginia, Sherrod Brown of Ohio, Tom Carper of Delaware, Tammy Baldwin of Wisconsin, Tom Udall and Martin Heinrich of New Mexico, Michael Bennet of Colorado, Brian Schatz and Mazie Hirono of Hawaii, Sheldon Whitehouse and Jack Reed of Rhode Island, and Joe Donnelly of Indiana. Independent Angus King of Maine, who caucuses with the Democrats, put questions as well.

Two Republicans appeared on the floor to engage with Murphy with questions: first Ben Sasse of Nebraska and then Pat Toomey of Pennsylvania.

In his remarks on the floor, Murphy said, "I really do worry that there is a quiet, unintentional message of endorsement that's sent when we do nothing or when all we do is talk. I think when there is not a collective condemnation with policy change from what is supposedly the world's greatest deliberative body that there are very quiet cues that are picked up by people who are contemplating the unthinkable in their mind."

Murphy formally yielded the floor, ending the filibuster, at 2:11 a.m. EDT the following day, after 14 hours and 50 minutes.

== Impact ==
Murphy ended the filibuster after securing a commitment from Senate leadership to hold votes on two Democratic proposals: the Feinstein proposal to ban persons on terrorist watch lists from obtaining guns, and the Murphy-Booker-Schumer proposal to expand background checks to gun shows and Internet sales. Republicans plan to raise two of their own proposals.

Senator Dianne Feinstein's amendment to ban weapon sales to those on the terrorist watch list failed with a vote of 47–53. The only Republicans supporting the amendment were Mark Kirk of Illinois and Kelly Ayotte of New Hampshire. North Dakota's Heidi Heitkamp was the sole Democrat opposing it. The background checks provision also failed, 44–56, with Kirk being the solitary Republican supporting it. Just three Democrats—Heitkamp, Jon Tester of Montana, and Joe Manchin of West Virginia—opposed it. "Instead of getting help from their elected officials, our constituents see a disturbing pattern of inaction," Minority Leader Harry Reid said. "It's always the same. After each tragedy...we Democrats try to pass sensible gun safety measures. Sadly, our efforts are blocked by the Republicans in Congress who take their marching orders from the National Rifle Association."

Republicans who opposed Democrats' background check and watch list bills favored alternate measures which they claim better protect the right to due process. One, by Senator John Cornyn of Texas, and drawing NRA support, would mandate a three-day delay for a gun sale to someone on a watch list, then compel law enforcement to prove probable cause to prevent the sale. Democrats criticized it as unrealistic, citing that if investigators possessed such probable cause to suspect someone of terrorism, the buyers would already have been arrested. It failed with a vote of 53–47. Senator Chuck Grassley of Iowa put forth a measure that would have given additional funding to the agency responsible for processing gun background checks, but would not have actually expanded such checks. Grassley's amendment also would change the definition of "has been adjudicated mentally incompetent" for the purpose of gun-sale prohibition and would have made it easier for persons denied on such grounds to appeal rejections. The Grassley amendment also failed with a vote of 53–47.

Manchin and Toomey, who had both joined the filibuster, had together proposed tightening background checks in 2013, after the Sandy Hook Elementary School shooting, but Manchin was targeted by the NRA in a 2013 advertisement after having received an "A" rating by them in 2012. Tester won elections in 2006 and 2012 by narrow pluralities. His victory was one of the two closest and last decided Senate races in the 2006 midterms, which saw Democrats regain control of the Senate. The Los Angeles Times highlighted Tester's separation from his party's gun control positions.

== See also ==
- 2016 United States House of Representatives sit-in
- Cory Booker's marathon speech
- Filibuster in the United States Senate
- Gun control after the Sandy Hook Elementary School shooting
- Gun politics in the United States
- Gun violence in the United States
