= James Talarico =

American politician (born 1989)

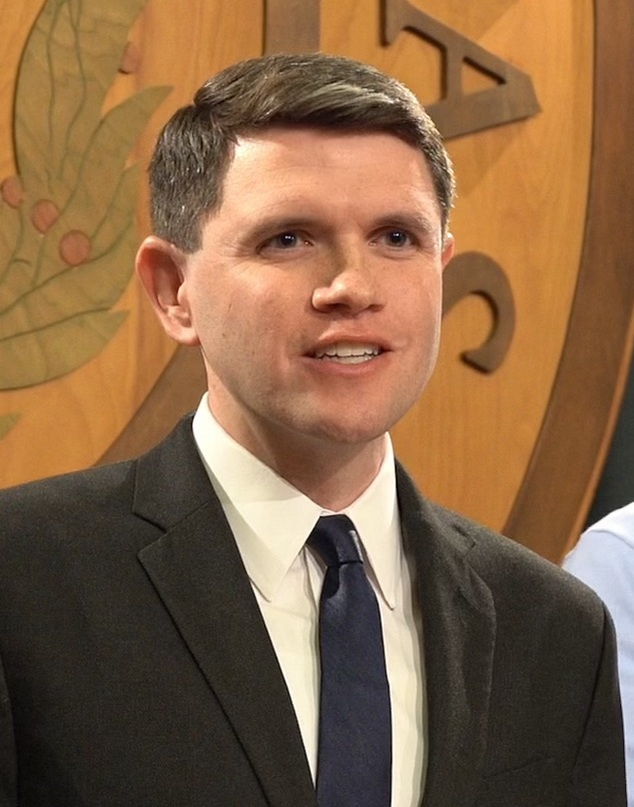
- Talarico in 2025

United States Senator-elect from Texas
- Assuming office January 3, 2027
- Succeeding: John Cornyn

Member of the Texas House of Representatives
- Incumbent
- Assumed office November 20, 2018
- Preceded by: Larry Gonzales
- Constituency: 52nd district (2018–2023); 50th district (2023–present)

Personal details
- Born: James Dell Collins; May 17, 1989 (age 37) Round Rock, Texas, U.S.
- Party: Democratic
- Education: University of Texas at Austin (BA); Harvard University (MEd); Austin Presbyterian Theological Seminary (MA)
- Website: State House website; Campaign website

James Dell Talarico (/ˌtæləˈriːkoʊ/ TAL-ə-REE-koh, born May 17, 1989) is an American politician and educator who is a United States senator-elect from Texas. A member of the Democratic Party, he has served since 2018 as a member of the Texas House of Representatives.

Born in Round Rock, Texas, Talarico taught sixth-grade language arts at Rhodes Middle School in West San Antonio, Texas, from 2011 to 2013. He is a graduate of the University of Texas at Austin (UT) and earned his Master of Education at Harvard University. He also served as an executive director for an education nonprofit. He is serving his fourth term in the Texas House of Representatives, having first been elected in 2018. While serving in the Texas House, Talarico started to pursue a Master of Divinity at Austin Presbyterian Theological Seminary.

Talarico has been described as populist and a progressive who is influenced by Christian social teaching. He was elected to the U.S. Senate in 2026, defeating U.S. representative Jasmine Crockett in the Democratic primary and Republican nominee Ken Paxton in the general election. He is the first Democrat to win a U.S. Senate election in Texas since 1988 and will become the youngest sitting U.S. senator.

== Early life and education ==
James Dell Collins was born in Round Rock, Texas, on May 17, 1989, to Tamara Causey, who separated from his biological father when he was seven weeks old. A few months later Tamara married Mark Talarico, who adopted James and gave him his surname. Talarico attended Round Rock Independent School District schools and graduated from McNeil High School in Williamson County, Texas, where he competed in speech and debate. He also acted in the school's drama productions, including playing Danny Zuko in Grease. Talarico's maternal grandfather, Jimmy Causey, was a Baptist preacher at several churches in South Texas.

Before earning his Bachelor of Arts degree in government from the University of Texas at Austin in 2011, he organized students for tuition relief. Talarico later earned a Master of Education degree in education policy from the Harvard Graduate School of Education in 2016 and earned a Master of Arts in theological studies at Austin Presbyterian Theological Seminary in 2025. He is currently studying for a Master of Divinity there as well.

== Early career ==
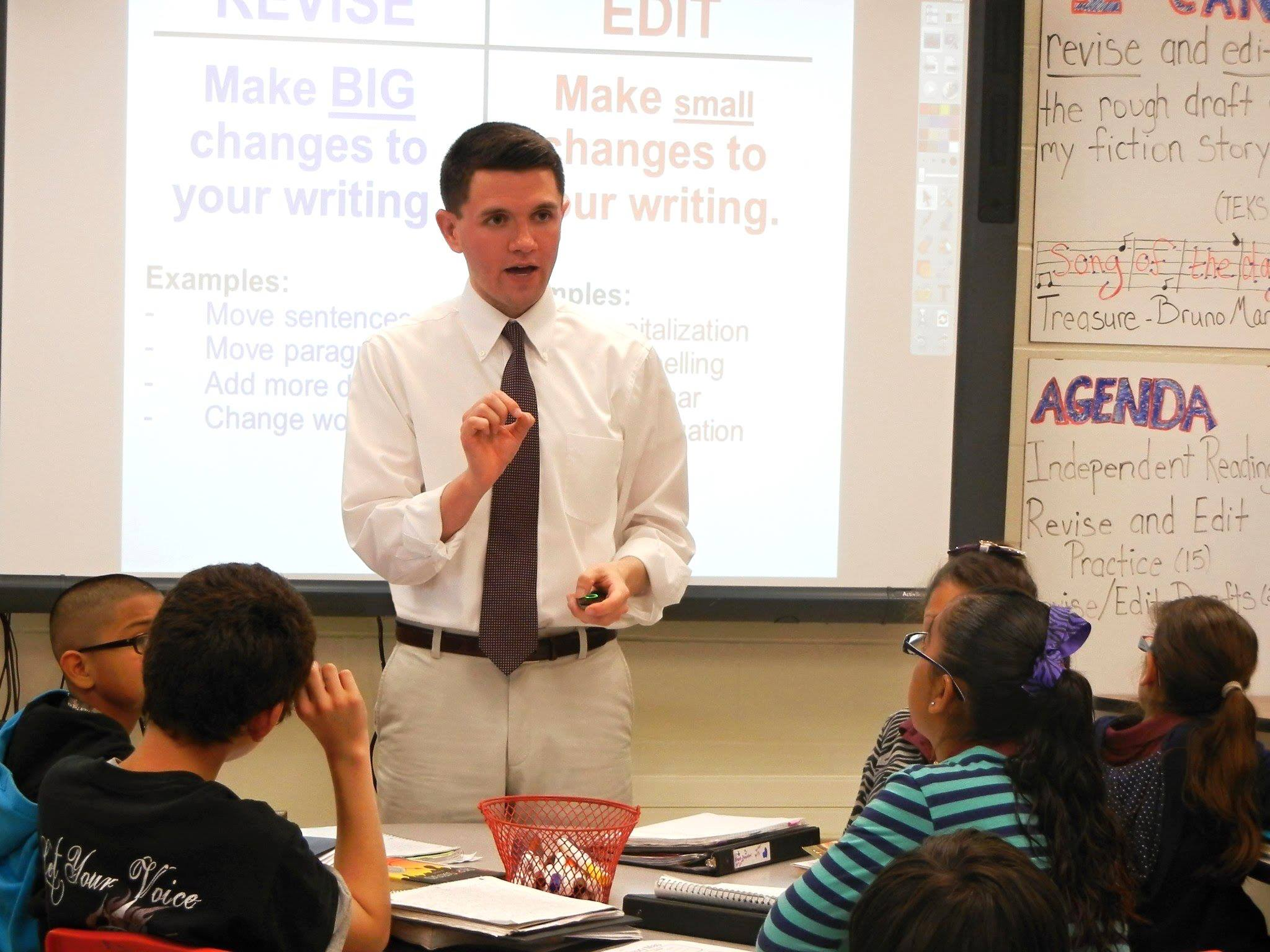
Talarico teaching 6th grade language arts at Rhodes Middle School in West San Antonio, 2013

In 2011, Talarico joined Teach For America and taught sixth-grade English language arts at Rhodes Middle School on the west side of San Antonio. Talarico has said his experience teaching at-risk and low-income students shaped his understanding of Texas's socioeconomic disparities and his advocacy for increased school funding and student well-being. He described his class sizes as crowded, with one having 45 students, though records from the Texas Education Agency showed his largest class size being 30, with most between 22 and 27; his spokesman said Talarico had initially had 45 students placed in his classroom and then worked with school administrators to redistribute students across classes. After two years of teaching, he became Central Texas executive director for Reasoning Mind, a nonprofit that implements computer-based math lessons in classrooms.

== Texas House of Representatives ==
Talarico was first elected to the Texas House of Representatives in 2018 at age 29, becoming the legislature's youngest member during the 2019 session. During his four terms in the Republican-majority legislature, Talarico served as lead author of nearly 200 bills, 16 of which became law. Eight of the enacted bills addressed education, childcare, or youth workforce development.

=== First term (2018–2019) ===
Talarico launched his campaign for the Texas House shortly after incumbent state legislator Larry Gonzales chose not to run for reelection. He won the concurrent special and general elections against Republican nominee Cynthia Flores, garnering media attention for walking the full length of the district. He was sworn into the Texas House of Representatives on November 20, 2018, and appointed to the Public Education and Juvenile Justice Committees.

In the 86th Texas Legislature, Talarico filed the Whole Student Agenda, a 24-bill public education policy legislative package. The legislature passed two bills from this list. The first, HB 3012, required that students suspended from school have an alternative means to receive coursework. HB 455, also sponsored by Talarico, was written to provide a standardized school recess policy. Governor Greg Abbott vetoed the bill.

Talarico was a coauthor of House Bill 3, the school-finance legislation enacted in 2019. The law increased pre-student funding, provided funding for teacher pay increases, and funded full-day prekindergarten for eligible four-year-olds.

=== Second term (2020–2021) ===
Talarico defeated former Hutto city council member Lucio Valdez with 51.5% of the vote. In the 87th Texas Legislature, he was reappointed to the Public Education and Juvenile Justice Committees and appointed to the Calendars Committee. During the 87th legislative session, Talarico filed HB 54, also known as Javier Ambler's Law, and the legislature passed it. It prohibits state law enforcement agencies, except game wardens, from entering into contracts with reality TV shows that film them in the line of duty. This was in response to the role Live PD is alleged to have played in the killing of Javier Ambler by Williamson County, Texas, police. Talarico had previously criticized Sheriff Robert Chody's handling of the incident, calling for his resignation.

Talarico was the primary author of HB 30, which provides a path for minors in the criminal justice system who have been adjudicated as adults or who are eligible under the Individuals with Disabilities Education Act to earn a high school diploma instead of pursuing a high school equivalency.

Talarico introduced House Bill 41 to establish class-size limits for public school prekindergarten programs. Similar legislation, Senate Bill 2081, became law in 2021, establishing a maximum of 22 students in covered prekindergarten classes, subject to exceptions and waivers.

In 2018, Talarico was diagnosed with type 1 diabetes during a five-day stint in the ICU after a campaign event where he walked 25 miles (40 km) across his district. After his diagnosis, he paid $684 for his first 30-day supply of insulin. Talarico was the House joint sponsor helping to pass House Bill 82, capping insulin costs at $25 per month. In 2021, Talarico was a joint author of House Bill 82 and one of the House sponsors of its Senate companion, Senate Bill 827. SB 827 became law, capping out-of-pocket copays for a 30-day supply of insulin at $25 for people covered by state-regulated health plans.

In the summer of 2021, Democrats in the Texas House of Representatives, including Talarico, organized a quorum break in an attempt to stop the passage of the Election Integrity Protection Act of 2021. They flew to Washington, D.C., to lobby the Senate to pass the John Lewis Voting Rights Act and the For the People Act, which would have superseded parts of the state legislation. Talarico was one of the first Democrats to return to Texas as the quorum break progressed, arguing that the effort had achieved its goals, that Democrats needed to reduce the harm of Republican legislation, and that an indefinite quorum break was unsustainable. Some representatives who remained in D.C. strongly criticized him for this. Quorum was eventually reestablished and the legislation passed. At the end of the legislative session, Texas Monthly magazine named Talarico one of the Top 10 Best Legislators.

=== Third term (2022–2023) ===
After his district was made significantly more Republican during the 2020 redistricting process, Talarico announced he would run in neighboring House District 50, a safe Democratic seat being vacated by Celia Israel. His previous district was a swing district. Talarico won the primary election with 78.5% of the vote and the general election with 76.8%. During the 88th Texas Legislature, he was the primary author of House Bill 25, which would create the Texas Wholesale Prescription Drug Importation Program and allow Texas to import lower-cost Canadian medications approved by the U.S. Food and Drug Administration.

Talarico was an outspoken critic of legislation that would have required the display of the Ten Commandments in all elementary and secondary classrooms, on the constitutional grounds of separation of church and state. He called the measure "un-American" and "un-Christian". The bill did not pass the state house.

Talarico was a House sponsor of Senate Bill 1145, which allowed cities and counties to offer property-tax exemptions to qualifying childcare facilities. The measure was intended to reduce providers' operating costs amid concerns about the high cost of daycare. Eligible facilities must participate in the Texas Rising Star quality-rating program and have at least 20% of enrolled children receiving state childcare subsidies.

=== Fourth term (2024–2025) ===
Talarico defeated Nathan Boynton in the Democratic primary and was unopposed in the general election. In 2025, he continued to oppose placing the Ten Commandments in Texas public schools. The specific legislation, SB 10, required every classroom to visibly display a poster containing the Ten Commandments, sized at least 16 by 20 inches. When the bill was first brought to the floor of the Texas House, Talarico called a point of order that delayed its passage. The bill ultimately passed the legislature, but videos of his remarks against it went viral and led to an appearance on The Joe Rogan Experience.

Talarico was a joint author of House Bill 3133, enacted in 2025, which established reporting and removal requirements for explicit deepfake material on social media platforms. The law required platforms to acknowledge reports, remove reported material and known identical copies, and take measures to prevent material determined to be explicit deepfake content from being reposted.

During the legislative debate over private school vouchers, Talarico, who opposed the legislation, attempted to amend the bill to have a statewide referendum determine whether the program would go into effect. The legislation passed and was signed into law without the amendment. In August 2025, Talarico was one of 51 Democratic Texas House members who broke quorum to delay the passage of mid-decade new congressional maps. While he was absent from the state, Attorney General Ken Paxton filed a lawsuit to expel Talarico and 12 other representatives from the House by declaring their seats vacant. Talarico and the others named in the suit returned to the state before the Texas Supreme Court ruled in the case. In May 2026, the court determined it did not have jurisdiction to resolve a legislative dispute and dismissed the case.

=== Committee assignments ===
For the 89th legislative session:

- Committee on Trade, Workforce & Economic Development (vice chair)
- Committee on Public Education (2019–Pres.)
  - Subcommittee on Academic & Career-Oriented Education (vice chair)
- Committee on House Administration

Previous committee assignments:

- Committee on Calendars (2021–2025)
- Committee on Educational Opportunity and Enrichment, Select (2023)
- Committee on Juvenile Justice and Family Issues (2019–2025)

== Christian ministry and theology ==
A Mainline Protestant with Magisterial views, he has cited the Catholic popes Leo XIV and Francis as his "spiritual heroes" for their contributions to Christian social teaching, which has influenced his views on economic matters.

Talarico is a member of the Presbyterian Church (USA), and has cited the teachings of Jesus as the reason for launching his political career in order to love God and one's neighbor. He has said that Christian ethics should affect how society and politics broadly function, as it is "another word for how we treat our neighbors". Talarico has said that people should not affirm "a progressive or conservative Christianity" but a "Biblical Christianity".

Talarico is a critic of the recent rise of Christian nationalism in the United States and has called it "a cancer on our religion". He said, "there's nothing Christian about Christian nationalism". In a 2023 guest sermon, Talarico called Christian nationalism "the worship of power—social power, economic power, political power, in the name of Christ". He has said Christian nationalists have turned Jesus "into a gun-toting, gay-bashing, science-denying, money-loving, fear-mongering fascist" and that it is "incumbent on all Christians to confront it and denounce it".

In a 2025 interview, he said there is no "set Christian orthodoxy" on abortion due to its absence in the Bible and cited Mary's consent in the Annunciation in explaining his view that "creation has to be done with consent" and freedom.

Talarico is active in St. Andrew's Presbyterian Church in Austin.

== U.S. Senate ==
=== 2026 election ===
On September 9, 2025, Talarico announced his candidacy for the 2026 U.S. Senate election in Texas. He and U.S. Representative Jasmine Crockett vied for the Democratic nomination. In February 2026, the Houston Chronicle, the Austin American-Statesman, The Dallas Morning News, and the Fort Worth Star-Telegram endorsed Talarico. (Note: Attributed to multiple sources:) Later in February, the FCC opened an investigation into Talarico's appearance on The View, citing a potential violation of the equal-time rule. Late-night and talk shows were exempt from the requirement until an FCC rule change in January 2026.

Talarico's Senate campaign logo

On February 16, 2026, Talarico was scheduled to appear on The Late Show with Stephen Colbert. Colbert said CBS canceled the interview because of the Trump administration's "intensifying pressure against broadcast TV networks". He said the network's lawyers had instructed him not to have Talarico on the show or mention the cancellation. Against their advice, he interviewed Talarico and spoke publicly about the cancellation. Colbert accused CBS of censorship and posted the interview to the show's YouTube page instead, where it had gained 7.3 million views by February 18, making it the most viewed interview segment on The Late Show's channel in a year, which led to a surge in donations to his campaign.

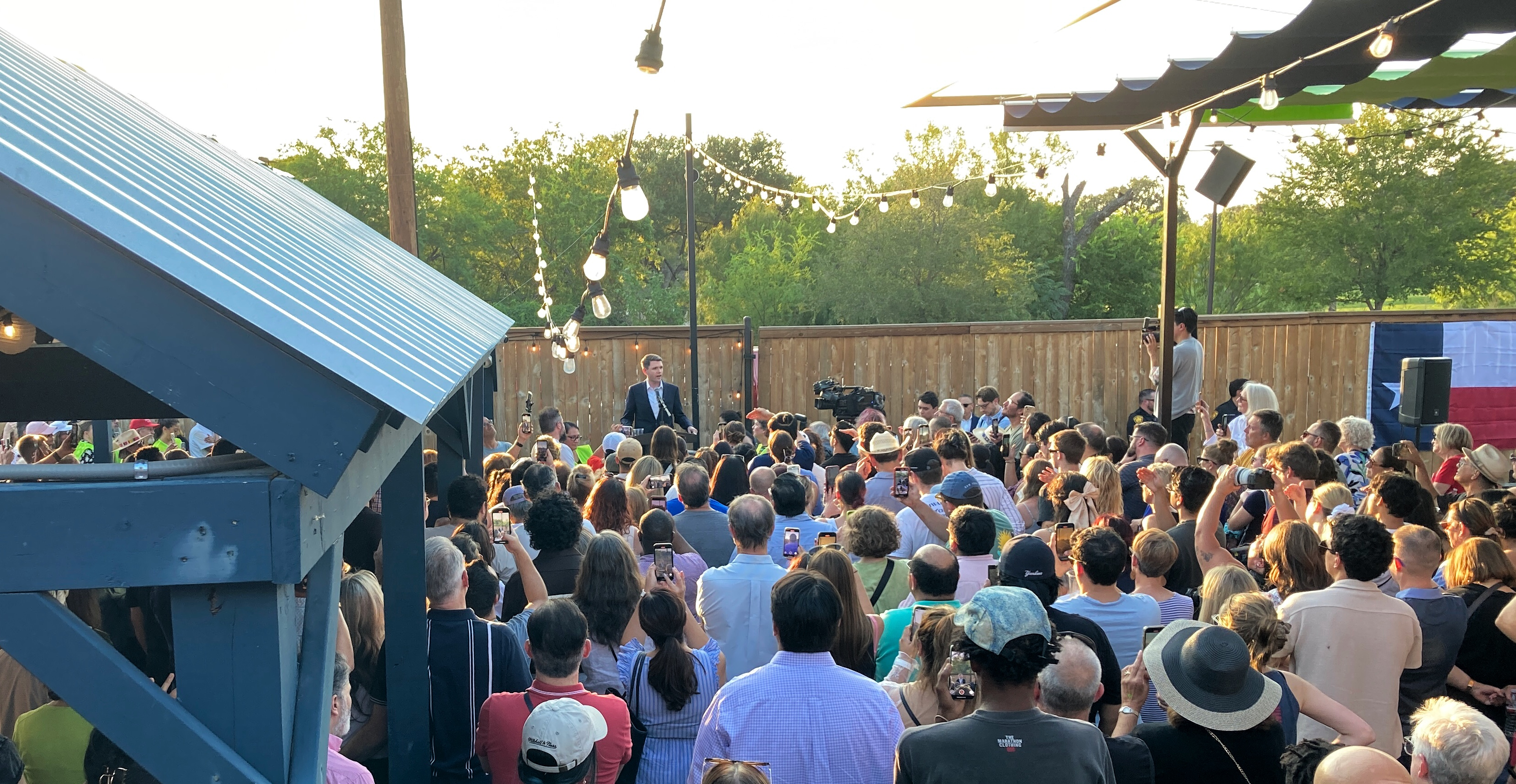
A Talarico rally at The Backyard in San Antonio

On March 3, Talarico won the Democratic primary, securing the party's nomination in the November general election. In the general election, he faced Texas Attorney General Ken Paxton, who won the Republican primary runoff on May 26. Former President Barack Obama appeared at an event with Talarico in May 2026.

In September 2026, Talarico was interviewed on Jimmy Kimmel Live!; after the FCC threatened to apply the equal-time rule, the segment was not aired on television, but was uploaded to YouTube. Talarico's campaign has been targeted by Russian disinformation operation Storm-1516 with deepfake videos on social media platforms.

After Talarico won the nomination, his campaign was noted for its record-breaking fundraising. In the first quarter of 2026, it raised over $27 million, more than any Senate campaign ever for that period, and more than double the totals raised by the two previous Democratic nominees' campaigns in Texas during the same period, with Colin Allred raising $9.5 million in the first quarter of 2024 and Beto O'Rourke raising $6.7 million in 2018. The campaign again set a record for fundraising in the second quarter of 2026 by raising over $30 million, which surpassed the approximately $10 million raised by both O'Rourke and Allred in the same period. The pattern continued into the third quarter as the campaign raised $64 million, the largest quarterly total by a US Senate candidate ever, surpassing the $57 million record set by Jaime Harrison in the 2020 United States Senate election in South Carolina.

Talarico defeated Paxton in the general election, 55% to 43%. He became the first Democrat to win a Texas U.S. Senate seat since Lloyd Bentsen, who was first elected in 1970 and last reelected in 1988. On election night, Luci Baines Johnson, daughter of former Texas Senator and President Lyndon B. Johnson was seen with Talarico, celebrating his victory.

On November 5, Talarico filed FEC paperwork formally declaring his candidacy in Texas's 2032 U.S. Senate election.

On November 7, Talarico appeared on Saturday Night Live during the cold open.

=== Tenure ===
Talarico will assume office on January 3, 2027.

== Political positions ==
Talarico has been described as an economic populist and a progressive who is influenced by Christian social teaching.

=== Cannabis ===
In March 2021, Talarico introduced House Bill 4089 to legalize adult cannabis use and provide for the expungement of past convictions. During the 2025 legislative session, he opposed Senate Bill 3, which sought to ban most hemp-derived THC products, arguing that the ban would undermine the state industry and shift consumers toward unregulated markets.

=== Economic policy ===
In August 2026, Talarico announced a "New American Dream" economic policy agenda. The plan includes repealing tax cuts for the top 1% of earners, closing "billionaire tax loopholes," providing universal childcare and paid family leave, providing down payment assistance for first-time homebuyers, cutting regulations on home building, providing grants to small businesses, an education investment resembling the G.I. Bill, and capping credit card interest rates. He has criticized supply-side economics as trickle-down economics and a "false gospel" and has blamed affordability issues on corruption.

=== Education policy ===
A former public school teacher, Talarico opposed and voted against vouchers for private schools while serving in the Texas House of Representatives. He called Governor Greg Abbott's private school voucher program a "scam" and criticized the lack of a requirement for private schools to provide transportation and special education services in Texas.

Talarico has particularly criticized the cuts that funded therapists at public schools. He cited his experience dealing with a student who was expelled for violent emotional outbursts as a reason therapists were needed, and said the experience inspired him to use his legislative power to ensure there would be resources to help children struggling with their mental health.

=== Energy policy ===
In April 2026, Talarico released an energy plan which proposed investments in oil and gas, nuclear, wind, solar, and geothermal energy and was described as an "all-of-the-above" policy.

In July 2026, Talarico announced a "Hold Data Centers Accountable Plan", which included ending tax incentives for data centers, requiring data centers to pay for infrastructure and grid interconnection costs, requiring data centers to use closed-loop water systems, and allowing communities to approve or reject data center projects in their area. His proposals also included repealing Texas's data center sales tax exemption and establishing minimum federal standards under new development.

He proposed a plan to suspend federal gas and diesel taxes after prices rose due to the 2026 Iran war.

=== Foreign policy ===
Talarico supports a two-state solution to the Israeli–Palestinian conflict. He has condemned what he called Israel's "atrocities in Palestine" and "war crimes", and has criticized its role in the Gaza Strip famine. He opposes offensive U.S. aid to Israel. He supports banning the sale of offensive weapons to Israel. Talarico is a critic of the pro-Israel lobby group AIPAC. In 2025, he criticized Democrats for supporting the Gaza war during the 2024 presidential election. He called the war "the moral test of our time".

Talarico has criticized the 2026 Iran war. After the initial strikes on February 28, he wrote, "No more forever wars" on Twitter. In an interview on The Briefing with Jen Psaki, Talarico said the U.S. could prevent Iran from obtaining nuclear weapons without "bombing innocent schoolchildren", referring to the 2026 Minab school attack. He also called for "immediate negotiations" to end the war. He accused the Trump administration and the Republican Party of using culture wars to divert Americans' attention from other issues, such as the cost of living and the consequences of the release of documents related to Jeffrey Epstein.

In October 2026, Talarico defended U.S. support to Ukraine in the Russo-Ukrainian war, saying: "In some ways, I see this as a cost-saving measure. If we can stop Vladimir Putin in Ukraine, then we're not going to have to stop him elsewhere."

=== Healthcare ===
Talarico supports healthcare reform and universal healthcare as a human right. He supports making buy-in Medicare or a public health insurance option available to every American, calling his healthcare plan "Medicare for Y'all".

In August 2026, Talarico unveiled a healthcare plan focused on breaking up vertically integrated healthcare companies, including pharmacy benefit managers, insurance companies, and hospital networks. The proposal included measures to increase transparency in pharmacy benefit manager pricing, encourage the development and approval of generic drugs, and cap out-of-pocket healthcare costs.

=== Immigration ===
In February 2026, Talarico said he supported the Dignity Act, a proposed bipartisan immigration reform bill. In a January 2026 debate, he called for the increase in funding for ICE during the Trump administration to be diverted to other services. Talarico has described himself as a "border security Democrat" and criticized former President Joe Biden's border policy, saying it "created chaos in our border communities".

=== Institutional reform ===
During his 2026 Senate campaign, Talarico has pledged to reject corporate political action committee contributions and advocated overturning Citizens United v. FEC, banning super PACs and the use of dark money in elections.

Talarico has proposed institutional reforms including term limits for members of U.S. Congress, banning congressional stock trading, and banning gerrymandering. He supports eliminating the filibuster under the current rules in the U.S. Senate, but supports the talking filibuster. He has advocated for reform of the U.S. Supreme Court including through term limits. He supports an enforceable code of ethics for the court's justices, "for recusals, financial disclosures, and limitations on accepting gifts". He said he is "open" to increasing the number of justices.

=== Social issues ===
In 2022, Talarico proposed a constitutional amendment that would prevent the Texas Legislature from further restricting abortion access. In 2025, he proposed an amendment prohibiting legislative restrictions on abortion and related healthcare people choose in consultation with licensed physicians.

Talarico supports legal abortion. In 2025, Talarico said he would support the Equality Act if elected, and as a representative, Talarico voted against a 2021 Texas bill to ban transgender student-athletes from teams that do not match their sex assigned at birth, and against bills targeting gender-affirming care for minors.

In a 2026 interview with Fox News, he said he opposed trans student-athletes in girls' sports "if it endangers safety or fairness", and said he had voted against the 2021 bill because the legislature did not consider amendments to reduce its scope. Following the interview, Talarico faced scrutiny from LGBTQ rights supporters, who believed that his stances were ambiguous, and that the campaign was distancing itself from his previous pro-LGBTQ sentiment; Talarico's campaign told the Washington Post that he had "not shifted any of his stances". At a fundraising event backed by Equality Texas and Human Rights Campaign, he said the interview had been presented without full context, that he supported trans student-athletes in girls' sports if it did not interfere with safety or fairness, and that politics should not interfere with the decisions of doctors. He has also aired campaign ads saying he opposed gender-affirming surgery for minors.

== Electoral history ==
2018 Texas House of Representatives 52nd district special election (Note: In 2018, Talarico was concurrently elected in the special election and the regular election, so both elections were considered a flipped seat for the Democrats.)
Party	Candidate	Votes	%
Democratic	James Talarico	32,235	50.9
Republican	Cynthia Flores	31,113	49.1
Total votes		63,348	100.0
Democratic gain from Republican			

2018 Texas House of Representatives 52nd district election
Primary election
Party	Candidate	Votes	%
Democratic	James Talarico	7,499	100.0
Total votes		7,499	100.0
General election
Democratic	James Talarico	36,798	51.7
Republican	Cynthia Flores	34,340	48.3
Total votes		71,138	100.0
Democratic gain from Republican			

2020 Texas House of Representatives 52nd district election
Primary election
Party	Candidate	Votes	%
Democratic	James Talarico (incumbent)	17,888	100.0
Total votes		17,888	100.0
General election
Democratic	James Talarico (incumbent)	50,520	51.5
Republican	Lucio Valdez	47,611	48.5
Total votes		98,131	100.0
Democratic hold			

2022 Texas House of Representatives 50th district election
Primary election
Party	Candidate	Votes	%
Democratic	James Talarico (incumbent)	9,117	78.5
Democratic	David Alcorta	2,497	21.5
Total votes		11,614	100.0
General election
Democratic	James Talarico (incumbent)	36,881	76.9
Republican	Victor Johnson	9,718	20.3
Libertarian	Ted Brown	1,392	2.9
Total votes		47,991	100.0
Democratic hold			

2024 Texas House of Representatives 50th district election
Party	Candidate	Votes	%
Democratic	James Talarico (incumbent)	8,015	84.4
Democratic	Nathan Boynton	1,478	15.6
Total votes		9,493	100.0
General election
Democratic	James Talarico (incumbent)	48,289	100.0
Total votes		48,289	100.0
Democratic hold			

2026 United States Senate election in Texas Democratic primary
Party	Candidate	Votes	%
Democratic	James Talarico	1,216,412	52.4
Democratic	Jasmine Crockett	1,071,900	46.2
Democratic	Ahmad Hassan	30,875	1.3
Total votes		2,319,187	100.0

2026 United States Senate election in Texas
Party	Candidate	Votes	%	±%
Democratic	James Talarico	5,445,121	55.1%	+11.2%
Republican	Ken Paxton	4,249,752	43.0%	−10.5%
Libertarian	Ted Brown	190,258	1.9%	+0.1%
Write-in		5,112	0.1%	
Total votes		9,890,243	100.0	
Democratic gain from Republican				

== Notes ==
Party political offices
Preceded by M. J. Hegar	Democratic nominee for U.S. Senator from Texas (Class 2); 2026	Most recent
U.S. Senate
Preceded by John Cornyn	U.S. Senator (Class 2) from Texas; Taking office 2027; Served alongside: Ted Cruz	Elect
Honorary titles
Preceded by Jon Ossoff	Baby of the Senate; Taking office 2027	Designate
