= Jasmine Mooney =

Canadian actress and entrepreneur

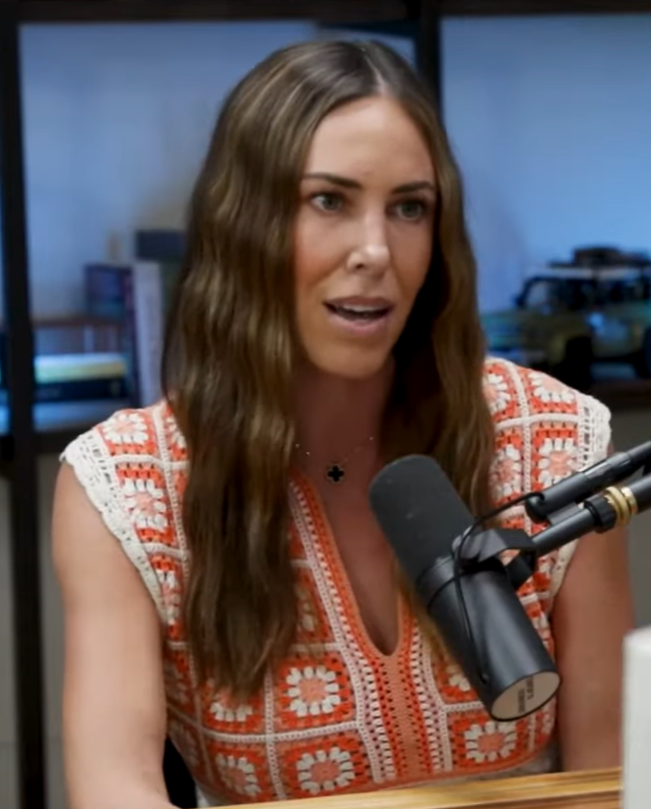
- Mooney in September 2024
- Born: 1989 or 1990 (age 36–37); Yukon, Canada
- Education: British Columbia Institute of Technology
- Occupations: actress; entrepreneur

Jasmine Mooney (born 1989 or 1990) is a Canadian actress and entrepreneur. She is known for a minor role in American Pie Presents: The Book of Love and is the co-founder of a tonic health beverage brand called Holy! Water. She gained widespread media coverage in March 2025 after being arbitrarily detained for twelve days by ICE while travelling in the United States.

== Early life ==
Mooney grew up in Whitehorse, Yukon. In 2008, she moved to Vancouver to study at the British Columbia Institute of Technology.

== Career ==
Mooney's acting debut was a minor role in the 2009 sex comedy film American Pie Presents: The Book of Love, an entry in the American Pie film series. She also appeared in the 2014 film Kid Cannabis, as well as episodes of the television series Loudermilk and iZombie.

In April 2017, Mooney and Ted Wilkie, then the manager at a restaurant called The Parlour, opened a restaurant in Yaletown, British Columbia named Banter Room. Mooney later expanded to the Hotel Belmont and The Basement, both in Vancouver. In September 2019, employees from those establishments launched a complaint about artwork there that they felt was offensive. She has also flipped condominiums and managed Airbnb properties.

Mooney is the co-founder of a brand of tonic health drinks called Holy! Water. She describes Holy! Water as the "only beverage that's ever put ketones, functional mushrooms, adaptogens, and nootropics in a drink". She has described the health and wellness industry as her "true passion".

== Detention in the United States ==
In March 2025, Mooney was travelling from Vancouver to the United States for a health-food convention in Anaheim, California. A U.S. Customs and Border Protection officer informed her that her three-year work visa had been revoked.

On March 3, 2025, Mooney sought to renew her travel authorization and attempted to re-enter the United States through the San Ysidro Port of Entry in San Diego, where she had originally obtained her visa, but was detained and held for three nights at the Otay Mesa Detention Center. She said she lost "so much weight" because the food quality at the detention centre was so poor she refused to eat it. An officer claimed that her permit was revoked because she worked with a company in the US that used hemp, which is an ingredient in Holy! Water.

After three days at the Otay Mesa Detention Center, she was transferred to the San Luis Detention Center in Arizona. She described the conditions of her detention as inhumane. She was kept in a concrete cell with no mats, blankets, and limited bathroom facilities, with around thirty other inmates. She was unable to sleep due to fluorescent lights being kept on at all times. She also became sick, and was forced to reuse one Styrofoam cup and plastic spoon for every meal. She gave an interview with KGTV while still in detention on March 12, and she was released on March 15, after nearly two weeks in detention.

Mooney was not charged with any crime. Her arbitrary detention caused political controversy, with Canadians such as David Eby, the Premier of British Columbia, condemning the incident. Her immigration lawyer stated that the event was part of a wider trend of non-Americans being arbitrarily detained in the United States. Her account of the ordeal was read out by United States Senator Cory Booker during his marathon speech on the Senate floor.
