= Filibuster in the United States Senate =

Legislative tactic

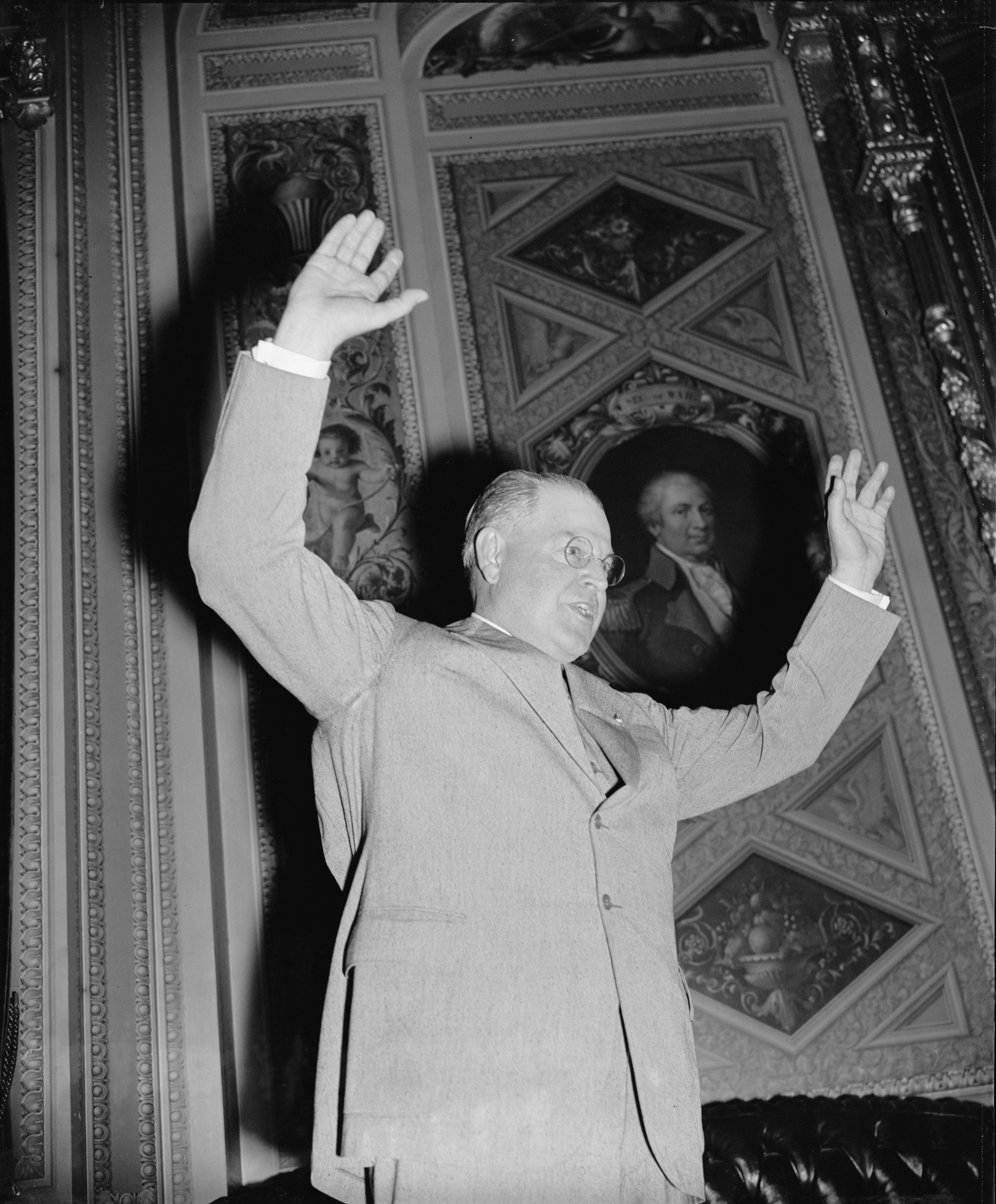
United States Senator Warren Austin speaking during an all night filibuster, July 1939

A filibuster is a tactic used in the United States Senate to delay or block a vote on a measure by preventing debate on it from ending. The Senate's rules place few restrictions on debate. In general, if no other senator is speaking, a senator who seeks recognition is entitled to speak for as long as they wish. Only when debate concludes, whether naturally or using cloture, can the measure be put to a vote.

Rule XXII of the Standing Rules of the United States Senate allows the Senate to vote to limit debate by invoking cloture on the pending question. In most cases this requires three-fifths of the senators duly chosen and sworn (60 votes if there is no more than one vacancy), which means a minority of senators can block a measure, even if it has the support of a simple majority.

Once cloture has been invoked, in most cases debate can continue for a further 30 hours, and most major bills are subject to two or three filibusters before the Senate can vote on passage. Even bills supported by 60 or more senators may therefore be delayed by a filibuster. A filibuster can also be conducted through the use of other delay tactics, such as proposing amendments or making motions.

Throughout the Senate's history, senators have frequently made efforts to curtail the use of the Senate's filibuster. Notably, in 2013 and 2017, the Senate used the "nuclear option" to set a series of precedents that reduced the threshold for cloture on presidential nominations to a simple majority. Since then, nominations can be confirmed without the support of 60 senators, though they may nonetheless also be delayed by a filibuster. A number of rulemaking statutes have been enacted to limit the scope of the filibuster by imposing an automatic time limit on Senate debate of certain questions. These include the Congressional Budget Act of 1974 (which created the budget reconciliation process), the Congressional Review Act and the District of Columbia Home Rule Act. Since debate on such measures ends without cloture being invoked, they are not subject to the 60-vote threshold.

== History ==
=== Constitutional design ===
Only five supermajority requirements were explicitly included in the original United States Constitution, including

- conviction on impeachment (two-thirds of senators present),
- agreeing to a resolution of advice and consent to ratification of a treaty (two-thirds of senators present),
- expelling a member of Congress (two-thirds of members voting in the house in question),
- overriding presidential vetoes (two-thirds of members voting of both houses), and
- proposing constitutional amendments (two-thirds of members voting of both houses).

Through negative textual implication, the Constitution also gives a simple majority the power to set procedural rules.

In Federalist No. 22, Alexander Hamilton described supermajority requirements as being one of the main problems with the previous Articles of Confederation, and identified several evils which would result from such a requirement:

"To give a minority a negative upon the majority (which is always the case where more than a majority is requisite to a decision), is, in its tendency, to subject the sense of the greater number to that of the lesser. ... The necessity of unanimity in public bodies, or something approaching it, has been founded upon a supposition that it would contribute to security. But its real operation is to embarrass the administration, destroy the government's energy, and substitute the pleasure, caprice, or artifices of an insignificant, turbulent, or corrupt junto, to the regular deliberations and decisions of a respectable majority. In those emergencies of a nation, in which the goodness or badness, the weakness or strength of its government, is of the greatest importance, there is commonly a necessity for action. The public business must, in some way or other, go forward. If a pertinacious minority can control the opinion of a majority, respecting the best mode of conducting it, the majority, so that something may be done, must conform to the views of the minority; thus the sense of the smaller number will overrule that of the greater, and give a tone to the national proceedings—hence, tedious delays; continual negotiation and intrigue; contemptible compromises of the public good. And yet, in such a system, it is even happy when such compromises can take place: for upon some occasions things will not admit of accommodation; then the measures of government must be injuriously suspended, or fatally defeated. It is often, by the impracticability of obtaining the concurrence of the necessary number of votes, kept in a state of inaction. Its situation must always savor of weakness, sometimes border upon anarchy."

=== Early use of the filibuster ===
Originally, the Senate's rules did not provide for a procedure for the Senate to vote to end debate on a question so that it could be voted on, which opened the door to filibusters. A filibuster took place at the very first session of the Senate. On September 22, 1789, Senator William Maclay wrote in his diary that the "design of the Virginians ... was to talk away the time, so that we could not get the bill passed."

Although between 1789 and 1806 the Senate's rules provided for a motion for the previous question, this motion was itself debatable, so its effectiveness as a cloture mechanism was limited. Rather, it was used by the Senate to reverse its decision to consider a measure, much like today's motion to postpone. Beginning in 1811, the House of Representatives set a series of precedents to make the previous question a way of limiting debate. Throughout the 19th century, some senators unsuccessfully attempted to introduce this version of the previous question into the Senate's rules.

During most of the pre–Civil War period, the filibuster was seldom used to block measures, as northern senators desired to maintain southern support over fears of disunion and secession, and made compromises over slavery in order to avoid confrontation with new states admitted to the Union in pairs to preserve the sectional balance in the Senate, most notably in the Missouri Compromise of 1820.

One of the early notable filibusters occurred in 1837 when a group of Whig senators filibustered to prevent allies of the Democratic President Andrew Jackson from expunging a resolution of censure against him. In 1841, a defining moment came during a filibuster on a bill to charter a new national bank. After Whig Senator Henry Clay proposed a rules change to limit debate, Democratic Senator William R. King threatened an even longer filibuster, saying that Clay "may make his arrangements at his boarding house for the winter". Other senators sided with King, and Clay backed down.

Narciso Lopez filibustering expeditions to Cuba in the 1850s set the context for the word to employed to connote legislative obstruction on the floor of the US Congress, the word first used in this sense on 3 January 1853 (Fisk and Chemerinsky 1997, 192). In a debate on Cuba, a Democrat, Abraham Venable of North Carolina, denounced filibusters as freebooters who were transforming the United States into "a nation of buccaneers" and the "brigands of the world" (Lazo 2005, 21). Venable crossed party lines to endorse the Whig position of nonintervention, although he argued that should Spain relinquish Cuba the US could acquire it, "but the acquisition should not be achieved through filibustering" 193).

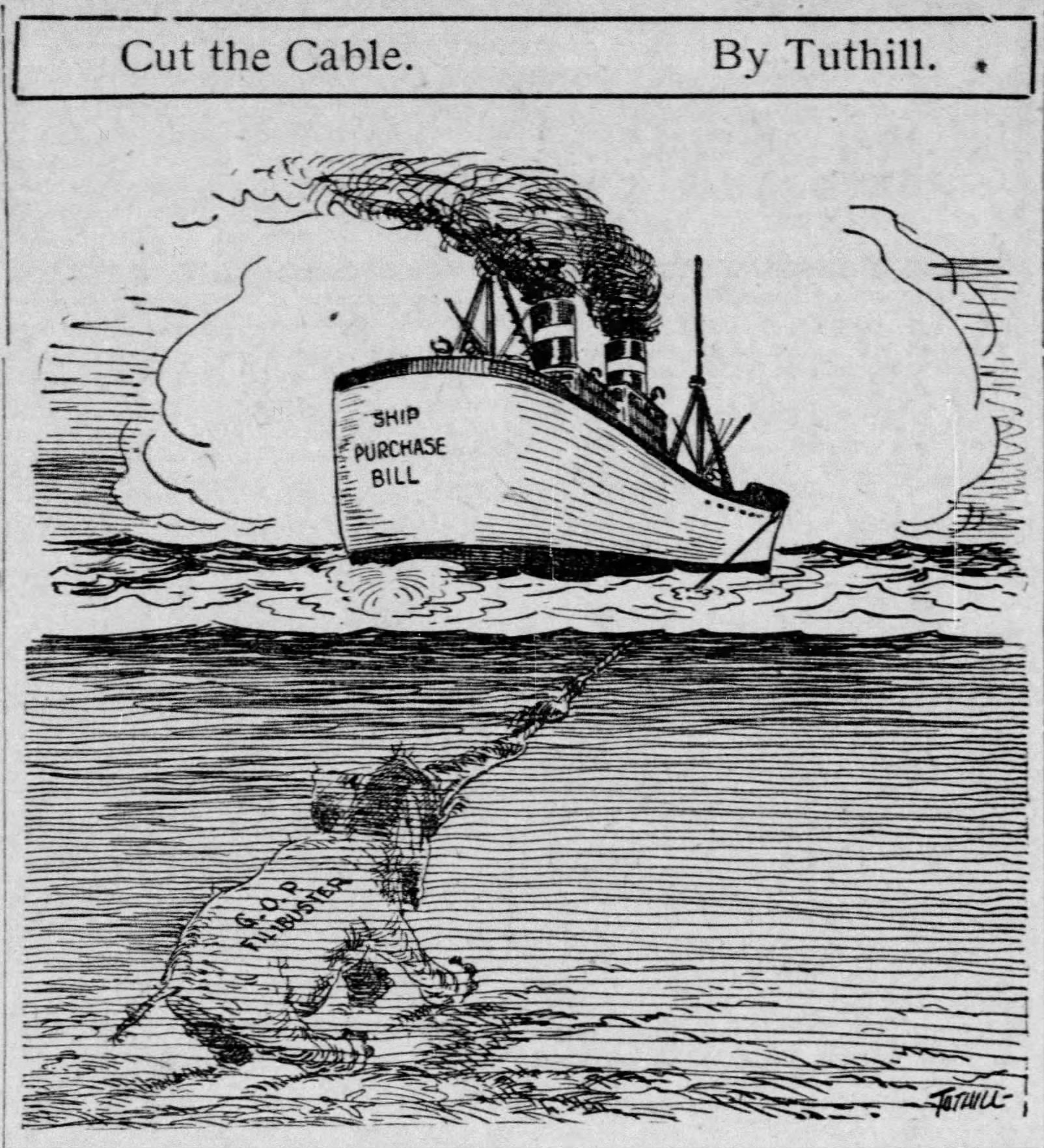
Political cartoon depicting the multiple-day Republican filibuster of the Ship Purchase Act (1915).

=== Emergence of cloture (1917–1969) ===
Headline in The Philadelphia Inquirer of November 16, 1919, reporting the first use of cloture by the United States Senate

In 1917, during World War I, at the urging of President Woodrow Wilson, the Senate adopted a rule by a vote of 76–3 to allow cloture to be used to limit debate on a measure. This took place after a group of twelve anti-war senators managed to kill a bill that would have allowed Wilson to arm merchant vessels in the face of unrestricted German submarine warfare.

Under the new rule, at any time while a measure was pending, a senator could present a cloture motion signed by 16 senators. One hour after the Senate convened on the second calendar day of session following the filing of the cloture motion, the business then pending would be set aside, and the presiding officer would put to the Senate the question, "Is it the sense of the Senate that the debate shall be brought to a close?" If two-thirds of senators present and voting voted in favor of cloture, the measure would become unfinished business to the exclusion of all other business; no dilatory motions or amendments would be allowed; all amendments would be required to have been submitted before the cloture vote; and each senator would be limited to one hour of debate (which must be relevant to the clotured measure).

The first cloture vote occurred in 1919 to end debate on the Treaty of Versailles. Although cloture was invoked, the treaty was then rejected against the wishes of the cloture rule's first champion, President Wilson. In the 1930s, Senator Huey Long of Louisiana used long filibusters to promote his populist policies. He recited Shakespeare and read out recipes for "pot-likkers" during one of his filibusters, which occupied 15 hours of debate.

In 1946, five Democratic senators, John H. Overton, Richard Russell Jr., Millard Tydings, Clyde R. Hoey and Kenneth McKellar, filibustered a bill (S. 101) proposed by Democrat Dennis Chávez that would have created a permanent Fair Employment Practice Committee (FEPC) to prevent discrimination in the workplace. The filibuster lasted weeks, and Senator Chávez was forced to remove the bill from consideration after a failed cloture vote, even though a majority of senators supported the bill. In 1949, in response to filibusters of amendments to the journal and motions to proceed to the consideration of bills, the cloture rule was amended to allow cloture to be filed on "any measure, motion, or other matter pending before the Senate, or the unfinished business". The Senate simultaneously made invoking cloture more difficult by requiring two-thirds of senators duly chosen and sworn to vote in favor of a cloture motion. Future proposals to change the Senate rules were specifically exempted from being subject to cloture.

In 1953, Senator Wayne Morse set a record by filibustering for 22 hours and 26 minutes while protesting the Tidelands oil legislation. Then-Democratic senator Strom Thurmond of South Carolina broke this record in 1957 by filibustering the Civil Rights Act of 1957 for 24 hours and 18 minutes, during which he read laws from different states and recited George Washington's farewell address in its entirety, although the bill ultimately passed. In 1959, anticipating more civil rights legislation, the Senate, under the leadership of Majority Leader Lyndon B. Johnson, restored the cloture threshold to two-thirds of senators present and voting. Although the 1949 rule had eliminated cloture on rules changes themselves, the resolution was not successfully filibustered. On January 5, 1959, the resolution was agreed to by a 72–22 vote. The 1959 change also eliminated the 1949 exemption for amendments to the rules, allowing cloture to once again be invoked on future changes.

One of the most notable filibusters of the 1960s occurred when southern Democrats attempted to block the passage of the Civil Rights Act of 1964 by filibustering for a continuous 75 hours, including a 14-hour-and-13-minute address by Senator Robert Byrd of West Virginia. After 60 days of consideration of the bill, cloture was invoked by a 71–29 vote on June 10, 1964. This was only the second successful cloture vote since 1927. From 1917 to 1970, the Senate took a cloture vote nearly once a year, on average. During this time, there were 49 cloture votes.

=== Two-track system, 60-vote rule, and rise of the routine filibuster (1970–2005) ===
In 1972, after a series of filibusters in the 1960s over civil-rights legislation, the Senate began to use a two-track system introduced under the leadership of Majority Leader Mike Mansfield and Majority Whip Robert Byrd. Before this system was introduced, a filibuster would stop the Senate from moving on to any other legislative activity. Tracking allows the Senate, by unanimous consent, to set aside the measure being filibustered and consider other business. If no senator objects, the Senate can have two or more pieces of legislation or nominations pending on the floor simultaneously by designating specific periods during the day when each one will be considered.

The notable side effect of this change was that by no longer bringing Senate business to a complete halt, filibusters became politically easier for the minority to sustain. As a result, the number of filibusters began increasing rapidly, eventually leading to the modern era in which an effective supermajority requirement exists to pass legislation, with no practical requirement that the minority party actually hold the floor or extend debate. Since then, a measure could be delayed simply by a senator placing a hold on it. In this case, the leadership will generally not attempt to advance the measure unless cloture is invoked on it, usually by a 60-vote majority. In particular, as a courtesy to senators who have holds on a bill or nomination, senators generally suggest the absence of a quorum after they finish their speeches, which has the effect of preventing the presiding officer from putting the pending question to the Senate, even though no senator seeks recognition. This is commonly regarded as the "silent filibuster."

In 1975, the Senate revised its cloture rule so that three-fifths of senators duly chosen and sworn could limit debate, except for measures amending the Standing Rules, on which a two-thirds majority of those present and voting is still needed to invoke cloture. By returning to an absolute number of all senators, rather than a proportion of those present and voting, the change made any filibusters easier to sustain on the floor by a small number of senators from the minority party, without requiring the presence of their minority colleagues. This further reduced the majority's leverage to force an issue through extended debate.

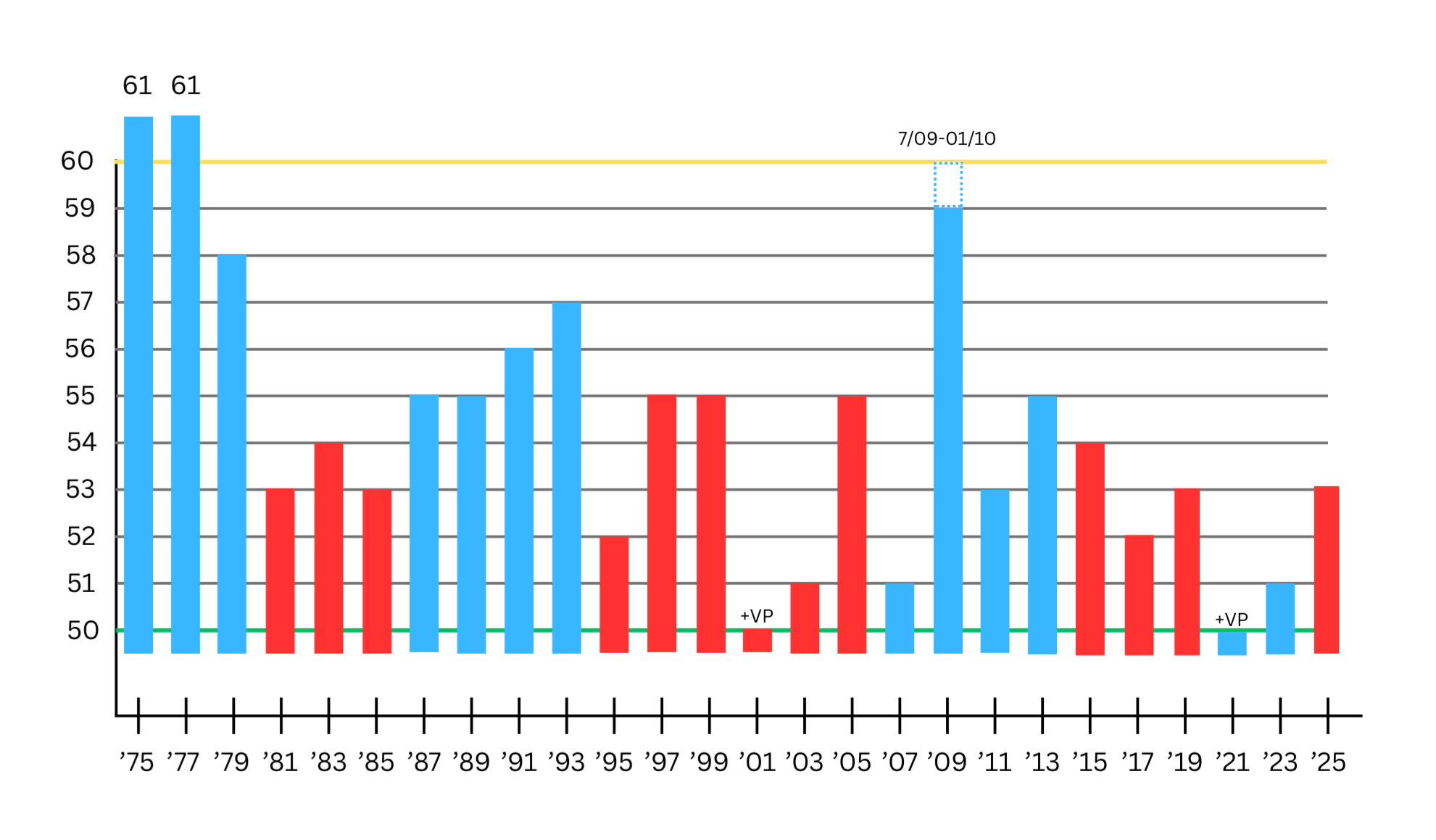
There have only been three filibuster-proof majorities since 1975, when cloture was reduced to 60 votes.

In 1977, during a filibuster on the Natural Gas Policy Act, the Senate set a series of precedents to restrict filibusters after cloture has been invoked. For instance, the Senate held that if cloture has been invoked on a measure, the presiding officer must take the initiative in ruling nongermane amendments out of order.

At first, the only effect of cloture on the time available for debate was to limit each senator to one hour of debate. In 1979, the Senate imposed a 100-hour limit on the total time available for consideration of a clotured measure. The tactic of using points of order to delay legislation because they were not counted as part of the limited time allowed for debate was rendered ineffective by this rule change. In 1986, this time limit was reduced to 30 hours. Generally, motions to proceed are debatable and can be filibustered. However, on March 5, 1980, the Senate voted 54–38 against sustaining a decision of the chair, and thus set a precedent that a nondebatable motion to proceed to executive session to consider a specific nomination (or treaty) is in order. Therefore, nominations can now be brought up without the threat of a filibuster on the motion to proceed.

=== Simple-majority cloture for nominations: (2005–present) ===
In 2005, a group of Republican senators, led by Majority Leader Bill Frist, proposed having the presiding officer rule that a filibuster on judicial nominees was unconstitutional, as it was inconsistent with the president's power to appoint judges with the advice and consent of a simple majority of senators. Senator Trent Lott, the former Republican leader, used the word "nuclear" to describe the plan, and so it became known as the "nuclear option". The term thereafter came to refer to the general process of changing the rules by setting a precedent that conflicted with the plain text of the rules: however, a group of 14 senators—seven Democrats and seven Republicans, collectively dubbed the "Gang of 14"—reached an agreement to temporarily defuse the conflict. From April to June 2010, under Democratic control, the Senate Committee on Rules and Administration held a series of monthly public hearings on the history and use of the filibuster in the Senate. On October 6, 2011, in a further effort to restrict the postcloture filibuster, the Senate voted 51–48 against sustaining a decision of the chair in order to set a precedent that motions to suspend the rules are not in order after cloture has been invoked.

During the 113th Congress, two packages of procedural changes were adopted, one temporary for that Congress and one permanent. Firstly, during the 113th Congress, debate on certain motions to proceed to bills would be limited to four hours, and the minority would be guaranteed the opportunity to offer amendments. Postcloture debate time on district judge nominations was limited to two hours, and postcloture debate time on executive nominations, other than those at Level I of the Executive Schedule, was limited to eight hours. Permanent changes to the Standing Rules of the Senate provided for a simplified cloture procedure for bipartisan motions to proceed and for compound motions to go to conference. Despite these modest changes, 60 votes were still required to overcome a filibuster, and the "silent filibuster"—in which a senator can, in practice, delay a bill even if they leave the floor—remained unaffected.

On November 21, 2013, Senate Democrats used the nuclear option, voting 52–48 to overrule a decision of the chair and set the cloture threshold for all nominations, other than those to the Supreme Court of the United States, at a simple majority of senators present and voting. All Republicans and three Democrats voted in favor of sustaining the decision of the chair. The Democrats' stated motivation was what they saw as an expansion of filibustering by Republicans during the Obama administration, especially with respect to nominations for the United States Court of Appeals for the District of Columbia Circuit, and out of frustration with filibusters of executive branch nominees for agencies such as the Federal Housing Finance Agency.

On April 6, 2017, Senate Republicans eliminated the sole exception to the 2013 change by invoking the nuclear option to extend the 2013 precedent to include Supreme Court nominees. This was done in order to allow a simple majority to confirm Neil Gorsuch to the Supreme Court. The vote was 52–48 against sustaining the decision of the chair on a point of order raised by Majority Leader Mitch McConnell. 61 Senators from both parties later wrote a letter to Senate leadership, urging them to preserve the filibuster for legislation. In 2019, the Senate voted 51–49 to overturn a ruling of the chair to set a precedent that postcloture debate on nominations—other than those to the Supreme Court of the United States, to the United States courts of appeals and to positions at Level I of the Executive Schedule—is two hours. All Republicans except Senators Susan Collins and Mike Lee voted against sustaining the decision of the chair.

== Procedure for invoking cloture ==
The current procedure for invoking cloture is as follows:

- A minimum of 16 senators must sign a cloture motion that states, "We, the undersigned Senators, in accordance with the provisions of Rule XXII of the Standing Rules of the Senate, do hereby move to bring to a close debate on [the measure]."
- Any senator (generally the majority leader) may present the cloture motion at any time (including while another senator is speaking) while the question to which the cloture motion is directed is pending.
- The Senate then often moves on to other business.
- One hour after the Senate convenes on the second calendar day of session following the filing of the cloture motion (or at a time designated by unanimous consent), the cloture motion ripens, and the presiding officer directs the clerk to report the cloture motion.
- The presiding officer directs the clerk to call the roll to ascertain the presence of a quorum. In practice, this mandatory quorum call is almost always waived by unanimous consent.
- The presiding officer puts to the Senate the question, "Is it the sense of the Senate that debate on [the measure] shall be brought to a close?"
- The Senate votes on the cloture motion by the yeas and nays. A majority of three-fifths of senators duly chosen and sworn (60 votes if there is no more than one vacancy in the Senate) is required for most questions. A two-thirds majority of senators present and voting is required to invoke cloture on a motion or resolution to amend the Standing Rules of the Senate. Under the precedents set by the Senate on November 21, 2013, and April 6, 2017, a simple majority of senators present and voting is required to invoke cloture on nominations.

After cloture is invoked, the Senate automatically proceeds to consider the measure on which cloture was invoked (if it was not before the Senate already). The following restrictions then apply:

- The clotured measure remains the unfinished business to the exclusion of all other business until disposed of.
- No senator may speak for more than one hour. A senator may yield part or all of their one hour to a floor manager or leader, who may in turn yield that time to other senators. (No manager nor leader may have more than two hours yielded to them by another senator.)
- The two-speech rule does not apply.
- Senators may yield back part or all of their one hour; however, this yielding does not reduce the total time available for consideration of the measure.
- No senator may propose more than two amendments until every senator has had the opportunity to do the same.
- No amendment may be proposed unless it had been submitted in writing to the journal clerk by 1 o'clock p.m. on the day following the filing of the cloture motion in the case of a first-degree amendment or one hour prior to the beginning of the cloture vote in the case of a second-degree amendment.
- All amendments must be germane.
- Senators may continue to offer amendments even if their time for debate has expired.
- No dilatory motions or quorum calls are in order.
- After 30 hours of debate on the measure, the presiding officer puts the question on any pending amendments and the clotured measure. (Under the precedent set on April 3, 2019, postcloture time on all nominations, other than those to the Supreme Court of the United States, those to the United States courts of appeals and those to a position at Level I of the Executive Schedule, is two hours.)
- Once postcloture time has expired, the only motions in order to be offered are motions to reconsider and motions to table. One quorum call may also be demanded by a senator. Any senator who has not used nor yielded back ten minutes is guaranteed such time to speak to the measure.

Under rule XXII, paragraph 3, added on January 24, 2013, a cloture motion signed by 16 senators (including the majority leader, minority leader, 7 other majority senators and 7 other minority senators) presented on a motion to proceed ripens one hour after the Senate convenes on the following calendar day. If cloture is invoked, the motion to proceed is not debatable. Under rule XXVIII, paragraph 2, added on January 24, 2013, a cloture motion on a compound motion to go to conference ripens two hours after it is filed. If cloture is invoked, the compound motion is not debatable.

== Institutional effects ==
The modern-era filibuster—and the resulting 60-vote supermajority requirement—has had significant policy and political effects on all three branches of the federal government.

=== Frequency of filibusters ===
Cloture voting in the United States Senate since 1917 View source data.

As the filibuster has evolved from a rare practice that required holding the floor for extended periods into a routine 60-vote supermajority requirement, Senate leaders have increasingly used cloture motions as a regular tool to manage the flow of business, often even in the absence of a threatened filibuster. Thus, the presence or absence of cloture attempts is not necessarily a reliable indicator of the presence or absence of a threatened filibuster. Because filibustering does not depend on the use of any specific rules, whether a filibuster is present is always a matter of judgment.

=== Congress ===
The supermajority rule has made it very difficult, often impossible, for Congress to pass controversial legislation in recent decades. The number of bills passed by the Senate has significantly decreased: in the 85th Congress, over 25% of all bills introduced in the Senate were eventually enacted; by 2005, that number had fallen to 12.5%; and by 2010, only 2.8% of introduced bills became law—a 90% decline from 50 years prior.

During times of unified party control, majorities have attempted to enact their major policy priorities through the budget reconciliation process, resulting in legislation constrained by narrow budgetary rules. Meanwhile, public approval for Congress as an institution has fallen to its lowest levels ever, with large segments of the public seeing the institution as ineffective.

Shifting majorities of both parties—and their supporters—have often been frustrated as major policy priorities articulated in political campaigns are unable to obtain passage following an election. Despite the Democratic Party holding a substantial majority in the 111th Congress, the "public option" provision in the Affordable Care Act was removed because one senator—Joe Lieberman of Connecticut—threatened to filibuster the bill if it remained.

=== Presidency ===
Presidents of both parties have increasingly filled the policymaking vacuum with expanded use of executive power, including executive orders in areas that had traditionally been handled through legislation. For example, Barack Obama effected major changes in immigration policy by issuing work permits to some undocumented workers, while Donald Trump issued several significant executive orders after taking office in 2017, along with undoing many of Obama's initiatives. As a result, policy in these areas is increasingly determined by executive preference, and is more easily changed after elections, rather than through more permanent legislative policy.

=== Judiciary ===
The Supreme Court's caseload has declined significantly, with various commenters suggesting that the decline in major legislation has been a major cause. Meanwhile, more policy issues are resolved judicially without action by Congress—despite the existence of potential simple majority support in the Senate—on topics such as the legalization of same-sex marriage.

== Impact on major policy initiatives ==
The implied threat of a filibuster—and the resulting 60-vote requirement in the modern era—has had major impacts on the ability of recent majorities to enact their top legislative priorities into law. The effects of the 60-vote requirement are most apparent in periods where the president and both houses of Congress are controlled by the same political party.

=== Bill Clinton ===
In the 103rd Congress, President Bill Clinton enjoyed Democratic majorities in both chambers of Congress. However, the Clinton health care plan of 1993, formulated by a task force led by First Lady Hillary Clinton, was unable to pass, in part due to the filibuster and the limitations of budget reconciliation. As early as April 1993, a memo to the task force noted, "While the substance is obviously controversial, there is apparently great disquiet in the Capitol over whether we understand the interactivity between reconciliation and health, procedurally, and in terms of timing and counting votes for both measures."

=== George W. Bush ===
In 2001, President George W. Bush was unable to obtain sufficient Democratic support for his tax cut proposals. As a result, the Bush tax cuts of 2001 and 2003 were each passed using reconciliation, which required that the tax cuts expire within the 10-year budget window to avoid violating the Byrd rule in the Senate. The status of the tax cuts would remain unresolved until the late 2012 "fiscal cliff," with a portion of the cuts being made permanent by the American Taxpayer Relief Act of 2012.

=== Barack Obama ===
In the 111th Congress, President Barack Obama briefly enjoyed an effective 60-vote Democratic majority (including independents caucusing with the Democrats) in the Senate. During that time period, the Senate passed the Patient Protection and Affordable Care Act (ACA), commonly known as "Obamacare", on December 24, 2009, by a vote of 60–39 (after invoking cloture by the same margin). However, Obama's proposal to create a public health insurance option was removed from the health care legislation because it could not command 60-vote support.

House Democrats did not approve of all aspects of the Senate bill, but after 60-vote Senate control was permanently lost in February 2010 due to the election of Scott Brown to fill the seat of the late Ted Kennedy, House Democrats decided to pass the Senate bill intact, and it became law. Several House-desired modifications to the Senate bill—those sufficient to pass scrutiny under the Byrd rule—were then made under reconciliation through the Health Care and Education Reconciliation Act of 2010, which was enacted days later, following a 56–43 vote in the Senate.

The near-60-vote Senate majority that Democrats held throughout the 111th Congress was also critical to passage of other major Obama initiatives, including the American Reinvestment and Recovery Act of 2009 (passed 60–38, with three Republicans voting "Yea"), and the Dodd-Frank Wall Street Reform and Consumer Protection Act (passed 60–39, with three Republicans voting "Yea" and one Democrat voting "Nay"). However, the House-passed American Clean Energy and Security Act, which would have created a cap-and-trade system and established a national renewable electricity standard to combat climate change, never received a Senate floor vote, with Majority Leader Harry Reid saying, "It's easy to count to 60."

=== Donald Trump (first term) ===
In 2017, President Donald Trump and the 115th Congress pursued a strategy to use a reconciliation bill to repeal the Affordable Care Act, followed by another reconciliation bill in the next fiscal year to pass tax reform. A budget reconciliation strategy was pursued since nearly all Democrats were expected to oppose these policies, making a filibuster threat insurmountable due to the 60-vote requirement.

A budget resolution for fiscal year 2017 that included reconciliation instructions for health care reform was agreed to by the Senate by a 51–48 vote on January 12, 2017, and by the House on a 227–198 vote the following day. The House later passed the American Health Care Act of 2017 as a budget reconciliation bill by a vote of 217–213 on May 4, 2017. In July, the Senate Parliamentarian advised that certain provisions of the House bill must be stricken (as extraneous non-budgetary matter) under the Byrd rule before proceeding under reconciliation. Senate Republicans were unable to obtain a simple majority for any health care reconciliation bill before the end of the fiscal year, and the budget resolution expired.

A budget resolution for fiscal year 2017 that included reconciliation instructions for tax reform was agreed to by the Senate by a 51–49 vote on October 19, 2017, and by the House on a 216–212 vote on October 26, 2017. It permitted raising the deficit by $1.5 trillion over ten years. The Senate passed the Tax Cuts and Jobs Act of 2017 by a 51–48 vote on December 20, 2017, with the House passing it by a 224–201 vote later that day. President Trump repeatedly called on Senate Republicans to abolish or reform the filibuster throughout 2017 and 2018.

=== Joe Biden ===
In January 2021, following a shift to a 50–50 Democratic majority supported by Vice President Harris' tie-breaking vote, the legislative filibuster became a sticking point for the adoption of a new organizing resolution when Mitch McConnell, the Senate Minority Leader, threatened to filibuster the resolution unless it included language committing to a 60-vote threshold to invoke cloture. As a result of this delay, committee memberships were held over from the 116th Congress, leaving some committees without a chair, some committees chaired by Republicans, and new senators without committee assignments. After a stalemate that lasted a week, McConnell received assurances from two Democratic senators that they would continue to support the 60-vote threshold. Because of those assurances, on January 25, 2021, McConnell abandoned his threat of a filibuster.

After Senate Republicans filibustered the motion to proceed to the Freedom to Vote Act along party lines on October 20, 2021, President Joe Biden expressed support for reforming or abolishing the filibuster. In June 2021, U.S. Senator Kyrsten Sinema (who, at the time, was a Democrat) expressed her opposition to filibuster reform, claiming that ending the filibuster would lead to "repeated radical reversals in federal policy, cementing uncertainty, deepening divisions, and further eroding Americans’ confidence in our government". On January 20, 2022, the Senate voted 52–48 against overturning a ruling of the chair to block all motions, points of order and amendments to a voting rights bill, which would have allowed a talking filibuster on the bill without any hindrances. Every Republican senator voted against this use of the nuclear option along with Senators Joe Manchin and Sinema.

=== Donald Trump (second term) ===
With a 53-47 Senate majority, Trump's second-term legislative agenda was largely consolidated into a single reconciliation bill, eventually called the One Big Beautiful Bill Act. The bill made permanent many of his first-term tax cuts, greatly increased funding for border and immigration enforcement, and eliminated taxes on tips; budgetary offsets included reducing Medicaid subsidies and eliminating some clean energy funding. Trump also pushed Senate Republicans to pass the Safeguard American Voter Eligibility Act (SAVE America Act) which would have required proof of citizenship for voter registration, but they refused to eliminate the filibuster.

== Proposals for reform ==
In addition to reducing the cloture threshold to a simple majority (either wholly or for certain matters), several procedural alternatives have been proposed to modify or reform the filibuster rule.

=== Talking filibuster ===
Some reformers argue that the filibuster should be returned to its origins, in which senators were required to hold the floor and speak at length to delay a bill. Since obstruction would be more visible, the reform might benefit major bills that the minority "is willing to block covertly but not overtly". For example, a 2012 proposal by Senator Jeff Merkley would require that if between 51 and 59 senators support a cloture motion, debate would continue only until there is no opposing senator speaking. At that point, another cloture vote would be triggered with only a simple majority required.

Senators can prevent the chair from putting the question even if no senator is on the floor, by suggesting the absence of a quorum after their speeches even though a quorum call is not in order if no business has intervened since a quorum was last established. On January 19, 2022, Majority Leader Chuck Schumer raised a point of order with respect to a voting rights bill pending at that time "that no further amendments, motions, or points of order be in order, and that any appeals be determined without debate", a one-time rule change which would have allowed a talking filibuster on the bill without any hindrances. The chair overruled the point of order, and the Senate sustained the decision of the chair by a vote of 52–48, with Senators Manchin and Sinema joining all Republicans in voting against the reform.

=== Gradually lowering the 60-vote threshold ===
In 2013, Senator Tom Harkin (D-IA) advocated for steadily reducing the cloture threshold each time a cloture vote fails. The number of votes required would be reduced by three on each vote (e.g., from 60 to 57, 54, 51) until a simple majority was required. Harkin envisioned that this rule would still allow the minority to bring visibility to and slow down a bill, and since the whole process would take eight days the majority would have incentive to compromise with the minority. The Senate defeated the idea by voice vote in 2013.

=== Population-adjusted threshold ===
John Manning and Matthew Stephenson propose that filibuster could only continue if anti-cloture Senators represent a majority of the national population, limiting the ability of the Senate to delay nationally popular reforms.

=== Minority Bill of Rights ===
As an alternative to blocking the majority's agenda, some proposals have focused instead on granting the minority the right to have its own agenda considered on the floor. For example, in 2004 then–House Minority Leader Nancy Pelosi (D-CA) proposed a "minority bill of rights" for the House of Representatives that would have guaranteed the minority the right to offer its own alternatives to bills under consideration. The House Republican majority did not endorse her proposal, and Pelosi in turn did not grant those rights when Democrats took control of the House in 2007.

== Process for limiting or eliminating the filibuster ==
Senate rules can be changed by a simple majority vote. Nevertheless, under current Senate rules, an amendment to the rules could itself be filibustered, with a vote of two-thirds of the senators present and voting needed to invoke cloture on a measure amending the Standing Rules. Several methods of overcoming this supermajority requirement have been devised.

=== Rules changes at the beginning of a Congress ===
At times, senators have argued that, under Article I, Section 5, of the Constitution, the Senate has a constitutional right to change its rules by a simple majority at the beginning of each Congress. In 1969, at the beginning of the 91st Congress, the Senate voted 51–47 to invoke cloture on a resolution amending the cloture rule, whereupon Vice President Hubert Humphrey declared that cloture had been invoked. The Senate voted 45–53 against sustaining the decision of the chair, thus setting a precedent that there is no exception to the cloture rule at the beginning of a Congress. In 1975, the Senate affirmed by a vote of 53–43 that the ordinary cloture rules apply to rules changes at the beginning of a Congress. The prevailing precedent is, therefore, that the Senate's rules continue from one Congress to another.

=== Standing orders ===
The Senate can also set aside a provision of its Standing Rules by agreeing to a resolution to that effect. 60 votes are required to invoke cloture on such a resolution, so this is a more realistic alternative to an amendment to the rules. On January 25, 2013, the Senate agreed to S.Res. 15 by a vote of 78–16. That resolution established a standing order, for the 113th Congress only, restricting filibusters on motions to proceed and on nominations.

In certain circumstances, debate on a motion to proceed would be limited to four hours, equally divided between the majority and minority leaders or their designees, after which the motion to proceed could be decided by simple-majority vote. Postcloture time on district judges would be limited to two hours, equally divided, and postcloture time on subcabinet executive nominations would be limited to eight hours, equally divided. At the beginning of the equally divided 107th and 117th Congresses, the Senate agreed to S.Res. 8 and S.Res. 27 (respectively). Section 3 of each of those standing orders limited debate on a motion to discharge following a tie vote in committee to four hours, allowing such motions to be decided by a simple majority. Ordinarily, they would be fully debatable unless the Senate voted to invoke cloture by a 60-vote majority.

=== Nuclear option ===
Despite the supermajority requirements described above, any senator may attempt to nullify a Senate rule by raising a point of order that is contrary to the existing rules and precedents. An appeal in connection with a nondebatable question (such as cloture procedure) is itself nondebatable, so there is no need for a supermajority cloture vote.

==== Procedure to invoke the nuclear option ====
The nuclear option was used in 2013, when Majority Leader Harry Reid raised a point of order that "the vote on cloture under rule XXII for all nominations other than for the Supreme Court of the United States is by majority vote". The presiding officer overruled the point of order, and Reid appealed the ruling. Minority Leader Mitch McConnell raised a parliamentary inquiry on how many votes were required to appeal the chair's ruling in that instance. The presiding officer replied, "A majority of those Senators voting, a quorum being present, is required." Reid's appeal was sustained by a 48–52 vote, and the Senate thus established a precedent that cloture on nominations other than those for the Supreme Court requires only a simple majority. Procedurally, the events described went as follows:

Mr. REID. I raise a point of order that the vote on cloture under rule XXII for all nominations other than for the Supreme Court of the United States is by majority vote.
The PRESIDENT pro tempore. Under the rules, the point of order is not sustained.
Mr. REID. I appeal the ruling of the Chair and ask for the yeas and nays.
(48–52 vote on sustaining the decision of the chair)
The PRESIDENT pro tempore. The decision of the Chair is not sustained.
The PRESIDENT pro tempore. *** Under the precedent set by the Senate today, November 21, 2013, the threshold for cloture on nominations, not including those to the Supreme Court of the United States, is now a majority. That is the ruling of the Chair.

A new precedent was thus established allowing for cloture to be invoked by a simple majority on executive nominations, excluding those to the Supreme Court of the United States. On April 6, 2017, Senate Republicans again used the nuclear option to remove the exception for Supreme Court nominations. The nuclear option was again used in 2019 to limit postcloture debate on low-level nominations to two hours.

== Exceptions to the 60-vote rule ==
A number of laws limit the time for debate on certain bills, eliminating the need for cloture and effectively exempting those bills from the 60-vote requirement, allowing the Senate to pass such bills by a simple majority. As a result, many major legislative actions in recent decades have been taken through one of these methods, especially reconciliation. These laws generally provide that after a certain period of time, the committee of jurisdiction shall be discharged (either automatically or by privileged motion) from further consideration of the measure; that a motion to proceed shall be privileged and nondebatable; and that debate on the measure be limited to a certain period of time. 60 votes are needed to invoke cloture on a bill creating such a procedure.

=== Budget reconciliation ===
Budget reconciliation is a procedure created by the Congressional Budget Act of 1974 as part of a reform of the congressional budget process. In brief, the annual budget process begins with adoption of a budget resolution, a concurrent resolution that recommends overall funding levels for the government. Congress may then consider a budget reconciliation bill, subject to expedited procedures in the Senate, that reconciles funding amounts in any annual appropriations bills with the amounts specified in the budget resolution. Under the Congressional Budget Act, a budget resolution is debatable for 50 hours, equally divided and controlled by the majority and minority managers. A reconciliation bill is debatable for 20 hours, equally divided and controlled by the majority and minority managers. First-degree amendments are debatable for two hours. Second-degree amendments are debatable for one hour. After time for general debate has expired, amendments are non-debatable.

Any debatable motions and appeals are debatable for one hour. After time for general debate has expired, such motions are non-debatable. A conference report on a budget resolution or reconciliation bill is debatable for ten hours. The requirement that any amendments be germane also reduces the prospect of a filibuster by amendment. All these restrictions obviate the usual need for cloture. Under the Byrd rule, no non-budgetary "extraneous matter" may be considered in a reconciliation bill. The presiding officer, relying always on the opinion of the Senate parliamentarian, determines whether an item is extraneous, and a 60-vote majority is required either to overrule the decision of the chair or to waive the Byrd rule, and thus include such material in a reconciliation bill. During periods of single-party control in Congress and the Presidency, reconciliation has increasingly been used to enact major parts of a party's legislative agenda by avoiding the 60-vote rule. Notable examples of such successful use include:

- Omnibus Budget Reconciliation Act of 1993, Pub. L. 103–66 (1993)

The Clinton budget bill, passed the Senate 51–50. Raised income taxes on those making over $115,000, among other tax increases.

- Economic Growth and Tax Relief Reconciliation Act of 2001 (EGTRRA), Pub. L. 107–16 (text) (PDF) (2001)

First set of Bush tax cuts, passed the Senate 58–33.

- Jobs and Growth Tax Relief Reconciliation Act of 2003, Pub. L. 108–27 (text) (PDF) (2003)

Accelerated and extended Bush tax cuts, passed the Senate 51–50.

- Deficit Reduction Act of 2005, Pub. L. 109–171 (text) (PDF) (2006)

Slowed growth in Medicare and Medicaid spending and changed student loan formulas, passed the Senate 51–50.

- Tax Increase Prevention and Reconciliation Act of 2005 (TIPRA), Pub. L. 109–222 (text) (PDF) (2006)

Extended lower rates on capital gains and relief from the alternative minimum tax, passed the Senate 54–44.

- Health Care and Education Reconciliation Act of 2010, Pub. L. 111–152 (text) (PDF) (2010)

Second portion of Obamacare, passed the Senate 56–43. This law made budget-related amendments to the main Obamacare law, the Patient Protection and Affordable Care Act which had previously passed with 60 votes. It also included significant student loan changes.

- Tax Cuts and Jobs Act of 2017 (2017)

Trump tax cuts, passed the Senate 51–48.

- American Rescue Plan Act of 2021 (2021)

COVID-19 relief, passed the Senate 50–49

- Inflation Reduction Act of 2022 (2022)

Climate change funding, Medicare prescription drug price negotiations, and creation of a corporate minimum tax, passed the Senate 51–50.

- One Big Beautiful Bill Act (2025)

Extended Trump's first-term tax cuts, funded immigration enforcement, reduced Medicaid subsidies, passed the Senate 51–50.

=== Congressional Review Act ===
The Congressional Review Act, enacted in 1995, allows Congress to review and repeal certain administrative regulations adopted by the executive branch. This procedure will most typically be used successfully shortly after a party change in the presidency. It was first used in 2001 to repeal an ergonomics rule promulgated under Bill Clinton, and was then used 14 times in 2017 to repeal various regulations adopted in the final year of the Barack Obama presidency. In the Senate, if the committee of jurisdiction has not reported a joint resolution providing for congressional disapproval of a rule within 20 days, then the joint resolution can be discharged by a petition signed by 30 senators. A motion to proceed to the joint resolution is then privileged and nondebatable, and debate on the joint resolution itself is then limited to ten hours, equally divided and controlled by the majority and minority managers.

=== District of Columbia Home Rule Act ===
The District of Columbia Home Rule Act, enacted in 1973, allows Congress to repeal laws passed by the Council of the District of Columbia. In the Senate, if a joint resolution of disapproval is introduced within 60 days in the case of a law amending the Criminal Code, or within 30 days in the case of any other law, then if it has not been reported by the committee of jurisdiction after 20 calendar days, a motion to discharge is privileged and debatable for one hour. If that motion is agreed to, a nondebatable motion to proceed is in order. The joint resolution is then debatable for ten hours, equally divided.

=== National Emergencies Act ===
The National Emergencies Act, enacted in 1976, formalizes the emergency powers of the president. In the Senate, if a joint resolution terminating a national emergency has not been reported by the committee of jurisdiction within 15 calendar days, then the committee is automatically discharged and the joint resolution immediately becomes the pending business, thus preventing a filibuster on the motion to proceed. Consideration of the joint resolution is then time-limited to three days (whether the Senate is actively debating the joint resolution or not), after which the Senate must vote on passage of the joint resolution.

=== War Powers Resolution ===
The War Powers Resolution, enacted in 1973 over Richard Nixon's veto, generally requires the President to withdraw troops committed overseas within 60 days, which the President may extend once for 30 additional days, unless Congress has declared war, otherwise authorized the use of force, or is unable to meet as a result of an armed attack upon the United States.

In the Senate, if a concurrent resolution authorizing forces, or requiring that forces be removed, has not been reported by the committee of jurisdiction within 15 calendar days, then the committee is discharged and the concurrent resolution immediately becomes the pending business, thus preventing a filibuster on the motion to proceed. Consideration of the concurrent resolution is then time-limited to three days (whether the Senate is actively debating the resolution or not), after which the Senate must vote on agreeing to the concurrent resolution.

The War Powers Resolution provides for the use of concurrent resolutions, which are not subject to approval by the president. Following the Supreme Court's decision in INS v. Chadha, which ruled that the legislative veto was unconstitutional, doubt has arisen as to whether this course of action is constitutional. In response, in 1983, Congress amended the International Security Assistances and Arms Export Control Act of 1976 to provide for expedited procedures in the Senate for joint resolutions directing the president to remove forces.

If the committee of jurisdiction has not reported such a joint resolution within ten days of its introduction, then a motion to discharge the committee is privileged and debatable for one hour. If that motion is agreed to, a motion to proceed is privileged and is nondebatable. Then, debate on the joint resolution is limited to ten hours, equally divided. Such joint resolutions are not privileged in the House, and are subject to the president's approval or veto.

=== Trade promotion authority ===
Beginning in 1975 with the Trade Act of 1974, and later through the Trade Act of 2002 and the Trade Preferences Extension Act of 2015, Congress has from time to time provided so-called "fast track" authority for the President to negotiate international trade agreements. After the president submits a bill implementing a trade agreement, Congress can approve or deny the agreement, but cannot amend the bill. In both the House and the Senate, if the bill is not reported by the committee of jurisdiction within 45 session days, the committee is automatically discharged. A motion to proceed to the bill is then privileged and nondebatable. Debate on the bill is then limited to 20 hours, equally divided.

=== Debt limit ===
In December 2021, the Senate passed S. 610 by a vote of 59–35 (after first invoking cloture by a vote of 64–36), which would allow the Senate to consider, under expedited procedures, one joint resolution in a specified form raising the debt limit. After the majority leader introduced such a joint resolution, the joint resolution would be placed on the Calendar, and a motion to proceed would be nondebatable. The joint resolution would be debatable for ten hours, equally divided. After S.610 was signed into law, the Senate considered and passed S.J.Res. 33 under these expedited procedures. This structure allowed Republican senators to vote against the debt limit increase without blocking its passage.

== Other forms of filibuster ==
While extended debate is the traditional form of a filibuster in the Senate, other means of delaying and killing legislation are available. Because the Senate routinely conducts business by unanimous consent, one member can create at least some delay, and in many cases effectively kill a measure, by objecting to the request. In many cases, an objection to a request for unanimous consent will compel a vote of one kind or another, perhaps requiring cloture.

While forcing a single vote may not be an effective delaying tool, the cumulative effect of several votes, which take at least 15 minutes apiece (in practice, most take 45 minutes), can be substantial. If a senator announces to their leadership that they intend to object to a request (known as a hold), the majority leader will not attempt to make that request even if the senator does not come to the floor to object to it; a single senator's objection is therefore enough to force a lengthy cloture process.

The most effective methods of delay are those that force the majority to invoke cloture multiple times on the same measure. The most common example is to filibuster the motion to proceed to a bill, then filibuster the bill itself. This forces the majority to go through the entire cloture process twice in a row. If, as is common, the majority seeks to adopt a substitute amendment to the bill, a further cloture procedure is needed for the amendment if the amendment is not germane. In addition to objecting to routine requests, senators can make various dilatory motions, such as motions to adjourn.

Quorum calls are meant to establish the presence or absence of a quorum, but senators routinely use them to waste time while waiting for the next speaker to come to the floor or for leaders to negotiate off the floor. As a courtesy to other senators, senators suggest the absence of a quorum after their speeches even if no business has intervened since a quorum was established. This prevents the chair from fulfilling their duty to put the pending question to a vote and means that senators do not need to hold the floor to filibuster a measure. When the next senator arrives on the floor, the senator asks unanimous consent to dispense with the quorum call.

=== Motions to go to conference ===
The Senate was previously particularly vulnerable to serial filibusters when it and the House had passed different versions of the same bill and want to go to conference (i.e., appoint a conference committee of both chambers to merge the bills). Normally, the majority would ask for unanimous consent to:

- Insist on the Senate amendments, or disagree with the House amendments
- Request, or agree to a request for, a conference
- Authorize the presiding officer to appoint conferees

If the minority objects, those motions are debatable, and therefore subject to a filibuster. After the first two motions are agreed to, but before the third is, senators can offer an unlimited number of motions to instruct conferees, which are themselves debatable, amendable and divisible. As a result, a determined minority could previously cause a great deal of delay before a conference. In 2013, the Senate amended its rules to allow these three motions to be made together as a compound motion and to provide an expedited cloture procedure on this compound motion. Therefore, this is no longer a viable filibuster tactic.

== Longest solo filibusters ==
Below is a table of the ten longest single-person filibusters to take place in the United States Senate since 1900. In what became known as "Cory Booker's marathon speech", Senator Cory Booker (D-NJ) conducted a speech lasting 25 hours and 5 minutes from March 31, 2025, to April 1, 2025. This is the longest solo speech in Senate history, but is not considered a filibuster as no specific legislation was under consideration when the speech was conducted.

Longest filibusters in the U.S. Senate since 1900
	Senator	Party	Date (began)	Measure/Motive	Duration (hh:mm)
1	Strom Thurmond (SC)	Democratic	August 28, 1957	Civil Rights Act of 1957 (filibuster)	24:18
2	Al D'Amato (NY)	Republican	October 17, 1986	Defense Authorization Act (1987), amendment	23:30
3	Wayne Morse (OR)	Independent	April 24, 1953	Submerged Lands Act (1953)	22:26
4	Ted Cruz (TX)	Republican	September 24, 2013	Continuing Appropriations Act (2014) (filibuster)	21:18
5	Robert M. La Follette, Sr. (WI)	Republican	May 29, 1908	Aldrich–Vreeland Act (1908)	18:23
6	William Proxmire (WI)	Democratic	September 28, 1981	Debt ceiling increase (1981)	16:12
7	Huey Long (LA)	Democratic	June 12, 1935	National Industrial Recovery Act (1933), amendment	15:30
8	Jeff Merkley (OR)	Democratic	April 4, 2017	Supreme Court confirmation of Neil Gorsuch (2017) (filibuster)	15:28
9	Al D'Amato (NY)	Republican	October 5, 1992	Revenue Act (1992), amendment	15:14
10	Chris Murphy (CT)	Democratic	June 15, 2016	Nominally H.R. 2578; supporting gun control measures (filibuster)	14:50

== In media ==
- Mr. Smith Goes to Washington, a 1939 film in which a filibuster is a major plot element
- Parks and Recreation (season 6), where Leslie Knope filibusters a council vote in episode 6.
- Scandal (season 5), where Mellie Grant filibusters a Senate vote in episode 9.
- The West Wing (season 2), where Howard Stackhouse filibusters a Senate vote in episode 17.

== See also ==
- Blue slip
- Magic minute
- Senate hold
- Senatorial courtesy
- Reconciliation (United States Congress)
- Reform of the Senate
