= Texas's 52nd House of Representatives district =

American legislative district

Texas's 52nd State House of Representatives district
Representative
Caroline Harris Davila; R–Round Rock
- Demographics: 54.0% White; 9.2% Black; 25.3% Hispanic; 10.2% Asian
- Population (2020) • Voting age: 201,532; 144,897

The Texas House of Representatives 52nd district represents eastern and central Williamson County. The current representative is Caroline Harris Davila, who was elected in 2022.

In the 2026 Texas House of Representatives election, Chris Jimenez defeated Davila to become the Representative-elect. Jimenez's win was a flip to the Democratic Party.

Major cities in this district include parts of Round Rock, Georgetown, Taylor, Hutto, and Leander.

== List of representatives ==
- James Talarico from 2018 until 2022, when he sought and won election in the 50th district due to 2021 redistricting according to the 2020 United States census.
- Caroline Harris Davila
