= Taylor Press =

- Type: Twice-weekly newspaper
- Format: Broadsheet
- Owner(s): Granite Media Partners
- Founder(s): Howard Bland
- Publisher: Jason Chlapek
- Editor: Jason Chlapek
- Founded: 1913
- Headquarters: 211 W. Third Street; Taylor, Texas 76574; US
- Circulation: 1,457 (as of 2024)
- Website: taylorpress.net

The Taylor Press is a community newspaper published in Taylor, Texas, serving East Williamson County as the legal newspaper for several communities. It has an online edition, a website and a Facebook page. The Taylor Press calls itself "the Media Gateway to East WilCo".

Founded by Howard Bland, it was published as Taylor Daily Press from 1959 to 1974 by Frank Mayborn, the late publisher of the Temple Daily Telegram and the Killeen Daily Herald.
