= 1994 Texas gubernatorial election =

- November 8, 1994
- Turnout: 50.87%
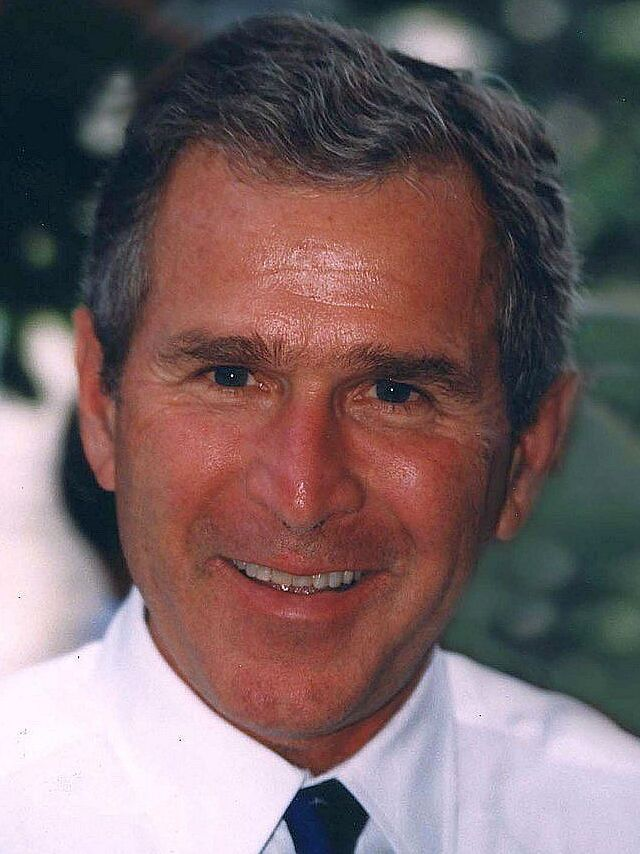

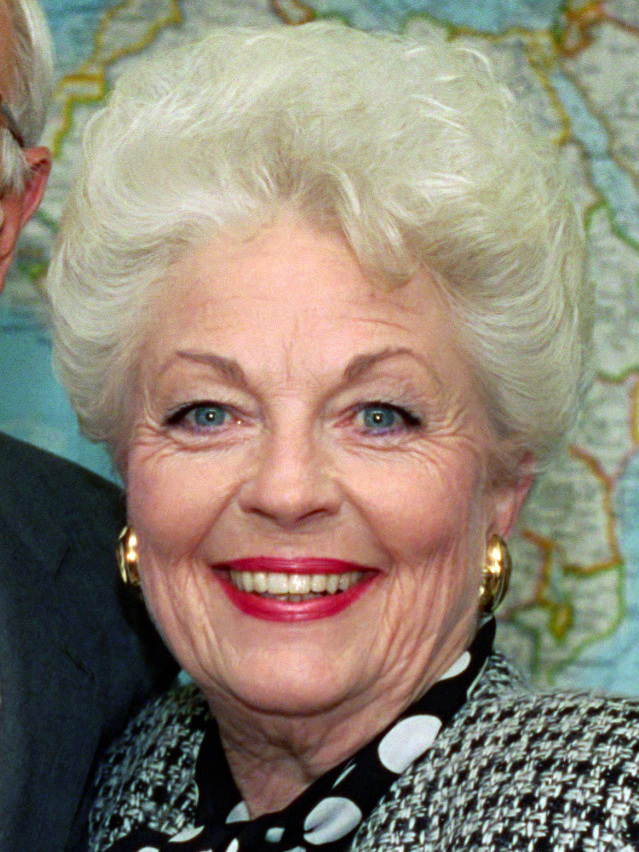
| Nominee | George W. Bush | Ann Richards |
| Party | Republican | Democratic |
| Popular vote | 2,350,994 | 2,016,928 |
| Percentage | 53.48% | 45.88% |
- County results Bush: 40–50% 50–60% 60–70% 70–80% 80–90% Richards: 40–50% 50–60% 60–70% 70–80% 80–90%
Governor before election
Ann Richards
Democratic
Elected Governor
George W. Bush
Republican

The 1994 Texas gubernatorial election was held on November 8, 1994, to elect the governor of the U.S. state of Texas. Incumbent Democratic Governor Ann Richards was defeated in her bid for re-election by Republican nominee and future president George W. Bush, the son of former President George H. W. Bush.

Before the election, Richards had a high approval rating due to the strength of the state economy. However, Bush's campaigning on cultural and religious issues resonated with many Texan voters, and the race was considered a tossup on election day.

On election day, Bush carried 188 of the state's 254 counties, while Richards carried 66. Despite the loss of Richards, the Democratic Party was more successful in other statewide offices: Lieutenant Governor Bob Bullock, Attorney General Dan Morales, Land Commissioner Garry Mauro and Comptroller John Sharp all won reelection. The Democrats would not win statewide office in Texas again until Gina Hinojosa was elected Governor in 2026. Bush's victory was one of the most notable in the 1994 Republican Revolution, as he was one of four candidates to defeat an incumbent governor that cycle. This was, until 2026, the last time an incumbent governor of Texas lost re-election.

== Primaries ==
=== Republican ===
Republican primary
| Party | Candidate | Votes | % | ±% |
|---|---|---|---|---|
| Republican | George W. Bush | 520,130 | 93.32% | +93.32% |
| Republican | Ray Hollis | 37,210 | 6.68% | +6.68% |
| Total votes | | 557,340 | 100.00% | |

=== Democratic ===
Democratic primary
| Party | Candidate | Votes | % | ±% |
|---|---|---|---|---|
| Democratic | Ann Richards (incumbent) | 806,607 | 77.79% | +20.70% |
| Democratic | Gary Espinosa | 230,337 | 22.21% | +22.21% |
| Total votes | | 1,036,944 | 100.00% | |

== Campaign ==
On June 11, 1994, 54 delegates met at the Libertarian state convention to statewide nominees. Keary Ehlers was given the gubernatorial nomination, and the other statewide nominees were selected on June 12. Tom Pauken, the chairman of the Republican Party of Texas, stated that Keary Ehlers should withdraw to help Bush win the election. Jay Manifold, the chairman of the Libertarian Party of Texas, stated that Bush should withdraw to help Ehlers win the election in response.

=== Polling ===
| Source | Date | George W. Bush (R) | Ann Richards (D) |
|---|---|---|---|
| KPRC-TV | November 4, 1994 | 48% | 44% |
| Dallas Morning News/Houston Chronicle | October 30 – November 3, 1994 | 47% | 44% |
| Houston Post/KHOU-TV | November 2, 1994 | 44% | 47% |
| KPRC-TV | October 23, 1994 | 47% | 44% |
| Houston Post/KHOU-TV | October 7, 1994 | 43% | 41% |

=== Endorsements ===
Bush endorsements

Organizations

- Associated Builders and Contractors of Texas
- Coalition for a Safer Society
- Concerned Insurance Texas Agents
- Justice for All
- Texas Association of Business
- Texas Association of Dairymen
- Texas Cattle Feeders Association
- Texas Cotton Ginners Association
- Texas Farm Bureau Friends of Agriculture
- Texas Forestry Association

Newspapers

- The Bryan-College Station Eagle
- The Dallas Morning News
- Denton Record-Chronicle
- Gainesville Daily Register
- Houston Chronicle
- Lubbock Avalanche-Journal
- Midland Reporter-Telegram
- Times Record News
- The Victoria Advocate

Notable individuals

- Billy Joe DuPree, former Dallas Cowboys receiver
- Nolan Ryan, former Texas Rangers pitcher
Richards endorsements

Organizations

- Austin Progressive Coalition
- Combined Law Associations of Texas
- Sierra Club
- Texas AFL–CIO
- Texas National Organization for Women
- Texas State Teachers Association

Newspapers

- Amarillo Globe-News
- Austin American-Statesman
- Corpus Christi Caller-Times
- Fort Worth Star-Telegram
- Galveston Daily News
- Houston Post
- Killeen Daily Herald
- Longview News-Journal
- The Marshall News Messenger
- San Angelo Standard-Times
- San Antonio Express-News
- Temple Daily Telegram
- Waco Tribune-Herald

Notable individuals

- Ross Perot, independent presidential candidate in the 1992 presidential election
Ehlers endorsements

Organizations

- North Texas Arms Rights Coalition

=== Debate ===
1994 Texas gubernatorial election debate
| No. | Date | Host | Moderator | Link | Democratic | Republican |
| Key: P Participant A Absent N Not invited I Invited W Withdrawn | | | | | | |
| Key: P Participant A Absent N Not invited I Invited W Withdrawn | | | | | Ann Richards | George W. Bush |
|---|---|---|---|---|---|---|
| 1 | Oct. 21, 1994 | KERA-TV | | C-SPAN | P | P |

== Results ==
General election results
| Party | Candidate | Votes | % | ±% |
|---|---|---|---|---|
| Republican | George W. Bush | 2,350,994 | 53.48% | ▲6.56 |
| Democratic | Ann Richards (incumbent) | 2,016,928 | 45.88% | ▼3.59 |
| Libertarian | Keary Ehlers | 28,320 | 0.64% | ▼2.68 |
| Total votes | | 4,396,242 | 100.00% | |
| Republican gain from Democratic | | | | |
