= Dustin Burrows =

American politician from Texas (born 1978)

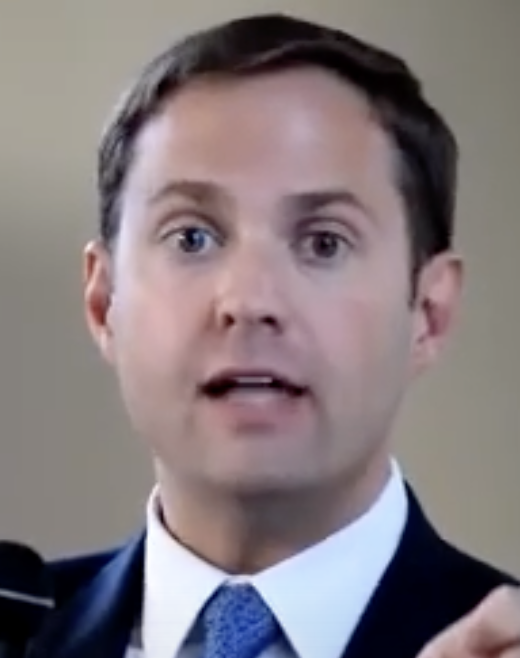
- Burrows in 2014

Speaker of the Texas House of Representatives
- Incumbent
- Assumed office January 14, 2025
- Preceded by: Dade Phelan

Majority Leader of the Texas House of Representatives
- In office January 8, 2019 – August 16, 2019
- Preceded by: Cindy Burkett
- Succeeded by: Stephanie Klick

Member of the Texas House of Representatives from the 83rd district
- Incumbent
- Assumed office January 13, 2015
- Preceded by: Charles Perry

Personal details
- Born: Dustin Ray Burrows; November 14, 1978 (age 48) Lubbock, Texas, U.S.
- Party: Republican
- Education: Rhodes College (BA); Texas Tech University (MBA, JD)
- Website: Office website Campaign website

Dustin Ray Burrows (born November 14, 1978) is an American politician, attorney, and businessman who has served as the speaker of the Texas House of Representatives since 2025. A member of the Republican Party, he has represented the 83rd district in the Texas House of Representatives since January 2015.

Burrows is the former chair of the House Ways and Means Committee, former chair of the House Calendars Committee, and the former chair of House Republican Caucus.

== Early life, education, and career ==
Burrows graduated from Monterey High School in Lubbock and earned an MBA and J.D. from Texas Tech University. Burrows is licensed to practice law in New Mexico and Texas and was a partner in the Texas firm McCleskey, Harriger, Brazill, & Graff.

== Texas House of Representatives ==
=== Nomination and election ===
The incumbent Representative of the 83rd district, Charles Perry, won the 2014 Republican primary; however, he dropped out of the race in order to run in a special election for a vacated Texas Senate seat. Burrows was nominated by the Terry County Republican Party to replace Perry on the ballot for the general election. He won the general election in November 2014, beating Democratic opponent Max R. Tarbox with 81.2 percent of the vote. He was re-elected in 2016, running unopposed.

=== Re-election, Chair of House Republican Caucus ===
He was re-elected to the House for his third legislative session in 2018, defeating Democrat Drew Landry with 77.3 percent of the vote. After the election, Burrows was elected as Chair of the House Republican Caucus, and was appointed to chair the Ways and Means Committee.

In this capacity Burrows authored the HB 2 bill, which enables Texas taxpayers to control local tax rates and tax increases. The legislation was partnered with another piece of legislation which dealt with public school finance reform, HB 3; that bill provides almost $5 billion in property tax relief and increased the state's share of school funding.

In addition to these bills, Burrows was behind legislation supporting Texas firefighters, an issue he had begun to successfully address during the prior session. During the 86th Session, Burrows co-authored HB 1521, "which would penalize insurers that illegally deny Texas first responders access to medical treatment for line-of-duty injuries covered under state workers' compensation laws. This proposed legislation would amend Section 415.021 of the Labor Code to add sanctions, administrative penalties, and other remedies, including attorney's fees, for administrative violations by self- or collectively insured municipalities obligated to cover eligible workers' compensation claims. The amount of the administrative penalty shall not be less than two times the total amount of benefits payable in connection with the first responder employee's claim."

HB 1525 – also authored by Burrows, Flower Mound Republican senator Jane Nelson and Dallas Democratic senator Royce West – will enable Texas to collect more than half a billion dollars over the next two years after enforcing the state's sales tax across state lines. Prior to this legislation, the state could only force sellers to collect Texas sales tax if they had a physical location in Texas, putting small businesses at a financial disadvantage.

Burrows was present at a 2019 meeting with Empower Texans CEO Michael Quinn Sullivan and Speaker of the House Dennis Bonnen, where Sullivan later accused them of offering press credentials in exchange for targeting moderate Republican members seeking re-election. Burrows resigned as Republican Caucus chairman following the accusation. An investigation by the Texas Rangers ultimately concluded that no laws were broken in the exchange.

=== Re-election, Chair of the House Calendars Committee ===
On August 22, 2019, Burrows announced he would seek re-election and was endorsed by Texas Governor Greg Abbott. He ran unopposed in the 2020 Republican primary and defeated Democrat Addison Perry-Franks in the general election with 79.29 percent of the vote. After the election, Burrows was assigned as the Chair of the House Calendars Committee, overseeing the timeline and order for bills to reach the House floor.

Burrows and Sen. Paul Bettencourt (R-Houston) introduced legislation to reprimand any localities who choose to use a loophole in the State's property tax code. Burrows spearheaded an ultimately successful effort to have gun stores in Texas declared essential businesses, allowing them to choose to open during the State's COVID-19 lockdown. During the regular session, Burrows supported local political efforts in Lubbock, Texas to outlaw abortion at the local level. After the Dallas Mavericks reportedly stopped playing the national anthem before games, Burrows supported suspending tax subsidies for stadiums that stopped playing the anthem.

Burrows chaired the investigative Committee on the Robb Elementary Shooting in 2022. He also authored HB 3 which required armed security on school campuses in Texas.

In the 88th legislative session, Burrows was the author of the controversial HB 2127, which opponents dubbed the "Death Star Bill". The bill limited the amount of power local governments had in regulating certain parts of the state code. The law was passed, but lawsuits kept the legislation from going into effect until a couple of years later.

=== Committee assignments ===
- 88th Legislative Session
  - Calendars (Chair)
  - Elections
  - Higher Education
  - Sustainable Property Tax Relief, Select Study
  - The Panhandle Wildfires, Investigative
- 87th Legislative Session
  - Calendars (Chair)
  - Corrections
  - Land & Resource Management
  - Chairman, Robb Elementary Shooting, Investigative
- 86th Legislative Session
  - Elections
  - Ways & Means (Chair)
- 85th Legislative Session
  - Agriculture & Livestock
  - Investments & Financial Services
- 84th Legislative Session
  - County Affairs
  - International Trade & Intergovernmental Affairs

== Speaker of the House ==
=== Election as Speaker of the House (2025) ===
In 2024, Burrows ran against David Cook for Speaker of the Texas House of Representatives after then-Speaker Dade Phelan announced he would not seek to retain the position. A major issue of the campaign was the question of whether Democrats, as members of the minority party, should hold any leadership positions as committee chairs, as had been the longstanding tradition. Cook campaigned on restricting chairmanships to the majority party, while Burrows thought the issue should be left to the body as a whole. On January 14, 2025, Burrows was elected Texas House Speaker after 49 Democrats joined 36 Republicans to back him in the second round of voting, defeating Cook by a vote of 85 to 55. When the new rules regarding committee assignments were announced, the compromise solution was that all committee chairs were to be reserved for the majority party, but that all vice-chairs were to be reserved for the minority party. In addition, there were newly created permanent standing subcommittees, which did not have the same partisan restriction.

Several Republican members of the legislature would go on to be censured by the Republican Party of Texas for "working against the party" by their support of Burrows and the new House committee structure which allowed Democrats to maintain some influence. Under the state party's Rule 44, censured members could be barred from running in the Republican Primary. Burrows pushed against the censures and enactment of the primary ban arguing that the ban would violate the member's freedoms of speech and political association. Ultimately, of the 10 members who had censure motions pending against them, including Burrows himself, only 5 were censured and none were barred from the 2026 primary.

=== Tenure ===
During the 89th legislature, Burrows oversaw the passage of legislation which provided "Education Savings Accounts" to allowed parents to use public money to cover private school tuition. The issue had long been pushed for by the Texas GOP and Governor Abbott, but in the past had met stiff opposition in the state House of Representatives. The session also saw many other conservative legislative priorities such as the passage of a ban on DEI in public school education, and the requirement that copies of the Ten Commandments be placed in every classroom.

On April 1, 2025, State Representative Brian Harrison attempted to remove Burrows as Speaker by making a motion to vacate the chair. He cited the changes of House rules regarding Democratic vice-chairs of committees and an alleged prioritization of Democratic legislative policies as the reason for his motion. Burrows refused to recognize Harrison for the motion stating that the motion "must be raised by resolution". On April 8, Harrison filed the resolution and it was put before the House the next day. The subsequent debate was swiftly shut down on a vote of 141–2, with only Harrison and Rep. David Lowe voting to continue debate.

On July 9, 2025, Governor Abbott called for a special session of the Texas Legislature to discuss an extraordinary mid-decade congressional redistricting. The session began on July 21 and when the new maps were scheduled to be brought to the House floor most House Democrats left the state, denying Republicans a quorum to vote on the legislation. Burrows issued a call of the house and signed arrest warrants to compel the absent representatives to return to the Capitol. However, the majority of the absent members were out of the state's jurisdiction in places like Chicago or New York, so the warrants could not be enforced. When the Democrats returned at the start of the next special session, the call of the house remained in place, and members who had participated in the quorum bust had to sign permission slips and submit to a police escort until the new maps were passed.

== Electoral history ==
2014 Texas House of Representatives 83rd district general election
Party	Candidate	Votes	%
Republican	Dustin Burrows	26,950	81.2
Democratic	Max R. Tarbox	6,231	18.8
Total votes		33,181	100.0
Republican hold			

2016 Texas House of Representatives 83rd district election
Primary election
Party	Candidate	Votes	%
Republican	Dustin Burrows (incumbent)	24,007	100.0
Total votes		24,007	100.0
General election
Republican	Dustin Burrows (incumbent)	53,437	100.0
Total votes		53,437	100.0
Republican hold			

2018 Texas House of Representatives 83rd district election
Primary election
Party	Candidate	Votes	%
Republican	Dustin Burrows (incumbent)	16,495	100.0
Total votes		16,495	100.0
General election
Republican	Dustin Burrows (incumbent)	45,379	77.3
Democratic	Drew Landry	13,309	22.7
Total votes		58,688	100.0
Republican hold			

2020 Texas House of Representatives 83rd district election
Primary election
Party	Candidate	Votes	%
Republican	Dustin Burrows (incumbent)	22,073	100.0
Total votes		22,073	100.0
General election
Republican	Dustin Burrows (incumbent)	61,959	79.3
Democratic	Addison Perry-Franks	16,185	20.7
Total votes		78,144	100.0
Republican hold			

2022 Texas House of Representatives 83rd district election (Note: In September 2022, the Texas Secretary of State declared multiple candidates who were running unopposed "elected" and as such they did not appear on the ballot.)
Primary election
Party	Candidate	Votes	%
Republican	Dustin Burrows (incumbent)	18,397	82.5
Republican	Austin Jordan	3,891	17.5
Total votes		22,288	100.0
General election
Republican	Dustin Burrows (incumbent)	Unopposed	
Republican hold			

2024 Texas House of Representatives 83rd district election
Primary election
Party	Candidate	Votes	%
Republican	Dustin Burrows (incumbent)	17,279	68.0
Republican	Wade Cowan	8,128	32.0
Total votes		25,407	100.0
General election
Republican	Dustin Burrows (incumbent)	69,899	100.0
Total votes		69,899	100.0
Republican hold			

== Personal life ==
Burrows is married to Elisabeth (née Hause), who grew up in South Texas in a family engaged in cattle ranching and oil and natural gas. They have three sons. The family is evangelical Christian.

== Notes ==
Texas House of Representatives
Preceded by Charles Perry	Member of the Texas House of Representatives from the 83rd district 2015–present	Incumbent
Preceded by Cindy Burkett	Majority Leader of the Texas House of Representatives; 2019	Succeeded by Stephanie Klick
Political offices
Preceded by Dade Phelan	Speaker of the Texas House of Representatives; 2025–present	Incumbent
