= Kristi Thibaut =

American politician from Texas (1964-)

Member of the Texas House of Representatives from the 133rd district
- In office January 13, 2009 – January 11, 2011
- Preceded by: Jim Murphy
- Succeeded by: Jim Murphy

Personal details
- Born: 1964 or 1965 (age 61–62)
- Party: Democratic

Kristi Thibaut (born 1964 or 1965) is an American politician. She served one term in the Texas House of Representatives.

== Political career ==
Thibaut first ran for the Texas House of Representatives in 2006, where she lost to Republican incumbent Jim Murphy. She ran again in 2008, where she narrowly defeated Murphy by 497 votes. During her time in the House, she was a member of the Culture, Recreation & Tourism and Land & Resource Management committees. Thibaut ran for re-election in 2010, but lost to Jim Murphy.

In 2011, Thibault ran for the Houston City Council's at-large position 2 seat. She came in second in the general election, advancing to the run-off, where she lost to Andrew C. Burks.
