= Samuel Thomas Jones =

American politician (1864–1929)

Member of the Texas House of Representatives from the 91st district
- In office January 12, 1897 – January 10, 1899
- Preceded by: Frank Herman Frederic Burmeister
- Succeeded by: John Nance Garner

Personal details
- Born: March 14, 1864
- Died: March 28, 1929 (aged 65)
- Party: Democratic

Samuel Thomas Jones (March 14, 1864 – March 28, 1929) was an American politician. He served as a Democratic member for the 91st district of the Texas House of Representatives.
