= Texas's 133rd House of Representatives district =

American legislative district

Texas's 133rd State House of Representatives district
Representative
| Mano DeAyala; R–Houston |
- Demographics: 49.5% White; 16.3% Black; 19.2% Hispanic; 14.3% Asian
- Population (2020) • Voting age: 189,647; 148,744

The 133rd district of the Texas House of Representatives contains parts of Harris County. The current representative is Mano DeAyala, who was first elected in 2022.

== List of representatives ==
- Jim Murphy from 2018 to 2022
