= Texas's 83rd House of Representatives district =

American legislative district

Texas's 83rd State House of Representatives district
Representative
Dustin Burrows; R–Lubbock
- Demographics: 56.6% White; 5.2% Black; 35.0% Hispanic; 2.0% Asian
- Population (2020) • Voting age: 185,969; 140,204

District 83 is a district in the Texas House of Representatives. Following 2021 redistricting, the district represents the entirety of the following counties: Borden, Crosby, Dickens, Floyd, Garza, Kent, Lynn, Mitchell, Scurry, and Terry. In addition, the district represents a portion of Lubbock County. Since 2014, it has been represented by Republican Dustin Burrows.

== Representatives ==
Leg.	Representative	Party	Term start	Term end	Counties represented
18th	Alexander J. Leo Jr.	Democratic	January 9, 1883	November 24, 1883	Duval Hidalgo Starr, Webb, Zapata, Encinal
18th	Santos Benavides	Democratic	January 9, 1883	January 13, 1885	Duval Hidalgo Starr, Webb, Zapata, Encinal
18th	John McAllen	Republican	January 9, 1884	January 13, 1885	Duval Hidalgo Starr, Webb, Zapata, Encinal
19th	Edwin Augustus Atlee, Sr.	Democratic	January 13, 1885	January 11, 1887	Duval Hidalgo Starr, Webb, Zapata, Encinal
19th	Thomas W. Kennedy	Democratic	January 13, 1885	January 11, 1887	Duval Hidalgo Starr, Webb, Zapata, Encinal
20th	Thomas W. Kennedy, James Watterson Showalter	Democratic	January 11, 1887	January 8, 1889	Duval Hidalgo Starr, Webb, Zapata, Encinal
21st	Thomas W. Kennedy, Albert Urbahn	Democratic	January 8, 1889	January 13, 1891	Duval Hidalgo Starr, Webb, Zapata, Encinal
22nd	Albert Urbahn, John James Dix Jr.	Democratic	January 13, 1891	January 10, 1893	Duval Hidalgo Starr, Webb, Zapata, Encinal
23rd	A.G. Kennedy	Democratic	January 10, 1893	January 8, 1895	Bee, Calhoun, Jackson, Refugio, Victoria
24th	J. D. Mitchell	Democratic	January 8, 1895	January 12, 1897	Bee, Calhoun, Jackson, Refugio, Victoria
25th	Thomas Carlysle McFarland	Democratic	January 12, 1897	January 10, 1899	Bee, Calhoun, Jackson, Refugio, Victoria
26th	Thomas Carlysle McFarland	Democratic	January 10, 1899	January 8, 1901	Bee, Calhoun, Jackson, Refugio, Victoria
27th	George Murat Thurmond	Democratic	January 8, 1901	January 13, 1903	Bee, Calhoun, Jackson, Refugio, Victoria
28th	George F. Daugherty	Democratic	January 13, 1903	January 10, 1905	Clay, Jack
29th	George F. Daugherty	Democratic	January 10, 1905	January 8, 1907	Clay, Jack
30th	James Isaac Ballengee	Democratic	January 8, 1907	January 12, 1909	Clay, Jack
31st	James Isaac Ballengee	Democratic	January 12, 1909	January 10, 1911	Clay, Jack
32nd	Edgar Pierce Haney	Democratic	January 10, 1911	January 14, 1913	Clay, Jack
33rd	James Greenwood	Democratic	January 14, 1913	January 12, 1915	Guadalupe
34th	James Greenwood	Democratic	January 12, 1915	January 9, 1917	Guadalupe
35th	Rudolph Tschoepe	Democratic	January 9, 1917	September 29, 1917	Guadalupe
35th	George Justus Kempen	Unaffiliated	May 15, 1918	January 14, 1919	Guadalupe
36th	Herman August Heideke	Republican	January 14, 1919	January 11, 1921	Guadalupe
37th	Egbert Schweppe	Republican	January 11, 1921	October 18, 1922	Guadalupe
38th	Claud Duval Teer	Democratic	January 9, 1923	January 13, 1925	Williamson
39th	Claud Duval Teer	Democratic	January 13, 1925	January 11, 1927	Williamson
40th	Claud Duval Teer	Democratic	January 11, 1927	September 20, 1927	Williamson
41st	Harry Newton Graves	Democratic	January 8, 1929	January 13, 1931	Williamson
42nd	Harry Newton Graves	Democratic	January 13, 1931	January 10, 1933	Williamson
43rd	Harry Newton Graves	Democratic	January 10, 1933	January 8, 1935	Williamson
44th	Harry Newton Graves	Democratic	January 8, 1935	January 12, 1937	Williamson
45th	Harry Newton Graves	Democratic	January 12, 1937	October 28, 1937	Williamson
45th	Robert Gottfried Stoll	Democratic	July 23, 1938	January 10, 1939	Williamson
46th	Robert Gottfried Stoll	Democratic	January 10, 1939	January 14, 1941	Williamson
47th	Duncan Spence Hughes	Democratic	January 14, 1941	August 16, 1942	Williamson
48th	Frank G. Svadlenak	Democratic	January 12, 1943	January 9, 1945	Williamson
49th	Frank G. Svadlenak	Democratic	January 9, 1945	January 14, 1947	Williamson
50th	Frank G. Svadlenak	Democratic	January 14, 1947	January 11, 1949	Williamson
51st	Frank G. Svadlenak	Democratic	January 11, 1949	January 9, 1951	Williamson
52nd	Frank G. Svadlenak	Democratic	January 9, 1951	January 13, 1953	Williamson
53rd	John Kimbrough	Democratic	January 13, 1953	January 11, 1955	Baylor, Haskell, Knox, Throckmorton
54th	Edward Jacob Cloud	Democratic	January 11, 1955	January 8, 1957	Baylor, Haskell, Knox, Throckmorton
55th	Edward Jacob Cloud	Democratic	January 8, 1957	January 13, 1959	Baylor, Haskell, Knox, Throckmorton
56th	Edward Jacob Cloud	Democratic	January 13, 1959	January 10, 1961	Baylor, Haskell, Knox, Throckmorton
57th	James Carl Wheatley	Democratic	January 10, 1961	January 8, 1963	Baylor, Haskell, Knox, Throckmorton
58th	Roy Wade Arledge	Democratic	January 8, 1963	January 12, 1965	Baylor, Haskell, Jones, Knox, Throckmorton
59th	Roy Wade Arledge	Democratic	January 12, 1965	January 10, 1967	Baylor, Haskell, Jones, Knox, Throckmorton
60th	Bill W. Barton	Democratic	January 10, 1967	January 14, 1969	Dallam, Hansford, Hartley, Hutchinson, Moore, Sherman
63rd	Larry A. Vick	Republican	January 9, 1973	January 14, 1975	Harris
64th	Larry A. Vick	Republican	January 14, 1975	January 11, 1977	Harris
65th	Chase Untermeyer	Republican	January 11, 1977	January 9, 1979	Harris
66th	Chase Untermeyer	Republican	January 9, 1979	January 13, 1981	Harris
67th	Edgar Ashley Smith	Republican	January 27, 1981	January 11, 1983	Harris
68th	Froylan D. Salinas	Democratic	January 11, 1983	January 8, 1985	Lubbock
69th	Ron D. Givens	Republican	January 8, 1985	January 13, 1987	Lubbock
70th	Ron D. Givens	Republican	January 13, 1987	January 10, 1989	Lubbock
71st	Delwin Jones	Republican	January 10, 1989	January 8, 1991	Lubbock
72nd	Delwin Jones	Republican	January 8, 1991	January 12, 1993	Lubbock
73rd	Delwin Jones	Republican	January 12, 1993	January 10, 1995	Lubbock
74th	Delwin Jones	Republican	January 10, 1995	January 14, 1997	Lubbock
75th	Delwin Jones	Republican	January 14, 1997	January 12, 1999	Lubbock
76th	Delwin Jones	Republican	January 12, 1999	January 9, 2001	Lubbock
77th	Delwin Jones	Republican	January 9, 2001	January 14, 2003	Lubbock
78th	Delwin Jones	Republican	January 14, 2003	January 11, 2005	Cochran, Gaines, Hockley, Lubbock, Yoakum
79th	Delwin Jones	Republican	January 11, 2005	January 9, 2007	Cochran, Gaines, Hockley, Lubbock, Yoakum
80th	Delwin Jones	Republican	January 9, 2007	January 13, 2009	Cochran, Gaines, Hockley, Lubbock, Yoakum
81st	Delwin Jones	Republican	January 13, 2009	January 11, 2011	Cochran, Gaines, Hockley, Lubbock, Yoakum
82nd	Charles Lee Perry	Republican	January 11, 2011	January 8, 2013	Cochran, Gaines, Hockley, Lubbock, Yoakum
83rd	Charles Lee Perry	Republican	January 8, 2013	September 30, 2014	Borden, Gaines, Lubbock, Lynn, Mitchell, Scurry, Terry
84th	Dustin Burrows	Republican	January 13, 2015	January 10, 2017	Borden, Gaines, Lubbock, Lynn, Mitchell, Scurry, Terry
85th	Dustin Burrows	Republican	January 10, 2017	January 8, 2019	Borden, Gaines, Lubbock, Lynn, Mitchell, Scurry, Terry
86th	Dustin Burrows	Republican	January 8, 2019	January 12, 2021	Borden, Gaines, Lubbock, Lynn, Mitchell, Scurry, Terry
87th	Dustin Burrows	Republican	January 12, 2021	January 10, 2023	Borden, Gaines, Lubbock, Lynn, Mitchell, Scurry, Terry
88th	Dustin Burrows	Republican	January 10, 2023	January 14, 2025	Borden, Gaines, Lubbock, Lynn, Mitchell, Scurry, Terry
89th	Dustin Burrows	Republican	January 14, 2025		Borden, Crosby, Dickens, Floyd, Garza, Kent, Lynn, Mitchell, Scurry, Terry
