= Texas's 91st House of Representatives district =

Electoral district of Texas

Texas's 91st State House of Representatives district
Representative
David Lowe; R–Fort Worth

District 91 is a district in the Texas House of Representatives. It has been represented by Republican David Lowe since 2025.

== Geography ==
The district contains parts of the Tarrant County.

== Members ==
=== 19th-century ===
- Frank Herman Frederic Burmeister (until 1897)
- Samuel Thomas Jones (January 12, 1897 – January 10, 1899) (Democrat)
- John Nance Garner (January 10, 1899 – January 13, 1903) (Democrat)

=== 20th-century ===
- Ferdinand C. Weinert (after 1903) (Democrat)
- Howard Bland (January 12, 1915 – January 9, 1917)
- Cecil Hamilton Barnes (January 9, 1945-January 14, 1947)
- Peppy Blount (January 14, 1947-September 26, 1951)

=== 21st-century ===
- Bob Griggs (until 2007)
- Kelly Hancock (January 9, 2007 – January 7, 2013)
- Stephanie Klick (2013 – 2024)
- David Lowe (2024– present)
