= John Nance Garner =

Vice President of the United States from 1933 to 1941

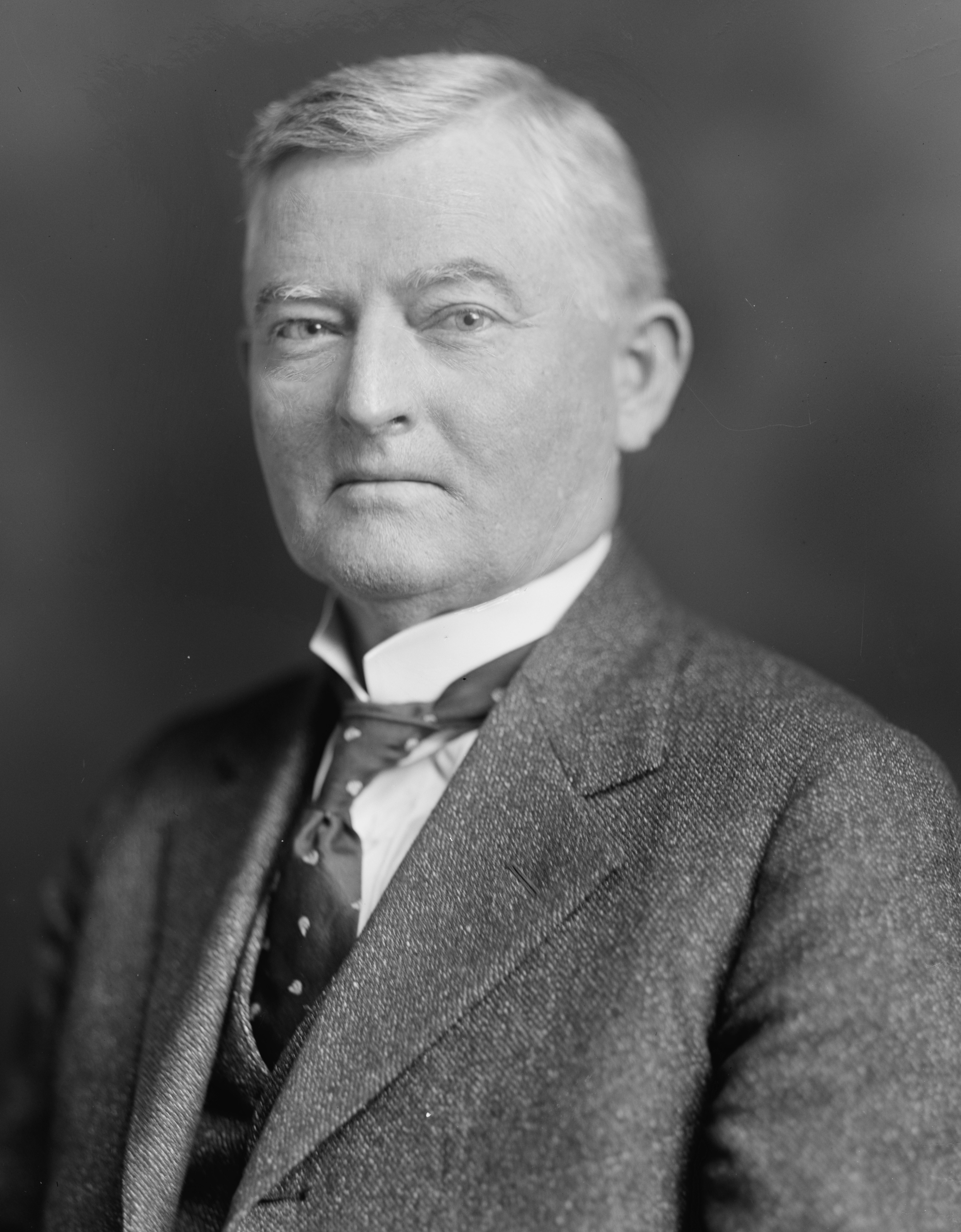
- Portrait, c. 1930s

32nd Vice President of the United States
- In office March 4, 1933 – January 20, 1941
- President: Franklin D. Roosevelt
- Preceded by: Charles Curtis
- Succeeded by: Henry A. Wallace

39th Speaker of the United States House of Representatives
- In office December 7, 1931 – March 3, 1933
- Preceded by: Nicholas Longworth
- Succeeded by: Henry T. Rainey

House Minority Leader
- In office March 4, 1929 – March 3, 1931
- Whip: John McDuffie
- Preceded by: Finis J. Garrett
- Succeeded by: Bertrand Snell

Leader of the House Democratic Caucus
- In office March 4, 1929 – March 3, 1933
- Preceded by: Finis J. Garrett
- Succeeded by: Henry T. Rainey

Member of the U.S. House of Representatives from Texas's 15th district
- In office March 4, 1903 – March 3, 1933
- Preceded by: Constituency established
- Succeeded by: Milton H. West

Member of the Texas House of Representatives from the 91st district
- In office January 10, 1899 – January 13, 1903
- Preceded by: Samuel Thomas Jones
- Succeeded by: Ferdinand C. Weinert

County Judge of Uvalde County, Texas
- In office 1893–1896
- Preceded by: A. V. D. Old
- Succeeded by: J. E. Cummings

Personal details
- Born: John Nance Garner III; November 22, 1868 Red River County, Texas, U.S.
- Died: November 7, 1967 (aged 98) Uvalde, Texas, U.S.
- Resting place: Old Uvalde Cemetery
- Party: Democratic
- Spouse: Mariette Rheiner (m. 1895; died 1948)
- Children: 1
- Education: Vanderbilt University
- Occupation: Politician; lawyer

John Nance Garner III (November 22, 1868 – November 7, 1967), known among his contemporaries as "Cactus Jack", was the 32nd vice president of the United States, serving from 1933 to 1941 under President Franklin D. Roosevelt. A member of the Democratic Party, Garner served as the 39th speaker of the U.S. House of Representatives from 1931 to 1933, having been a U.S. representative from Texas from 1903 to 1933. Garner and Schuyler Colfax are the only politicians to have served as presiding officers of both chambers of the U.S. Congress as speaker of the House and vice president of the United States. He was the longest-lived vice president in U.S. history, dying at the age of 98.

Garner began his political career as the county judge of Uvalde County, Texas. He served in the Texas House of Representatives from 1899 to 1903 and won election to represent Texas in the U.S. House of Representatives in 1902. He represented Texas's 15th congressional district from 1903 to 1933. Garner served as House Minority Leader from 1929 to 1931, and was elevated to Speaker of the House when Democrats won control of the House following special elections in 1931 (Republicans actually retained control immediately after the 1930 elections, but lost as several seats shifted parties).

Garner sought the Democratic presidential nomination in the 1932 presidential election, but agreed to serve as Roosevelt's running mate at the 1932 Democratic National Convention. He and Roosevelt won the 1932 election and were reelected in 1936. A conservative Southerner, Garner opposed the sit-down strikes of the labor unions and the New Deal's deficit spending. At the same time, he was considered highly effective in the passage of New Deal legislation, with Roosevelt relying greatly on Garner's wealth of political friendships and legislative skills to pilot New Deal legislation through Congress. Unlike vice presidents before him, Garner also had an active, non-ceremonial role in the U.S. Cabinet. He broke with Roosevelt in 1937 over a range of issues, especially the centralization of power in the federal government. Garner again sought the presidency in the 1940 presidential election, but Roosevelt won the party's nomination at the 1940 Democratic National Convention and chose Henry A. Wallace as his running mate and ultimately won an unprecedented third term.

== Early life and family ==
Garner was born on November 22, 1868, in a mud-chinked log cabin in Red River County, Texas, to John Nance Garner Jr. and Sarah Guest Garner. That cabin no longer exists, but the large, white, two-story house where he was raised survives, at 260 South Main Street in Detroit, Texas.

Garner attended Vanderbilt University in Nashville, Tennessee, for one semester before dropping out and returning home. He studied law at the firm of Sims and Wright in Clarksville, Texas, was admitted to the bar in 1890, and began practice in 1896 in Uvalde, Texas, where he had lived since 1892.

In 1893, Garner entered politics, running for county judge of Uvalde County, the county's chief administrative officer. Garner was opposed in the primary by a woman—Mariette Rheiner Garner, a rancher's daughter, whom, after the election, he courted and married in 1895. Garner won, and with the Democratic nomination seen as tantamount to election in the post–Civil War Solid South, was elected county judge and served until 1896.

== Texas politics ==
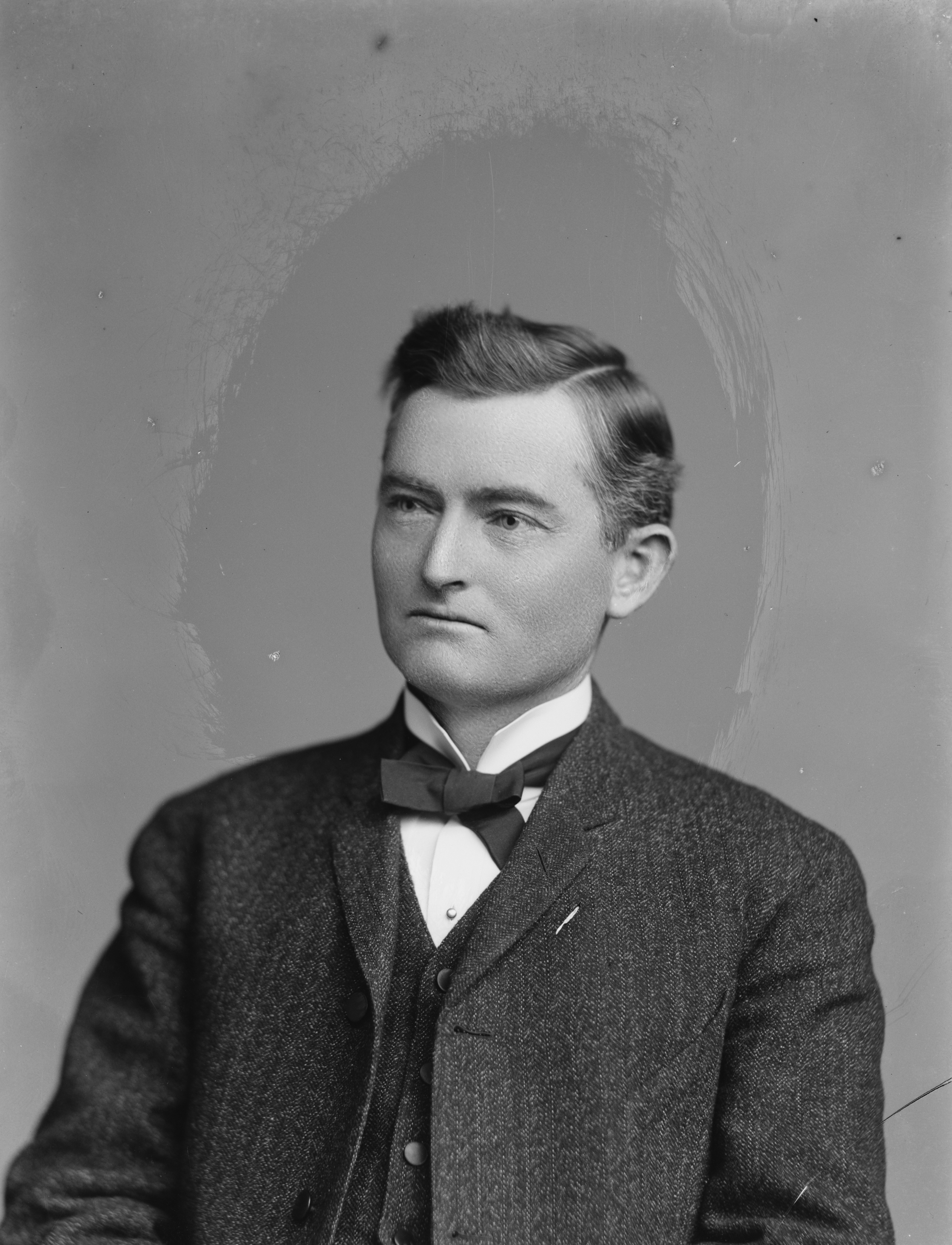
Portrait by C. M. Bell, 1903

Garner was elected to the Texas House of Representatives in 1898 and reelected in 1900. During his service, the legislature selected a state flower for Texas. Garner fervently supported the prickly pear cactus, and thus earned the nickname "Cactus Jack". The bluebonnet was ultimately chosen.

Garner also drafted a resolution that would have divided Texas into five states. It passed the Texas House but was vetoed by the governor.

In 1901, Garner voted for the poll tax, a measure passed by the Democratic-dominated legislature to make voter registration more difficult and reduce the number of minority and poor voters on the voting rolls. This disfranchised most minority voters until the 1960s, and ended challenges to Democratic power; Texas became in effect a one-party state.

Garner traveled parts of southern Texas controlled by the patrón system, currying political favor with the land bosses who exercised near-complete control of the local people and local elections. His patrón allies created a gerrymandered district for him, the 15th congressional district, shaped in a narrow strip reaching south to include tens of thousands of square miles of rural areas.

== House of Representatives ==
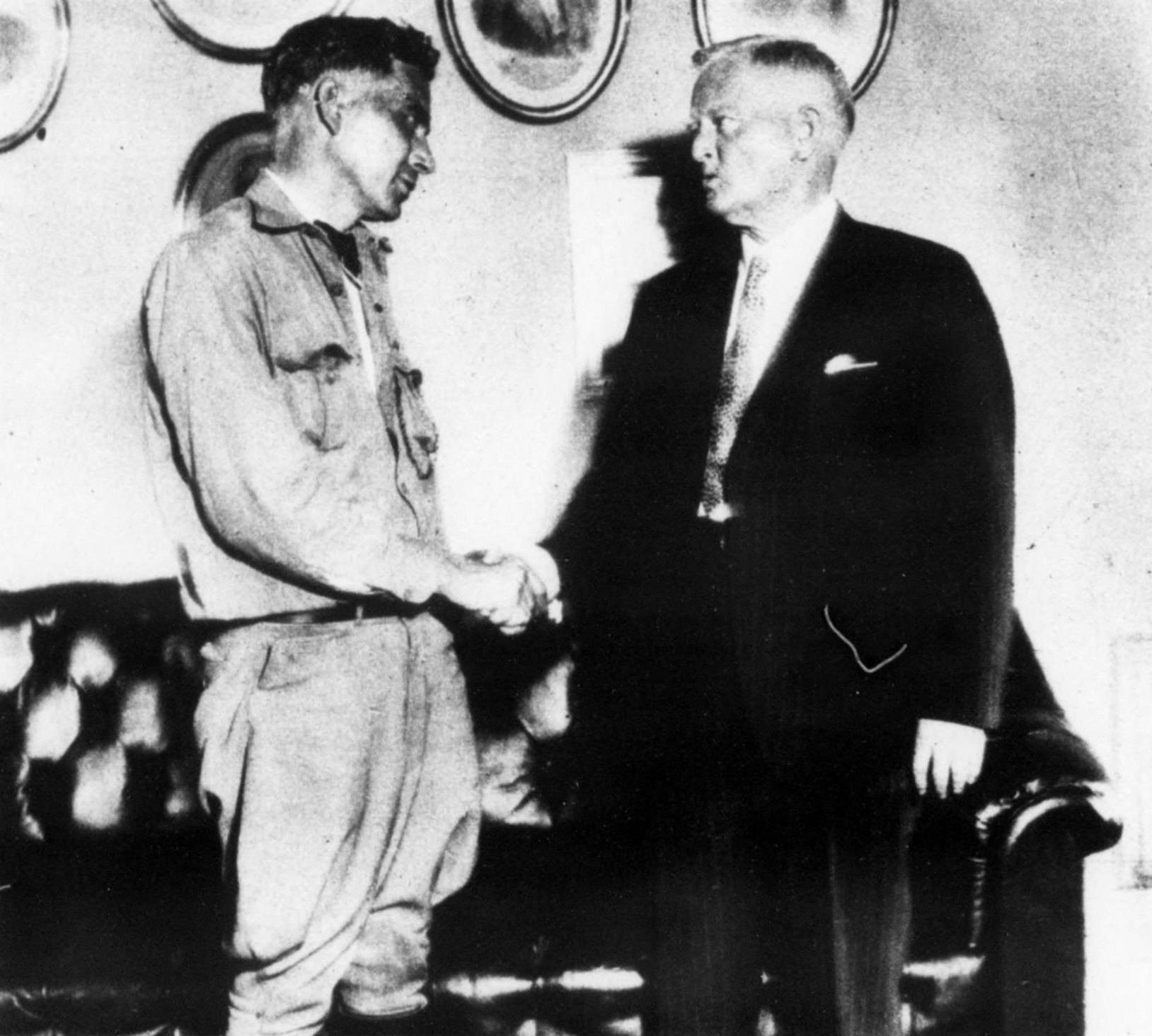
Speaker Garner meets with Bonus Army Commander Walter W. Waters, July 1932

Garner was first elected to the United States House of Representatives in 1902. He was elected from the district 14 subsequent times, serving until 1933. His wife was paid and worked as his private secretary during this period. Throughout his career he maintained allegiance to the white landowners who controlled the voting booths in South Texas. He regarded his Mexican voting base as "inferior and undesirable as U.S. citizens."

Garner was chosen to serve as minority floor leader for the Democrats in 1929, and in 1931 as Speaker of the United States House of Representatives, when the Democrats became the majority.

== Vice presidency (1933–1941) ==
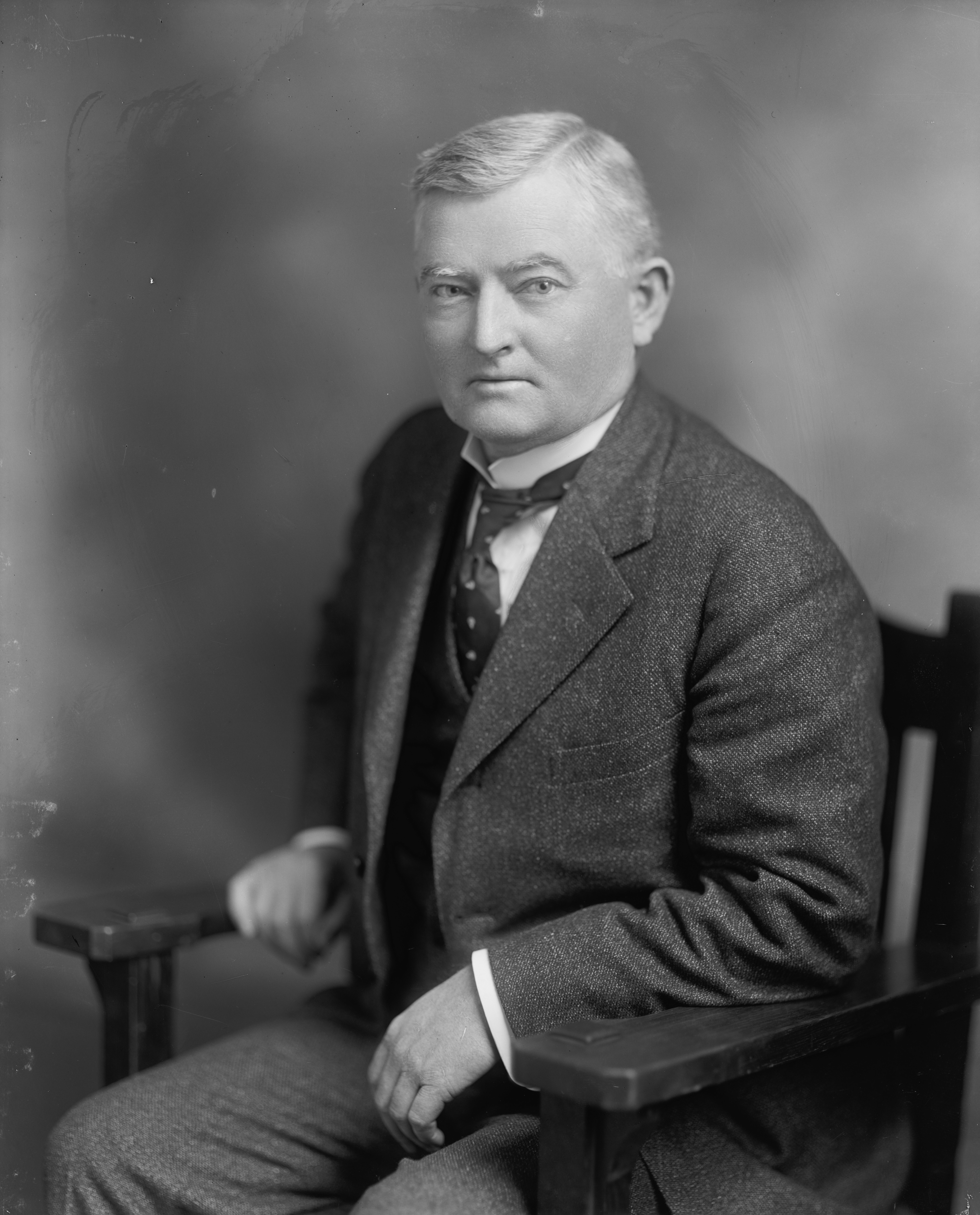
Garner in the 1930s

In 1932, Garner ran for the Democratic presidential nomination. It had become evident that Franklin D. Roosevelt, the governor of New York, was the strongest of several candidates, but although he had a solid majority of convention delegates, he was 87.25 votes short of the two-thirds required for nomination. After Garner cut a deal with Roosevelt, thus allowing Roosevelt to win the nomination, Garner became his vice-presidential candidate.

Garner was re-elected to the 73rd Congress on November 8, 1932, and on the same day was also elected Vice President of the United States. On February 8, 1933, then–vice president Charles Curtis announced the election of his successor, House Speaker Garner, while Garner was seated next to him on the House dais. He was the second man, Schuyler Colfax being the first, to serve as both Speaker of the House and president of the Senate. Garner was re-elected vice president with Roosevelt in 1936, serving in that office in total from March 4, 1933, to January 20, 1941.

Unlike many U.S. vice-presidents, Garner would have a very prominent role in shaping the president's policies, with Roosevelt using Garner's knowledge and experience to pilot New Deal legislation through Congress.

During the early months of his vice presidency, Garner served as presiding officer of the impeachment trial of Harold Louderback in the Senate.

During Roosevelt's second term, Garner's previously warm relationship with the president quickly soured, as Garner disagreed sharply with him on a wide range of important issues. Garner supported federal intervention to break up the Flint sit-down strike, supported a balanced federal budget, opposed the Judiciary Reorganization Bill of 1937 to "pack" the Supreme Court with additional justices, and opposed executive interference with the internal business of the Congress.

During 1938 and 1939, numerous Democratic party leaders urged Garner to run for president in the 1940 presidential election. Garner identified as the champion of the traditional Democratic Party establishment, which often clashed with supporters of Roosevelt's New Deal. The Gallup poll showed that Garner was the favorite among Democratic voters, based on the assumption that Roosevelt would defer to the longstanding two-term tradition and not run for a third term. Time characterized him on April 15, 1940:

Cactus Jack is 71, sound in wind & limb, a hickory conservative who does not represent the Old South of magnolias, hoopskirts, pillared verandas, but the New South: moneymaking, industrial, hardboiled, still expanding too rapidly to brood over social problems. He stands for oil derricks, sheriffs who use airplanes, prairie skyscrapers, mechanized farms, $100 Stetson hats. Conservative John Garner appeals to many a conservative voter.

Some other Democrats did not find him appealing. In congressional testimony, union leader John L. Lewis described him using tetrameter as "a labor-baiting, poker-playing, whiskey-drinking, evil old man".

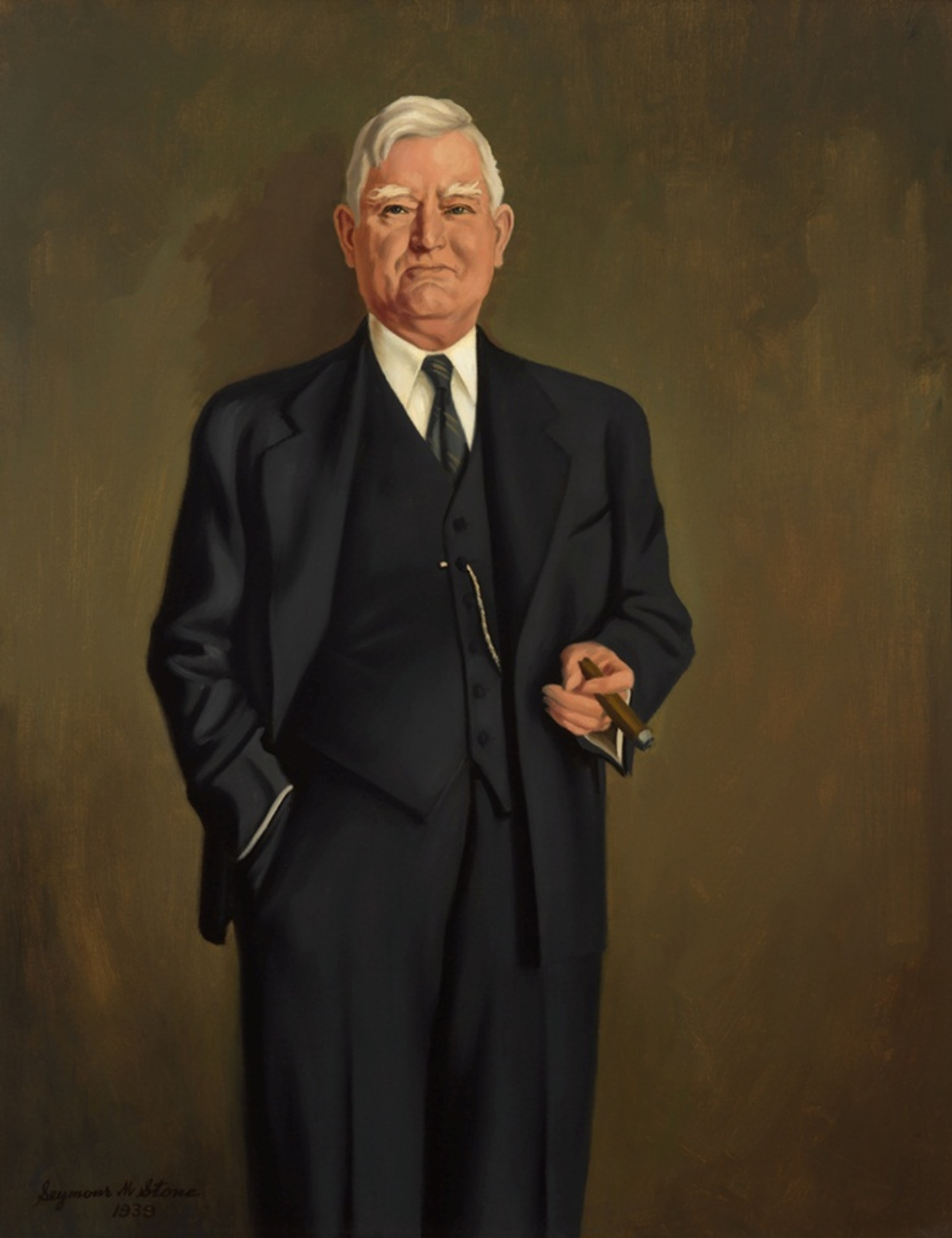
Portrait of Vice President Garner by Seymour M. Stone, c. 1939

Garner declared his candidacy. Roosevelt refused to say whether he would run again. If he did, it was highly unlikely that Garner could win the nomination, but Garner stayed in the race anyway. He opposed some of Roosevelt's New Deal policies, most notably those related to wooing labor, and on principle, opposed presidents serving third terms. However, Garner was also credited with steering a number of important bills through Congress in the crisis atmosphere of Roosevelt's first one hundred days in office and his relationship with the President would not become strained until Roosevelt's second term, when the Vice President's hopes of balancing the budget and paring New Deal programs faded. He was also active in Roosevelt's Cabinet meetings on national policy and legislative strategy, which also resulted in the effective transformation of the previously ceremonial office of the U.S. vice president. However, the president's "court-packing" plan of 1937 widened the rift with Garner, and the final blow in their relationship came when the president attempted to purge opposition Democratic members of Congress in the 1938 elections. Also, by 1940, Garner had come to support federal legislation against lynching, which Roosevelt opposed.

At the Democratic National Convention, Roosevelt engineered a "spontaneous" call for his renomination, and won on the first ballot. Garner received only 61 votes out of 1,093. Roosevelt chose Henry A. Wallace to be his vice-presidential running mate.

== Post vice-presidency (1941–1967) ==
Garner left office on January 20, 1941, ending a 46-year career in public life. He retired to his home in Uvalde for the last 26 years of his life, where he managed his extensive real estate holdings, spent time with his great-grandchildren, and fished. Throughout his retirement, he was consulted by active Democratic politicians and was especially close to Roosevelt's successor, Harry S. Truman. His papers are held at the Dolph Briscoe Center for American History, which also operates Garner's former home as a historic site.

In the early morning of Garner's 95th birthday, November 22, 1963, President John F. Kennedy called to wish him a happy birthday. This was several hours before Kennedy's assassination. Dan Rather stated that he visited the Garner ranch that morning to film an interview with Garner.

== Personal life and death ==
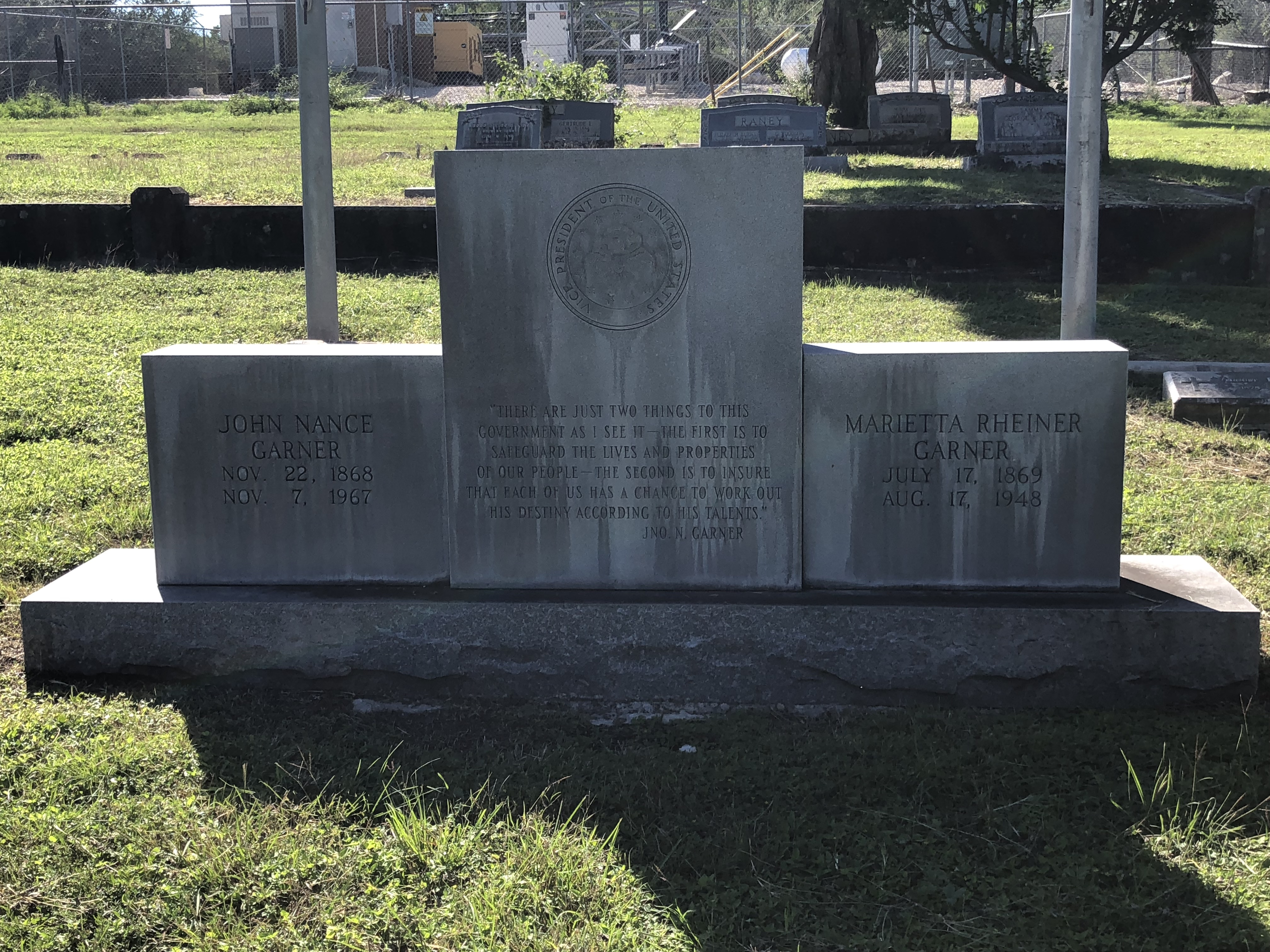
Garner's grave in Uvalde Cemetery

Garner and Mariette Rheiner met and began dating after the primary election in 1893. They married in Sabinal, Texas, on November 25, 1895. Mariette served as her husband's secretary throughout his congressional career, and as Second Lady of the United States during her husband's tenure as vice president. Their son, Tully Charles Garner (1896–1968), became a banker and businessman. Garner died of a coronary occlusion on November 7, 1967. At the age of 98 years and 350 days, Garner remains the longest-lived vice president of the United States in history.

== Legacy ==
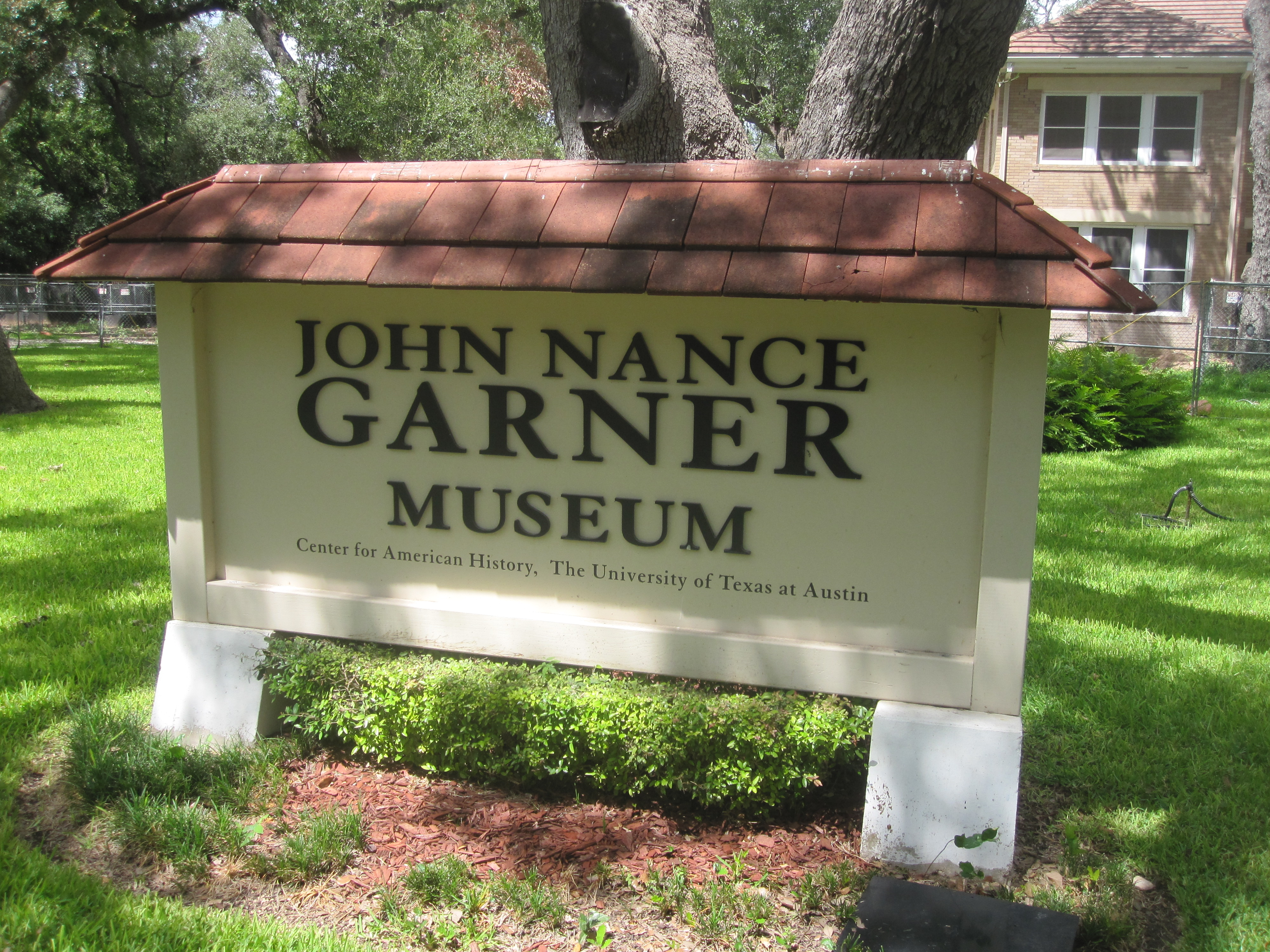
Garner Museum in Uvalde, Texas

Contrary to reports of Garner supposedly thinking little of his time as vice president and calling the vice presidency things such as "not worth a bucket of warm spit," it is accepted that his power and influence in Congress proved pivotal in getting New Deal legislation passed.

Garner State Park, located 30 miles (48 km) north of Uvalde, bears his name, as does Garner Field just east of Uvalde. The women's dormitory at Southwest Texas Junior College in Uvalde bears his wife's name. John Garner Middle School, located in San Antonio's North East Independent School District, is also named after him.

Garner and Schuyler Colfax, vice president under Ulysses S. Grant, are the only two vice presidents to have been Speaker of the House of Representatives prior to becoming vice president. As the vice president is also the president of the Senate, Garner and Colfax are the only people to have served as the presiding officer of both houses of Congress.

== See also ==
- Conservative Democrat

== Footnotes ==
U.S. House of Representatives
New constituency	Member of the U.S. House of Representatives from Texas's 15th congressional district 1903–1933	Succeeded by Milton H. West
Party political offices
Preceded by Finis J. Garrett	House Democratic Leader; 1929–1933	Succeeded by Henry T. Rainey
Preceded by Joe Robinson	Democratic nominee for Vice President of the United States; 1932, 1936	Succeeded by Henry A. Wallace
Political offices
Preceded by Finis J. Garrett	House Minority Leader; 1929–1931	Succeeded by Bertrand Snell
Preceded by Nicholas Longworth	Speaker of the United States House of Representatives; 1931–1933	Succeeded by Henry T. Rainey
Preceded by Charles Curtis	Vice President of the United States; 1933–1941	Succeeded by Henry A. Wallace
