= Howard Bland =

American businessman and politician (1848–1933)

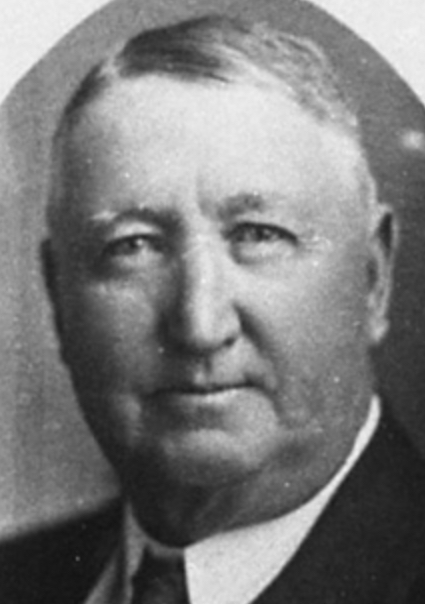
- Bland in 1915

Member of the Texas House of Representatives from the 91st district
- In office January 12, 1915 – January 9, 1917

Personal details
- Born: May 5, 1848 Zanesville, Ohio, US
- Died: March 9, 1933 (aged 84)
- Party: Democratic

Military service
- Rank: Colonel

Howard Bland Sr. (May 5, 1848 – March 9, 1933) was an American businessman and politician.

== Biography ==
Bland was born on May 5, 1848, in Zanesville, Ohio. He moved to Taylor, Texas in 1878 to work as a businessman. He also founded the Taylor Press. In 1880, he returned to Zanesville to marry Augusta Schultz.

Bland served as a Democratic member of the 34th Texas Legislature from the 91st District. He served from January 12, 1915, to January 9, 1917. In 1919, he was selected by William P. Hobby to represent Texas at the World's Cotton Fair. Bland died on March 9, 1933.

Bland was also a settler of Zella, Texas, which was named for his daughter Zella.
