= Killeen Daily Herald =

Newspaper in Killeen, Texas

- Type: Daily newspaper
- Format: Broadsheet
- Owner(s): Frank Mayborn Enterprises, Inc.
- Publisher: Sue Mayborn
- Editor: Sue Mayborn
- Managing editor: Rose Fitzpatrick
- General manager: Terry Gandy
- Founded: 1890
- Headquarters: Killeen, Texas
- Circulation: 5,681 (as of 2023)
- Website: Killeen Daily Herald

The Killeen Daily Herald is a daily newspaper in Killeen, Texas. The newspaper is owned by Frank Mayborn Enterprises, Inc.

== History ==
The newspaper was established in June 1890 as the weekly Killeen Herald, owned by W.E. Bennett. Bennett sold the newspaper in 1893, and ownership of the newspaper changed several times before Bennett repurchased it in 1903. After a failed transition to a daily, William H. Carter bought it that year and reverted it to a weekly format.

Shortly thereafter, Bennett also formed semi-weekly newspaper called the Killeen Messenger. Carter bought the Messenger a year after its founding and merged the pair into the Killeen Daily Herald and Messenger, which remained its name until 1953, when the newspaper was renamed the Killeen Daily Herald upcoming becoming a daily newspaper. Carter was publisher of the paper for 43 years, until 1950.

Journalist James C. Tanner bought the newspaper in 1950, with Carter keeping the printing portion of the business. Tanner, in his early twenties, was the publisher and editor, and his wife, Trinnia, was treasurer. On January 5, 1953, the newspaper switched from publishing twice a week (Tuesday and Friday) to five days a week (Monday–Friday), and changed its name to Killeen Daily Herald.

In 1953, Temple Daily Telegram owner Frank W. Mayborn purchased the Daily Herald. The new daily afternoon format was published Monday through Friday, with a weekly option called the Messenger preserved for legacy readers. A Sunday edition was added in 1969 and the paper went to 7-day publication in 1982, switching to a morning release at that time.

Mayborn died in 1987 and his widow, Sue Mayborn, took over editor and publisher duties, continuing until 12 October 2025. Terry Gandy has been the general manager of the paper since 1998.

== See also ==
- List of newspapers in Texas
