= Mano DeAyala =

American lawyer and politician

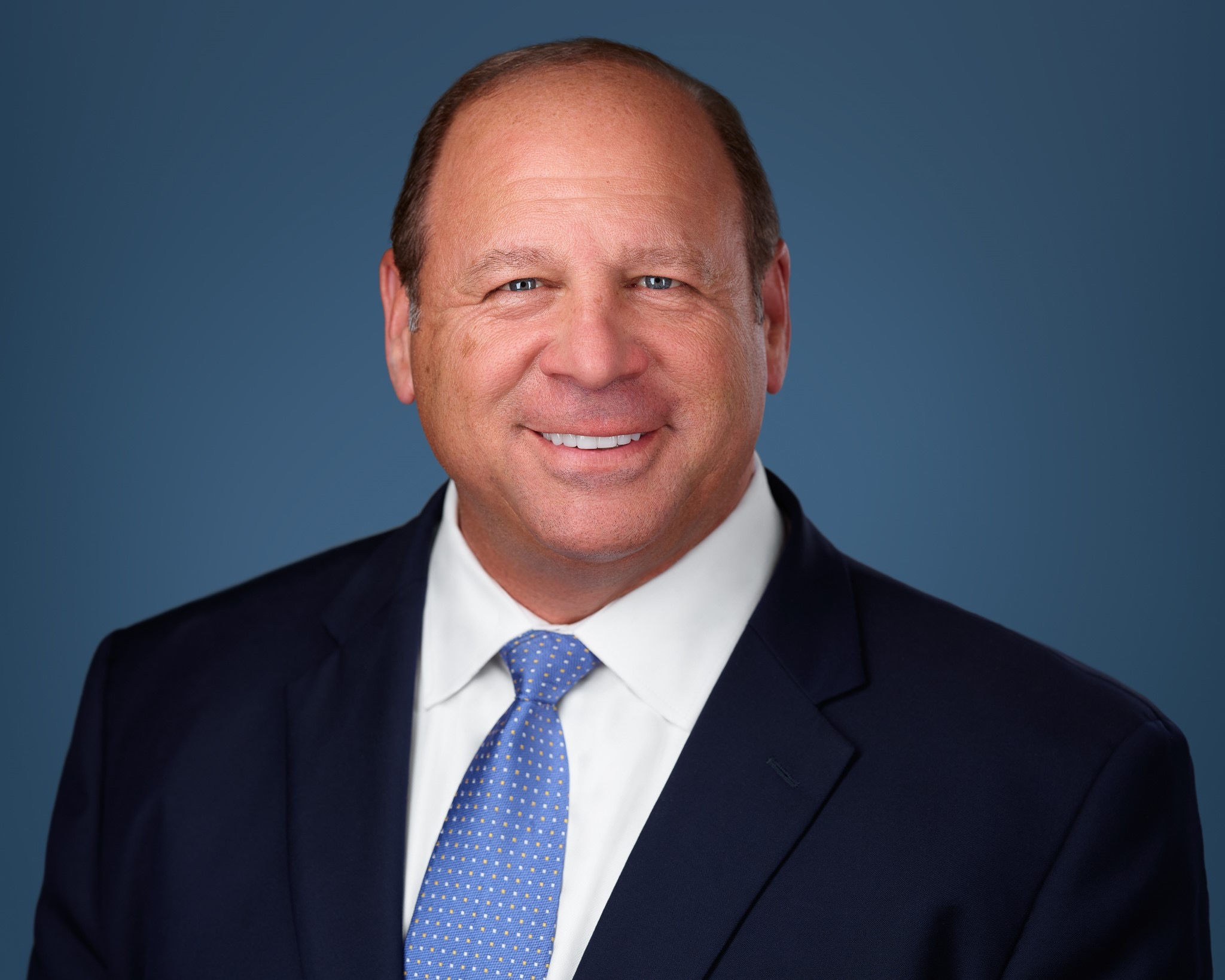

Member of the Texas House of Representatives from the 133rd district
- Incumbent
- Assumed office January 10, 2023
- Preceded by: Jim Murphy

Personal details
- Born: Emilio Fernando DeAyala; February 15, 1967 (age 59) Houston, Texas
- Party: Republican
- Spouse: Melissa DeAyala
- Children: 3
- Relatives: Kiki DeAyala (brother)
- Education: University of Texas at Austin (BBA); Southern Methodist University (JD)
- Occupation: Lawyer
- Website: Campaign website

Emilio Fernando "Mano" DeAyala (born February 15, 1967) is an American attorney and politician serving in the Texas House of Representatives where he represents Texas's 133rd House of Representatives district.

== Early life and education ==
Emilio Fernando DeAyala was born February 15, 1967, in Houston, Texas, to parents from Cuba. His father, Rafael DeAyala, was a member of Brigade 2506 and a survivor of the Bay of Pigs Invasion. His brother is Kiki DeAyala.

DeAyala graduated from the University of Texas at Austin's McCombs School of Business with a Bachelor of Business Administration in finance in December 1988. He then received a J.D. from Southern Methodist University.

== Career ==
In 2010, DeAyala joined the Houston-based law firm Buck Keenan LLP as a partner. His practice focuses on domestic and international commercial disputes.

Governor Greg Abbott appointed DeAyala to a six-year term on the Texas Board of Criminal Justice. During his tenure, he was chair of the Business and Finance Committee and as a trustee of the Windham School District. In July 2020, the Office of the United States Trade Representative appointed DeAyala as an arbitrator for trade disputes under the United States–Mexico–Canada Agreement (USMCA).

DeAyala was a member of the “C” Club of Houston, serving on its executive committee from 2012 to 2021 and as president in 2017. He was also a trustee of the Houston Region Business Coalition from 2020 to 2021. Since 2012, he has served on the board of the Hispanic Leadership Alliance, acting as chairman from 2017 to 2022.

DeAyala was formerly a board member of the Heritage Classical Academy, a prospective K-8 charter school in Houston, as well as a Spring Branch-Memorial Sports Association (SBMSA) youth football coach.

After he became a member of the Texas House of Representatives for the 88th Regular Legislative Session, DeAyala was appointed to the Appropriations Committee and Elections Committees. He was later named to the Select Study Committee on Sustainable Property Tax Relief during a subsequent special session.

After his reelection in 2024, DeAyala was appointed to the House Committee on Culture, Recreation & Tourism and was reappointed to the House Appropriations committee, serving as Vice Chairman of Articles I, IV & V.

== Electoral history ==
=== 2022 ===
Republican primary for Texas House of Representatives District 133
Party	Candidate	Votes	%
Republican	Shelley Torian Barineau	4,459	28.4
Republican	Mano DeAyala	4,252	27.1
Republican	Greg Travis	3,646	23.2
Republican	Will Franklin	2,072	13.2
Republican	Bert Keller	1,275	8.1
Total votes		15,704	100.0

Republican primary runoff for Texas House of Representatives District 133
Party	Candidate	Votes	%
Republican	Mano DeAyala	7,110	51.1
Republican	Shelley Torian Barineau	6,806	48.9
Total votes		13,916	100.0

General election for Texas House of Representatives District 133
Party	Candidate	Votes	%
Republican	Mano DeAyala	36,849	61.4
Democratic	Mohamad Maarouf	21,826	36.4
Libertarian	James Harren	1,297	2.2
Total votes		59,972	100.0
Republican hold			

=== 2024 ===
Republican primary for Texas House of Representatives District 133
Party	Candidate	Votes	%
Republican	Mano DeAyala	10,736	58.5
Republican	John Perez	7,607	41.5
Total votes		18,343	100.0

General election for Texas House of Representatives District 133
Party	Candidate	Votes	%
Republican	Mano DeAyala	53,979	100.0
Total votes		53,979	100.0
Republican hold			

=== 2026 ===
Republican primary for Texas House of Representatives District 133
Party	Candidate	Votes	%
Republican	Mano DeAyala	12,369	100.0
Total votes		12,369	100.0

General election for Texas House of Representatives District 133
Party	Candidate	Votes	%
Republican	Mano DeAyala	35,546	53.1
Democratic	Josh Wallenstein	31,391	46.9
Total votes		66,937	100.0
Republican hold			
