= Ron D. Givens =

American politician (1952–2023)

Member of the Texas House of Representatives from the 83rd district
- In office January 8, 1985 – January 10, 1989

Personal details
- Born: March 17, 1952 Lubbock, Texas, U.S.
- Died: September 25, 2023 (aged 71)
- Party: Republican
- Education: Huston–Tillotson University

Ron D. Givens (March 17, 1952 – September 25, 2023) was an American politician. He served as a Republican member for the 83rd district of the Texas House of Representatives.

== Life and career ==
Ron D. Givens was born in Lubbock, Texas, on March 17, 1952. He attended Huston–Tillotson University.

Givens was a real estate agent.

Givens served in the Texas House of Representatives from 1985 to 1989.

Ron D. Givens died on September 25, 2023, at the age of 71.
