= Stephanie Klick =

American politician

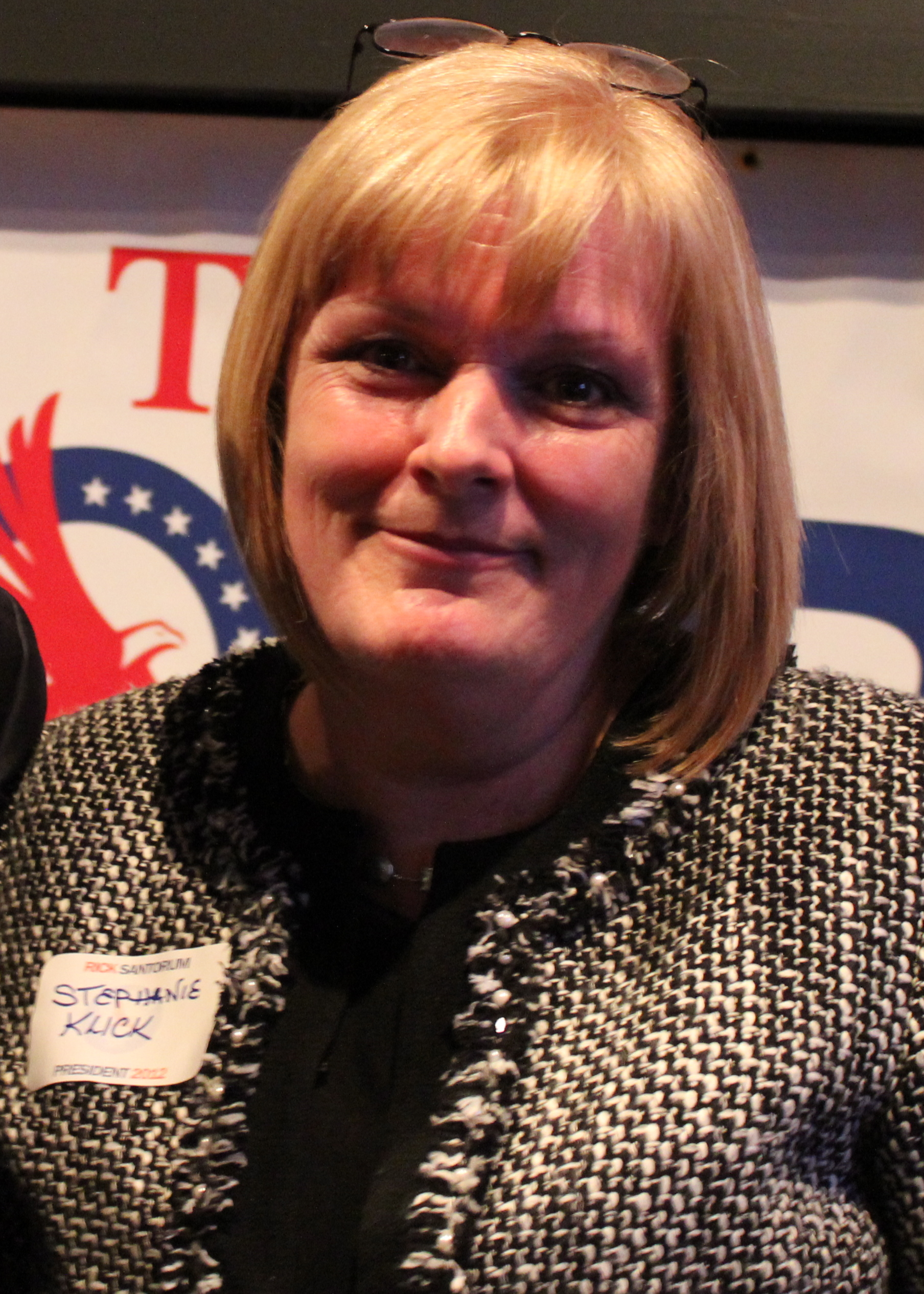

Majority Leader of the Texas House of Representatives
- In office August 16, 2019 – January 12, 2021
- Preceded by: Dustin Burrows
- Succeeded by: Jim Murphy

Member of the Texas House of Representatives from the 91st district
- In office January 8, 2013 – January 6, 2025
- Preceded by: Kelly Hancock
- Succeeded by: David Lowe

Personal details
- Born: Houston, Texas, U.S.
- Party: Republican
- Spouse: Don
- Education: Texas Christian University (BS); Texas A&M University (MPH)

Stephanie Klick is an American nurse and politician. A Republican, she represented the 91st district in the Texas House of Representatives from 2013 to 2025. She served one term as Majority Leader of the Texas House's GOP Caucus.

== Education and nursing career ==
Klick earned a Bachelor of Science in nursing from Texas Christian University in 1981 and a Master of Public Health from Texas A&M College of Veterinary Medicine & Biomedical Sciences in 1983.

Klick worked as a nurse and nursing supervisor at North Hills Medical Center for 30 years.

== Political career and electoral history ==
In November 2012, Klick was elected to represent House District 91, which includes parts of Tarrant County. She served as the chairwoman of the Tarrant County Party for six years. Klick has sponsored bills to legalize medical marijuana.

Klick was defeated by David Lowe in the Republican primary runoff on May 28, 2024 by 1,055 votes, Lowe having received 4,535 early and Election Day votes (56.58%) to Klick's 3,480 votes (43.42%).

Texas House of Representatives
Preceded by Kelly Hancock	Member of the Texas House of Representatives from the 91st district 2013–2025	Succeeded by David Lowe
Preceded by Dustin Burrows	Majority Leader of the Texas House of Representatives; 2019–2021	Succeeded by Jim Murphy
