= Frank Mayborn =

American newspaper publisher and broadcaster (1903–1987)

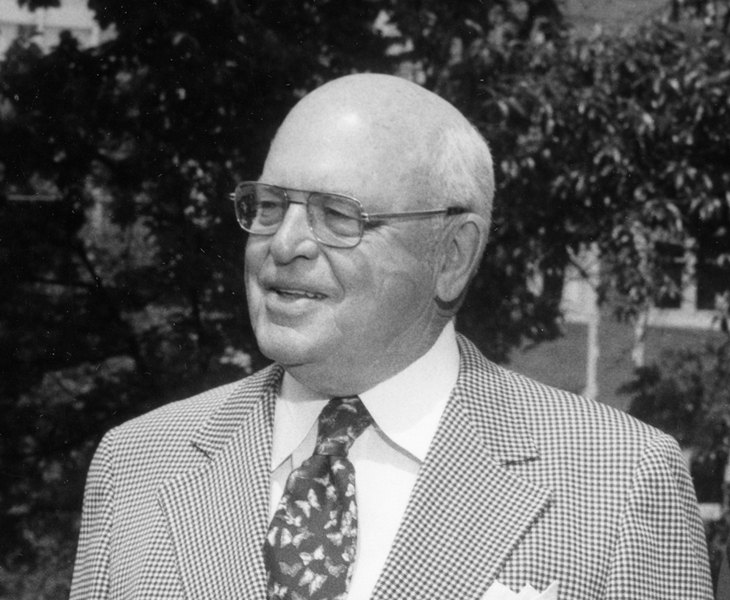
- Mayborn in 1985
- Born: December 7, 1903; Akron, Ohio, US
- Died: 16 May 1987 (aged 83); Temple, Texas, US
- Education: University of Colorado (BA)
- Occupations: Newspaper publisher, editor, soldier, news broadcasters
- Years active: 1939-1987
- Notable work: Frank Mayborn Enterprises, Inc development of Temple, Texas and Bell County
- Political party: Democratic (1945-1973) Republican (1973–1987)
- Spouse: Ruth Whitesides (m. 1929–1946) Wythel Killen (m. 1947–1972) Anyse Sue White (m. 1981–1987)
- Awards: Creighton W. Abrams Medal (1979); Fort Hood Commander’s Award for Public Service (1985)
- Honours: Mayborn Award for Community Leadership
- Military career
- Allegiance: United States
- Branch: United States Army
- Service years: 1942–1946
- Rank: Major

Frank Willis Mayborn (December 7, 1903 – May 16, 1987) was an American philanthropist, soldier, newspapers editor, publisher and broadcaster. He is best known for the crucial role he played in Bell County and Temple city's development in Austin, Texas.

== Early life ==
Mayborn was born in Akron, Ohio, to his father Ward Carlton Mayborn, a media personnel who was also a newspaper publisher of E.W. Scripps newspaper conglomerate, and his mother Nellie Childs Welton. In 1910, his parents relocated to Denver, Colorado, and later moved again in 1919 to Dallas, Texas.

== Newspaper and publishing career ==
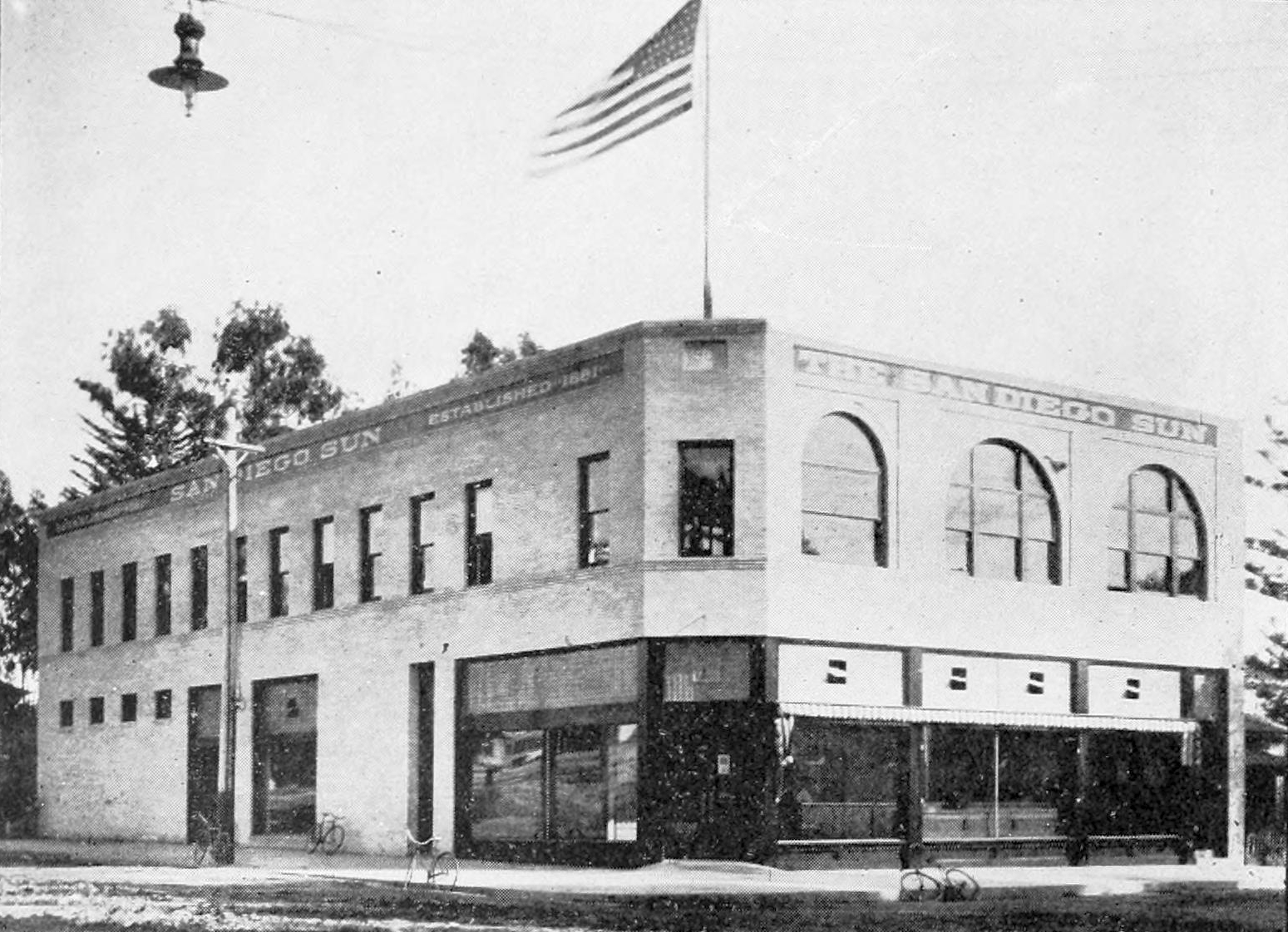
The San Diego Sun newspaper in 1908-1935

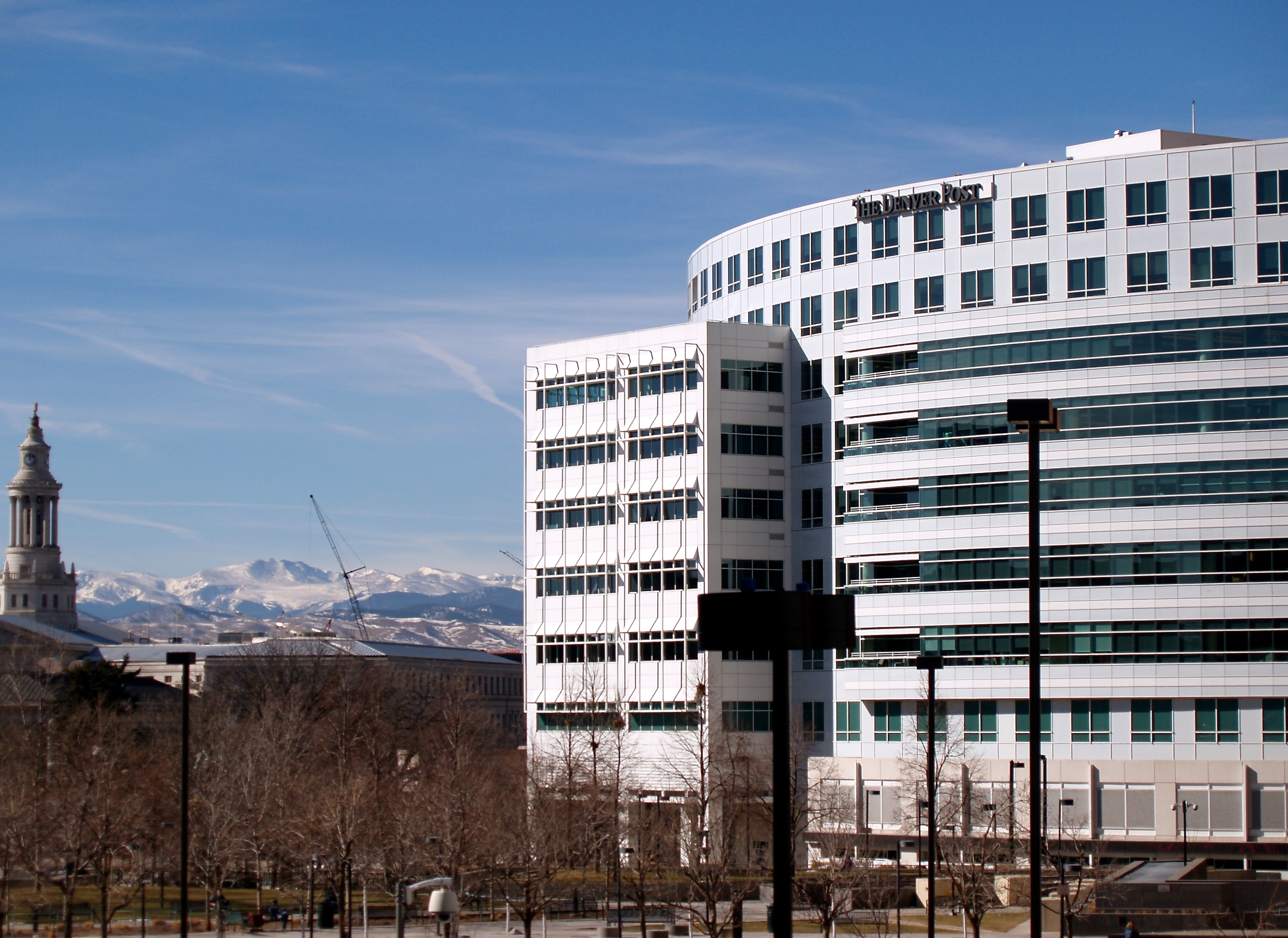
Denver Post newspaper

Mayborn started working with newspapers when he was in high school as a stringer at Denver Post, part-time and summer worker at San Diego Sun and Dallas Dispatch, and as a correspondent in United Press before becoming a publisher. He bought a publishing company in 1929 known as Telegram Publishing company of Temple Daily Telegram together with his father and brother in Temple, acquired the Sherman Democrat in 1945 before moving on in 1952 to purchase the Killeen Herald in 1959, and owned the Taylor Daily Press company.

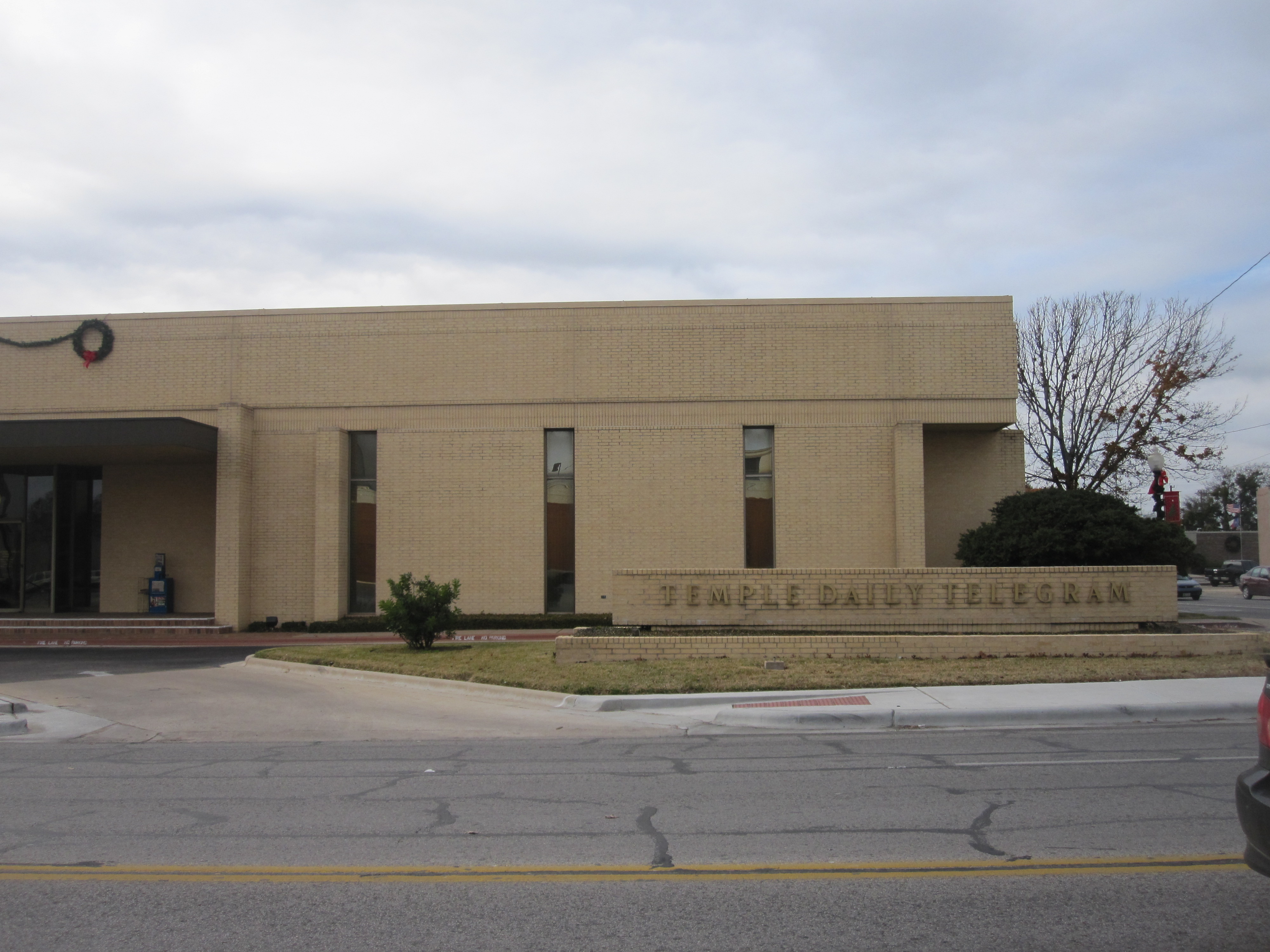
Temple Telegram owned by Frank Mayborn Enterprises from 1940 to 1987

After graduating from high school he worked as an advertising salesman for the Dallas News and held several positions in the Northern Texas Traction Company in Fort Worth.

Mayborn served as an editor of Daily Telegram from 1929 to 1946, and later became the publisher and editor in 1946. In 1952, he was the operations manager of Sherman Democrat of the Daily Herald, previously known as the Killeen Herald, in 1974 the Taylor Press was sold together with the Sherman Democrat sold in 1977, he acquired the Frank Mayborn Enterprises, Inc, a newspaper of publishing company in 1978.

== Media and broadcasting career ==
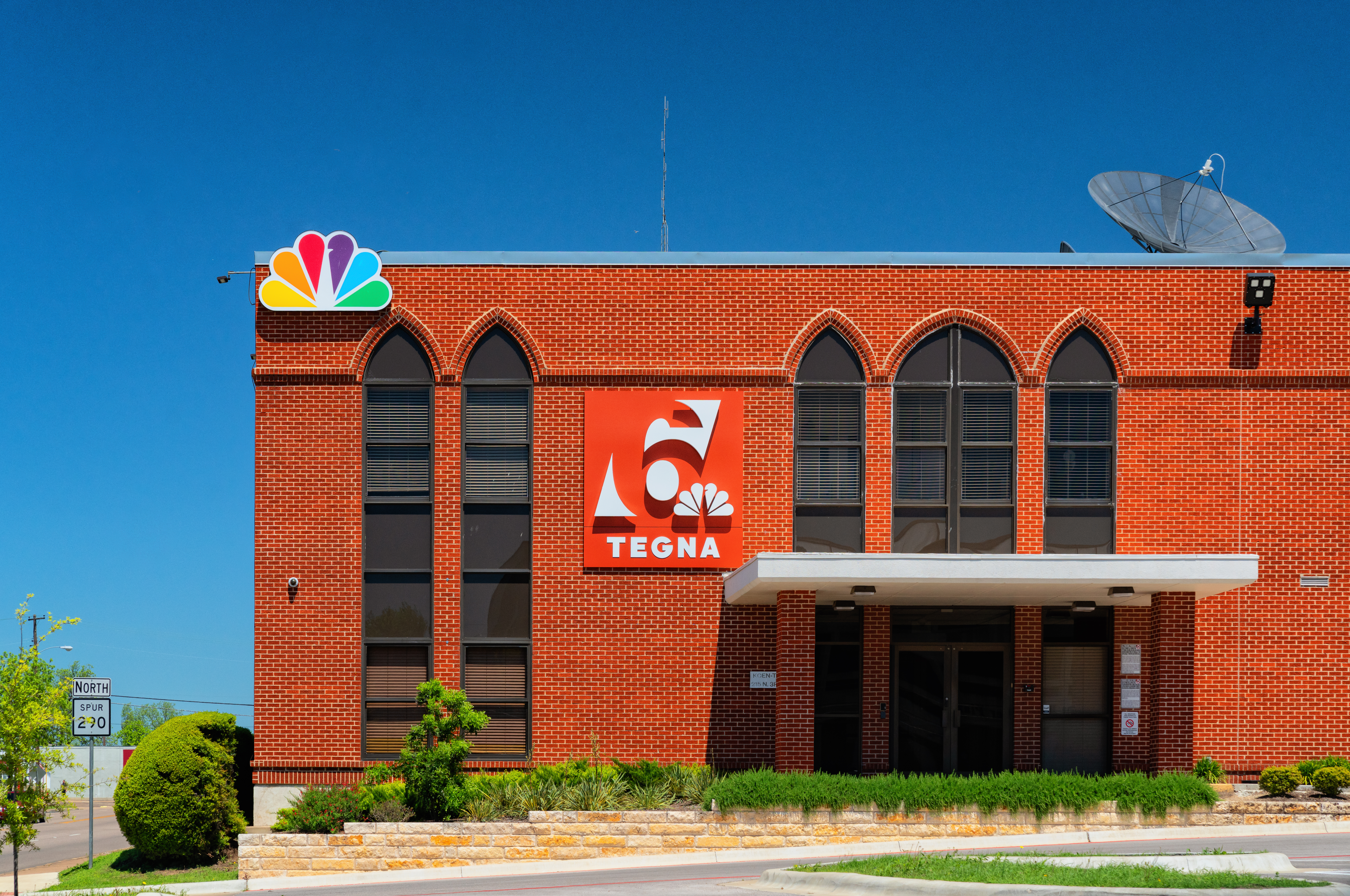
former Frank Mayborn Enterprises, Inc radio station KCEN TV, owned from (1978-1987). 2009 bought by NBC

Mayborn was a communication member and pioneer in media starting a radio station in KTEM at Temple in 1936, and owned WMAK radio at Nashville in 1945 and the KCEN-TV station in 1952 resided at Temple, Texas.

== Mayborn and Sue relations in Baylor ==
After Mayborn's death, Sue became the owner and president of Frank Mayborn Enterprises, Inc. in 1987 including other subsidiaries of Mayborn.

Mayborn funded The W. R. Poage Legislative Library at Baylor University.

== Role in military and their affairs ==
Mayborn started working with the military in 1939 and organized military affairs as the Temple Chamber of Commerce president, chaired the military affairs committee, and worked for the War Projects Committee formed with the Temple Chamber of Commerce. He was selected to work at Central Texas of Hood camp in the army, where he and the committees relocated McCloskey General Hospital and a military installation defense plant to Temple.

Mayborn later joined the military in 1942–43 as a public relations official and worked with Dwight D. Eisenhower as a chief assistant of public relation office in United States Army. He was awarded a Bronze Star before retiring in 1946 as a major, but did not stop activities in military affairs.

Mayborn accompanied Bruce C. Clarke to South Asia, Vietnam, in 1968 for a fact-finding tour, and before his return, he was asked to accompany Lyndon B. Johnson, who later served as the 36th president of the United States of America. Before leaving the military, he received the Creighton W. Abrams Medal in 1979 for his contributions to the United States military and the Fort Hood Commander's Award for Public Service.

== Political involvements ==
Mayborn became involved in Democratic party political issues, and developed relationships with some leading Democrats members through his service as a newsman and advocate in Texas, such as John B. Connally, William Robert Poage, Jesse H. Jones, and Samuel T. Rayburn.

In 1946, he won the member seat of the Texas Democratic State Committee election.
