= Frank Mayborn Enterprises =

Domestic profit newspaper publisher

Frank Mayborn Enterprises, Inc
- Status: Active
- Traded as: Domestic for profit and newspapers publishers of: Killeen Daily Herald; Temple Daily Telegram
- Founded: 1978
- Founder: Frank Mayborn
- Country of origin: United States
- Headquarters location: Temple, Texas
- Distribution: Newspapers
- Key people: FW Mayborn (man editor 1939-1987); Walter Mayborn
- Publication types: Newspaper Ethics, sale, intelligence data and printing
- Nonfiction topics: News, sport, politics
- Fiction genres: News articles, sports, history, politics, sales and intelligence data
- Imprints: F W. Mayborn
- Owner: Frank Mayborn
- No. of employees: 300

Frank Mayborn Enterprises is a domestic profit industry in Texas. It was the founder and publisher of Killeen Daily Herald newspaper and Temple Daily Telegram.

== Formations ==
Mayborn enterprises is formed in December 1978 and was registered as a domestic for profit cooperation in Texas States Secretariat by Frank Mayborn. The industry based on Publishing newspapers with more than 300 employees with $42.09 million having five companies.

== Sources ==
- "FRANK MAYBORN ENTERPRISES, INC., Temple, TEXAS, TX 76501 - Govcb.com". www.govcb.com.
