= Zella, Texas =

Ghost town in Texas, US

Zella
- Ghost towns
- Location in Texas
- Coordinates: 28.5630434°N 98.7930801°W
- Country: United States
- State: Texas
- County: McMullen
- Elevation: 374 ft (114 m)

Zella is a ghost town in McMullen County, Texas, United States.

== History ==
Zella is situated on Texas State Highway 97. It was named for Zella Bland, daughter of settler Howard Bland. It was settled in 1913 on the route of the San Antonio, Uvalde and Gulf Railroad. The Zella Townsite Company constructed a hotel, a rail depot, and a well, circulating brochures to attract settlers. A post office was founded in 1914, but closed in 1916, by which point the town had been mostly abandoned due to drought and the lack of promised irrigation facilities. The community served as a shipping point for cattle drovers until 1959. Some homes still stand, as well as the hotel, which is now used as lodging for deer hunters.
