= David Lowe (Texas politician) =

American politician

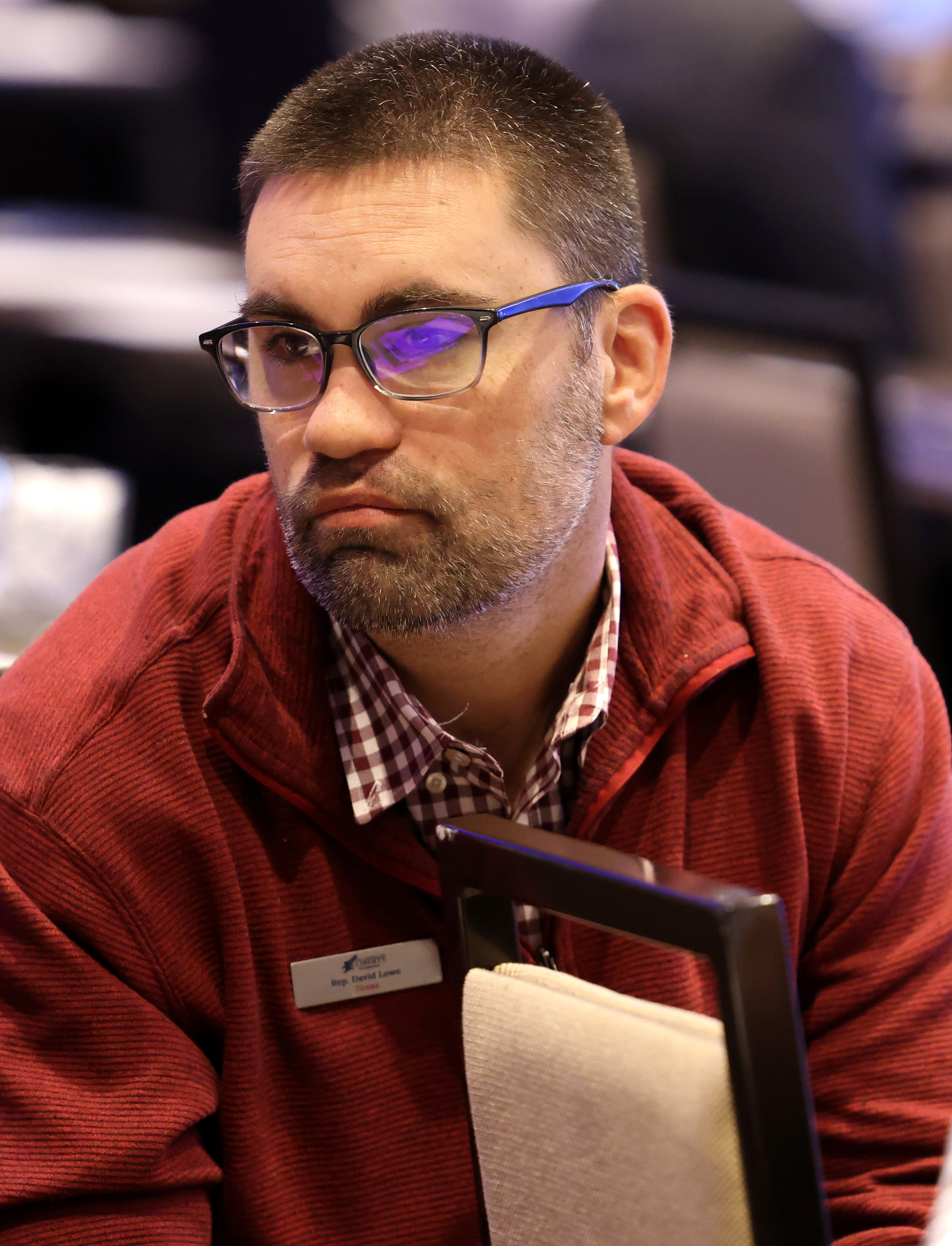
- Lowe at the 2024 Hazlitt Summit hosted by Young Americans for Liberty Foundation

Member of the Texas House of Representatives from the 91st district
- Incumbent
- Assumed office January 14, 2025
- Preceded by: Stephanie Klick

Personal details
- Born: June 4, 1983 (age 43) Dallas, Texas
- Party: Republican
- Education: American Military University
- Website: Campaign website

David Lowe is an American politician who was elected member of the Texas House of Representatives for the 91st district in 2024. A member of the Republican Party, he defeated Stephanie Klick in the primary election.
