= Jim Murphy (Texas politician) =

Texas businessman and state legislator

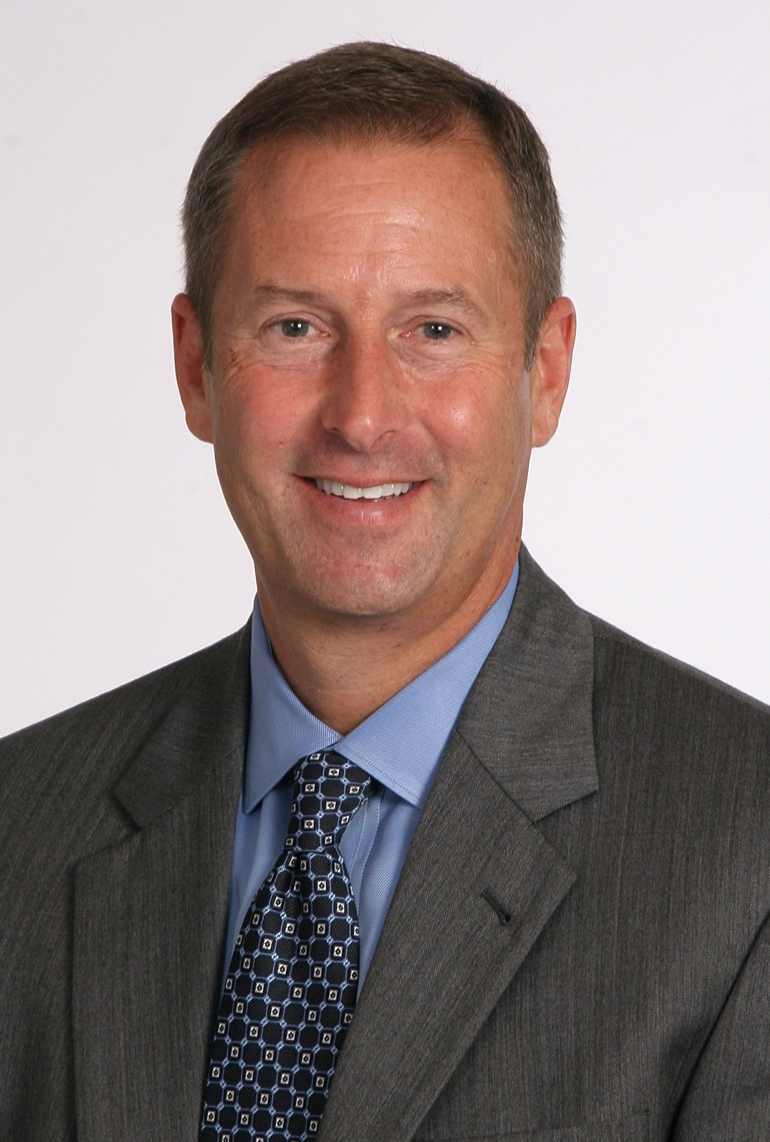
- Murphy in 2010

Majority Leader of the Texas House of Representatives
- In office January 12, 2021 – January 10, 2023
- Preceded by: Stephanie Klick
- Succeeded by: Craig Goldman

Member of the Texas House of Representatives from the 133rd district
- In office January 11, 2011 – January 10, 2023
- Preceded by: Kristi Thibaut
- Succeeded by: Mano DeAyala
- In office January 9, 2007 – January 13, 2009
- Preceded by: Joe Nixon
- Succeeded by: Kristi Thibaut

Personal details
- Born: James Richard Murphy; December 8, 1957 (age 68) Houston, Texas, U.S.
- Party: Republican
- Spouse: Kathleen Pace
- Children: 2
- Education: University of Texas, Austin (BA)

James Richard Murphy (born December 8, 1957) is an American businessman and politician who served as the majority leader of the Texas House of Representatives from 2021 to 2023. A member of the Republican Party, he represented the 133rd district from 2007 and 2009, and again from 2011 to 2023.

Murphy won a fifth nonconsecutive term in the state House in the general election held on November 8, 2016.

== Political career ==
=== Multi-billion corporate tax incentive program ===
In 2021, Murphy pushed for legislation that would extend a multibillion-dollar corporate tax incentive program in Texas by ten years and expanded the incentives given to companies. Investigative reporting by the Houston Chronicle revealed that nearly all applicants for the corporate tax incentive program had their applications approved, that dozens of companies failed to fulfill its pledges, and that some companies had already completed the projects that they had applied to the program for.

=== Committee appointments ===
Legislative Session	Committee
80th (2007)	Urban Affairs (vice-chair), Transportation, Rules and Resolutions
82nd (2011)	Manufacturing, Interim (chair), Partnership Advisory Commission (chair), Economic and Small Business Development, Ways and Means
83rd (2013)	Economic and Small Business Development - S/C Manufacturing (chair), Partnership Advisory Commission (chair), Education Policy for a Skilled Workforce (cochair), Economic and Small Business Development, Higher Education
84th (2015)	Corrections (chair), Ways and Means
85th (2017)	Special Purpose Districts (Chairman), Ways and Means, Partnership Advisory Commission (Vice-Chairman)

Murphy served on the Corrections and Ways and Means committees. In 2007, he was elected president of the freshman class in the House. During his first term, he authored and passed 15 bills, the most by any first-time member. During the 84th Legislative Session, Murphy was elected Texas House Republican Caucus Floor Leader.

== Personal life ==
Murphy is married to Kathleen J. Pace-Murphy, a professor at the Houston School of Nursing within the University of Texas System. Pace-Murphy is a geriatric nurse practitioner. The Murphys have two sons.

Texas House of Representatives
Preceded by Joe Nixon	Member of the Texas House of Representatives from the 133rd district 2007–2009	Succeeded by Kristi Thibaut
Preceded by Kristi Thibaut	Member of the Texas House of Representatives from the 133rd district 2011–2023	Succeeded by Mano DeAyala
Preceded by Stephanie Klick	Majority Leader of the Texas House of Representatives; 2021–2023	Succeeded by Craig Goldman
