= Temple Daily Telegram =

Newspaper in Temple, Texas

- Type: Daily newspaper
- Format: Broadsheet
- Owner(s): Frank Mayborn Enterprises, Inc.
- Publisher: Sue Mayborn
- Editor: Sue Mayborn
- Founded: 1907
- Headquarters: Temple, Texas
- Circulation: 7,850 (as of 2023)
- Website: tdtnews.com

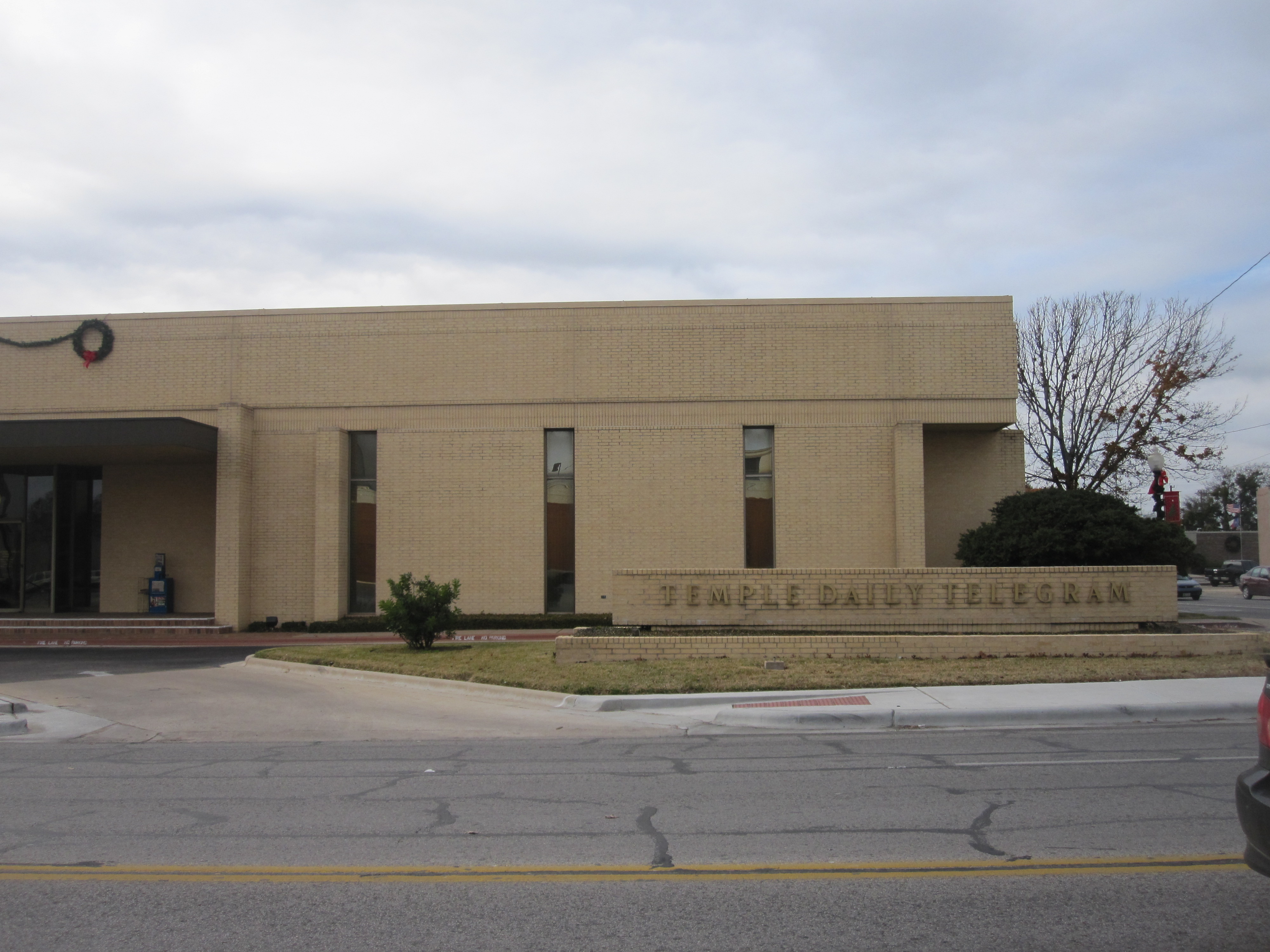
Temple Daily Telegram, Temple, Texas

The Temple Daily Telegram is the daily newspaper of Temple, Texas, serving Central Texas since 1907. The Telegram is locally owned and operated by Frank Mayborn Enterprises, under editor and publisher Sue Mayborn, the widow of Frank Mayborn.

On Sunday, November 18, 2007, the newspaper unveiled a Texas Historical Commission marker to commemorate the centennial of the publication.

== History ==
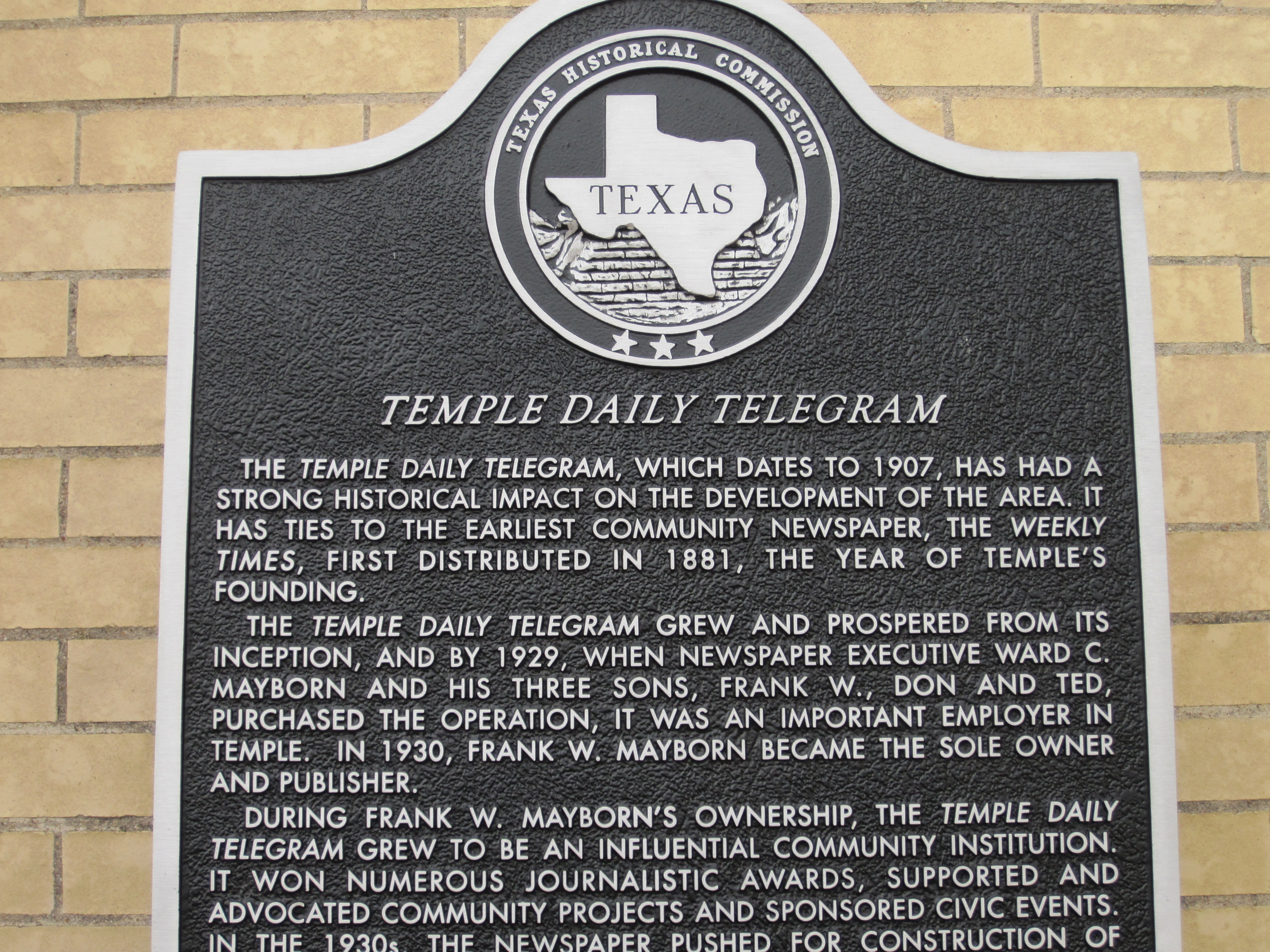
Texas Historical Commission marker for Temple Daily Telegram

The newspaper emerged from a mixture of publications circulating in Temple between 1881 and 1907. In 1907, E. K. Williams and J. F. Crouch crafted the Temple Times into the Temple Daily Telegram, the city's first daily newspaper.

On Oct. 29, 1929, Ward C. Mayborn and his three sons, Frank, Don and Ted, bought the Telegram. When Ward left in late 1930 to become the general manager of the Baltimore News-American, Frank W. Mayborn became publisher of the newspaper , a position he held until his death in 1987. Sue Mayborn, his third wife who had worked with him for many years, beginning as his secretary, has run the paper since that time.

Norman L. Richardson, an award-winning journalist originally from Louisiana who was known for his coverage of hurricanes, was the executive editor of the Daily Telegram from 1974 to 1979.

== See also ==
- List of newspapers in Texas

== Resources ==
- Temple Daily Telegram homepage
- Historic issues of the Temple Daily Telegram from 1907-1922
