= List of NFL career punts leaders =

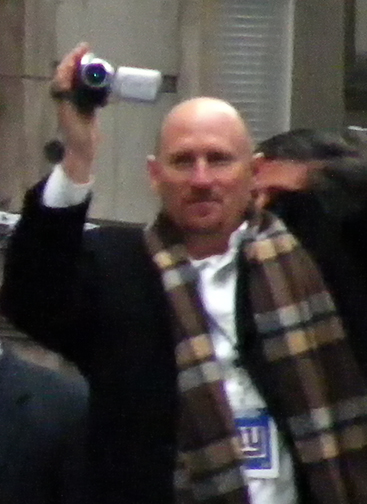
Jeff Feagles holds the NFL career record for most punts with 1,713.

In American football, a punt is a kick that is performed after a player (most often a punter) drops the ball from their hands and kicks it prior to it hitting the ground. Record keeping for punts in the National Football League (NFL) goes back to 1939.

To be eligible for career-long rankings, a player must have a minimum of 250 punts. After his 22 seasons as an NFL punter, Jeff Feagles retired with 1,713 punts, the NFL's career record. Feagles is the only punter to eclipse 1,500 career punts; a total of 24 players have reached 1,000 punts during their career. Feagles set the career record for total punts while playing for the New York Giants in 2005, when he recorded his 1,368th, surpassing Sean Landeta. With 1,168 punts for the Baltimore Ravens, Sam Koch has the most career punts for any individual franchise. The Kansas City Chiefs and Las Vegas Raiders are the only two franchises with two different players to record 1,000 punts for their teams.

Punting is a strategy in American football designed to put the opposing team at a disadvantage by dealing them with poor field position. As such, landing punts close to the receiving team's end zone is highly desired by the punting team. While techniques and strategies (such as the coffin corner punt) are utilized in this context, a punt that enters the end zone can result in a touchback if downed by the receiving team without the ball being advanced beyond their goal line. When a touchback occurs, the ball is placed at the 20-yard line. As such, the ratio of inside-the-20 punts to touchbacks is of consideration. The NFL began officially tracking punts landed inside the 20-yard line and those resulting in touchbacks in 1976.

Feagles holds the record for punts landing inside opponents' 20-yard line with 554. Shane Lechler holds the record for punting touchbacks with 178.

== Career punts leaders ==
Key
^	Inducted into the Pro Football Hall of Fame
*	Denotes player who is still active

Based on at least 1,000 punts.

Rank	Player	Team(s) by season	Punts
1	Jeff Feagles	New England Patriots (1988–1989); Philadelphia Eagles (1990–1993); Arizona Cardinals (1994–1997); Seattle Seahawks (1998–2002); New York Giants (2003–2009)	1,713
2	Andy Lee	San Francisco 49ers (2004–2014); Cleveland Browns (2015); Carolina Panthers (2016); Arizona Cardinals (2017–2022)	1,466
3	Shane Lechler	Oakland Raiders (2000–2012); Houston Texans (2013–2017)	1,444
4	Sean Landeta	New York Giants (1985–1993); Los Angeles / St. Louis Rams (1993–1996, 2003–2004); Tampa Bay Buccaneers (1997); Green Bay Packers (1998); Philadelphia Eagles (1999–2002, 2005)	1,401
5	Brad Maynard	New York Giants (1997–2000); Chicago Bears (2001–2010); Cleveland Browns (2011)	1,339
6	Lee Johnson	Houston Oilers (1985–1987); Cleveland Browns (1987–1988); Cincinnati Bengals (1988–1998); New England Patriots (1999–2001); Minnesota Vikings (2001); Philadelphia Eagles (2002)	1,226
7	Dustin Colquitt	Kansas City Chiefs (2005–2019); Pittsburgh Steelers (2020); Jacksonville Jaguars (2020); Atlanta Falcons (2021); Cleveland Browns (2021)	1,198
8	Chris Gardocki	Chicago Bears (1991–1994); Indianapolis Colts (1995–1998); Cleveland Browns (1999–2003); Pittsburgh Steelers (2004–2006)	1,177
9	Sam Koch	Baltimore Ravens (2006–2021)	1,168
10	Donnie Jones	Seattle Seahawks (2004); Miami Dolphins (2005–2006); St. Louis Rams (2007–2011); Houston Texans (2012); Philadelphia Eagles (2013–2017); Los Angeles Chargers (2018)	1,157
11	Dave Jennings	New York Giants (1974–1984); New York Jets (1985–1987)	1,154
12	Chris Mohr	Tampa Bay Buccaneers (1989); Buffalo Bills (1991–2000); Atlanta Falcons (2001–2004)	1,152
13	Craig Hentrich	Green Bay Packers (1994–1997); Tennessee Oilers / Titans (1999–2009)	1,150
14	Matt Turk	Washington Redskins (1995–1999); Miami Dolphins (2000–2001, 2003–2005); New York Jets (2002); St. Louis Rams (2006); Houston Texans (2007–2011); Jacksonville Jaguars (2011)	1,143
15	Rohn Stark	Baltimore Colts (1982–1983); Indianapolis Colts (1984–1994); Pittsburgh Steelers (1995); Carolina Panthers (1996); Seattle Seahawks (1997)	1,141
16	Bryan Barker	Kansas City Chiefs (1990–1993); Philadelphia Eagles (1994); Jacksonville Jaguars (1995–2000); Washington Redskins (2001–2003); Green Bay Packers (2004); St. Louis Rams (2005)	1,132
17	Mark Royals	Philadelphia Eagles (1987); St. Louis Cardinals (1987); Tampa Bay Buccaneers (1990–1991, 1999–2001); Pittsburgh Steelers (1992–1994); Detroit Lions (1995–1996); New Orleans Saints (1997–1998); Miami Dolphins (2002–2003); Jacksonville Jaguars (2003)	1,116
18	John James	Atlanta Falcons (1972–1981); Detroit Lions (1982); Houston Oilers (1982–1984)	1,083
19	Jerrel Wilson	Kansas City Chiefs (1963–1977); New England Patriots (1978	1,072
20	Brian Hansen	New Orleans Saints (1984–1988); New England Patriots (1990); Cleveland Browns (1991–1993); New York Jets (1994–1998); Washington Redskins (1999)	1,057
21	Dan Stryzinski	Pittsburgh Steelers (1990–1991); Tampa Bay Buccaneers (1992–1994); Atlanta Falcons (1995–2000); Kansas City Chiefs (2001–2002); New York Jets (2003)	1,055
22	Johnny Hekker	St. Louis / Los Angeles Rams (2012–2021); Carolina Panthers (2022–2024); Tennessee Titans (2025); Minnesota Vikings (2026)	1,053
23	Ray Guy^	Oakland / Los Angeles Raiders (1973–1986)	1,049
24	Rich Camarillo	New England Patriots (1981–1987); Los Angeles Rams (1988); Phoenix Cardinals (1989–1993); Houston Oilers (1994–1995); Oakland Raiders (1996)	1,027
25	Kevin Huber	Cincinnati Bengals (2009–2022)	1,011
26	Thomas Morstead*	New Orleans Saints (2009–2020); New York Jets (2021, 2023–2024); Miami Dolphins (2022); San Francisco 49ers (2025); Tennessee Titans (2026–present)	1,009
27	Brett Kern	Denver Broncos (2008–2009); Tennessee Titans (2009–2021); Philadelphia Eagles (2022)	1,006
28	Mike Horan	Philadelphia Eagles (1984–1985); Denver Broncos (1986–1992); New York Giants (1993–1996); St. Louis Rams (1997, 1999); Chicago Bears (1998)	1,003
Statistics accurate through the 2026 NFL season and gathered from Pro-Football-Reference.

== Most punts inside the 20-yard line ==
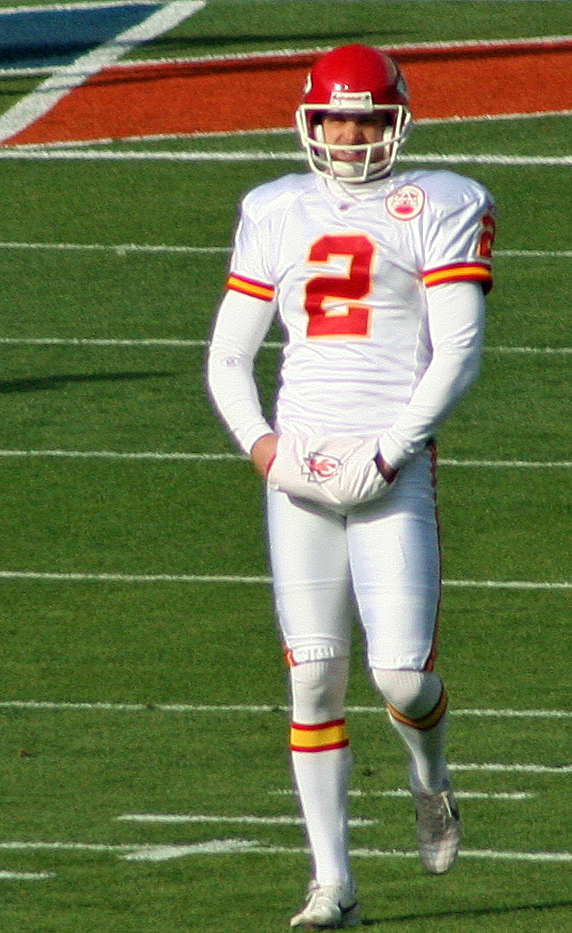
Dustin Colquitt has the second-most career inside-20 punts in NFL history.

Key
*	Denotes player who is still active

Based on 300 career punts inside the 20-yard line

Rank	Player	Team(s) by season	In-20	Pct
1	Jeff Feagles	New England Patriots (1988–1989); Philadelphia Eagles (1990–1993); Arizona Cardinals (1994–1997); Seattle Seahawks (1998–2002); New York Giants (2003–2009)	554	32.3%
2	Dustin Colquitt	Kansas City Chiefs (2005–2019); Pittsburgh Steelers (2020); Jacksonville Jaguars (2020); Atlanta Falcons (2021); Cleveland Browns (2021)	483	40.3%
3	Andy Lee	San Francisco 49ers (2004–2014); Cleveland Browns (2015); Carolina Panthers (2016); Arizona Cardinals (2017–2022)	476	32.5%
4	Shane Lechler	Oakland Raiders (2000–2012); Houston Texans (2013–2017)	469	32.5%
5	Sam Koch	Baltimore Ravens (2006–2021)	453	38.8%
6	Brad Maynard	New York Giants (1997–2000); Chicago Bears (2001–2010); Cleveland Browns (2011)	439	32.8%
7	Johnny Hekker	St. Louis / Los Angeles Rams (2012–2021); Carolina Panthers (2022–2024); Tennessee Titans (2025); Minnesota Vikings (2026)	402	38.2%
8	Craig Hentrich	Green Bay Packers (1994–1997); Tennessee Oilers / Titans (1999–2009)	399	34.7%
9	Brett Kern	Denver Broncos (2008–2009); Tennessee Titans (2009–2021); Philadelphia Eagles (2022)	396	39.7%
10	Sean Landeta	New York Giants (1985–1993); Los Angeles / St. Louis Rams (1993–1996, 2003–2004); Tampa Bay Buccaneers (1997); Green Bay Packers (1998); Philadelphia Eagles (1999–2002, 2005)	381	27.2%
11	Donnie Jones	Seattle Seahawks (2004); Miami Dolphins (2005–2006); St. Louis Rams (2007–2011); Houston Texans (2012); Philadelphia Eagles (2013–2017); Los Angeles Chargers (2018)	379	32.8%
12	Thomas Morstead*	New Orleans Saints (2009–2020); New York Jets (2021, 2023–2024); Miami Dolphins (2022); San Francisco 49ers (2025); Tennessee Titans (2026–present)	376	37.3%
13	Matt Turk	Washington Redskins (1995–1999); Miami Dolphins (2000–2001, 2003–2005); New York Jets (2002); St. Louis Rams (2006); Houston Texans (2007–2011); Jacksonville Jaguars (2011)	373	32.6%
14	Bryan Anger*	Jacksonville Jaguars (2012–2015); Tampa Bay Buccaneers (2016–2018); Houston Texans (2019–2020); Dallas Cowboys (2021-present)	352	36.8%
15	Kevin Huber	Cincinnati Bengals (2009–2022)	346	34.2%
16	Tress Way*	Washington Redskins / Football Team / Commanders (2014-present)	338	38.8%
17	Sam Martin*	Detroit Lions (2013–2019); Denver Broncos (2020–2021); Buffalo Bills (2022–2024); Carolina Panthers (2025-present)	331	39%
18	Bryan Barker	Kansas City Chiefs (1990–1993); Philadelphia Eagles (1994); Jacksonville Jaguars (1995–2000); Washington Redskins (2001–2003); Green Bay Packers (2004); St. Louis Rams (2005)	325	28.7%
19	Chris Gardocki	Chicago Bears (1991–1994); Indianapolis Colts (1995–1998); Cleveland Browns (1999–2003); Pittsburgh Steelers (2004–2006)	322	27.4%
20	Lee Johnson	Houston Oilers (1985–1987); Cleveland Browns (1987–1988); Cincinnati Bengals (1988–1998); New England Patriots (1999–2001); Minnesota Vikings (2001); Philadelphia Eagles (2002)	318	25.9%
21	Jon Ryan	Green Bay Packers (2006–2007); Seattle Seahawks (2008–2017)	311	34%
Statistics accurate through the 2026 NFL season and gathered from The Football Database.

== Career punting touchbacks leaders ==
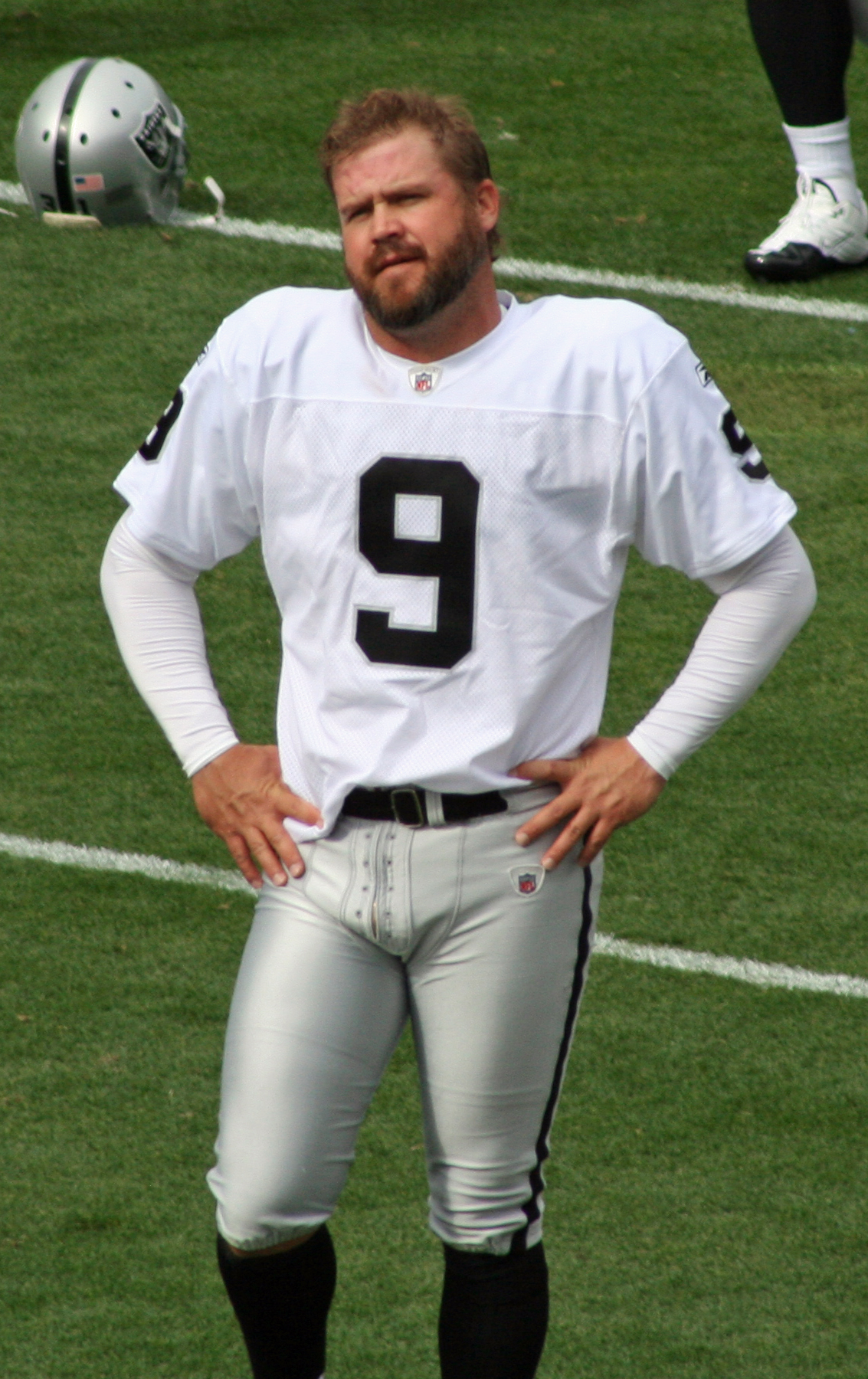
Shane Lechler has the most career punts resulting in touchbacks in NFL history.

Key
^	Inducted into the Pro Football Hall of Fame
*	Denotes player who is still active

Based on 100 career punting touchbacks

Rank	Player	Team(s) by season	TB
1	Shane Lechler	Oakland Raiders (2000–2012); Houston Texans (2013–2017)	178
2	Sean Landeta	New York Giants (1985–1993); Los Angeles / St. Louis Rams (1993–1996, 2003–2004); Tampa Bay Buccaneers (1997); Green Bay Packers (1998); Philadelphia Eagles (1999–2002, 2005)	166
3	Craig Hentrich	Green Bay Packers (1994–1997); Tennessee Oilers / Titans (1999–2009)	142
3	Lee Johnson	Houston Oilers (1985–1987); Cleveland Browns (1987–1988); Cincinnati Bengals (1988–1998); New England Patriots (1999–2001); Minnesota Vikings (2001); Philadelphia Eagles (2002)	142
5	Rohn Stark	Baltimore Colts (1982–1983); Indianapolis Colts (1984–1994); Pittsburgh Steelers (1995); Carolina Panthers (1996); Seattle Seahawks (1997)	133
6	Andy Lee	San Francisco 49ers (2004–2014); Cleveland Browns (2015); Carolina Panthers (2016); Arizona Cardinals (2017–2022)	132
7	Matt Turk	Washington Redskins (1995–1999); Miami Dolphins (2000–2001, 2003–2005); New York Jets (2002); St. Louis Rams (2006); Houston Texans (2007–2011); Jacksonville Jaguars (2011)	129
8	Ray Guy^	Oakland / Los Angeles Raiders (1973–1986)	128
9	Jeff Feagles	New England Patriots (1988–1989); Philadelphia Eagles (1990–1993); Arizona Cardinals (1994–1997); Seattle Seahawks (1998–2002); New York Giants (2003–2009)	127
10	Reggie Roby	Miami Dolphins (1983–1992); Washington Redskins (1993–1994); Tampa Bay Buccaneers (1995); Houston / Tennessee Oilers (1996–1997); San Francisco 49ers (1998)	112
11	Bryan Barker	Kansas City Chiefs (1990–1993); Philadelphia Eagles (1994); Jacksonville Jaguars (1995–2000); Washington Redskins (2001–2003); Green Bay Packers (2004); St. Louis Rams (2005)	108
12	Todd Sauerbrun	Chicago Bears (1995–1999); Kansas City Chiefs (2000); Carolina Panthers (2001–2004); Denver Broncos (2005–2006, 2007); New England Patriots (2006)	108
13	Rich Camarillo	New England Patriots (1981–1987); Los Angeles Rams (1988); Phoenix Cardinals (1989–1993); Houston Oilers (1994–1995); Oakland Raiders (1996)	107
14	Brian Hansen	New Orleans Saints (1984–1988); New England Patriots (1990); Cleveland Browns (1991–1993); New York Jets (1994–1998); Washington Redskins (1999)	107
15	Dustin Colquitt	Kansas City Chiefs (2005–2019); Pittsburgh Steelers (2020); Jacksonville Jaguars (2020); Atlanta Falcons (2021); Cleveland Browns (2021)	103
16	Chris Gardocki	Chicago Bears (1991–1994); Indianapolis Colts (1995–1998); Cleveland Browns (1999–2003); Pittsburgh Steelers (2004–2006)	103
17	Mark Royals	Philadelphia Eagles (1987); St. Louis Cardinals (1987); Tampa Bay Buccaneers (1990–1991, 1999–2001); Pittsburgh Steelers (1992–1994); Detroit Lions (1995–1996); New Orleans Saints (1997–1998); Miami Dolphins (2002–2003); Jacksonville Jaguars (2003)	103
18	Jeff Gossett	Kansas City Chiefs (1981–1982); Cleveland Browns (1983, 1985–1987); Houston Oilers (1987); Los Angeles Raiders / Oakland (1988, 1996	101
19	Brad Maynard	New York Giants (1997–2000); Chicago Bears (2001–2010); Cleveland Browns (2011)	100
20	Tom Tupa	Phoenix Cardinals (1988–1991); Indianapolis Colts (1992); Cleveland Browns (1993–1995); New England Patriots (1996–1998); New York Jets (1999–2001); Tampa Bay Buccaneers (2002–2003); Washington Redskins (2004–2005)	100
Statistics accurate through the 2026 NFL season and gathered from The Football Database.

== See also ==
- List of NFL annual punting yards leaders
- List of NFL career punting yards leaders
