= Rohn =

Rohn may refer to:

== People ==
=== Given name ===
- Rohn Thomas, American actor
- Rohn Stark (b. 1959), American football player

=== Surname ===
- Dan Rohn (b. 1957), baseball player
- Emileigh Rohn, American musician
- Jennifer Rohn (b. 1967), scientist and novelist
- Jim Rohn (1930-2009), American entrepreneur
- Karl Rohn (1855-1920), German mathematician
- Max Rohn (born 1987), American para-athlete
- Thorleiv Røhn (1881-1963), Norwegian military officer and gymnast

== Other ==
- Rohn Industries, Inc., manufacturer of telecommunications infrastructure
- Rhön Mountains in Germany

== See also ==
- Rhon (disambiguation)
- Rhone (disambiguation)
  - Rhône, a major river in France
