= List of Jacksonville Jaguars award winners and honorees =

This page is a list of Jacksonville Jaguars players who have received major NFL awards and honors, including league-wide awards, All-Pro selections and Pro Bowl appearances. The team’s first Pro Bowl participants appeared in the 1997 Pro Bowl (following the 1996 NFL season), and the first Jaguars players named All-Pro were honored in 1997.

== NFL Honors ==
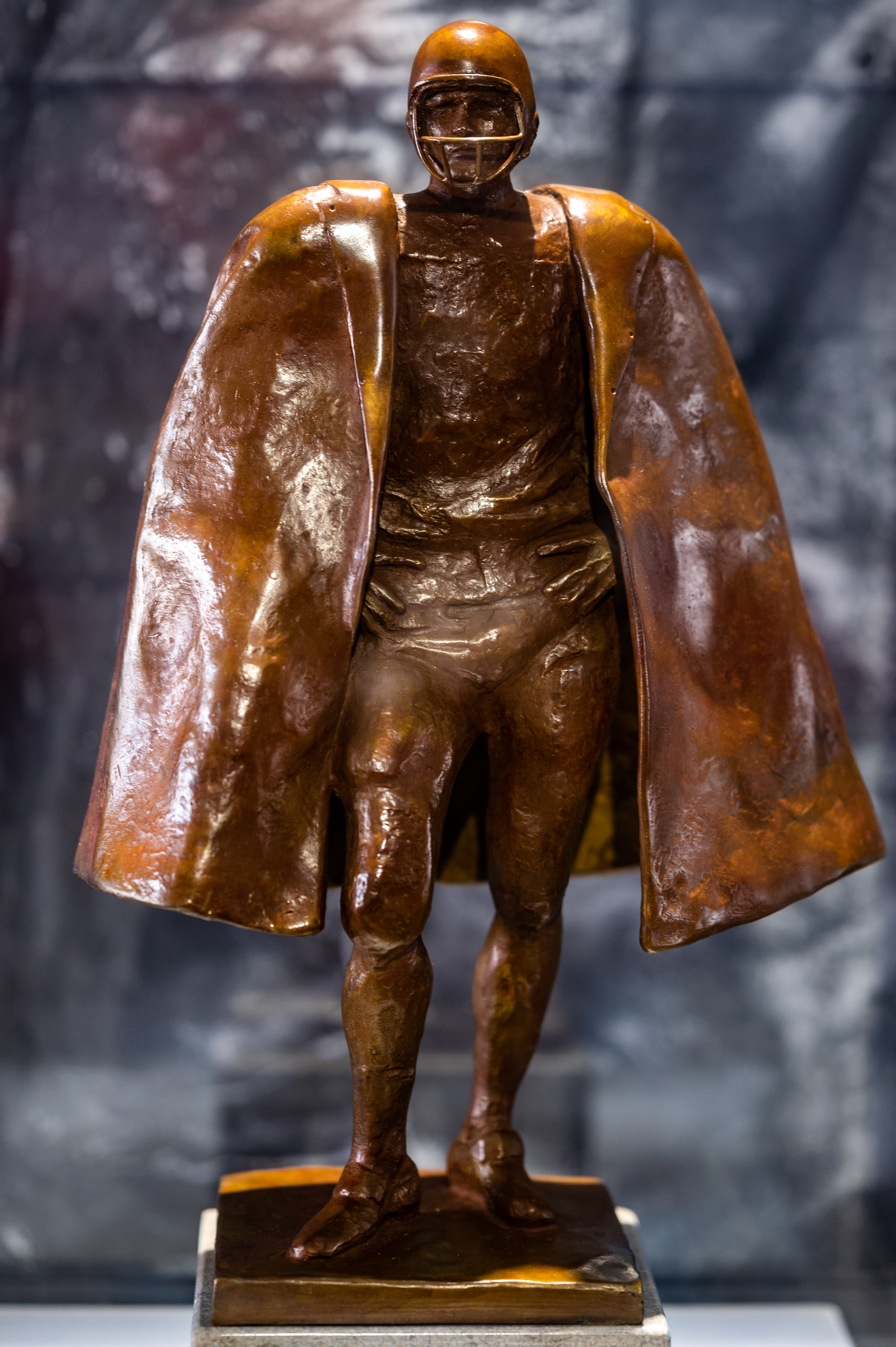
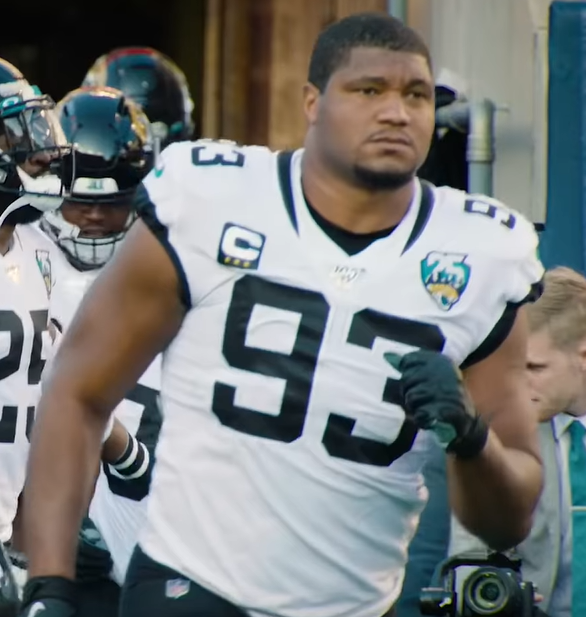
Left: Walter Payton NFL Man of the Year Award;
Right: Calais Campbell, (2019)

=== Walter Payton NFL Man of the Year ===
Each year, a winner is selected from 32 nominees from the 32 different teams. A panel of judges, which includes the Commissioner of the NFL, the previous year's winner, and a number of former players select the winner of the award. The Man of the Year winner receives a $250,000 donation in his name to a charity of his choice.

Walter Payton NFL Man of the Year
Players
Player	Position	Year(s)	Ref.
Calais Campbell	DE	2019	
Arik Armstead	DT	2024	

== All-Pro ==
The All-Pro selections are chosen by three outlets: the Associated Press (AP), the Pro Football Writers of America (PFWA), and The Sporting News (TSN), respectively.

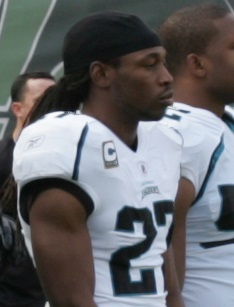
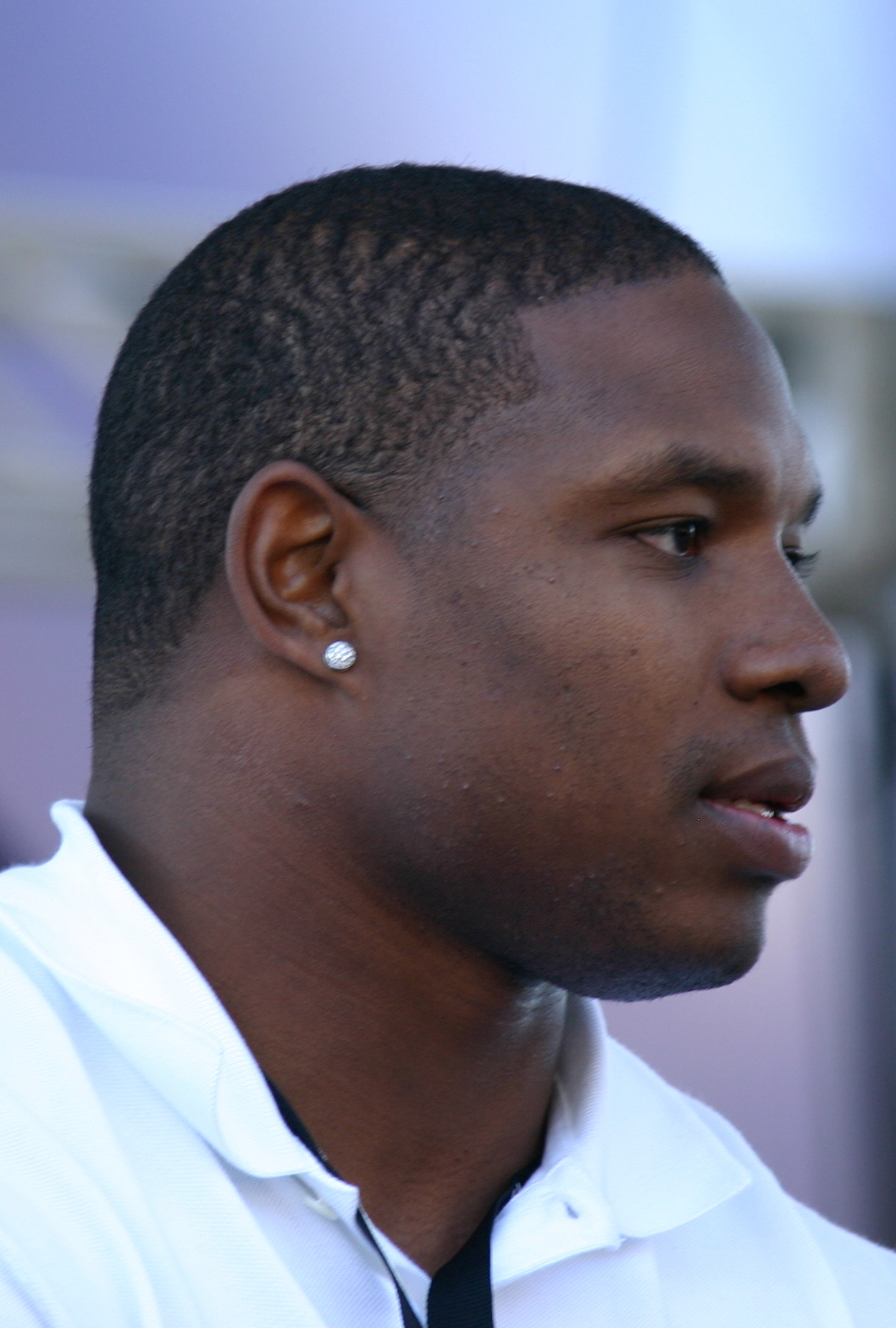
Left: Rashean Mathis (First-Team All-Pro, 2006);
Right: Maurice Jones-Drew (First-Team All-Pro, 2011)

As of 2022, the NFL Players Association (NFLPA) also selects its own All-Pro team.

=== First-Team All-Pros ===
First-Team All-Pros
Players
Player	Position	Year(s)	Selector(s)	Ref.
Tony Boselli	OT	1997–1999	AP, PFWA, & TSN	
Bryan Barker	P	1997	AP & PFWA	
Kevin Hardy	OLB	1999	AP, PFWA, & TSN	
Carnell Lake	S	1999	PFWA	
Marcus Stroud	DT	2004–2005	PFWA ('04) & TSN ('05)	
Rashean Mathis	CB	2006	AP, PFWA, & TSN	
Maurice; Jones-Drew	RB	2010–2011	TSN ('10) & AP, PFWA, and TSN ('11)	
Calais Campbell	DE	2017	AP & PFWA	
Jalen Ramsey	CB	2017	AP, PFWA, & TSN	
Ross Matiscik	LS	2023–2025	NFLPA, AP	
Logan Cooke	P	2024	NFLPA	

=== Second-Team All-Pros ===
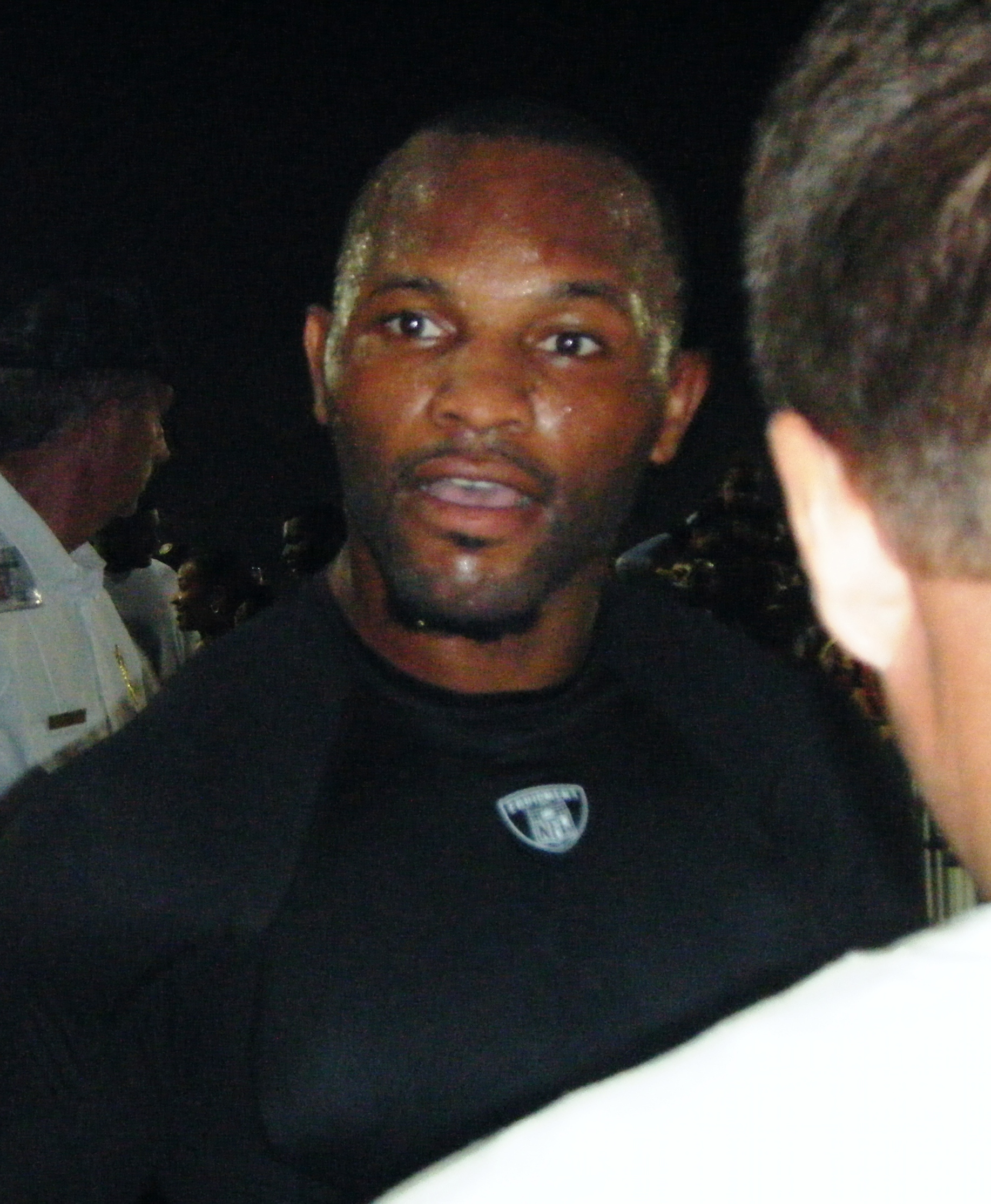
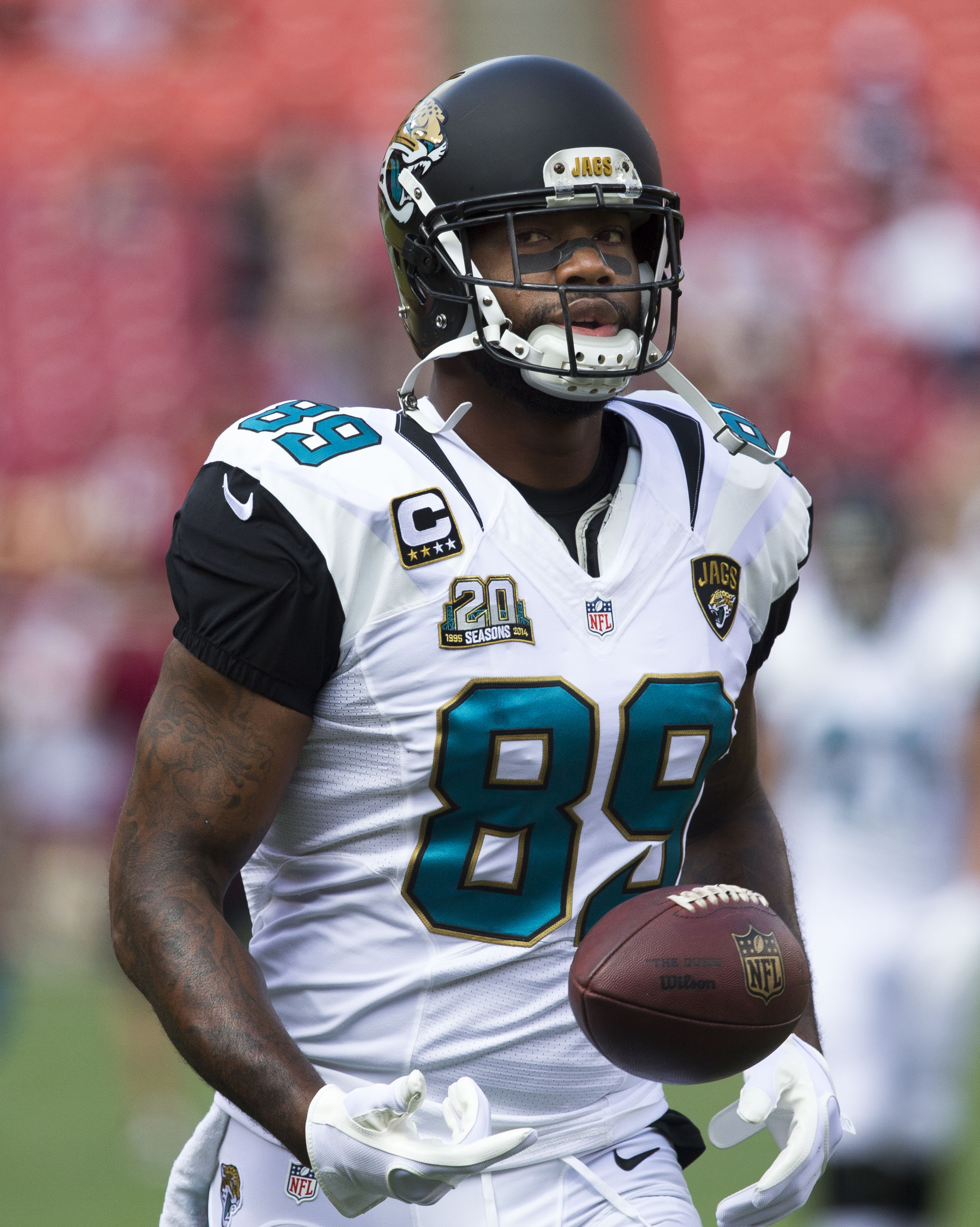
Left: Fred Taylor (Second-Team All-Pro, 2007);
Right: Marcedes Lewis (Second-Team All-Pro, 2010)

Second-Team All-Pros
Players
Player	Position	Year(s)	Selector(s)	Ref.
Jimmy Smith	WR	1998–1999	AP	
Tony Brackens	DE	1999	AP	
Carnell Lake	S	1999	AP	
Leon Searcy	OT	1999	AP	
Chris Hanson	P	2002	AP	
Marcus Stroud	DT	2003	AP	
Mike Peterson	ILB	2005	AP	
John Henderson	DT	2006	AP	
Fred Taylor	RB	2007	AP	
Maurice Jones-Drew	RB	2009	TSN	
Marcedes Lewis	TE	2010	AP	
A. J. Bouye	CB	2017	AP	
Calais Campbell	DT	2017	AP	
Telvin Smith	LB	2017	AP	
Josh Lambo	K	2019	AP	
Logan Cooke	P	2024	AP	
Ross Matiscik	LS	2024	AP	
Devin Lloyd	LB	2025	AP	

== Pro Bowlers ==
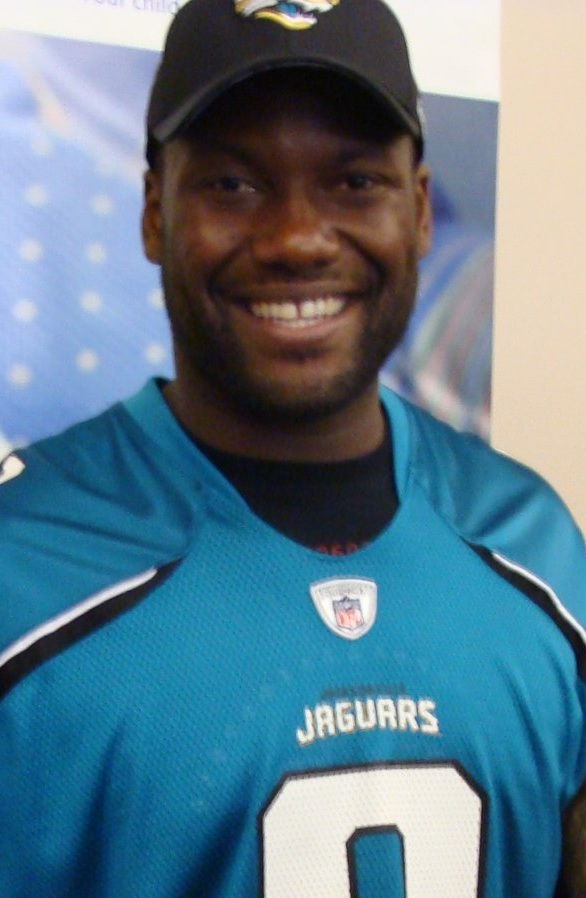
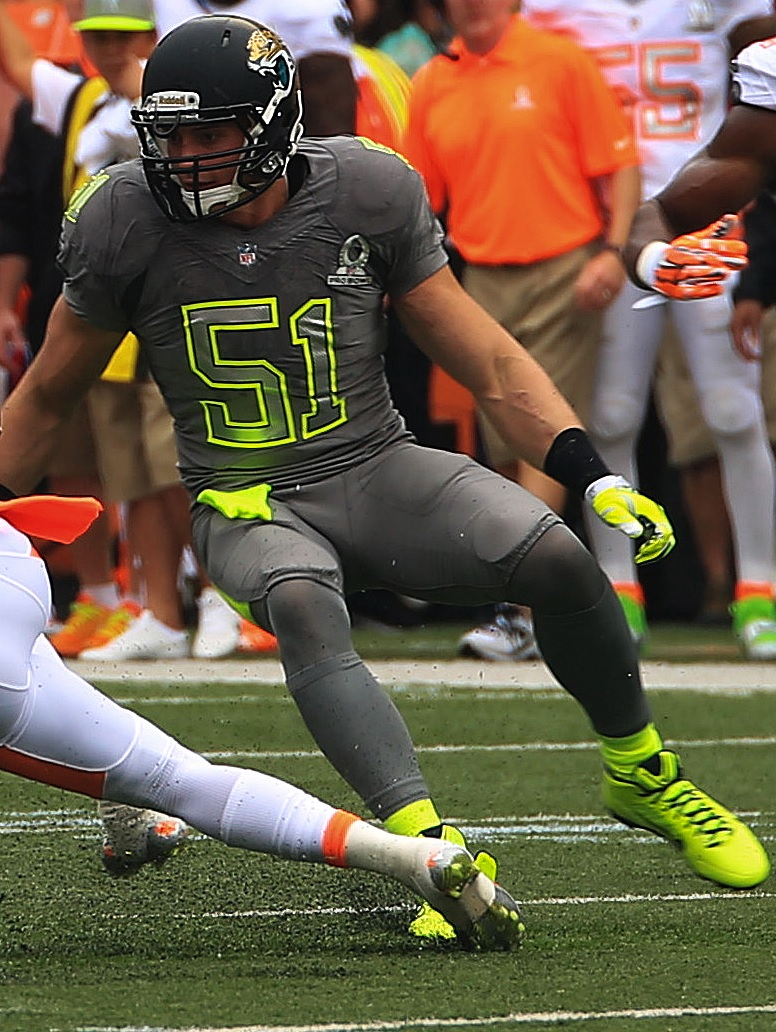
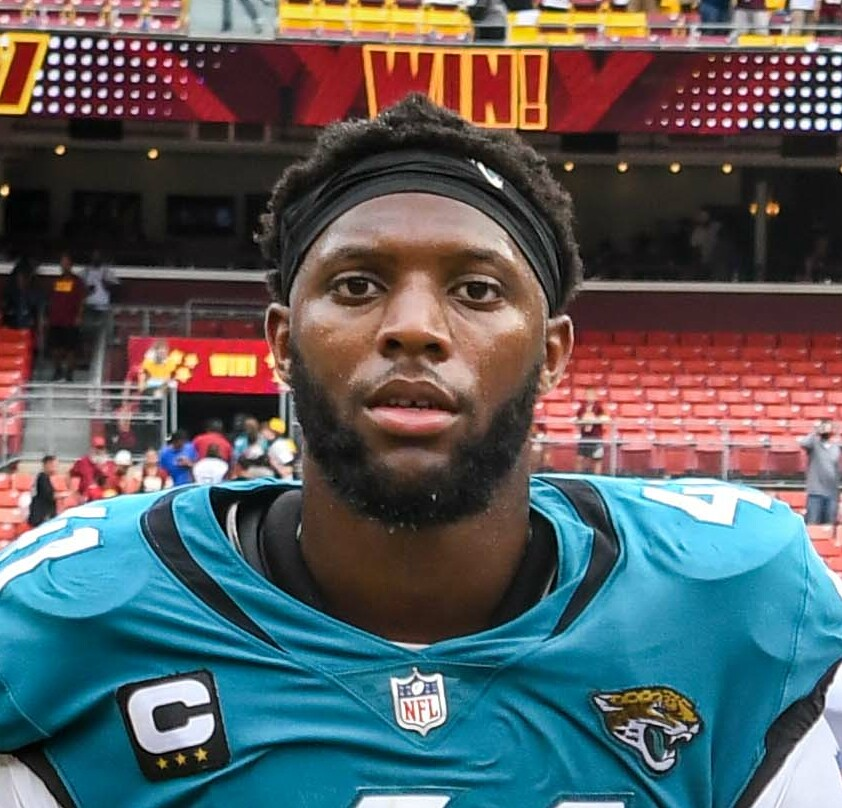
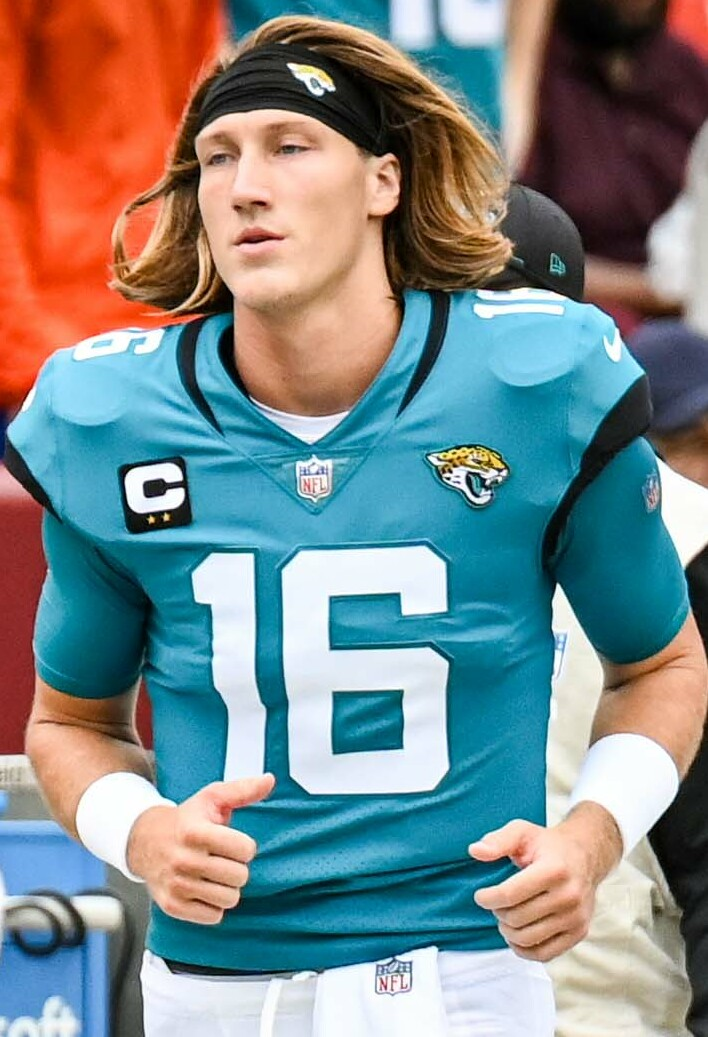
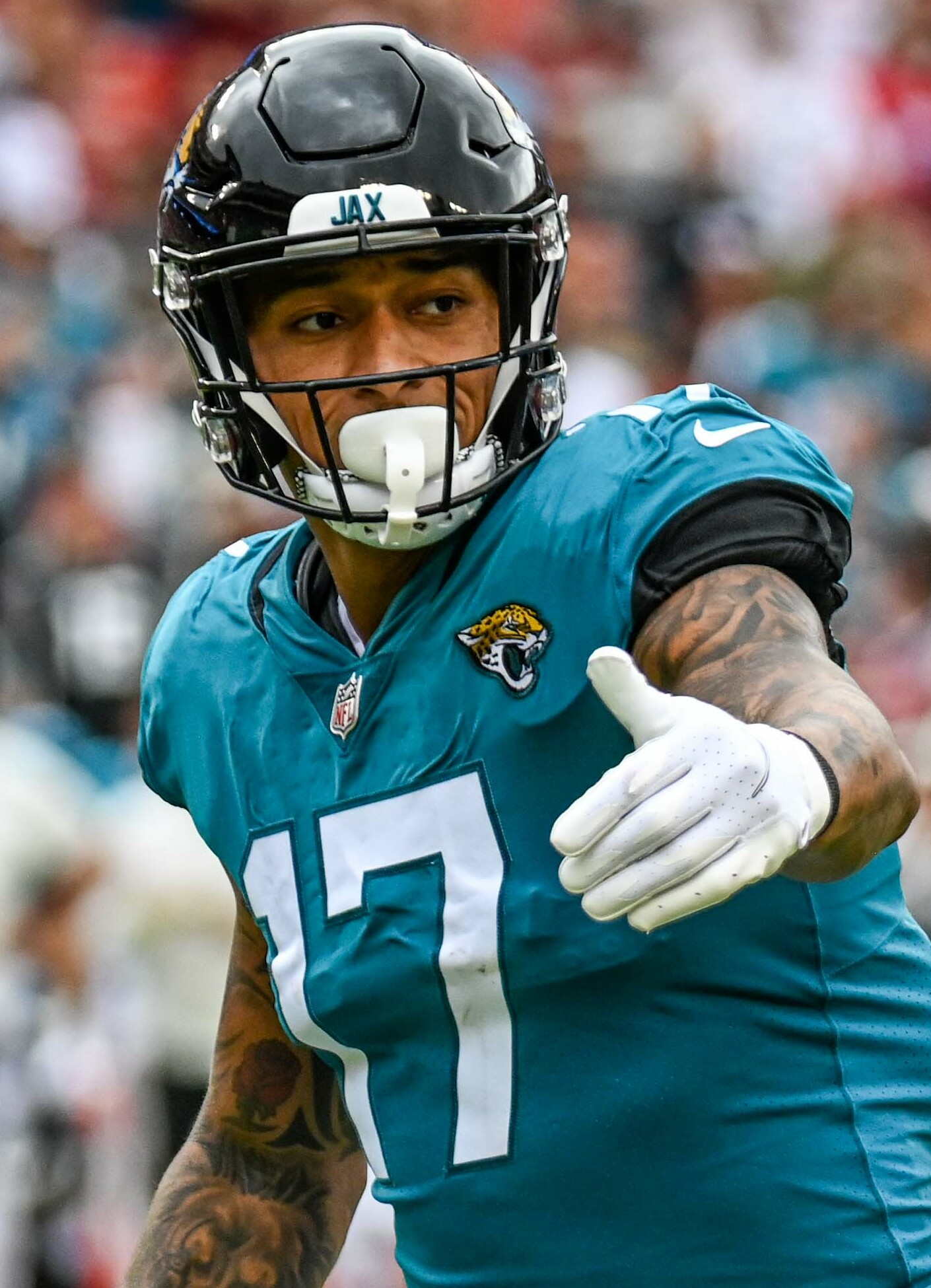
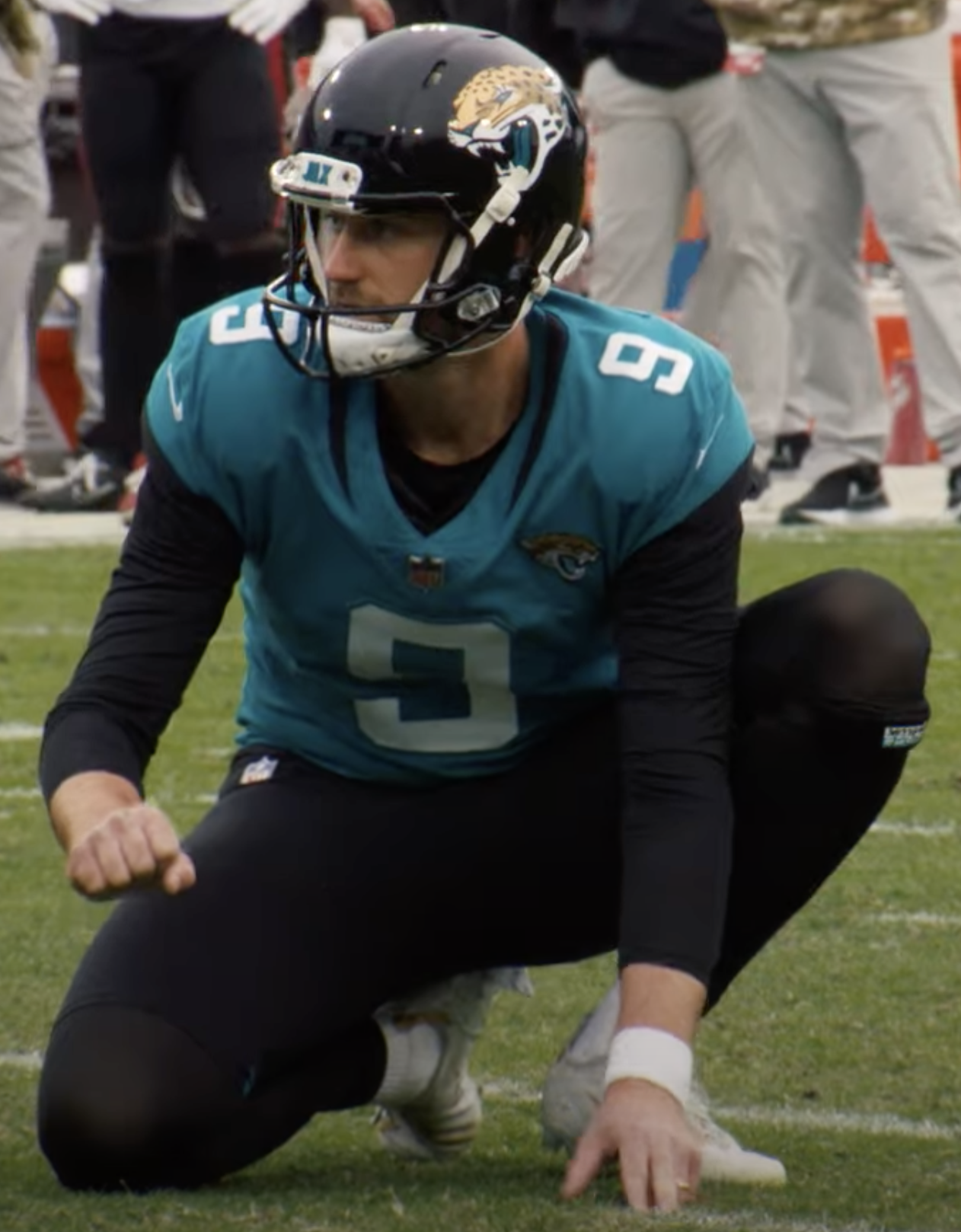
From top, left to right: David Garrard (2009); Paul Posluszny (2013); Josh Allen (2019 & 2023); Trevor Lawrence (2022); Evan Engram (2023); Logan Cooke (2024)

= Named Pro Bowl MVP or Defensive MVP

Pro Bowlers
Players
Player	Position	Pro Bowls	Year(s)	Ref.
Tony Boselli	OT	5	1996–2000	
Mark Brunell	QB	3	1996–1997, 1999	
Keenan McCardell	WR	1	1996	
Bryan Barker	P	1	1997	
Mike Hollis	K	1	1997	
Jimmy Smith	WR	5	1997–2001	
Tony Brackens	DE	1	1999	
Kevin Hardy	MLB	1	1999	
Carnell Lake	FS	1	1999	
Leon Searcy	OT	1	1999	
Gary Walker	DT	1	2001	
Chris Hanson	P	1	2002	
Marcus Stroud	DT	3	2003–2005	
John Henderson	DT	2	2004, 2006	
Rashean Mathis	CB	1	2006	
Fred Taylor	RB	1	2007	
David Garrard	QB	1	2009	
Maurice Jones-Drew	RB	3	2009–2011	
Marcedes Lewis	TE	1	2010	
Montell Owens	RB/ST	2	2010–2011	
Paul Posluszny	MLB	1	2013	
Allen Robinson	WR	1	2015	
A. J. Bouye	CB	1	2017	
Calais Campbell	DE	3	2017–2019	
Malik Jackson	DT	1	2017	
Yannick Ngakoue	DE	1	2017	
Jalen Ramsey	CB	3	2017–2019	
Telvin Smith	OLB	1	2017	
Josh Allen	OLB	2	2019, 2023	
D. J. Chark	WR	1	2019	
Jamal Agnew	WR/RS	1	2022	
Trevor Lawrence	QB	1	2022	
Evan Engram	TE	1	2023	
Ross Matiscik	LS	3	2023–2025	
Logan Cooke	P	1	2024	
Brian Thomas Jr.	WR	1	2024	
Devin Lloyd	LB	1	2025	
