= List of NFL career punting yards leaders =

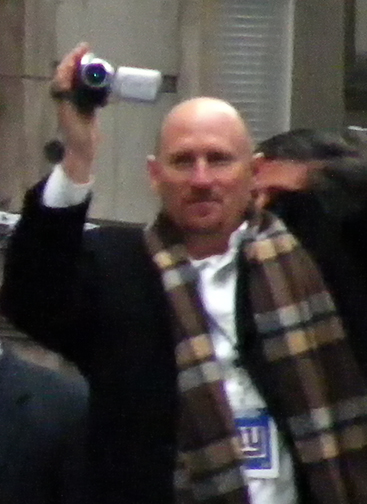
Jeff Feagles holds the NFL career record for most punting yards with 71,211.

In American football, a punt is a kick that is performed after a player (most often a punter) drops the ball from their hands and kicks it prior to it hitting the ground. Record keeping for punting yards in the National Football League (NFL) goes as far back as 1939.

To be eligible for career-long rankings, a player must have a minimum of 250 punts. Although he never led the league in punting yards for a single-season, Jeff Feagles' longevity propelled him to become the career punting yards leader, with 71,211. Feagles is the only punter to eclipse 70,000 career punting yards, and only three other punters have surpassed the 60,000 mark. He also set the career record for total punts in 2005, when he recorded his 1,368th, surpassing Sean Landeta. He later retired with 1,713 career punts, still the NFL record.

With 1,168 punts and 52,868 punting yards for the Baltimore Ravens, Sam Koch has the most of both statistics for any individual franchise. Ranked 7th all-time in career punting yards, Koch is also the highest-ranked punter to have spent his entire career with a single team. The Kansas City Chiefs are the only other franchise to have a player punt for over 50,000 yards during their tenure with the team.

A. J. Cole III holds the NFL's all-time yards per punt record (48.7).

Net yards per punt, or net average, as opposed to a player's gross average, is considered a more revealing indicator of a punter's performance. This is due to the net average taking into account return yardage or a touchback on the punt which are subtracted from the gross punting yards, or how far the ball travels on a punt. Logan Cooke holds the record for career net average (43.3), although Tommy Davis holds the unofficial record (44.5), having played prior to 1976, when the statistic began being officially tracked.

== Career punting yards leaders ==
Key
^	Inducted into the Pro Football Hall of Fame
*	Denotes player who is still active

Based on at least 40,000 punting yards.

Rank	Player	Team(s) by season	Punts	Yards	Average
1	Jeff Feagles	New England Patriots (1988–1989); Philadelphia Eagles (1990–1993); Arizona Cardinals (1994–1997); Seattle Seahawks (1998–2002); New York Giants (2003–2009)	1,713	71,211	41.6
2	Shane Lechler	Oakland Raiders (2000–2012); Houston Texans (2013–2017)	1,444	68,676	47.6
3	Andy Lee	San Francisco 49ers (2004–2014); Cleveland Browns (2015); Carolina Panthers (2016); Arizona Cardinals (2017–2022)	1,466	68,405	46.7
4	Sean Landeta	New York Giants (1985–1993); Los Angeles / St. Louis Rams (1993–1996, 2003–2004); Tampa Bay Buccaneers (1997); Green Bay Packers (1998); Philadelphia Eagles (1999–2002, 2005)	1,401	60,707	43.3
5	Brad Maynard	New York Giants (1997–2000); Chicago Bears (2001–2010); Cleveland Browns (2011)	1,339	56,021	41.8
6	Dustin Colquitt	Kansas City Chiefs (2005–2019); Pittsburgh Steelers (2020); Jacksonville Jaguars (2020); Atlanta Falcons (2021); Cleveland Browns (2021)	1,198	53,660	44.8
7	Sam Koch	Baltimore Ravens (2006–2021)	1,168	52,868	45.3
8	Donnie Jones	Seattle Seahawks (2004); Miami Dolphins (2005–2006); St. Louis Rams (2007–2011); Houston Texans (2012); Philadelphia Eagles (2013–2017); Los Angeles Chargers (2018)	1,157	52,490	45.4
9	Lee Johnson	Houston Oilers (1985–1987); Cleveland Browns (1987–1988); Cincinnati Bengals (1988–1998); New England Patriots (1999–2001); Minnesota Vikings (2001); Philadelphia Eagles (2002)	1,226	51,979	42.4
10	Chris Gardocki	Chicago Bears (1991–1994); Indianapolis Colts (1995–1998); Cleveland Browns (1999–2003); Pittsburgh Steelers (2004–2006)	1,177	50,336	42.8
11	Rohn Stark	Baltimore Colts (1982–1983); Indianapolis Colts (1984–1994); Pittsburgh Steelers (1995); Carolina Panthers (1996); Seattle Seahawks (1997)	1,141	49,471	43.4
12	Craig Hentrich	Green Bay Packers (1994–1997); Tennessee Oilers / Titans (1999–2009)	1,150	49,281	42.9
13	Johnny Hekker	St. Louis / Los Angeles Rams (2012–2021); Carolina Panthers (2022–2024); Tennessee Titans (2025); Minnesota Vikings (2026)	1,053	49,228	46.8
14	Matt Turk	Washington Redskins (1995–1999); Miami Dolphins (2000–2001, 2003–2005); New York Jets (2002); St. Louis Rams (2006); Houston Texans (2007–2011); Jacksonville Jaguars (2011)	1,143	48,414	42.4
15	Bryan Barker	Kansas City Chiefs (1990–1993); Philadelphia Eagles (1994); Jacksonville Jaguars (1995–2000); Washington Redskins (2001–2003); Green Bay Packers (2004); St. Louis Rams (2005)	1,132	47,641	42.1
16	Dave Jennings	New York Giants (1974–1984); New York Jets (1985–1987)	1,154	47,567	41.2
17	Thomas Morstead*	New Orleans Saints (2009–2020); New York Jets (2021, 2023–2024); Miami Dolphins (2022); San Francisco 49ers (2025); Tennessee Titans (2026–present)	1,009	47,089	46.7
18	Mark Royals	Philadelphia Eagles (1987); St. Louis Cardinals (1987); Tampa Bay Buccaneers (1990–1991, 1999–2001); Pittsburgh Steelers (1992–1994); Detroit Lions (1995–1996); New Orleans Saints (1997–1998); Miami Dolphins (2002–2003); Jacksonville Jaguars (2003)	1,116	47,021	42.1
19	Chris Mohr	Tampa Bay Buccaneers (1989); Buffalo Bills (1991–2000); Atlanta Falcons (2001–2004)	1,152	46,570	40.4
20	Jerrel Wilson	Kansas City Chiefs (1963–1977); New England Patriots (1978)	1,072	46,139	43.0
21	Brett Kern	Denver Broncos (2008–2009); Tennessee Titans (2009–2021); Philadelphia Eagles (2022)	1,006	46,136	45.9
22	Kevin Huber	Cincinnati Bengals (2009–2022)	1,011	45,766	45.3
23	Bryan Anger*	Jacksonville Jaguars (2012–2015); Tampa Bay Buccaneers (2016–2018); Houston Texans (2019–2020); Dallas Cowboys (2021–present)	957	45,001	47.0
24	Brian Hansen	New Orleans Saints (1984–1988); New England Patriots (1990); Cleveland Browns (1991–1993); New York Jets (1994–1998); Washington Redskins (1999)	1,057	44,700	42.3
25	Ray Guy^	Oakland / Los Angeles Raiders (1973–1986)	1,049	44,493	42.4
26	John James	Atlanta Falcons (1972–1981); Detroit Lions (1982); Houston Oilers (1982–1984)	1,083	43,992	40.6
27	Rich Camarillo	New England Patriots (1981–1987); Los Angeles Rams (1988); Phoenix Cardinals (1989–1993); Houston Oilers (1994–1995); Oakland Raiders (1996)	1,027	43,895	42.7
28	Reggie Roby	Miami Dolphins (1983–1992); Washington Redskins (1993–1994); Tampa Bay Buccaneers (1995); Houston Oilers (1996); Tennessee Oilers (1997); San Francisco 49ers (1998)	992	42,951	43.3
29	Brian Moorman	Buffalo Bills (2001–2012, 2013); Dallas Cowboys (2012)	979	42,867	43.8
30	Mike Horan	Philadelphia Eagles (1984–1985); Denver Broncos (1986–1992); New York Giants (1993–1996); St. Louis Rams (1997, 1999); Chicago Bears (1998)	1,003	42,286	42.2
31	Dan Stryzinski	Pittsburgh Steelers (1990–1991); Tampa Bay Buccaneers (1992–1994); Atlanta Falcons (1995–2000); Kansas City Chiefs (2001–2002); New York Jets (2003)	1,055	42,072	39.9
32	Bobby Joe Green	Pittsburgh Steelers (1960–1961); Chicago Bears (1962–1973)	970	41,317	42.6
33	Tress Way*	Washington Redskins / Football Team / Commanders (2014–present)	872	40,980	47.0
34	Jon Ryan	Green Bay Packers (2006–2007); Seattle Seahawks (2008–2017)	914	40,883	44.7
35	Jeff Gossett	Kansas City Chiefs (1981–1982); Cleveland Browns (1983, 1985–1987); Houston Oilers (1987); Los Angeles Raiders / Oakland (1988–1996)	982	40,569	41.3
36	Bobby Walden	Minnesota Vikings (1964–1967); Pittsburgh Steelers (1968–1977)	974	40,529	41.6

== Career punting average leaders ==
Key
*	Denotes player who is still active
†	Denotes player's statistics are unofficial (Note: Prior to 1976, the NFL did not track net punting yards, and still does not officially recognize them, rendering pre-1976 net punting stats unofficial.)

Yards per punt

Yards per punt
Rank	Player	Team(s) by season	Y/P
1	A. J. Cole III*	Oakland / Las Vegas Raiders (2019–present)	48.7
2	Jack Fox*	Detroit Lions (2020–present)	48.4
3	Michael Dickson*	Seattle Seahawks (2018–present)	48.1
4	Jordan Stout	Baltimore Ravens (2022–2025); New York Giants (2026–present)	48.0
5	Blake Gillikin*	New Orleans Saints (2020–2022); Arizona Cardinals (2023–present)	47.9
6	Tommy Townsend*	Kansas City Chiefs (2020–2023); Houston Texans (2024–2025); Tennessee Titans (2026–present)	47.8
7	Ryan Wright*	Minnesota Vikings (2022–2025); New Orleans Saints (2026–present)	47.7
8	Shane Lechler	Oakland Raiders (2000–2012); Houston Texans (2013–2017)	47.6
9	Logan Cooke*	Jacksonville Jaguars (2018–present)	47.5
10	Braden Mann*	New York Jets (2020–2022); Philadelphia Eagles (2023–present)	47.3
Statistics accurate through the 2026 NFL season and gathered from Pro-Football-Reference.

Net yards per punt

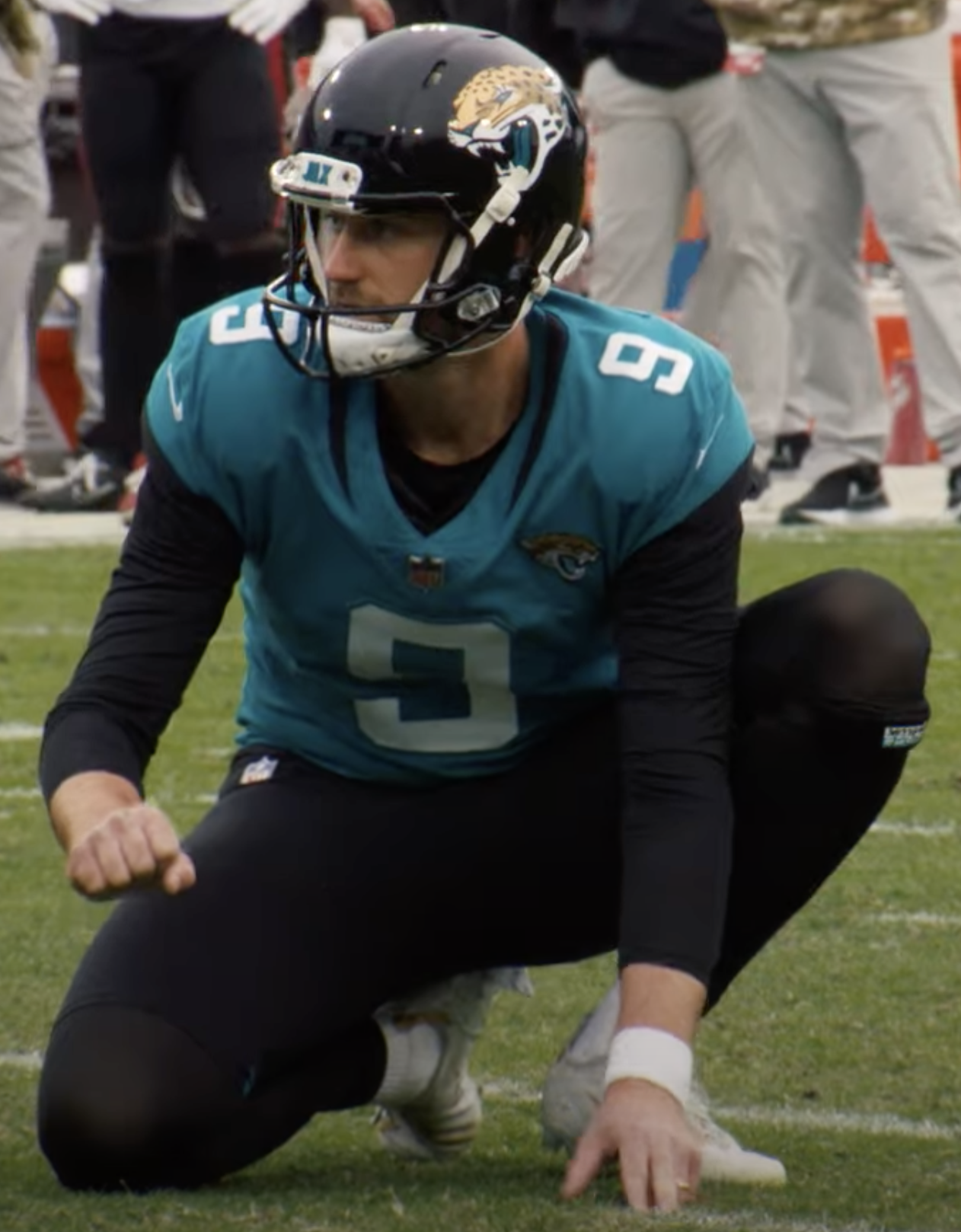
Logan Cooke holds the NFL's career record for net yards per punt among players with officially tracked statistics.

Net yards per punt
Rank	Player	Team(s) by season	Net
1	Tommy Davis†	San Francisco 49ers (1959–1969)	44.5
2	Yale Lary†	Detroit Lions (1952–1953, 1956–1964)	43.9
2	Sammy Baugh†	Washington Redskins (1937–1952)	43.9
4	Dave Lewis†	Cincinnati Bengals (1970–1973)	43.7
5	Jerry Norton†	Philadelphia Eagles (1954–1958); Chicago/St. Louis Cardinals (1959–1961); Dallas Cowboys (1962); Green Bay Packers (1963–1964)	43.5
6	Logan Cooke*	Jacksonville Jaguars (2018–present)	43.5
6	Horace Gillom†	Cleveland Browns (1947–1956)	43.3
8	Bob Scarpitto†	San Diego Chargers (1961); Denver Broncos (1962–1967); Boston Patriots (1968)	43.2
8	Don Chandler†	New York Giants (1956–1964); Green Bay Packers (1965–1967)	43.2
10	Jack Fox*	Detroit Lions (2020–present)	42.9
Statistics accurate through the 2026 NFL season and gathered from The Football Database.

== Career franchise punting yards leaders ==
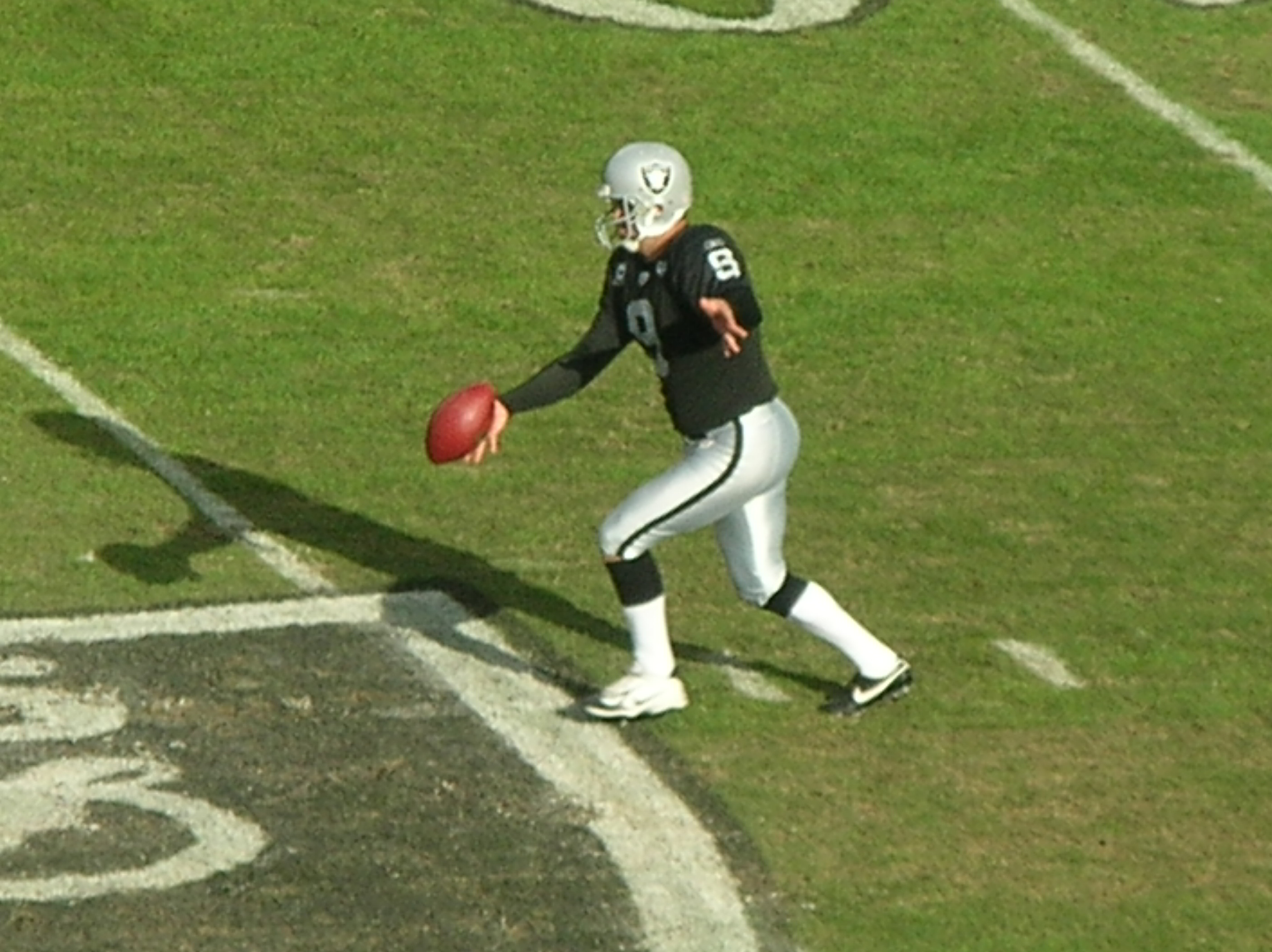
Shane Lechler holds the franchise record for punting yards for both the Las Vegas Raiders and Houston Texans.

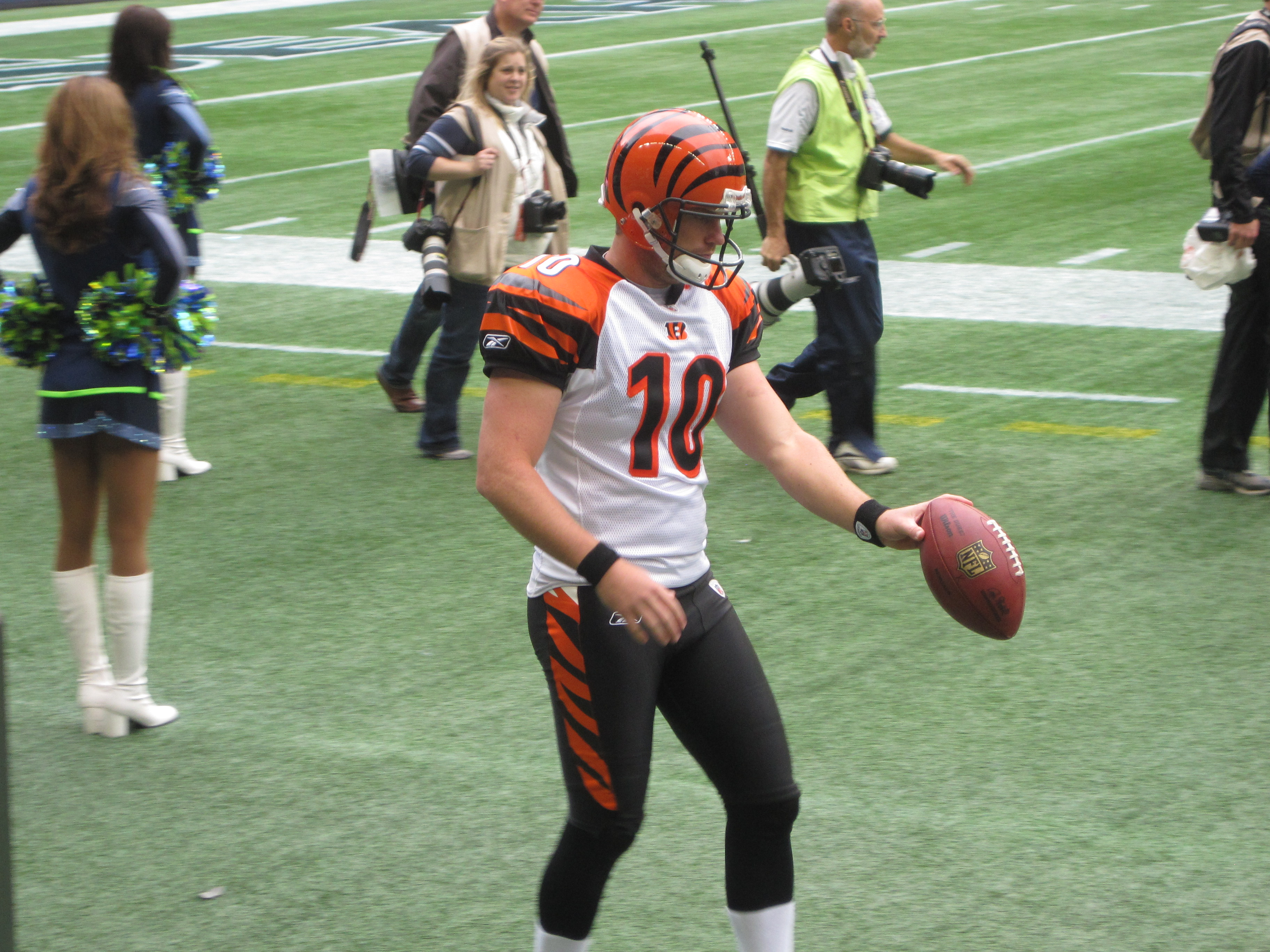
Kevin Huber holds the Bengals franchise record for career punting yards.

Key
*	Denotes player who is still active
‡	Franchise with punting leader on its current roster

Team	Player	Tenure	Punts	Yards	Average	Ref.
Arizona Cardinals	Scott Player	1998–2007	714	30,752	43.1	
Atlanta Falcons	John James	1972–1981	873	35,633	40.8	
Baltimore Ravens	Sam Koch	2006–2021	1,168	52,868	45.3	
Buffalo Bills	Brian Moorman	2001–2012, 2013	923	40,370	43.7	
Carolina Panthers	Jason Baker	2005–2012	570	25,064	44.0	
Chicago Bears	Brad Maynard	2001–2010	878	36,781	41.9	
Cincinnati Bengals	Kevin Huber	2009–2022	1,011	45,766	45.3	
Cleveland Browns	Don Cockroft	1968–1980	651	26,262	40.3	
Dallas Cowboys	Mike Saxon	1985–1992	591	24,542	41.5	
Denver Broncos	Tom Rouen	1993–2002	641	28,146	43.9	
Detroit Lions	Nick Harris	2003–2012	694	29,857	43.0	
Green Bay Packers	David Beverly	1975–1980	495	18,785	37.9	
Houston Texans	Shane Lechler	2013–2017	430	20,463	47.6	
Indianapolis Colts	Rohn Stark	1982–1994	985	43,162	43.8	
Jacksonville Jaguars	Logan Cooke‡	2018–present	557	26,471	47.5	
Kansas City Chiefs	Dustin Colquitt	2005–2019	1,124	50,393	44.8	
Las Vegas Raiders	Shane Lechler	2000–2012	1,014	48,215	47.5	
Los Angeles Chargers	Mike Scifres	2003–2016	756	34,152	45.2	
Los Angeles Rams	Johnny Hekker	2012–2021	727	33,951	46.7	
Miami Dolphins	Brandon Fields	2007–2014	594	27,780	46.8	
Minnesota Vikings	Greg Coleman	1978–1987	720	29,391	40.8	
New England Patriots	Rich Camarillo	1981–1987	468	19,922	42.6	
New Orleans Saints	Thomas Morstead*	2009–2020	692	32,190	46.5	
New York Giants	Dave Jennings	1974–1984	931	38,792	41.7	
New York Jets	Curley Johnson	1961–1968	534	22,718	42.5	
Philadelphia Eagles	Donnie Jones	2013–2017	374	16,971	45.4	
Pittsburgh Steelers	Bobby Walden	1968–1977	716	29,462	41.1	
San Francisco 49ers	Andy Lee	2004–2015	941	43,468	46.2	
Seattle Seahawks	Jon Ryan	2008–2018	770	34,492	44.8	
Tampa Bay Buccaneers	Josh Bidwell	2004–2009	419	18,426	44.0	
Tennessee Titans	Brett Kern	2009–2021	923	42,333	45.9	
Washington Commanders	Tress Way‡	2014–present	872	40,980	47.0	
Statistics accurate through the 2026 NFL season.

== See also ==
- List of NFL annual punting yards leaders
- List of NFL career punts leaders
