= Rohne =

Rohne may refer to:

- Rohne (Helme), a river of Saxony-Anhalt, Germany, tributary of the Helme
- Rohne, Schleife, a district of the municipality Schleife in Saxony, Germany

== People with that surname ==
- Marius Røhne (1883–1966), Norwegian landscape architect
- Nils A. Røhne (born 1949), Norwegian politician for the Labour Party

== See also ==
Rhone (disambiguation)
