= NFL punting yards leaders =

NFL punting yards leaders may refer to:

- List of NFL annual punting yards leaders
- List of NFL career punting yards leaders
