= Logan Cooke =

American football player (born 1995)

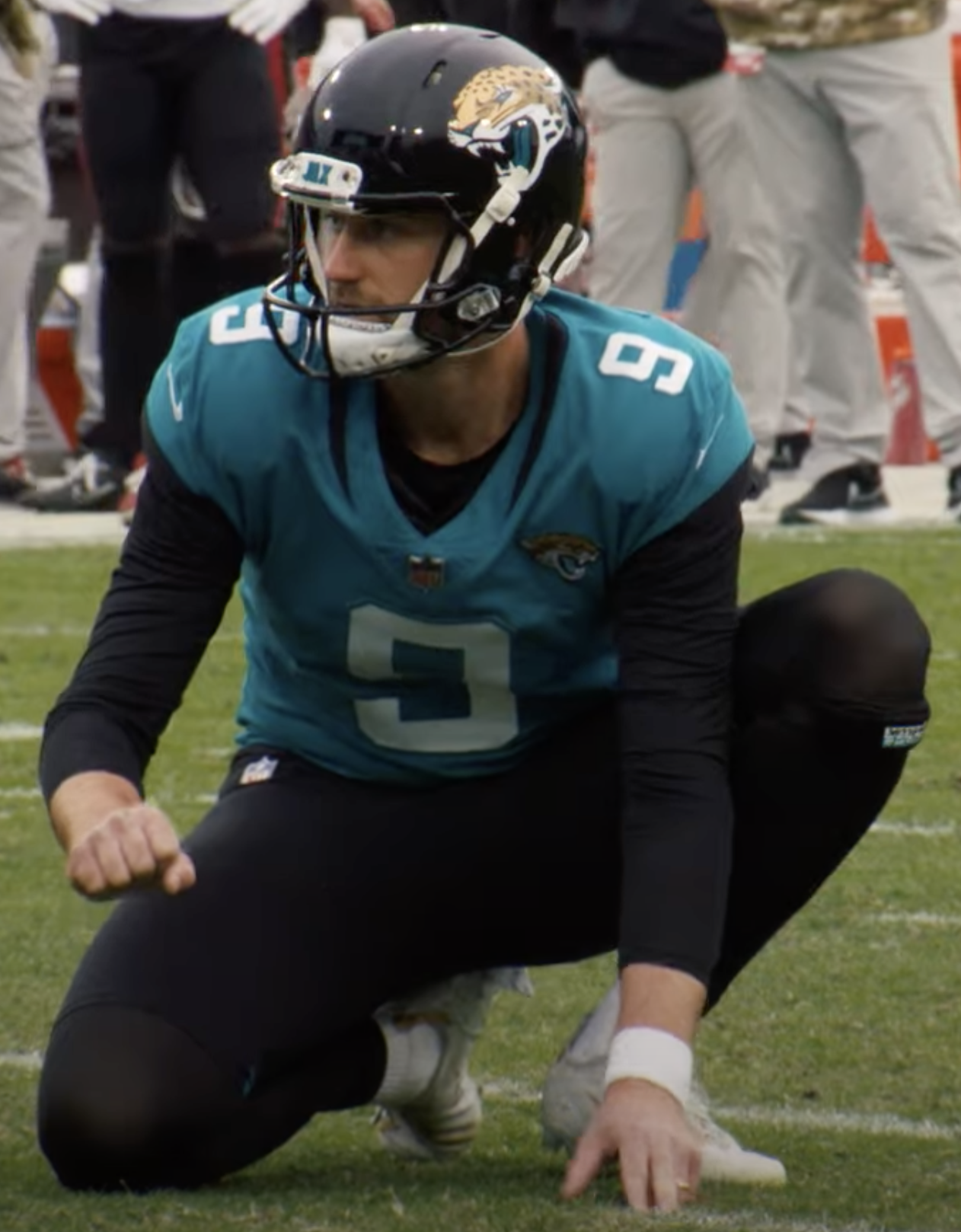
- Cooke with the Jacksonville Jaguars in 2021

No. 9 – Jacksonville Jaguars
- Position: Punter
- Roster status: Active

Personal information
- Born: July 28, 1995 (age 31); Columbia, Mississippi, U.S.
- Listed height: 6 ft 5 in (1.96 m)
- Listed weight: 230 lb (104 kg)

Career information
- High school: Columbia Academy
- College: Mississippi State (2014–2017)
- NFL draft: 2018: 7th round, 247th overall pick

Career history
- Jacksonville Jaguars (2018–present)

Awards and highlights
- Second-team All-Pro (2024); Pro Bowl (2024)

Career NFL statistics as of Week 10, 2026
- Punts: 557
- Punt yards: 26,471
- Punt average: 47.5
- Inside 20: 230
- Stats at Pro Football Reference

Logan Edward Cooke (born July 28, 1995) is an American professional football punter for the Jacksonville Jaguars of the National Football League (NFL). He played college football for the Mississippi State Bulldogs.

== Early life ==
Cooke attended and played high school football at Columbia Academy. He received offers from Southern Miss and Mississippi State before ultimately choosing to attend Mississippi State.

== College career ==
Cooke played for Mississippi State from 2014 to 2017. He recorded 150 punts for 6,250 net yards for a 41.7 average.

== Professional career ==
Pre-draft measurables
Height	Weight	Arm length	Hand span	Wingspan
6 ft 5 3/8 in (1.97 m)	237 lb (108 kg)	33 in (0.84 m)	8 1/2 in (0.22 m)	6 ft 6 1/8 in (1.98 m)
All values from Pro Day

Cooke was selected by the Jacksonville Jaguars in the seventh round (247th overall) in the 2018 NFL draft. He made his NFL debut in the Jaguars' season opener against the New York Giants. In the 20–15 victory, he had seven punts for 264 net yards. Overall, he finished his rookie season with 86 punts for 3,872 net yards for a 45.02 average.

In the 2019 season, Cooke punted 75 times with a 46.76 average. Cooke was placed on the reserve/COVID-19 list by the Jaguars on December 21, 2020, and activated on December 31. In the 2020 season, Cooke punted 56 times with a 47.66 average.

On March 20, 2021, Cooke signed a four-year, $12 million contract extension with the Jaguars. In the 2021 season, Cooke punted 64 times for a 47.28 average. In the 2022 season, Cooke punted 58 times for a 49.34 average. In the 2023 season, he punted 61 times for 2,893 yards for a 47.43 average. In the 2024 season, he punted 68 times for 3,359 yards for a 49.4 average, and finished second in the league for net yards per punt (44.8). He earned his first Pro Bowl and a second-team All-Pro nomination for his performance.

On June 9, 2025, Cooke signed a four-year, $16 million contract extension with the Jaguars, making him the NFL's highest-paid punter, surpassing AJ Cole, who had set the record just over a week prior. In Week 16 of the 2025 season, Cooke punted six times, landing four inside the 20-yard line in a 34–20 win over the Denver Broncos, earning AFC Special Teams Player of the Week. He finished the 2025 season with 60 punts for 2,878 yards for a 48.0 average

== Career statistics ==
=== NFL ===
Legend
**Bold**	Career high

==== Regular season ====
Year	Team	GP	Punting							
Year	Team	GP	Punts	Yds	Lng	Avg	Net Avg	Blk	Ins20	RetY
2018	JAX	16	**86**	**3,872**	72	45.0	41.3	0	**37**	184
2019	JAX	16	75	3,507	66	46.8	44.5	0	25	127
2020	JAX	14	56	2,669	67	47.7	43.2	0	19	148
2021	JAX	15	64	3,026	68	47.3	44.3	0	28	173
2022	JAX	**17**	58	2,862	70	49.3	43.8	0	24	203
2023	JAX	**17**	61	2,893	65	47.4	43.7	0	29	145
2024	JAX	**17**	68	3,359	**73**	**49.4**	**44.8**	0	34	**251**
2025	JAX	**17**	60	2,878	66	48.0	43.0	0	22	178
2026	JAX	9	29	1,405	60	48.4	43.8	0	12	114
Career		138	557	26,471	73	47.5	43.5	0	230	1,523

==== Postseason ====
Year	Team	GP	Punting							
Year	Team	GP	Punts	Yds	Lng	Avg	Net Avg	Blk	Ins20	RetY
2022	JAX	**2**	**7**	**315**	**58**	45.0	41.7	0	3	23
2025	JAX	1	2	100	**58**	50.0	50.0	0	1	0
Career		3	9	415	58	46.1	43.6	0	4	23

=== College ===
**Year**	**School**	**Conf**	**Class**	**Pos**	**G**	**Punts**	**Yds**	**Avg**
2014	Mississippi State	SEC	FR	K	5	10	414	41.4
2015	Mississippi State	SEC	SO	K	13	44	1,856	42.2
2016	Mississippi State	SEC	JR	PK	10	44	1,760	40.0
2017	Mississippi State	SEC	SR	PK	13	52	2,220	42.7
**Career**	**Mississippi State**					**150**	**6,250**	**41.7**

== See also ==
- List of National Football League career punting yards leaders
