= Rhodanien =

Rhodanien (French, the adjective derived from the river Rhone) may refer to:

- the Rhone river or its valley
- le sillon rhodanien (literally "the furrow of the Rhone"), which is the name of the long, straight Saône and Rhone river valleys, a deep cleft running due south to the Mediterranean and separating the Alps from the Massif Central
- Rhodanien, a dialect of the Lyon région, and of the Franco-Provençal language
- Provençal rhodanien, a dialect of the Nîmes, Arles and Avignon régions, and a sub-dialect of the Provençal dialect
- Le Rhodanien (train), which ran between Geneva/Paris and Marseille

== See also ==
- Rhone (disambiguation)
