= Columbia Academy (Mississippi) =

Segregation academy in Mississippi

Location
- 1548 Hwy 98 E Columbia, Mississippi 39429; United States; 31.2534°N 89.7793°W

Information
- Type: Private school
- Religious affiliation: Christian (no specific denomination)
- Established: 1969
- NCES School ID: 00735909
- Head of school: Angie Burkett
- Teaching staff: 42.9 (on an FTE basis)
- Grades: PK–12
- Gender: Co-educational
- Enrollment: 460 (2017–2018, excluding PK)
- Student to teacher ratio: 10.7
- Colors: Orange, white, and royal blue
- Nickname: Cougars
- Website: www.cacougars.com

Columbia Academy is private school in Columbia, Mississippi, that was founded as a segregation academy in 1969 to provide white-only education.

== History ==
Columbia Academy was created in September 1969 for white students in grades 1-8 as an alternative to attending public schools with black students. Grades 9-12 were added in January 1970, after a meeting at the Marion County Annex. The first headmaster was Thomas Blakeney.

While the school has a non-discriminatory admissions policy, over 99% of the student body are white. As of 2018, the school had 460 students, 457 of whom were white, and designates itself a Christian school. Of the three non-white students, one was Asian, one was Hispanic, and one was black.

Admissions policy excludes married or pregnant students, and any student who becomes married or pregnant is not allowed to continue.

In 2019 Columbia Academy was one of several segregation academies awarded money by the Mississippi State Legislature through a program for students with disabilities, even though the school does not provide services for those students.

== Notable people ==
Logan Cooke, NFL punter
