= Rhon =

Rhon may refer to:

- Rhon psion in the fictional Saga of the Skolian Empire
- Rhön Mountains, Germany
