= Mark Royals =

American football player (born 1965)

No. 14, 5, 3
- Position: Punter

Personal information
- Born: June 22, 1963 (age 63); Mathews, Virginia, U.S.
- Listed height: 6 ft 5 in (1.96 m)
- Listed weight: 225 lb (102 kg)

Career information
- High school: Mathews
- College: Appalachian State
- NFL draft: 1986: undrafted

Career history
- Dallas Cowboys (1986)*; St. Louis Cardinals (1987); Philadelphia Eagles (1987); Phoenix Cardinals (1988)*; Miami Dolphins (1989)*; Tampa Bay Buccaneers (1990–1991); Pittsburgh Steelers (1992–1994); Detroit Lions (1995–1996); New Orleans Saints (1997–1998); Tampa Bay Buccaneers (1999–2001); Miami Dolphins (2002–2003); Jacksonville Jaguars (2003)
- * Offseason or practice squad member only

Awards and highlights
- All-Southern Conference (1983); NFL record: Most punts inside the 20 in a game: 8 (1994; tied with Bryan Barker)

Career NFL statistics
- Punts: 1,116
- Punt yards: 47,021
- Longest punt: 66
- Stats at Pro Football Reference

Mark Alan Royals (born June 22, 1965) is an American former professional football player who was a punter in the National Football League (NFL) for the Philadelphia Eagles, St. Louis Cardinals, Tampa Bay Buccaneers, Pittsburgh Steelers, Detroit Lions, New Orleans Saints, Miami Dolphins and Jacksonville Jaguars. He played college football for the Appalachian State Mountaineers.

== Early life ==
Royals attended Mathews High School, where he practiced football and baseball.

In football, he punted, kicked off and played multiple positions (cornerback, tight end, defensive end).

== College career ==
Royals enrolled at Chowan Junior College. As a freshman, he contributed to the team winning the 1981 East Bowl Championship. As a sophomore, he received All-Conference honors.

Royals transferred after his sophomore season to Appalachian State University. He averaged 42.0 yards in three seasons as a starter.

He finished his college career with six school records: single-game punts (13 vs. The Citadel in 1985), single-season punts (85 in 1984), career punts (231), single-game punting yards (512), single-season punting yards (3,529 in 1984) and career punting yards (9,670).

In 2006, he was inducted into the Chowan Athletics Hall of Fame. In 2009, he was inducted into the Appalachian State University Athletics Hall of Fame.

== Professional career ==
=== Dallas Cowboys ===
Royals was signed as an undrafted free agent by the Dallas Cowboys after the 1986 NFL draft. On August 8, he was released before the start of the season, after not being able to pass incumbent Mike Saxon on the depth chart.

=== St. Louis Cardinals (first stint) ===
On September 30, 1987, he signed as a replacement player with the St. Louis Cardinals, after the NFLPA strike was declared on the third week of the season. In the first strike game against the Washington Redskins, he made six punts for 222 yards (37-yard average). On October 9, he was released after starter Greg Cater crossed the picket line.

=== Philadelphia Eagles ===
On October 14, 1987, he signed as a replacement player with the Philadelphia Eagles, to help solve the kicking problems the team was having. He played in one game against the Green Bay Packers, hitting six punts for a 41.8-yard average. He was cut on October 19, at the end of the strike.

=== Phoenix Cardinals (second stint) ===
On April 1, 1988, he went to training camp with the Phoenix Cardinals. On July 27, he was waived after not beating Greg Horne.

=== Miami Dolphins (first stint) ===
In May 1989, he signed with the Miami Dolphins. On August 28, he was cut after not passing incumbent Reggie Roby on the depth chart.

=== Tampa Bay Buccaneers (first stint) ===
On April 24, 1990, he was signed by the Tampa Bay Buccaneers. He made the team after beating out Chris Mohr. He had 72 punts (40.3-yard avg.) and received All-rookie honors from Football Digest.

In 1991, he hit 84 punts (40.3-yard avg.), while setting a then-franchise record with 22 punts downed inside the 20-yard line. He had six punts for a season-best 46.8-yard average against the New Orleans Saints.

=== Pittsburgh Steelers ===
On March 15, 1992, he signed as a Plan B free agent with the Pittsburgh Steelers. He ranked fifth in the AFC with a 42.7-yard average per punt.

In 1993, he made 89 punts (42.5-yard avg.) and had 22 punts of 50 or more yards. He led the AFC with 28 punts inside the 20 and just three touchbacks. He received AFC Special Teams Player of the Week honors in the ninth game against the Buffalo Bills, after hitting a 58-yarder and downing three punts inside the 20. He had a career-high 11 punts against the New England Patriots.

Royals is also known for a bad punt he kicked in the AFC wildcard game between the Steelers and the Kansas City Chiefs on January 8, 1994. Near the end of the fourth quarter with Pittsburgh leading Kansas City by seven points, Royals failed to direct a punt towards a sideline, and instead, punted the ball forward directly towards the line of scrimmage. The punt was blocked and recovered by Kansas City. With 1:43 remaining in the fourth quarter and on 4th down, Kansas City quarterback Joe Montana threw a touchdown pass to receiver Tim Barnett. The ensuing PAT tied the game which then went into sudden death overtime. Kansas City kicker Nick Lowery eventually kicked the game winning field goal for the Chiefs eliminating the Steelers from the playoffs.

In 1994, he set club records with 97 punts and 3,849 punt yards, while averaging 39.7 yards and tying an NFL record with 35 punts downed inside the 20-yard line. He tied his career-best with 11 punts and set a career-high eight punts downed inside the 20, in the ninth game against the Houston Oilers. He averaged 44.4 yards per punt with a long of 55 yards in the AFC Championship Game against the San Diego Chargers.

Royals left as one of the punting leaders in franchise history with 259 punts (fourth), a 41.5-yard average (fourth) and 85 punts downed inside the 20-yard line (second).

=== Detroit Lions ===
On April 26, 1995, he signed as a free agent with the Detroit Lions. He averaged 42.0 yards per punt and hit a career-high 69-yarder. He had 6 punts for a 48.8-yard average against the Atlanta Falcons.

In 1996, he had 69 punts for a 43.8-yard average. He tallied a 49.8-yard average per punt against the New York Giants.

=== New Orleans Saints ===
On April 25, 1997, he was signed as a free agent by the New Orleans Saints. He led the league and set a franchise record with a 45.9-yard average. He also placed 21 punts inside the 20 and posted a net average of 34.9 yards. He was named NFC Special Teams Player of the Week, after hitting six punts for a 57-yard average against the Arizona Cardinals.

In 1998, he led the NFC with a 45.6-yard average on 88 punts, while setting a team record by leading the NFC in gross average in two consecutive seasons. He set a career-high net average of 36.0 yards and downed 26 punts inside the 20. He hit seven punts for a 53.1-yard average against the Indianapolis Colts. He was named NFC Special Teams Player of the Week, after downing 5 punts inside the 20-yard line, including three in the fourth quarter against the Tampa Bay Buccaneers.

On June 29, 1999, he was cut after the team signed free agent Tommy Barnhardt.

=== Tampa Bay Buccaneers (second stint) ===
On August 4, 1999, he was signed as a free agent by the Tampa Bay Buccaneers to replace Barnhardt. He appeared in all 16 games and ranked third in the NFC with a team single-season record gross average of 43.13 yards on 90 punts. He also ranked second in the conference with a net average of 37.4 (second in team history) and downed 23 punts inside the 20 (second in team history).

In 2000, he appeared in all 16 games, punting 85 times for 3,551 yards (41.8-yard avg.), including a long of 63 yards. He averaged 49.9 yards on seven punts against the New York Jets. In the 41–13 win over the Minnesota Vikings, he did not attempt a punt for the first time in his career. He completed a 36-yard pass to Damien Robinson on a fake punt and averaged 48.3 yards on four punts against the Atlanta Falcons.

In 2001, he punted 83 times for 3,382 yards (40.7-yard avg.), including a long of 61 yards, while setting the club's single-season record with 26 punts inside the 20. He had seven punts for 319 yards (45.6-yard avg.) against the Detroit Lions, downing two inside the 20, including a season-long 61-yarder. He broke Frank Garcia's franchise record for career punts with his 378th against the St. Louis Cardinals.

On March 1, 2002, he was released because of salary cap considerations.

=== Miami Dolphins (second stint) ===
On April 15, 2002, he was signed as a free agent by the Miami Dolphins, after they were not able to reach a contract agreement with Matt Turk. He punted 69 times for 2,772 yards, a 40.2-yard average (his worst average in 13 seasons as a starting punter), a net of 34.5 (eighth in the AFC) and 15 punts inside the 20. He also served as the holder on placements. Against the Detroit Lions, he had a season-best 47.8-yard average on five punts, including a long punt of 56 yards. Against the Indianapolis Colts, he had a 47.3-yard average on four punts and a season-high with two punts inside the 20.

On September 27, 2003, he was released after averaging 40.2 yards on 16 punts during the first three games of the season, ranking him among the worst punters in the NFL, and continuing the trend of his punting average continually dropping five straight seasons. He was replaced with Turk.

=== Jacksonville Jaguars ===
On October 10, 2003, he signed as a free agent with the Jacksonville Jaguars, to replace Pro Bowler Chris Hanson. During that season, head coach Jack Del Rio placed a wooden stump and axe in the Jaguars locker room as a symbol of his theme advising players to "keep choppin' wood". After his teammates had been taking swings at the wood with the axe, Hanson followed and ended up seriously wounding his non-kicking foot, which forced him to be placed on injured reserve on October 10. Royals punted 45 times for 1,852 yards and a 41.2 average. He was not re-signed after the season.

== NFL career statistics ==
Legend
	Led the league
**Bold**	Career high

=== Regular season ===
Year	Team	Punting									
Year	Team	GP	Punts	Yds	Net Yds	Lng	Avg	Net Avg	Blk	Ins20	TB
1987	STL	1	6	222	103	46	37.0	17.2	0	2	0
1987	PHI	1	5	209	153	48	41.8	30.6	0	1	1
1990	TAM	**16**	72	2,902	2,450	62	40.3	34.0	0	8	5
1991	TAM	**16**	84	3,389	2,710	56	40.3	32.3	0	22	6
1992	PIT	**16**	73	3,119	2,631	58	42.7	35.6	1	22	9
1993	PIT	**16**	89	3,781	3,043	61	42.5	34.2	0	28	3
1994	PIT	**16**	**97**	3,849	**3,466**	64	39.7	35.7	0	**35**	6
1995	DET	**16**	57	2,393	1,831	60	42.0	31.0	**2**	15	6
1996	DET	**16**	69	3,020	2,341	60	43.8	33.4	1	11	8
1997	NOR	**16**	88	**4,038**	3,072	**66**	**45.9**	34.9	0	21	**13**
1998	NOR	**16**	88	4,017	3,168	64	45.6	36.0	0	26	10
1999	TAM	**16**	90	3,882	3,362	**66**	43.1	**37.4**	0	23	8
2000	TAM	**16**	85	3,551	2,983	63	41.8	35.1	0	17	8
2001	TAM	**16**	83	3,382	2,842	61	40.7	34.2	0	26	8
2002	MIA	**16**	69	2,772	2,379	56	40.2	34.5	0	15	6
2003	MIA	3	16	643	581	50	40.2	36.3	0	5	1
2003	JAX	11	45	1,852	1,567	51	41.2	34.8	0	9	5
Career		224	1,116	47,021	38,682	66	42.1	34.5	4	286	103

=== Playoffs ===
Year	Team	Punting									
Year	Team	GP	Punts	Yds	Net Yds	Lng	Avg	Net Avg	Blk	Ins20	TB
1992	PIT	1	3	112	92	44	37.3	30.7	0	2	1
1993	PIT	1	6	268	212	51	**44.7**	30.3	**1**	1	1
1994	PIT	**2**	10	413	291	55	41.3	29.1	0	2	**4**
1995	DET	1	5	187	174	48	37.4	34.8	0	1	0
1999	TAM	**2**	**15**	**620**	**546**	53	41.3	36.4	0	**6**	1
2000	TAM	1	6	243	205	**56**	40.5	34.2	0	0	0
2001	TAM	1	5	208	198	48	41.6	**39.6**	0	0	0
Career		9	50	2,051	1,718	56	41.0	33.7	1	12	7

== Personal life ==
Royals was a color commentator for coverage of the Arena Football League's Tampa Bay Storm on the regional sports television network Spectrum Sports Florida. He also co-hosted various sports radio shows.
