= Coffin corner (American football) =

Part of the playing field in American football

The coffin corner refers to the corner of the playing field in American football just in front of the end zone, from about the 5-yard line to the goal line, where the punter attempts to place their kick as to minimize the opposing team's field position. A perfect coffin corner kick is one that goes out of bounds just before either orange pylon located in the front of the end zone. The punter tries to place the ball so that it lands out of bounds or is downed on the field by another member of the kicking team anywhere inside the 5-yard line without touching the goal line, thus forcing poor field position for the receiving team on their next offensive series.

The term comes from the "coffin corner" found in Victorian houses (the slang and often refuted term for a decorative niche, or very small "corner", cut into the wall of a staircase landing), as the target area is very small. A high level of skill is required to execute such a punt, for if the kick is slightly too far into the end zone or if a member of the kicking team touches the goal line while maintaining possession of or touching the ball, a touchback is awarded, costing the kicking team the advantage that comes with a successful execution of the kick. If the ball goes out of bounds too far upfield, the receiving team will usually have more options on offense, such as being able to drop back for a pass without fear of possibly giving up a safety.

More often than not, a kicker's attempt to land the ball accurately within the coffin corner fails, as the amount of skill required to angle a kick inside such a small area is extraordinary. In recent years, as punters have become more adept at kicking the ball so as not to have it bounce forward after landing, punting teams have increasingly eschewed coffin corner punts in favor of kicking inbounds and downing the ball before it reaches the end zone.
