= Kevin Huber =

American football player (born 1985)

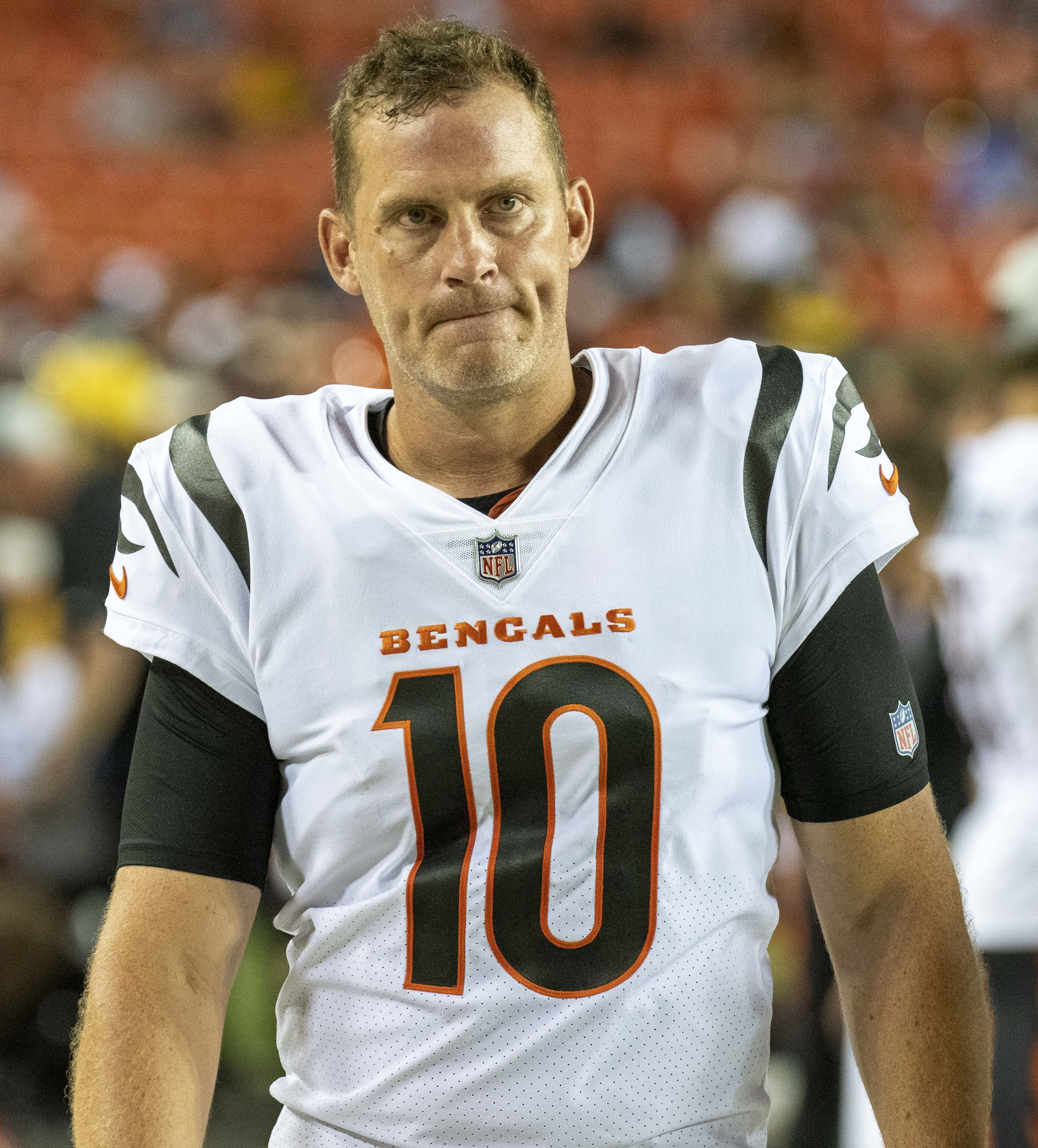
- Huber with the Cincinnati Bengals in 2021

No. 10
- Position: Punter

Personal information
- Born: July 16, 1985 (age 41); Cincinnati, Ohio, U.S.
- Listed height: 6 ft 1 in (1.85 m)
- Listed weight: 210 lb (95 kg)

Career information
- High school: McNicholas (Cincinnati)
- College: Cincinnati (2005–2008)
- NFL draft: 2009: 5th round, 142nd overall pick

Career history
- Cincinnati Bengals (2009–2022)

Awards and highlights
- Pro Bowl (2014); 2× Consensus All-American (2007, 2008); Big East Special Teams Player of the Year (2007); 2× First-team All-Big East (2007, 2008)

Career NFL statistics
- Punts: 1,011
- Punting yards: 45,766
- Punting average: 45.3
- Longest punt: 75
- Inside 20: 346
- Stats at Pro Football Reference

Kevin J. Huber (born July 16, 1985) is an American former professional football player who was a punter for 14 seasons with the Cincinnati Bengals of the National Football League (NFL). He played college football for the Cincinnati Bearcats, twice earning consensus All-American honors, before being selected by the Bengals in the fifth round of the 2009 NFL draft. Huber currently holds the Bengals franchise record for most games played at 216.

== Early life ==
Huber was born in Cincinnati, Ohio. He attended Immaculate Heart of Mary in Cincinnati for grade school and then attended Archbishop McNicholas High School in Cincinnati. Huber and played for the McNicholas Rockets high school football team. He was a three-time all-conference selection and was named the Greater Catholic League's Punter of the Year following his junior and senior seasons.

== College career ==
Huber attended the University of Cincinnati, where he played for the Cincinnati Bearcats football team from 2005 to 2008. As a junior in 2007, and again as a senior in 2008, Huber was recognized as a consensus first-team All-American. He holds the record for longest punt in Bearcats' history at 69 yards, which was set on September 17, 2007, at Memphis.

=== Awards and honors ===
- 2007 first-team All-American (AP, WCFF, Sporting News)
- 2007 Big East Special Teams Player of the Year
- 2008 first-team All-American (Rivals.com, AFCA FWAA SI.com)

== Professional career ==
=== Cincinnati Bengals ===
The Cincinnati Bengals selected Huber in the fifth round with the 142nd overall pick in the 2009 NFL draft, and he played for the Bengals from the 2009 season to the 2022 season.

During Week 15 of 2013 against the Pittsburgh Steelers, Huber suffered a fractured jaw when he was blocked by linebacker Terence Garvin. It was reported that Huber had also suffered a vertebral fracture in his neck, and would miss the remainder of the season. NFL head of officials Dean Blandino was critical of Ed Hochuli's officiating crew Tuesday night, saying it got the play wrong. Garvin's hit wasn't clean by rule and should have been deemed illegal. Garvin was subsequently fined $25,000.

Huber holds Bengals franchise career records for gross punting average (44.2 yards) and net average (39.1) through the 2013 season, as well as the season records in both categories (set in 2012).

On March 14, 2018, Huber signed a three-year contract extension with the Bengals. On March 22, 2021, Huber re-signed on a one-year contract with the Bengals.

Huber signed a one-year contract with the Bengals on May 2, 2022.

In Week 1 of the 2022 season, Huber started his 208th career game for the Bengals, surpassing Ken Riley's franchise record for most games played. On December 5, 2022, Huber was officially released from the Bengals after 14 seasons and after playing in his 216th game. Huber was re-signed to the practice squad two days later.

=== Retirement ===
On July 7, 2023, Huber announced his retirement through his Twitter profile.

== NFL career statistics ==
Legend
	Led the league
**Bold**	Career high

Year	Team	GP	Punting				
Year	Team	GP	Punts	Yds	Avg	Blk	Lng
2009	CIN	16	86	3,713	43.2	0	61
2010	CIN	16	71	2,992	42.1	**1**	72
2011	CIN	16	**91**	4,023	44.2	0	71
2012	CIN	16	76	3,540	46.6	0	69
2013	CIN	14	66	2,982	45.2	0	**75**
2014	CIN	16	73	3,419	46.8	0	69
2015	CIN	16	68	3,116	45.8	**1**	67
2016	CIN	16	78	3,613	46.3	0	72
2017	CIN	16	88	**4,101**	46.6	**1**	63
2018	CIN	16	71	3,119	43.9	**1**	69
2019	CIN	16	75	3,394	45.3	0	63
2020	CIN	16	71	3,350	**47.2**	0	72
2021	CIN	17	66	3,064	46.4	0	61
2022	CIN	9	31	1,340	43.2	0	63
Career		216	1,011	45,766	45.3	4	75

=== Postseason ===
Year	Team	GP	Punting				
Year	Team	GP	Punts	Yds	Avg	Blk	Lng
2009	CIN	1	4	192	48.0	0	56
2011	CIN	1	3	145	**48.3**	0	55
2012	CIN	1	5	233	46.6	0	53
2014	CIN	1	8	380	47.5	0	**62**
2015	CIN	1	6	255	42.5	0	51
2021	CIN	4	**16**	**674**	42.1	0	57
Career		9	42	1,879	44.7	0	62

== Personal life ==
Huber has been married since 2017.
