= Bryan Barker =

American football player (born 1964)

No. 4, 9
- Position: Punter

Personal information
- Born: June 28, 1964 (age 62); Jacksonville Beach, Florida, U.S.
- Listed height: 6 ft 1 in (1.85 m)
- Listed weight: 202 lb (92 kg)

Career information
- High school: Orinda (CA) Miramonte
- College: Santa Clara
- NFL draft: 1988: undrafted

Career history
- Denver Broncos (1988)*; Seattle Seahawks (1989)*; Kansas City Chiefs (1990–1993); Minnesota Vikings (1994)*; Philadelphia Eagles (1994); Jacksonville Jaguars (1995–2000); Washington Redskins (2001–2003); Green Bay Packers (2004); St. Louis Rams (2005)
- * Offseason or practice squad member only

Awards and highlights
- First-team All-Pro (1997); Pro Bowl (1997); NFL record: Most punts inside the 20 in a game: 8 (1999; tied with Mark Royals)

Career NFL statistics
- Punts: 1,132
- Punting yards: 47,641
- Punting average: 42.1
- Stats at Pro Football Reference

Bryan Christopher Barker (born June 28, 1964) is an American former professional football player who was a punter in the National Football League (NFL). He played college football for the Santa Clara Broncos.

Barker last played for the St. Louis Rams in 2005. Barker has previously played with the Kansas City Chiefs, Philadelphia Eagles, Jacksonville Jaguars, Washington Redskins, and Green Bay Packers.

On November 28, 2002, during week 13 of the NFL season against the Dallas Cowboys, Barker experienced a severely broken nose, a subdural hematoma, while playing in a nationally televised game.

Aaron Schatz of statistics site Football Outsiders noted a punt Barker kicked "in 1999 that was just ridiculous, far past any baseline I had ever created. In Week 5, on the road against the Jets, [Barker] punted the ball from the Jaguars' own 5-yard line to the Jets' 12-yard line, an 83-yard punt
