= Rhone (disambiguation) =

Rhone can refer to:

- Rhône, one of the major rivers of Europe, running through Switzerland and France
- Rhône (department), a department in France along the river
- Rhône Glacier, the source of the Rhône River and one of the primary contributors to Lake Geneva in the far eastern end of the canton of Valais in Switzerland
- Rhone Glacier (Antarctica)
- Rhône Group, a private equity firm
- Rhone (brand), an American sportswear company
- Rhône wine, a wine grown in France
- Le Rhône, a type of aircraft engine initially created in 1910 by Société des Moteurs Le Rhône
- Gnome et Rhône (1915–1945), a French aircraft engine factory after merging Société des Moteurs Le Rhône
- RMS Rhone (1865–1867), a former British Royal Mail Ship that became a shipwreck
- Arthur Rhoné (1836–1910), an amateur French Egyptologist

== See also ==
- Rhodanien (disambiguation)
