= Rohn Stark =

American football player (born 1959)

No. 3
- Position: Punter

Personal information
- Born: May 4, 1959 (age 67); Minneapolis, Minnesota, U.S.
- Listed height: 6 ft 3 in (1.91 m)
- Listed weight: 203 lb (92 kg)

Career information
- High school: Pine River (Pine River, Minnesota)
- College: Florida State
- NFL draft: 1982: 2nd round, 34th overall pick

Career history
- Baltimore / Indianapolis Colts (1982–1994); Pittsburgh Steelers (1995); Carolina Panthers (1996); Seattle Seahawks (1997)

Awards and highlights
- First-team All-Pro (1983); 4x Second-team All-Pro (1985, 1986, 1990, 1992); 4× Pro Bowl (1985, 1986, 1990, 1992); PFWA All-Rookie Team (1982); Consensus All-American (1980); First-team All-American (1981); NFL record: Highest net average punting yards in a game: 59.50 (1992)

Career NFL statistics
- Punts: 1,141
- Punt yards: 49,471
- Longest punt: 72
- Stats at Pro Football Reference

Rohn Taylor Stark (born May 4, 1959) is an American former professional football player who was a punter for 16 seasons in the National Football League (NFL), 13 of those with the Baltimore/Indianapolis Colts. Stark was selected to four Pro Bowls in his stay with the Colts and then played in Super Bowl XXX as a member of the Pittsburgh Steelers.

Stark was one of the last players who played for the Colts prior to their relocation to Indianapolis to retire from the NFL. Stark is also the only Baltimore Colts player to ever play against the Baltimore Ravens.

== High school ==
In Pine River, Minnesota, Stark attended Pine River High, starring in football, basketball and track (while taking time out from track practice to pinch-hit for the baseball team). In football, he played both defense and offense and handled the punting and place kicking duties.

=== Air Force Academy ===
After high school graduation, Stark headed for the Air Force Academy Preparatory School in Colorado Springs. He had always been interested in flying—his father, Bud Stark, is a TWA pilot—and had received a conditional appointment to the academy. Eventually, Air Force doctors discovered that Stark had a slight curvature of the spine and could not fly in the US Air Force; it would be too dangerous for him to use an ejection seat. So, he returned home in January 1978. What Stark didn't know was that his prep-school trigonometry professor and football coach, John Crowe, had sent game films of him to Florida State, where Crowe had been an All-America defensive back in 1958. Stark got a call from a Seminole coach in February. "I had barely heard of Florida State", he says, "but I went down and liked what I saw." He enrolled for the spring semester and competed in the high jump for FSU.

== College career ==
From the official Florida State Seminoles website: "One of the greatest all-around athletes ever to wear the garnet and gold of Florida State, Stark starred as a punter and decathlete for the Seminoles. After his four-year career as FSU's punter was over, Stark had virtually every record including most career punts, highest season average (46.0) and highest career average (42.7). He earned first-team All-America honors in 1980 and 1981 and was a team captain as a senior." At the end of his college football career, Stark was considered one of the best college punters since Ray Guy played for Southern Mississippi in the early 1970s. "The spring of his senior year, he cemented his spot as one of FSU's all-time greats, winning All-America honors as a decathlete as well. In 1986, he was inducted into the Florida State Hall of Fame, in Football and Track/Field." He seriously considered participation in the 1984 Olympics.

Stark kicked left-footed. To returners, that means the ball is spinning the "wrong" way and is a little harder to handle; FSU opponents had fumbled about one of Stark's punts per game in his three-year career. The fact that Stark had never had a punt blocked also interested scouts. In his 16 seasons in the NFL, he only had 7 blocked punts.

== Retirement ==
After retiring from the NFL, Stark and his family made their home in Maui, where he works in real estate.

== NFL career statistics ==
Legend
	Led the league
**Bold**	Career high

Regular season

Season	Team	GP	Punting					
Season	Team	GP	Punts	Yards	Y/P	Net	In20	TB
1982	BAL	9	46	2,044	44.4	34.3	8	12
1983	BAL	16	91	4,124	45.3	36.3	19	9
1984	IND	16	**98**	**4,383**	44.7	37.2	21	7
1985	IND	16	78	3,584	**45.9**	34.2	12	**14**
1986	IND	16	76	3,432	45.2	37.2	22	5
1987	IND	12	61	2,440	40.0	30.9	12	7
1988	IND	16	64	2,784	43.5	34.5	15	8
1989	IND	16	79	3,392	42.9	32.9	14	10
1990	IND	16	71	3,084	43.4	37.4	**23**	3
1991	IND	16	82	3,492	42.6	34.8	14	6
1992	IND	16	83	3,716	44.8	**39.3**	22	7
1993	IND	16	83	3,595	43.3	35.9	18	13
1994	IND	16	73	3,092	42.4	34.1	22	10
1995	PIT	16	59	2,368	40.1	33.3	20	11
1996	CAR	16	77	3,128	40.6	36.0	21	9
1997	SEA	4	20	813	40.7	26.9	7	2
Career		233	1,141	49,471	43.4	35.2	270	133
