= Punter (gridiron football) =

Gridiron football special teams position

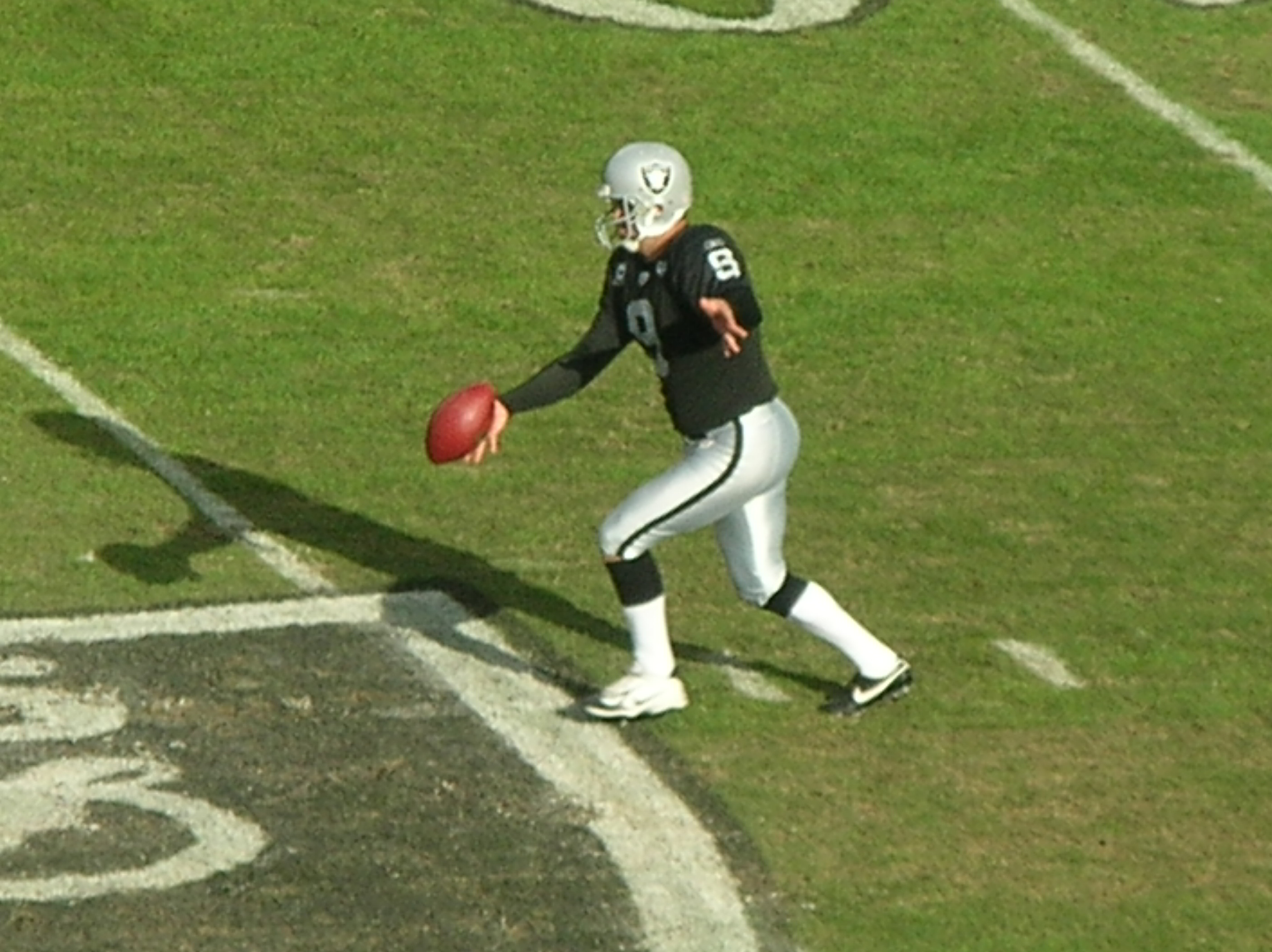
Shane Lechler of the Oakland Raiders punts the ball in November 2008.

A punter in gridiron football is a special teams player who receives the snapped ball directly from the line of scrimmage and then punts (kicks) the football to the opposing team so as to limit any field position advantage. This generally happens on a fourth down in American football and a third down in Canadian football. Punters may also occasionally take part in fake punts in those same situations, when they throw or run the football to get a first down instead of punting.

== Skills and usage ==
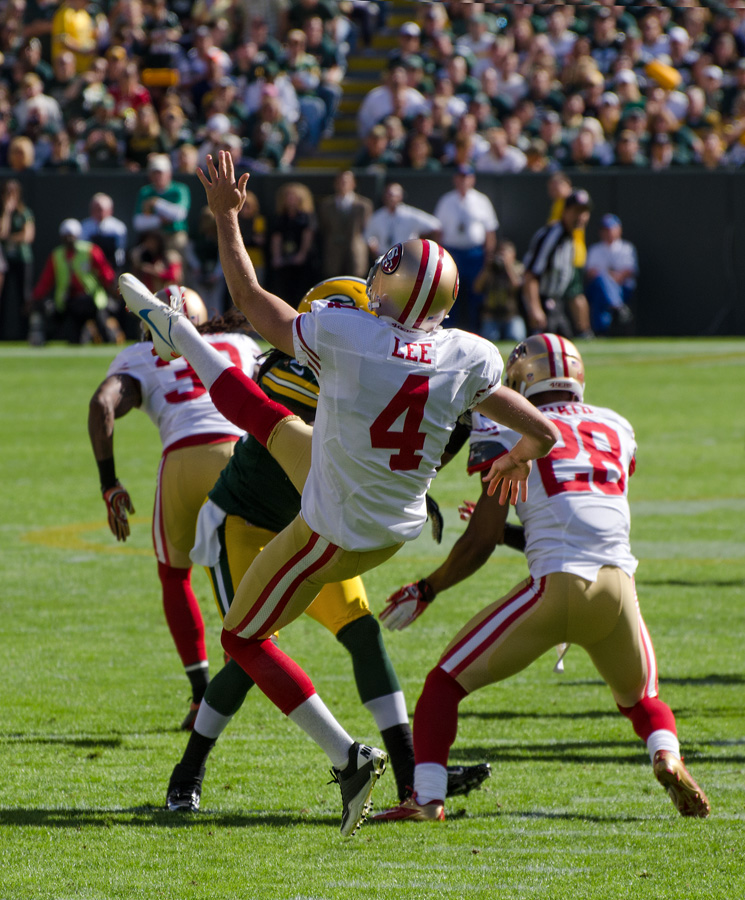
Andy Lee punting for the 49ers

The purpose of the punt is to force the team that is receiving the kick to start as far as possible from the punting team's end zone. Accordingly, the most effective punts land just outside the receiving team's end zone and land either out of bounds (making it impossible to advance the ball until the next play) or after being kicked exceptionally high (allowing the kicking team time to run down the field and prevent the punt returner from advancing the ball). Punters therefore must be able to kick the ball high, long distances, and precisely. One standard is that a punt should be in the air for at least 1 second for every 10 yards it travels, but the linear relationship drops off once it hits over 50 yards.

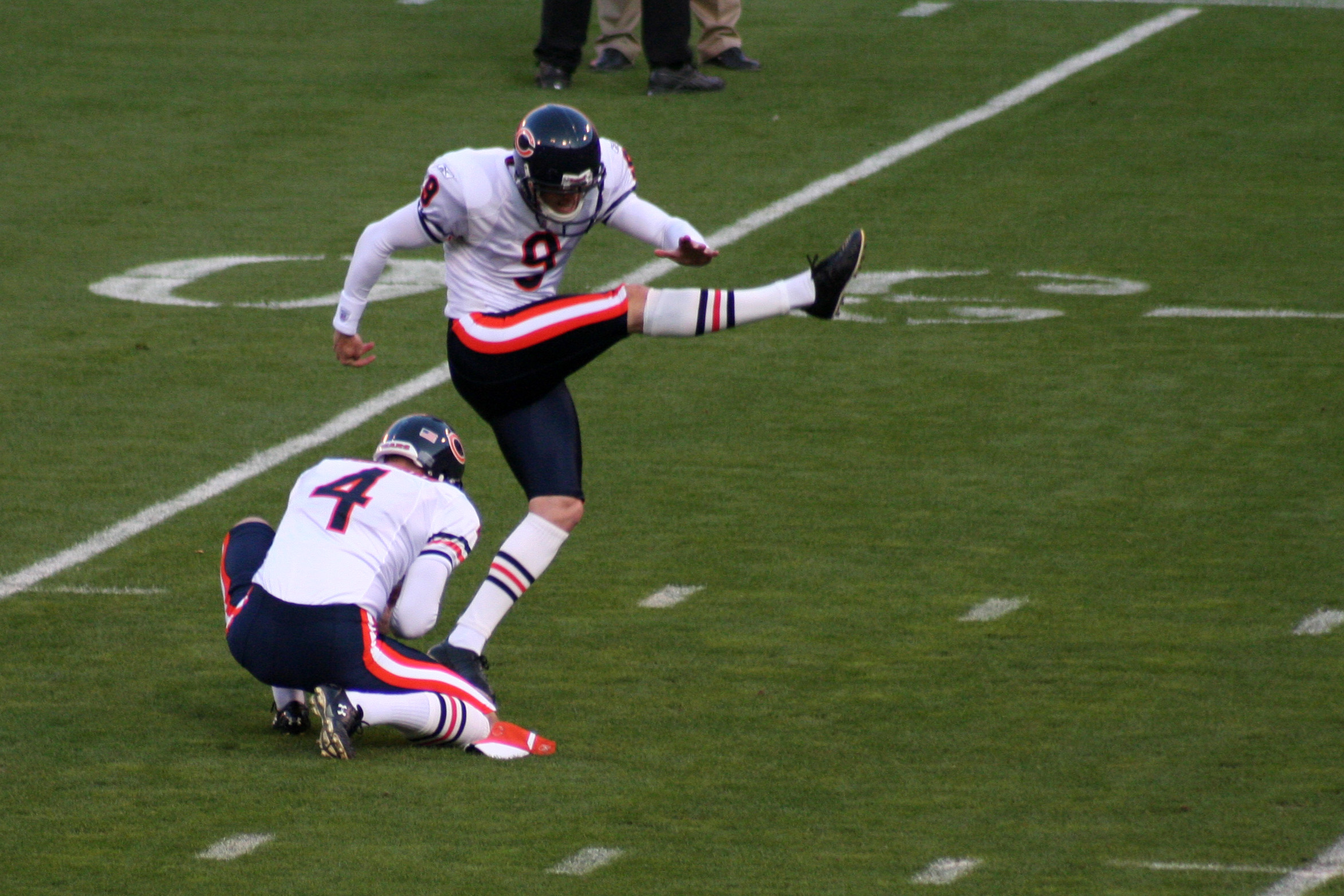
Chicago Bears punter Brad Maynard (#4) holds for placekicker Robbie Gould.

Punters may also impart a spin to the ball that makes it harder to catch, increasing the odds of a muff which may lead to the punter's team regaining possession.

The punter frequently serves as the holder on field goal attempts. The punter has typically developed chemistry with the long snapper and is thus accustomed to catching a long-snapped ball. Additionally, punters are also kickers and understand kicking mechanics, such as how far back to lean the ball as the kicker makes an attempt, and when a field goal attempt should be aborted. Punters may pass or run the ball on fake field goal attempts and fake punts.

Many punters also double duty as kickoff specialists because most punters have been at one point placekickers as well, and some, such as Craig Hentrich, have filled in as worthy backup placekickers. Brett Maher played as placekicker and punter for the Nebraska Cornhuskers winning both the Bakken–Andersen Kicker of the Year and the Eddleman–Fields Punter of the Year—awarded to the top player in the Big Ten Conference—in the 2011 season. Punters rarely receive much attention or fan support, in part because they are called upon when a team's offense has just failed.

== Career lengths ==
Certain punters can have exceptionally long careers, compared to other NFL position players (there is a similar tendency with kickers). One reason for this is that their limited time on the field and heavy protection by penalties against defensive players for late hits makes them far less likely to be injured than other positions. Sean Landeta, for instance, played 19 NFL seasons and three USFL seasons for eight different teams. Jeff Feagles played 22 seasons as a punter, on five different teams.

Conversely, placekickers and punters can also have very short careers, mainly because of a lack of opportunity. Since the risk of injury is remote, NFL teams typically only carry one punter on their roster at any given time. Thus, the only opportunity a punter has of breaking into the league is if the incumbent punter leaves the team or is injured. Some NFL teams will carry two punters during the preseason, but the second punter is typically "camp fodder" and rarely makes the opening day roster. Unlike backups at other positions, backup placekickers and punters are not employed by any given team until they are needed. Most indoor American football teams, because of smaller rosters and fields along with rules that either ban or discourage punting, do not employ punting specialists.

== Notable records ==
Bob Cameron of the Winnipeg Blue Bombers (CFL), in a 23-year career, has the most career punting yards, with 134,301 yards.

Jeff Feagles holds the NFL record for career punting yards with 71,211 yards. He played from 1988 to 2009 for five different teams in the NFL.

Two CFL punters share the record for the longest punt in professional football history at 108 yards. Such a punt is theoretically possible in American football, but would likely result in a touchback, moreover this would require the line of scrimmage to be on the punting team's two yard line, thus increasing the difficulty of achieving an exceptionally long punt.

Steve O'Neal set the record for the longest punt in a National Football League game in 1969 with a punt measuring 98 yards. It is the longest recorded punt in a game possible that did not end in a touchback.

== Draft status ==
Former Oakland Raiders player Ray Guy is the only pure punter to be inducted into the Pro Football Hall of Fame, as well as the only pure punter to be picked in the first round of the NFL draft. Russell Erxleben was selected as the 11th pick in the first round of the 1979 draft by the New Orleans Saints as a punter, but performed other kicking duties as well. Guy is credited with raising the status of punters in the NFL because he proved to be a major ingredient in the Raiders' success during the 1970s by preventing opponents from gaining field position advantage.

== Evolution ==
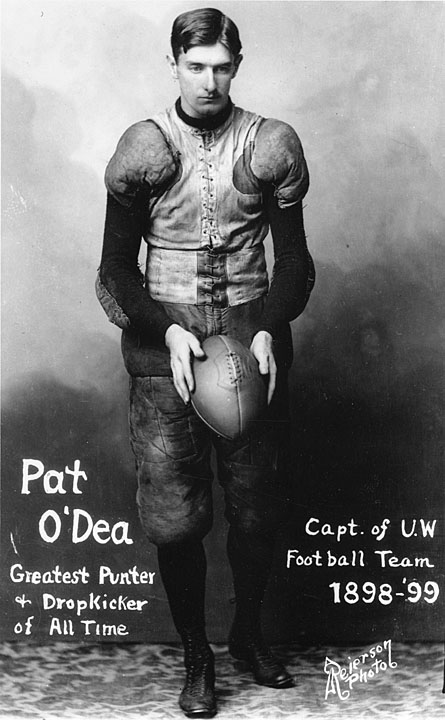
Pat O'Dea was a punter and fullback for Wisconsin.

Before Guy's arrival in Oakland, many teams trained a position player to double as a punter (the placekicker was likewise expected to "double-up" at another position), even after the one-platoon system (which effectively required a punter to play offensive and defensive positions on top of their duties) was abolished in the 1940s. The Green Bay Packers won Super Bowl I and Super Bowl II using running back Donny Anderson as their punter. The Packers' regular placekicker, Don Chandler, was an All-Pro punter with the New York Giants, but Vince Lombardi brought Chandler in from his old team to serve exclusively as a kicker after Paul Hornung, who set the NFL single-season scoring record with 176 points in 12 games in 1960, was suspended for gambling in 1963 and suffered a sharp decline in accuracy in 1964. Linebacker Paul Maguire served as a punter for the AFL-champion San Diego Chargers and Buffalo Bills in the 1960s.

The Kansas City Chiefs, who played in Super Bowl I and won Super Bowl IV, bucked the trend at the time by signing Jerrel Wilson as a punting specialist in 1966. Wilson punted for the Chiefs for 13 seasons, and combined with placekicker Jan Stenerud to give the team one of the best kicking combinations in the league.

Backup quarterbacks were often used to punt well into the 1970s. Steve Spurrier, who was stuck behind John Brodie at quarterback for the San Francisco 49ers, served as the team's main punter for the first four years of his career. Bob Lee took on the same role for the Minnesota Vikings in the late 1960s and early 1970s, punting for the club in Super Bowl IV.

Danny White played little as a backup quarterback to Roger Staubach with the Dallas Cowboys from 1976 through 1979, but was the team's main punter from 1975 through 1984, when he gave up the kicking duties to Mike Saxon.

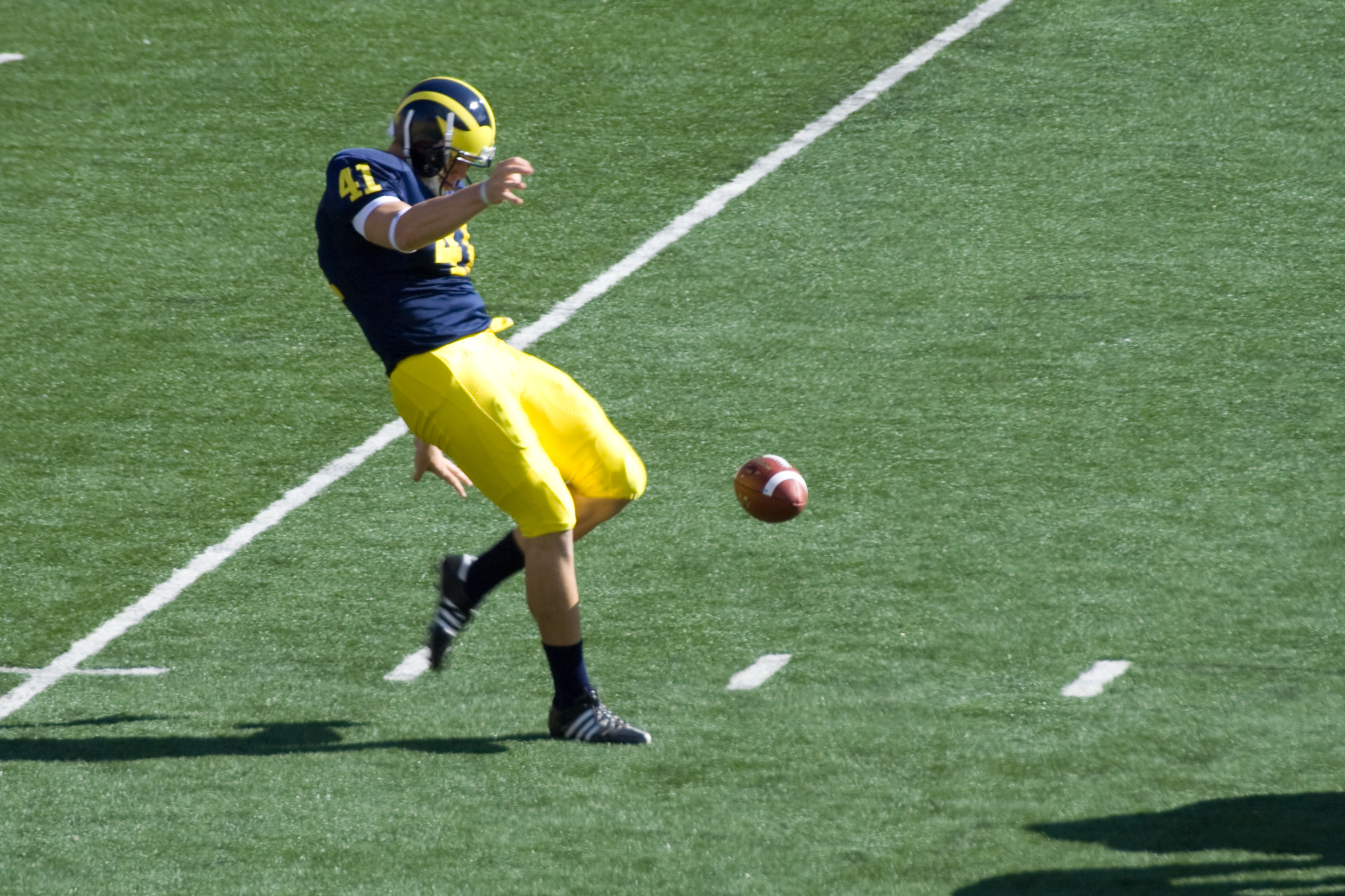
Zoltán Meskó punting for the Michigan Wolverines in 2008

One of the last examples of a punting quarterback was Tom Tupa. A quarterback and punter in college, Tupa started his career in the NFL as a quarterback, but eventually settled into a role as a full-time punter and emergency quarterback.

Starting in the 1990s, some NFL teams turned to retired Australian rules football players to punt for them, as punting is a basic skill in that game. Darren Bennett, who played for the San Diego Chargers and Minnesota Vikings in his career, was one of the first successful Australian rules football players to make the jump from that sport's top professional competition, the Australian Football League (AFL), to the NFL, doing so in 1994. Ben Graham, who entered the league with the New York Jets, became the first AFL player to play in a Super Bowl when he played in Super Bowl XLIII with the Arizona Cardinals. Other former AFL players who made the transition to NFL punters include former NFL punter Mat McBriar and Sav Rocca, formerly of the Washington Redskins. In recent years, an increasing number of Australians have been making the transition to gridiron football at earlier ages, with a significant number now playing for U.S. college teams.

Between 2013 and 2017, all five Ray Guy Awards, presented to the top punter in NCAA Division I football, were won by Australians: Tom Hornsey (Memphis, 2013), Tom Hackett (Utah, 2014 and 2015), Mitch Wishnowsky (Utah, 2016) and Michael Dickson (Texas, 2017). All three finalists for the 2016 award were Australians. In the 2018 season, nearly one-fourth of the schools in college football's top level, Division I FBS, had at least one Australian punter on their roster.

Sam Koch revolutionized punting by developing many variations, due to his flexible hips in an effort to increase net punting average by giving the ball variable trajectories and bounce, making it more difficult for returners to catch and return.

The New England Patriots were noted for almost exclusively employing left-footed punters during the coaching tenure of Bill Belichick, who claimed it was unintentional. Left-footed punters have been increasingly used at the NFL level. At the start of the 2001 NFL season, there were 26 right-footed punters, four left-footed ones and one (Chris Hanson) who was dual-footed. By the 2017 NFL season, there were 22 right-footed punters and 10 left-footed ones.

By the late 2010s and early 2020s, punters were highly specialized players on an NFL roster. Louis Bien of SB Nation wrote:

A punter's job is no longer simply to kick the ball high and far while fans hold their collective breath that this time isn't the time when the ball flies sideways into the stands. No, punters are now neutralizing and terrorizing the most electric return men in the NFL with kicks that spin and move and bounce and flip in all sorts of unpredictable, terror-inducing ways.
