= Willie Jones (fullback) =

American football player (1939–2016)

No. 33, 27, 25
- Position: Fullback

Personal information
- Born: August 30, 1939; Angleton, Texas, U.S.
- Died: September 9, 2016 (aged 77); Indianapolis, Indiana, U.S.
- Listed height: 5 ft 11 in (1.80 m)
- Listed weight: 208 lb (94 kg)

Career information
- High school: Robstown (Robstown, Texas)
- College: Purdue
- NFL draft: 1961: 17th round, 225th overall pick

Career history
- Edmonton Eskimos (1961)*; Indianapolis Warriors (1961); Buffalo Bills (1962); Indianapolis Warriors (1963–1964)
- * Offseason or practice squad member only

Awards and highlights
- Second-team All-Big Ten (1960)

Career AFL statistics
- Rushing yards: 17
- Rushing average: 4.3
- Return yards: 287
- Stats at Pro Football Reference

Willie Douglas Jones Jr. (August 30, 1939 – September 9, 2016) was an American professional football player who was a fullback for one season with the Buffalo Bills of the American Football League (AFL). He played college football for the Purdue Boilermakers and was selected by the Minnesota Vikings in the 17th round of the 1961 NFL draft. He also played for the Indianapolis Warriors of the United Football League.

== Early life ==
Willie Douglas Jones Jr. was born on August 30, 1939, in Angleton, Texas. He first attended Solomon Coles High School in Corpus Christi, Texas before transferring to Robstown High School in Robstown, Texas.

== College career ==
Jones played college football for the Purdue Boilermakers of Purdue University. He was on the freshman team in 1957 and was a two-year letterman from 1959 to 1960. He rushed 40 times for 148 yards in 1959 while also catching one pass for 13 yards. In 1960, Jones totaled 124 carries for 575 yards and five touchdowns and three receptions for 37 yards and one touchdown, earned Associated Press second-team All-Big Ten honors. He graduated from Purdue with a bachelor's in business administration.

== Professional career ==
Jones was selected by the Minnesota Vikings in the 17th round, with the 225th overall pick, of the 1961 NFL draft. He instead signed with the Edmonton Eskimos of the Canadian Football League but was later released.

Jones signed with the Indianapolis Warriors of the United Football League on August 29, 1961. He rushed 65 times for 299 yards and three touchdowns for the Warriors during the 1961 season.

Jones was signed by the Buffalo Bills of the American Football League on June 13, 1962. He was released on September 4 but re-signed on October 5, 1962. He played in ten games for the Bills during the 1962 season, rushing four times for 17 yards while also returning 14 kicks for 287 yards.

Jones returned to the Warriors in 1963, scoring three rushing touchdowns and one receiving touchdown. He re-signed with Indianapolis on August 3, 1964. He scored two rushing touchdowns and one receiving touchdown during the 1964 season.

== Personal life ==
Jones died on September 9, 2016, in Indianapolis, Indiana.
