= Abel Herrero =

American politician (born 1969)

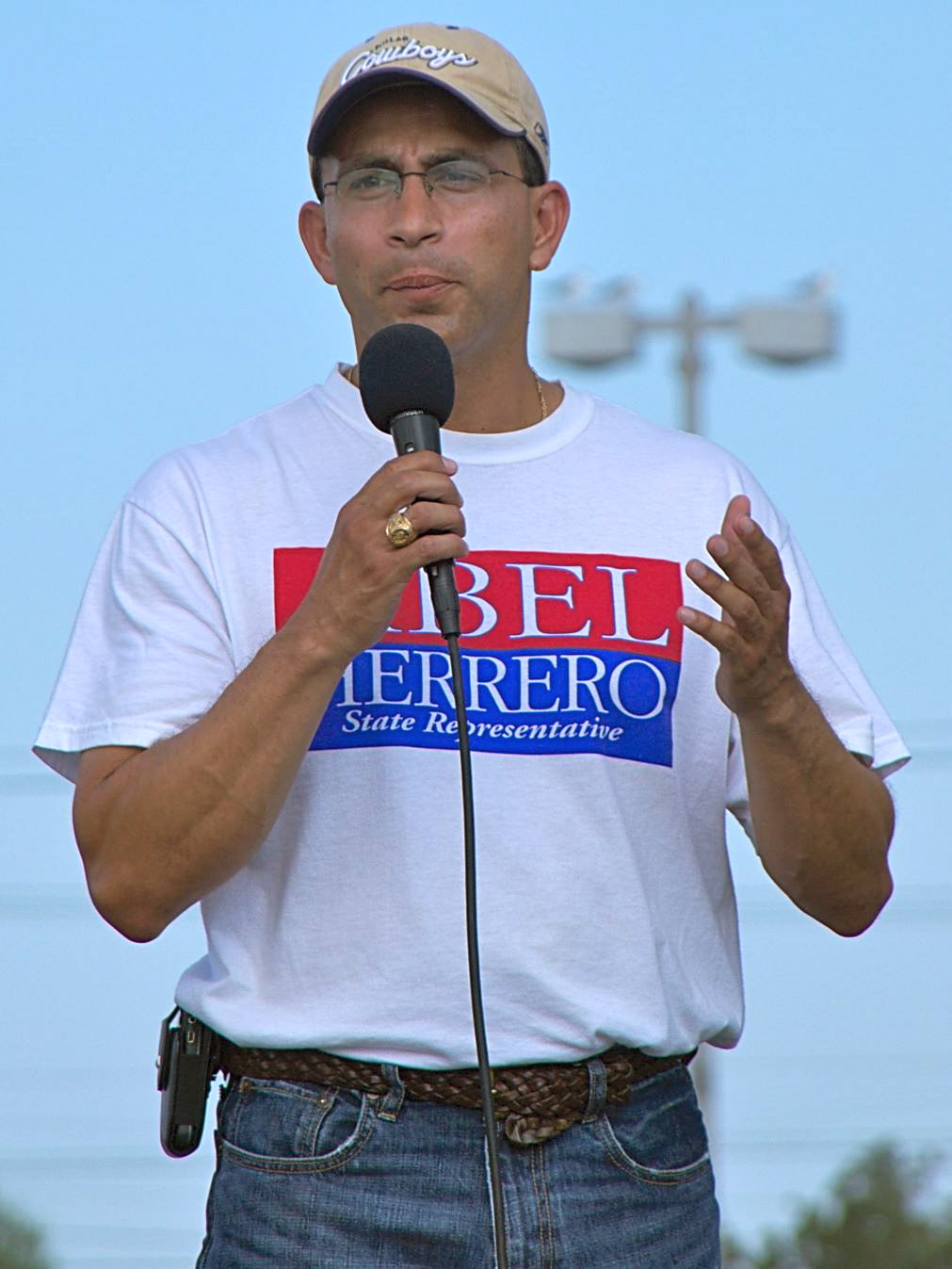
- Herrero in 2010

Member of the Texas House of Representatives from the 34th district
- In office January 8, 2013 – January 14, 2025
- Preceded by: Connie Scott
- Succeeded by: Denise Villalobos
- In office January 11, 2005 – January 11, 2011
- Preceded by: Jaime Capelo
- Succeeded by: Connie Scott

Personal details
- Born: October 29, 1969 (age 56) Robstown, Texas, U.S.
- Party: Democratic
- Spouse: Matilda Herrero
- Children: 5
- Education: Texas A&M University (BA); University of Texas School of Law (JD)
- Occupation: Lawyer

Abel Herrero (born October 29, 1969) is an American politician and lawyer who represented the 34th district in the Texas House of Representatives from 2005 to 2011 and from 2013 to 2025. He is a member of the Democratic Party.

== Background ==
A graduate of Robstown High School, Herrero was a member of the Robstown City Council from 1999 to 2003. He received a B.A. in political science from Texas A&M University in 1993, and a J.D. from the University of Texas in 1997. Herrero has been married to his wife, Matilda, since 1993; they have five children.

== Election history ==
Herrero represented District 34 of the Texas House of Representatives from 2013 to 2025. Herrero previously served as the representative for District 34 from 2005 to 2011, but was defeated in the 2010 election by Republican Connie Scott. In that election, Scott polled 13,892 (54 percent) to Herrero's 11,855 (46 percent). In November 2012, however, Herrero unseated Scott to regain the position.

Herrero was reelected to his seventh nonconsecutive term in the state House in the general election held on November 6, 2018. With 25,193 votes (61 percent), he defeated the Republican candidate, Chris Hale, who polled 16,045 (38.9 percent).

== Legislative history ==
Herrero served as the chairman of the House Committee on Criminal Jurisprudence. During his time in the House, Herrero was the Vice-Chairman of the Health and Human Services Committee, and the chairman of the Integrated Eligibility and TIERS Subcommittee. He also served on the served on the Appropriations Committee, Agriculture and Livestock Committee, Redistricting Committee, and the Defense Affairs and State-Federal Relations committees.

Texas House of Representatives
Preceded by Connie Scott	Texas State Representative for District 34 (Nueces County); 2013–2025	Succeeded by Denise Villalobos
Preceded by Jaime Capelo	Texas State Representative for District 34 (Nueces County); 2005–2011	Succeeded by Connie Scott
