= Robstown High School =

Coordinates: 27°48′3.4″N 97°40′35.1″W

Robstown Early College High School

Location
- 609 Highway 44; Robstown, Texas 78380; United States

Information
- School type: Public high school
- School district: Robstown Independent School District
- Principal: Maribel Trevino
- Staff: 50.85 (FTE)
- Grades: 9-12
- Enrollment: 736 (2023–2024)
- Student to teacher ratio: 14.47
- Colors: Red & White
- Athletics conference: UIL, AAA
- Mascot: Cotton Picker
- Website: Robstown High School webpage

Robstown High School is an AAAA secondary school located in the Corpus Christi suburb-city of Robstown, Texas. The school handles grades 9 through 12. RECHS primarily serves the city, yet it enrolls students from nearby school districts such as Banquete, Calallen, Tuloso-Midway, and the census-designated community of North San Pedro. Robstown Early College High School has neighborhood and Advanced Placement programs.

== Vocational programs ==
Robstown Early College High School is noted for having vocational-technical programs offering courses such as cosmetology, health care professions, woodshop, and drafting.

== Athletics ==
The school’s athletics teams, known as the Robstown Cottonpickers, compete in baseball, football, cross country, track, volleyball, basketball, powerlifting, tennis, & softball.

=== State titles ===
- Baseball -
  - 1991(4A), 1992(4A)

Football

== 1966 District Champs ==
- 2010 Bi-District Champs - Playoff Win

== Notable alumni ==
- Eddie Jackson, American bassist from Queensrÿche
- Roland Gutierrez, American keyboardist and music producer
- Solomon P. Ortiz, Congressman - Texas's 27th congressional district)
- Gene Upshaw, NFL player - Oakland Raiders
- Marvin Upshaw, NFL player - Cleveland Browns, Kansas City Chiefs and St. Louis Cardinals
- Abel Herrero, Texas State Representative

== Controversy ==
The Robstown Cotton Pickers name has come with some controversy over the years. The name is in reference to Hispanic migrant workers, whose presence and activity have been a noticeable influence on the city’s culture. After influencers such as Kai Cenat visited the school and posted about it on their YouTube channels, it subsequently became a topic of discussion on TikTok and other platforms due to the name, which was construed by some to be racist. The Robstown community continues to show pride in the name although there is an abundance of controversy in the subject.
