= Roland Gutierrez (musician) =

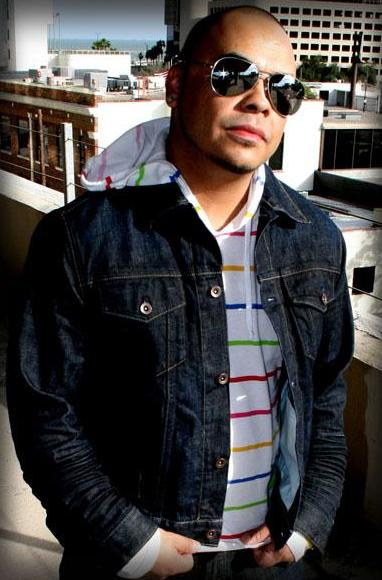

Background information
- Birth name: Rolando Gutierrez
- Also known as: Beatzilla-X
- Born: April 29, 1975 (age 49); Corpus Christi, Texas
- Origin: Robstown, Texas
- Genres: Hip Hop, Reggae, Tejano, Cumbia
- Occupation(s): Rapper, Record Producer, Songwriter
- Instrument(s): Keyboardist, Singer
- Years active: 1992 - present

Rolando Gutierrez (born April 29, 1975) is an American musician best known as a keyboardist and music producer with credits from DJ Kane, Jennifer Peña, Chris Pérez Band, Thalía, [Cristian Castro] and Verónica Castro just to name a few with two of his productions earning Latin Grammy nominations.

== Career ==
Gutierrez began playing piano at the age of 15 and was no stranger to music as his older brother Robert was part of the powerhouse tejano band Grupo Estrella. By age 18 he was contributing to albums with A.B. Quintanilla III for artists like Selena, Escalofrio, Los Agues, Imagen Latina, Oxygeno and as part of the group Chikko. Gutierrez continued as a session musician and toured for acts like Jennifer y Los Jetz, DJ Kane, La Conquista, Frankie J, Paula DeAnda, Elida Reyna y Avante, and joined the power house group Mi Stereo where he continues to tour in the United States, Mexico, South and Central America.

== Album credits ==
- 1993 Xplosivo [Ven A Bailar Conmigo]: Keyboards, Vocals
- 1995 Chikko [Self Titled]: Arranger, Keyboards, Programming
- 1995 Oxygeno [Mas Alla De Todo]: Keyboards
- 1996 Selena [No Quiero Saber]: Keyboards, Programming, Sequencing
- 1996 Los Agues [Perdoname]: Keyboards
- 1996 Escalofrio [Quien Dime Quien]: Arranger, Keyboards, Producer
- 1996 Cristian Castro [El Deseo De Oir Tu Voz]: Arranger, Keyboards
- 1996 Various Artists [Voces Unidas]: Keyboards
- 1996 Thalía [Todo Es Possible] (Single): Keyboards
- 1997 Jackie Y Romántico [Siempre Tu Eres]: Keyboards, Arranger, Producer
- 1997 Jennifer Y Los Jetz [Self Titled]: Keyboards, Producer
- 1997 Various Artists [Tejano Classics "Hacienda"]: Percussion, Arranger, Keyboards, Vocals
- 1997 Verónica Castro [Tocada]: Arranger, Keyboards, Programming
- 1998 Jennifer Y Los Jetz [Mariposa]: Accordion, Keyboards
- 2001 Victoria Y Sus Chikos [Preparate]: Producer, Arranger, Programming
- 2001 Alma [Self Titled]: Producer, Keyboards
- 2002: Chris Perez Band [Una Noche Mas]: Vocals, Arranger
- 2003 Victoria Y Sus Chikos [Cada Dia Que Pasa]: Arranger, Producer, Engineer, Mastering, Mixing
- 2003 Michelle [Luz de Mi Vida]: Accordion, Keyboards, Producer
- 2003 Happy [LIVE]: Keyboards
- 2005 Ricky Naranjo Y Los Gamblers [V]: Percussion
- 2005 DJ Kane [Capitulo II-Brinca]: Keyboards, Arranger, Producer
- 2008 SouthCoast [The Name Remains the Same]: Producer, Arranger, Engineer, Mixing, Programming, Vocals
- 2009 Hilda Lamas [Latina Soul]: Keyboards, Producer, Vocals
- 2015 Mannie B [Solo Album]: Keyboards, Producer
- 2021 Hilda Lamas [Te Voy Amar]: Background Vocals, Songwriter
- 2022 La Conquitsa Producer, Dime Que Si, El Party Bus, Mi Quince, Ya Me Voy,
- 2024 Mexicana and The Monster Squad- Producer/Keyboards/Vocals
- 2024 Mi Stereo- Welcome To Mi Stereo- Producer, Keyboards, Vocals
- 2024 M-Dos- Producer
- My Life of Kylie- E Entertainment Music Sountracks for 3 episodes

== Live performances ==
- Los Arias (1992)
- Xplosivo (1993)
- Chikko (1994–1995)
- Jennifer Peña Y Los Jetz (1995–1999)
- Guyz of Destiny (1999–2000)
- La Sombra de Tony Guerrero (1999)
- SouthCoast (2000)
- Chris Pérez Band (2000–2002)
- Ralo's Taxi (2003–2004)
- Paula DeAnda (2006, 2007)
- Baby Bash (2006)
- DJ Kane (2003–2007)
- Mannie B (2008)
- Frankie J (2008)
- The RoRo & SouthCoast Project (2008)
- Nemesis (2009)
- Elida Reyna (2009)
- Big Sexy (2007)
- La Conquista (2009–2012)
- Mexicana and The Monster Squad (2014)
- Mi Stereo (2014-2020)
