= Denise Villalobos =

American politician

Member of the Texas House of Representatives from the 34th district
- Incumbent
- Assumed office January 14, 2025
- Preceded by: Abel Herrero

Personal details
- Born: Corpus Christi, Texas, U.S.
- Party: Republican
- Spouse: Ruben
- Education: Texas A&M University–Kingsville (BA); Texas Tech University (MS)
- Website: Campaign website

Denise Villalobos is an American engineer and politician serving as a member of the Texas House of Representatives for the 34th district since 2025. A member of the Republican Party, she was elected in 2024 flipping the seat held by retiring incumbent Democrat Abel Herrero.

== Early life and career ==
Villalobos was born in Corpus Christi, Texas. She earned a bachelor’s degree in chemical engineering from Texas A&M University–Kingsville & a master’s degree in business from Texas Tech University.

Villalobos worked as a project manager at Koch, Inc.-owned Flint Hills Resources, tasked with building oil pipelines & terminals. In 2022, she was elected to the Tuloso-Midway Independent School District Board of Trustees for Place 6, defeating incumbent John Samaniego in a landslide with 70.6% of the vote.

== Texas House of Representatives ==
In 2024, Villalobos ran for the Texas House of Representatives in the 34th district where incumbent Democrat Abel Herrero was retiring. She was unopposed in the Republican primary and faced Democrat Solomon Ortiz Jr., who previously served as a state representative from 2006 to 2011, in the general election. On her website, Villalobos pleged to "fight for increased funding for our teachers and local schools" and did not emphasize her pro-school voucher views; the American Federation for Children Growth Fund’s political action committee further paid for attack ads against Ortiz. She held a financial advantage over Ortiz and outraised him 4–1 in October. On election night, she defeated him with 55% of the vote and flipped the seat, with the Austin American-Statesman calling Ortiz's defeat "among the most stinging for Democrats."

=== Tenure ===
In 2025, Villalobos testified in support of a bill which would direct the Nueces County Hospital District to administer a grant program to recruit physicians and decrease patient wait times, which a study showed were higher than the national average— the bill was not supported by the hospital district due to language which would divert funds from its mission of indigent care. Villalobos stated an amended version would be introduced to solve this concern however the bill never made it through the legislative process.

== Personal life ==
Villalobos and her husband, Ruben, are foster parents who adopted their child.
