= Gene Upshaw =

American football player and labor leader (1945–2008)

- Upshaw during his time with the Oakland Raiders

No. 63
- Position: Guard

Personal information
- Born: August 15, 1945; Robstown, Texas, U.S.
- Died: August 20, 2008 (aged 63); Lake Tahoe, California, U.S.
- Listed height: 6 ft 5 in (1.96 m)
- Listed weight: 255 lb (116 kg)

Career information
- High school: Robstown
- College: Texas A&I (1963–1966)
- NFL draft: 1967: 1st round, 17th overall pick

Career history
- Oakland Raiders (1967–1981)

Awards and highlights
- 2× Super Bowl champion (XI, XV); AFL champion (1967); 3× first-team All-Pro (1970, 1974, 1977); 2× first-team All-AFL (1968, 1969); 5× second-team All-Pro (1971–1973, 1975, 1976); Second-team All-AFL (1967); 6× Pro Bowl (1972–1977); AFL All-Star (1968); NFL 1970s All-Decade Team; NFL 75th Anniversary All-Time Team; NFL 100th Anniversary All-Time Team; NFL record: Most consecutive starts to begin a career, including playoffs: 231 (Note: 207 regular season; 24 playoffs)

Career AFL/NFL statistics
- Games played: 217
- Games started: 207
- Fumble recoveries: 5
- Stats at Pro Football Reference
- Pro Football Hall of Fame

Eugene Thurman Upshaw Jr. (August 15, 1945 – August 20, 2008) was an American professional football guard who played for the Oakland Raiders of the American Football League (AFL) and later the National Football League (NFL). He later served as the executive director of the National Football League Players Association (NFLPA). Upshaw was inducted into the Pro Football Hall of Fame in 1987 and is also the only player in NFL history to reach the Super Bowl with the same team in three different decades.

== Early life ==
Upshaw was born in Robstown, Texas, and graduated from Robstown High School. He played college football at NAIA program Texas A&I University (now known as Texas A&M University–Kingsville). He was a member of Alpha Phi Alpha fraternity. In 1967 at age 22, Upshaw married Jimmye Lee Hill-Upshaw (née Hill). Together they had one son, Eugene Upshaw III, and later divorced.

== Professional career ==
Upshaw was selected in the first round with the 17th overall pick in the 1967 NFL/AFL Draft.

After playing football in college at a number of offensive line positions, he settled at left offensive guard for the Oakland Raiders in the American Football League and the National Football League for 15 years. During that time, he played in three Super Bowls; in the 1967, 1976, and 1980 seasons, making him the first player to reach the game in three different decades (Jerry Rice and Bill Romanowski would later accomplish the feat in 2002, while Tom Brady later accomplished the feat in 2020). He also played in three AFL Championship Games, seven American Football Conference title games, one AFL All-Star game, and six NFL Pro Bowls. He was selected by The Sporting News to the 1969 AFL All League team.

He was part of a particularly strong offensive line during the 1976 season, with interior linemates Dave Dalby at center and George Buehler at right guard. In the 1976 AFC championship game of the 1976–77 NFL playoffs, the Raiders beat the Pittsburgh Steelers, rushing for 157 yards and passing for 88 yards. The Raiders then beat the Minnesota Vikings in Super Bowl XI, rushing for a whopping 266 yards and passing for 180 yards, as Upshaw overwhelmed the opposing defensive tackle, Alan Page, a Hall-of-Famer. In the 1980 AFC championship game of the 1980–81 NFL playoffs, the Raiders beat the San Diego Chargers, rushing for 138 yards and passing for 261 yards. The Raiders then beat the Philadelphia Eagles in Super Bowl XV, rushing for 117 yards and passing for 261 yards again, as Upshaw, Dalby, and right guard Mickey Marvin outmatched Eagle nose tackle Charlie Johnson and inside linebackers Bill Bergey and Frank LeMaster.

In 1999, he was ranked No. 62 on The Sporting News' list of the 100 Greatest Football Players.

He was the older brother of Marvin Upshaw, who was a defensive lineman with the Cleveland Browns, Kansas City Chiefs and St. Louis Cardinals.

Over the course of his sixteen seasons in the NFL, Upshaw witnessed—and, in many cases, participated in—many iconic NFL games and plays. These include the Heidi Game, the Immaculate Reception, The Sea of Hands Game, Ghost to the Post, the Holy Roller Game, and Red Right 88. He also reached three Super Bowls in three different decades (1967, 1976, and 1980); in total, Upshaw played in 24 playoff games with the Raiders.

== NFLPA career ==
Upshaw was an active member of the bargaining committee for the National Football League Players' Association (NFLPA) throughout the late 1970s and early 1980s. He led the NFLPA in its unsuccessful strike in 1987 and through years of antitrust litigation against the league, including a brief period in which the NFLPA became a professional association rather than a union, that ended with the union's acceptance of a salary cap in return for free agency and an enhanced share of league revenues for the union's members. Until his death, he was the executive director of the association.

In an infamous 1987 incident during labor negotiations between the NFL and the NFLPA, Dallas Cowboys president and general manager Tex Schramm told Upshaw, "Gene, here's what you have to understand: we're the ranchers and you're the cattle, and we can always get more cattle."

He alienated many retired players after comments he made in response to 325 former AFL and NFL players receiving minimal retirement benefits. When the former players attempted to have the NFL and the NFLPA consider their plight, Upshaw responded: "The bottom line is I don't work for them. They don't hire me and they can't fire me. They can complain about me all day long. They can have their opinion. But the active players have the vote." Upshaw later said he was misquoted and was speaking solely about fellow Hall of Famer Joe DeLamielleure, further saying "A guy like DeLamielleure says the things he said about me; you think I'm going to invite him to dinner? No. I'm going to break his damn neck." While Upshaw's comments were true on the letter of the NFL's benefit rules—the NFLPA is charged with the union rights of active players, and any matters dealing with retirees are subject to negotiations between the NFLPA and the NFL Management Council—they were badly received by both former and current players, fans, and the media. Prior to his death, a campaign was allegedly being led by Ravens kicker Matt Stover to oust Gene Upshaw as head of the NFLPA; however, all parties have denied such a plan. Stover along with a number of other players claim to have only been seeking a definite succession plan in order to avoid a drawn-out and messy transfer of power such as Upshaw's death has seen realized. Tennessee Titans center Kevin Mawae, president of the NFLPA, issued a statement saying that Stover's opinion did not reflect the opinion of the board of player representatives.

== Halls of Fame and other honors ==
Upshaw was inducted into the Pro Football Hall of Fame in 1987. And in 1996, Upshaw was also inducted into the Bay Area Sports Hall of Fame.

In 2004, the NCAA Division II sports information directors awarded the first Gene Upshaw Division II Lineman of the Year award. It is presented each year during the weekend of the NCAA Division II Football Championship by the Manheim (Pennsylvania) Touchdown Club.

== Death ==
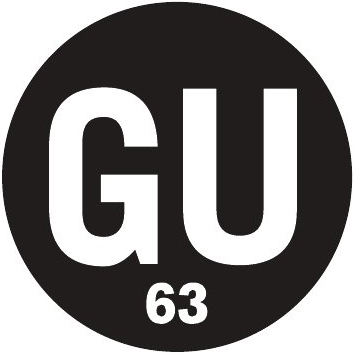

In mid-August 2008 at his home in Lake Tahoe, Upshaw began to feel ill. His wife Terri (née Buich) noticed that his breathing was labored, so she convinced him to go to the emergency room, where he was diagnosed with pancreatic cancer on August 17. On August 20, Upshaw died with Terri and his sons Eugene III, Justin, and Daniel by his side, five days after his 63rd birthday. The Cancer Center at the hospital in Truckee, California where he died was named in his memory.

After his death, the NFL announced that all 32 teams would wear a patch on their jerseys with the initials "GU" and the number 63 for the opening weekend of the 2008 season. Beginning in the second week of the season, all teams wore the patch as a decal on their backs of their helmets instead of a shoulder patch; while the Raiders continued to wear the shoulder patch throughout the season.

In 2011, his son Eugene Upshaw III filed a lawsuit in Fairfax County Circuit Court regarding how the will was handled at the time of his father's death, stating his father was too ill to be able to understand the document he was signing. The case was settled out of court prior to the trial, but the facts of the case created more conflict between retired players and the NFLPA, with several prominent retired players/advocates lashing out at Upshaw and his family for a $15 million payment in his will and citing the large number of disabled and broke veterans who had no resources; however, the reporting also showed that the $15 million was a deferred payment from Upshaw's long tenure as the NFLPA head and the money was taken out of his salary during that time and served as a de facto pension separate from the issues that were causing controversy.

== See also ==
- List of American Football League players
- List of most consecutive starts and games played by NFL players
