= Texas's 34th House of Representatives district =

American legislative district

Texas's 34th State House of Representatives district
Representative
Denise Villalobos; R
- Demographics: 20.2% White; 4.6% Black; 74.0% Hispanic; 1.2% Asian
- Population (2020) • Voting age: 189,560; 143,094

The 34th district of the Texas House of Representatives consists of a portion of Nueces County. The current representative is Denise Villalobos, who has represented the district since 2025.

== Members ==
- Abel Herrero
- Denise Villalobos
