= Jeff Feagles =

American football player (born 1966)

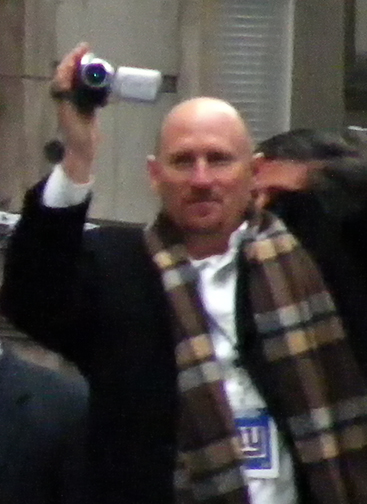
- Feagles in 2008

No. 6, 5, 10, 17, 18
- Position: Punter

Personal information
- Born: March 7, 1966 (age 60); Anaheim, California, U.S.
- Listed height: 6 ft 1 in (1.85 m)
- Listed weight: 215 lb (98 kg)

Career information
- High school: Gerard Catholic (Phoenix, Arizona)
- College: Miami (FL) (1985–1987)
- NFL draft: 1988: undrafted

Career history
- New England Patriots (1988–1989); Philadelphia Eagles (1990–1993); Arizona Cardinals (1994–1997); Seattle Seahawks (1998–2002); New York Giants (2003–2009)

Awards and highlights
- Super Bowl champion (XLII); 2× Pro Bowl (1995, 2008); PFWA All-Rookie Team (1988); National champion (1987); NFL records: Most consecutive games played: 352; Most career punt yards: 71,211; Most career punts: 1,713; Most career punts inside the 20: 554

Career NFL statistics
- Punts: 1,713
- Punt yards: 71,211
- Average punt: 41.6
- Longest punt: 74
- Stats at Pro Football Reference

Jeffrey Allan Feagles (born March 7, 1966) is an American former professional football player who was a punter for 22 seasons in the National Football League (NFL). He played college football for the Miami Hurricanes. He was originally signed by the New England Patriots as an undrafted free agent in 1988, and retired in 2010 after last playing for the New York Giants.

Feagles is known for using the "coffin corner" punt. He earned Pro Bowl selections in 1995 and 2008 and won a Super Bowl ring with the Giants in Super Bowl XLII. In his 22-season career, Feagles never missed a game, a record amongst special teams players.

== College career ==
Feagles attended Gerard High School in Phoenix, Arizona and was a letterman in football, basketball, and baseball. Following a single season at Scottsdale Community College, Feagles played college football at the University of Miami. He joined the Pi Kappa Alpha fraternity during his time as an undergraduate. He won a national championship with Miami's 1987 team. Feagles was inducted into the University of Miami Sports Hall of Fame at its 40th Annual Banquet on Wednesday, February 13, 2008, at Miami's Jungle Island.

== Professional career ==
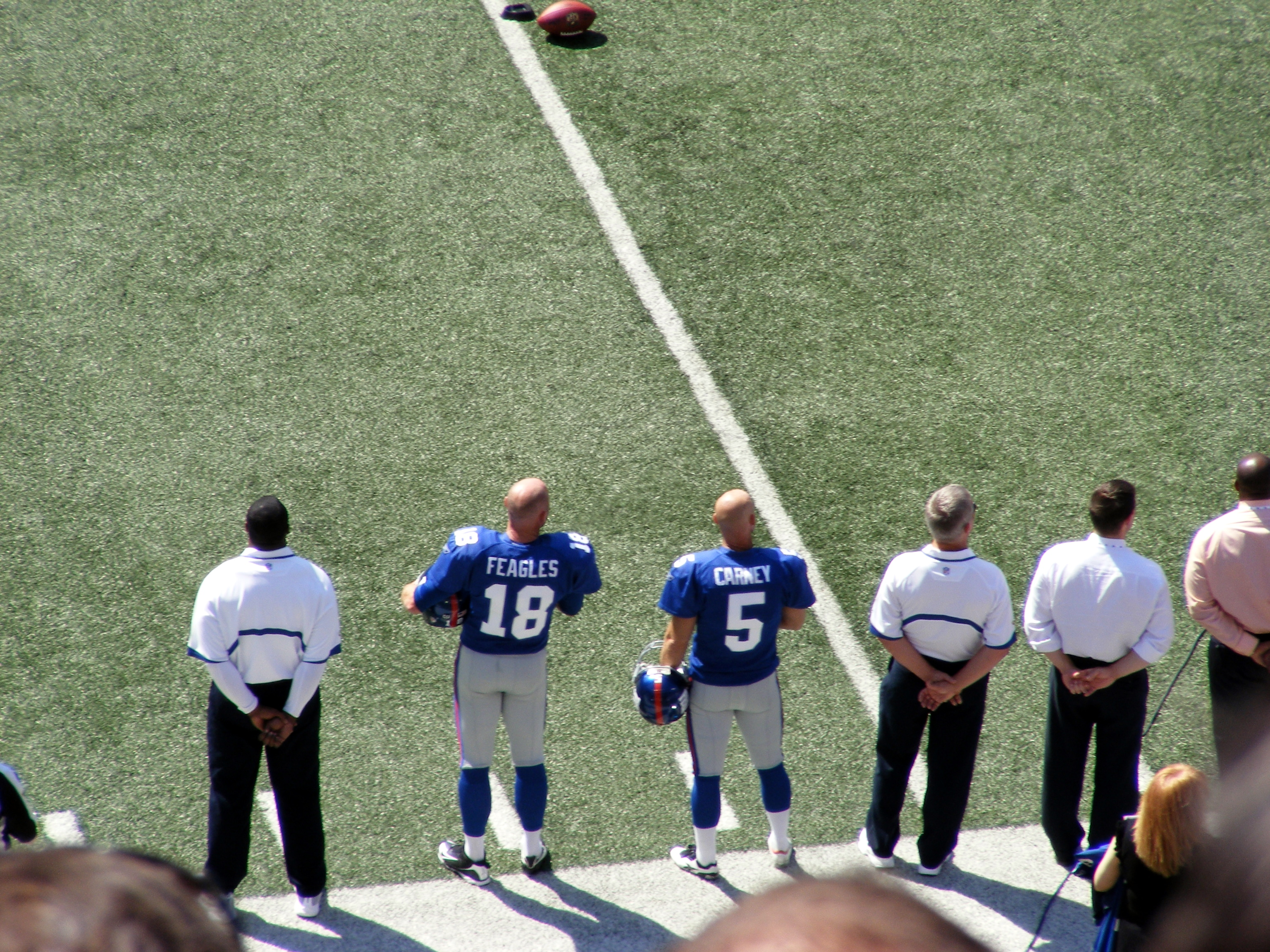
Feagles with John Carney in 2008; in their 40s, both were kickers for the New York Giants.

In the summer of 2004, during Feagles' second season with the New York Giants, he offered newly drafted quarterback Eli Manning his #10, which was the same number that Manning wore in college. In exchange, Feagles and his family received an all-expenses-paid vacation to Florida paid for by Manning. He switched to 17 until wide receiver Plaxico Burress wanted the number; Feagles sold the number to him in exchange for a new kitchen in his house.

2007 marked Feagles' 20th NFL season. Prior to his affiliation with the New York Giants, he played for the New England Patriots, the Philadelphia Eagles, the Arizona Cardinals and the Seattle Seahawks.

He was a member of the New York Giants in their Super Bowl XLII win over the New England Patriots on February 3, 2008, the first, and only Super Bowl of his 20-year career. At 41 years, 10 months, 26 days of age, he was the oldest player to have played in a Super Bowl, until the Colts' Matt Stover broke the record in 2010.

Feagles earned his second career selection to the Pro Bowl in 2008.

On April 30, 2010, after the Giants opened mini-camp, Feagles announced his retirement. Giants head coach Tom Coughlin said about the retirement, "He is 44 years old. He worked very hard for approximately a month right after the season just to try to tell himself again that he could do this and wanted to be able to do it. And then ran into some -- as we went on and started the offseason program -- ran into some of the physical tests that you have to go through as you continue to advance almost on a weekly basis. He has a program which is unique to himself, but he is having some physical issues. And so he has decided to deal with them."

Feagles played 22 seasons and played in every single game, 352 games overall. Feagles holds the NFL record for most consecutive games played in a career. Feagles, as of 2020, is 4th all-time in most games played in NFL history; only Morten Andersen, Adam Vinatieri, and Gary Anderson have played in more games than he. Due to his appearance in his final career game on January 3, 2010 (against the Minnesota Vikings), Feagles became the second-ever professional football player (behind George Blanda) to have played in four different decades. Feagles' former teammate John Carney joined him in the four-decade club in the 2010 NFL season.

== NFL career statistics ==
Legend
	Won the Super Bowl
	Led the league
	NFL record
**Bold**	Career high

Regular season

Season	Team	GP	Punting					
Season	Team	GP	Punts	Yards	Y/P	Net	In20	TB
1988	NE	16	91	3,482	38.3	34.1	24	8
1989	NE	16	63	2,392	38.0	31.3	13	2
1990	PHI	16	72	3,026	42.0	35.5	20	3
1991	PHI	16	87	3,640	41.8	34.0	29	11
1992	PHI	16	82	3,459	42.2	36.9	26	7
1993	PHI	16	83	3,323	40.0	35.3	31	4
1994	ARI	16	**98**	3,997	40.8	36.0	33	10
1995	ARI	16	72	3,150	43.8	38.2	20	8
1996	ARI	16	76	3,328	43.8	36.4	23	6
1997	ARI	16	91	**4,028**	**44.3**	36.8	24	10
1998	SEA	16	81	3,568	44.0	36.5	27	12
1999	SEA	16	84	3,425	40.8	35.2	34	5
2000	SEA	16	74	2,960	40.0	36.9	24	2
2001	SEA	16	85	3,730	43.9	36.4	26	7
2002	SEA	16	61	2,542	41.7	37.0	22	4
2003	NYG	16	90	3,641	40.5	33.9	31	6
2004	NYG	16	74	3,069	41.5	34.6	23	4
2005	NYG	16	73	3,070	42.1	37.0	26	3
2006	NYG	16	77	3,098	40.2	37.0	27	3
2007	NYG	16	71	2,865	40.4	36.0	25	5
2008	NYG	16	64	2,814	44.0	40.2	23	5
2009	NYG	16	64	2,604	40.7	36.0	23	2
Career		352	1,713	71,211	41.6	35.9	554	127

=== NFL records ===
On November 27, 2005, Feagles broke the NFL record for consecutive games played, with 283. The record was previously held by Minnesota Vikings defensive end Jim Marshall who played from 1960 to 1979. His record stands at 352.

Feagles holds the following NFL records:

- Most consecutive games played, career: 352
- Most punts, career: 1,713
- Most punts inside the 20, career: 497
- Most punting yards, career: 71,211

== Personal life ==
Feagles is married to Michelle. They have four sons: Christopher (nicknamed C.J.), Blake, Trevor, and Zachary. Christopher was a punter for the University of North Carolina at Chapel Hill football team and played in the US Army high-school All-American game in 2008. Blake played wide receiver for UConn in 2013 and 2014. Zach was a punter at Rutgers University and the University of Miami. Trevor did not pursue collegiate football, but currently attends Loyola University Maryland.

Feagles currently resides in Ridgewood, New Jersey where he is a residential and commercial real estate agent for Keller Williams. He is also a member of the New York Giants Broadcast Team responsible for pre- and post-game radio content along with analysis on the Fox Giants Post Game Live show.

Upon his retirement, Feagles was the 2nd to last active player behind John Carney to appear in the classic NES video game, Tecmo Super Bowl.

== See also ==
- Iron man
