= Jason Witten =

American football player and coach (born 1982)

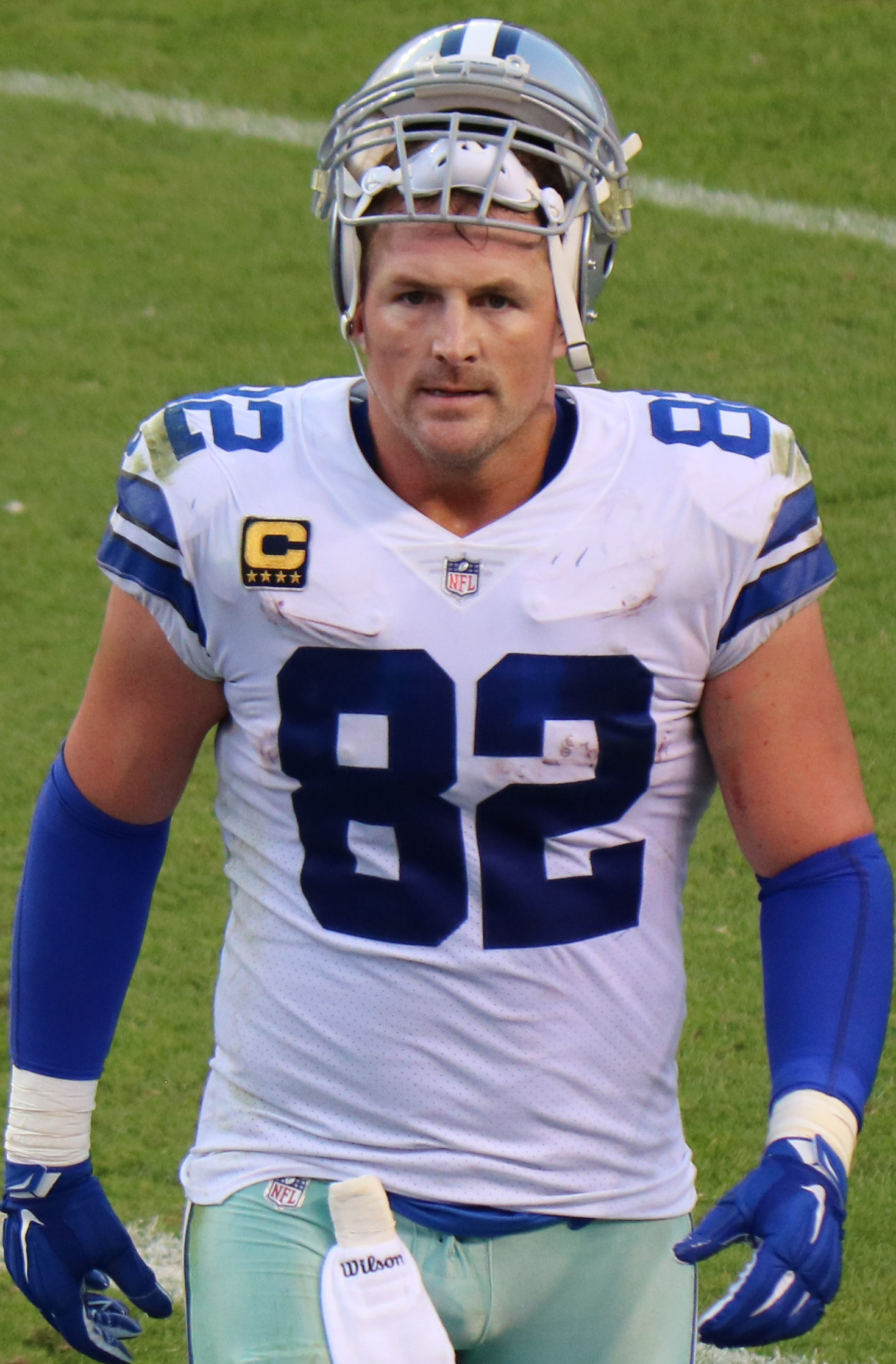
- Witten with the Dallas Cowboys in 2017

Oklahoma Sooners
- Title: Offensive coordinator

Personal information
- Born: May 6, 1982 (age 44); Washington, D.C., U.S.
- Listed height: 6 ft 6 in (1.98 m)
- Listed weight: 263 lb (119 kg)

Career information
- Position: Tight end (No. 82)
- High school: Elizabethton (Elizabethton, Tennessee)
- College: Tennessee (2000–2002)
- NFL draft: 2003: 3rd round, 69th overall pick

Career history

Playing
- Dallas Cowboys (2003–2017, 2019); Las Vegas Raiders (2020)

Coaching
- Liberty Christian (TX) (2021–2025) Head coach; Oklahoma (2026–present); Tight ends coach (2026); Interim offensive coordinator (2026–present)

Awards and highlights
- 2× First-team All-Pro (2007, 2010); 2× Second-team All-Pro (2008, 2012); 11× Pro Bowl (2004–2010, 2012–2014, 2017); Walter Payton NFL Man of the Year (2012); PFWA All-Rookie Team (2003); First-team All-SEC (2002); Texas Sports Hall of Fame (2019)

Career NFL statistics
- Receptions: 1,228
- Receiving yards: 13,046
- Receiving touchdowns: 74
- Stats at Pro Football Reference

Christopher Jason Witten (born May 6, 1982) is an American football coach and former player who is currently the interim offensive coordinator for the Oklahoma Sooners. He played as a tight end in the National Football League (NFL) for 17 seasons, primarily for the Dallas Cowboys. Witten played college football for the Tennessee Volunteers and was selected by the Cowboys in the third round of the 2003 NFL draft. He ranks second in all-time career receptions by an NFL tight end, trailing Tony Gonzalez, and third in career receiving yards among NFL tight ends, behind Tony Gonzalez and Travis Kelce. Known for his toughness and reliability, Witten is widely regarded as one of the greatest tight ends of all time.

Initially retiring in 2018, Witten became a color analyst for ESPN's Monday Night Football. After working as an ESPN color analyst for the 2018 season, he returned to the NFL the following year, reuniting with the Cowboys. Witten then joined the Las Vegas Raiders for the 2020 season. He afterward retired again but signed a one-day contract to retire as a member of the Cowboys.

== Early life ==
Witten has two older brothers, Ryan and Shawn. All were raised in Washington, D.C., but attended Elizabethton High School in Elizabethton, Tennessee. Witten's father, Ed, a 6-foot-8-inch (2.03 m), 300 pounds (140 kg) mailman, became addicted to alcohol and drugs when Witten was six and became abusive toward Witten's mother, Kim, and Witten's older brothers. When Witten was 11, he moved to Elizabethton to live with his grandparents. His grandfather, Dave Rider, was the coach of the football team where Witten was a two-way player, playing linebacker and tight end.

Witten became a three-year starter playing both linebacker and tight end, while helping his team reach the state semi-finals three times. As a senior linebacker, Witten finished the season with 163 tackles (registering a career school record 450), nine sacks, two interceptions, five forced fumbles, three fumble recoveries, and two blocked kicks. That year, he received several accolades: All-American, All-State (also as a junior), USA Today Player of the Year for Tennessee, East Tennessee Player of the Year, Region Defensive Player of the Year and runner-up for the Mr. Football award. Witten had 26 receptions and 14 touchdowns on offense. He also played basketball, averaging 15 points and 12 rebounds per game.

== College career ==
=== 2000 season ===
In 2000, Witten accepted a scholarship to the University of Tennessee, with the promise from head coach Phillip Fulmer that he would be played at defensive end. Witten began his first year playing special teams and also saw time as a second-string defensive end.

After injuries impacted the depth at the tight end position, he was moved to the offensive side midway through the season. Although Witten did not agree with the change and even considered transferring, he eventually came around and was used primarily as a blocker while he learned the position. Witten also started in his first two games. As a freshman, he appeared in 12 games and recorded one reception on the season, which went for 11 yards in a 70–3 blowout victory over Louisiana–Monroe.

=== 2001 season ===
Witten appeared in all 13 games as a sophomore, catching 28 passes for 293 yards and two touchdowns. He scored his first collegiate touchdown in a 35–24 victory over Alabama in their annual rivalry game. Witten had 125 receiving yards and a touchdown in Tennessee's Citrus Bowl victory over Michigan. His performance in the 45–17 victory marked the third most receiving yards in a bowl game in Tennessee history.

=== 2002 season ===
As a junior, Witten had a breakout year, setting school records for a tight end in receptions (39) and receiving yards (493) with five touchdowns, including one of the most memorable receptions in school history, a game-winning touchdown in the sixth overtime against Arkansas. He received All-SEC (SEC) and Academic All-SEC honors after leading the conference's tight ends in receptions and receiving yards. Witten was also a semifinalist for the John Mackey Tight End Award.

Even though Witten decided to enter the NFL draft after his junior season and had played the position in only 20 games, he left ranked third all-time among the school's tight ends with 68 career receptions and fourth all-time with 797 receiving yards.

=== Legacy ===
Following the 2017 college football season, Witten's name was placed on a college football award. The Jason Witten Collegiate Man of the Year award honors a player who shows strong leadership qualities on and off the field.

== Professional career ==
Pre-draft measurables
Height	Weight	Arm length	Hand span	40-yard dash	Vertical jump	Broad jump	Bench press
6 ft 5 3/4 in (1.97 m)	264 lb (120 kg)	32 1/2 in (0.83 m)	9 7/8 in (0.25 m)	4.65 s	31 in (0.79 m)	9 ft 2 in (2.79 m)	25 reps
All values from NFL Combine

=== Dallas Cowboys ===
==== 2003 season ====
Witten was selected by the Dallas Cowboys in the third round (69th overall) of the 2003 NFL draft. He was the fifth tight end selected that year. Although the Cowboys had a first-round grade on Witten, when their turn came in the first and second rounds, they selected cornerback Terrence Newman and Al Johnson based on team needs. Undrafted free agent Tony Romo was another rookie who also arrived in Dallas in 2003 and would go on to become Witten's teammate throughout their careers, as well as his roommate during future team training camps and travel games.

Entering the league as a 20-year-old rookie, one of the youngest players in the NFL, Witten started seven of the 15 games he played in. On September 7, he made his NFL debut in a 27–13 loss to the Atlanta Falcons, recording a 13-yard reception. During Week 5, Witten suffered a fractured jaw against the Arizona Cardinals, after being hit by Ronald McKinnon and Ray Thompson, which required surgery to have three plates inserted to help the healing. Witten only missed one game and continued to play through the injury. Head coach Bill Parcells complimented Witten on his toughness. Witten was named to the NFL All-Rookie Team for the 2003 season.

Witten finished his rookie year with 35 receptions for 347 yards and a touchdown. He made his playoff debut in the Wild Card Round against the Carolina Panthers, recording four receptions for 30 yards during the 29–10 loss.

==== 2004 season ====
Witten had a breakout season in 2004, finishing with 87 receptions for 980 yards and six touchdowns. His 87 receptions led the NFC and were the 11th most in NFL history by a tight end and a Cowboys team record for the position. During Week 7 against the Green Bay Packers, Witten had eight receptions for 112 yards and a touchdown in the 41–20 loss. Three weeks later against the Philadelphia Eagles, he had nine receptions for 133 yards and two touchdowns. Witten was selected to his first Pro Bowl.

==== 2005 season ====
Witten finished sixth in the NFL among tight ends in total receptions and became the first Cowboys tight end to have at least 65 receptions in consecutive seasons. He had 66 receptions for 757 yards and six touchdowns for the 9–7 Cowboys in 2005. As a result of his successful season, Witten was named to his second Pro Bowl.

==== 2006 season ====
At the end of the 2006 season, Witten became just the tenth tight end in NFL history to post three consecutive seasons with at least 60 receptions. He registered 64 receptions for 754 yards and a touchdown while being named to his third Pro Bowl in as many seasons.

On July 22, Witten signed a six-year, $29 million contract extension through 2012. The deal contained $12 million guaranteed, including a $6 million signing bonus and a $6 million option bonus in the second year.

==== 2007 season ====
Witten had a career year in 2007, breaking his own single-season Cowboys tight end record for receptions with 96 and becoming the first franchise tight end to reach 1,000 receiving yards in a season with 1,145 yards. He became the third tight end in NFL history with 96 or more catches. Witten started the season off strong with six receptions for 116 yards and a touchdown in a 45–35 victory over the New York Giants in Week 1. During Week 9 on the road against the Philadelphia Eagles, he made a 53-yard reception after losing his helmet. During Week 14 against the Detroit Lions, Witten's 15 receptions tied an NFL record held by Hall of Famer Kellen Winslow Sr., for most receptions in a game by a tight end in NFL history. In the next game against the Eagles, Witten became the first Dallas tight end ever to gain over 1,000 receiving yards in a season. Witten was also one of the NFL-record 13 Cowboys players selected to the Pro Bowl. He was named as a First-team All-Pro for the 2007 season. Witten was nominated for the 2007 Walter Payton NFL Man of the Year, which was won by Jason Taylor.

The Cowboys made the playoffs with a 13–3 record, winning the NFC East and earning the top seed in the NFC. In the Divisional Round against the New York Giants, he had seven receptions for 81 yards during the 21–17 loss.

==== 2008 season ====
During Week 2, Witten recorded seven receptions for 110 yards in the 41–37 victory over the Philadelphia Eagles. Witten made his 400th NFL reception in the Cowboys' Thanksgiving Day game against the Seattle Seahawks in Week 13 as part of a nine-reception, 115-yard, one-touchdown performance. In the regular-season finale against the Eagles, he completed a 42-yard pass to Terrell Owens for the first pass of his NFL career.

Witten finished the season with 81 receptions for 952 yards and four touchdowns. He was named a starter for the 2008 Pro Bowl.

==== 2009 season ====
Witten recorded his first 100-yard game of the 2009 season in Week 12 against the Oakland Raiders. During the 24–7 victory, he had five receptions for 107 yards. In the next game against the New York Giants, he had 14 receptions for 156 yards during the 31–24 loss. During Week 16 against the Washington Redskins, he had six receptions for 117 yards in the 17–0 shutout victory. Witten recorded another Pro Bowl season, making 94 receptions for 1,030 yards and two touchdowns while starting all 16 games. He was given the NFL Iron Man Award.

The Cowboys finished with an 11–5 record and made the playoffs. In the Wild Card Round against the Philadelphia Eagles, he recorded four receptions for 27 yards during the 34–14 victory. During the Divisional Round against the Minnesota Vikings, Witten had 10 receptions for 98 yards in the 34–3 loss.

==== 2010 season ====
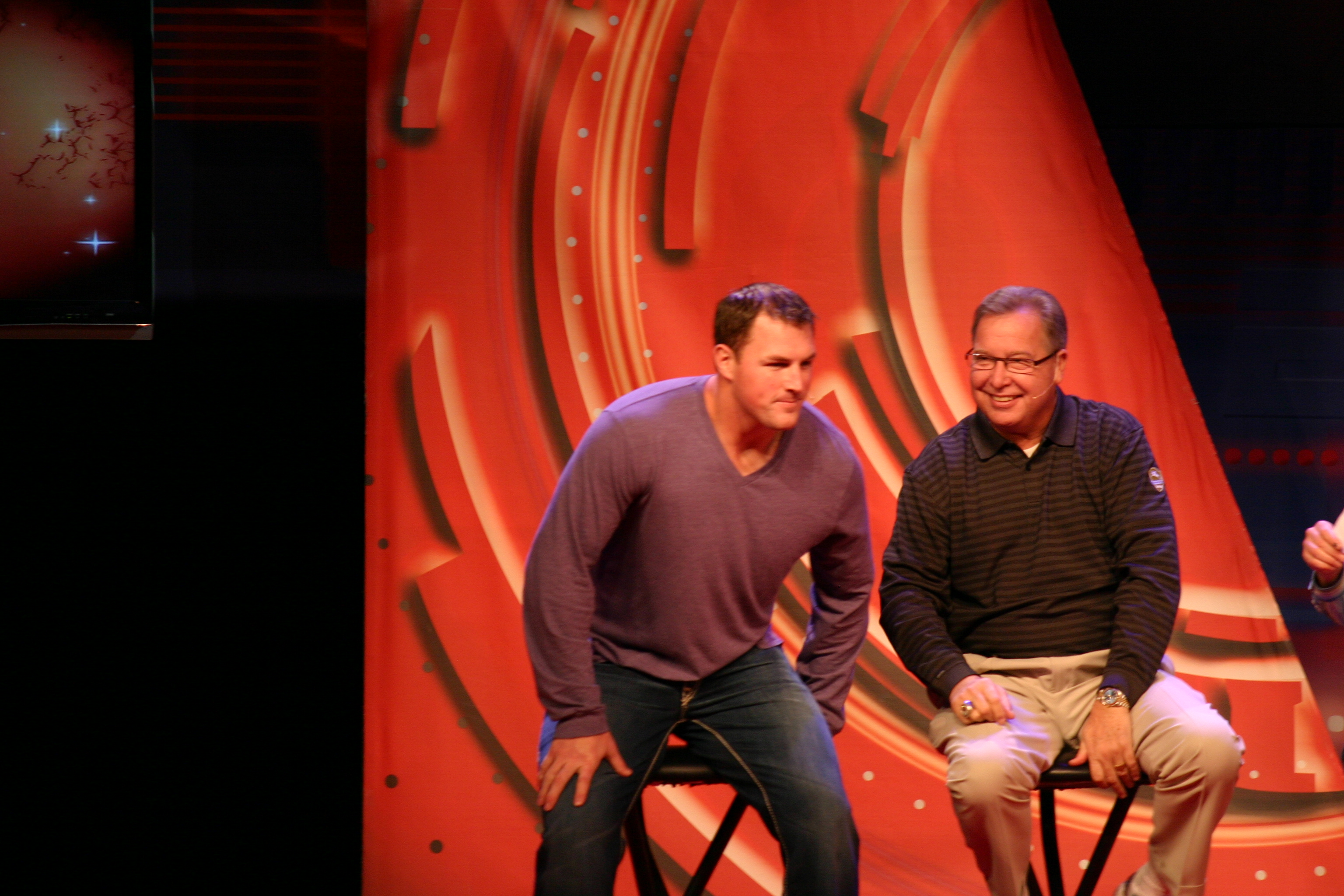
Witten (left) during an interview with ESPN in 2010

Witten banged his head on the turf after making a catch in a Week 2 loss against the Chicago Bears. He was forced to miss the rest of the game with a concussion.

During Week 15 against the Washington Redskins, Witten became the fastest tight end to make 600 receptions (125 games). He accomplished this with a 10-catch, 140-yard, one-touchdown day at home. Witten received his seventh consecutive Pro Bowl selection when he was named as the starting tight end for the NFC.

At the end of the season, Witten was named tight end of the Year by the NFL Alumni Association. Overall, Witten finished the 2010 season with 94 receptions for 1,002 yards and nine touchdowns. He was named as a First-team All-Pro for the second time in his career. Witten was ranked No. 36 by his fellow players on the NFL Top 100 Players of 2011.

==== 2011 season ====
Witten started the 2011 season with consecutive 100-yard receiving games in a loss to the New York Jets and an overtime victory over San Francisco 49ers. During Week 10 against the Buffalo Bills, Witten surpassed Ozzie Newsome to become the tight end with the third most receptions in NFL history with 663.

Witten finished the season with 79 receptions for 942 yards and five touchdowns playing in 16 games and starts. He was ranked 75th by his fellow players on the NFL Top 100 Players of 2012.

==== 2012 season ====
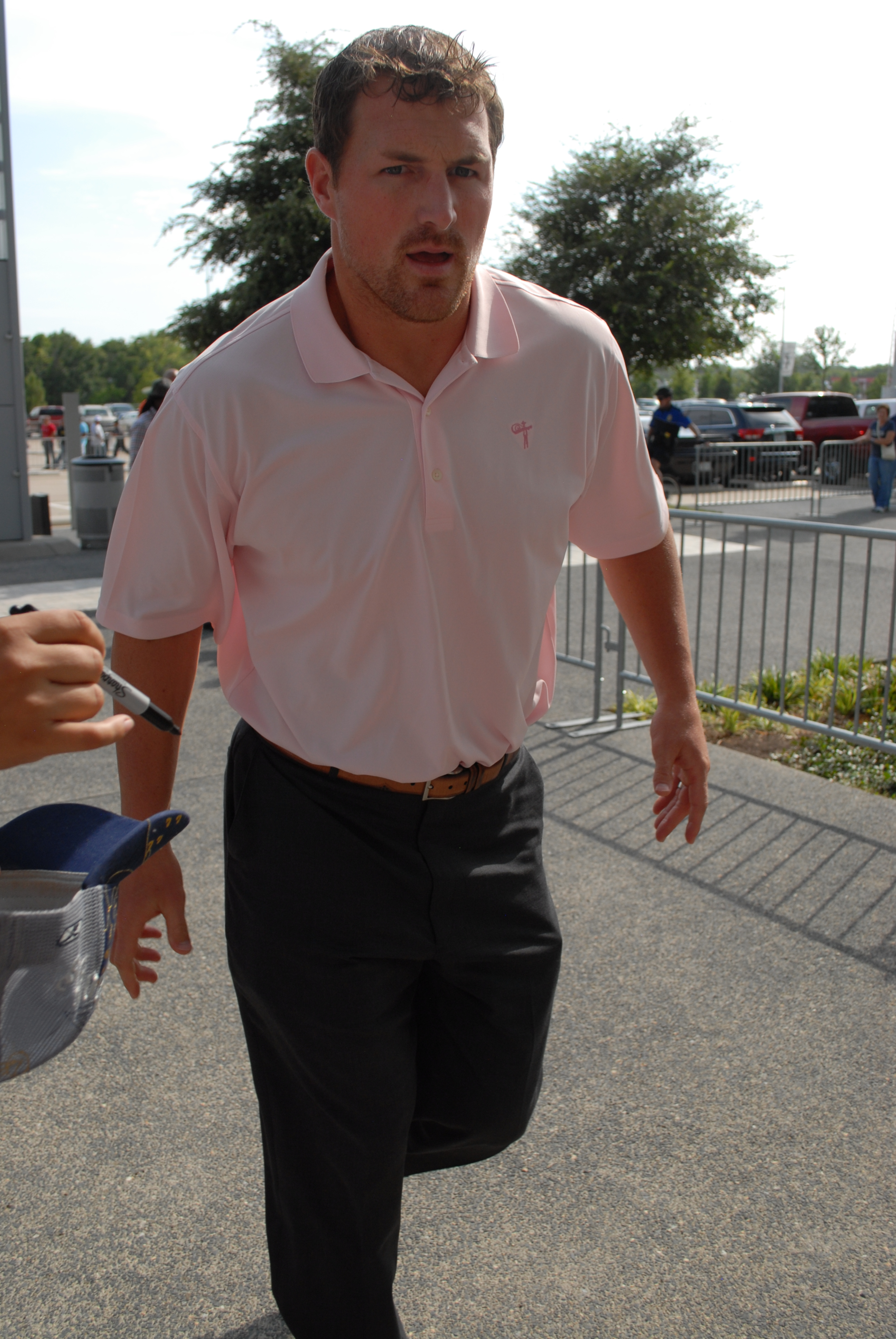
Witten in 2012

On August 13, 2012, Witten suffered a lacerated spleen in the preseason opener against the Oakland Raiders and missed the rest of the preseason. There was talk that the seriousness of the injury could keep him out of action for a considerable time.

On September 5, Witten battled back and was able to play in the season opener, catching two passes for 10 yards in a 24–17 victory over the New York Giants. His availability for the game was in question due to the spleen injury he suffered during the preseason, but Witten was active for the game after being medically cleared to play.

During Week 2 against the Seattle Seahawks, Witten caught four passes for 58 yards. He finished the game with 702 career receptions to become just the second player in franchise history to reach 700 catches and the third tight end in NFL history to do so. Witten became the fastest tight end to reach 700 catches, reaching the milestone in 145 games. Witten became the youngest wide receiver/tight end to reach 700 catches at 30 years and 133 days. This record was later broken in Week 3 by Cardinals' wide receiver Larry Fitzgerald who totaled 707 career catches with 29 years, 23 days. Witten's 58-yard performance gave him 7,977 receiving yards for his career passing former Cowboy Jackie Smith for fourth all-time in receiving yards among tight ends.

After Week 3, Witten passed Ozzie Newsome for third place all-time in receiving yards among tight ends. During a Week 8 29–24 loss to the Giants, Witten caught a career-high 18 passes for a career-high 167 yards. This is also a record for receptions by a tight end; the previous record of 15 receptions was set by Kellen Winslow in 1984. In the next game against the Atlanta Falcons, Witten set the Cowboys' all-time receptions record of 754, surpassing Michael Irvin's previous record of 750.

During Week 16 against the New Orleans Saints, Witten set the NFL single-season record for receptions by a tight end (103), breaking the previous record of 102 receptions, which had been set by Tony Gonzalez in 2004. Witten extended the record to 110 in the season finale.

On December 26, Witten was selected to his eighth Pro Bowl. For the second time in his career, Witten was nominated for the Walter Payton Man of the Year Award, this time winning the award and the $25,000 donation to his charity. Overall, he finished the 2012 season with 110 receptions for 1,039 yards and three touchdowns. His 110 receptions were the second-most in franchise history behind Michael Irvin (111 in 1995) and ranked fifth in the NFL for the season. Witten then received the Bart Starr Award and was ranked 41st among his peers on the NFL Top 100 Players of 2013.

==== 2013 season ====
During the season opener against the New York Giants, Witten had two receiving touchdowns in the 36–31 victory. In the next game against the Kansas City Chiefs, Witten surpassed Shannon Sharpe with the second most receptions as a tight end in NFL history. His three catches during the game brought his career total to 817.

During Week 5 against the Denver Broncos, Witten had seven receptions for 121 receiving yards and a touchdown in the 51–48 loss. During Week 12 in the second divisional game against the Giants, he added two more receiving touchdowns in the 24–21 victory. In the season finale against the Philadelphia Eagles, he had 12 receptions for 135 yards during the narrow 24–22 loss. Witten finished the 2013 season with 73 receptions for 851 yards and eight touchdowns in 16 games and starts. He was named to the Pro Bowl for the ninth time in his career. Witten was ranked 98th by his fellow players on the NFL Top 100 Players of 2014.

==== 2014 season ====
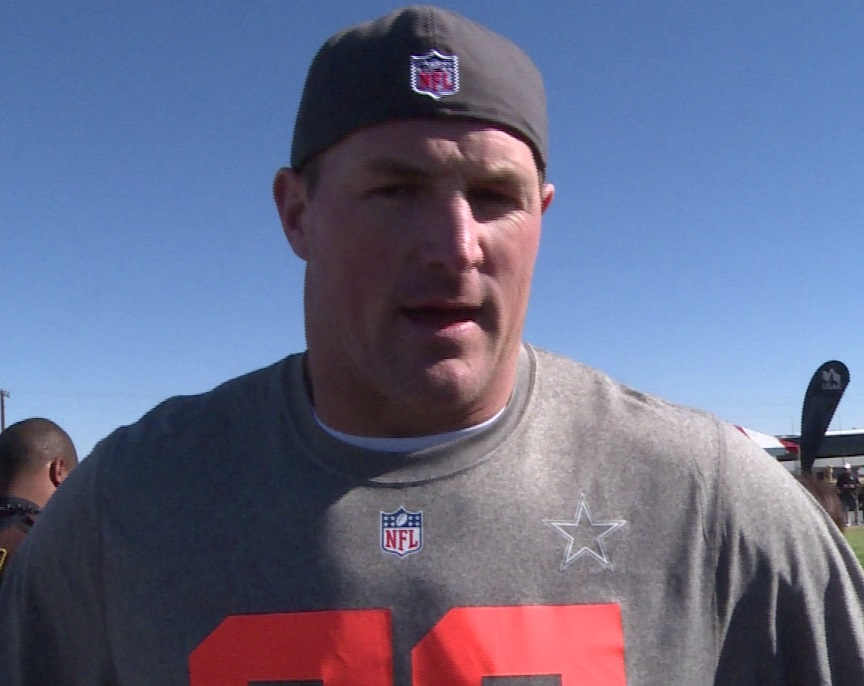
Witten at the 2015 Pro Bowl

During Week 5 against the Houston Texans, Witten became only the third tight end with 10,000 career receiving yards, joining Shannon Sharpe and Tony Gonzalez.

Witten became the all-time leader for consecutive starts by a tight end after starting against the Seattle Seahawks in Week 6. In that same game, Witten also became the second tight end in NFL history to reach 900 receptions.

During Week 7, Witten had 27 receiving yards against the New York Giants to move his career receiving yards to 10,065 to pass Shannon Sharpe (10,060) for the second-most receiving yards by an NFL tight end. During Week 16, Witten sprained his knee against the Indianapolis Colts but was still able to play in the season finale against the Washington Redskins.

That season, the Cowboys emphasized the running game and although his receiving production declined, his blocking was noticed while helping DeMarco Murray lead the NFL in rushing. Witten finished with 60 receptions for 654 yards and five touchdowns in 16 games and starts. He was named to his tenth career Pro Bowl for his 2014 season. Witten was ranked 93rd by his peers on the NFL Top 100 Players of 2015.

==== 2015 season ====
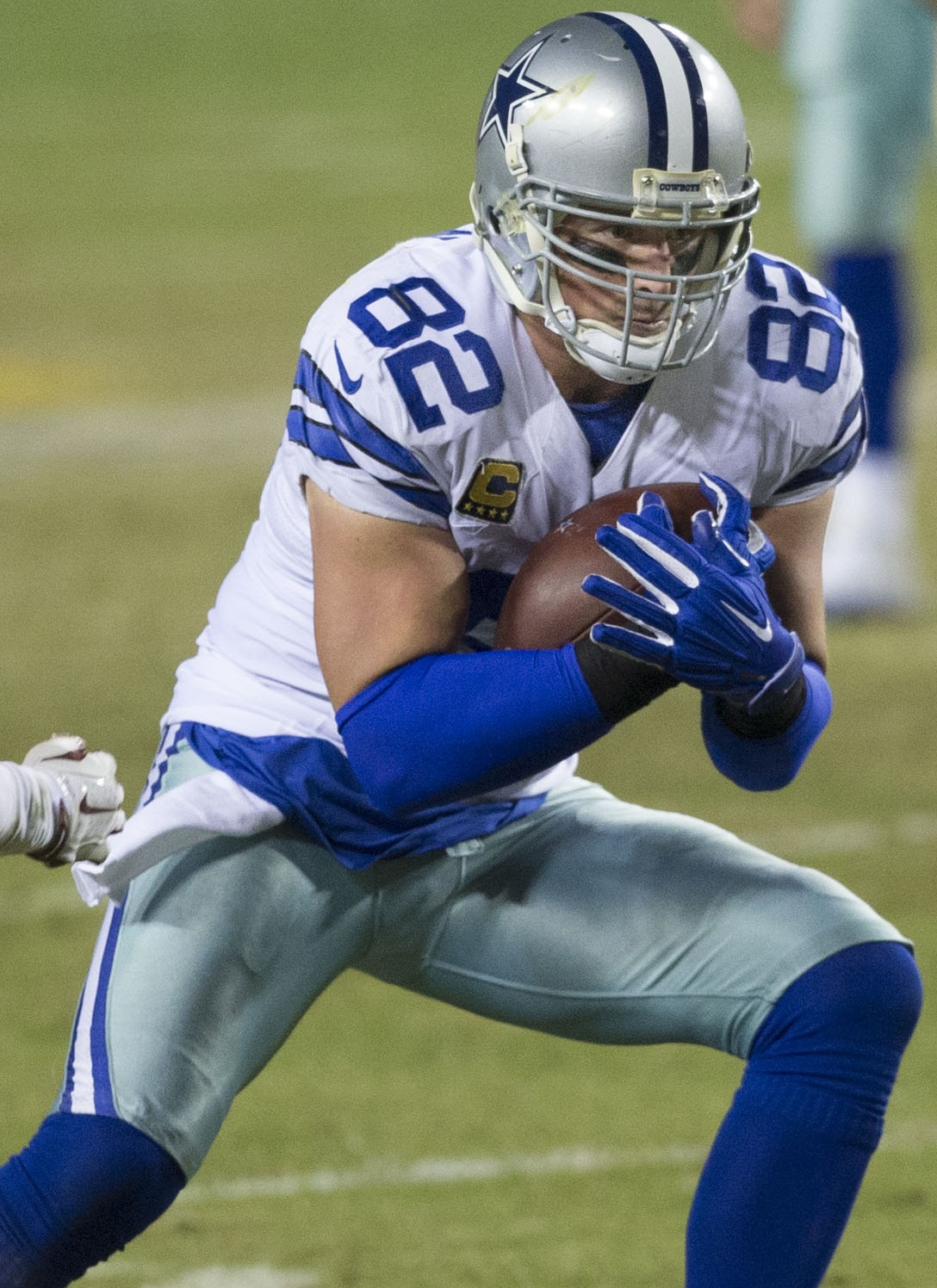
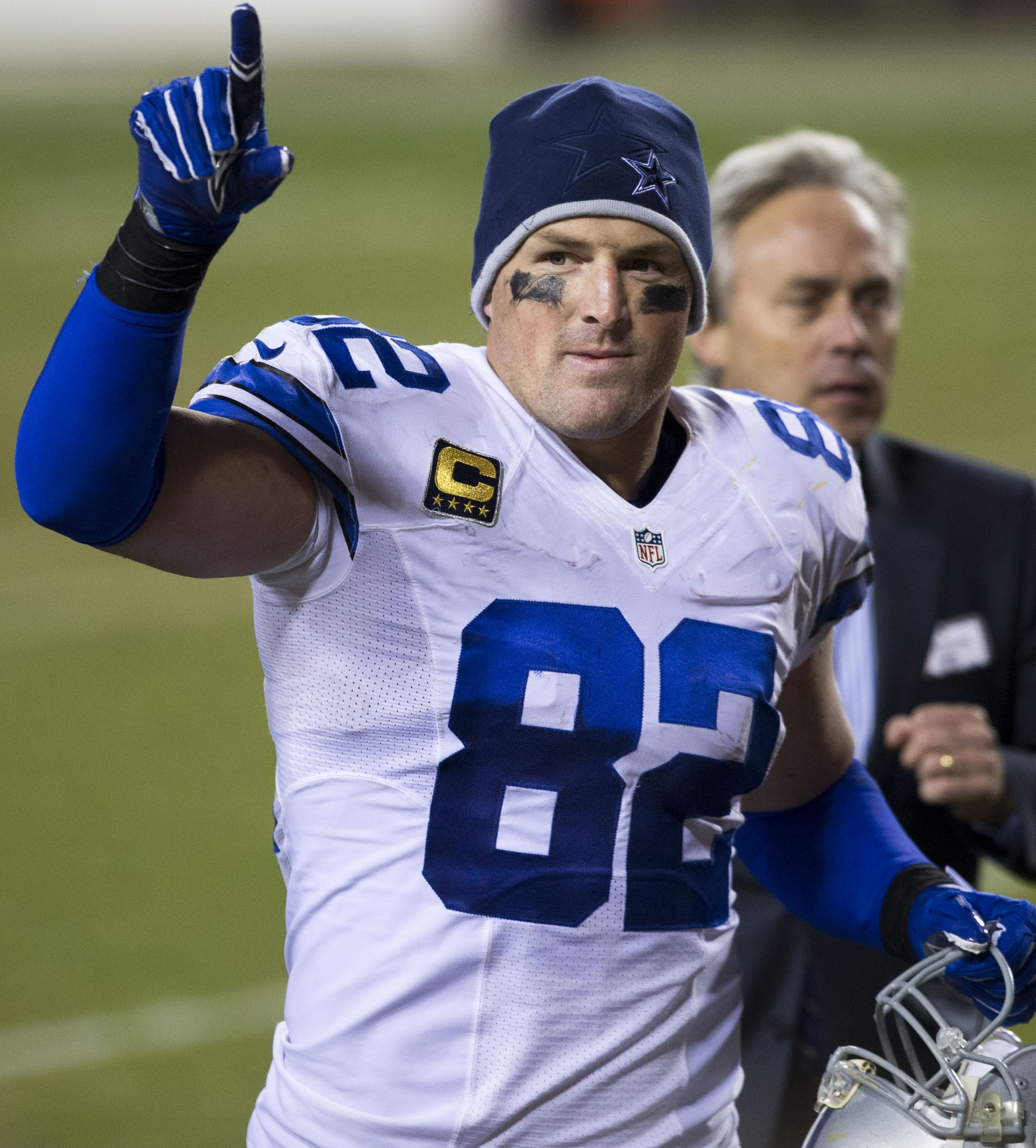
Witten in 2015

During the season opener against the New York Giants, Witten had eight receptions for 60 yards and two touchdowns, including a go-ahead touchdown with only 13 seconds remaining, in the narrow 27–26 victory. In the next game against the Philadelphia Eagles, Witten suffered a right knee injury and two sprained ankles but was able to only miss a play and a half.

On November 22 against the Miami Dolphins, Witten became the franchise's iron man, playing his 196th consecutive game and surpassing Bob Lilly. Two weeks later onMonday Night Football against the Washington Redskins, Witten became the 12th player and second tight end in NFL history to reach 1,000 receptions. The only other tight end with 1,000 or more catches is Tony Gonzalez. During Week 16 against the Buffalo Bills, Witten set the Cowboys record with his 118th consecutive game with a reception, passing Michael Irvin.

During the 2015 season, Witten was asked to be more involved in the blocking than usual, because of the team playing with four different starting quarterbacks with varying degrees of knowledge of the offense. He started all 16 games and led the Cowboys with 77 receptions for 713 yards and three touchdowns.

==== 2016 season ====
Against the Philadelphia Eagles in Week 8, Witten caught the game-winning touchdown in overtime, making him the first player in franchise history to score in 14 seasons. In the next game against the Cleveland Browns, Witten had eight receptions for 134 yards and a touchdown in the 35–10 victory. He finished the season 16 receiving yards shy of Michael Irvin's all-time franchise record. Overall, Witten started all 16 games and finished the regular season with 69 receptions for 673 yards and three touchdowns. He caught his first career postseason touchdown from Dak Prescott in the 34–31 Divisional Round loss to the Green Bay Packers.

==== 2017 season ====
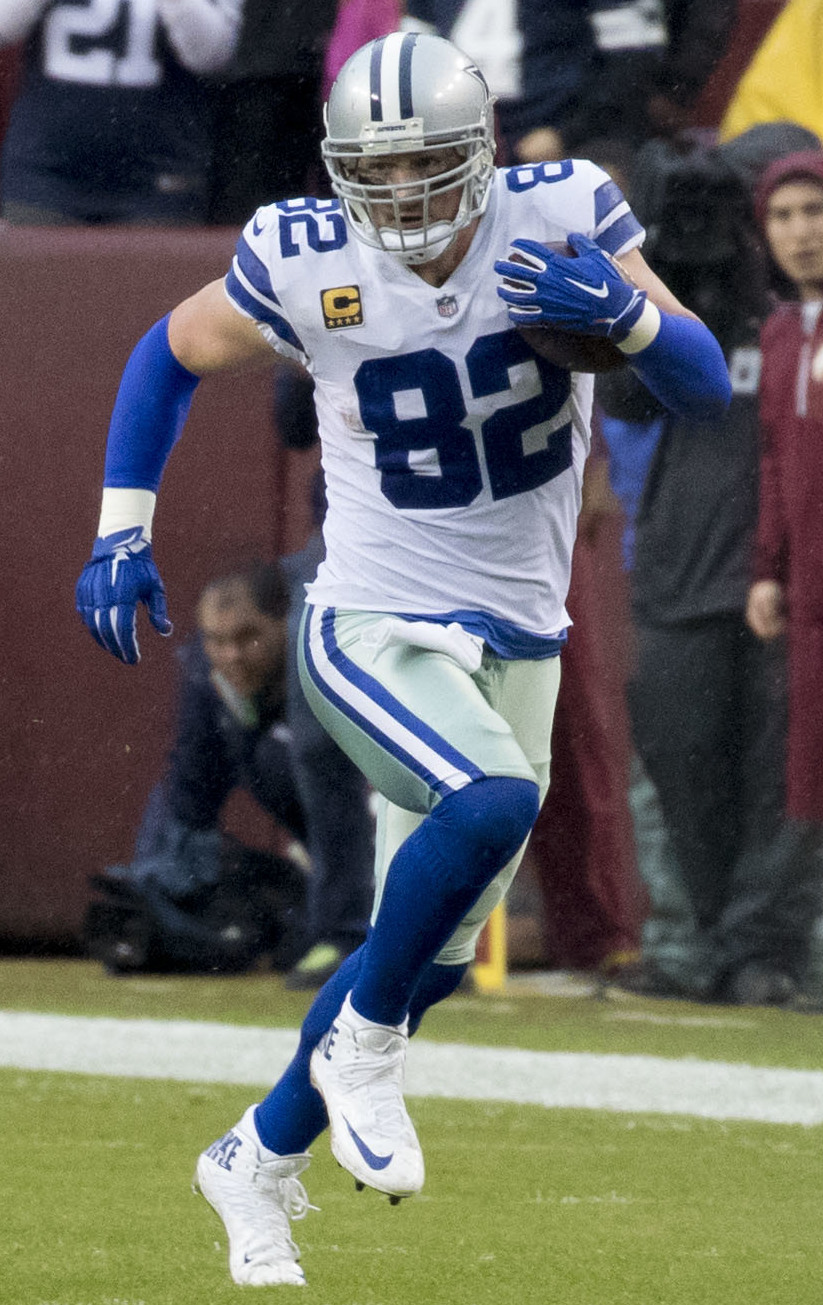
Witten in 2017

On March 28, 2017, Witten signed a four-year contract extension with the Cowboys through the 2021 season.

During the season-opening 19–3 victory over the New York Giants on Sunday Night Football, Witten recorded the Cowboys' lone touchdown. He also passed Michael Irvin for most career receiving yards in franchise history and also became the third player in NFL history to have at least 150 catches against one team, joining Jerry Rice and Larry Fitzgerald. In the next game against the Denver Broncos, Witten had 10 receptions for 97 yards and a touchdown during the 42–17 road loss. He started all 16 games and finished the season with 63 receptions for 560 yards and five touchdowns, on his way to his 11th Pro Bowl, which tied a Cowboys record with Bob Lilly.

=== Initial retirement ===
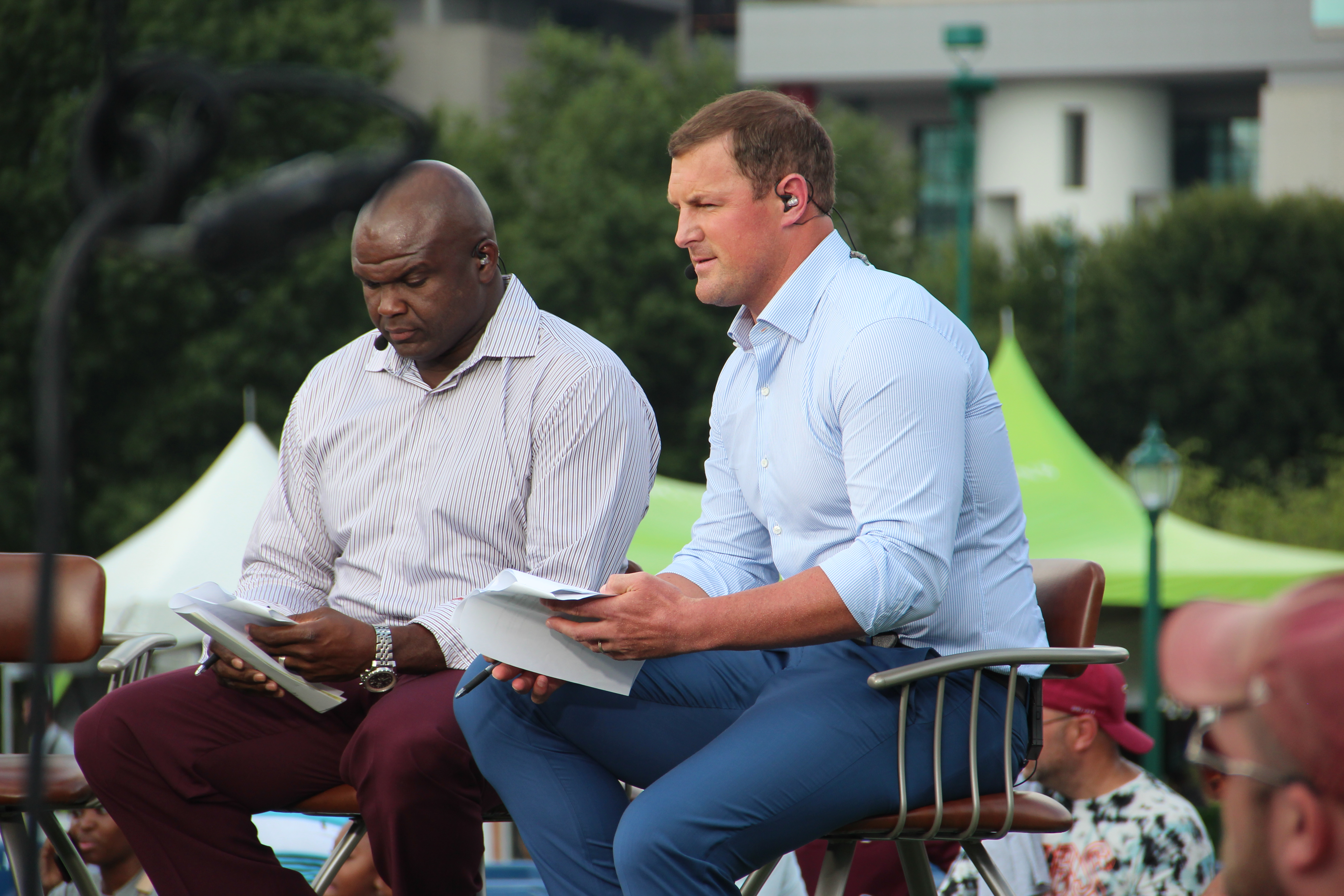
Witten (right) during his initial retirement in 2018

On April 26, 2018, reports surfaced that Witten was going to retire and accept a position as the lead analyst for ESPN's Monday Night Football telecasts. A week later, Witten officially announced his retirement and confirmed he would be joining Monday Night Football for the 2018 season.

=== Dallas Cowboys (second stint) ===
On February 28, 2019, ESPN announced that Witten would return to the Cowboys on a one-year, $4.5 million deal, and leave his Monday Night Football position at the company.

In his return, Witten had three receptions for 15 yards and a touchdown during the season-opening 35–17 victory over the New York Giants.

Witten finished the 2019 season with 63 receptions for 529 yards and four touchdowns in 16 games and starts.

=== Las Vegas Raiders ===
On March 25, 2020, Witten signed a one-year contract with the Las Vegas Raiders.

During Week 4 against the Buffalo Bills, Witten had his first touchdown as a Raider on a three-yard reception from quarterback Derek Carr. He was fined US$15,000 by the NFL on October 5, 2020, for attending a maskless charity event hosted by teammate Darren Waller during the COVID-19 pandemic in violation of the NFL's COVID-19 protocols for the 2020 season.

Witten finished the 2020 season with 13 receptions for 69 yards and two touchdowns in 16 games and seven starts.

=== Retirement ===
On January 27, 2021, Witten once again announced his retirement from the NFL and stated his intention to sign a one-day contract to retire as a member of the Cowboys.

== Walter Payton Man of the Year Work ==
In 2007, Witten and his wife Michelle established the Jason Witten SCORE Foundation, a non-profit organization supporting youth and domestic violence prevention programs in Texas and Tennessee. The foundation's initiatives include the "SCOREkeepers" program, which places trained male mentors in family violence shelters to model positive male behavior, and the "Coaching Boys into Men" program, which educates high school athletes about dating violence. He also hosts an annual free youth football camp in his hometown of Elizabethton, Tennessee.

In recognition of his charitable work and athletic performance, Witten was named the 2012 Walter Payton NFL Man of the Year, becoming the third Dallas Cowboys player to win the honor after Roger Staubach (1978) and Troy Aikman (1997).

== NFL career statistics ==
Legend
**Bold**	Career high

=== Regular season ===
Year	Team	Games		Receiving					Fumbles	
Year	Team	GP	GS	Rec	Yds	Avg	Lng	TD	Fum	Lost
2003	DAL	15	7	35	347	9.9	36T	1	0	0
2004	DAL	16	15	87	980	11.3	42T	6	**2**	**1**
2005	DAL	16	16	66	757	11.5	34	6	0	0
2006	DAL	16	15	64	754	11.8	42	1	0	0
2007	DAL	16	16	96	**1,145**	**11.9**	53	7	1	**1**
2008	DAL	16	16	81	952	11.8	42	4	0	0
2009	DAL	16	16	94	1,030	11.0	**69**	2	0	0
2010	DAL	16	16	94	1,002	10.7	33	**9**	1	**1**
2011	DAL	16	16	79	942	**11.9**	64	5	1	0
2012	DAL	16	16	**110**	1,039	9.4	36	3	0	0
2013	DAL	16	16	73	851	11.7	34	8	0	0
2014	DAL	16	16	64	703	11.0	34	5	0	0
2015	DAL	16	16	77	713	9.3	35	3	1	**1**
2016	DAL	16	16	69	673	9.8	35	3	1	**1**
2017	DAL	16	16	63	560	8.9	28T	5	1	**1**
2019	DAL	16	16	63	529	8.4	33	4	1	**1**
2020	LV	16	7	13	69	5.3	15	2	0	0
Career		271	252	1,228	13,046	10.8	69	74	9	7

=== Postseason ===
Year	Team	Games		Receiving					Fumbles	
Year	Team	GP	GS	Rec	Yds	Avg	Lng	TD	Fum	Lost
2003	DAL	1	1	4	30	7.5	12	0	0	0
2006	DAL	1	1	3	57	**19.0**	**32**	0	**1**	**1**
2007	DAL	1	1	7	81	11.6	20	0	0	0
2009	DAL	2	2	**14**	125	8.9	22	0	0	0
2014	DAL	2	2	11	**134**	12.2	21	0	0	0
2016	DAL	1	1	6	59	9.8	15	**1**	0	0
Career		8	8	45	486	10.8	32	1	1	1

=== NFL records and achievements ===
- Most receptions in a single game by a tight end: 18 (October 28, 2012)
- 2012 Walter Payton NFL Man of the Year winner
- 4th in receptions in NFL history: 1,228 (as of 2021)
- Most consecutive games played by a tight end: 235 (243 including playoffs)
- Most consecutive games started by a tight end: 179 (186 including playoffs)
- Fastest tight end to make 600 receptions (125 games)

=== Cowboys franchise records ===
- Most career receptions: 1,215
- Most career receiving yards: 12,977
- Most receptions in a single game: 18 (October 28, 2012, against the New York Giants)
- Most games played: 255
- Most consecutive games started: 179
- First tight end to reach 1,000 receiving yards in a season
- First tight end to have at least 65 receptions in consecutive seasons
- First player in franchise history to score in 16 seasons

== Coaching career ==
On February 1, 2021, Witten was named the head football coach at Liberty Christian School, which is the same school that his children attend. They compete in the TAPPS D1 division for football. In 2023, he would lead the school to the state football championship (its fourth and its first unbeaten season in school history), the first title (at any level) in his career. In 2024, the Warriors won a second straight state title. This was the first time in school history where the football team won back-to-back football state championships.

On January 8, 2026, Witten was hired as the tight ends coach for the Oklahoma Sooners. He joined former Cowboys teammate DeMarco Murray, who had served as the Sooners' running backs coach since 2020. Murray has since left Oklahoma and is now part of the coaching staff with the Kansas City Chiefs as of 2026. On November 2, 2026, Witten was named interim offensive coordinator after Ben Arbuckle was fired due to poor performance.

== Personal life ==
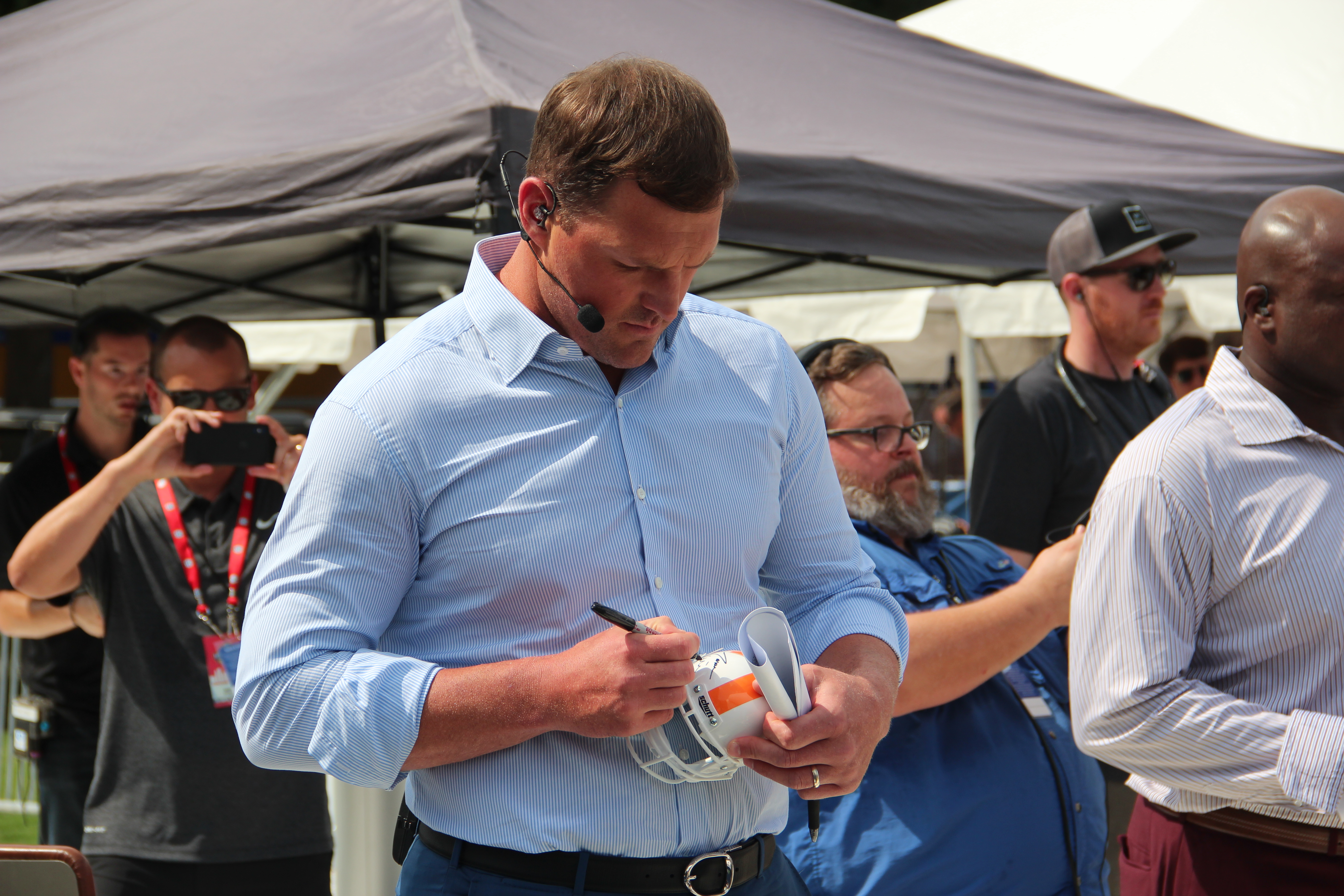
Witten signing autographs in 2018

Witten resides in Westlake, Texas, located in the Dallas – Fort Worth Metroplex, with his wife Michelle, an emergency room nurse at Dallas's Parkland Memorial Hospital, and their four children, C.J., Cooper, Landry, and Hadley Grace. Witten is a Christian, and appears in a video on I Am Second in which he talks about his faith.

Witten wrote an opinion piece for ESPN, titled "How Twitter has become NFL locker room poison" in which he detailed the potential negative impact social media can have, particularly on younger players, from his personal experiences.

In 2021 and just days after his second retirement from the NFL, Witten spurned the overtures of several NFL and college teams to coach and was named the head football coach at Liberty Christian School in Argyle, Texas.
