= List of most consecutive starts and games played by NFL players =

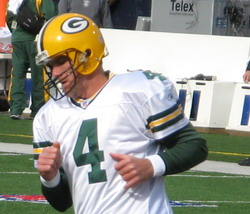
Brett Favre, the all-time leader in consecutive starts by an NFL player.

This is a list of the most consecutive starts and games played by a player by position in the National Football League (NFL).

Quarterback Brett Favre's streak of 297 consecutive games started is the longest all-time. Among defensive players, Jim Marshall's 270 is the longest. Of special note is punter Jeff Feagles, who played in 352 consecutive games which is the longest of all-time for a special teams player. Special teams players are not credited with starts in the NFL. In 2018, Ryan Kerrigan became the most recent player to surpass someone at his position for consecutive starts, having broken the previous mark for left outside linebackers previously held by Jason Gildon.

== Leaderboards ==
Bold denotes an active streak

=== Consecutive games started ===
==== All-time starts ====
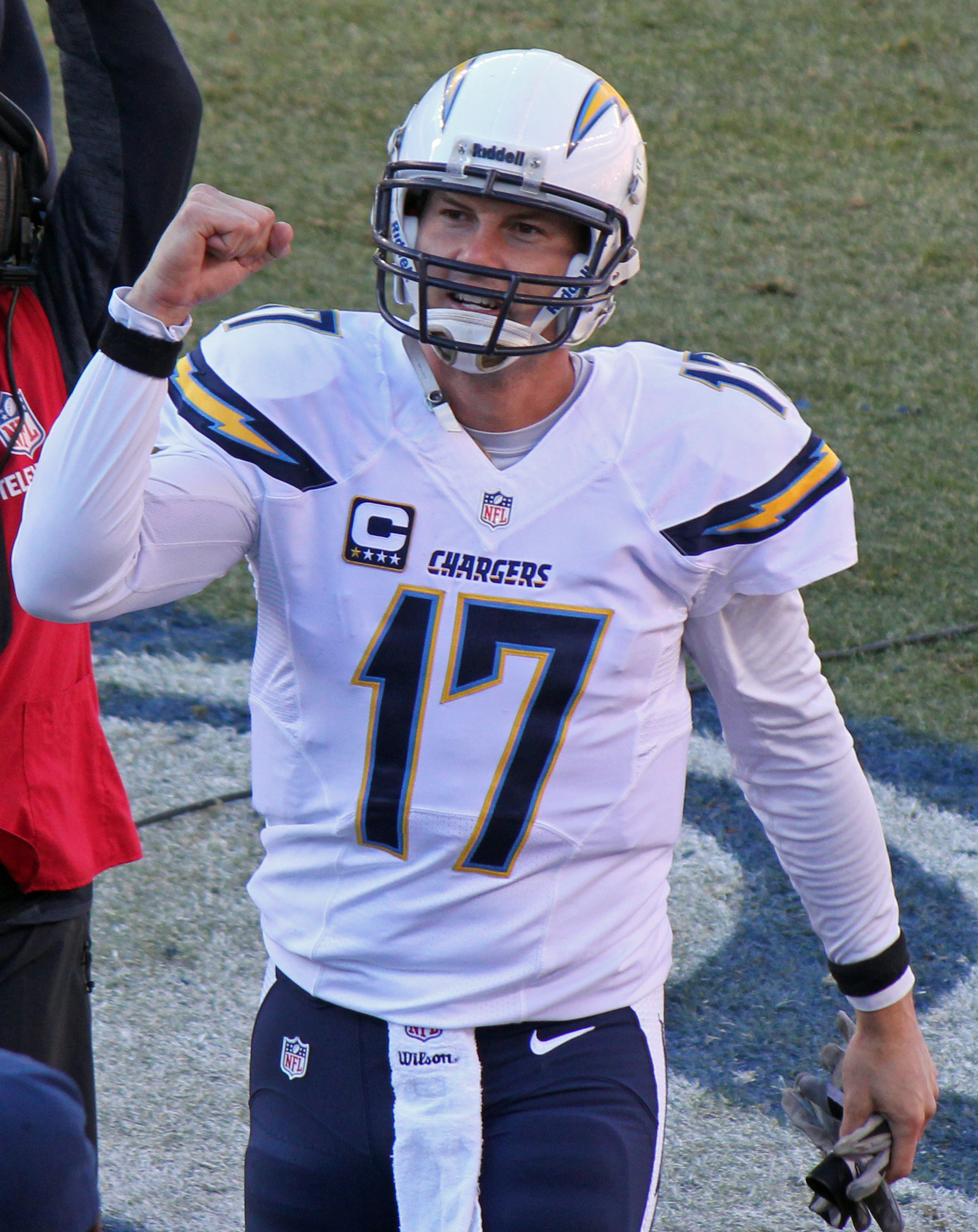
Philip Rivers, the most recent player to achieve 200 consecutive starts by an NFL player.

Minimum 200 consecutive regular season starts

Rank	Player	Pos	Period	Teams	Consecutive starts	Playoffs	Total	References
1	Brett Favre	QB	September 27, 1992 – December 5, 2010	GB/NYJ/MIN	297	24	321	
2T	Jim Marshall	DE	September 17, 1961 – December 16, 1979	MIN	270	19	289	
3T	Bill Romanowski	LB	April 9, 1988 – September 22, 2003	SF/PHI/DEN/OAK	243	28	271	
3T	Philip Rivers	QB	November 9, 2006 – December 22, 2025	SD/LAC/IND	243	12	255	
5	Mick Tingelhoff	C	September 16, 1962 – December 17, 1978	MIN	240	19	259	
6	Bruce Matthews	G	November 29, 1987 – June 1, 2002	OIL/TEN	229	15	244	
7	Will Shields	RG	December 9, 1993 – January 6, 2007	KC	223	8	231	
8T	Alan Page	DT	August 10, 1967 – December 20, 1981	MIN/CHI	215	19	234	
8T	Ronde Barber	CB	November 21, 1999 – December 30, 2012	TB	215	9	224	
8T	London Fletcher	LB	December 11, 2000 – December 29, 2013	SLR/BUF/WAS	215	6	221	
11T	Jim Otto	C	November 9, 1960 – December 14, 1974	OAK	210	13	223	
11T	Eli Manning	QB	November 24, 2004 – November 23, 2017	NYG	210	12	222	
13T	Derrick Brooks	LB	January 9, 1996 – December 28, 2008	TB	208	11	219	
13T	Peyton Manning	QB	September 6, 1998 – January 8, 2011	IND	208	19	227	
15	Gene Upshaw	LG	October 9, 1967 – October 4, 1981	OAK	207	24	231	
16	Randall McDaniel	LG	October 22, 1989 – January 12, 2002	MIN/TB	202	16	218	

==== Active leaders ====
Minimum 100 consecutive regular season starts

Player	Pos	Teams	Reg. season starts	References
Jake Matthews	OT	ATL	206	
Josh Allen	QB	BUF	131	

=== Consecutive games played ===
==== All-time games played ====
Top 25 players for consecutive regular season games played

Rank	Player	Pos	Period	Teams	Consecutive games	Playoffs	Total	References
1	Jeff Feagles	P	April 9, 1988 – March 1, 2010	NE/PHI/ARI/SEA/NYG	352	11	363	
2	Brett Favre	QB	September 13, 1992 – May 12, 2010	GB/NYJ/MIN	299	24	323	
3	Jim Marshall	DE	September 25, 1960 – December 16, 1979	CLE/MIN	282	19	301	
4	Mason Crosby	K	September 9, 2007 – January 8, 2023	GB/NYG	258	23	281	
5	London Fletcher	LB	June 9, 1998 – December 29, 2013	SLR/BUF/WAS	256	9	265	
6	Shane Lechler	P	September 29, 2002 – December 31, 2017	OAK/HOU	254	10	264	
7	L. P. Ladouceur	LS	February 10, 2005 – March 1, 2021	DAL	253	9	262	
**8**	**Jon Weeks**	**LS**	September 12, 2010–present	**HOU/SF**	**251**	**14**	**265**	
9	Morten Andersen	K	October 25, 1987 – December 15, 2002	NO/ATL/NYG/KC	248	8	256	
10	Chris Gardocki	P	November 28, 1991 – December 31, 2006	CHI/IND/CLE/PIT	244	14	258	
11	Bill Romanowski	LB	April 9, 1988 – September 22, 2003	SF/PHI/DEN/OAK	243	28	271	
12	Philip Rivers	QB	December 31, 2005 – March 1, 2021	SD/LAC/IND	241	12	253	
13T	Mick Tingelhoff	C	September 16, 1962 – December 17, 1978	MIN	240	19	259	
13T	Ryan Longwell	K	January 9, 1997 – January 1, 2012	GB/MIN	240	13	253	
13T	Ronde Barber	DB	June 9, 1998 – December 30, 2012	TB	240	9	249	
16	Sam Koch	P	October 9, 2006 – December 27, 2020	BAL	239	18	257	
17	Jason Witten	TE	October 19, 2003 – December 31, 2017	DAL	235	8	243	
18T	Jim Bakken	K	November 25, 1962 – December 17, 1978	SLC	234	2	236	
18T	Gary Anderson	K	October 25, 1987 – July 1, 2002	PIT/PHI/SF/MIN/TEN	234	17	251	
20	Bruce Matthews	OL	November 29, 1987 – June 1, 2002	OIL/TEN	232	15	247	
21	Jim Turner	K	December 9, 1964 – December 17, 1979	NYJ/DEN	228	8	236	
22T	George Blanda	K/QB	November 9, 1960 – December 21, 1975	OIL/OAK	224	18	242	
22T	John Hadl	QB/P	July 9, 1962 – December 18, 1977	SD/LAR/GB/OIL	224	4	228	
22T	Dan Stryzinski	P	September 9, 1990 – December 28, 2003	PIT/TB/ATL/KC/NYJ	224	4	228	
22T	Will Shields	RG	May 9, 1993 – December 31, 2006	KC	224	8	232	
22T	Derrick Brooks	LB	March 9, 1995 – December 28, 2008	TB	224	11	235	
22T	Kevin Carter	DE/DT	March 9, 1995 – December 28, 2008	SLR/TEN/MIA/TB	224	9	233	
22T	Ethan Albright	LS	January 9, 1996 – March 1, 2010	BUF/WAS	224	6	230	
22T	John Denney	LS	November 9, 2005 – December 30, 2018	MIA	224	2	226	

== Consecutive starts by position ==
=== Offensive skilled ===
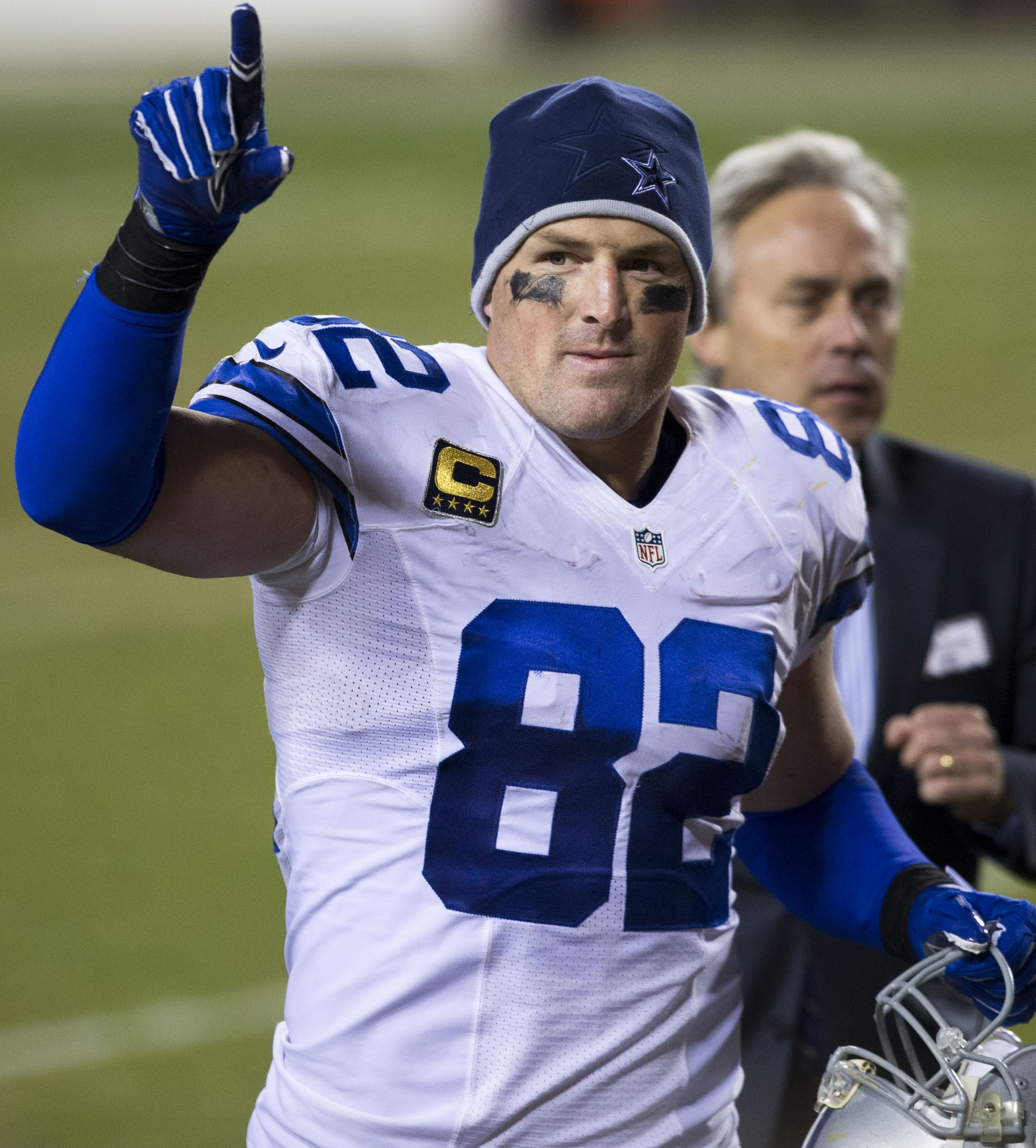
Jason Witten, the all-time leader in consecutive starts by an NFL tight end.

Position	Player	Period	Teams	Consecutive starts	Playoffs	Total	References
Quarterback	Brett Favre	September 27, 1992 – May 12, 2010	GB/NYJ/MIN	297	24	321	
Tight end	Jason Witten	December 16, 2006 – December 31, 2017	DAL	179	7	186	
Wide receiver	Tim Brown	December 14, 1992 – July 12, 2003	RAI/OAK	176	9	185	
Running back	Walter Payton	July 12, 1975 – September 20, 1987	CHI	170	8	178	
Fullback	Jim Brown	September 29, 1957 – December 19, 1965	CLE	118	4	122	

=== Offensive linemen ===
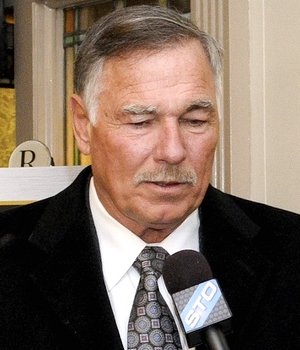
Doug Dieken, the all-time leader in consecutive starts by an NFL offensive left tackle.

Position	Player	Period	Teams	Consecutive starts	Playoffs	Total	References
Center	Mick Tingelhoff	September 16, 1962 – December 17, 1978	MIN	240	19	259	
Right guard	Will Shields	December 9, 1993 – December 31, 2006	KC	223	8	231	
Left guard	Gene Upshaw	October 9, 1967 – April 10, 1981	OAK	207	24	231	
Left tackle	Jake Matthews	September 18, 2014 – present	ATL	195	5	200	
Right tackle	Jon Runyan	August 31, 1997 – December 28, 2008	TEN/PHI	192	21	213	

=== Defensive linemen ===
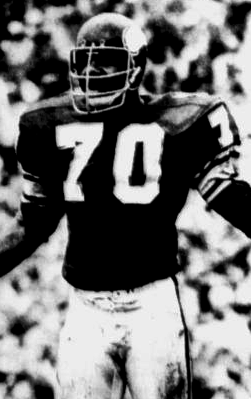
Jim Marshall, the all-time leader in consecutive starts by an NFL defensive end.

Position	Player	Period	Teams	Consecutive starts	Playoffs	Total	References
Defensive end	Jim Marshall	September 17, 1961 – December 16, 1979	MIN	270	19	289	
Defensive tackle	Alan Page	August 10, 1967 – December 20, 1981	MIN/CHI	215	19	234	
Nose tackle	Fred Smerlas	July 9, 1980 – September 20, 1987	BUF	107	3	110	

=== Linebackers ===
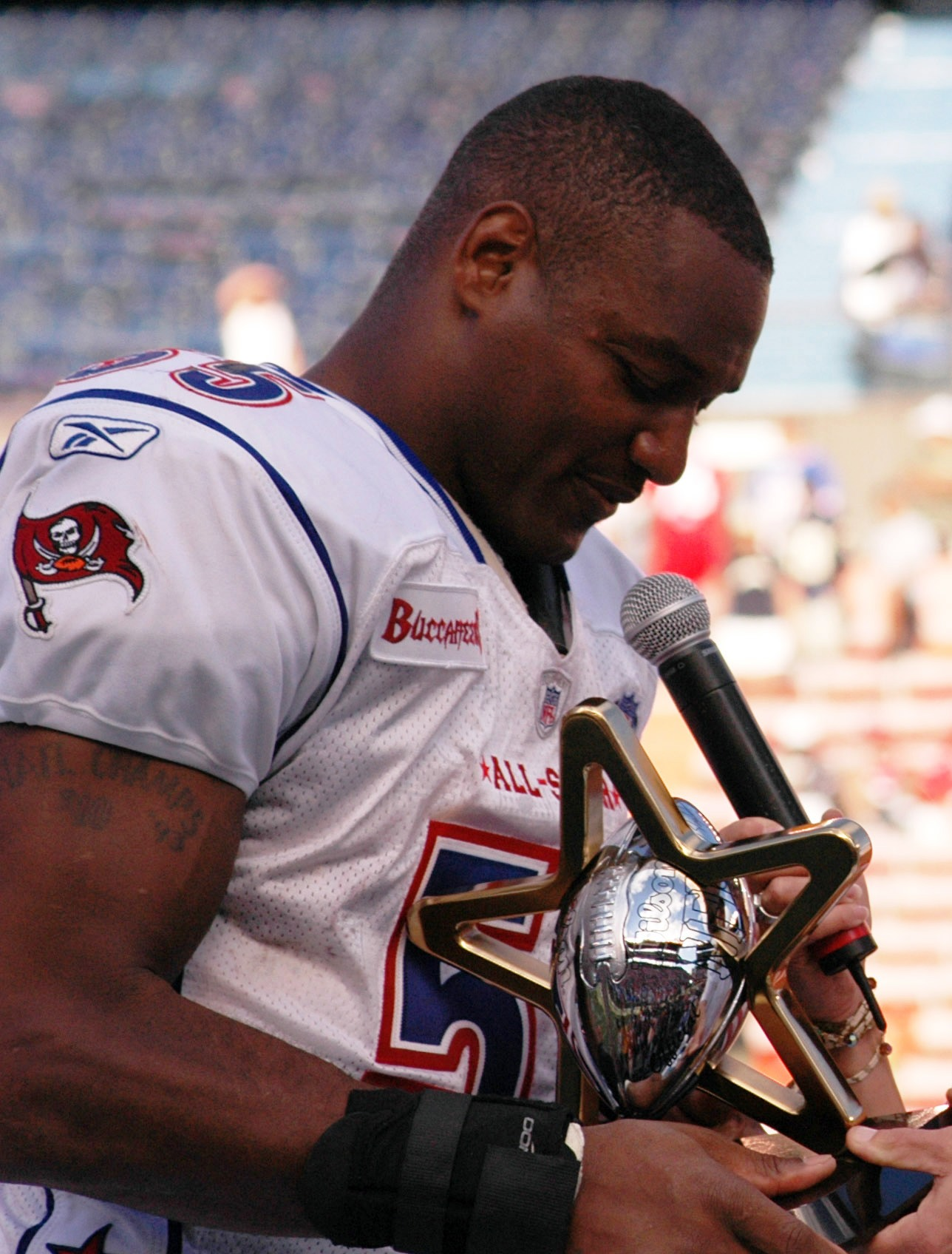
Derrick Brooks, the all-time leader in consecutive starts by an NFL weakside linebacker.

Position	Player	Period	Teams	Consecutive starts	Playoffs	Total	References
Linebacker	London Fletcher	June 9, 1998 – December 29, 2013	SLR/BUF/WAS	256	9	265	
Linebacker	Bill Romanowski	April 9, 1988 – September 22, 2003	SF/PHI/DEN/OAK	243	28	271	
Outside linebacker	Derrick Brooks	January 9, 1996 – December 28, 2008	TB	224	11	235	
Linebacker	London Fletcher	December 11, 2000 – December 29, 2013	SLR/BUF/WAS	215	6	221	
Middle linebacker	Lee Roy Jordan	September 18, 1966 – December 12, 1976	DAL	154	19	173	

=== Defensive backs ===
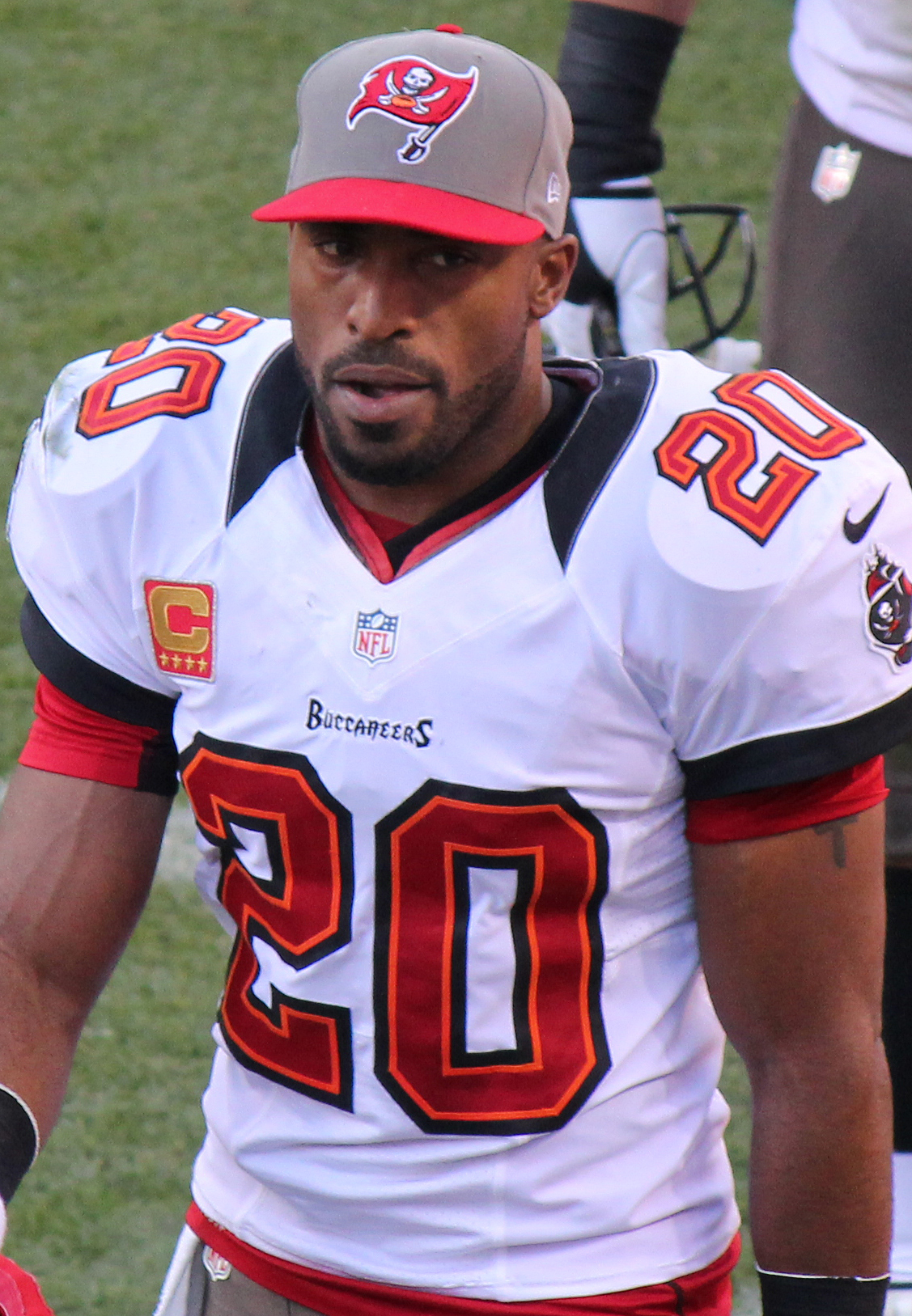
Ronde Barber, the all-time leader in consecutive starts by an NFL defensive back.

Position	Player	Period	Teams	Consecutive starts	Playoffs	Total	References
Defensive back	Ronde Barber	November 21, 1999 – December 30, 2012	TB	215	9	224	
Cornerback	Ronde Barber	November 21, 1999 – September 9, 2012	TB	200	9	209	
Safety	Willie Wood	September 17, 1961 – December 19, 1971	GB	154	9	163	
Strong safety	Bill Thompson	September 16, 1973 – December 20, 1981	DEN	134	5	139	
Free safety	Darryl Williams	November 10, 1992 – December 27, 1998	CIN/SEA	108	0	108	

=== Special teams ===
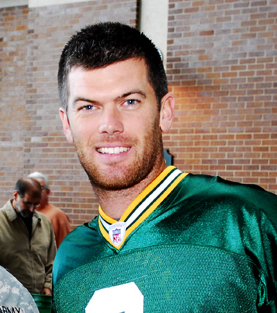
Mason Crosby, the all-time leader in consecutive games played by an NFL kicker.

Position	Player	Period	Teams	Consecutive games	Playoffs	Total	References
Punter	Jeff Feagles	April 9, 1988 – March 1, 2010	NE/PHI/ARI/SEA/NYG	352	11	363	
Kicker	Mason Crosby	September 9, 2007 – January 8, 2023	GB	258	23	281	
Long snapper	L. P. Ladouceur	February 10, 2005 – March 1, 2021	DAL	253	9	262	
Kick/Punt returner	Carl Roaches	July 9, 1980 – December 16, 1984	OIL	73	1	74	

Note: Games played by special teams players such as kickers and punters are not recognized officially as starts by the NFL.

== See also ==
- Iron man
- List of most consecutive starts by an NFL quarterback
- List of NFL players by games played
- List of NFL individual records#Starts
- List of most consecutive games with touchdown passes in the NFL
