= Marvin Upshaw =

American football player (1946–2024)

No. 84, 81, 71
- Positions: Defensive end, Defensive tackle

Personal information
- Born: November 22, 1946; Robstown, Texas, U.S.
- Died: June 4, 2024 (aged 77); Modesto, California, U.S.
- Listed height: 6 ft 4 in (1.93 m)
- Listed weight: 260 lb (118 kg)

Career information
- High school: Robstown
- College: Trinity (TX)
- NFL draft: 1968: 1st round, 21st overall pick

Career history
- Cleveland Browns (1968–1969); Kansas City Chiefs (1970–1975); St. Louis Cardinals (1976)

Career NFL statistics
- Fumble recoveries: 5
- Interceptions: 2
- Touchdowns: 1
- Sacks: 30.5
- Stats at Pro Football Reference

Marvin Allen Upshaw (November 22, 1946 – June 4, 2024) was an American professional football player who was a defensive lineman in the National Football League (NFL). He played college football for the Trinity Tigers. Upshaw played nine seasons in the NFL for the Cleveland Browns (1968–1969), the Kansas City Chiefs (1970–1975) and the St. Louis Cardinals (1976). His older brother Gene also played in the NFL.

Upshaw died in Modesto, California, on June 4, 2024, at the age of 77.
