= Robstown, Texas =

City of Robstown
- City
- Nicknames: Pickerland, Robé
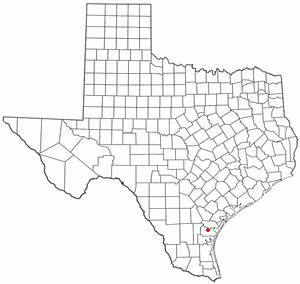
- Location in the state of Texas

- Coordinates: 27°47′33″N 97°40′10″W
- Country: United States
- State: Texas
- County: Nueces
- Mayor: Mary Ann Saenz

Area
  - Total: 12.98 sq mi (33.63 km^{2})
  - Land: 12.98 sq mi (33.63 km^{2})
  - Water: 0 sq mi (0.00 km^{2})
- Elevation: 72 ft (22 m)

Population (2020)
  - Total: 10,143
  - Density: 867/sq mi (334.8/km^{2})
- Time zone: UTC−6 (CST)
  - Summer (DST): UTC−5 (CDT)
- ZIP code: 78380
- Area code: 361
- FIPS code: 48-62600
- GNIS feature ID: 1345344
- Website: www.cityofrobstown.com

Robstown is a city in Nueces County, Texas, of the United States of America, and is a western suburb of Corpus Christi. It was founded in 1907 by a land speculator from Keota, Iowa by the name of George H. Paul. Paul purchased 10,410.43 acres of the Driscoll Ranch located north of the Texas-Mexican Railway built in 1875. Around the same period, Robert Driscoll Jr. opened a small shop known locally as "Robs Store". The residents soon started referring to the surrounding settlement as "Rob's town", a name that eventually became Robstown. The population was 10,383 as of July 1, 2024.

Robstown has its own city government with the current Mayor, Mary Ann Y. Saenz as of March 18, 2026. There are six council member seats with the current members being John A. Ramon, Council Member Place #1; Victor Moreno, Council Member Place #2; Rene Paredez, Council Member Place #3; Adolfo Lopez, Council Member Place #4; J.C. Carrion, Council Member Place #5; and Lorraine Morales, Council Member #6.

The Texas State Legislature recognizes Robstown as the birthplace of Texas hold 'em poker. Texas hold'em was birthed in the early 1900s, but did not become widely known until 1967 when it was launched in Las Vegas, Nevada. Robstown is also known for its long-standing mascot, the "Cotton Pickers" used by the Robstown Independent school district. The Cotton Picker mascot reflects the city's agricultural heritage, as many families in the city of Robstown worked in the cotton industry. Prior to the cotton industry there were mesquite trees that needed to be cleared in order to grow cotton. The first plow invented to clear the land for agricultural use was the Mrazek Plow” in 1908 by Tom Mrazek.

== History ==
The area that would become Robstown was likely in the range of several different, nearby Native American tribes that were active in the Texas Gulf Coast. This would have included Karankawa, the Lipan-Apache, Tonkawa, and Coahuiltecan peoples. It is not known if the exact area of Robstown was inhabited by Indigenous people.

Robstown was sparsely inhabited until the early 1800s, when rancheros had arrived with cattle. These ranchers soon petitioned the King of Spain for land grants in the Nueces area, and a grant was issued to Vincente Lopez de Herrera. The area included in this grant was occasionally named Barraco Blanco or El Rancho de Diesmos Herrera, which was then shortened to Diesmero. Land ownership changed hands several times and was used entirely for pasture. The construction of the Texas-Mexican Railway would aid in the land's development, as farmers and ranchers moved to the area. One of these ranchers was Robert Driscoll, a former Confederate colonel who would eventually give his land, much of which was the present area of Robstown, to his son Robert Driscoll, Jr. Historian Kalani Banks describes how this sale would give Robstown its name:

On December 11, 1906, Robert Driscoll, Jr. was granted power-of-attorney for handling the sale of land at the intersection of the railroads at Robstown. [...] Local tradition is that someone asked Col. Driscoll what to call the land, and he said, "Call it Rob's town. He's in charge now."

Primarily, the town's industry would remain focused around agriculture and railroad work. Simon Peña, a railroad worker, would be the first to establish a permanent residence in the newly formed Robstown. The need for agricultural labor brought many settlers of Mexican descent.

As Mexican-Americans enrolled in predominantly Anglo-American schools, non-white students began to face discrimination. A Texas law in the 1930s required compulsory school attendance for children ages 8-14, but this law was not enforced well for Mexican children. On April 5, 1972, a walkout was organized by 150-350 students, who felt that the schools were perpetuating discriminatory practices. Student leaders met with Robstown High School principal Hoyt Chapman. Student demands included an end to verbal and physical abuse, for the library to be open after school, new textbooks, an end to grade deductions for students who had not received vaccinations, and for the introduction of a Chicano studies program. A refusal from the principal to meet demands led to a second walkout on April 11, 1972.

== Geography ==
Robstown is located at 27°47′33″N 97°40′10″W (27.792615, –97.669386).

According to the United States Census Bureau, the city has a total area of 12.1 square miles (31 km^{2}), all land.

=== Climate ===
The climate in Robstown is characterized by hot, humid summers and generally mild to cool winters. According to the Köppen climate classification system, Robstown has a humid subtropical climate, Cfa on climate maps. Robstown enjoys a great amount of sunshine all year round and will mildly see precipitation depending on the climate and influence of the Gulf of Mexico.

Climate data for Robstown, Texas (1981–2010 normals, extremes 1953–2012)
Month	Jan	Feb	Mar	Apr	May	Jun	Jul	Aug	Sep	Oct	Nov	Dec	Year
Record high °F (°C)	92 (33)	95 (35)	104 (40)	106 (41)	104 (40)	108 (42)	107 (42)	113 (45)	109 (43)	101 (38)	98 (37)	90 (32)	113 (45)
Mean daily maximum °F (°C)	67.2 (19.6)	70.8 (21.6)	76.9 (24.9)	82.9 (28.3)	87.8 (31.0)	92.7 (33.7)	94.8 (34.9)	96.0 (35.6)	91.7 (33.2)	85.4 (29.7)	77.0 (25.0)	68.9 (20.5)	82.7 (28.2)
Daily mean °F (°C)	56.6 (13.7)	60.1 (15.6)	66.3 (19.1)	72.8 (22.7)	78.8 (26.0)	83.3 (28.5)	85.0 (29.4)	85.8 (29.9)	81.7 (27.6)	74.8 (23.8)	66.5 (19.2)	58.1 (14.5)	72.5 (22.5)
Mean daily minimum °F (°C)	46.0 (7.8)	49.4 (9.7)	55.7 (13.2)	62.7 (17.1)	69.8 (21.0)	73.9 (23.3)	75.2 (24.0)	75.6 (24.2)	71.8 (22.1)	64.2 (17.9)	55.9 (13.3)	47.2 (8.4)	62.3 (16.8)
Record low °F (°C)	16 (−9)	20 (−7)	23 (−5)	37 (3)	43 (6)	58 (14)	63 (17)	64 (18)	50 (10)	32 (0)	25 (−4)	12 (−11)	12 (−11)
Average precipitation inches (mm)	1.79 (45)	2.05 (52)	1.86 (47)	1.64 (42)	3.06 (78)	2.92 (74)	3.31 (84)	3.05 (77)	4.81 (122)	3.62 (92)	2.41 (61)	1.62 (41)	32.14 (816)
Average snowfall inches (cm)	0.0 (0.0)	0.0 (0.0)	0.0 (0.0)	0.0 (0.0)	0.0 (0.0)	0.0 (0.0)	0.0 (0.0)	0.0 (0.0)	0.0 (0.0)	0.0 (0.0)	0.0 (0.0)	0.2 (0.51)	0.2 (0.51)
Average precipitation days (≥ 0.01 in)	6.9	6.6	6.7	5.7	5.1	5.2	4.9	5.4	8.6	5.5	5.5	6.0	72.1
Average snowy days (≥ 0.1 in)	0.0	0.0	0.0	0.0	0.0	0.0	0.0	0.0	0.0	0.0	0.0	0.0	0.0
Source: NOAA

== Demographics ==
Historical population
Census	Pop.	Note	%±
1920	948		—
1930	4,183		341.2%
1940	6,780		62.1%
1950	7,278		7.3%
1960	10,266		41.1%
1970	11,217		9.3%
1980	12,100		7.9%
1990	12,849		6.2%
2000	12,727		−0.9%
2010	11,487		−9.7%
2020	10,143		−11.7%
U.S. Decennial Census

=== 2020 census ===
As of the 2020 census, Robstown had a population of 10,143. The median age was 37.4 years, with 26.4% of residents under the age of 18 and 17.0% of residents 65 years of age or older. For every 100 females there were 92.6 males, and for every 100 females age 18 and over there were 89.1 males age 18 and over. There were 3,339 households in Robstown, of which 37.9% had children under the age of 18 living in them. Of all households, 37.6% were married-couple households, 17.4% were households with a male householder and no spouse or partner present, and 37.6% were households with a female householder and no spouse or partner present. About 20.7% of all households were made up of individuals and 10.2% had someone living alone who was 65 years of age or older. There were 3,904 housing units, of which 14.5% were vacant. The homeowner vacancy rate was 1.5% and the rental vacancy rate was 9.9%. 94.5% of residents lived in urban areas, while 5.5% lived in rural areas.

Racial composition as of the 2020 census
Race	Number	Percent
White	5,233	51.6%
Black or African American	155	1.5%
American Indian and Alaska Native	66	0.7%
Asian	32	0.3%
Native Hawaiian and Other Pacific Islander	5	0.0%
Some other race	1,450	14.3%
Two or more races	3,202	31.6%
Hispanic or Latino (of any race)	9,373	92.4%

Robstown racial composition (NH = Non-Hispanic) (Note: Note: the US Census treats Hispanic/Latino as an ethnic category. This table excludes Latinos from the racial categories and assigns them to a separate category. Hispanics/Latinos can be of any race.)
Race	Number	Percentage
White (NH)	562	5.54%
Black or African American (NH)	114	1.12%
Native American or Alaska Native (NH)	8	0.08%
Asian (NH)	17	0.17%
Pacific Islander (NH)	5	0.05%
Some Other Race (NH)	25	0.25%
Mixed/Multi-Racial (NH)	39	0.38%
Hispanic or Latino	9,373	92.41%
Total	10,143	

=== 2019 ===
Owner-occupied housing was 58.1% and the average household had 3.06 persons. Median value of housing was $52,900 and median gross rent was $688 per month. Females were 51.1% of the population and foreign-born persons were 5.3% of the population. Population density was 741.0 persons/sq mi, land area is 15.50 sq mi, and the FIPS code is 4862600. The median income for a household in the city was $29,218, the per capita income was $14,178, and the poverty rate was 41.1%.

== Point of interest ==
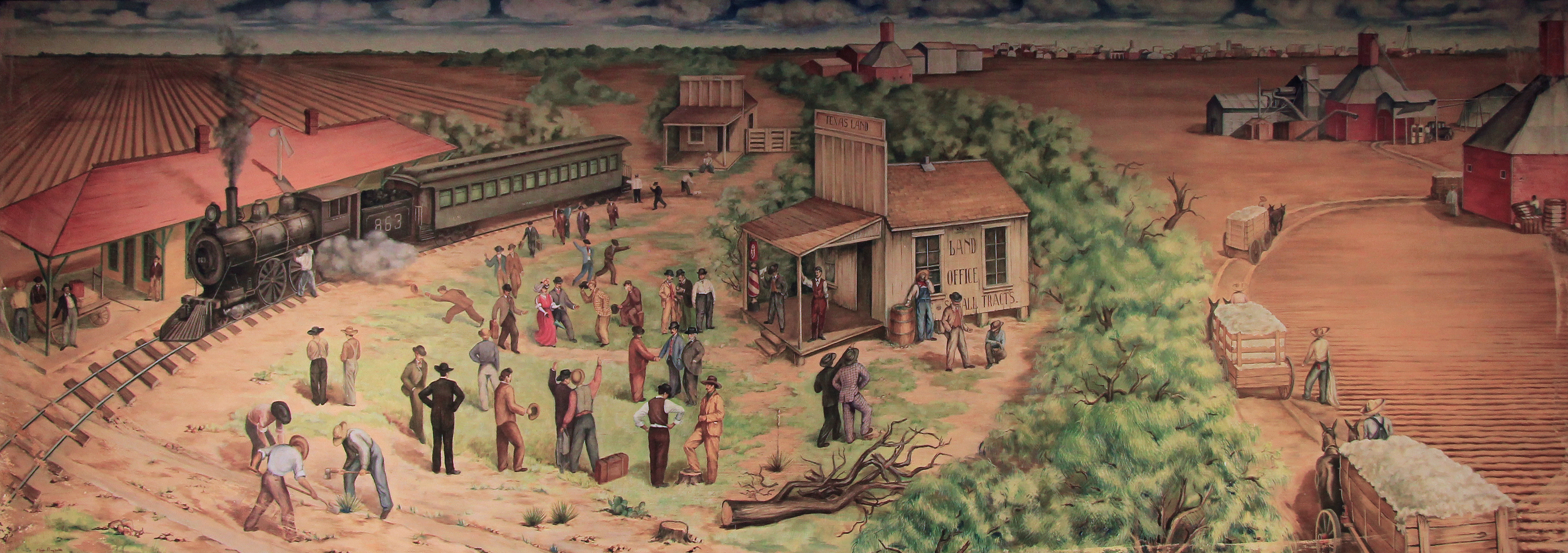
Alice Reynolds, The Founding and Subsequent Development of Surrounding Land of Robstown (1941)

The Robstown post office contains a mural, Founding and Subsequent Development of Robstown, Texas, painted in 1941 by Alice Reynolds. Federally commissioned murals were produced from 1934 to 1943 in the United States through the Section of Painting and Sculpture, later called the Section of Fine Arts, of the Treasury Department.

Robstown also has the Robstown Area Historical Museum, first opened in 1999, which contains many artifacts and walls dedicated to war veterans.

== Neighborhoods ==
Robstown is divided into several distinct neighborhoods. The Ashburn, Kissling area is located just east of Bluebonnet, next to the Robstown Early College High School. The area locally known as Bluebonnet is located in the northwest area of town, right next to Robstown Early College High School. The area locally known as Casa Blanca is considered to be south of the city and south of the Kansas City Railroad. San Pedro is on the westside, next to San Pedro Elementary School.

== Education ==
Robstown is served by the Robstown Independent School District.

Del Mar College is the designated community college for all of Nueces County.

Robstown ISD schools (As of 2025) include: Robstown Early College High School, Seale Junior High School, Robert Driscoll Jr. STEM Academy, Lotspeich Leadership Academy, and San Pedro Fine Arts Academy.

== Industry ==
Robstown is the site of a 1,200 acre lithium refinement plant owned and operated by Tesla. Ground was broken on the $375 million facility in 2023 and the plant began operation in December 2024. The plant is expected to employ 160 people and produce battery grade lithium hydroxide. Environmental concerns as to the expected water usage by the plant have been raised.

== Media ==
- Robstown Record (1926-1977)
- Nueces County Record Star, weekly, owned by GateHouse Media

== Notable people ==
- Damian Chapa, star of the famous Mexican American film Blood In, Blood Out
- Eddie Jackson, bassist for Seattle progressive metal band Queensrÿche
- Brooks Kieschnick, former MLB player for the Chicago Cubs, Cincinnati Reds, Colorado Rockies, and Milwaukee Brewers, was inducted into the College Baseball Hall of Fame
- Solomon P. Ortiz, former U.S. Representative for Texas's 27th congressional district
- Gene Upshaw, former NFL player for the Oakland Raiders and executive director of the National Football League Players Association (NFLPA), was inducted into the Pro Football Hall of Fame
- Marvin Upshaw, player for the Cleveland Browns, Kansas City Chiefs, and St. Louis Cardinals
