= List of NFL annual punting yards leaders =

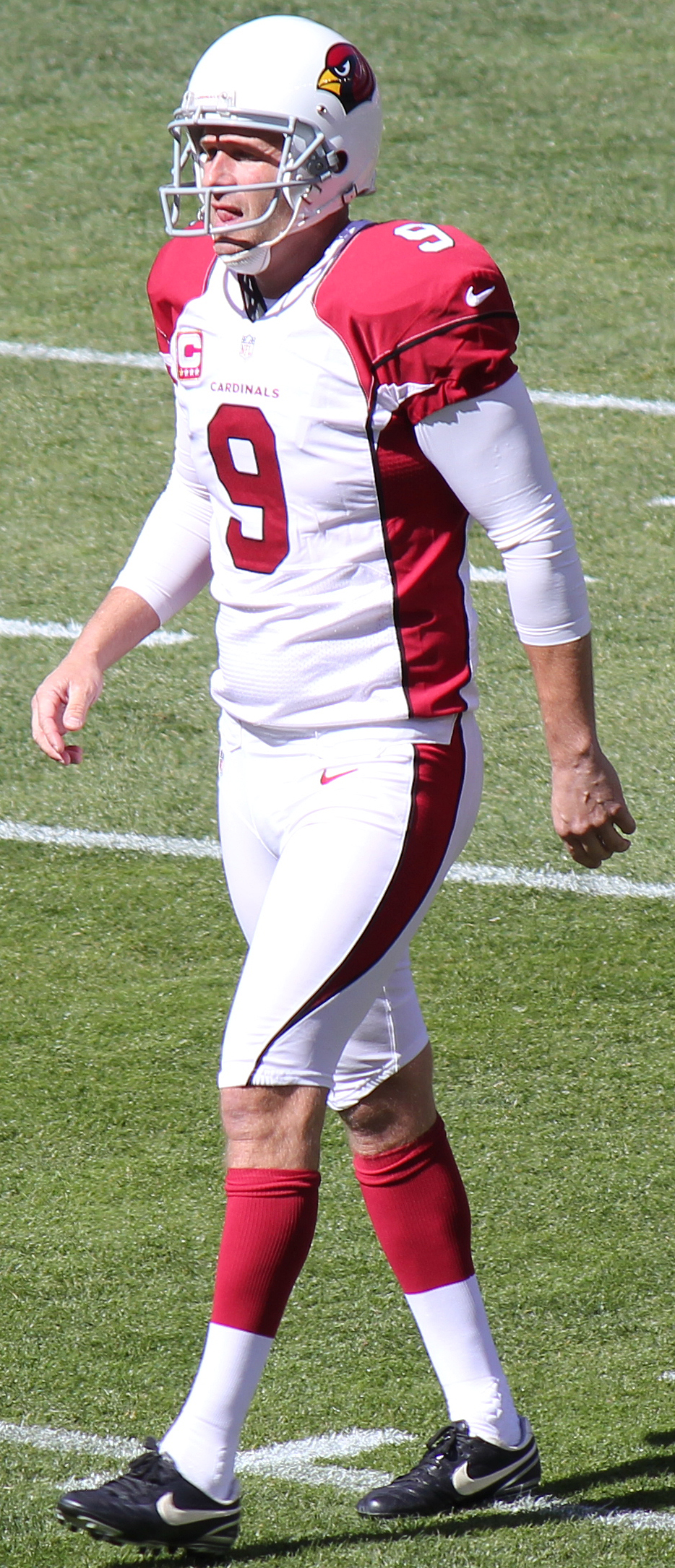
Dave Zastudil led the NFL in 2012, with a record of 5,209 punting yards.

Record-keeping for punting yards began in 1939, when Parker Hall led the National Football League (NFL) with 2,369 punting yards, while playing for the Cleveland Rams (now known as the Los Angeles Rams). Hall would lead the league in punting yards the following season as well, becoming the first player to accomplish the feat in consecutive seasons. Dave Zastudil holds the record for punting yards in a season; he set the record at 5,209 punting yards in 2012, while playing with the Arizona Cardinals.

Although many other players have been able to lead the league in two consecutive seasons, John James is the only player to have the led the league in three consecutive seasons (1976–1978). James and Shane Lechler share the record of most seasons leading the league in punting yards, with four each. James led the league in 1974, in addition to his aforementioned three-year stretch; he played with the Atlanta Falcons in all four of those seasons. Meanwhile, Lechler lead the league in 2003, 2008, and 2009 (while with the Oakland Raiders), and in 2017, while playing with the Houston Texans. Johnny Hekker was the most recent player to accomplish this feat, leading in 2015, while playing for the St. Louis Rams, and again in 2016, when the team relocated to Los Angeles.

Among punting yards performances that did not lead the league, Chad Stanley has the most with 4,720 for the Texans in 2002. Marquette King's 4,930 punting yards for the Oakland Raiders in 2014 is the most punting yards a player has had without setting the single-season record.

Sammy Baugh led the league in yards per punt five times in his career (1940–1943, 1945). Lechler is the only other player to lead the league in yards per punt four times (2003, 2004, 2007, 2009). Baugh's four consecutive years leading the league (1940–1943) is also notable; no other player has led the league more than twice consecutively. The most recent player to do so was Lechler in 2003 and 2004. Baugh set the record for yards per punt at 51.4 in 1940. The 50.0 yards per punt mark would not be reached again until Donnie Jones achieved the feat in 2008. Ryan Stonehouse would surpass Baugh's yards per punt record, setting the new benchmark at 53.1 in 2022.

== Total punting yards leaders ==
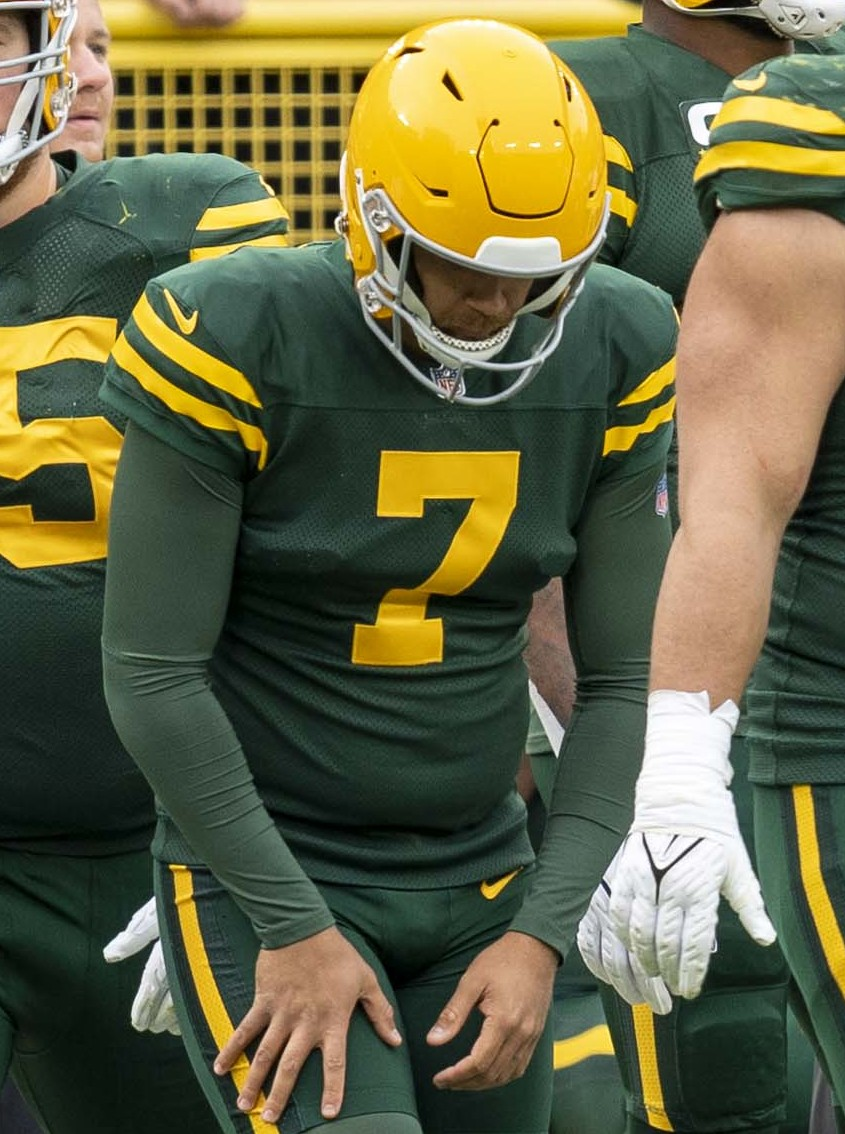
Corey Bojorquez is the most recent player to lead the league in punting yards in consecutive seasons (2024–2025).

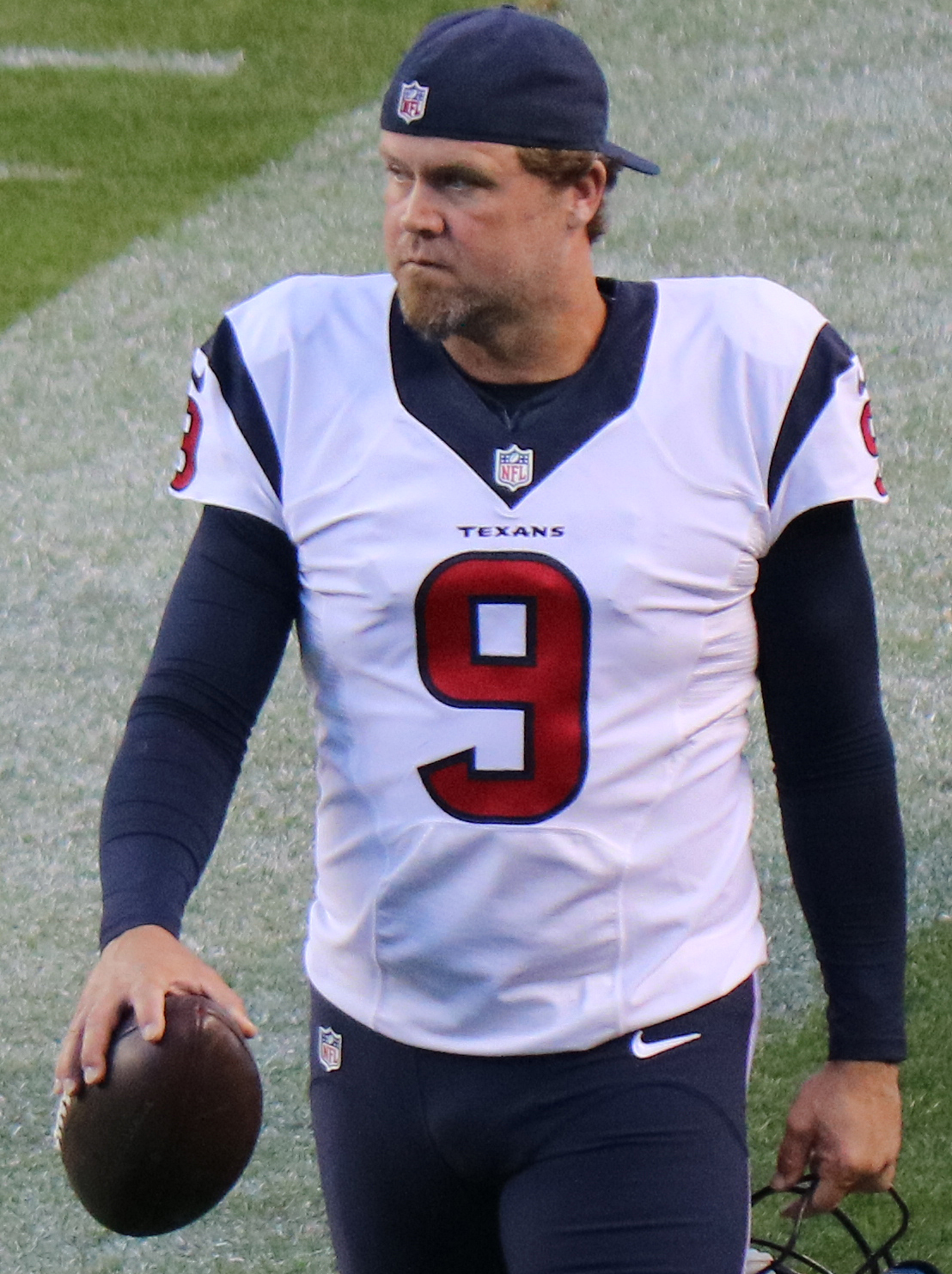
Shane Lechler led the league in punting yards for a tied record-fourth time in 2017.

The following is the season-by-season listing:

Denotes all-time NFL record
Denotes former NFL record

Year	Player	Yards	Team
1939	Parker Hall	2,369	Cleveland Rams
1940	Parker Hall (2)	2,489	Cleveland Rams
1941	Whizzer White	1,997	Detroit Lions
1942	Dean McAdams	2,158	Brooklyn Dodgers
1943	Sammy Baugh	2,295	Washington Redskins
1944	Len Younce	1,941	New York Giants
1945	Sid Tinsley	2,308	Pittsburgh Steelers
1946	Roy McKay	2,735	Green Bay Packers
1947	Howard Maley	3,731	Boston Yanks
1948	Jack Jacobs	2,782	Green Bay Packers
1949	Dick Poillon	2,697	Washington Redskins
1950	Adrian Burk	3,243	Baltimore Colts
1951	Horace Gillom	3,321	Cleveland Browns
1952	Tom Landry	3,363	New York Giants
1953	Pat Brady	3,752	Pittsburgh Steelers
1954	Max McGee	2,999	Green Bay Packers
1955	Tom Landry (2)	3,022	New York Giants
1956	Adrian Burk (2)	2,843	Philadelphia Eagles
1957	Jerry Norton	2,798	Philadelphia Eagles
1958	Don Chandler	2,859	New York Giants
1959	Max McGee (2)	2,716	Green Bay Packers
1960	Bobby Joe Green	2,829	Pittsburgh Steelers
1961	Jerry Norton (2)	3,802	St. Louis Cardinals
1962	Danny Villanueva	3,960	Los Angeles Rams
1963	Danny Villanueva (2)	3,678	Los Angeles Rams
1964	Pat Richter	3,749	Washington Redskins
1965	Frank Lambert	3,518	Pittsburgh Steelers
1966	Bobby Joe Green (2)	3,358	Chicago Bears
1967	Billy Lothridge	3,801	Atlanta Falcons
1968	Billy Lothridge (2)	3,324	Atlanta Falcons
1969	Pat Studstill	3,259	Los Angeles Rams
1970	Billy Van Heusen	3,732	Denver Broncos
1971	Bob Lee	3,515	Minnesota Vikings
1972	Don Cockroft	3,498	Cleveland Browns
1973	Jerrel Wilson	3,642	Kansas City Chiefs
1974	John James	3,891	Atlanta Falcons
1975	Tom Blanchard	3,776	New Orleans Saints
1976	John James (2)	4,253	Atlanta Falcons
1977	John James (3)	4,349	Atlanta Falcons
1978	John James (4)	4,227	Atlanta Falcons
1979	Dave Jennings	4,445	New York Giants
1980	Dave Jennings (2)	4,211	New York Giants
1981	Bob Parsons	4,531	Chicago Bears
1982	Bob Parsons (2)	2,394	Chicago Bears
1983	Rohn Stark	4,124	Baltimore Colts
1984	Jim Arnold	4,397	Kansas City Chiefs
1985	Rich Camarillo	3,953	New England Patriots
1986	John Teltschik	4,493	Philadelphia Eagles
1987	Dale Hatcher	3,140	Los Angeles Rams
1988	Jim Arnold (2)	4,110	Detroit Lions
1989	Bryan Wagner	3,817	Cleveland Browns
1990	Brian Hansen	3,752	New England Patriots
1991	Tommy Barnhardt	3,743	New Orleans Saints
1992	Rick Tuten	4,760	Seattle Seahawks
1993	Rick Tuten (2)	4,007	Seattle Seahawks
1994	Rich Camarillo (2)	4,115	Houston Oilers
1995	Brian Hansen (2)	4,090	New York Jets
1996	Mike Horan	4,289	New York Giants
1997	Brad Maynard	4,531	New York Giants
1998	Brad Maynard (2)	4,566	New York Giants
1999	Chris Gardocki	4,645	Cleveland Browns
2000	Chris Gardocki (2)	4,919	Cleveland Browns
2001	Todd Sauerbrun	4,419	Carolina Panthers
2002	Todd Sauerbrun (2)	4,735	Carolina Panthers
2003	Shane Lechler	4,503	Oakland Raiders
2004	Brad Maynard (3)	4,638	Chicago Bears
2005	Andy Lee	4,447	San Francisco 49ers
2006	Jason Baker	4,483	Carolina Panthers
2007	Andy Lee (2)	4,968	San Francisco 49ers
2008	Shane Lechler (2)	4,391	Oakland Raiders
2009	Shane Lechler (3)	4,909	Oakland Raiders
2010	Donnie Jones	4,276	St. Louis Rams
2011	Britton Colquitt	4,783	Denver Broncos
2012	Dave Zastudil	5,209	Arizona Cardinals
2013	Bryan Anger	4,338	Jacksonville Jaguars
2014	Marquette King	4,930	Oakland Raiders
2015	Johnny Hekker	4,601	St. Louis Rams
2016	Johnny Hekker (2)	4,343	Los Angeles Rams
2017	Shane Lechler (4)	4,507	Houston Texans
2018	Andy Lee (3)	4,568	Arizona Cardinals
2019	Lac Edwards	3,991	New York Jets
2020	Braden Mann	3,598	New York Jets
2021	Cameron Johnston	4,102	Houston Texans
2022	Ryan Stonehouse	4,779	Tennessee Titans
2023	Thomas Morstead	4,831	New York Jets
2024	Corey Bojorquez	4,387	Cleveland Browns
2025	Corey Bojorquez (2)	4,165	Cleveland Browns
Statistics gathered from Pro Football Reference.

== American Football League (AFL) ==
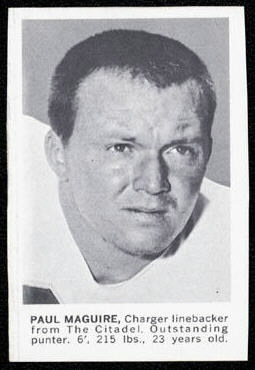
Paul Maguire was the only punter in the AFL to lead the league in punting three times and is one of just six punters to lead a league three times in pro football history.

Denotes all-time AFL record
Denotes former AFL record

Year	Player	Yards	Team
1960	Billy Atkins	3,468	Buffalo Bills
1961	Billy Atkins (2)	3,783	Buffalo Bills
1962	Paul Maguire	3,289	San Diego Chargers
1963	Jim Fraser	3,596	Denver Broncos
1964	Jerrel Wilson	3,326	Kansas City Chiefs
1965	Jim Norton	3,711	Houston Oilers
1966	Bob Scarpitto	3,480	Denver Broncos
1967	Bob Scarpitto (2)	4,713	Denver Broncos
1968	Paul Maguire (2)	4,175	Buffalo Bills
1969	Paul Maguire (3)	3,471	Buffalo Bills
Statistics gathered from Pro Football Reference.

== All-America Football Conference (AAFC) ==
Denotes all-time AAFC record

AAFC annual punting yards leaders by season
Season	Player	Yds	Team	Ref.
1946	Glenn Dobbs	3,826	Brooklyn Dodgers	
1947	Ernie Lewis	2,549	Chicago Rockets	
1948	Glenn Dobbs (2)	3,336	Los Angeles Dons	
1949	Tom Landry	2,249	New York Yankees	

== Most seasons leading the league ==
Count	Player	Seasons	Team(s)
4	John James	1974, 1976, 1977, 1978	Atlanta Falcons
4	Shane Lechler	2003, 2008, 2009, 2017	Oakland Raiders (3) / Houston Texans (1)
3	Tom Landry	1949, 1952, 1955	New York Yankees (1) / New York Giants (2)
3	Andy Lee	2005, 2007, 2018	San Francisco 49ers (2) / Arizona Cardinals (1)
3	Paul Maguire	1962, 1968, 1969	San Diego Chargers (1) / Buffalo Bills (2)
3	Brad Maynard	1997, 1998, 2004	New York Giants (2) / Chicago Bears (1)
2	Jim Arnold	1984, 1988	Kansas City Chiefs (1) / Detroit Lions (1)
2	Billy Atkins	1960, 1961	Buffalo Bills
2	Corey Bojorquez	2024, 2025	Cleveland Browns
2	Adrian Burk	1950, 1956	Baltimore Colts (1) / Philadelphia Eagles (1)
2	Rich Camarillo	1985, 1994	New England Patriots (1) / Houston Oilers (1)
2	Glenn Dobbs	1946, 1948	Brooklyn Dodgers (1) / Los Angeles Dons (1)
2	Chris Gardocki	1999, 2000	Cleveland Browns
2	Bobby Joe Green	1960, 1966	Pittsburgh Steelers (1) / Chicago Bears (1)
2	Parker Hall	1939, 1940	Cleveland Rams
2	Brian Hansen	1990, 1995	New England Patriots (1) / New York Jets (1)
2	Johnny Hekker	2015, 2016	St. Louis Rams (1) / Los Angeles Rams (1)
2	Dave Jennings	1979, 1980	New York Giants
2	Billy Lothridge	1967, 1968	Atlanta Falcons
2	Max McGee	1954, 1959	Green Bay Packers
2	Jerry Norton	1957, 1961	Philadelphia Eagles (1) / St. Louis Cardinals (1)
2	Bob Parsons	1981, 1982	Chicago Bears
2	Todd Sauerbrun	2001, 2002	Carolina Panthers
2	Bob Scarpitto	1966, 1967	Denver Broncos
2	Rick Tuten	1992, 1993	Seattle Seahawks
2	Danny Villanueva	1962, 1963	Los Angeles Rams

== Yards per punt leaders ==
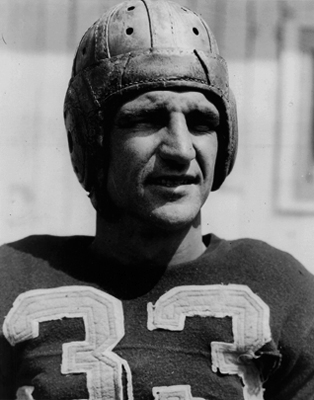
Sammy Baugh was a 5-time league leader in yards per punt, which is still the most in NFL history, with only one other player ever reaching four seasons leading in yards per punt. His record for yards per punt for a season of 51.4 lasted 82 years.

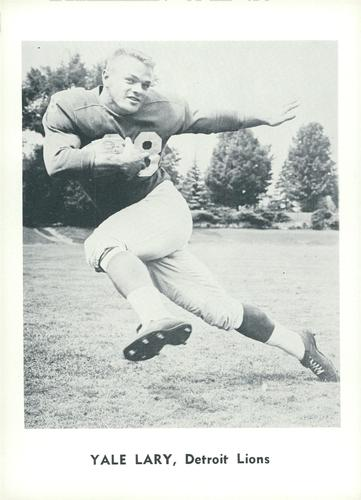
In 1963, Yale Lary became the second player to lead the league yards per punt for a third time.

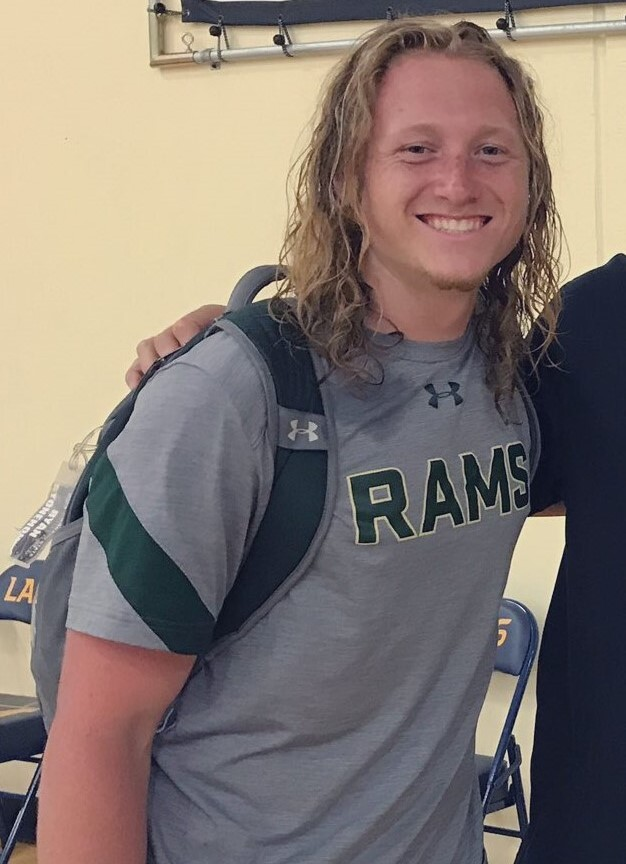
Ryan Stonehouse set the single-season record for yards per punt in 2022 and is the most recent yards per punt leader.

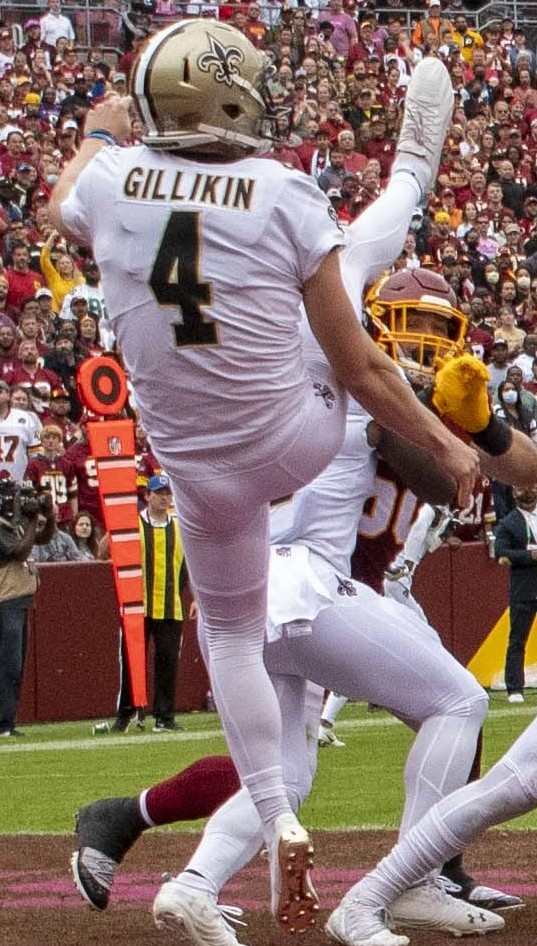
Blake Gillikin (pictured) along with Daniel Whelan are the two most recent punters to led the league in yards per punt.

The following is the season-by-season listing:

Key
^	Inducted into the Pro Football Hall of Fame
^	Active player
	Denotes all-time NFL record
	Denotes former NFL record

Year	Player	Yards	Team	Ref(s)
1939	Sid Luckman^	44.4	Chicago Bears	
1940	Sammy Baugh^	51.4	Washington Redskins	
1941	Sammy Baugh^ (2)	48.7	Washington Redskins	
1942	Sammy Baugh^ (3)	48.2	Washington Redskins	
1943 (Note: Pro Football Reference lists Frankie Sinkwich of the Detroit Lions as the 1943 yards per punt co-leader alongside Baugh. Sinkwich's 45.92 yards per punt is also slightly ahead of Baugh's 45.90 yards per punt, which would make him the sole leader. However, Sinkwich's 12 punts in 10 games does not meet the minimum requirement of 2.5 punts per team game that the NFL requires to qualify as a season statistical leader.)	Sammy Baugh^ (4)	45.9	Washington Redskins	
1944	Jack Banta	44.2	Philadelphia Eagles	
1945	Sammy Baugh^ (5)	43.3	Washington Redskins	
1946	Bob Cifers	45.6	Detroit Lions	
1947	George Gulyanics	44.8	Chicago Bears	
1948	Joe Muha	47.3	Philadelphia Eagles	
1949	George Gulyanics (2)	47.2	Chicago Bears	
1950	Fred Morrison	43.3	Chicago Bears	
1951	Horace Gillom	45.5	Cleveland Browns	
1952	Horace Gillom (2)	45.7	Cleveland Browns	
1953	Pat Brady	46.9	Pittsburgh Steelers	
1954	Pat Brady (2)	43.2	Pittsburgh Steelers	
1955	Norm Van Brocklin^	44.6	Los Angeles Rams	
1956	Horace Gillom (3)	44.7	Cleveland Browns	
1957	Larry Barnes	47.1	San Francisco 49ers	
1958	Sam Baker	45.4	Washington Redskins	
1959	Yale Lary^	47.1	Detroit Lions	
1960	Jerry Norton	45.6	St. Louis Cardinals	
1961	Yale Lary^ (2)	48.4	Detroit Lions	
1962	Tommy Davis	45.6	San Francisco 49ers	
1963	Yale Lary^ (3)	48.9	Detroit Lions	
1964	Bobby Walden	46.4	Minnesota Vikings	
1965	Gary Collins	46.7	Cleveland Browns	
1966	David Lee	45.6	Baltimore Colts	
1967	Pat Studstill	44.5	Detroit Lions	
1968	Billy Lothridge	44.3	Atlanta Falcons	
1969	David Lee	45.3	Baltimore Colts	
1970	Dave Lewis	46.2	Cincinnati Bengals	
1971 (Note: Both Dave Lewis and Jerrel Wilson averaged 44.8 yards per punt in 1971. However, Lewis' average (44.847 based on 72 punts for 3,229 yards) slightly edges Wilson's (44.75 based on 64 punts for 2,864 yards).)	Dave Lewis (2)	44.8	Cincinnati Bengals	
1972	Jerrel Wilson	44.8	Kansas City Chiefs	
1973	Jerrel Wilson (2)	45.5	Kansas City Chiefs	
1974	Ray Guy^	42.2	Oakland Raiders	
1975	Ray Guy^ (2)	43.8	Oakland Raiders	
1976	Marv Bateman	42.8	Buffalo Bills	
1977	Ray Guy^ (3)	43.3	Oakland Raiders	
1978	Pat McInally	43.1	Cincinnati Bengals	
1979	Bob Grupp	43.6	Kansas City Chiefs	
1980	Dave Jennings	44.8	New York Giants	
1981	Pat McInally (2)	45.4	Cincinnati Bengals	
1982	Luke Prestridge	45.0	Denver Broncos	
1983	Rohn Stark	45.3	Baltimore Colts	
1984	Jim Arnold	44.9	Kansas City Chiefs	
1985	Rohn Stark (2)	45.9	Indianapolis Colts	
1986	Rohn Stark (3)	45.2	Indianapolis Colts	
1987	Rick Donnelly	44.0	Atlanta Falcons	
1988	Harry Newsome	45.4	Pittsburgh Steelers	
1989	Rich Camarillo	43.4	Phoenix Cardinals	
1990	Greg Montgomery	45.0	Houston Oilers	
1991	Reggie Roby	45.7	Miami Dolphins	
1992	Greg Montgomery (2)	46.9	Houston Oilers	
1993	Greg Montgomery (3)	45.6	Houston Oilers	
1994	Sean Landeta	44.8	Los Angeles Rams	
1995	Rick Tuten	45.0	Seattle Seahawks	
1996	John Kidd	46.3	Miami Dolphins	
1997	Mark Royals	45.9	New Orleans Saints	
1998	Craig Hentrich	47.2	Tennessee Oilers	
1999	Tom Rouen	46.5	Denver Broncos	
2000	Darren Bennett	46.2	San Diego Chargers	
2001	Todd Sauerbrun	47.5	Carolina Panthers	
2002	Todd Sauerbrun (2)	45.5	Carolina Panthers	
2003	Shane Lechler	46.9	Oakland Raiders	
2004	Shane Lechler (2)	46.7	Oakland Raiders	
2005 (Note: Both Brian Moorman and Shane Lechler averaged 45.7 yards per punt. Moorman's 45.68 yards per punt (based on 68 punts for 3,242 yards) slightly edges Lechler's 45.66 average (based on 82 punts for 3,744 yards).)	Brian Moorman	45.7	Buffalo Bills	
2006	Mat McBriar	48.2	Dallas Cowboys	
2007	Shane Lechler (3)	49.1	Oakland Raiders	
2008	Donnie Jones	50.0	St. Louis Rams	
2009	Shane Lechler (4)	51.1	Oakland Raiders	
2010	Mat McBriar (2)	48.2	Dallas Cowboys	
2011	Andy Lee	50.9	San Francisco 49ers	
2012	Brandon Fields	50.2	Miami Dolphins	
2013	Marquette King	48.9	Oakland Raiders	
2014 (Note: Both Tress Way and Bryan Anger averaged 47.5 yards per punt. Way's 47.52 yards per punt (based on 77 punts for 3,659 yards) slightly edged Anger's 47.49 average (based on 94 punts for 4,464 yards).)	Tress Way^	47.5	Washington Redskins	
2015	Johnny Hekker	47.9	St. Louis Rams	
2016	Pat McAfee	49.3	Indianapolis Colts	
2017	Brett Kern	49.7	Tennessee Titans	
2018	Andy Lee (2)	48.6	Arizona Cardinals	
2019	Tress Way^ (2)	49.6	Washington Redskins	
2020	Corey Bojorquez^	50.8	Buffalo Bills	
2021	A. J. Cole III^	50.0	Las Vegas Raiders	
2022	Ryan Stonehouse	53.1	Tennessee Titans	
2023	Ryan Stonehouse (2)	53.1	Tennessee Titans	
2024	Jack Fox^	51.0	Detroit Lions	
2025	Blake Gillikin ^	51.7	Arizona Cardinals	
2025	Daniel Whelan^	51.7	Green Bay Packers	

== Most seasons leading the league ==
Count	Player	Seasons	Team(s)
5	Sammy Baugh	1940–1943, 1945	Washington Redskins
4	Shane Lechler	2003, 2004, 2007, 2009	Oakland Raiders
3	Greg Montgomery	1990, 1992, 1993	Houston Oilers
3	Horace Gillom	1951, 1952, 1956	Cleveland Browns
3	Ray Guy	1974, 1975, 1977	Oakland Raiders
3	Rohn Stark	1983, 1985, 1986	Baltimore Colts (1) / Indianapolis Colts (2)
3	Yale Lary	1959, 1961, 1963	Detroit Lions
2	Andy Lee	2011, 2018	San Francisco 49ers (1) / Arizona Cardinals (1)
2	Dave Lewis	1970, 1971	Cincinnati Bengals
2	George Gulyanics	1947, 1949	Chicago Bears
2	Jerrel Wilson	1972, 1973	Kansas City Chiefs
2	Mat McBriar	2006, 2010	Dallas Cowboys
2	Pat Brady	1953, 1954	Pittsburgh Steelers
2	Pat McInally	1978, 1981	Cincinnati Bengals
2	Ryan Stonehouse	2022, 2023	Tennessee Titans
2	Todd Sauerbrun	2001, 2002	Carolina Panthers
2	Tress Way	2014, 2019	Washington Redskins

== Highest single-seasons ==
=== Total punting yards ===
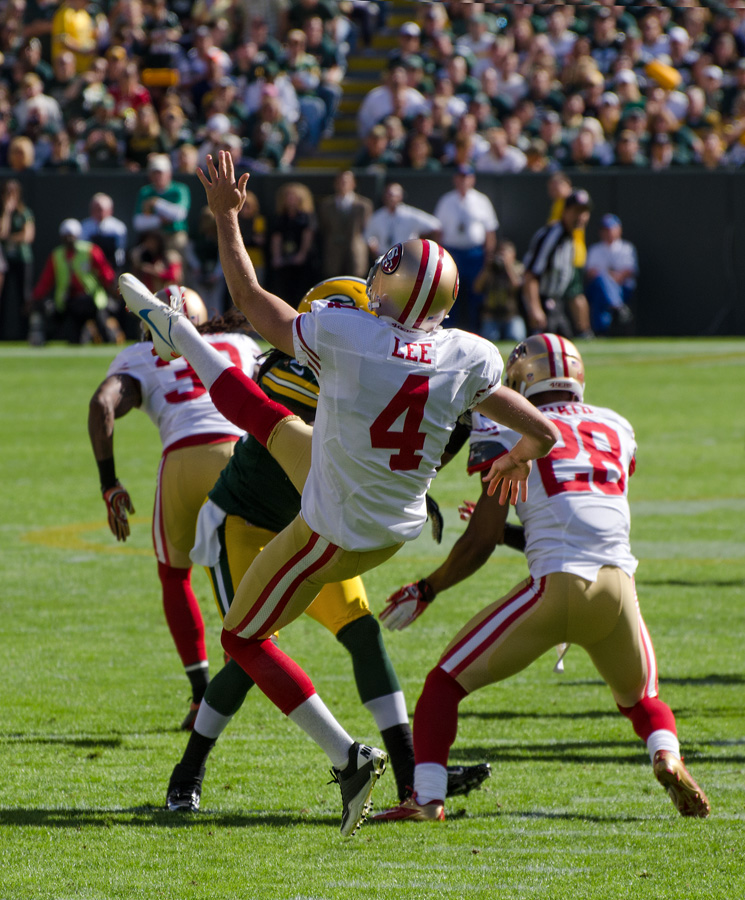
Andy Lee has three single-seasons of over 4,500 punting yards.

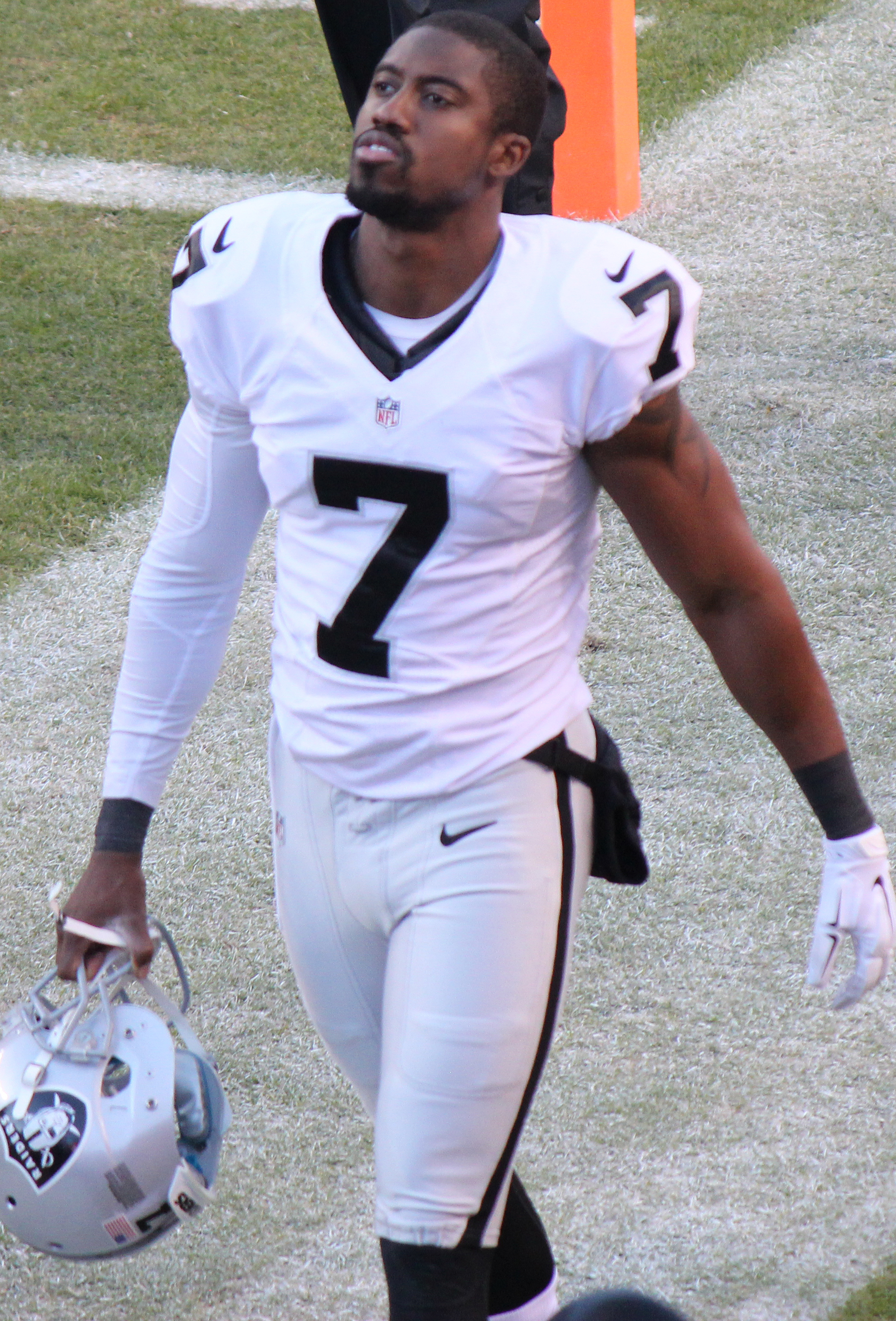
Marquette King led the league in punting yards in 2014, with 4,930, the third-most ever in a single-season.

The following list displays the 25 highest single-season punting yards figures in NFL history. Unless otherwise noted, the listed players led the respective season with their performances.

Denotes all-time NFL record
Denotes former NFL record
Denotes non-league leader

Rank	Player	Team	Season	Yards
1	Dave Zastudil	Arizona Cardinals	2012	5,209
2	Andy Lee	San Francisco 49ers	2007	4,960
3	Marquette King	Oakland Raiders	2014	4,930
4	Chris Gardocki	Cleveland Browns	2000	4,919
5	Shane Lechler	Oakland Raiders	2009	4,909
6	Thomas Morstead	New York Jets	2023	4,831
7	Britton Colquitt	Denver Broncos	2011	4,783
8	Ryan Stonehouse	Tennessee Titans	2022	4,779
9	Rick Tuten	Seattle Seahawks	1992	4,760
10	Todd Sauerbrun	Carolina Panthers	2002	4,735
11	Chad Stanley	Houston Texans	2002	4,720
12	Bob Scarpitto	Denver Broncos	1967	4,713
13	Andy Lee	San Francisco 49ers	2009	4,711
14	Johnny Hekker	Los Angeles Rams	2016	4,680
15	Donnie Jones	St. Louis Rams	2011	4,652
16	Chris Gardocki	Cleveland Browns	1999	4,645
17	Brad Maynard	Chicago Bears	2004	4,638
18	Johnny Hekker	St. Louis Rams	2015	4,601
19	Bryce Baringer	New England Patriots	2023	4,598
20	Andy Lee	Arizona Cardinals	2018	4,568
21	Brad Maynard	New York Giants	1998	4,566
22	Tom Tupa	Washington Redskins	2004	4,544
23	Brad Maynard	New York Giants	1997	4,531
23	Bob Parsons	Chicago Bears	1981	4,531
25	Sean Landeta	Philadelphia Eagles	1999	4,524
Statistics accurate through the 2026 season.

== See also ==
- List of NFL career punting yards leaders
- List of NFL career punts leaders
