= Jerrel Wilson =

American football player (1941–2005)

No. 44, 4
- Position: Punter

Personal information
- Born: October 4, 1941; New Orleans, Louisiana, U.S.
- Died: April 9, 2005 (aged 63); Bronson, Texas, U.S.
- Listed height: 6 ft 2 in (1.88 m)
- Listed weight: 222 lb (101 kg)

Career information
- High school: Murphy (Mobile, Alabama)
- College: Southern Miss
- NFL draft: 1963: 17th round, 225th overall pick
- AFL draft: 1963: 11th round, 88th overall pick

Career history
- Kansas City Chiefs (1963–1977); New England Patriots (1978)

Awards and highlights
- Super Bowl champion (IV); AFL champion (1967, 1969); 3× Pro Bowl (1970–1972); NFL punting yards leader (1973); AFL punting yards leader (1964); AFL All-Time Team; NFL 1970s All-Decade Team; Kansas City Chiefs Hall of Fame

Career NFL statistics
- Punts: 1,072
- Punting yards: 46,139
- Punting average: 43
- Longest punt: 72
- Stats at Pro Football Reference

Jerrel Douglas Wilson (October 4, 1941 – April 9, 2005), nicknamed "Thunderfoot", was an American professional football punter who played for 16 seasons, 15 of them with the Kansas City Chiefs, in the American Football League (AFL) and the National Football League (NFL). Wilson played college football for the Southern Miss Golden Eagles. He was selected to three Pro Bowls. Wilson was elected to the Chiefs Hall of Fame in 1988. He is the only punter to be a leader in punting yards for a season in multiple leagues. Both as a college and professional player, Wilson was known for his adeptness in punting to give his team's defense an advantage in field position.

Wilson played in Super Bowls I and IV. He holds the career Super Bowl record for highest punting average for players with more than 10 punts (46.5 yards per punt). He was the first player in AFL/NFL history to reach 1,000 punts. Wilson is tied with Sammy Baugh for most seasons leading the league in punting average. In 2019, Wilson was among the final four punters considered for inclusion as one of the two greatest punters on the NFL's list of 100 greatest players in its first 100 years. The Pro Football Hall of Fame named him as the first-team punter on the AFL's All-Time Team. He was one of two punters selected to the NFL's 1970s All-Decade Team. Wilson was selected as a first- or second-team all-league player in both the AFL and NFL.

== Early life ==
Wilson was born on October 4, 1941, in New Orleans. Wilson said he was adopted at less than one-year old by Nan and Douglas Wilson. At the time of his death, it was also reported he was adopted at age six. Wilson did not learn he was adopted until he was 10 years old. He was extremely upset upon learning of his adoption and went to question his adoptive parents, who explained to him that they had specifically chosen to adopt him among all children. He was their only child. Wilson was devoted to his parents and appreciated the life he lived with them.

Douglas Wilson worked in Gulf Oil's land-leasing department and during Wilson's youth the family frequently moved. They only lived in New Orleans for a short time, later moving to East Texas, Alabama, Mississippi and back to Alabama. Wilson first learned how to punt a football as a fifth grader in Aberdeen, Mississippi, from Mississippi State University punter L. M. "Molly" Halbert.

Wilson attended Brookhaven High School in Brookhaven, Mississippi and spent three years at Murphy High School in Mobile, Alabama. He was only 5 ft 1 in (1.55 m) 110 lb (49.9 kg) as a sophomore at Murphy, but grew to 6 ft 1 in (1.85 m) 165 lb (74.8 kg) by his senior year there. He played one season of high school football (as a senior), but practiced punting in his back yard over the years. As a senior, he was the team's punter and played as an offensive tackle and linebacker.

== College career ==
After graduating high school, Wilson and his family moved back to Mississippi. He obtained a scholarship from Pearl River Junior College in Mississippi. He tried out for the school's football team and made the team at center in his freshman year. He became Pearl River's punter in his second season there. During his two years at Pearl River, the team only lost one game, was state junior college champion twice, was ranked first among junior colleges nationally in 1961 with a 10–0 record, and won the Hospitality Bowl both years. He was an All-American at Pearl River.

In 1961, Wilson went on to attend the University of Southern Mississippi. Wilson was both a placekicker and punter at Southern Mississippi. Wilson played center in his first year at Southern Mississippi. As a senior the next year, now weighing 220 lb (99.8 kg) he was moved to fullback, averaging 5.2 yards per carry for 229 rushing yards and three touchdowns. He also played linebacker on defense at Southern Mississippi. Wilson's longest punt at Southern Mississippi was credited as 69 yards. With Southern Mississippi at its own 11-yard line in one game, Wilson also reportedly punted the ball into the opposing team's end zone for 89 yards; though he was not officially credited with an 89-yard punt. He was timed as running the 100–yard dash at 10.1 seconds while at Southern Mississippi.

His Southern Mississippi Hall of Fame remembrance states that Wilson averaged 38 yards per punt on 24 punts in 1961, and that his punts stayed in the air for such a lengthy duration that the majority of the time the other teams' punt returners had to settle for a fair catch. Only 10 of Wilson's 1961 punts were returned, and these for a total of only 66 yards. As a senior in 1962, he punted 33 times for a 37.6 yards per punt average, with less than half of his punts being returned. Over his two-year career, less than 37 percent of his punts were returned at all, and the return average against him was eight yards per return. Wilson was also adept and placing his punts inside the opposing team's ten-yard line, providing Southern Mississippi's defense with a field position advantage. (It has also been reported that Wilson averaged 42.3 yards as a punter at Southern Mississippi.)

In 1961, Southern Mississippi had an 8–2 record and in 1962 the team was 9–1. United Press International selected Southern Mississippi as NCAA College Division National Champions in 1962.

== Professional career ==
The Los Angeles Rams selected Wilson in the 17th round of the 1963 NFL draft, 225th overall. The Dallas Texans selected Wilson in the 11th round of the 1963 AFL draft, 88th overall. In December 1962, Wilson signed a contract to play for the Texans. He chose the Texans so he could be close to his parents in Texas. However, in March 1963 the team moved to Kansas City, Missouri, becoming the Kansas City Chiefs. In that same draft, the Texans/Chiefs selected future Hall of Fame members Buck Buchanan (with the first overall selection in the draft), Bobby Bell (seventh round, 56th overall), and future Chiefs Hall of Honor member Ed Budde (first round, eighth overall pick).

As a rookie in 1963, Wilson was the Chiefs' starting punter. He punted 61 times, averaging 43.1 yards per punt. Wilson had a 72-yard punt during the season, which was the longest punt in the AFL that year. Wilson also had nine rushing attempts for 41 yards and two pass receptions as a running back that season. Chiefs' head coach Hank Stram thought Wilson was athletic enough to play at running back or linebacker, but believed his role as the team's punter was too important to let Wilson play any other positions; though Stram did allow Wilson to play on special teams on kickoff coverage and returns, and he recovered five fumbles over his career as a special teams player.

In 1964, Wilson averaged 42.6 yards per punt on 78 punts, and led the AFL with 3,326 total punting yards. Wilson led the AFL in average yards per punt in 1965 (45.4) and 1968 (45.1). He was third in 1969 at 44.4 yards per punt, .2 yards per punt behind the AFL leader (Dennis Partee). In 1966, the AFL named him second-team All-AFL. In 1968, The Sporting News selected Wilson first-team All-AFL and the Pro Football Writers of America named him second-team All-NFL/AFL.

In Wilson's first NFL season, after the AFL/NFL merger in the 1970 season, he was third in yards per punt (44.9). In 1971, he averaged 44.8 yards per punt, statistically just behind NFL leader Dave Lewis who reportedly averaged 44.9 or 44.8 yards per punt. Wilson led the NFL in yards per punt the next two seasons. In 1972 he averaged 44.8 yards per punt, and in 1973, Wilson had a career-high 45.5 yards per punt average; while also leading the NFL in total punting yards that season.

Wilson was selected to play in the Pro Bowl as the American Football Conference's (AFC) punter from 1970 to 1972. In 1971 and 1972, the Pro Football Writers of America and Pro Football Weekly named Wilson first-team All-Pro; and the Newspaper Enterprise Association named him second-team All Pro in 1972. The Sporting News named Wilson first-team All-AFC in 1971 and 1972. His Pro Bowl streak was broken in 1973 by fellow Southern Mississippi graduate and future Hall of Fame punter Ray Guy. After the 1973 season, Wilson never averaged more than 42 yards per punt.

Wilson holds the career Super Bowl record for average yards per punt (46.5) among punters with at least 10 punts in Super Bowl games. After defeating the Buffalo Bills 31–7 in the 1966 AFL Championship Game, where Wilson punted six times, averaging 42.3 yards per punt, the Chiefs played in the first AFL-NFL World Championship Game, later officially known as the Super Bowl. The Chiefs lost to the Green Bay Packers, 35–10. Wilson punted seven times in Super Bowl I, averaging 45.3 yards per punt, with a long punt of 61 yards. The Chiefs won the 1969 AFL Championship Game over the Oakland Raiders, 17–7. Wilson punted eight times, averaging 42.9 yards per punt, with a long of 56 yards. The Chiefs went on to win Super Bowl IV over the Minnesota Vikings, 23–7. Wilson punted four times, with an average of 48.5 yards per punt and a long punt of 59 yards in that game. He averaged 43.4 yards per punt over eight playoff games during his career.

Wilson had four career punts of 70 or more yards, including his league leading 72-yard punt as a rookie in 1963. Wilson was also a reserve running back for the Chiefs early in his career. During his career, Wilson rushed for 53 yards on 22 carries spread out over seven seasons. Almost half of his carries came as a rookie in 1963 (nine). Stram used him as a reserve running back in a 1968 game against the Denver Broncos because of injuries to the Chiefs' running backs, though Wilson was not physically prepared to play running back at that point in his career. Wilson was manhandled by the Bronco's Rich "Tombstone" Jackson, and gained one yard on five carries in the game. He also was tackled for a safety in that game. In addition to the nickname "Thunderfoot", Wilson was also known to his Chiefs' teammates as "Duck".

=== Final seasons ===
In July 1977, Wilson publicly asked for a trade to the Houston Oilers to be closer to his ailing adoptive parents. They lived on a 240-acre ranch near Huntsville, Texas. His mother had undergone cancer surgery and his father had a heart attack a few days later. The Oilers would not meet the Chiefs' trade demands and Wilson played for the Chiefs in 1977, averaging a then career-low 39.9 yards per punt. Wilson was traded to the Oilers in the spring of 1978 for a conditional sixth round draft pick, if Wilson made the team. Wilson was competing against the 23-year old Chris Parsley, who had been the Oilers' punter in 1977. Wilson's father died on August 6, 1978, and the Oilers released him on August 29. Wilson believed the Oilers choose Parsley because he was younger and lower salaried, but Oilers' coach Bum Phillips denied that age was an issue in selecting his punter.

In early September 1978, the New England Patriots' coach Chuck Fairbanks brought Wilson in to training camp to compete for the Patriots' punting position. Fairbanks selected Wilson over two other punters in training camp. Wilson played his final professional season for the Patriots, averaging a career-low 35.6 yards per punt.

== Legacy and honors ==
Wilson was given the nickname "Thunderfoot" for his "booming punts". He modeled his kicking style on a golf swing, describing his punting form as "I put my hips, knees, everything into it". He said, "The way I attack the ball, every time I hit it, I try to bust it", except when he was near the 50–yard line. In those situations, "Then I try to hang it high". Wilson averaged 42.4 yards per punt for the 1970s, third most for all punters with at least 100 punts in the era.

Hall of Fame teammate linebacker Willie Lanier said that "The excellence of his talent was easy for everyone to see . . . Jerrel was a big part of our success. He would always give us a boost when it came to field position. That made the job of the defense that much easier". Chiefs' Hall of Fame head coach Hank Stram said that Wilson "made other people aware of how important the kicking game was at a time when special teams were not given special consideration. . . . I'm prejudiced, but he's the best punter I ever saw. He'll go down in history as the best kicker in the NFL". Wilson attributed much of his success to Stram's emphasis on the importance of special teams (including kickers and punters). Wilson also gave credit to his long snapper, Hall of Fame linebacker Bobby Bell, whom Wilson considered the greatest long snapper in football.

Wilson is tied with Sammy Baugh for the NFL record for most seasons leading the league in punting average with four (1965, 1968, 1972, 1973). Wilson was the first player in AFL/NFL history with 1,000 punts, and he still ranks 19th all-time in punts (through 2025). At the time he retired in 1978, he had the most punting yards in AFL/NFL history, and was tied for eighth all-time in yards per punt. Wilson is tied with fellow punter Dustin Colquitt for longest tenured players in Chiefs' franchise history (15 seasons). In 15 years with the Chiefs, only three of his punts were returned for touchdowns, and none between 1967 and 1976; something he considered one of his most significant accomplishments. He retired with multiple team records including a franchise-record 1,014 punts during his career, highest average yardage in a career with 43.6, in a season with 46.1, in a game with 56.5.

In December 2019, Wilson was named as a finalist in the special teams category of the NFL 100th Anniversary Team celebrating the best players of the first 100 years of the league. He was one of four punters (Ray Guy, Yale Larry and Shane Lechler) being considered as the greatest punters in the NFL’s 100-year history. The Pro Football Hall of Fame named Wilson to the American Football League's first-team All-Time Team for the 1960s. He and Guy were the two punters named to the NFL’s 1970s All-Decade Team by the Hall of Fame, Wilson being named to the second team. In 1988, Wilson was inducted into the Chiefs Hall of Honor. In 1973, he was inducted into the University of Southern Mississippi's Sports Hall of Fame. In 1989, he was inducted into the Pearl River Community College Athletics Hall of Fame. He is also a member of the Mississippi Sports Hall of Fame.

== Personal life and death ==
During his playing career, in the off seasons Wilson resided in Kansas City with his family and worked for the Kansas City Life Insurance Company in its management and training division. Wilson also had a ranch in Huntsville, Texas. After retiring from football, he worked in various water related fields, such as fishing, selling boats and operating a marina.

Wilson's son Sean Wilson was the punter for Texas A&M University from 1987 to 1990.

Wilson died of cancer on April 9, 2005, in Bronson, Texas.
