= John James (American football) =

American football player (born 1949)

No. 6
- Position: Punter

Personal information
- Born: January 21, 1949 (age 77); Panama City, Florida, U.S.
- Listed height: 6 ft 3 in (1.91 m)
- Listed weight: 197 lb (89 kg)

Career information
- High school: Gainesville (FL)
- College: Florida
- NFL draft: 1972: undrafted

Career history
- Atlanta Falcons (1972–1981); Detroit Lions (1982); Houston Oilers (1982–1984)

Awards and highlights
- 2× Second-team All-Pro (1976, 1977); 3× Pro Bowl (1975–1977); 4× NFL punting yards leader (1974, 1976-1978); University of Florida Athletic Hall of Fame

Career NFL statistics
- Punts: 1,083
- Punting yards: 43,992
- Punt average: 40.6
- Stats at Pro Football Reference

John Wilbur James, Jr. (born January 21, 1949) is an American former professional football player who was a punter for 13 seasons in the National Football League (NFL) during the 1970s and 1980s. James played college football for the Florida Gators, and thereafter, he played in the NFL for the Atlanta Falcons, the Detroit Lions and the Houston Oilers. James led the league in punting yards four times, a record since tied by Shane Lechler.

== Early life ==
James was born in Panama City, Florida in 1949. James has three older sisters.

== College career ==
James attended the University of Florida in Gainesville, where he was a walk-on punter for the Gators teams under coaches Ray Graves and Doug Dickey from 1969 to 1971. He was the Gators' starting punter in 1970 and 1971, and kicked fifty-seven punts for an average distance of 40.3 yards during his senior year in 1971. James graduated from Florida with a bachelor's degree in 1971, and was inducted into the University of Florida Athletic Hall of Fame as a "Gator Great" in 1978.

== Professional career ==
James played in the NFL from 1972 to 1984 for three teams: the Atlanta Falcons (ten years), the Detroit Lions (three games) and the Houston Oilers (three years). He reached the peak of his profession, being selected three times for the Pro Bowl, an NFL all-star game pitting the best players from the American Football Conference (AFC) against the best of the National Football Conference (NFC). James finished his thirteen-season NFL career with a total of 1,083 punts for 43,992 yards and an average distance of 40.6 yards.

== NFL career statistics ==
Legend
	Led the league
**Bold**	Career high

=== Regular season ===
Year	Team	Punting									
Year	Team	GP	Punts	Yds	Net Yds	Lng	Avg	Net Avg	Blk	Ins20	TB
1972	ATL	14	61	2,609	2,310	59	**42.8**	37.9	0	-	3
1973	ATL	14	63	2,682	2,397	72	42.6	**38.0**	0	-	5
1974	ATL	14	96	3,891	3,093	65	40.5	31.9	**1**	-	7
1975	ATL	14	89	3,696	3,047	**75**	41.5	33.9	**1**	-	**13**
1976	ATL	14	101	4,253	3,653	67	42.1	36.2	0	**28**	12
1977	ATL	14	105	**4,349**	3,570	61	41.4	34.0	0	19	**13**
1978	ATL	**16**	**109**	4,227	**3,742**	57	38.8	34.0	**1**	24	9
1979	ATL	**16**	83	3,296	2,957	62	39.7	35.2	**1**	12	4
1980	ATL	**16**	79	3,087	2,707	59	39.1	34.3	0	25	7
1981	ATL	**16**	87	3,543	2,866	62	40.7	32.6	**1**	13	5
1982	DET	2	12	481	404	50	40.1	33.7	0	3	2
1982	HOU	5	31	1,260	1,062	56	40.6	34.3	0	4	2
1983	HOU	**16**	79	3,136	2,622	53	39.7	32.8	**1**	12	8
1984	HOU	**16**	88	3,482	2,764	55	39.6	31.4	0	20	5
Career		187	1,083	43,992	37,194	75	40.6	34.2	6	160	95

=== Playoffs ===
Year	Team	Punting									
Year	Team	GP	Punts	Yds	Net Yds	Lng	Avg	Net Avg	Blk	Ins20	TB
1978	ATL	**2**	**13**	**457**	**358**	**49**	35.2	27.5	0	1	**2**
1980	ATL	1	4	144	148	40	**36.0**	**37.0**	0	**2**	0
Career		3	17	601	506	49	35.4	29.8	0	3	2

== Life after the NFL ==
James is the father of five children, Helen James, Scott James, Matthew James, Susanna James, and Rose James and grandfather of seven. He held the position of executive director of Gator Boosters, Inc. at the University of Florida from 1986 to 2012, overseeing the booster fund-raising operation to fund athletic scholarships for Gator athletes.

== See also ==
- History of the Atlanta Falcons
- List of Detroit Lions players
- List of University of Florida alumni
- List of University of Florida Athletic Hall of Fame members
