= Todd Sauerbrun =

American football player (born 1973)

No. 16, 5, 10, 18
- Position: Punter

Personal information
- Born: January 4, 1973 (age 53); Setauket, New York, U.S.
- Listed height: 5 ft 10 in (1.78 m)
- Listed weight: 215 lb (98 kg)

Career information
- High school: Ward Melville (East Setauket, New York)
- College: West Virginia
- NFL draft: 1995: 2nd round, 56th overall pick

Career history
- Chicago Bears (1995–1999); Kansas City Chiefs (2000); Carolina Panthers (2001–2004); Denver Broncos (2005–2006); New England Patriots (2006); Denver Broncos (2007); Florida Tuskers (2009)

Awards and highlights
- 2× First-team All-Pro (2001, 2002); 2× Second-team All-Pro (1996, 2003); 3× Pro Bowl (2001–2003); 2× NFL punting yards leader (2001, 2002); PFW Golden Toe Award (2001); Unanimous All-American (1994); Big East Special Teams Player of the Year (1994); 3× First-team All-Big East (1992–1994)

Career NFL statistics
- Punts: 889
- Punting yards: 39,208
- Punting average: 44.1
- Stats at Pro Football Reference

Todd Scott Sauerbrun (/ˈsaʊ.ərbrən/; born January 4, 1973) is an American former professional football player who was a punter in the National Football League (NFL) for 13 seasons. He played college football for the West Virginia Mountaineers, and was recognized as a unanimous All-American in 1994. He was drafted by the Chicago Bears in the second round of the 1995 NFL draft, and also played for the Kansas City Chiefs, Carolina Panthers, Denver Broncos, and New England Patriots of the NFL, and the Florida Tuskers of the United Football League (UFL).

== Early life ==
Sauerbrun was born and raised on Long Island, in Setauket, New York. He attended Ward Melville High School in East Setauket, and was a letterman in football and lacrosse. In football, as a senior, he averaged 45.1 yards per punt and kicked a field goal of 62 yards on October 27, 1990 (still the New York State high school record). In lacrosse, he was a high school U.S. Lacrosse All-America selection. He still holds the Ward Melville record for leading midfield scorer with 109 goals and 24 assists for 133 points.

He wanted to play both football and lacrosse in college and was recruited to play college lacrosse by several programs including Syracuse.

== College career ==
Sauerbrun attended West Virginia University, where he was a punter for the West Virginia Mountaineers football team from 1991 to 1994. He was a first-team All-Big East Conference selection in 1992, 1993, and 1994, and an honorable mention All-American in 1992 and 1993. As a senior in 1994, he set an NCAA record with a 48.4-yard punting average, and was recognized as a consensus first-team All-American.

== Professional career ==
Pre-draft measurables
Height	Weight	Arm length	Hand span
5 ft 9 3/4 in (1.77 m)	206 lb (93 kg)	29 3/8 in (0.75 m)	9 in (0.23 m)

Sauerbrun was drafted in the second round by the Chicago Bears 56th overall in the 1995 NFL draft. He spent five seasons with the Bears, and is ranked second on the team in all-time punting average. Sauerbraun tore his ACL in the third game of the 1998 season and missed the rest of the year. He was injured after a Tampa Bay Buccaneers player landed on his leg after a punt that drew a roughing the punter penalty. He spent the 2000 season with the Kansas City Chiefs, and was signed by the Carolina Panthers before the 2001 season.

Sauerbrun achieved both his greatest success and biggest problems while with Carolina. He was picked for the Pro Bowl to represent the NFC in the 2002, 2003, and 2004 seasons. Sauerbrun also became the first player from either conference since the AFL-NFL Merger in 1970 to lead his conference in gross punting average for three consecutive seasons (2001–2003). However, during the 2004 season, the Panthers were riddled with injuries, and at one point, starting placekicker John Kasay suffered a leg injury, and the Panthers were forced to use Sauerbrun to replace Kasay. Sauerbrun refused to kick unless he was reimbursed for fines he incurred when he was overweight.

In December 2004, he was charged with driving under the influence, and he was named in an investigation of steroids use in the NFL linked to a South Carolina doctor during the 2004 season.

As of 2017's NFL off-season, Todd Sauerbrun held at least 10 Panthers franchise records, including:

- Punts: season (104 in 2002), game (11 on 2002-12-22 CHI), playoff season (21 in 2003), playoff game (7 on 2004-02-01; with 2 others)
- Punt Yards: season (4,735 in 2002), playoff season (910 in 2003)
- Yards / Punt: career (45.54), playoffs (43.33), playoff season (43.33 in 2003), playoff game (48.4 on 2004-01-03 DAL)

On May 19, 2005, Sauerbrun was traded to the Denver Broncos for punter Jason Baker and a 7th round draft pick in the 2006 draft. On July 7, 2006, Sauerbrun was suspended for the first four games of the NFL season after testing positive for the banned dietary supplement ephedra. On October 17, 2006, the day he was supposed to come back from his suspension, Denver cut him in favor of punter Paul Ernster.

One of Sauerbrun's most notable NFL career moments occurred during the AFC Divisional Playoffs on January 14, 2006, when, in a rare move for a team punter, he managed to tackle New England Patriots returner Ellis Hobbs after his own kickoff and forced a fumble, which was recovered by teammate Cecil Sapp. This eventually led to a Broncos field goal, which helped Denver defeat the Patriots 27–13, ending New England's bid for three consecutive Super Bowl victories.

Sauerbrun was signed by the Patriots on December 22, 2006, to a one-year contract that gave them the right to match any contract he signed the next offseason.

On April 3, 2007, the Denver Broncos signed Sauerbrun to a one-year contract. However, a week later, the Patriots announced their decision to match Denver's offer to Sauerbrun. Shortly thereafter, the NFL Players Association filed a grievance on behalf of Sauerbrun regarding the details of the contract he signed with New England in 2006. On April 18, 2007, it was announced that Sauerbrun would once again be a free agent. Sauerbrun re-signed with the Denver Broncos on April 19, 2007.

Prior to facing the Chicago Bears, Sauerbrun stated that he would kick to Devin Hester, who was well known for his success as a kick and punt returner. Sauerbrun stated, "We're going after it. We're not going to kick away from him. Hey, we respect him and he's the best, but we have guys on our coverage teams that are paid to make big tackles." Hester responded by returning both a punt and kick-off for touchdowns. Sauerbrun attempted to tackle Hester on both returns, but failed. Later in the game, Sauerbrun had a punt blocked by Charles Tillman while attempting to kick away from Hester. Keith Olbermann, a commentator and anchor for NBC, awarded Sauerbrun with his dubious "Worst Person in the NFL Award", for challenging Hester and failing to stop him.

On December 18, 2007, the Denver Broncos released Sauerbrun for a second time after he was arrested by Denver police during an altercation with a taxi driver.

Sauerbrun was signed by the Florida Tuskers of the United Football League on September 9, 2009.

== NFL career statistics ==
Legend
	Led the league
**Bold**	Career high

=== Regular season ===
Year	Team	Punting									
Year	Team	GP	Punts	Yds	Net Yds	Lng	Avg	Net Avg	Blk	Ins20	TB
1995	CHI	15	55	2,080	1,712	61	37.8	31.1	0	16	6
1996	CHI	16	78	3,491	2,724	72	44.8	34.9	0	15	12
1997	CHI	16	95	4,059	3,112	67	42.7	32.8	0	26	11
1998	CHI	3	15	741	631	71	**49.4**	**42.1**	0	6	3
1999	CHI	16	85	3,478	3,012	65	40.9	35.4	0	20	10
2000	KAN	16	82	3,656	2,937	68	44.6	35.8	0	28	8
2001	CAR	16	93	4,419	3,654	**73**	47.5	38.9	1	**35**	**17**
2002	CAR	16	**104**	**4,735**	**3,941**	67	45.5	37.5	1	31	12
2003	CAR	16	77	3,433	2,851	64	44.6	35.6	**3**	22	9
2004	CAR	16	76	3,351	2,888	65	44.1	37.5	1	25	8
2005	DEN	16	72	3,157	2,771	66	43.8	38.0	1	24	6
2006	NWE	2	10	408	307	58	40.8	30.7	0	2	0
2007	DEN	14	47	2,200	1,767	65	46.8	36.1	2	14	6
Career		178	889	39,208	32,307	73	44.1	36.0	9	264	108

=== Postseason ===
Year	Team	Punting									
Year	Team	GP	Punts	Yds	Net Yds	Lng	Avg	Net Avg	Blk	Ins20	TB
2003	CAR	4	**21**	**910**	**772**	**59**	43.3	36.8	0	**6**	**2**
2005	DEN	2	8	361	311	58	45.1	**38.9**	0	4	0
2006	NWE	3	14	640	539	**59**	**45.7**	38.5	0	2	1
Career		43	43	1,911	1,622	59	44.4	37.7	0	12	3
