= Corey Bojorquez =

American football player (born 1996)

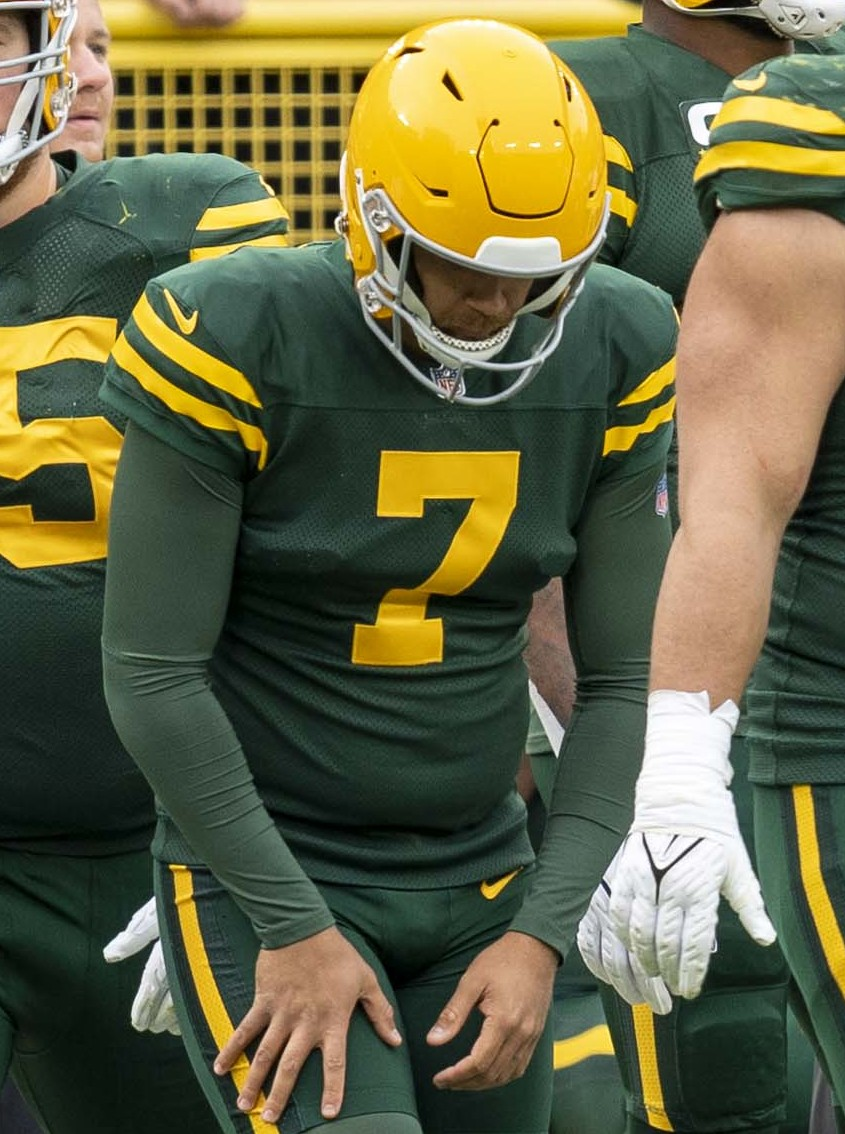
- Bojorquez with the Green Bay Packers in 2021

No. 13 – Cleveland Browns
- Position: Punter
- Roster status: Active

Personal information
- Born: September 13, 1996 (age 30); Bellflower, California, U.S.
- Listed height: 6 ft 0 in (1.83 m)
- Listed weight: 217 lb (98 kg)

Career information
- High school: Mayfair (Lakewood, California)
- College: Cerritos (2014–2015); New Mexico (2016–2017)
- NFL draft: 2018: undrafted

Career history
- New England Patriots (2018)*; Buffalo Bills (2018–2020); Los Angeles Rams (2021)*; Green Bay Packers (2021); Cleveland Browns (2022–present)
- * Offseason or practice squad member only

Awards and highlights
- 2× NFL punting yards leader (2024, 2025); First team All-Mountain West Conference (2017)

Career NFL statistics as of Week 10, 2026
- Punts: 594
- Punting yards: 28,088
- Punting average: 47.3
- Longest punt: 84
- Inside 20: 221
- Touchbacks: 59
- Stats at Pro Football Reference

Corey Bojorquez (/boʊˈhɔːrkɛz/ boh-HOR-kez; born September 13, 1996) is an American professional football punter for the Cleveland Browns of the National Football League (NFL). He played college football at Cerritos College before transferring to New Mexico, and signed with the New England Patriots as an undrafted free agent in 2018. He has also played for the Buffalo Bills, Los Angeles Rams, and Green Bay Packers.

== Early life ==
Bojorquez attended and played high school football at Mayfair High School in Lakewood, California.

== College career ==
Bojorquez verbally committed to play college football at Sacramento State, but changed his mind at the last minute, opting to play at Cerritos College, a junior college known for producing dozens of professional players, to improve his prospects of making it to an NCAA Division I Football Bowl Subdivision program. After Bojoroquez received offers from Indiana State University, a Football Championship Subdivision school, and Concordia University, a member of the RSEQ Conference in Canada, he decided to accept an offer to transfer to the University of New Mexico. He handled punts duties in the 2016 and 2017 seasons.

=== College statistics ===
Year	School	G	Punts	Yds	Avg
2016	New Mexico	13	49	2,067	42.2
2017	New Mexico	12	67	3,170	47.3
Career	New Mexico	25	116	5,237	45.1

== Professional career ==
Pre-draft measurables
Height	Weight	Arm length	Hand span	Wingspan
6 ft 0 1/4 in (1.84 m)	217 lb (98 kg)	30 1/2 in (0.77 m)	9 1/2 in (0.24 m)	6 ft 3 in (1.91 m)
All values from Pro Day

=== New England Patriots ===
Bojorquez signed with the New England Patriots as an undrafted free agent on May 14, 2018. He was waived on September 1, 2018. Bojorquez was one of the final preseason cuts by New England as the team opted to keep incumbent punter Ryan Allen, but was intended to be signed to their practice squad. He never played a snap during the preseason, only practicing some punts during the intermission of the last preseason game with the Patriots.

=== Buffalo Bills ===
On September 2, 2018, Bojorquez was claimed off waivers by the Buffalo Bills, and was named the starting punter after the team released Colton Schmidt. He made his NFL debut in the Bills' season opener against the Baltimore Ravens. In the 47–3 loss, he had eight punts for 397 net yards for a 49.6 average. Bojorquez sustained a shoulder injury during the October 7 game against the Tennessee Titans; after playing three games with the injured shoulder, he was placed on injured reserve on October 31, ending his season. Overall, he finished his rookie season with 45 punts for 2,028 net yards for a 45.07 average.

In the 2019 season, Bojorquez finished with 79 punts for 3,313 net yards for a 41.94 average. In the Wild Card Round of the playoffs against the Houston Texans, he was involved in an unusual sequence toward the end of the game. Bojorquez was normally the holder for the Bills on field goal attempts in 2019. The Bills did not know if they had a first down or if they were short with little time remaining. The spot of the ball was being reviewed by the booth. If the spot remained a fourth down, the Bills would be forced to attempt a field goal with time expiring. To counter this, Bills' head coach Sean McDermott sent the special teams onto the field during the review. After the review, the Bills had earned a first down and the clock restarted. Instead of losing valuable time to get the special teams off of the field, Bojorquez had to get under center and spike the ball to stop the clock.

In week 5 of the 2020 season against the Titans, Bojorquez had a career-long 74-yard punt, breaking his previous career long set the previous week. In the 2020 season, he punted 41 times for a 50.78 average.

=== Los Angeles Rams ===
On April 20, 2021, Bojorquez signed with the Los Angeles Rams.

=== Green Bay Packers ===
On August 31, 2021, Bojorquez was traded to the Green Bay Packers along with a 2023 seventh-round draft pick in exchange for a 2023 sixth-round draft pick.

On October 17, 2021, Bojorquez had an 82-yard punt in the third quarter of a 24–14 victory over the Chicago Bears. The punt was a new career long for Bojorquez, the second-longest in Packers history, and the longest of the 2021 NFL season. In the 2021 season, he punted 53 times for a 46.55 average.

=== Cleveland Browns ===
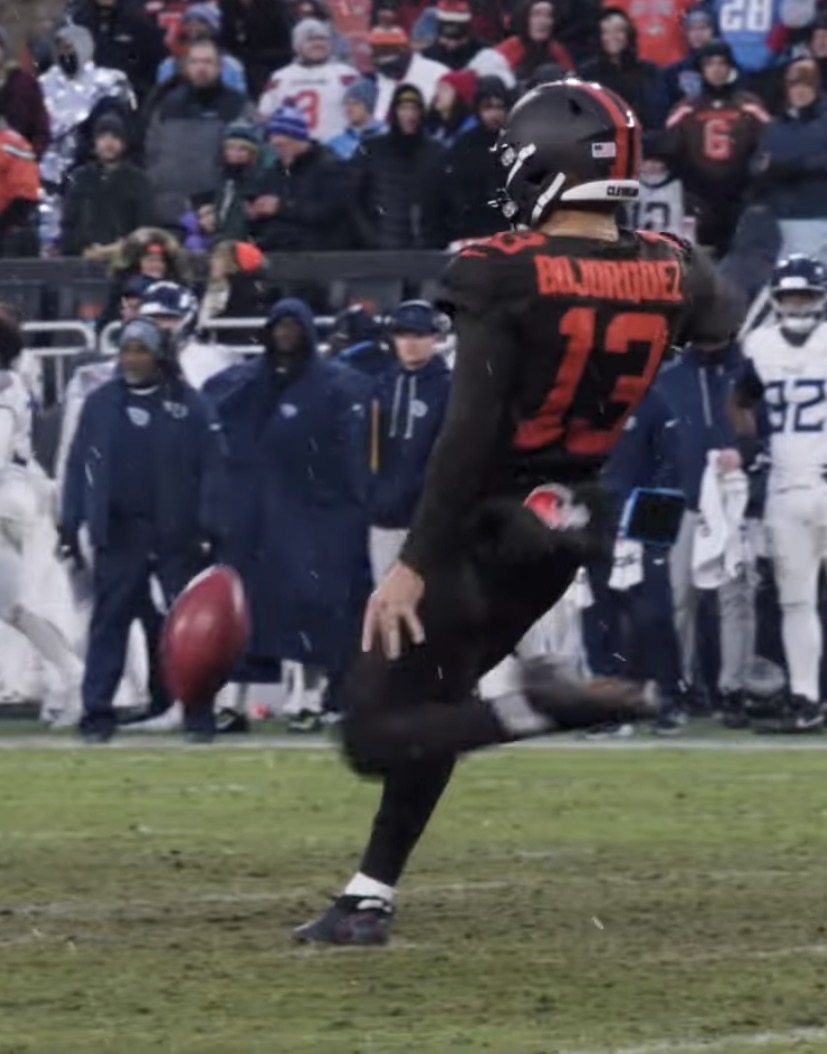
Bojorquez with the Cleveland Browns in 2025

On April 4, 2022, Bojorquez signed with the Cleveland Browns. He was named the starting punter in 2022, beating out Joseph Charlton. In Week 17, Bojorquez had four punts, two landing inside the 20-yard line with a long of 64 yards in a 24–10 win over the Washington Commanders, earning AFC Special Teams Player of the Week. In the 2022 season, he punted 61 times with a 48.51 average.

Bojorquez finished the 2023 season with 87 punts for 4,294 yards.

On March 15, 2024, Bojorquez signed a two-year contract extension with the Browns. He finished the 2024 season with 89 punts for a career high 4,387 total yards, and made a league-long 84-yard punt in Week 4 against the Las Vegas Raiders. He led the league in total punts and total punt yards.

On March 12, 2026, Bojorquez re-signed with the Browns on a one-year, $2 million contract.

== NFL career statistics ==
Legend
Led the league

=== Regular season ===
Year	Team	GP	Punting							
Year	Team	GP	Punts	Yds	Lng	Avg	Net Avg	Blk	Ins20	RetY
2018	BUF	8	45	2,028	60	45.1	39.4	1	22	137
2019	BUF	16	79	3,313	67	41.9	37.7	1	34	157
2020	BUF	16	41	2,082	72	50.8	44.0	0	18	138
2021	GB	17	53	2,467	82	46.5	40.0	0	18	268
2022	CLE	17	61	2,959	76	48.5	41.0	0	23	319
2023	CLE	16	87	4,294	73	49.4	42.4	0	31	421
2024	CLE	17	89	4,387	84	49.3	41.8	0	36	530
2025	CLE	17	91	4,165	67	45.8	37.0	2	23	522
2026	CLE	10	48	2,393	81	49.9	43.5	0	16	246
Total		134	594	28,088	84	47.3	40.3	4	221	2,738

=== Postseason ===
Year	Team	GP	Punting							
Year	Team	GP	Punts	Yds	Lng	Avg	Net Avg	Blk	Ins20	RetY
2019	BUF	1	4	179	56	44.8	37.0	0	1	11
2020	BUF	3	11	483	58	43.9	40.8	0	3	14
2021	GB	1	5	235	59	47.0	35.5	1	0	22
2023	CLE	1	4	176	52	44.0	42.0	0	0	8
Total		6	24	1,073	59	44.7	39.1	1	5	55

== Personal life ==
Bojorquez is the oldest of four siblings, and is married to Diana Wong of Hilo, Hawaii. He is an ordained minister. He is of Mexican descent.
