= Jack Stonehouse =

American football player (born 2003)

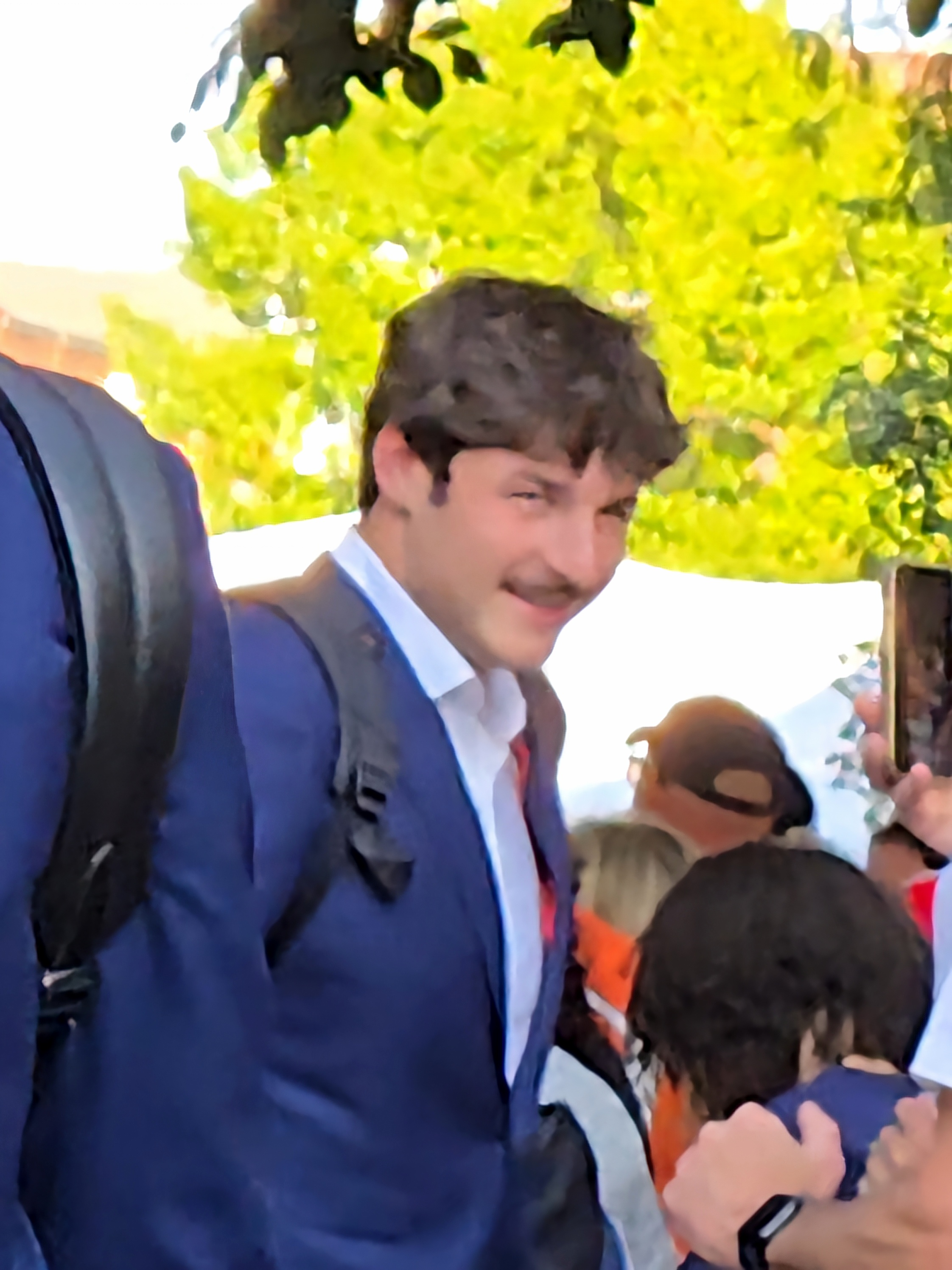

Dallas Renegades
- Position: Punter
- Roster status: Unsigned draft pick

Personal information
- Born: May 14, 2003 (age 23); Camarillo, California, U.S.
- Listed height: 6 ft 1 in (1.85 m)
- Listed weight: 215 lb (98 kg)

Career information
- High school: Chaminade College Preparatory School
- College: Missouri (2021–2022); Syracuse (2023–2025)
- NFL draft: 2026: undrafted

Career history
- Houston Texans (2026)*; Dallas Renegades (2027-present)
- * Offseason or practice squad member only

Awards and highlights
- First-team All-ACC (2025); Third team All-ACC (2023)
- Stats at Pro Football Reference

Jack Stonehouse (born May 14, 2003) is an American professional football punter. He played college football for the Syracuse Orange and for the Missouri Tigers.

== Early life ==
Stonehouse attended high school at Chaminade College Preparatory School located in San Fernando Valley, California. Coming out of high school, he committed to play college football for the Missouri Tigers.

== College career ==
=== Missouri ===
During his first collegiate season in 2021, Stonehouse used the season to redshirt and did not appear in any games. After initially losing the starting punting job, he took over as the starter after just three games. During the 2022 season, Stonehouse played in ten games, punting 47 times with an average of 42.3 yards per punt, where after the conclusion of the season he entered the NCAA transfer portal.

=== Syracuse ===
Stonehouse transferred to play for the Syracuse Orange. He won the starting punter job in his first season at Syracuse in 2023, where he averaged 44.6 yards per punt, earning third-team all-ACC honors. In 2024, Stonehouse averaged 45.7 yards per punt. During the 2025 season, he punted 60 times with an average 46.4 yards per punt, and 14 punts landing inside the 20-yard line, where for his performance he earned first-team all-ACC honors. After the conclusion of the 2025 season, Stonehouse declared for the 2026 NFL draft, and accepted an invite to the NFL Scouting Combine.

== Professional career ==
Pre-draft measurables
Height	Weight	Arm length	Hand span	Wingspan
6 ft 2 in (1.88 m)	211 lb (96 kg)	32 5/8 in (0.83 m)	9 1/4 in (0.23 m)	6 ft 5 3/4 in (1.97 m)
All values from NFL Combine

On May 8, 2026, Stonehouse signed with the Houston Texans as an undrafted free agent. He was waived on August 8.

== Personal life ==
Stonehouse is the son of former NFL punter, John Stonehouse, and the cousin of former all-pro punter, Ryan Stonehouse. Jack’s mother, Sue, played soccer at the University of California, Los Angeles. All three of Jack’s siblings play sports; Brooke played soccer at Toledo, Jessie played soccer at Wyoming then Sacred Heart, and Josh plays baseball at Xavier.
