= Donnie Jones =

American football player (born 1980)

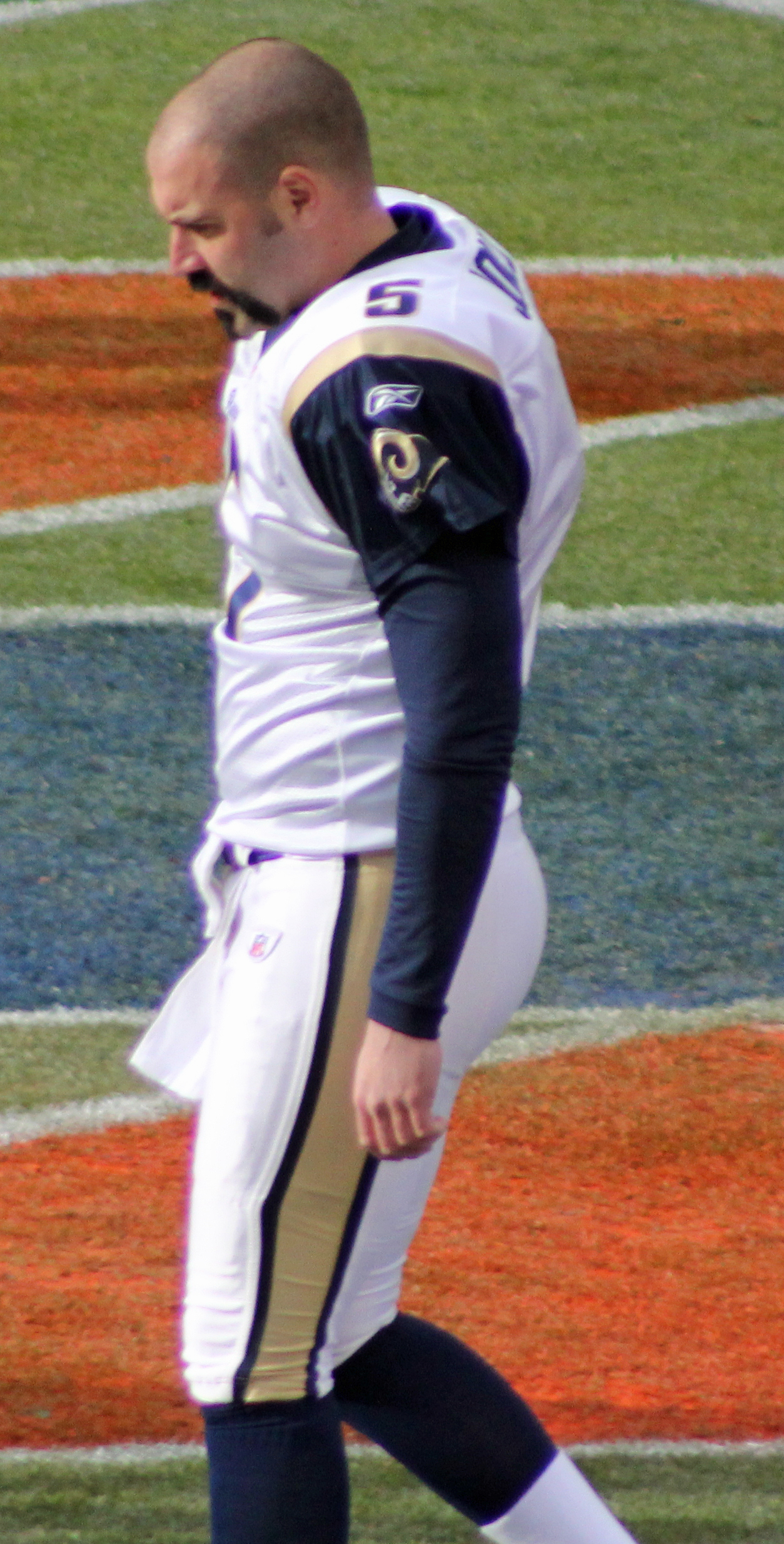
- Jones with the St. Louis Rams in 2010

No. 9, 5, 8
- Position: Punter

Personal information
- Born: July 5, 1980 (age 46); Baton Rouge, Louisiana, U.S.
- Listed height: 6 ft 2 in (1.88 m)
- Listed weight: 221 lb (100 kg)

Career information
- High school: Catholic (Baton Rouge)
- College: LSU (2000–2003)
- NFL draft: 2004: 7th round, 224th overall pick

Career history
- Seattle Seahawks (2004); Miami Dolphins (2005–2006); St. Louis Rams (2007–2011); Houston Texans (2012); Philadelphia Eagles (2013–2017); Los Angeles Chargers (2018)

Awards and highlights
- Super Bowl champion (LII); 2× Second-team All-Pro (2008, 2009); NFL punting yards leader (2010); BCS national champion (2003); Second-team All-SEC (2002)

Career NFL statistics
- Punts: 1,157
- Punting yards: 52,490
- Punting average: 45.4
- Longest punt: 80
- Inside 20: 379
- Stats at Pro Football Reference

Donald Scott Jones Jr. (born July 5, 1980) is an American former professional football player who was a punter in the National Football League (NFL). He played college football for the LSU Tigers and was selected by the Seattle Seahawks in the seventh round of the 2004 NFL draft. He also played for the Miami Dolphins, St. Louis Rams, Houston Texans, Philadelphia Eagles, and Los Angeles Chargers. With the Eagles, he won Super Bowl LII.

== Early life ==
Jones attended Catholic High School in Baton Rouge, Louisiana, and was a letterman in football. He was an All-Metro and All-State punter and an All-District tight end.

== College career ==
Jones was offered scholarships to play football at the University of Oklahoma, LSU, and Ohio State University. He accepted a scholarship to attend Louisiana State University, where he played for the Tigers.

As a freshman, Jones had 57 punts for 2,174 net yards for a 38.1 average. As a sophomore, he had 47 punts for 2,052 net yards for a 43.7 average. In his junior season, in the first quarter of the Kentucky game, known as the Bluegrass Miracle, he hit an 86-yard punt, the longest punt in school history. As a junior, he had 64 punts for 2,813 net yards for a 44.0 average. In his senior year, he was involved in the final play of the 2003 National Championship game, when the punt unit took the last snap of the game, and punted to ensure a victory for the team over Oklahoma in the Sugar Bowl. As a senior, he had 65 punts for 2,757 net yards for a 42.4 average. He was a four-year starter, averaging 42.4 yards on his 64 punts during his senior year, with a net average of 39 yards. He landed 22 of those punts inside the 20-yard line, and had seven touchbacks. He majored in finance.

== Professional career ==
Pre-draft measurables
Height	Weight	Arm length	Hand span
6 ft 2 5/8 in (1.90 m)	222 lb (101 kg)	31 1/4 in (0.79 m)	9 in (0.23 m)
All values from NFL Combine

=== Seattle Seahawks ===
Jones was selected in the seventh-round (224th overall) by the Seattle Seahawks in the 2004 NFL draft. He was one of three punters to be selected that year. He played in six games with Seahawks in between stints on the practice squad during his rookie season. He shared punting duties with Tom Rouen and Ken Walter during the season. On the year, Jones punted 26 times for a 38.0 average with a net of 32.2, six inside-the-20 and two touchbacks. He had a season long with a 51-yard punt against the Carolina Panthers on October 31. On November 14 at the St. Louis Rams, he punted three times for a 49.3-yard gross average and a net of 42.7, when he had another 51-yard punt.

=== Miami Dolphins ===
Jones was awarded off waivers to the Miami Dolphins on July 25, 2005. There he would be reunited with his college head coach Nick Saban. He was released following training camp and re-signed to the practice squad, but was placed on the active roster prior to the season opener. He went on to play in all 16 games in his first season with the Dolphins. On the season, he had 88 punts for a 43.5-yard average, including a net of 39.3, which led the NFL and marked a new Dolphins’ single-season record. He also added 31 punts inside-the-20, which ranked second in the AFC and was a Dolphins’ single-season record as well. Of his 88 punts, 24 went 50 yards or longer, with three traveling 60 yards or longer. He had a punt of 50 yards or longer in all but three games, and had a net average of 40.0 or better in nine games. He also held for placekicker Olindo Mare throughout the season. Jones' performance during the season earned him a selection as a third alternate for the Pro Bowl.

Jones experienced a bit of regression in 2006 compared to the previous year. For the season, he had 85 kicks for 3,640 yards – an average of 42.8 yards per kick. He also had a net average of 35.7 yards per punt, with 28 punts inside the 20-yard line. He had one punt blocked during the season.

Jones was a restricted free agent in the 2007 offseason. He was tendered a contract by the Miami Dolphins on March 2.

=== St. Louis Rams ===
On April 13, the St. Louis Rams signed Jones to an offer sheet. Less than a week later, Dolphins general manager Randy Mueller announced that the team would not match the offer sheet and Jones became property of the Rams in exchange for the 225th pick in the 2007 NFL draft. The contract was worth $5.585 million over five years. It included a signing bonus of $1.175 million and salaries of $510,000 in 2007, $700,000 in 2008, $1 million in 2009, $1.1 million in 2010, and $1.1 million in 2011.

In 2007, Jones broke the Rams record for highest punting average in a single season, punting 78 times for a 47.2-yard punting average. The previous record of 45.5-yard punting average lasted 45 years after being set in 1962 by Danny Villanueva. In 2008, he became the first NFL punter to average at least 50 yards per punt since Sammy Baugh in 1940. He was voted second-team All-Pro and a first alternate to the Pro Bowl. For the second straight year, he was voted an alternate to the Pro Bowl in 2009. In 2009, he broke the Rams career gross average punt record with a 48.0-yard average, surpassing the 44.3-yard average established by Danny Villanueva from 1961 to 1964. In the 2010 season, he finished with 94 punts for 4,276 net yards for a 45.49 average. In the 2011 season, he finished with 105 punts for 4,652 net yards for a 44.30 average.

=== Houston Texans ===
Jones signed a one-year contract with the Houston Texans on March 29, 2012. He was expected to compete with and briefly replace Brett Hartmann as punter while Hartmann served his three-game suspension, but took over as the full-time punter when Hartmann was released. In the 2012 season, he finished with 88 punts for 4,150 net yards for a 47.16 average.

=== Philadelphia Eagles ===
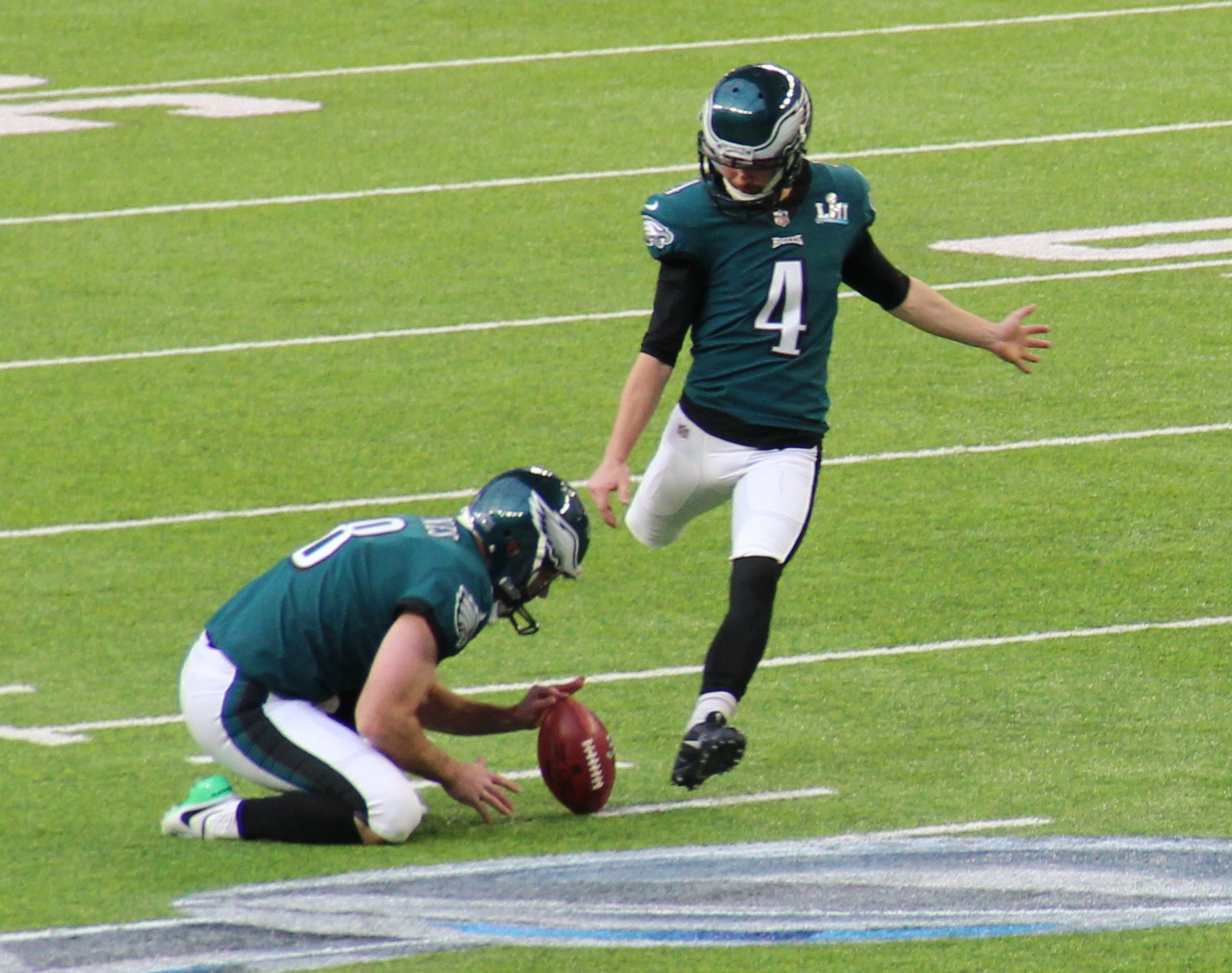
Jones holding for Jake Elliott during warmups prior to Super Bowl LII

On March 25, 2013, Jones signed with the Philadelphia Eagles. During the 2013 season, he set a franchise record for net punting average with 40.4 yards. He was named NFC Special Teams Player of the Week in Weeks 11 and 13. On March 11, 2014, Jones re-signed with the Eagles on a three-year deal worth a maximum of $6 million. In the 2014 season, he finished with 76 punts for 3,331 net yards for a 43.83 average. In the 2015 season, he finished with 86 punts for 4,038 net yards for a 46.95 average.

On November 18, 2016, Jones signed a three-year, $5.5 million contract extension with the Eagles through 2019. Overall, in the 2016 season, he finished with 63 punts for 2,888 net yards for a 45.84 average.

In the 2017 season, Jones finished with 67 punts for 3,033 net yards for a 45.27 average. He earned a Super Bowl ring when the Eagles defeated the New England Patriots 41–33 in Super Bowl LII. Jones recorded the only punt in the game that went 41 yards. During his time with the Eagles, Jones set the all-time Eagles gross punting average record with 45.4 yards, punts inside the 20-yard line with 138, and all-time net punting average with 40.5 yards.

On February 27, 2018, Jones announced his retirement from the NFL. On April 4, 2018, Jones requested and was granted his release from the Eagles' reserve/retired list, making him a free agent, citing his desire to play again.

=== Los Angeles Chargers ===
On October 2, 2018, Jones signed with the Los Angeles Chargers after the team released Drew Kaser. In the 2018 season, Jones finished with 47 punts for 1,990 net yards for a 42.34 average in 12 games.

== Career statistics ==
=== NFL ===
Year	Team	GP	Punting				
Year	Team	GP	Punts	Yards	Avg	Blk	Lng
2004	SEA	6	26	988	38.0	1	51
2005	MIA	16	88	3,827	43.5	0	63
2006	MIA	16	85	3,640	42.8	1	64
2007	STL	16	78	3,684	47.2	0	80
2008	STL	16	82	4,100	50.0	0	68
2009	STL	16	90	4,212	46.8	0	63
2010	STL	16	94	4,276	45.5	0	63
2011	STL	16	105	4,652	44.3	1	65
2012	HOU	16	88	4,150	47.2	0	66
2013	PHI	16	82	3,681	44.9	1	70
2014	PHI	16	76	3,331	43.8	0	68
2015	PHI	16	86	4,038	47.0	2	64
2016	PHI	16	63	2,888	45.8	0	72
2017	PHI	16	67	3,033	45.3	1	62
2018	LAC	12	47	1,990	42.3	0	59
Career		226	1,157	52,490	45.4	7	80

=== College ===
Year	School	Class	Pos	G	Punts	Yds	Avg
2000	LSU	Freshman	P	11	57	2,174	38.1
2001	LSU	Sophomore	P	12	47	2,054	43.7
2002	LSU	Junior	P	13	64	2,813	44.0
2003	LSU	Senior	P	14	65	2,757	42.4
Career				50	233	9,798	42.1

== Personal life ==
Donnie is married to Aubrie, and the couple resides in Baton Rouge, Louisiana. Following the 2003 National Championship season at LSU, Jones penned a book titled Nine Seconds to a Championship (ISBN 0-9760181-9-5) about his career as a member of the LSU Tigers football team. He is also known as Thunder Foot, Donnie Long-Ball, Donnie Boom, Donnie J'Owns, Do-Rag Donnie, and Donnie ‘Bag of Bones’ Jones.
