= Billy Van Heusen =

American football player (born 1946)

No. 42
- Positions: Punter, Wide receiver

Personal information
- Born: August 27, 1946 (age 80); New Rochelle, New York, U.S.
- Listed height: 6 ft 1 in (1.85 m)
- Listed weight: 200 lb (91 kg)

Career information
- High school: Mamaroneck (Mamaroneck, New York)
- College: Maryland
- NFL draft: 1968: undrafted

Career history
- Denver Broncos (1968–1976)

Awards and highlights
- NFL punting yards leader (1970)

Career NFL/AFL statistics
- Punts: 547
- Punting yards: 23,963
- Punting average: 41.7
- Longest punt: 78
- Receptions: 82
- Receiving yards: 1,684
- Receiving touchdowns: 11
- Stats at Pro Football Reference

Billy Van Heusen (born August 27, 1946) is an American former professional football player who was a punter and wide receiver for the Denver Broncos of the American Football League (AFL) and National Football League (NFL) from 1968 to 1976. He played college football for the Maryland Terrapins.

== See also ==
- List of American Football League players
