= Jason Baker =

American football player (born 1978)

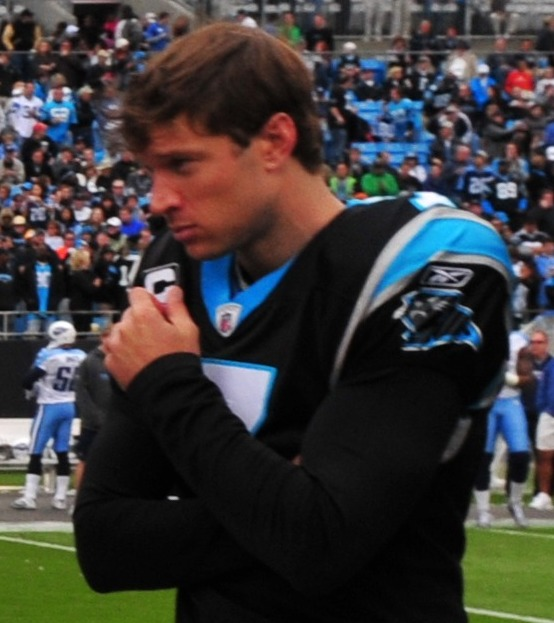
- Baker with the Carolina Panthers in 2011

No. 7, 6, 9
- Position: Punter

Personal information
- Born: May 17, 1978 (age 48); Fort Wayne, Indiana, U.S.
- Listed height: 6 ft 2 in (1.88 m)
- Listed weight: 205 lb (93 kg)

Career information
- High school: Wayne (Fort Wayne, Indiana)
- College: Iowa
- NFL draft: 2001: undrafted

Career history
- Philadelphia Eagles (2001)*; San Francisco 49ers (2001–2002); Philadelphia Eagles (2002); Kansas City Chiefs (2003–2004); Indianapolis Colts (2004); Denver Broncos (2004); Carolina Panthers (2005–2011)
- * Offseason or practice squad member only

Awards and highlights
- NFL punting yards leader (2006)

Career NFL statistics
- Punts: 798
- Punting yards: 34,097
- Punting average: 42.7
- Stats at Pro Football Reference

Jason Michael Baker (born May 17, 1978) is an American former professional football player who was a punter in the National Football League (NFL). He was signed by the San Francisco 49ers as an undrafted free agent in 2001. He played college football for the Iowa Hawkeyes. He has also played for the Philadelphia Eagles, Kansas City Chiefs, Indianapolis Colts, Denver Broncos, and Carolina Panthers.

== Early life ==
Baker attended Wayne High School in Fort Wayne, Indiana and lettered in football and baseball. In football, he won second-team All-Conference honors as a senior.

== College career ==
Baker played college football at the University of Iowa. When he graduated, he left as the Hawkeyes' all-time leader in punts and punting yards, with 272 punts for 11,304 yards. He was named special teams MVP of the 1997 Sun Bowl for his performance in Iowa's loss against Arizona State University, after registering eight punts for 391 yards. He also made honorable mention All-Big Ten honors as a senior in 2000. He majored in business administration.

== Professional career ==
He was not drafted by any team, and was signed as a free agent by the Philadelphia Eagles in April 2001 before being waived a short while later, not having appeared in any regular season games for them. He was then picked up by the San Francisco 49ers, and was their regular punter during the 2001 NFL season. He was released the next year, and signed again by the Eagles. He played several games for them before being released again at the end of the season. He was signed by the Kansas City Chiefs before the 2003 season, and was their regular punter for the whole season, averaging a respectable 39.5 yards per punt. Baker then had a bizarre season in 2004. He was waived by Kansas City, then re-signed two weeks later, then waived a week after that. He was then picked up by the Indianapolis Colts, played with them for 5 weeks, then Indianapolis waived him and he was picked up by the Denver Broncos, who he finished the season with. He played for Denver in the AFC wild card game against his former team, Indianapolis. After the season, he was traded to the Carolina Panthers with a 2006 draft pick for Pro Bowl punter Todd Sauerbrun. Baker eventually won the punting job, after battling with Tom Rouen and Steve Cheek during training camp and the preseason. He played the rest of his seven seasons in Carolina, where he averaged 44.0 yards per punt in 112 games, set most of the franchise records, twice led the league in punts, and was a Pro Bowl alternate multiple times but never attended. The Panthers rewarded him with a contract making him the highest paid punter in the NFL prior to the 2007 season. Baker is one of the fastest running punters in the NFL. He managed to surprise the Seahawks' Leon Washington in a game on December 5, 2010, tripping up the prematurely celebrating Washington to save a touchdown.

As of 2017's NFL off-season, Jason Baker still held at least three Panthers franchise records, including:

- Punts: career (570), playoff game (7 on 2006-01-22 @SEA; with Todd Sauerbrun and Brad Nortman)
- Punt yards: career (25,064)

== NFL career statistics ==
Legend
| | Led the league |
| **Bold** | Career high |

=== Regular season ===
| Year | Team | Punting | | | | | | | | | |
| Year | Team | GP | Punts | Yds | Net Yds | Lng | Avg | Net Avg | Blk | Ins20 | TB |
|---|---|---|---|---|---|---|---|---|---|---|---|
| 2001 | SFO | **16** | 69 | 2,813 | 2,443 | 64 | 40.8 | 35.4 | 0 | 21 | 4 |
| 2002 | SFO | 11 | 42 | 1,688 | 1,346 | 51 | 40.2 | 32.0 | 0 | 12 | 3 |
| 2002 | PHI | 2 | 13 | 445 | 388 | 44 | 34.2 | 29.8 | 0 | 2 | 1 |
| 2003 | KAN | **16** | 80 | 3,156 | 2,689 | 68 | 39.5 | 33.2 | 1 | 21 | 7 |
| 2004 | KAN | 2 | 9 | 340 | 242 | 52 | 37.8 | 26.9 | 0 | 3 | 0 |
| 2004 | IND | 4 | 0 | 0 | 0 | 0 | 0.0 | 0.0 | 0 | 0 | 0 |
| 2004 | DEN | 4 | 15 | 591 | 516 | 48 | 39.4 | 34.4 | 0 | 7 | 1 |
| 2005 | CAR | **16** | 72 | 3,118 | 2,803 | 59 | 43.3 | 38.9 | 0 | 23 | 4 |
| 2006 | CAR | **16** | **98** | **4,483** | **3,861** | **70** | **45.7** | **39.0** | 1 | **31** | **12** |
| 2007 | CAR | **16** | 90 | 3,978 | 3,393 | 64 | 44.2 | 37.7 | 0 | 22 | 5 |
| 2008 | CAR | **16** | 73 | 3,217 | 2,841 | 63 | 44.1 | 37.4 | **3** | 30 | 5 |
| 2009 | CAR | **16** | 76 | 3,352 | 2,820 | 61 | 44.1 | 36.6 | 1 | 22 | 4 |
| 2010 | CAR | **16** | 95 | 4,097 | 3,469 | 60 | 43.1 | 36.5 | 0 | 22 | 7 |
| 2011 | CAR | **16** | 66 | 2,819 | 2,253 | 56 | 42.7 | 34.1 | 0 | 19 | 5 |
| Career | | 167 | 798 | 34,097 | 29,064 | 70 | 42.7 | 36.1 | 6 | 235 | 58 |

=== Playoffs ===
| Year | Team | Punting | | | | | | | | | |
| Year | Team | GP | Punts | Yds | Net Yds | Lng | Avg | Net Avg | Blk | Ins20 | TB |
|---|---|---|---|---|---|---|---|---|---|---|---|
| 2001 | SFO | 1 | 5 | 183 | 148 | 45 | 36.6 | 29.6 | 0 | 3 | 0 |
| 2003 | KAN | 1 | 0 | 0 | 0 | 0 | 0.0 | 0.0 | 0 | 0 | 0 |
| 2004 | DEN | 1 | 4 | 150 | 141 | 46 | 37.5 | 35.3 | 0 | 1 | 0 |
| 2005 | CAR | **3** | **16** | **600** | **547** | 52 | 37.5 | 34.2 | 0 | **7** | **2** |
| 2008 | CAR | 1 | 4 | 192 | 177 | **53** | **48.0** | **44.3** | 0 | 0 | 0 |
| Career | | 7 | 29 | 1,125 | 1,013 | 53 | 38.8 | 34.9 | 0 | 11 | 2 |
