= Sid Tinsley =

American football player (1920–2006)

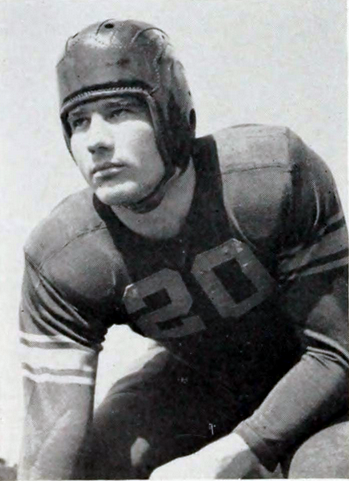
- Tinsley at Clemson in 1941

Profile
- Position: Punter

Personal information
- Born: January 14, 1920; Spartanburg, South Carolina, U.S.
- Died: June 3, 2006 (aged 86); Spartanburg, South Carolina, U.S.
- Listed height: 5 ft 9 in (1.75 m)
- Listed weight: 168 lb (76 kg)

Career information
- College: Clemson
- NFL draft: : 1st overall pick1945: undrafted

Career history
- Pittsburgh Steelers (1945)

Awards and highlights
- NFL punting yards leader (1945)

Career NFL statistics
- Punts: 57
- Punting yards: 2,308
- Punting average: 40.5

Sidney Wallace Tinsley (January 14, 1920 – June 3, 2006) was an American professional football punter in the National Football League (NFL). After playing college football at Clemson, Tinsley played one season for the Pittsburgh Steelers in 1945.

== College career ==
Tinsley played college football for the Clemson Tigers program. While at Clemson, Tinsley was a running back.

Tinsley's college career was interrupted by World War II, as he was drafted into the Army. After returning to Clemson in 1944, Tinsley found out that his roommate and Tigers teammate Claude Rothell was killed during the Normandy landings.

== NFL career ==
After college, Tinsley played in the NFL for the Pittsburgh Steelers during their 1945 season. Although he was a running back at Clemson, the Steelers primarily used Tinsley as punter. Tinsley did rush the ball 5 times for 3 yards. Tinsley also recorded an interception and recovered a fumble. However, Tinsley's greatest accomplishment came through his punting, as he led the league in punts (57) and punting yards (2,308) in 1945. An injury ahead of the 1946 season ended his football career.
