= Ryan Stonehouse =

American football player (born 1999)

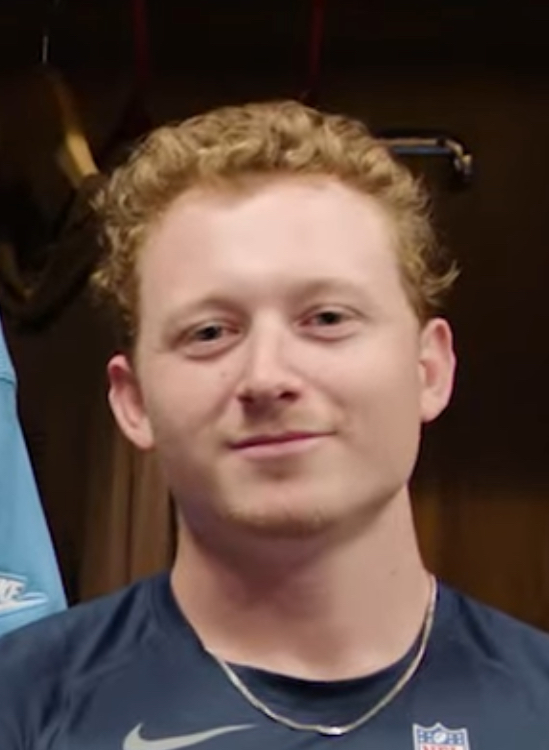
- Stonehouse in 2024

Profile
- Position: Punter

Personal information
- Born: May 11, 1999 (age 27); San Dimas, California, U.S.
- Listed height: 5 ft 10 in (1.78 m)
- Listed weight: 200 lb (91 kg)

Career information
- High school: Mater Dei (Santa Ana, California)
- College: Colorado State (2017–2021)
- NFL draft: 2022: undrafted

Career history
- Tennessee Titans (2022–2024); Miami Dolphins (2025)*
- * Offseason or practice squad member only

Awards and highlights
- NFL punting yards leader (2022); Second-team All-Pro (2022); PFWA All-Rookie Team (2022); 3× First-team All-MW (2018–2020); Second-team All-MW (2021); NFL records: Most games averaging 50+ yards per punt in a single season: 14 (2022); Single-season average yards per punt: 53.1 (2022)

Career NFL statistics as of 2025
- Punts: 216
- Punting yards: 11,282
- Punting average: 52.2
- Longest punt: 75
- Inside 20: 80
- Touchbacks: 26
- Stats at Pro Football Reference

Ryan Matthew Stonehouse (born May 11, 1999) is an American professional football punter. He played college football for the Colorado State Rams and signed with the Tennessee Titans as an undrafted free agent in 2022.

Stonehouse currently holds the NCAA FBS and Mountain West Conference records for highest career average yards per punt, as well as the NFL single-season record for average yards per punt.

== Early life ==
Stonehouse was born on May 11, 1999, in San Dimas, California to parents Natalie Banks and Paul Stonehouse. His father, Paul, was a punter for Stanford from 1989 to 1992. Two of his uncles were also Division I punters: John Stonehouse (USC, 1992–95) and Jeff Banks (Washington State, 1996–97).

Stonehouse attended Mater Dei High School in Santa Ana, California. In 2016, he helped his Mater Dei team to a 13–1 record and a deep CIF playoff run, losing in the semi-finals to St. John Bosco. Stonehouse was named a Blue & Grey All-American and was named to the 2016 L.A. Times All-Star football team, among other awards. He also participated in the Kohl's Kicking 2016 Western Winter Showcase and was rated as a five-star punter.

Stonehouse was officially rated as a three-star recruit and the third best punter prospect in the class of 2017 by 247Sports.com.

== College career ==
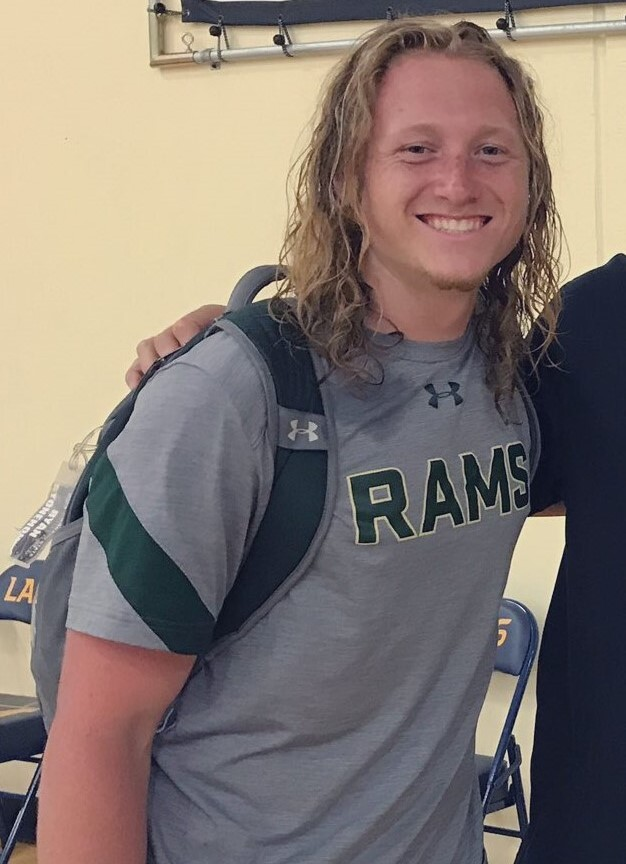
Stonehouse with Colorado State in 2019

Stonehouse received 11 total offers from NCAA Division I schools. On February 14, 2017, he accepted a scholarship offer from Colorado State over offers from Arizona, Cal, Cornell, Eastern Washington, Illinois, Tennessee, Toledo, Utah State, UTSA, and Wyoming.

As a freshman in 2017, Stonehouse was named to the Ray Guy Award watch list, as well as receiving an All-Mountain West honorable mention. Stonehouse was one of five true freshman to play in every game; he punted 46 times in 13 games and ranked fifth in the country with a 45.9-yard punt average.

As a sophomore in 2018, Stonehouse played in all 12 games and finished second in the FBS with a 48.3-yard punt average. He punted 65 times for a total 3,140 yards, placing 18 punts within the 20-yard line. Stonehouse was selected to the 2018 All-Mountain West first team, as well as being named to the 2018 Sporting News All-American second team.

As a junior in 2019, Stonehouse was named to the All-Mountain West first team for the second consecutive year after punting 49 times for 2,274 yards with a 46.4-yard punt average.

As a senior in 2020, Stonehouse played in all four games, as the season was heavily condensed due to the COVID-19 pandemic. In just four games, he punted 26 times for 1,178 yards and was named to the All-Mountain West first team for the third consecutive year.

As a graduate student in 2021, his final year at CSU, Stonehouse was ranked the best punter and the 34th best overall player in the Mountain West Conference entering the season. Stonehouse finished the season having punted 58 times for 2,953 yards, recording a career-best single-season punt average of 50.9 yards. Despite this, Stonehouse was named to the 2021 All-Mountain West second team, as San Diego State punter Matt Araiza, who led the FBS and Mountain West with a 51.5-yard punt average, was named to the first team.

Over the span of his collegiate career, Stonehouse punted 244 times for a total of 11,656 yards. He broke the NCAA FBS record for the highest career average yards per punt with his 47.8-yard average, which was previously held by Florida punter Johnny Townsend with a 46.2 average. Stonehouse also holds the Mountain West Conference's highest career average yards per punt record, previously held by BYU punter Matt Payne (45.4; 2001–04).

== Professional career ==
Pre-draft measurables
Height	Weight	Arm length	Hand span	Wingspan
5 ft 9 1/2 in (1.77 m)	193 lb (88 kg)	30 in (0.76 m)	9 1/2 in (0.24 m)	6 ft 0 3/4 in (1.85 m)
All values from Pro Day

=== Tennessee Titans ===
==== 2022 season ====
Stonehouse signed with the Tennessee Titans as an undrafted free agent on May 13, 2022. He performed well throughout the preseason and won the punting job when the Titans released longtime punter Brett Kern on August 29.

During a narrow Week 3 24–22 victory over the Las Vegas Raiders, Stonehouse punted thrice for 181 yards with a long of 70 yards. Two weeks later against the Washington Commanders, he punted eight times for 416 yards in the 21–17 road victory. Stonehouse was named AFC Special Teams Player of the Month for October after recording 20 punts for 1,033 yards and a 51.7 average.

During a Week 10 17–10 victory over the Denver Broncos, Stonehouse punted eight times for 432 yards, including three inside the 10-yard line with a long of 74 yards, earning AFC Special Teams Player of the Week honors. Two weeks later against the Cincinnati Bengals, he had five punts for 269 yards with a long of 71 yards in the 20–16 loss. In the next game against the Philadelphia Eagles, Stonehouse punted seven times for 401 yards during the 35–10 road loss.

Stonehouse recorded an average of 53.1 yards per punt throughout his rookie season, which set a new single-season NFL record. The record, previously set in 1940 by Sammy Baugh with a 51.4 average, lasted 82 seasons before being broken by Stonehouse. He was also the punting yards leader in 2022, punting 90 times for 4,779 yards. He was named to the PFWA All-Rookie Team and second-team AP All-Pro.

==== 2023 season ====
During a Week 3 27–3 road loss to the Cleveland Browns, Stonehouse had seven punts for 374 yards with a long of 74 yards. During a Week 8 28–23 victory over the Atlanta Falcons, he had a season-high eight punts for 420 yards. During a Week 12 17–10 victory over the Carolina Panthers, Stonehouse punted seven times for 376 yards with a long of 71 yards, earning AFC Special Teams Player of the Week. However, in the next game the Indianapolis Colts, he suffered a serious leg injury after a second blocked punt and was later announced to be out for the rest of the season. The injury was later revealed to be a torn ACL, MCL, and a broken bone, all in his non-kicking leg.

Stonehouse finished his second professional season with 53 punts for 2,812 yards and a 53.1 average, leading the league in yards per punt for the second consecutive year and nearly tying the record he set last year. He led the league in punts inside the 20-yard line (52.8%)

==== 2024 season ====
Stonehouse made a healthy return in time for the 2024 season, but the team's punt protection problems continued into the next year, resulting in a blocked punt in each of the first two games of the regular season. Stonehouse still went on to punt all 17 games of the season, making 73 punts for 3,691 yards and a 50.6 average, including a career long 75-yard punt in Week 6 against the Indianapolis Colts. He was third in yards per punts that year and was named as an alternate to the 2025 Pro Bowl.

On March 11, 2025, the Titans chose not to assign Stonehouse his RFA tender, making him an unrestricted free agent.

=== Miami Dolphins ===
On March 16, 2025, Stonehouse signed with the Miami Dolphins. He was waived on August 19.

== NFL career statistics ==
Legend
	NFL record
	Led the league
**Bold**	Career high

=== Regular season ===
Year	Team	GP	Punting				
Year	Team	GP	Punts	Yds	Avg	Lng	Blk
2022	TEN	**17**	**90**	**4,779**	**53.1**	74	0
2023	TEN	12	53	2,812	**53.1**	74	0
2024	TEN	**17**	73	3,691	50.6	**75**	**2**
Career		46	216	11,282	52.2	75	2

== Personal life ==
Stonehouse enjoys DIY projects. In his spare time, Stonehouse has built various projects, including a covered outdoor kitchen in his backyard. Stonehouse also enjoys fostering and working with shelter dogs. Stonehouse’s cousin Jack Stonehouse was a all ACC punter while he played for the Syracuse Orangeman.
