= Jim Fraser (American football) =

American football player (1936–2020)

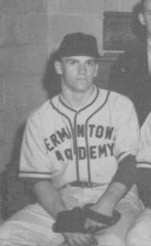
- Fraser on his high school baseball team c. 1954

No. 45, 55, 51
- Positions: Linebacker, punter

Personal information
- Born: May 29, 1936; Philadelphia, Pennsylvania, U.S.
- Died: April 18, 2020 (aged 83); Lansdale, Pennsylvania, U.S.
- Listed height: 6 ft 3 in (1.91 m)
- Listed weight: 236 lb (107 kg)

Career information
- High school: Germantown (Fort Washington, Pennsylvania)
- College: Wisconsin
- NFL draft: 1959: 21st round, 250th overall pick

Career history
- Hamilton Tiger-Cats (1959); Denver Broncos (1962–1964); Kansas City Chiefs (1965); Boston Patriots (1966); New Orleans Saints (1968)

Awards and highlights
- 3× AFL All-Star (1962–1964); AFL punting yards leader (1963)

Career NFL/AFL statistics
- Punts: 278
- Punting yards: 11,737
- Punting average: 42.2
- Longest punt: 75
- Interceptions: 3
- Stats at Pro Football Reference

James Gallagher Fraser (May 29, 1936 – April 18, 2020) was an American professional football player who was a linebacker and punter in the American Football League (AFL) and National Football League (NFL). He played college football for the Wisconsin Badgers and was selected in the 21st round (250th overall) of the 1959 NFL draft by the Cleveland Browns. He played three seasons for the Denver Broncos and one season with the Kansas City Chiefs, the Boston Patriots and the New Orleans Saints of the National Football League (NFL).

Fraser led the AFL in average yards per punt with the Broncos from 1962–1964.

== Coaching career ==
Following his retirement, Fraser became a coach, serving at Cornell, Illinois, Trinity Valley School, and Episcopal High School in Alexandria, Virginia. He spent 70 summers at Camp Tecumseh on Lake Winnipesaukee in New Hampshire as a camper, counselor, and coach.

== Death ==
Fraser died from the coronavirus on April 18, 2020.
