= Danny Villanueva =

American football player and broadcasting executive (1937–2015)

No. 11
- Positions: Placekicker, punter

Personal information
- Born: November 5, 1937; Tucumcari, New Mexico, U.S.
- Died: June 18, 2015 (aged 77); Ventura, California, U.S.
- Listed height: 5 ft 11 in (1.80 m)
- Listed weight: 200 lb (91 kg)

Career information
- High school: Calexico (Calexico, California)
- College: New Mexico State
- NFL draft: 1960: undrafted

Career history
- Los Angeles Rams (1960–1964); Dallas Cowboys (1965–1967)

Career NFL statistics
- Punts: 488
- Punting yards: 20,862
- Longest punt: 68
- Field goals made: 85
- Field goal attempts: 160
- Field goal %: 53.1
- Longest field goal: 51
- Stats at Pro Football Reference

Daniel Dario Villanueva (November 5, 1937 – June 18, 2015) was an American football player and a television and Major League Soccer (MLS) executive. Villanueva played professionally in the National Football League (NFL) as a placekicker and punter for the Los Angeles Rams and the Dallas Cowboys. Villanueva, who was of Mexican American descent, played college football for the New Mexico State Aggies.

A news director and broadcasting executive, Villanueva was a co-founder of Univision, a major Spanish-language television network in the United States.

== Early life ==
Villanueva graduated in 1956 from Calexico Union High School (the Bulldogs) and attended Reedley College, before accepting a scholarship to play college football at New Mexico State University. As a senior, he made seven out of eight field goal attempts, including a long of 47 yards. While at NMSU he was a member of Tau Kappa Epsilon Fraternity.

He was part of the teams that won back to back Sun Bowl games in 1959 and 1960, as well as going undefeated his senior season. These were significant accomplishments, considering that more than 50 years have passed without another postseason appearance for the New Mexico State University football teams.

In 1970, he was inducted into the New Mexico State University Athletics Hall of Fame.

== Professional NFL career ==
=== Los Angeles Rams ===
Villanueva was signed as an undrafted free agent by the Los Angeles Rams after the 1960 NFL draft, becoming one of the earliest players of Mexican descent in the NFL, and one of the last straight-away style placekickers. Villanueva was both a placekicker and a punter, so he kept two different pairs of shoes on game day.

During his time with the Rams he was nicknamed "El Kickador" and "El Toe-reador", with bullfighting music being played whenever he walked onto the field at the Los Angeles Memorial Coliseum. In 1962, he led the NFL in punting, set the Rams' record for the longest field goal (51 yards) and the single-season record for punting average (45.5), which lasted for 45 years until it was broken in 2007 by Donnie Jones. In 1963, he ranked third in the NFL in punting with a 45.4-yard average.

He led the team in scoring from 1960 to 1963, until Bruce Gossett won the placekicker starting job in 1964. On May 14, 1966, the Rams traded him to the Dallas Cowboys, in exchange for wide receiver and future hall of famer Tommy McDonald. He left as the Rams career gross average punting leader with 44.3 yards, a record that was broken by Donnie Jones in 2009.

=== Dallas Cowboys ===
In 1965, he had an instant impact improving the special teams unit, eventually setting the franchise record with 100 consecutive extra point conversions (1965–1967). In 1966, he ranked second in the league in scoring, with a career-high 107 points, while setting the Cowboys record for most extra points made without a miss in a season with 56.

Villanueva retired after the 1967 NFL Championship Game famously known as "The Ice Bowl". He finished with a 42.8 career punting average with only two blocked punts and 491 career points.

== Major League Soccer ==
Villanueva was the first general manager of the Los Angeles Galaxy, serving from 1994 to 1998.

== Personal life ==
Villanueva went on to become a self-made multimillionaire. He started as a sports broadcaster on KNBC in Los Angeles, California. In the 1970s he became part-owner of the Spanish International Network (SIN), a Spanish-language network based in the United States with stations located in cities across the US with significant Spanish language populations. In 1986, the network was sold and renamed to Univision. Villanueva launched the annual "Navidad en el Barrio" telethon in 1971 to raise money for toys and food for needy Hispanic families in Southern California during the Christmas season, which was televised annually in December from 1971 to the early 1990s on KMEX-TV. In 1990, he launched the annual Fiesta Broadway Cinco de Mayo celebration which takes place in downtown Los Angeles.

In 1988, he was inducted into the National Hispanic Hall of Fame as part of the inaugural group. In 2003 the National Academy of Television Arts and Sciences inducted him into the Management Hall of Fame as part of the inaugural group. In 2007, he was inducted into the Hispanic Sports Foundation for Education Inc.'s National Hispanic Hall Of Fame. He died after a stroke in 2015.

He was married to Myrna Schmidt, with whom he had two sons Daniel L. and Jim. His brother, Primo Villanueva, was one of the first Hispanic surnamed players in the Canadian Football League (CFL). He died on June 18, 2015.
