= Michael Hayes (Canadian football) =

American gridiron football player (born 1990)

No. 34
- Position: Running back

Personal information
- Born: June 18, 1990 (age 36)
- Listed height: 5 ft 9 in (1.75 m)
- Listed weight: 200 lb (91 kg)

Career information
- High school: East Bernard (East Bernard, Texas)
- College: Blinn (2008–2009); Houston (2010–2011)
- NFL draft: 2012: undrafted

Career history
- San Diego Chargers (2012)*; Ottawa Redblacks (2014)
- * Offseason or practice squad member only

Awards and highlights
- NJCAA national champion (2009)

Michael Hayes (born June 18, 1990) is an American former football running back. He played college football at Blinn and Houston. He played professionally for the Ottawa Redblacks of the Canadian Football League (CFL).

== Early life ==
Michael Hayes was born on June 18, 1990. He attended East Bernard High School in East Bernard, Texas.

== College career ==
Hayes first played college football at Blinn College. As a freshman in 2008, he rushed 130 times for 769 yards and eight touchdowns while also catching 18 passes for 219 yards and two touchdowns. In 2009, he recorded 204 carries for 1,269 yards and 17 touchdowns, and 31 receptions for 329 yards and one touchdown. Hayes helped Blinn win the 2009 NJCAA National Football Championship.

Hayes transferred to play for the Houston Cougars of the University of Houston, where he was a two-year letterman from 2010 to 2011. He played in all 12 games, starting three, his junior year in 2010, rushing 150 times for 629 yards and eight touchdowns while catching 30 passes for 327 yards and two touchdowns. During the 2011 season opener against UCLA, he broke five tackles during a 34-yard touchdown run. This play was shown on SportsCenter's top 10 plays for the day. Hayes finished the year with 138 carries for 727 yards and 11 touchdowns, and 44 receptions for 483 yards and four touchdowns. He majored in sociology at Houston.

== Professional career ==
After going undrafted in the 2012 NFL draft, Hayes signed with the San Diego Chargers on May 14, 2012. He shared a hotel room with fellow rookie running back Edwin Baker during training camp. Hayes competed with Baker for a spot on the final roster. Hayes was released on August 27, 2012, after the third preseason game.

On December 13, 2013, Hayes signed with the expansion Ottawa Redblacks of the Canadian Football League (CFL). He was moved to the practice roster before the start of the 2014 CFL season. He was released on August 12 but re-signed on August 19. Hayes dressed in three games for Ottawa in 2014, totaling six rushing attempts for six yards, two catches for one yard on four targets, and one fumble recovery. He was released on January 8, 2015.
