= Jim Tallas =

American politician (1937–2026)

Member of the Texas House of Representatives from the 26th district
- In office January 8, 1985 – January 10, 1995
- Preceded by: Tom DeLay
- Succeeded by: Charles F. Howard

Personal details
- Born: James Louis Tallas; February 28, 1937 Lissie, Texas, U.S.
- Died: June 1, 2026 (aged 89) Sugar Land, Texas, U.S.
- Party: Republican
- Spouse: Susan Diane (m. 1995; died. 2023)

James Louis Tallas (February 28, 1937 – June 1, 2026) was an American politician. A member of the Republican Party, he served in the Texas House of Representatives from 1985 to 1995.

== Early life and career ==
Tallas was born in Lissie, Texas on February 28, 1937, the son of Louis and Freda Tallas. He served in the United States Navy. After his discharge, he owned an insurance agency.

He served in the Texas House of Representatives from 1985 to 1995.

== Personal life and death ==
In 1995, Tallas married Susan Diane. Their marriage lasted until her death in 2023.

Tallas died in Sugar Land, Texas on June 1, 2026, at the age of 89.
