= Nottawa, Texas =

- Ghost town
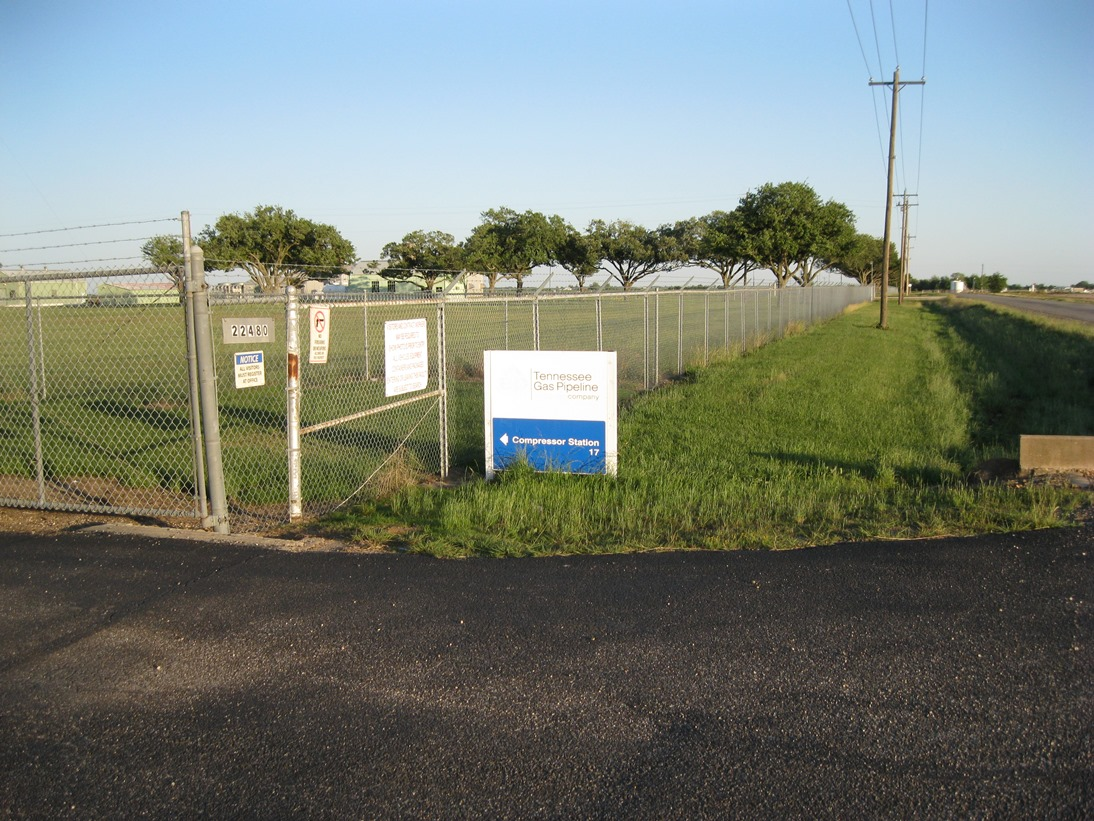
- Tennessee Gas Pipeline Company compressor station on FM 1164

- Location within the state of Texas Nottawa, Texas (the United States)
- Coordinates: 29°32′21″N 96°8′56″W
- Country: United States
- State: Texas
- County: Wharton
- Elevation: 135 ft (41 m)
- Time zone: UTC-6 (Central (CST))
  - Summer (DST): UTC-5 (CDT)
- ZIP code: 77435
- Area code: 979

Nottawa is a ghost town in northeastern Wharton County, in the U.S. state of Texas. The former community was situated in a rice-growing area midway between East Bernard and Lissie at the junction of U.S. Route 90 Alternate (US 90A) and Farm to Market Road 1164 (FM 1164). There was a gas compressor station on the site in 2016.

== History ==
The area was served by the Buffalo Bayou, Brazos and Colorado Railway since 1859, when the land was used as free range for cattle. Serious settlement did not begin until 1878, when Czechs moved into the area. Some English and Welsh were enticed by the New Philadelphia project, which settled what later became Lissie. After the first wave of settlement fizzled out, a second wave was begun by promoter John Linderholm of the South Texas Colonization Company, who bought 60,000 acres locally. Numbers of farmers from the Midwest arrived, but were disappointed that their familiar crops did poorly. Meanwhile, Nottawa was founded in the late 1880s and had one general store. The 1898 discovery that the area was particularly suited to rice production saved the situation. Soon, Wharton County was a major rice exporter.

In 1904, a post office opened in Nottawa, with Frank C. Boyden as postmaster. By 1914, the community had a blacksmith and the Darby and Reed General Store. Three years later, the Nottawa Common School No. 37 opened to children in grades one through six. Though the 1920 census reported only 25 residents, the 1926 county poll-tax register named 84 white and two black voters in Nottawa. The 1927 county poll-tax register listed 46 white and two black voters. The list included Anglo surnames (Anderson, Bennett, Smith, Wright) as well as Eastern European surnames (Brod, Chovatal, Srubar, Vacek). In 1945, the school merged with the East Bernard schools. The post office closed in 1930. With the advent of better highways, the inhabitants were able to travel to East Bernard to go shopping or to church. This resulted in the closing of the store in the late 1940s. The Tennessee Gas Pipeline Company opened a booster plant nearby in 1944 and several homes and a community center were built for its employees. Even though the plant still operated, the homes were mostly moved or sold in the 1970s. In the late 1970s, Occidental Petroleum set up a research farm on FM 1164 for the purpose of testing new varieties of rice and soybeans for Asian farmers. The research center closed in 1991 and the community of Nottawa ceased to exist.

== Geography ==
The site of Nottawa is located at the intersection of US 90A and FM 1164. East Bernard is 4.8 miles (7.7 km) to the east while Lissie is the same distance to the west. US 90A is south of and parallel with the Union Pacific Railroad. There are a few homes on County Road 270, which runs parallel to the railroad on its north side. Rice fields dominate the area, which is bracketed by Middle Bernard Creek on the east and West Bernard Creek on the west.
