= Charles F. Howard =

American politician

Charlie Howard

Member of the Texas House of Representatives from the 26th district
- In office 1995-2013
- Preceded by: Jim Tallas
- Succeeded by: Rick Miller

Personal details
- Born: May 30, 1942
- Died: May 2, 2017 (aged 74)
- Party: Republican
- Spouse: Jo Howard
- Education: Auburn University; Harvard Business School
- Profession: Real Estate Development

Charles F. Howard, known more commonly as Charlie Howard, (30 May 1942 – 2 May 2017) was an American politician and had been a member of the Texas House of Representatives since 1995. He was a member of the Republican Party.

Howard was a member of the American Legislative Exchange Council (ALEC), serving as Texas state leader.

== Early life and career ==
After moving to Sugar Land, Texas, a fast-growing suburb of Houston at the time, Charlie Howard became involved in the Sugar Land community, at one time serving as President of the Fort Bend Chamber of Commerce, which is highly influential in Fort Bend County and also of which he is a life member. He was also a founding director of the Fort Bend Economic Development Council and has served as President of The C. Howard Company, which specializes in real estate development. Prior experience included serving as Executive Vice President and Operating Officer of Sugarland Properties, which developed the First Colony master-planned community that now comprises most of the southern and southeastern areas of both Sugar Land and State House District 26. Additionally, Howard had been involved in numerous charitable, political, business, religious and educational organizations.

== Political career ==
In 1994, Charlie Howard ran in the Republican primary for District 26 in the Texas House of Representatives, which is demographically dominated by Sugar Land, against incumbent Republican Jim Tallas, who succeeded Tom DeLay in 1984 after DeLay made a successful run for Congress. Howard made an issue of Tallas' resistance to term limits, which was exhibited when the latter (as chair of a subcommittee) struck down a measure calling for term limits in the Texas Legislature. ^{[unfit]} Using this issue as the centerpiece of his campaign, Howard defeated Tallas with 71 percent of the vote in the primary, which was considered the real contest in the heavily Republican district, which has not elected a Democrat since 1978. In fact, Howard had faced a Democratic challenger only once, in 2000, winning with 70% of the vote, and had, with the exception of 1996 (when he faced only a token third-party candidate), won without opposition in other previous general election cycles.

After being elected, Howard had developed a largely conservative voting record in the Texas Legislature, and had received awards from various conservative groups, including the Christian Coalition, the Eagle Forum, Veterans of Foreign Wars, the American Family Association, and Concerned Women of America. He had also been recognized by various publications, including the Houston Chronicle, for his efforts in securing funds for the expansion of U.S. Highway 59, which runs through Sugar Land, and by the Republican Party of Texas for Howard's strong recognition of the party's values.

Because of his accomplishments in Austin, Texas Monthly named Charlie Howard among the "Worst Legislators" three times, ranking seventh worst in 1997 and fourth worst in 1999. In 2007, considered one of the worst legislative sessions in Texas history, Howard was named to the worst list for the third time in his seven sessions. .

In 2006, Howard fended off a primary challenge, the first time such a scenario occurred in his political career, but faced no opposition in the general election. In 2008, Howard easily won reelection over his two Republican primary opponents, educator Paula Stansell and student Norm Ley with 63% of the vote.

In 2013, Howard chose not to seek re-election due to health issues.

Howard died on May 2, 2017, after a long battle with cancer.

Preceded by Jim Tallas	Member of the Texas House of Representatives from District 26 (Sugarland); 1995-2013	Succeeded by Rick Miller
