= East Bernard Independent School District =

School district in Texas, United States

Address
- 723 College St East Bernard, Texas, 77435; United States

District information
- Type: Public
- Grades: PK–12
- Schools: 3
- NCES District ID: 4817830

Students and staff
- Students: 931 (2020–21)
- Teachers: 85.89 (FTE)
- Student–teacher ratio: 10.84

Other information
- Website: www.ebisd.org

East Bernard Independent School District (EBISD) is a public school district based in East Bernard, Texas, United States.

The district serves the City of East Bernard and the unincorporated area of Bonus. EBISD served Bonus since 1973. In 1956 the district absorbed the former Lissie school district. The district spans 182 square miles (470 km^{2}).

In 2009, the school district was rated "academically acceptable" by the Texas Education Agency.

== List of schools ==
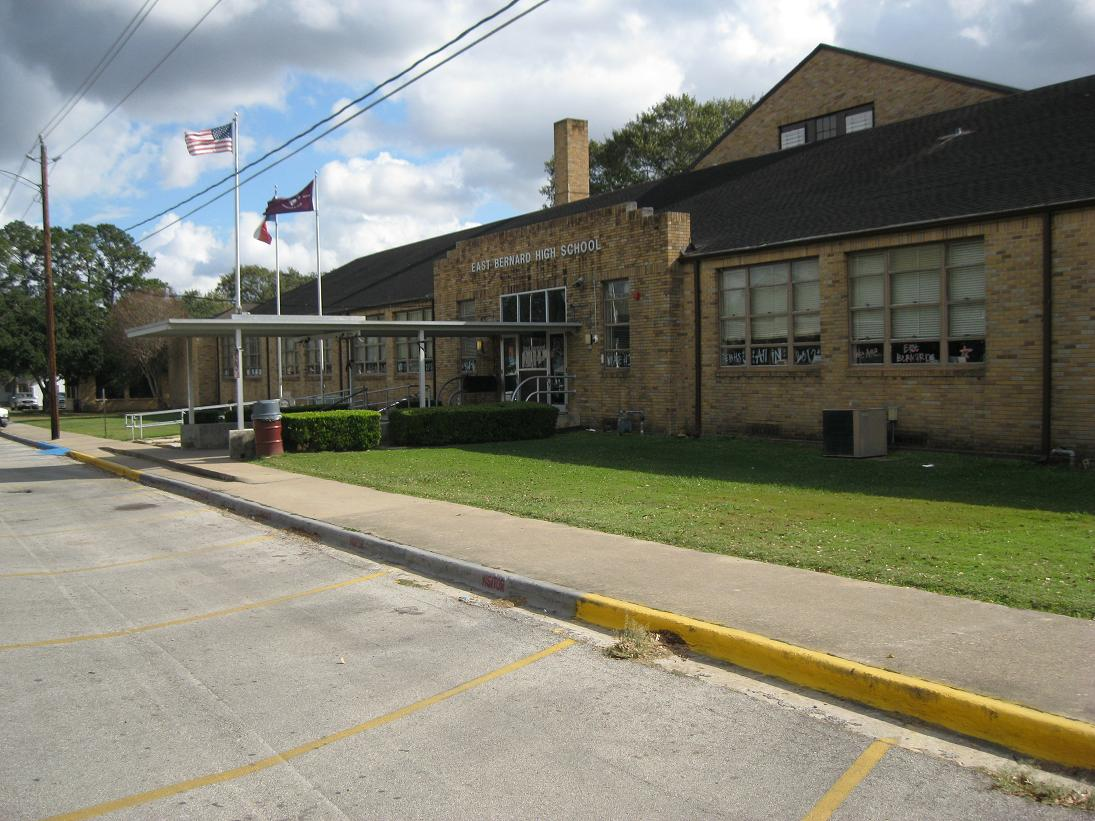
East Bernard High School

- East Bernard High School (Grades 9-12)
- East Bernard Junior High School (Grades 5-8)
- East Bernard Elementary School (Grades PK-4)
