= Matt Morgan (Texas politician) =

American politician

Member of the Texas House of Representatives from the 26th district
- Incumbent
- Assumed office January 14, 2025
- Preceded by: Jacey Jetton

Personal details
- Born: March 19, 1979 (age 47) Houston, Texas, U.S.
- Party: Republican
- Education: Sam Houston State University
- Profession: Insurance adjuster
- Website: Campaign website

Matt Morgan is an American politician. He represents the 26th district of the Texas House of Representatives.

== Life and career ==
Morgan was born in Houston, Texas. He attended Sam Houston State University in 2002, earning his Bachelor's degree. He is an insurance adjuster.

In March 2024, Morgan defeated incumbent Jacey Jetton in the Republican primary election for the 26th district of the Texas House of Representatives. In November 2024, Morgan defeated Daniel Lee, winning 59.2% of the vote. He assumed office on January 14, 2025.
