= Michael Bankston =

American football player (born 1970)

No. 63, 90
- Position: Defensive end

Personal information
- Born: March 12, 1970 (age 56); East Bernard, Texas, U.S.
- Listed height: 6 ft 5 in (1.96 m)
- Listed weight: 285 lb (129 kg)

Career information
- High school: East Bernard
- College: Sam Houston State
- NFL draft: 1992: 4th round, 100th overall pick

Career history
- Phoenix/Arizona Cardinals (1992–1997); Cincinnati Bengals (1998–2000); Washington Redskins (2001)*
- * Offseason or practice squad member only

Career NFL statistics
- Tackles: 622
- Sacks: 27
- Interceptions: 1
- Stats at Pro Football Reference

Michael Kane Bankston (March 12, 1970) is an American former professional football player who was a defensive tackle and defensive end for nine seasons in the National Football League (NFL). Bankston played for the Phoenix/Arizona Cardinals and Cincinnati Bengals. He was selected by the Cardinals in the fourth round of the 1992 NFL draft with the 100th overall pick. He played college football for the Sam Houston State Bearkats.
