= East Bernard, Texas =

- City
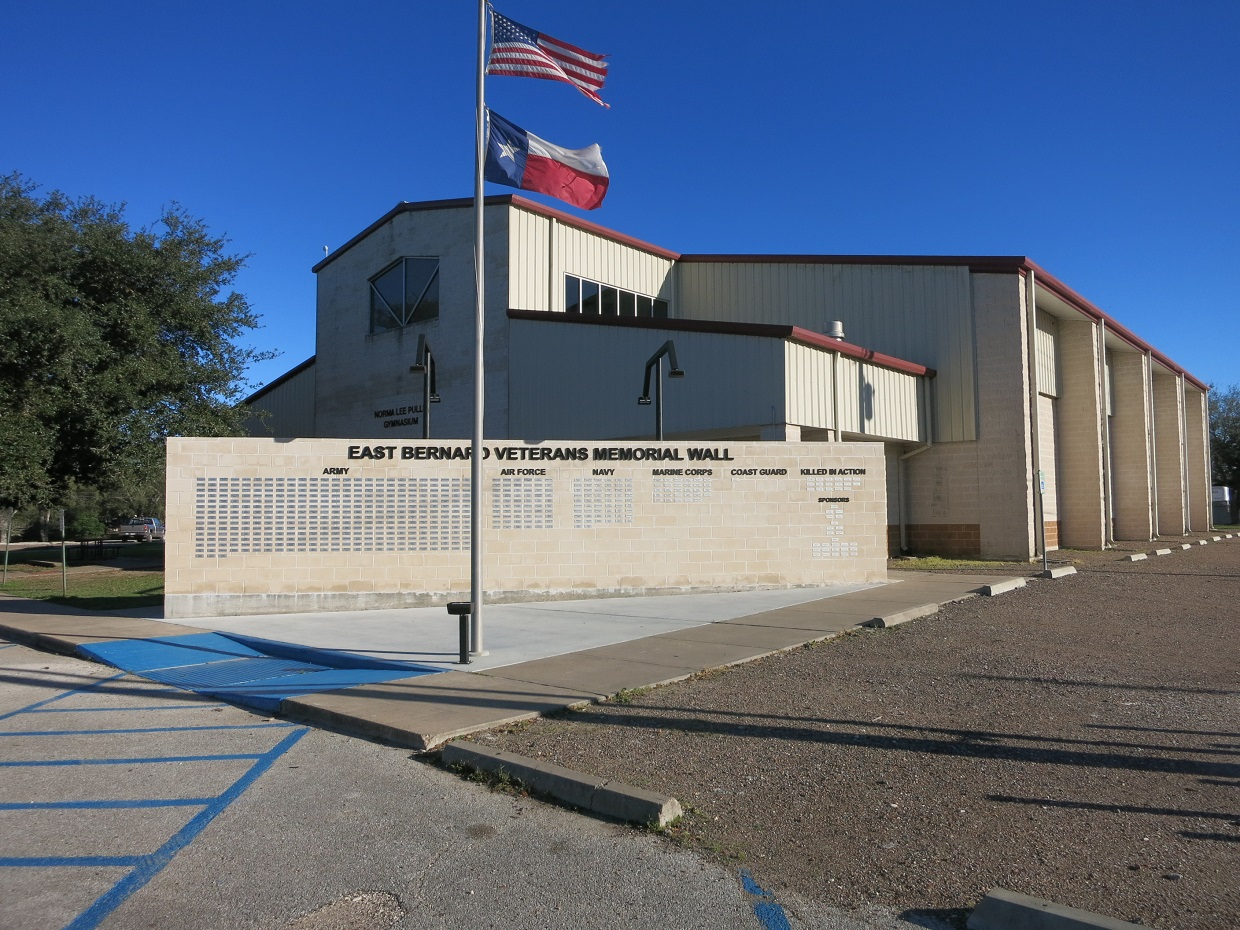
- Veterans Memorial at Norma Lee Pullen Gymnasium
- Nickname: EB
- Location of East Bernard, Texas
- Coordinates: 29°31′52″N 96°04′16″W
- Country: United States
- State: Texas
- County: Wharton

Area
  - Total: 3.79 sq mi (9.82 km^{2})
  - Land: 3.78 sq mi (9.80 km^{2})
  - Water: 0.0077 sq mi (0.02 km^{2})
- Elevation: 125 ft (38 m)

Population (2020)
  - Total: 2,218
  - Density: 618.7/sq mi (238.88/km^{2})
- Time zone: UTC-6 (Central (CST))
  - Summer (DST): UTC-5 (CDT)
- ZIP code: 77435
- Area code: 979
- FIPS code: 48-21988
- GNIS feature ID: 1334880
- Website: Official website

East Bernard is a city in Wharton County, Texas, United States. The population was 2,218 at the 2020 census. U.S. Highway 90 Alternate (US 90A) and Texas State Highway 60 (SH 60) intersect within the city limits. East Bernard has its own school district, two auto dealerships and a number of other businesses. The San Bernard River flows past the city's eastern side.

== History ==
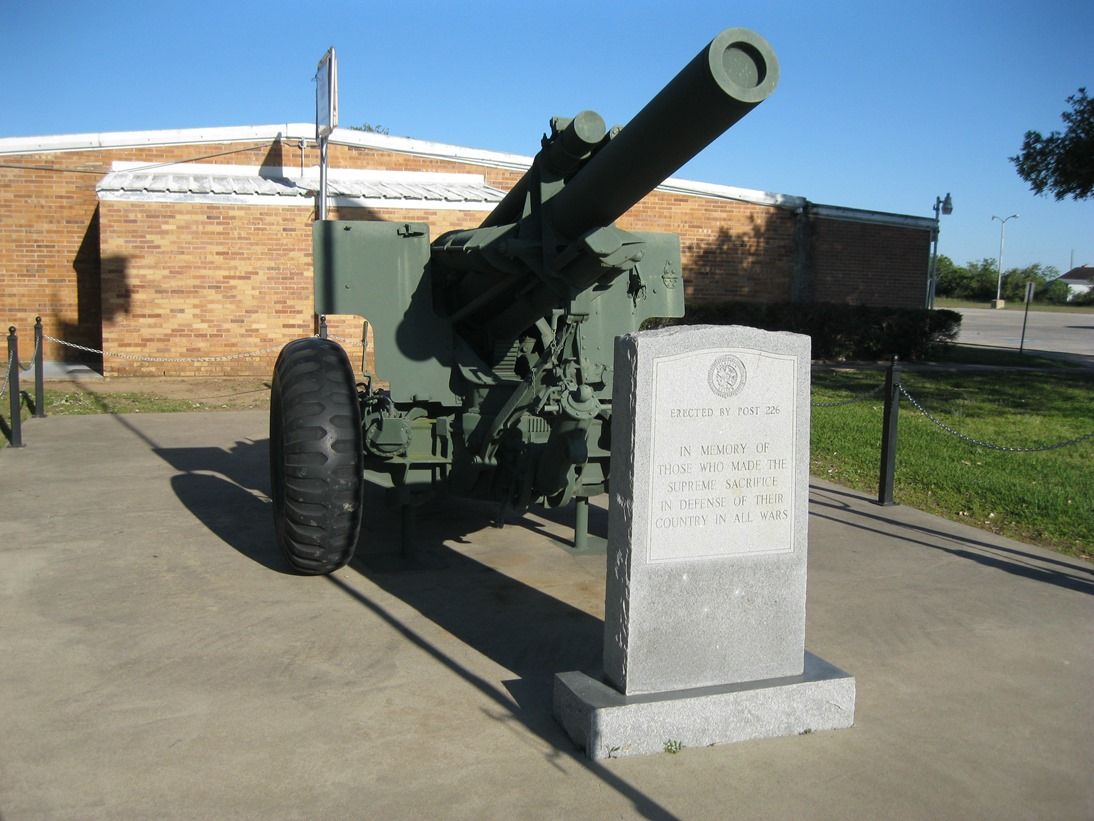
M101 howitzer at American Legion Post 226

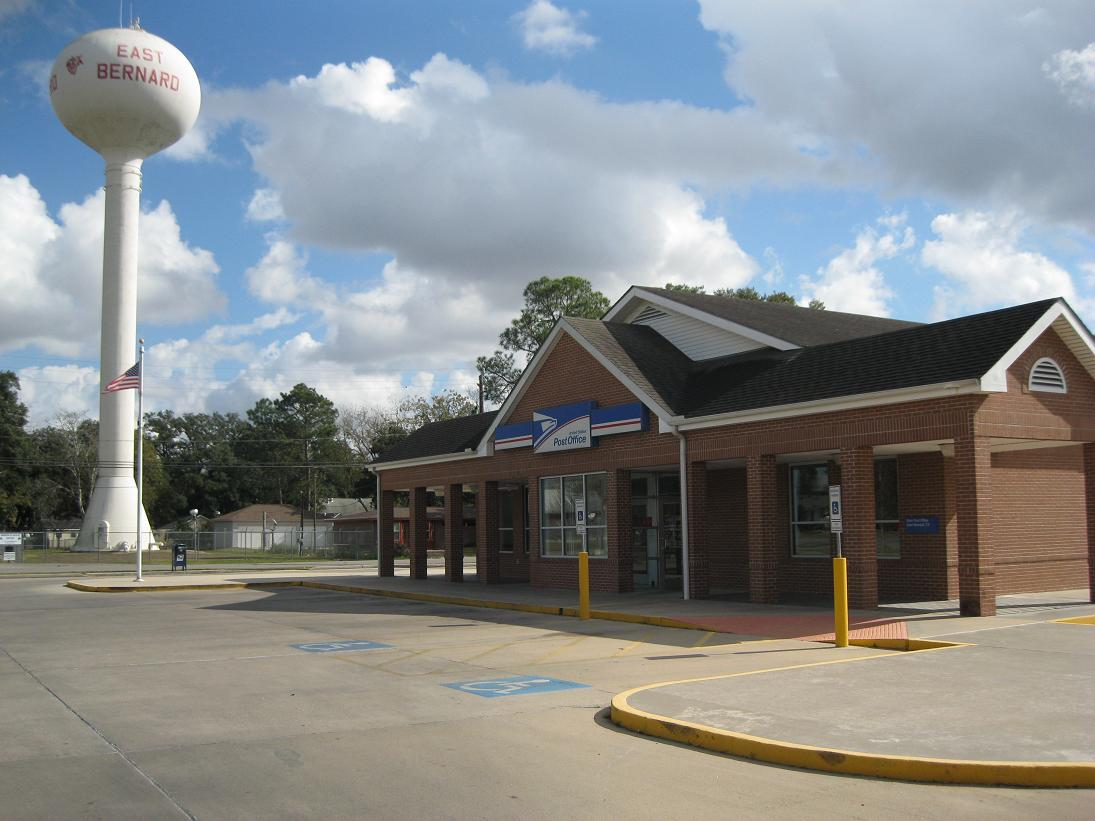
US Post Office and water tower

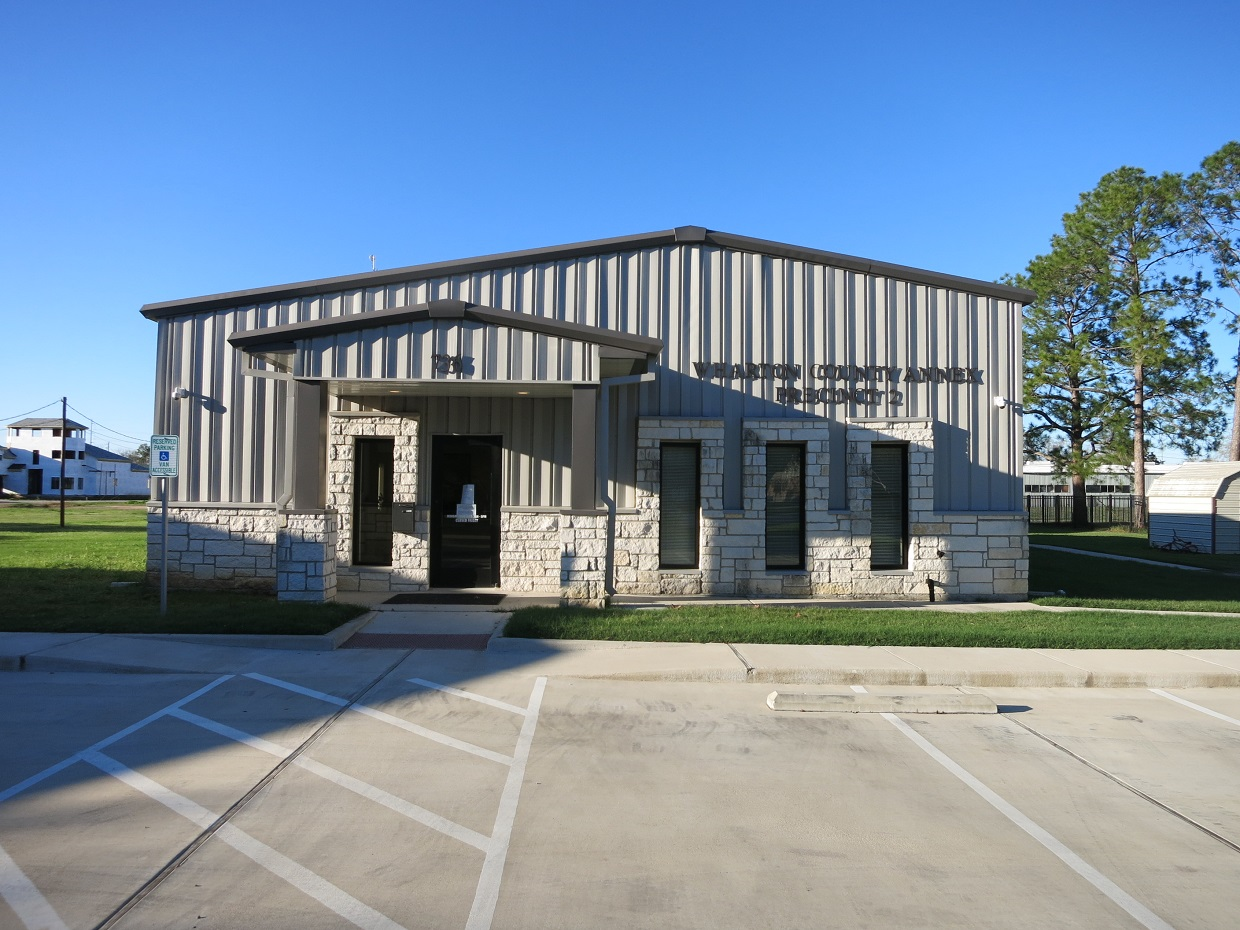
Wharton County Precinct 2 Annex

In 2000, East Bernard incorporated. As of 2007, East Bernard is one of Texas's newest cities.

East Bernard is on the west side of the San Bernard River at the intersection of State Highway 60 and U.S. Highway 90A, fifteen miles (24 km) north of Wharton in northeast Wharton County. The community was originally on the east side of the river, where Jethro Spivi built the first residence circa 1850; hence the name East Bernard. Settlement was slow until 1859 and the arrival of the Buffalo Bayou, Brazos and Colorado Railway. A bridge was built, and the depot, Bernard Station, though originally located on the east bank of the river, was moved by 1869 to the west side, to the site of East Bernard's future Main Street. The rest of the town grew up around the railway. The first post office was established in 1866, but the community was probably not officially named East Bernard until 1874.

After the Civil War, the community began to grow rapidly, as new settlers arrived with British surnames. Although Joseph Habermacher operated a store and saddle shop in Bernard Station sometime before 1867, the main influx of German and Slavic immigrants came after the 1880s. In the mid-1890s, the farming community had a population of 150, and businesses included a steam gin, a gristmill, a telegraph office, and two general stores.

The first church in East Bernard was established in 1893, when German Methodist settlers dismantled their church in Content, three miles (4.8 km) south of Weimar, and moved it by rail to East Bernard, where it was rebuilt in 1909. Catholic and Baptist congregations started holding services in private homes around 1900; their sanctuaries were completed between 1905 and 1907. The present Catholic church, built in 1925, has stained glass windows from Czechoslovakia, mosaics from Munich, a statue of St. Anthony from Italy, and statuary carved in the German Tyrol. An Assembly of God congregation began Pentecostal services in a private home in 1970 and moved into a new building by 1978.

East Bernard has had several newspapers, the first of which, the East Bernard Tribune, began in the 1920s. In the late 1980s, the town was served by a weekly paper with the same name. Riverside Hall, built in 1927 on the east bank of the river, became a popular dance pavilion, where Paul Whiteman was once featured. In the early years of the settlement, pioneer merchants H. P. Stockton and John G. Leveridge had operated a banking business in the back of Leveridge's General Store; by 1907, they had organized the Union State Bank. R. B. Boettcher purchased the controlling stock in 1911. In 1960 J. R. Peace, owner of a large furniture company, helped organize a chamber of commerce, which, since East Bernard was unincorporated, performed much of the duties of a city government. In the 1980s East Bernard's economy, though centered on agriculture, also included a gas pipeline company, a major kite-manufacturer, and several research corporations. In 1988 the population of 1,500 was served by sixty-three businesses. In 1990 the population was 1,544, and in 2000 it had grown to 1,729.

East Bernard won the Texas state football championship in 1977 and 2012.

East Bernard is widely known across the state of Texas as a volleyball powerhouse. In 2017, author Putt Riddle recorded 22 schools in Texas with at least four state championship titles in the book Above the Net - 50 Years of the Best Volleyball in Texas. The East Bernard Brahamarettes tied for the highest number of state championships, with 13 wins.

== Geography ==
According to the United States Census Bureau, the city had a total area of 1.4 square miles (3.6 km^{2}). Since its incorporation as a city in 2003, the total area increased has 3.8 square miles (9.8 km^{2}), all land.

The San Bernard River flows generally from north to south through the area. The stream forms the eastern city limit and also marks the boundary between Wharton County to the west and Fort Bend County to the east. US 90A runs through the city, paralleling the Union Pacific Railroad, going east to Rosenberg in Fort Bend County and west to Eagle Lake in Colorado County. SH 60 goes north to Wallis in Austin County and south to Wharton. Farm to Market Road 1164 starts at SH 60 south, heads southwest and then northwest to end at US 90A at the former site of Nottawa. Farm to Market Road 2919 (FM 2919) also begins at SH 60 and goes east, forming the southern boundary of East Bernard. Eventually, FM 2919 turns to the southeast, crosses the San Bernard and ends at Kendleton in Fort Bend County. East Bernard stands near the eastern edge of the Lissie prairie, a significant rice-growing area.

== Demographics ==
Historical population
Census	Pop.	Note	%±
1970	1,159		—
1980	1,735		49.7%
1990	1,544		−11.0%
2000	1,729		12.0%
2010	2,272		31.4%
2020	2,218		−2.4%
U.S. Decennial Census; 1850–1900 1910; 1920 1930 1940; 1950 1960 1970; 1980 1990 2000; 2010

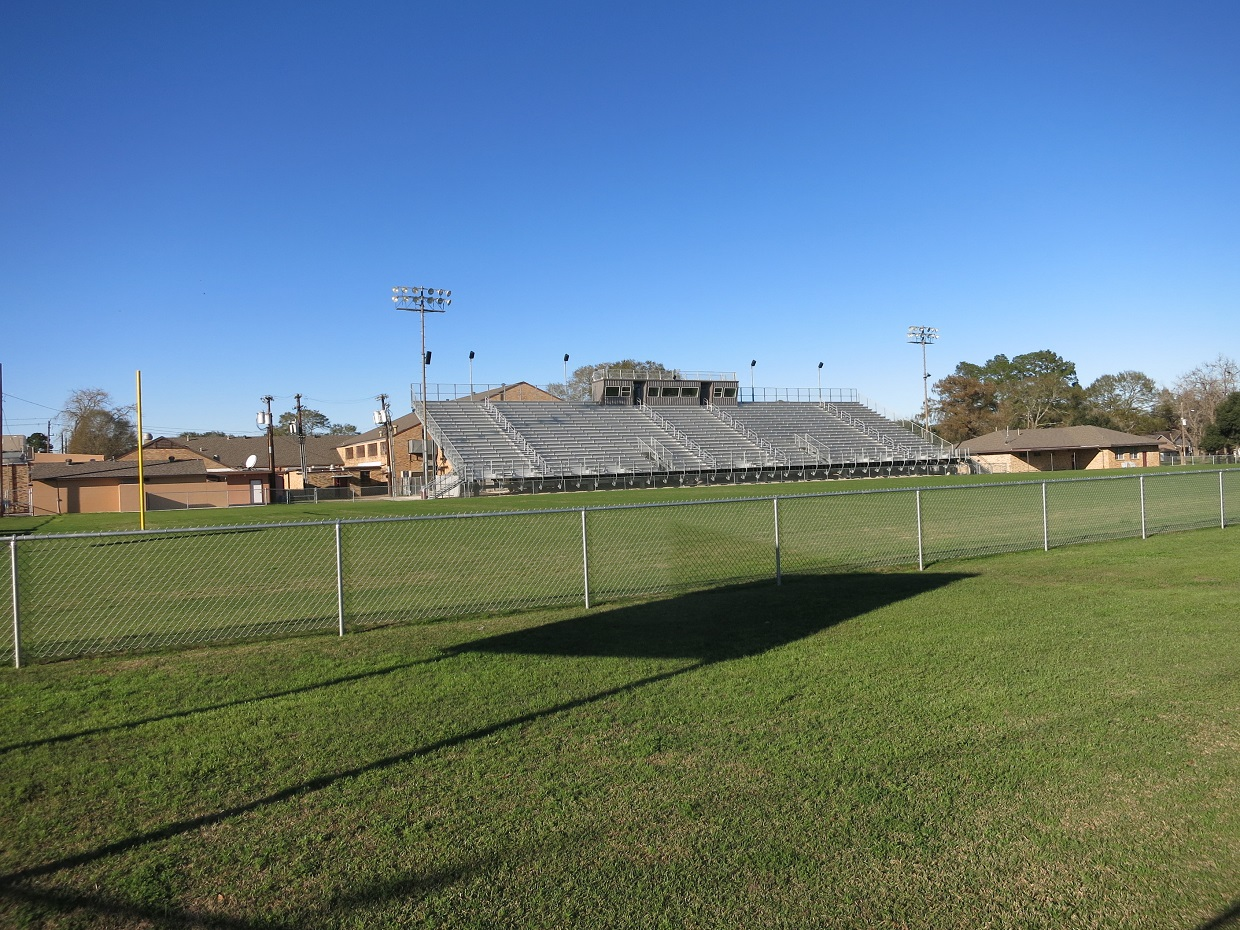
Memorial Stadium

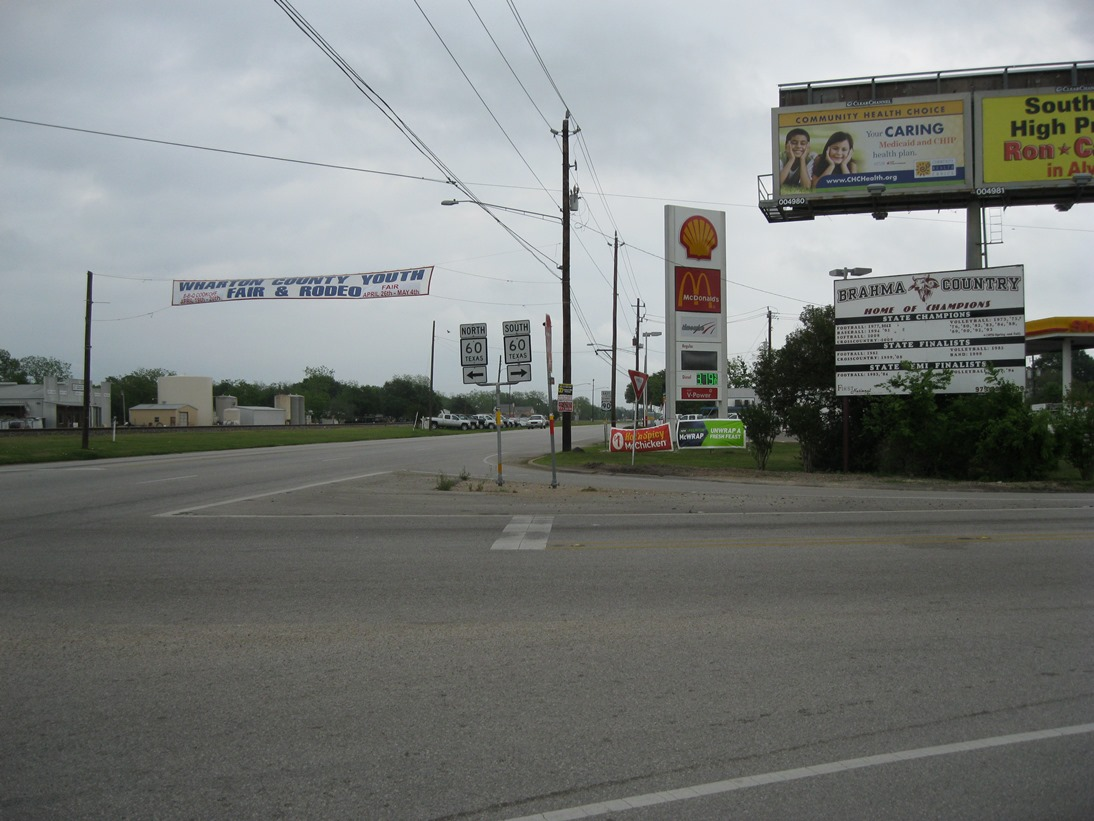
Brahma Country sign

East Bernard first appeared as an unincorporated community in the 1970 U.S. census and as a census-designated place in the 1980 United States census. The city of East Bernard was incorporated in 2003 from most of the deleted East Bernard CDP and additional area.

=== Racial and ethnic composition ===
East Bernard city, Texas – Racial and ethnic composition Note: the US Census treats Hispanic/Latino as an ethnic category. This table excludes Latinos from the racial categories and assigns them to a separate category. Hispanics/Latinos may be of any race.
Race / Ethnicity (NH = Non-Hispanic)	Pop 2000	Pop 2010	Pop 2020	% 2000	% 2010	% 2020
White alone (NH)	1,201	1,628	1,566	69.46%	71.65%	70.60%
Black or African American alone (NH)	45	57	37	2.60%	2.51%	1.67%
Native American or Alaska Native alone (NH)	3	1	4	0.17%	0.04%	0.18%
Asian alone (NH)	3	8	6	0.17%	0.35%	0.27%
Pacific Islander alone (NH)	0	0	0	0.00%	0.00%	0.00%
Some Other Race alone (NH)	0	1	3	0.00%	0.04%	0.14%
Mixed race or Multiracial (NH)	9	16	44	0.52%	0.70%	1.98%
Hispanic or Latino (any race)	468	561	558	27.07%	24.69%	25.16%
Total	1,729	2,272	2,218	100.00%	100.00%	100.00%

=== 2020 census ===
As of the 2020 census, East Bernard had a population of 2,218. The median age was 42.1 years. 22.5% of residents were under the age of 18 and 20.4% of residents were 65 years of age or older. For every 100 females there were 99.1 males, and for every 100 females age 18 and over there were 95.5 males age 18 and over.

0.0% of residents lived in urban areas, while 100.0% lived in rural areas.

There were 856 households in East Bernard, of which 32.7% had children under the age of 18 living in them. Of all households, 57.9% were married-couple households, 14.4% were households with a male householder and no spouse or partner present, and 23.6% were households with a female householder and no spouse or partner present. About 21.6% of all households were made up of individuals and 11.8% had someone living alone who was 65 years of age or older.

There were 935 housing units, of which 8.4% were vacant. The homeowner vacancy rate was 2.2% and the rental vacancy rate was 9.8%.

Racial composition as of the 2020 census
Race	Number	Percent
White	1,763	79.5%
Black or African American	42	1.9%
American Indian and Alaska Native	10	0.5%
Asian	9	0.4%
Native Hawaiian and Other Pacific Islander	0	0.0%
Some other race	179	8.1%
Two or more races	215	9.7%
Hispanic or Latino (of any race)	558	25.2%

=== 2000 census ===
As of the census of 2000, there were 1,729 people, 631 households, and 487 families residing in the city. The population density was 1,253.0 inhabitants per square mile (483.8/km^{2}). There were 662 housing units at an average density of 479.7 per square mile (185.2/km^{2}). The racial makeup of the city was 81.3% White, 2.72% African American, 0.17% Native American, 0.17% Asian, 0.23% Pacific Islander, 13.59% from other races, and 1.68% from two or more races. Hispanic or Latino of any race were 27.07% of the population.

There were 631 households, out of which 37.2% had children under the age of 18 living with them, 61.0% were married couples living together, 12.7% had a female householder with no husband present, and 22.8% were non-families. 20.4% of all households were made up of individuals, and 9.8% had someone living alone who was 65 years of age or older. The average household size was 2.74 and the average family size was 3.13.

In the city, the population was spread out, with 27.4% under the age of 18, 8.9% from 18 to 24, 27.7% from 25 to 44, 22.4% from 45 to 64, and 13.5% who were 65 years of age or older. The median age was 35 years. For every 100 females, there were 99.9 males. For every 100 females age 18 and over, there were 93.4 males.

The median income for a household in the city was $35,500, and the median income for a family was $42,786. Males had a median income of $29,402 versus $23,913 for females. The per capita income for the city was $16,011. About 10.3% of families and 12.2% of the population were below the poverty line, including 17.2% of those under age 18 and 5.6% of those age 65 or over.

== Education ==
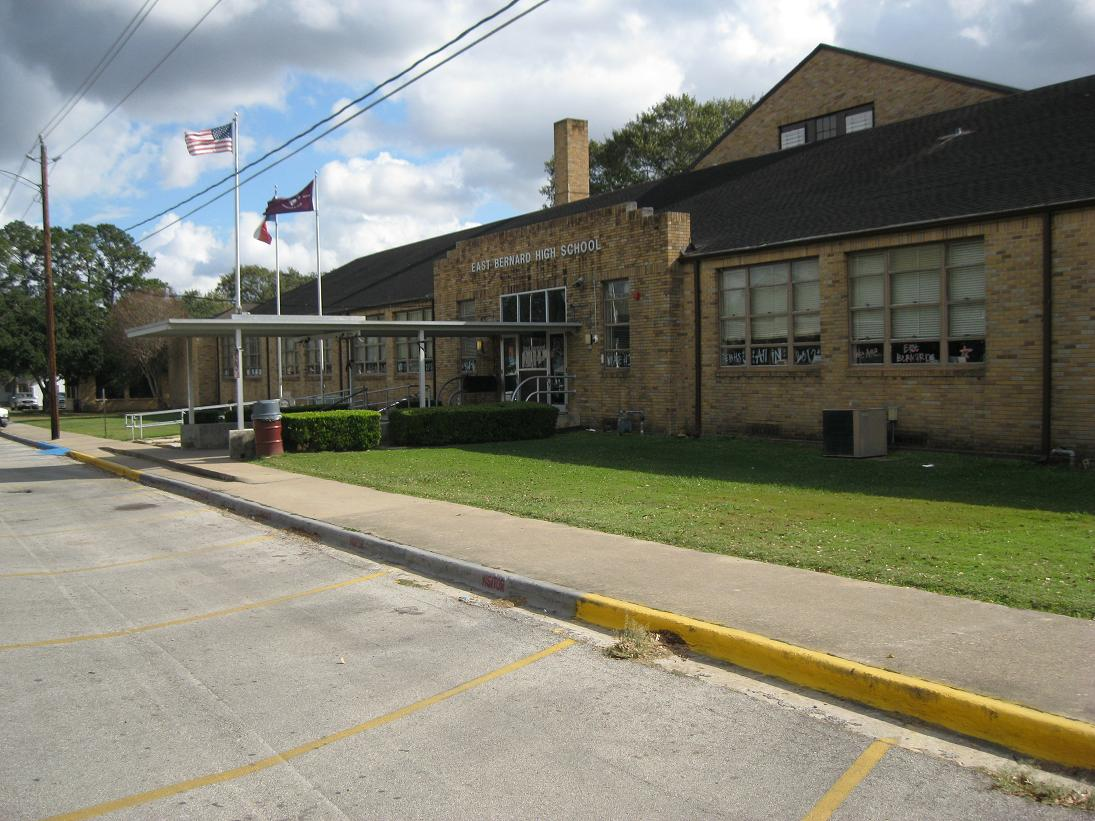
East Bernard High School (in 2012)

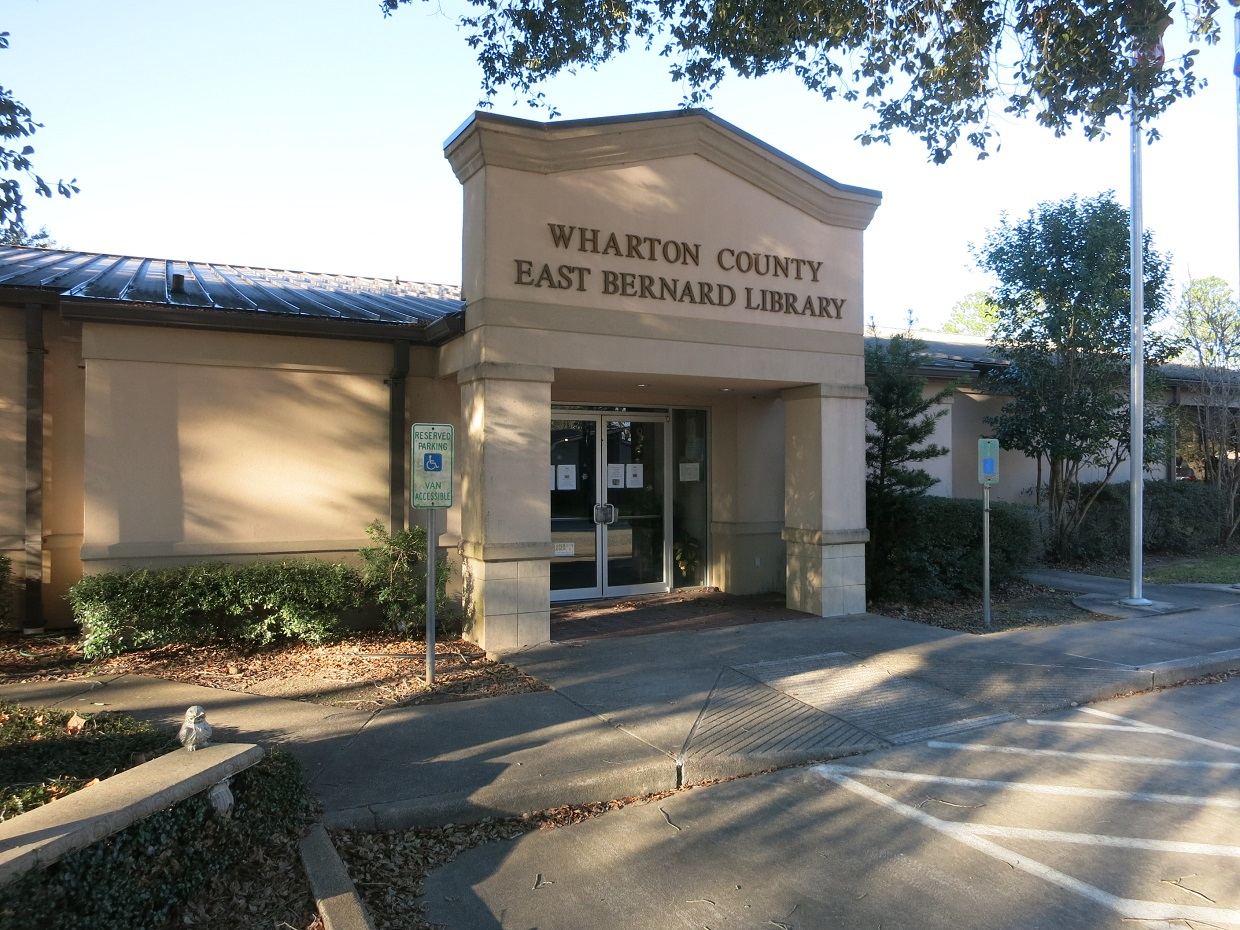
East Bernard Library

The City of East Bernard is served by the East Bernard Independent School District and home to the East Bernard High School Brahmas. The first school building was erected around 1888 one mile (1.6 km) north of the depot; by 1912 a brick high school had been built in town. Around 1916 East Bernard became an independent school district, and by 1956 nearby schools in Nottawa, Muldoon, Bernard Prairie, and Lissie were consolidated with the East Bernard school. A Texas historical marker now marks the site of the original school.

The graduating class of 2015 marked the 100th anniversary of the first graduating class in the school's history. Some of the students of this graduating class included relatives of some of the original settlers when the town was first formed. Such names included "John Failla", "Michael Zapalac", "Patrick Marik" and "Brian Barta".

Wharton County Public Library operates the East Bernard Library.

== Media ==
The city formerly had weekly newspaper, the East Bernard Express, which ceased publication in 2026 and merged with the Wharton County Leader-Journal.

== Infrastructure ==
=== Transportation ===
- State Highway 60
- U.S. Highway 90 Alternate
- Farm to Market Road 1164
- Farm to Market Road 2919

== Notable people ==
- Michael Bankston, former NFL defensive tackle and defensive end who played for the Arizona Cardinals and Cincinnati Bengals.
- Shane Lechler, football punter who played for the Oakland Raiders and Houston Texans in the National Football League from 2000 to 2017.
