= Shane Lechler =

American football player (born 1976)

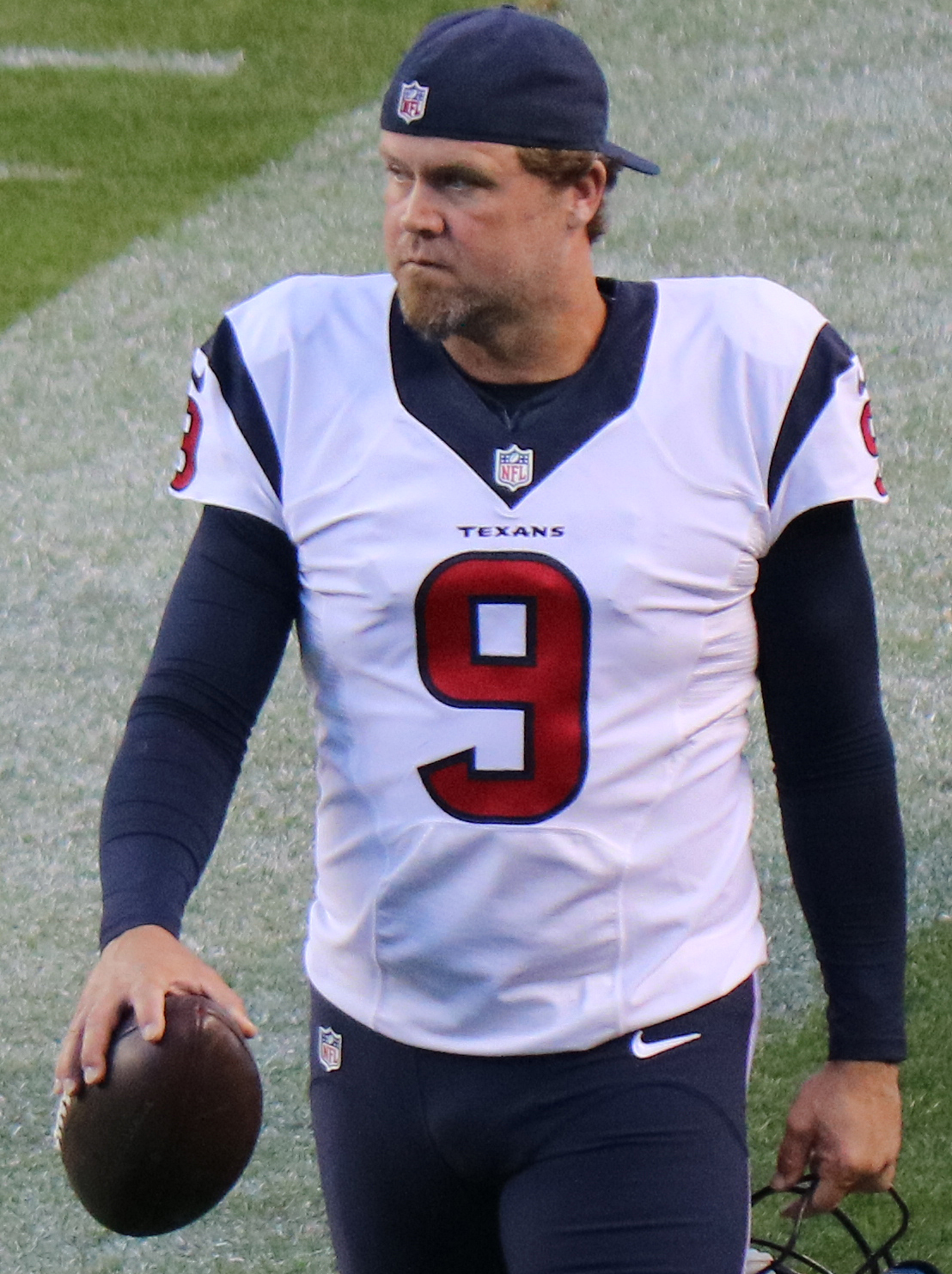
- Lechler with the Houston Texans in 2016

No. 9
- Position: Punter

Personal information
- Born: August 7, 1976 (age 50); East Bernard, Texas, U.S.
- Listed height: 6 ft 2 in (1.88 m)
- Listed weight: 240 lb (109 kg)

Career information
- High school: East Bernard
- College: Texas A&M (1996–1999)
- NFL draft: 2000: 5th round, 142nd overall pick

Career history
- Oakland Raiders (2000–2012); Houston Texans (2013–2017)

Awards and highlights
- 6× First-team All-Pro (2000, 2003, 2004, 2008–2010); 3× Second-team All-Pro (2001, 2007, 2011); 7× Pro Bowl (2001, 2004, 2007–2011); 4× NFL punting yards leader (2003, 2008, 2009, 2017); Golden Toe Award (2009); NFL 2000s All-Decade Team; NFL 2010s All-Decade Team; NFL 100th Anniversary All-Time Team; PFWA All-Rookie Team (2000); 2× First-team All-American (1998, 1999); Second-team All-American (1997); 3× First-team All-Big 12 (1997–1999); NFL records: Most career punting touchbacks: 178

Career NFL statistics
- Punts: 1,444
- Punting yards: 68,678
- Average punt: 47.6
- Inside 20: 469
- Extra points attempted: 7
- Extra points made: 7
- Kickoffs: 19
- Kickoff yards: 1,210
- Stats at Pro Football Reference

Edward Shane Lechler (/ˈlɛklər/; born August 7, 1976) is an American former professional football player who played as a punter for 18 seasons in the National Football League (NFL). He played college football for the Texas A&M Aggies and was selected by the Oakland Raiders in the fifth round of the 2000 NFL draft. Lechler also played for the Houston Texans.

Regarded as one of the greatest punters in NFL history, Lechler was named an All-Pro nine times during his career, and made seven Pro Bowls. He led the league in punting average five times and was the NFL's all-time leader in career punting average for nearly two decades. Lechler was one of two punters named to the NFL 100th Anniversary All-Time Team, along with Hall of Famer Ray Guy.

== Early life ==
Lechler attended East Bernard High School in East Bernard, Texas, and was a standout in football, basketball, golf, and baseball. As a quarterback, punter, and placekicker, Lechler led East Bernard to the state quarterfinals during his senior year, completing 87 of 101 (86.1%) passes for 1,640 yards and 11 touchdowns. In his high school career, Lechler passed for nearly 5,000 yards and averaged 41.6 yards per punt. His longest punt in high school was 85 yards.

== College career ==
Lechler attended Texas A&M University and played for the Aggies football team from 1996 to 1999. A versatile player, he was not only the Aggies' punter but also kicked off, was the long field goal kicker, served as the holder for short field goals and PATs, and was the emergency quarterback. As a junior, he completed a 29-yard pass on a fake punt against Baylor and threw a touchdown pass to Dan Campbell on a fake field goal in a hard-fought 17–10 win against Texas Tech.

When injuries depleted the depth chart, Lechler served as the backup quarterback for the 1998 Big 12 championship game. At one point in the game, the Aggies' last healthy quarterback, Branndon Stewart, appeared shaken and a nervous-looking Lechler threw warmup passes on the sideline. Stewart was able to stay in the game, however, and led the Aggies to a 36–33 victory over Kansas State, earning the Aggies their only Big 12 Championship. Because of his contributions in so many facets of the game, coach R. C. Slocum called Lechler "the team's most valuable player."

Lechler started his career off strong at Texas A&M, earning Freshman All-America honors in 1996 with a punting average of 42.7 yards. After his sophomore season, Lechler was named to the All-Big 12 team after breaking the Aggie single-season record with an average of 47.0 yards per punt. He was named to The Sporting News All-America team as a junior in 1998, and was also an Associated Press first team All-American honors as a senior in 1999, a year where his 46.5 yards per punt is second in the record books only to his own sophomore record of 47.0. Lechler is the NCAA record holder for career punt average with a mark of 44.7 yards per punt. Lechler had only one punt blocked, against Ohio State in the 1999 Sugar Bowl.

During his time at Texas A&M, Lechler was roommates with future NFL head coach Dan Campbell and future TexAgs co-owner Billy Liucci.

== Professional career ==
Pre-draft measurables
Height	Weight
6 ft 1 7/8 in (1.88 m)	234 lb (106 kg)
Values from NFL Combine

=== Oakland Raiders ===
==== 2000 ====
Lechler was selected in the fifth round (142nd overall) of the 2000 NFL draft. He was the only punter selected that year.

On September 3, 2000, in the season opener against the San Diego Chargers, Lechler made his NFL debut and had a season-high 10 punts for a season-high 424 yards (42.4 average) as the Raiders won 9–6. During a Week 10 49–31 victory over the Kansas City Chiefs, he converted all seven extra-point attempts. Two weeks later against the New Orleans Saints, Lechler had four punts for 219 yards for a season-high 54.75 average in the 31–22 road victory.

Lechler finished his rookie year with 65 punts for 2,984 yards for a 45.91 average. The Raiders finished atop the AFC West with a 12–4 record and qualified for the playoffs. He was named to the NFL All-Rookie Team and earned First Team All-Pro honors. Lechler made his playoff debut in the Divisional Round against the Miami Dolphins and finished the 27–0 shutout victory with five punts for 234 yards (46.8 average). During the AFC Championship Game against the Baltimore Ravens, Lechler had seven punts for 315 yards (45.00 average) in the 16–3 loss.

==== 2001 ====
During the season-opening 27–24 loss to the Chiefs, Lechler had four punts for 185 yards (46.25 average) in the 27–24 road victory. Two weeks later against the Dolphins, he recorded a season-high seven punts for a season-high 345 yards for a 49.29 average in the 18–15 road loss. Three weeks later against the Indianapolis Colts, Lechler had five punts for 262 yards for a season-high 52.4 average in the 23–18 road victory. He earned his first Pro Bowl nomination.

Lechler finished his second professional season with 73 punts for 3,375 yards for a 46.23 average. The Raiders finished atop the AFC West for the second consecutive season with a 10–6 record and made the playoffs, but their season ended in a 16–13 road loss to the New England Patriots during the Divisional Round.

==== 2002 ====
Lechler's third professional season saw the Raiders have a lot of success. During a Week 4 52–25 victory over the Tennessee Titans, he punted thrice for 134 yards and a 44.67 average in his season debut. In the next game against the Buffalo Bills, Lechler had five punts for a season-high 250 yards for a 50.00 average during the 49–31 road victory. During a Week 16 28–16 victory over the Denver Broncos, he had a season-high six punts for 244 yards for a 40.67 average. Overall, in the regular season, Lechler totaled 53 punts for 2,251 yards for a 42.47 average.

The Raiders finished atop the AFC West for the third consecutive year with an 11–5 record and made the playoffs. After beating the New York Jets in the Divisional Round and the Titans in the AFC Championship Game, Lechler appeared in his first Super Bowl. During Super Bowl XXXVII against the Tampa Bay Buccaneers, he had five punts for 195 yards for a 39.00 average in the 48–21 loss.

==== 2003 ====
During the season-opening 25–20 road loss to the Titans, Lechler recorded seven punts for 353 net yards for a 50.43 average. During a Week 5 24–21 road loss to the Chicago Bears, he punted thrice for 166 yards for a season-high 55.33 average. In the regular-season finale against the Chargers, he had a season-high nine punts for a season-high 424 yards for a 47.11 average as during the 21–14 road loss. Lechler recorded a 73-yard punt, which was the longest by any punter in the NFL for the 2003 season.

Lechler finished the 2003 season with 96 punts for 4,503 yards for a 46.91 average as the Raiders finished the season with a 4–12 record. He was named as a First Team All-Pro for the second time.

==== 2004 ====
Lechler started his fifth professional season in the season-opening 24–21 road loss to the Pittsburgh Steelers, punting thrice for 132 yards and a 44 average. During a Week 6 31–3 loss to the Broncos, Lechler had a season-high seven punts for a season-high 333 yards for a 47.57 average. Three weeks later against the Carolina Panthers, he punted thrice for 167 yards for a season-high 55.67 average in the 27–24 road victory.

Lechler finished the season with 73 punts for 3,409 yards for a 46.7 average as the Raiders finished with a 5–11 record. He earned a second Pro Bowl nomination and was named as a First Team All-Pro for the third time.

==== 2005 ====
In the season-opening 30–20 road loss to the Patriots on Thursday Night Football, Lechler had eight punts for 356 yards for a 44.5 average. On Christmas Eve against the Broncos, he recorded five punts for 295 yards for a season-high 59.00 average. On New Year's Eve against the New York Giants, Lechler had a season-high nine punts for a season-high 421 yards for a 46.78 average.

Lechler finished the 2005 season with 82 punts for 3,744 yards for a 45.66 average as the Raiders finished with a 4–12 record.

==== 2006 ====
During the season-opening 27–0 shutout loss to the Chargers on Monday Night Football, Lechler recorded nine punts for 420 yards for a 46.67 average. During a Week 9 16–0 shutout loss to the Seattle Seahawks on Monday Night Football, he had a season-high 10 punts for a season-high 450 yards for a 45.00 average.

Lechler finished the 2006 season with totaled 77 punts for 3,660 yards for a 47.53 average as the Raiders struggled to a 2–14 record.

==== 2007 ====
Lechler and placekicker Sebastian Janikowski in 2007

During a narrow Week 7 12–10 loss to the Chiefs, Lechler had a season-high nine punts for a season-high 461 yards for a 51.22 average. Three weeks later against the Bears, he had nine punts for 433 yards for a 48.11 average in the 17–6 loss.

Lechler finished the 2007 season with 73 punts for 3,585 yards for a 49.11 average as the Raiders finished with a 4–12 record. During the 2008 Pro Bowl, he punted for 55 yards.

==== 2008 ====
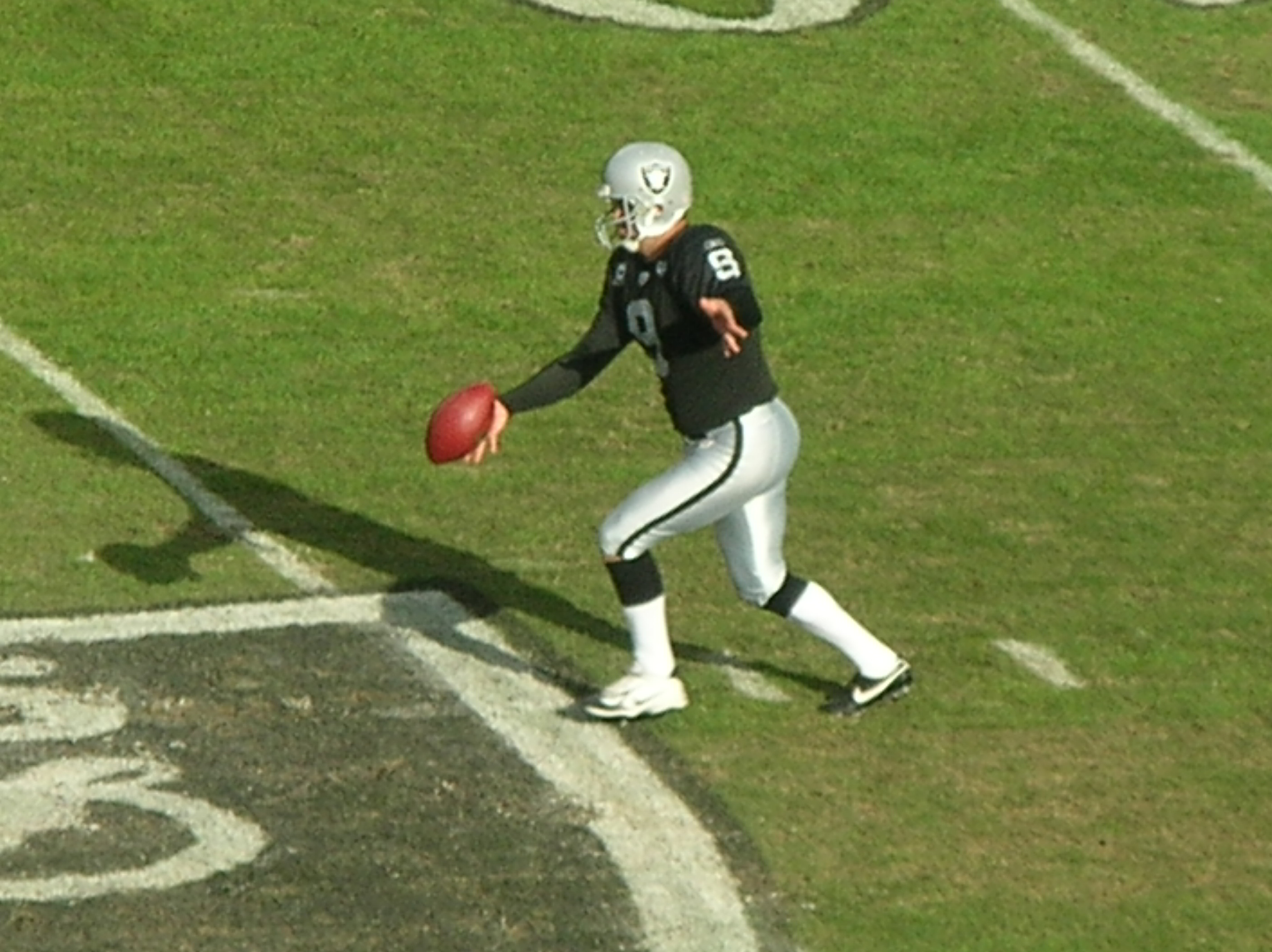
Lechler punting in 2008

During the season-opening 41–14 loss to the Broncos on Monday Night Football, Lechler recorded five punts for 255 yards for a 51.00 average. During a Week 10 17–6 loss to the Panthers, he had a season-high 11 punts for a season-high 556 yards for a 50.55 average. Two weeks later against the Broncos, Lechler punted thrice for 176 yards for a season-high 58.67 average in the 31–10 road loss.

Lechler finished the 2008 season with 90 punts for 4,391 yards for a 48.79 average as the Raiders finished with a 5–11 record.

==== 2009 ====
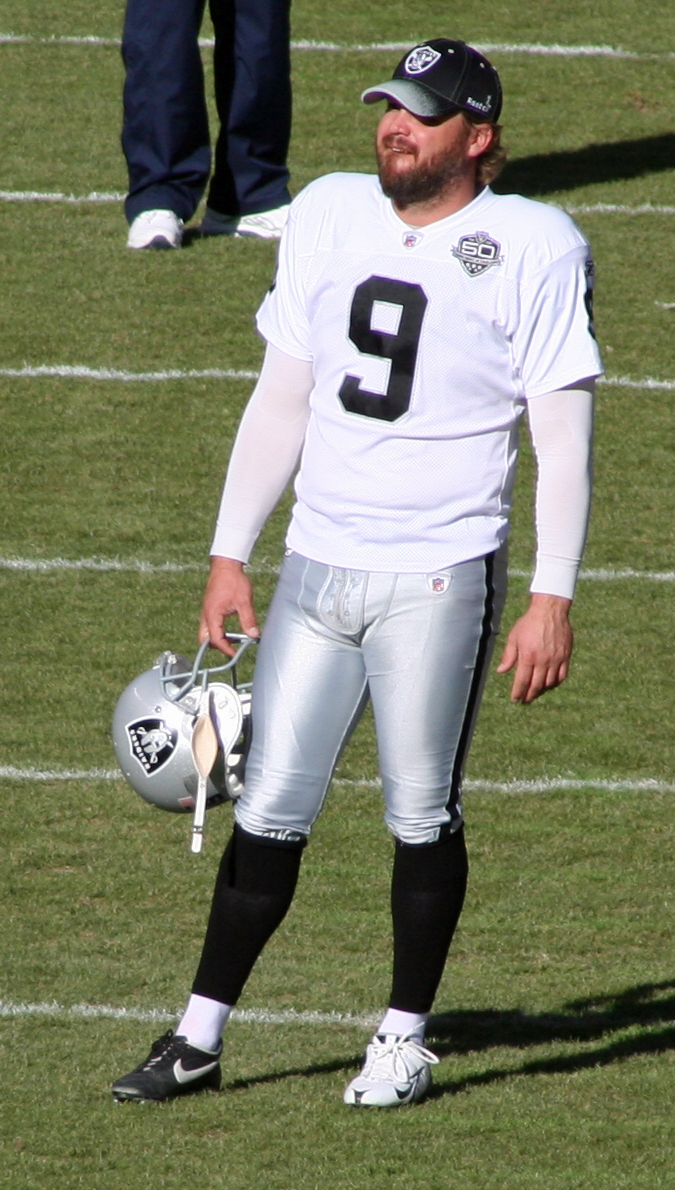
Lechler in 2009

On February 18, 2009, Lechler signed a four-year, $12 million contract, making him the highest-paid punter in NFL history.

During the season-opening 24–20 loss to the Chargers on Monday Night Football, Lechler had four punts for 195 yards for a 48.75 average. In the next game against the Chiefs, he recorded seven punts for 398 yards for a season-high 56.86 average during the 13–10 road victory. During a Week 10 16–10 loss to the Chiefs, Lechler had a season-high 11 punts for a season-high 531 yards for a 48.27 average.

Lechler finished the 2009 season with 96 punts for 4,909 yards for a 51.14 average as the Raiders finished with a 5–11 record for the second consecutive year. His 4,909 yards in the 2009 season marked the Raiders franchise record for most punting yards in a season.

==== 2010 ====
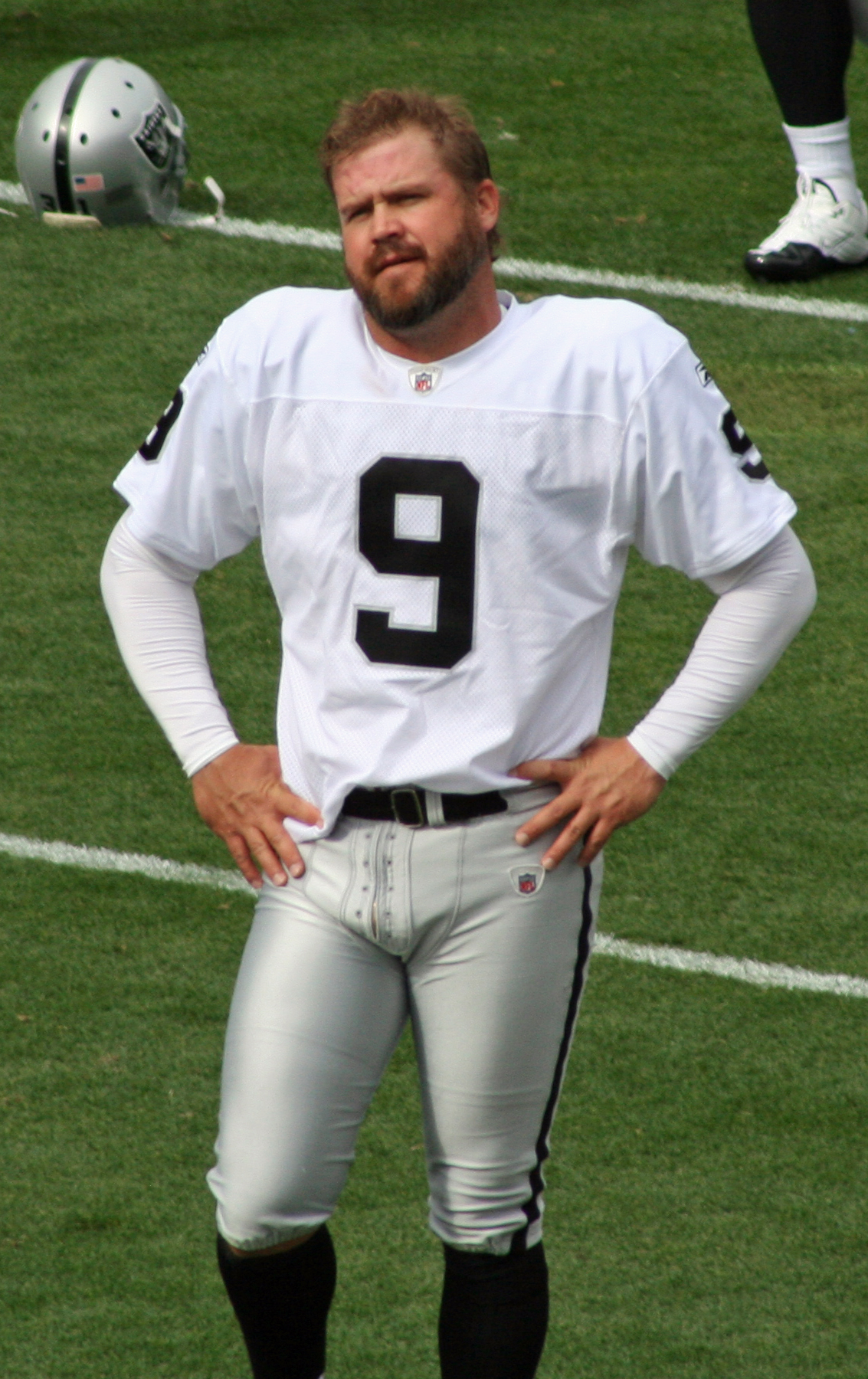
Lechler in 2010

During the season-opening 38–13 road loss to the Titans, Lechler recorded four punts for 219 yards for a season-high 54.75 average. During a Week 11 35–3 loss to the Steelers, he had a season-high eight punts for a season-high 390 yards for a 48.75 average.

Lechler finished the 2010 season with 77 punts for 3,618 yards for a 46.99 average as the Raiders finished with an 8–8 record.

==== 2011 ====
During the season-opening 23–20 road victory over the Broncos, Lechler had six punts for 349 yards for a season-high 58.17 average. During a Week 6 24–17 victory over the Cleveland Browns, as the holder for placekicker Sebastian Janikowski, Lechler threw a 35-yard touchdown pass to tight end Kevin Boss on a fake field goal attempt. During a Week 12 25–20 victory over the Bears, Lechler recorded a career-best 80-yard punt. That punt, kicked from his own 10-yard line (the Oakland 20-yard line was the line of scrimmage), bounced at the Chicago 11 and went into the end zone after traveling 79 yards in the air, setting a franchise record for the longest punt by a Raider. He finished the game with five punts for 273 yards. In the next game against the Dolphins, Lechler had a season-high eight punts for a season-high 372 yards for a 46.5 average during the 34–14 road loss.

Lechler finished the 2011 season with 78 punts for 3,960 yards for a 50.77 average as the Raiders finished with an 8–8 record for the second consecutive year.

==== 2012 ====
Lechler had a quiet season opener against the Chargers on Monday Night Football, punting twice for 114 yards for a season-high 57.00 average in the 22–14 loss. In the next game against the Dolphins, his usage increased with a season-high nine punts for a season-high 422 yards for a 46.89 average during the 35–13 loss.

Lechler finished the 2012 season with 81 punts for 3,826 yards for a 47.23 average as the Raiders finished with a 4–12 record.

=== Houston Texans ===
==== 2013 ====
On March 23, 2013, Lechler signed a three-year, $5.5 million deal with a $1 million signing bonus with the Houston Texans.

During the season-opening 31–28 comeback road victory over the Chargers on Monday Night Football, Lechler punted thrice for 135 yards for a 45.00 average in his Texans debut. During a Week 10 27–24 road loss to the Arizona Cardinals, he became just the sixth player in NFL history to reach the 50,000 punt-yard mark during his second punt of the game. In the next game against his former team, the Oakland Raiders, Lechler had a season-high nine punts for 442 yards for a 49.11 average during the 28–23 loss.

Lechler finished the 2013 season with 88 punts for 4,189 yards for a 47.60 average as the Texans struggled to a 2–14 record.

==== 2014 ====
During the season-opening 17–6 victory over the Washington Redskins, Lechler recorded six punts for 306 yards for a 51.00 average. During a Week 6 33–28 loss to the Colts on Thursday Night Football, he had four punts for 218 yards for a season-high 54.5 average. During a Week 15 17–10 road loss to the Colts, third-string quarterback Tom Savage was injured with under two minutes left and Houston down by seven, needing a touchdown to tie the game. All of their other quarterbacks were injured, and Lechler, a former high school quarterback, began to warm up. Houston called a timeout after the injury and Savage stayed in the game, throwing an interception on the very next play. Lechler never entered the game as a quarterback. In the next game against the Baltimore Ravens, he had a season-high eight punts for a season-high 361 yards for a 45.13 average during the 25–13 victory.

Lechler finished the 2014 season with 83 punts for 3,845 yards for a 46.33 average as the Texans finished with a 9–7 record and missed out on the playoffs.

==== 2015 ====
During the season-opening 27–20 loss to the Chiefs, Lechler had seven punts for 329 yards for a 47.00 average. During a Week 11 24–17 victory over the Jets, he recorded eight punts for a season-high 417 yards for a 52.13 average.

Lechler finished the 2015 season with 95 punts for 4,497 yards for a 47.34 average. The Texans finished the 2015 season atop the AFC South with a 9–7 record and qualified for the playoffs. In his first playoff game since the 2002 season, Lechler had five punts for 228 yards (45.60 average) during the 30–0 shoutout loss to the Chiefs in the Wild Card Round.

==== 2016 ====
On March 11, 2016, Lechler signed a one-year, $1.3 million contract with the Texans.

During the season opening 23–14 victory over the Bears, Lechler recorded five punts for 243 yards for a 48.6 average. During a Week 8 20–13 victory over the Detroit Lions, he had four punts for 203 yards for a 50.75 average to earn AFC Special Teams Player of the Week honors. During a narrow Week 16 12–10 victory over the Cincinnati Bengals, Lechler recorded a season-high eight punts for a season-high 371 yards for a 46.38 average. Overall, on the 2016 season, he had 72 punts for 3,423 yards for a 47.54 average.

The Texans finished the 2016 season atop the AFC South with a 9–7 record and qualified for the playoffs. In the Wild Card Round against the Raiders, Lechler had nine punts for 414 yards (46.00 average) during the 27–14 victory. During the Divisional Round against the Patriots, he recorded eight punts for 341 yards (42.63 average) in the 34–16 road loss.

==== 2017 ====
On March 8, 2017, Lechler signed a one-year contract extension with the Texans.

During the season-opening 29–7 loss to the Jacksonville Jaguars, Lechler had five punts for 216 net yards for a 43.2 average. During a Week 15 45–7 road loss to the Jaguars, he recorded a season-high 11 punts for a season-high 518 yards for a 47.09 average.

Lechler finished the 2017 season with 92 punts for a league-leading 4,507 yards for a 48.99 average as the Texans finished with a 4–12 record.

==== 2018 ====
On March 8, 2018, Lechler signed a one-year contract for $2 million to remain with the Texans.

On August 31, Lechler was released by the Texans after rookie Trevor Daniel won the starting job. Afterwards, Lechler stated that he did not plan on retiring.

=== Retirement ===
After sitting out of the league for the entire 2018 season, Lechler officially announced his retirement on March 30, 2019. He was named to the NFL's All-Decade Team of the 2010s and the NFL 100 All-Time Team.

== Records ==
Lechler booted at least one punt of 50 yards or more in 33 consecutive games from Week 13 of 2003 through Week 14 of 2005, the longest streak by any player since the AFL/NFL merger in 1970. He was a seven-time Pro Bowler, in 2001, 2004 and 2007–2011, and was voted All-Pro nine times (2000, 2001, 2003, 2004, 2007–2011), with six of those being a 1st team selection. No other punter has been named a First-team All-pro more than Lechler. He held the NFL record in career average yards per punt for two decades starting in 2003, including his 47.6-yard average at retirement, and was not beaten until 2023 by Michael Dickson and AJ Cole. Lechler has the five best single-season punting averages in Raiders history, including a career-best 51.1 in 2009, the third-highest single-season average in league history (to Sammy Baugh's 51.4 in 1940 and Ryan Stonehouse's 53.1 in 2022).

== Career statistics ==
Legend
	Led the league
**Bold**	Career high

=== NFL ===
==== Regular season ====
Year	Team	GP	Punting							
Year	Team	GP	Punts	Yds	Lng	Avg	Net Avg	Blk	Ins20	RetY
2000	OAK	16	65	2,984	69	45.9	38.0	**1**	24	279
2001	OAK	16	73	3,375	65	46.2	35.6	**1**	23	502
2002	OAK	14	53	2,251	70	42.5	32.7	0	18	276
2003	OAK	16	**96**	4,503	73	46.9	37.2	0	27	**669**
2004	OAK	16	73	3,409	67	46.7	37.2	0	22	413
2005	OAK	16	82	3,744	64	45.7	37.9	0	26	460
2006	OAK	16	77	3,660	67	47.5	36.4	**1**	19	437
2007	OAK	16	73	3,585	70	49.1	41.1	0	25	445
2008	OAK	16	90	4,391	70	48.8	41.2	0	33	425
2009	OAK	16	**96**	**4,909**	70	**51.1**	**43.9**	0	30	459
2010	OAK	16	77	3,618	68	47.0	40.8	0	27	400
2011	OAK	16	78	3,960	**80**	50.8	40.9	0	27	593
2012	OAK	16	81	3,826	68	47.2	39.0	**1**	21	450
2013	HOU	16	88	4,189	65	47.6	40.0	0	**34**	530
2014	HOU	16	83	3,845	71	46.3	38.7	**1**	27	398
2015	HOU	16	95	4,497	64	47.3	38.8	0	24	612
2016	HOU	16	72	3,423	62	47.5	40.1	0	30	477
2017	HOU	16	92	4,507	68	49.0	41.3	0	32	608
Career		286	1,444	68,676	80	47.6	39.1	5	469	8,433

==== Postseason ====
Year	Team	GP	Punting				
Year	Team	GP	Punts	Yds	Avg	Lng	Blk
2000	OAK	2	12	549	**45.8**	69	0
2001	OAK	2	11	441	40.1	65	0
2002	OAK	3	11	423	38.5	**70**	0
2015	HOU	1	5	228	45.6	64	0
2016	HOU	2	**17**	**755**	44.4	62	0
Career		10	56	2,396	42.8	70	0

=== College ===
Year	School	Punting			
Year	School	G	Punts	Yds	Avg
1996	Texas A&M	12	72	3,074	42.7
1997	Texas A&M	12	56	2,631	**47.0**
1998	Texas A&M	13	**80**	**3,485**	43.6
1999	Texas A&M	11	60	2,787	46.5
Career		48	268	11,977	44.7

== Personal life ==
Lechler was previously married to Erin Gibson, who was an All-American volleyball player at Texas A&M. He comes from an athletic family: both of his parents participated in Baylor athletics, and his brother Derek was a punter for Texas A&M. Lechler has said that he is good friends with former teammate and All-Pro defensive end J. J. Watt.

== See also ==
- List of most consecutive games played by National Football League players
- List of National Football League annual punting yards leaders
- List of National Football League career punting yards leaders
