= Rick Miller (Texas politician) =

American politician

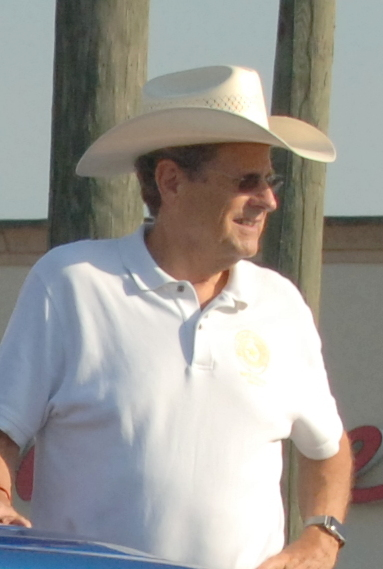

Member of the Texas House of Representatives from the 26th district
- In office January 8, 2013 – January 11, 2021
- Preceded by: Charles F. Howard
- Succeeded by: Jacey Jetton

Personal details
- Party: Republican
- Spouse: Treanne Miller
- Children: 3

Rick Miller is an American politician. He served as a Republican member for the 26th district of the Texas House of Representatives.

Miller attended the United States Naval Academy and the Industrial College of the Armed Forces, where he earned his Master of Science degree. Miller was a pitcher for the United States Olympic baseball team in Mexico. He was a United States Naval Aviator in carrier-based squadrons, and had staff assignments at the Pentagon. He was a senior member of the Strategic Studies Group of the Chief of Naval Operations, tasked with developing naval strategies for the 21st century. Awards he received during his naval service included the Meritorious Service Medal, Legion of Merit, Defense Superior Service Medal and the Navy Commendation Medal.

Following his service in the Navy Miller was a senior consultant, vice-president and senior vice-president for various companies. He was chair of TEC International, and is president of Trevaniongroup LLC, a company he founded.

In 2013, Miller was elected for the 26th district of the Texas House of Representatives, succeeding Charles F. Howard. He did not seek re-election in 2020, and left office in 2021. Miller and his wife lived in Sugar Land, Texas.
