= Texas's 26th House of Representatives district =

Texas electoral district

Texas's 26th State House of Representatives district
Representative
Matt Morgan; R–Richmond
- Demographics: 42.1% White; 12.3% Black; 23.5% Hispanic; 21.1% Asian
- Population (2020): 199,811

District 26 is a district in the Texas House of Representatives. It was created in the 3rd Legislature (1849–1851).

The district is wholly within Fort Bend County and accounts for nearly a quarter (24%) of the counties representation in the chamber. It includes the cities of Cumings, Richmond, and Pecan Grove. The district also includes portions of Katy, with the rest of the population dispersed though unincorporated areas of the county.

The district is represented by Matt Morgan.

== Elections ==
General Election 2024: District 26
Party	Candidate	Votes	%	±%
Republican	Matt Morgan	48,561	59.17%	
Democratic	Daniel Lee	33,505	40.83%	

General Election 2022: District 26
Party	Candidate	Votes	%	±%
Republican	Jacey Jetton	37,376	60.67	+8.88
Democratic	Daniel Lee	24,230	39.33	−8.88

General Election 2020: District 26
Party	Candidate	Votes	%	±%
Republican	Jacey Jetton	43,438	51.79	−0.62
Democratic	L. "Sarah" Demarchant	40,436	48.21	+0.62

General Election 2018: District 26
Party	Candidate	Votes	%	±%
Republican	D.F. "Rick" Miller	34,504	52.41	−5.45
Democratic	L. "Sarah" Demarchant	31,330	47.59	+5.45

General Election 2016: District 26
Party	Candidate	Votes	%	±%
Republican	D.F. "Rick" Miller	39,693	57.86	+0
Democratic	L. "Sarah" DeMerchant	28,910	42.14	+0
