= Wharton County Leader-Journal =

- Wharton Journal-Spectator front page
- Type: Semiweekly Newspaper
- Format: Broadsheet
- Owner: Times Media Group
- Editor: Shannon Crabtree
- Founded: 1889
- Language: English
- Headquarters: 203 East Jackson Street, El Campo, Texas United States
- Circulation: 2,108 (as of 2023)
- Website: wcleaderjournal.com

Wharton County Leader-Journal is a semi-daily newspaper published on Wednesday and Saturday based in El Campo, Texas. It is owned by Times Media Group. The newspaper offers subscriptions to a digital edition in PDF format.

== History ==
The history of the newspaper dates to A. Foote and his brother, Dr. Stephen A. Foote, early relatives of Wharton's Pulitzer Prize-winning playwright Horton Foote.

They began publishing the Wharton Spectator on Nov. 2, 1889, beginning one branch of the modern-day Journal-Spectator family tree. The Shannon family — brothers F.W., Hal and Emmett — bought it in 1910.

In March 1935, Harvey and Hildred Evans launched a rival, the Wharton Journal, which was bought in 1958 by Marlow Preston. The competition ended when the Shannons sold Preston the Spectator in 1967.

The Spectator published Sundays, the Journal Wednesdays. It first published twice a week under the same name, Wharton Journal-Spectator, on Sunday, May 12, 1974.

In 1977, Preston sold the Journal-Spectator to River Publishers, Inc., owned by Fred Barbee of El Campo and his partner A. Richard Elam. Barbee served as publisher of the newspaper until his death in October 2007, at which time son Chris was named publisher.

A brand-new newspaper for a brand-new city was the impetus for starting the East Bernard Express in August 2003. When the Wharton County community decided to call an incorporation election, the staff of the Wharton Journal-Spectator decided to launch a new newspaper under the guidance of Editor and General Manager Larry Jackson.

Approximately a year later, River Publishers bought the East Bernard Tribune and merged the newspapers into one weekly publication.

Bill Wallace was named editor and publisher of the Wharton Journal-Spectator when it was sold in May 2009, along with the East Bernard Express to Wharton County Newspapers, Inc.

Several family members and employees of Rosenberg-based Hartman Newspapers, L.P. publish a group of 11 small daily and semiweekly newspapers in Texas, including Rosenberg, Rockport, Port Lavaca, Katy and Alvin.

In March 2024, the Wharton Journal-Spectator and the El Campo Leader-News were merged to form the Wharton County Leader-Journal.
