= Lissie, Texas =

- Unincorporated community
- Location within the state of Texas Lissie, Texas (the United States)
- Coordinates: 29°33′15″N 96°13′30″W
- Country: United States
- State: Texas
- County: Wharton
- Elevation: 153 ft (47 m)
- Time zone: UTC-6 (Central (CST))
  - Summer (DST): UTC-5 (CDT)
- ZIP code: 77454
- Area code: 979

Lissie is an unincorporated community in Wharton County, Texas, United States. According to the Handbook of Texas, the community had an estimated population of 70 in 2000. It is located within the Greater Houston metropolitan area.

== History ==
Lissie has a post office with the ZIP code 77454.

== Geography ==
Lissie is located along U.S. Highway 90A, 10 mi (16 km) west of East Bernard and 6.5 mi (10.5 km) east of Eagle Lake on the Southern Pacific Railroad in northern Wharton County.

== Education ==
Since 1956, Lissie has been served by the East Bernard Independent School District; previously it was in the Lissie school district.

== Notable people ==
- James Garrett Freeman - murderer
- Jim Tallas - politician

== Gallery ==
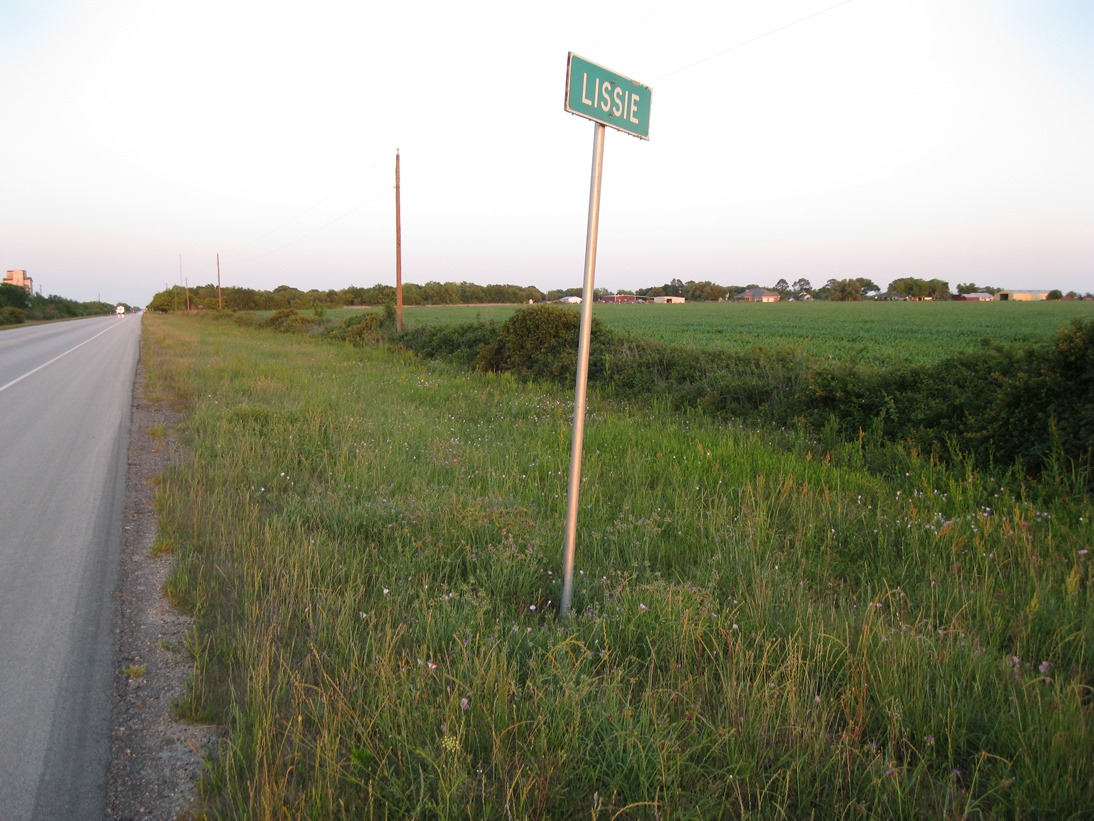
Lissie sign on US 90A looking southeast

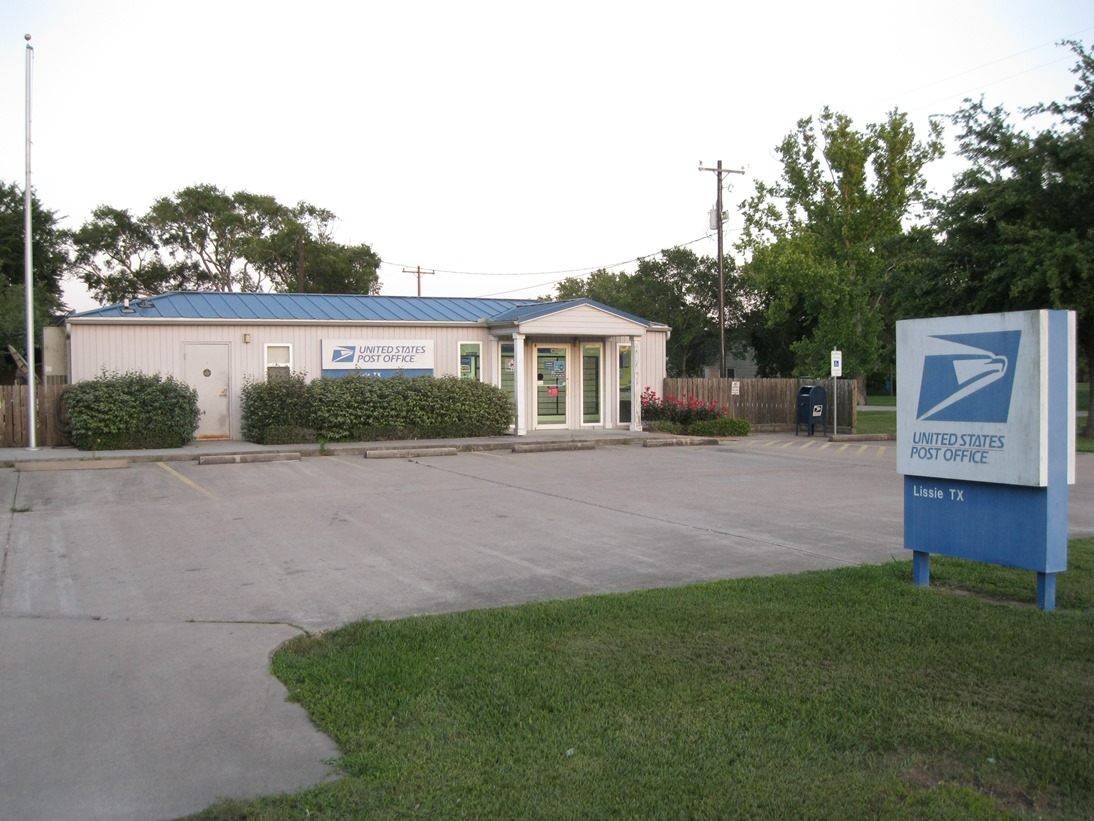
Post office

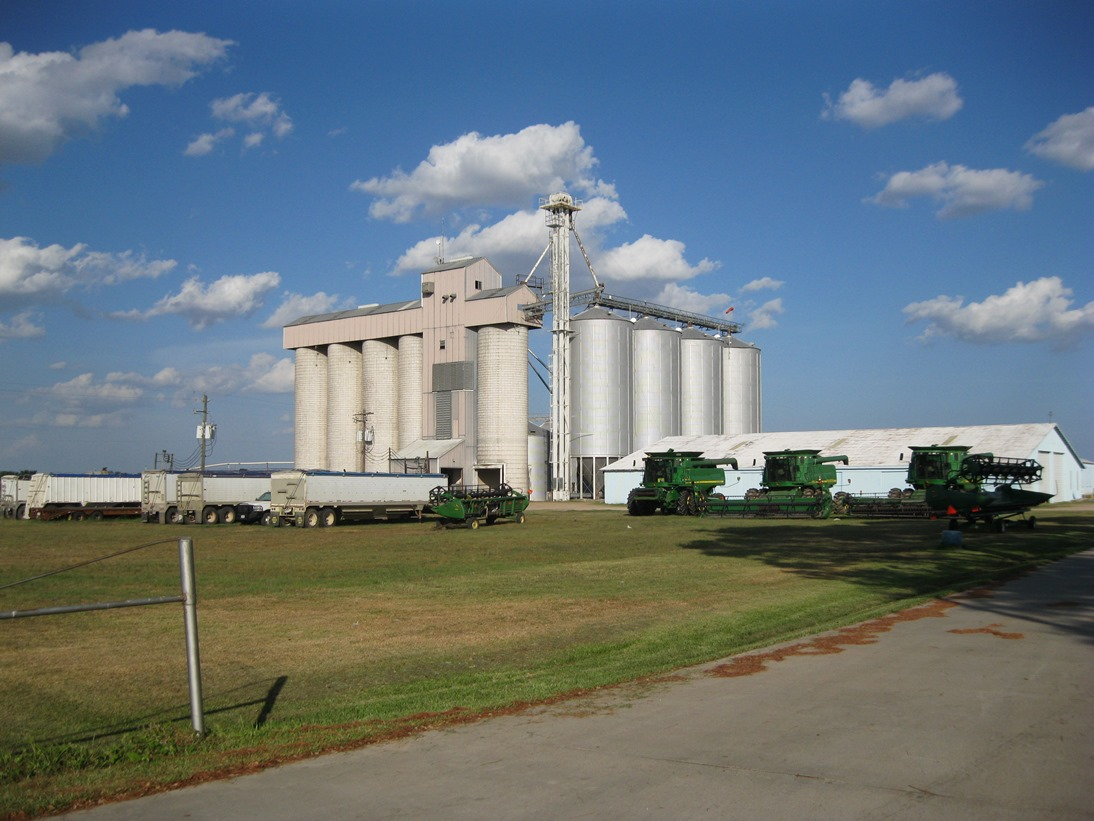
New grain elevator south of Lissie

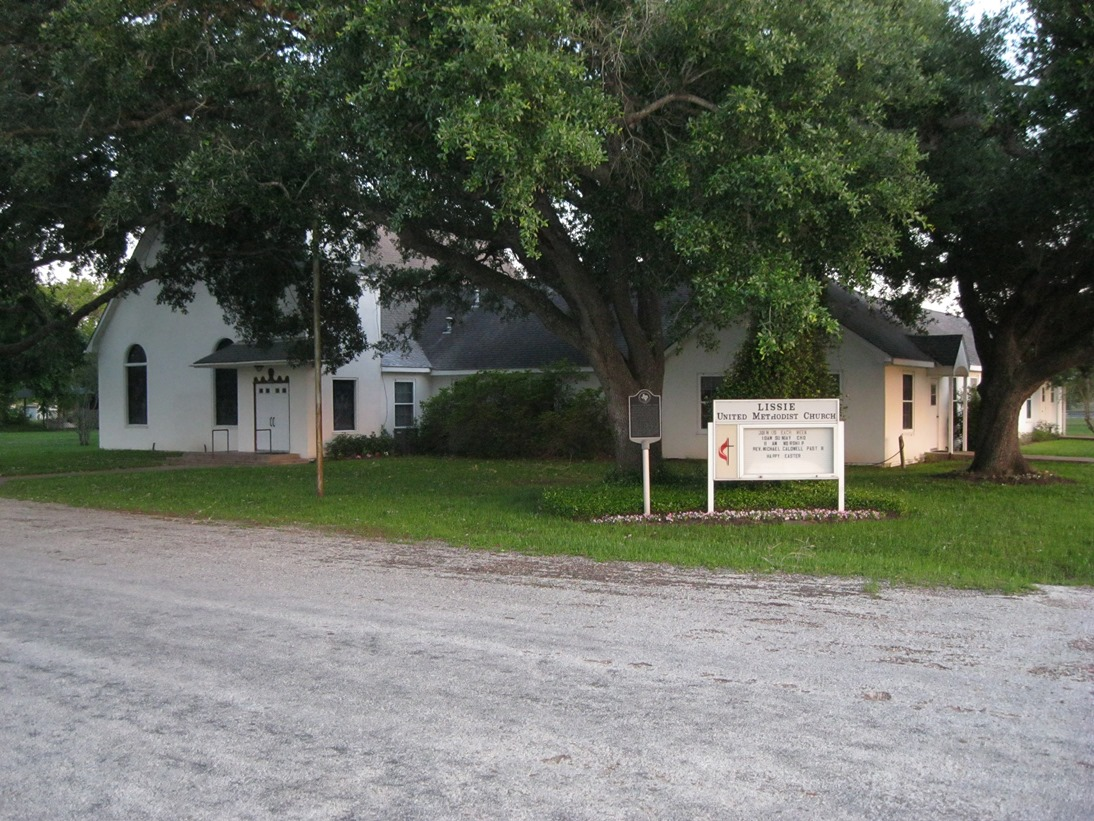
United Methodist Church

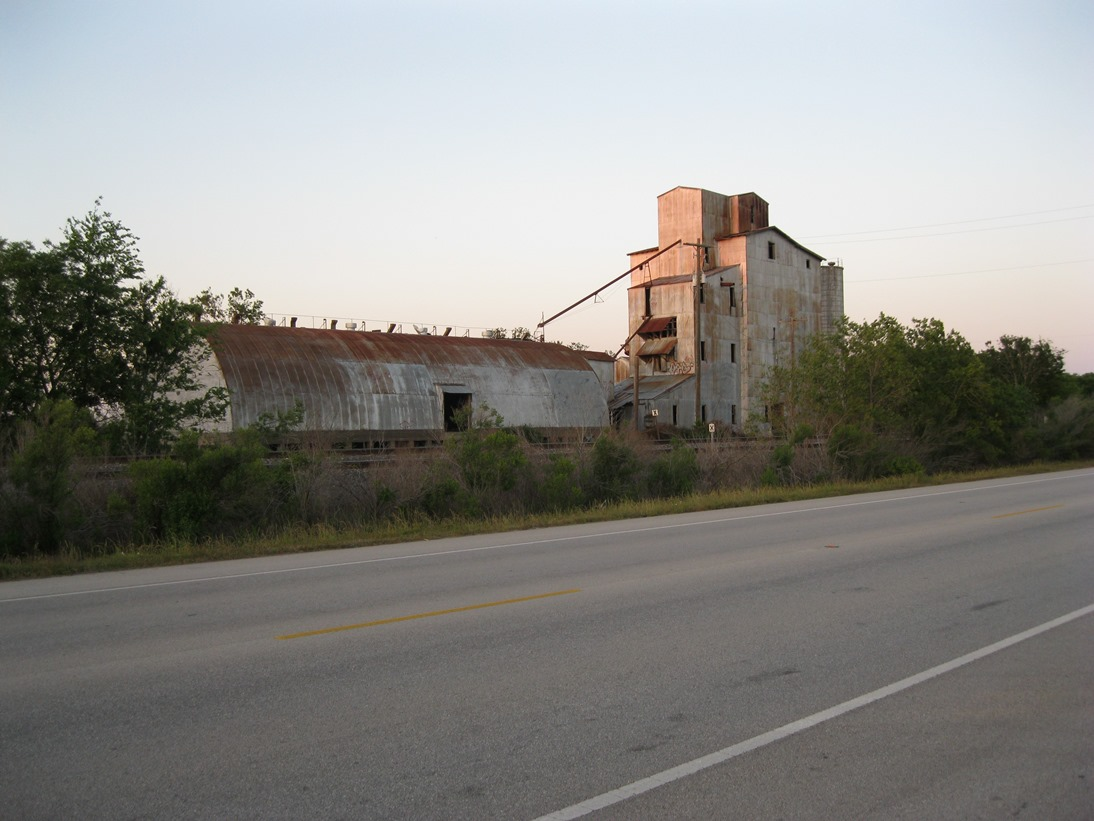
Disused grain storage facility along US 90A

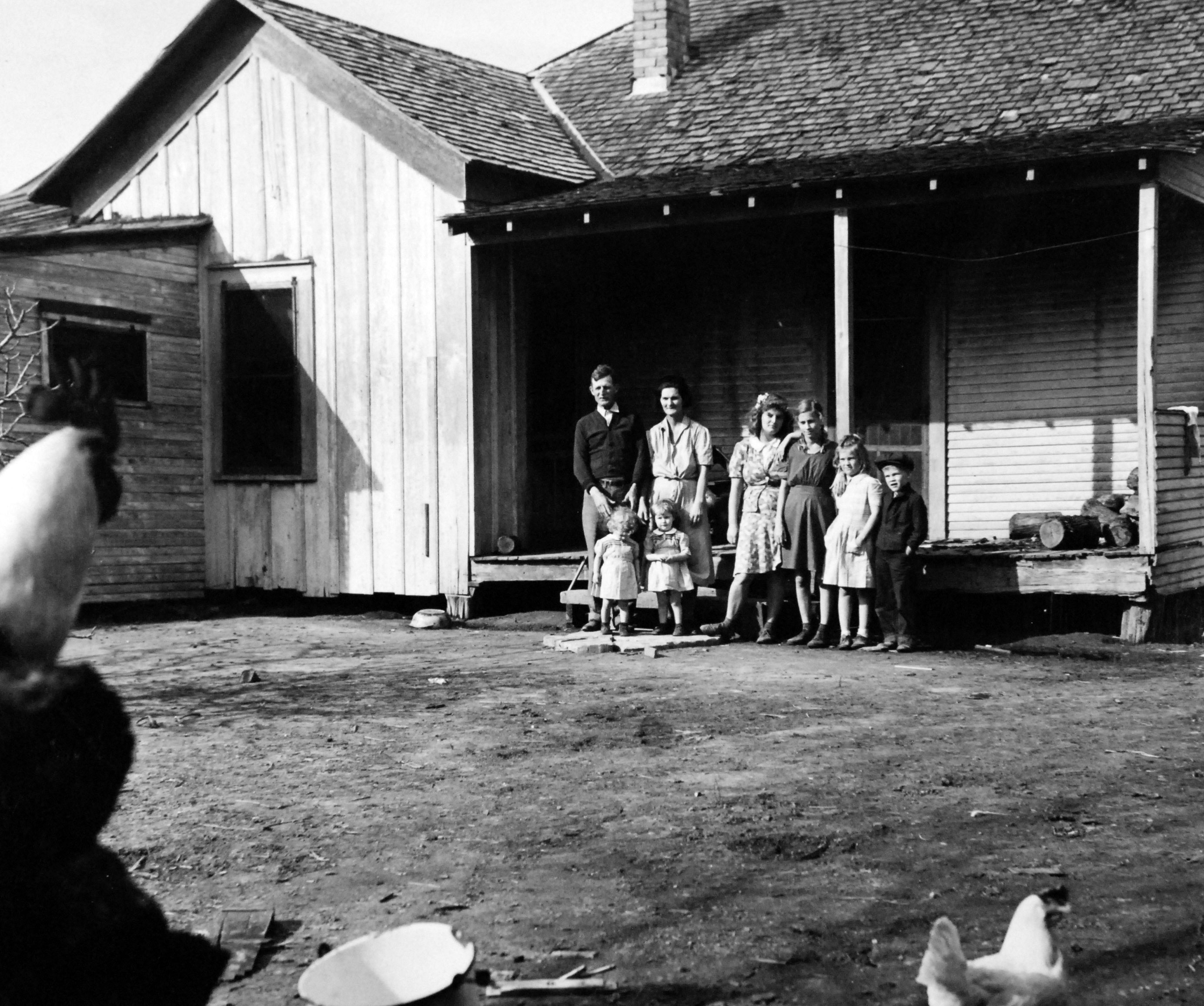
The family of Johnnie David Hutchins stands in front of the Hutchins cottage in Lissie after he was posthumously awarded the Medal of Honor (April 1944).
