= Jacey Jetton =

Texas legislator

Member of the Texas House of Representatives from the 26th district
- In office January 12, 2021 – January 14, 2025
- Preceded by: Rick Miller
- Succeeded by: Matt Morgan

Personal details
- Born: Jacey Ray Jetton; September 14, 1983 (age 43)
- Party: Republican
- Spouse: Fanny
- Children: 2
- Education: Florida Institute of Technology (BA)

Jacey Ray Jetton (born September 14, 1983) is an American politician and business owner who served as a member of the Texas House of Representatives from the 26th district. Jetton was first elected in November 2020 and assumed office in January 2021. He is a member of the Republican Party. Jetton previously served as the chairman of the Fort Bend County Republican Party. Jetton, who is Korean American through one parent, was the first Asian American county chair in Texas history.

In 2021, Jetton authored legislation that would prohibit drive-thru voting, which had been introduced in Harris County, Texas, during the COVID-19 pandemic.

In 2023, Jetton, a member of the Army National Guard, was called to active duty. Under the provisions of the Texas Constitution, any member of the Texas Legislature called into active duty can name his/her replacement to serve in the interim; Jetton named his wife Fanny to fill that role. In 2024, Jetton ran a rematch of the 2020 election against challenger, Matt Morgan, which he lost 54% to 39%.

On September 12th, 2025, Jetton announced he would no longer run for the position of Fort Bend County Judge in the 2026 election.

On December 1st, 2025, Jetton announced his candidacy for congress in Texas' 22nd district. Less than a week after the candidacy announcement, President Trump endorsed congressman Troy Nehls' brother, Trever Nehls, leading Jetton to drop out of the race.
