= East Bernard High School =

Public school in Texas, United States

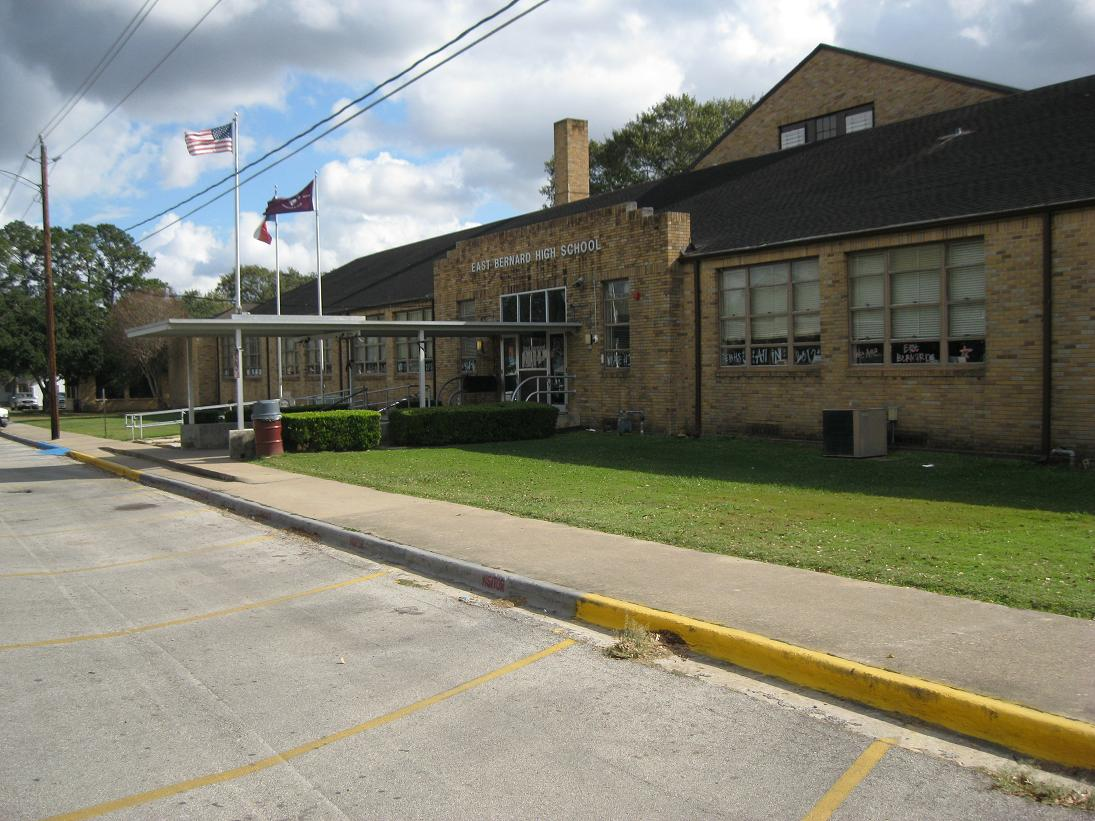

Location
- 723 College St. East Bernard, Texas 77435; United States

Information
- School type: Public High School
- School district: East Bernard Independent School District
- Principal: Doug Grigar
- Teaching staff: 30.35 (FTE)
- Grades: 9-12
- Enrollment: 301 (2023-2024)
- Student to teacher ratio: 9.92
- Colors: Maroon and white
- Athletics conference: UIL Class 3A
- Mascot: Brahma
- Nickname: Brahma/Brahmarette
- Newspaper: The Brahma Beat
- Website: East Bernard High School

East Bernard High School is a public high school located in East Bernard, Texas (USA) and classified as a 3A school by the UIL. It is part of the East Bernard Independent School District located in northeast Wharton County. In 2015, the school was rated "Met Standard" by the Texas Education Agency.

== Athletics ==
The East Bernard Brahmas compete in cross country, volleyball, football, basketball, powerlifting, golf, tennis, track, softball, baseball, and swimming.

=== State titles ===
- Baseball -
  - 1994(2A), 1995(2A)
- Boys cross country -
  - 2009(2A)
- Girls cross country -
  - 2015(3A), 2017(3A), 2025(3A)
- Football -
  - 1977(1A), 2012(2A/D2)
- Softball -
  - 2008(2A), 2015(3A)
- Volleyball -
  - 1973(1A), 1975(1A)+, 1975(1A)^, 1976(1A), 1980(3A), 1982(2A), 1983(2A), 1984(2A), 1988(2A), 1989(2A), 1990(2A), 1992(2A), 1993(2A)

+ Spring

^ Fall (volleyball changed to a fall sport in 1975)

==== State finalists ====
- Football -
  - 1982(2A)
- Volleyball -
  - 1972(1A), 1974(1A), 1986(2A)

== Notable alumni ==
- Shane Lechler - NFL punter for the Houston Texans. He is regarded as perhaps the greatest in the history of the NFL.
- Michael Bankston - Former defensive tackle / defensive end for NFL Phoenix Cardinals/Arizona Cardinals and Cincinnati Bengals.
